= List of plant genera named after people (K–P) =

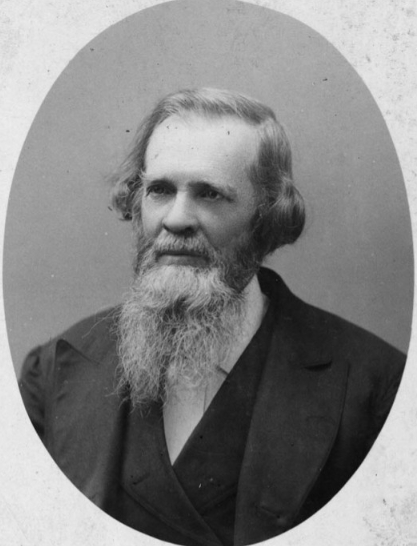
Albert Kellogg (see Kelloggia)

Since the first printing of Carl Linnaeus's Species Plantarum in 1753, plants have been assigned one epithet or name for their species and one name for their genus, a grouping of related species. Thousands of plants have been named after people, including botanists and their colleagues, plant collectors, horticulturists, explorers, rulers, politicians, clerics, doctors, philosophers and scientists. (Note: Other naturalists have also been honored, including agronomists, apothecaries, geographers, geologists, meteorologists, mycologists, pharmacologists and zoologists.) Even before Linnaeus, botanists such as Joseph Pitton de Tournefort, Charles Plumier and Pier Antonio Micheli were naming plants after people, sometimes in gratitude for the financial support of their patrons.

Early works researching the naming of plant genera include an 1810 glossary by Alexandre de Théis and an etymological dictionary in two editions (1853 and 1856) by Georg Christian Wittstein. Modern works include The Gardener's Botanical by Ross Bayton, Index of Eponymic Plant Names and Encyclopedia of Eponymic Plant Names by Lotte Burkhardt, Plants of the World by Maarten J. M. Christenhusz (lead author), Michael F. Fay and Mark W. Chase, The A to Z of Plant Names by Allan J. Coombes, the four-volume CRC World Dictionary of Plant Names by Umberto Quattrocchi, and Stearn's Dictionary of Plant Names for Gardeners by William T. Stearn; these supply the seed-bearing genera listed in the first column below. Excluded from this list are genus names not accepted (as of January 2021) at Plants of the World Online, which includes updates to Plants of the World (2017).

== Key ==
Ba = listed in Bayton's The Gardener's Botanical
Bt = listed in Burkhardt's Encyclopedia of Eponymic Plant Names
Bu = listed in Burkhardt's Index of Eponymic Plant Names
Ch = listed in Christenhusz's Plants of the World
Co = listed in Coombes's The A to Z of Plant Names
Qu = listed in Quattrocchi's CRC World Dictionary of Plant Names
St = listed in Stearn's Dictionary of Plant Names for Gardeners

In addition, Burkhardt's Index is used as a reference for every row in the table, except as noted.

== Genera ==
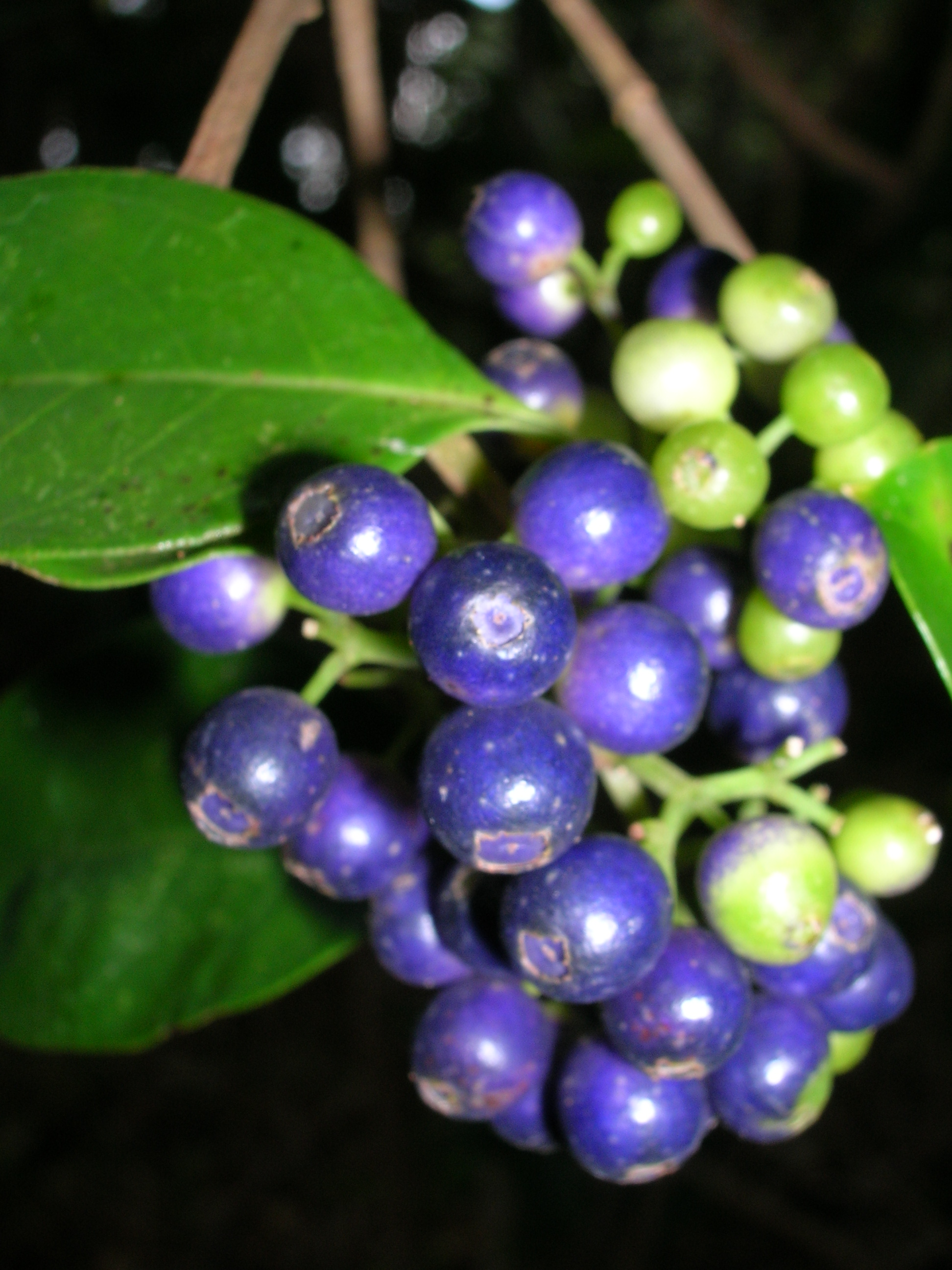
Kadua

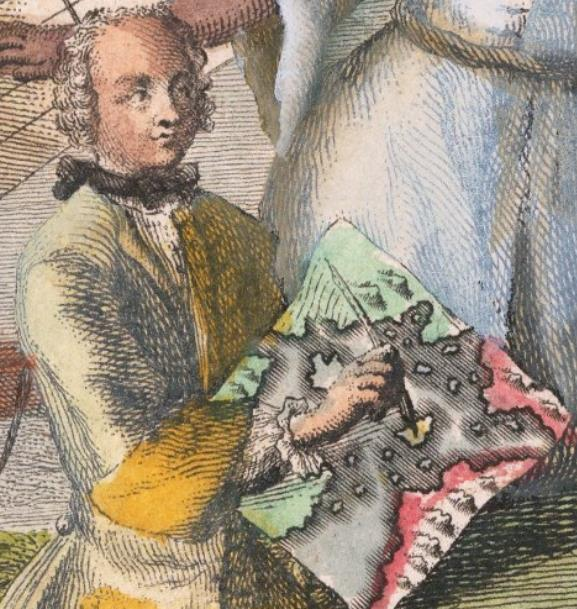
Cartouche of Engelbert Kaempfer

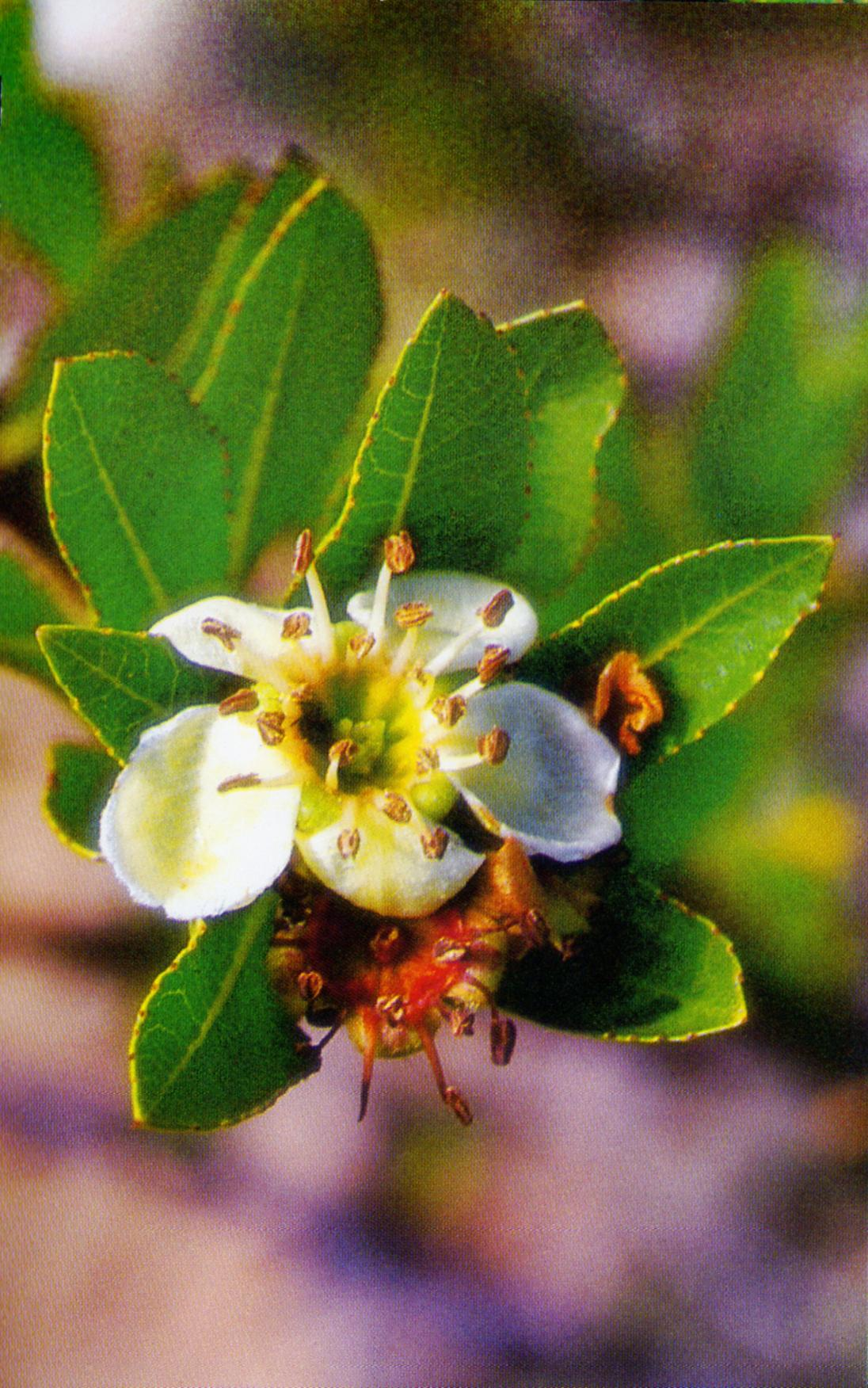
Kageneckia

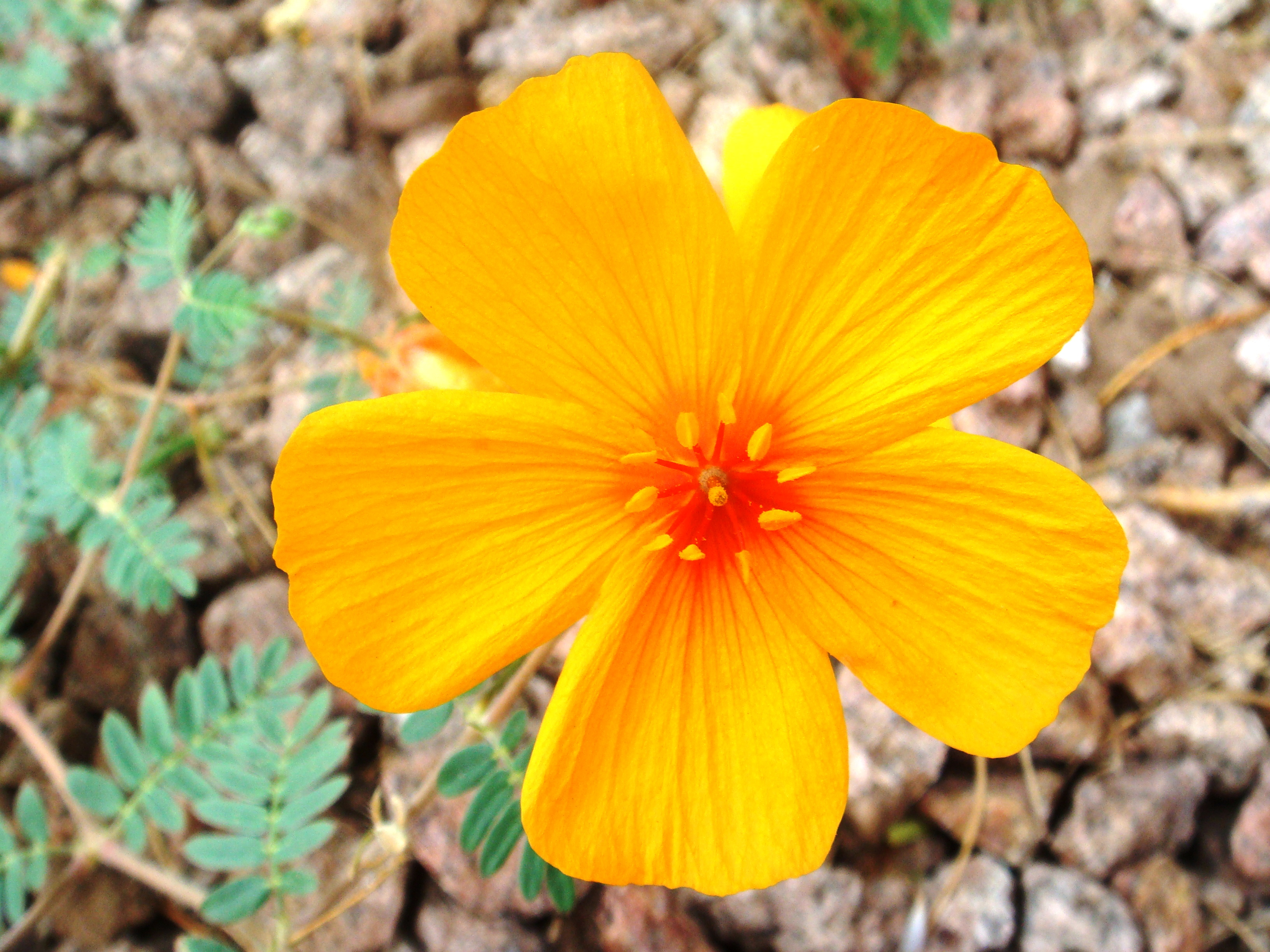
Kallstroemia

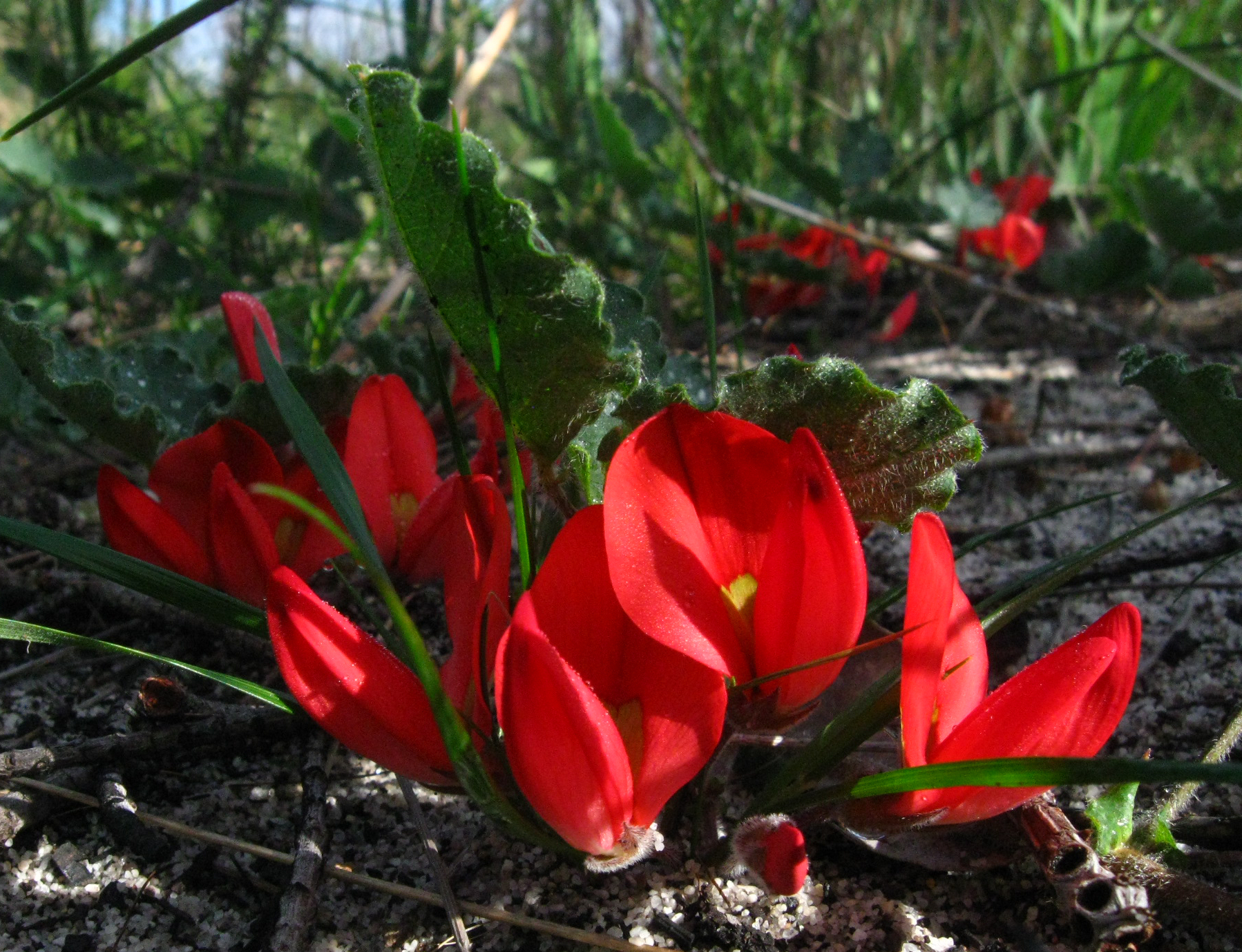
Kennedia

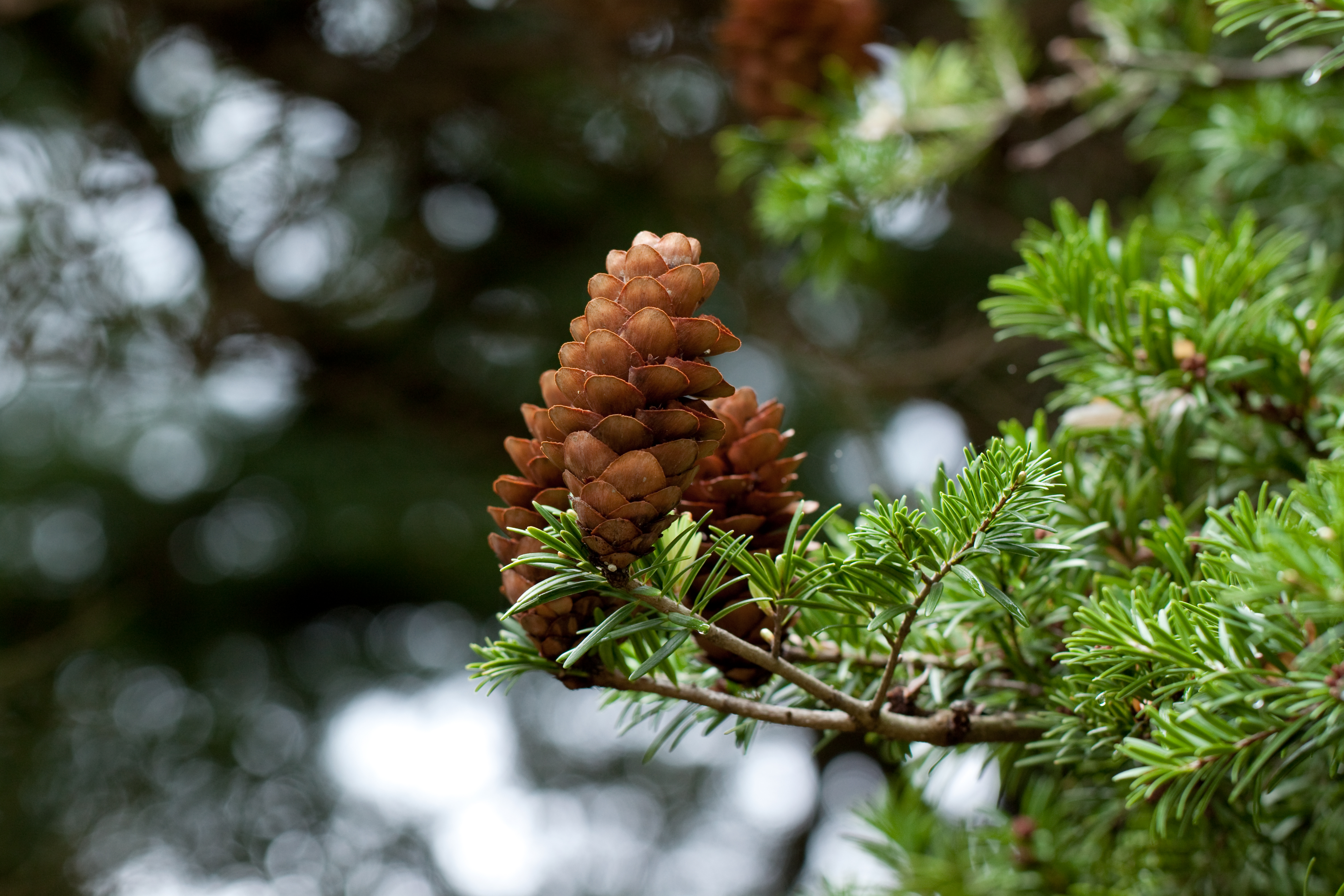
Keteleeria

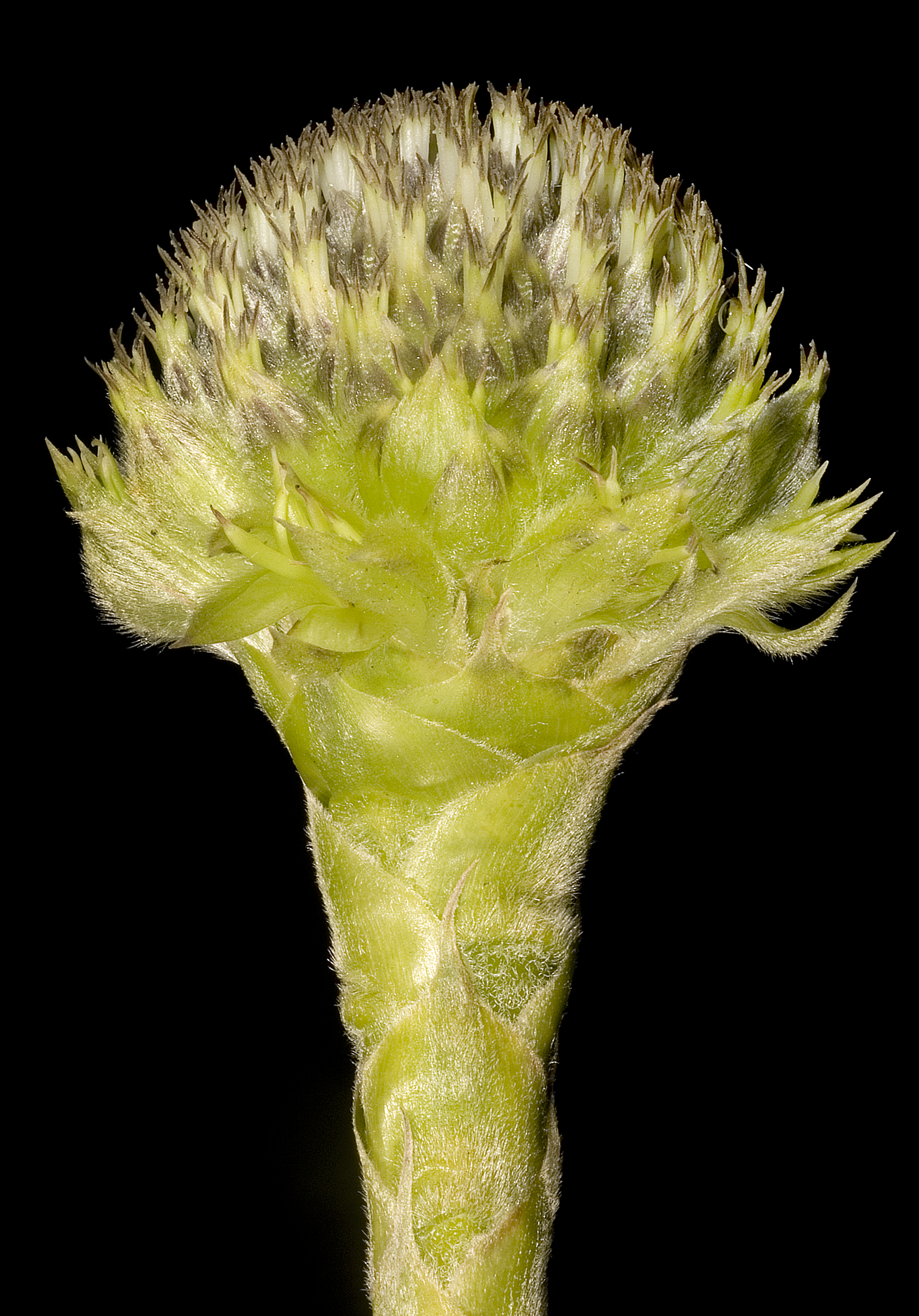
Kingia

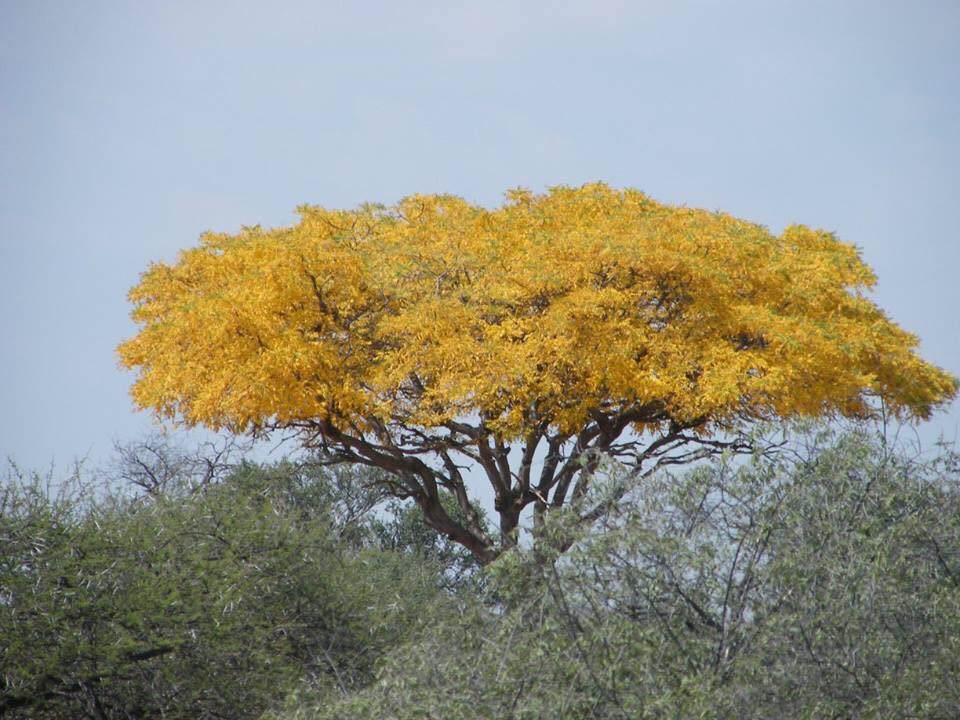
Kirkia

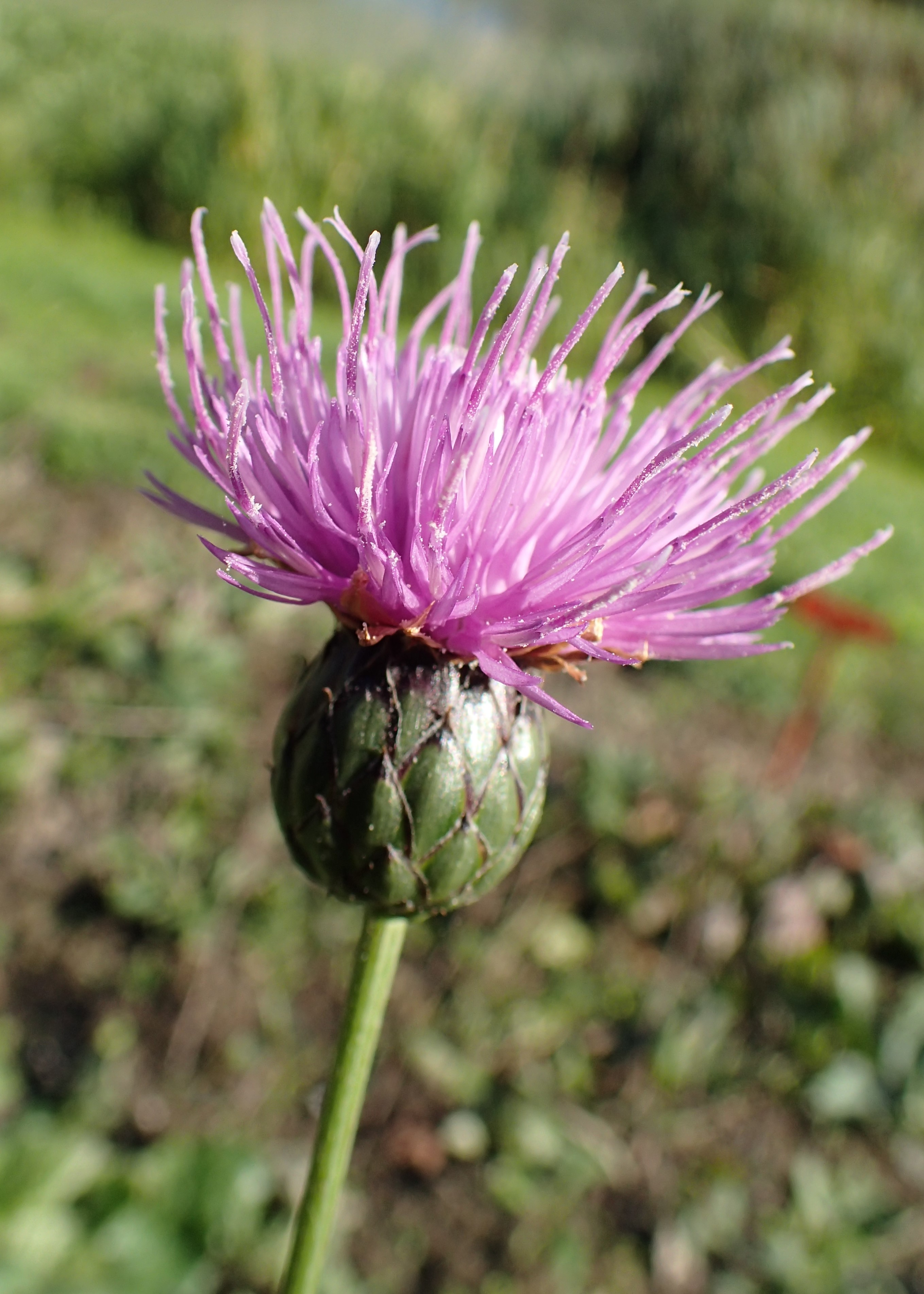
Klasea

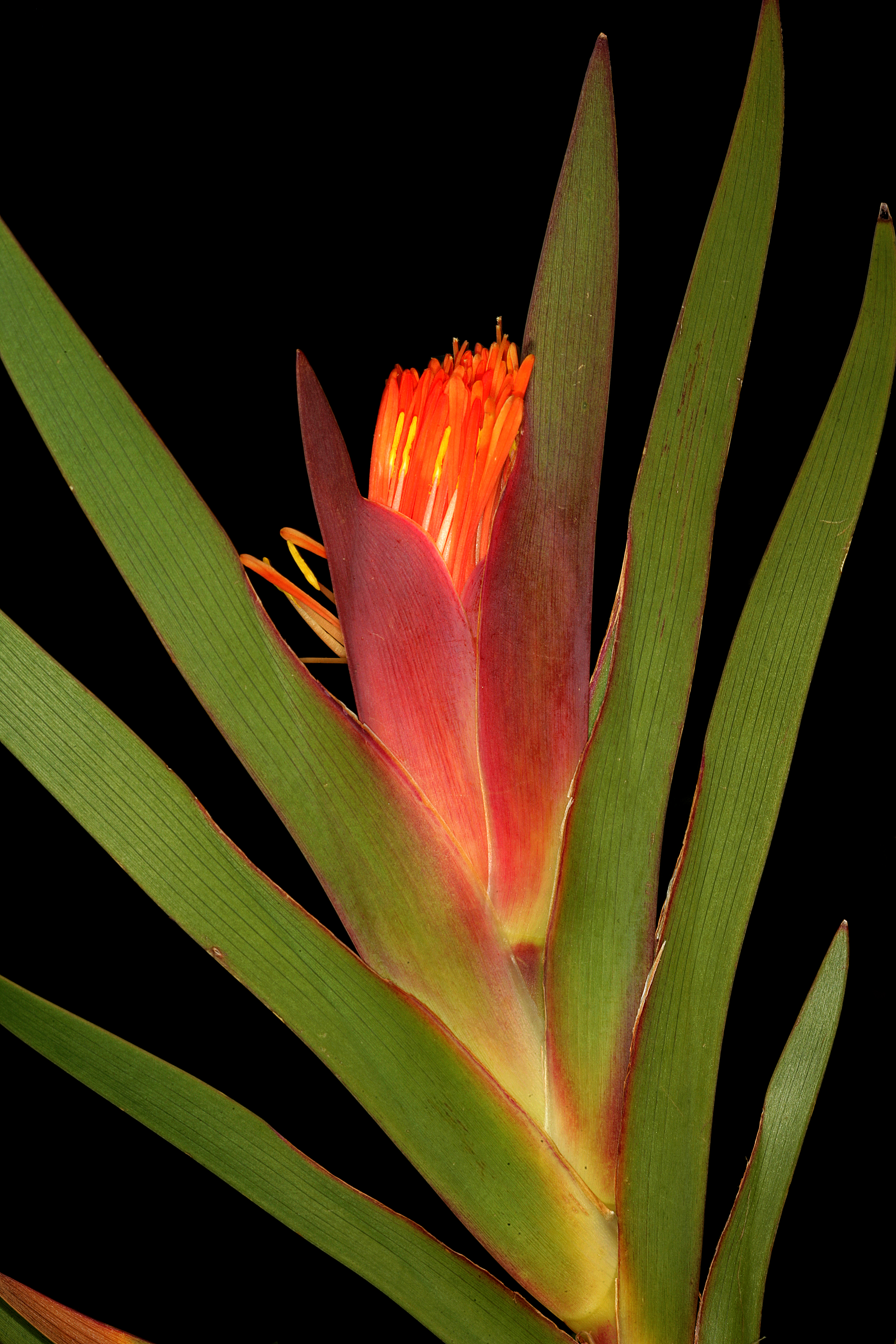
Klattia

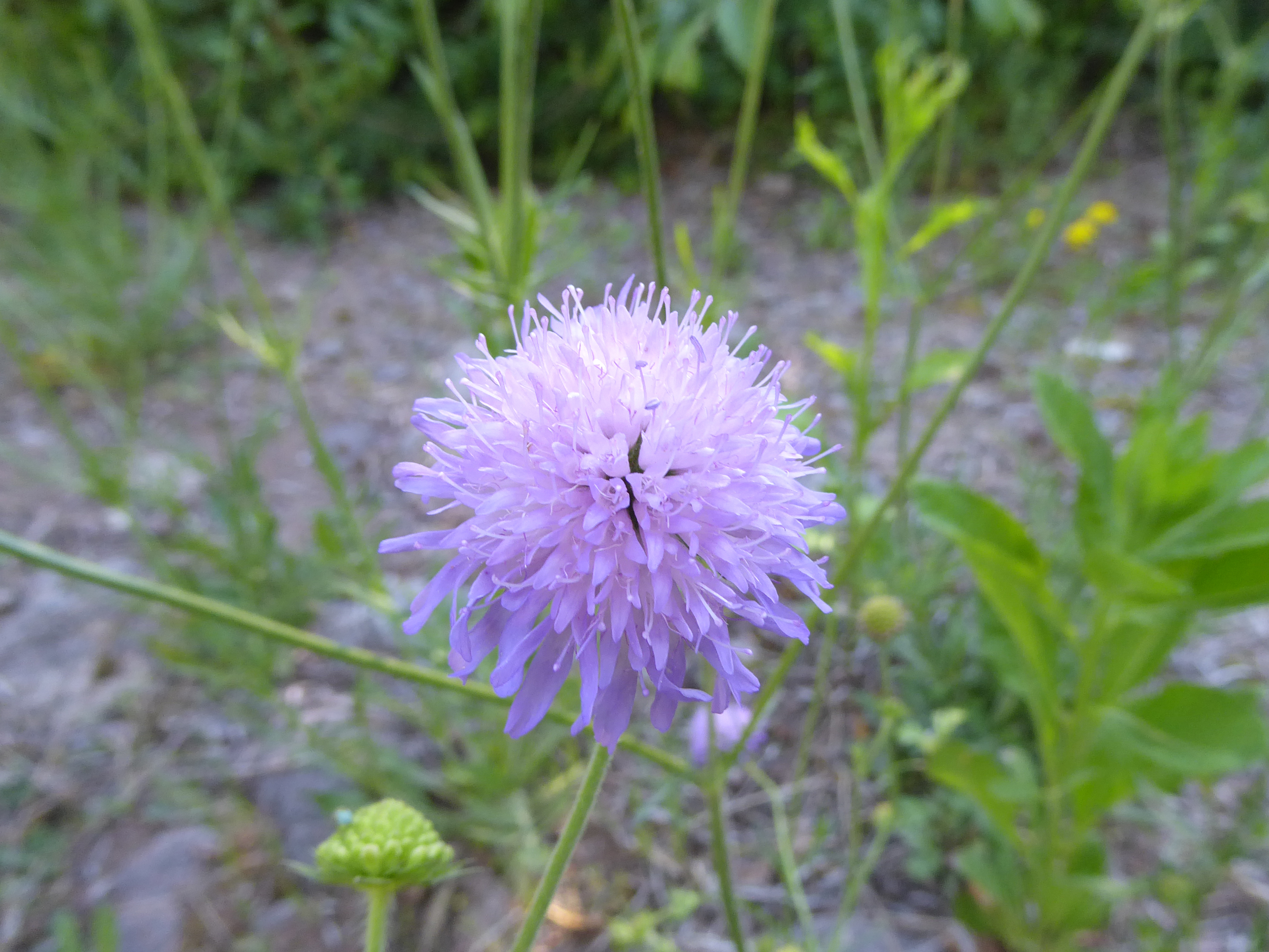
Knautia

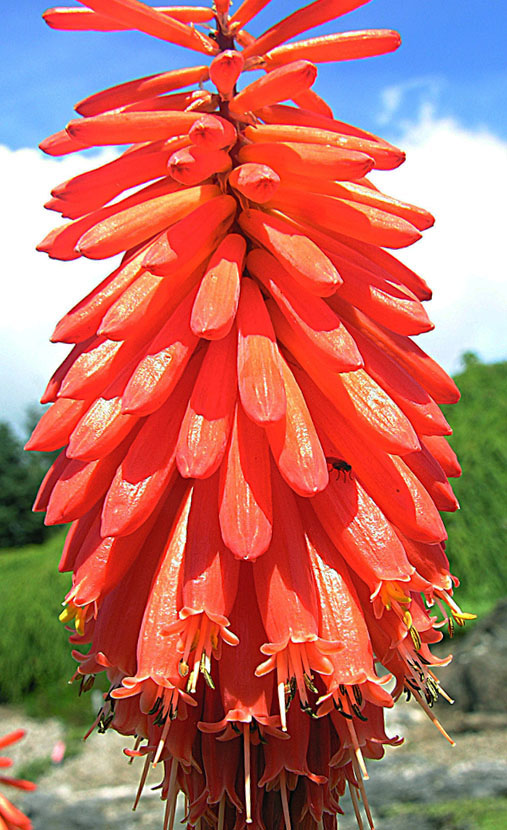
Kniphofia

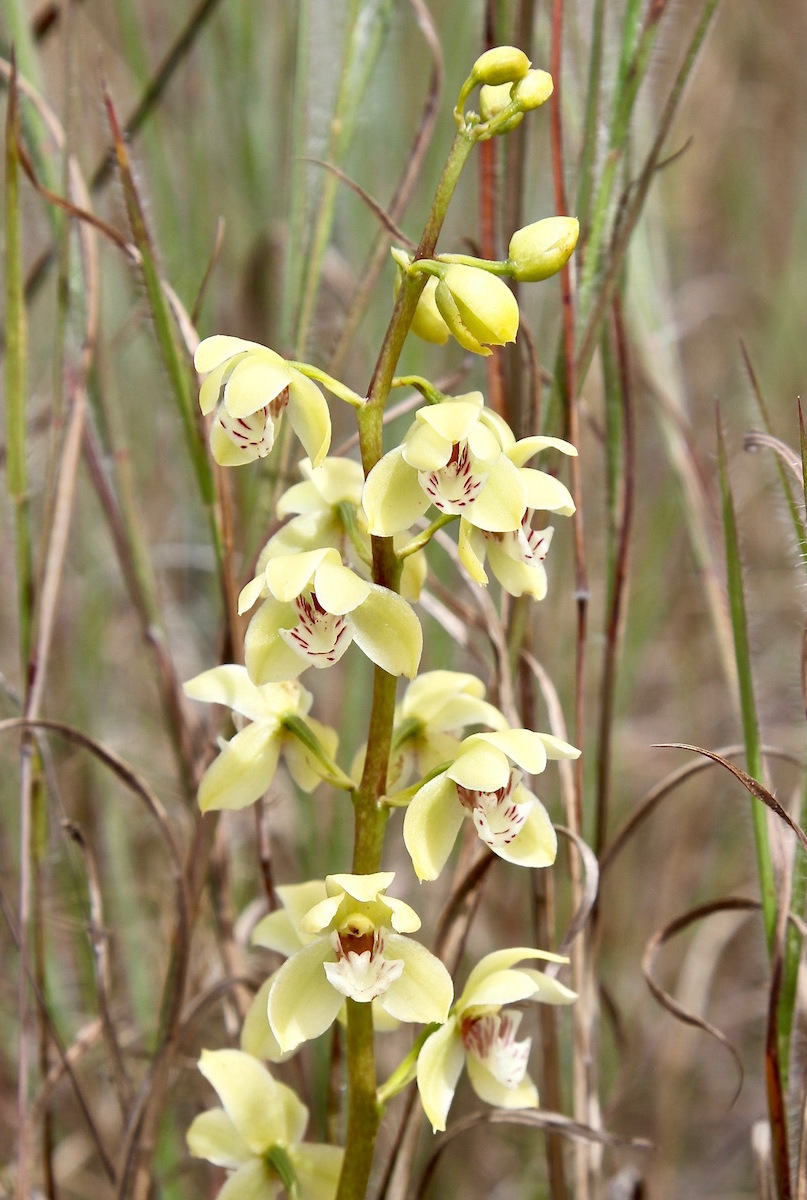
Koellensteinia

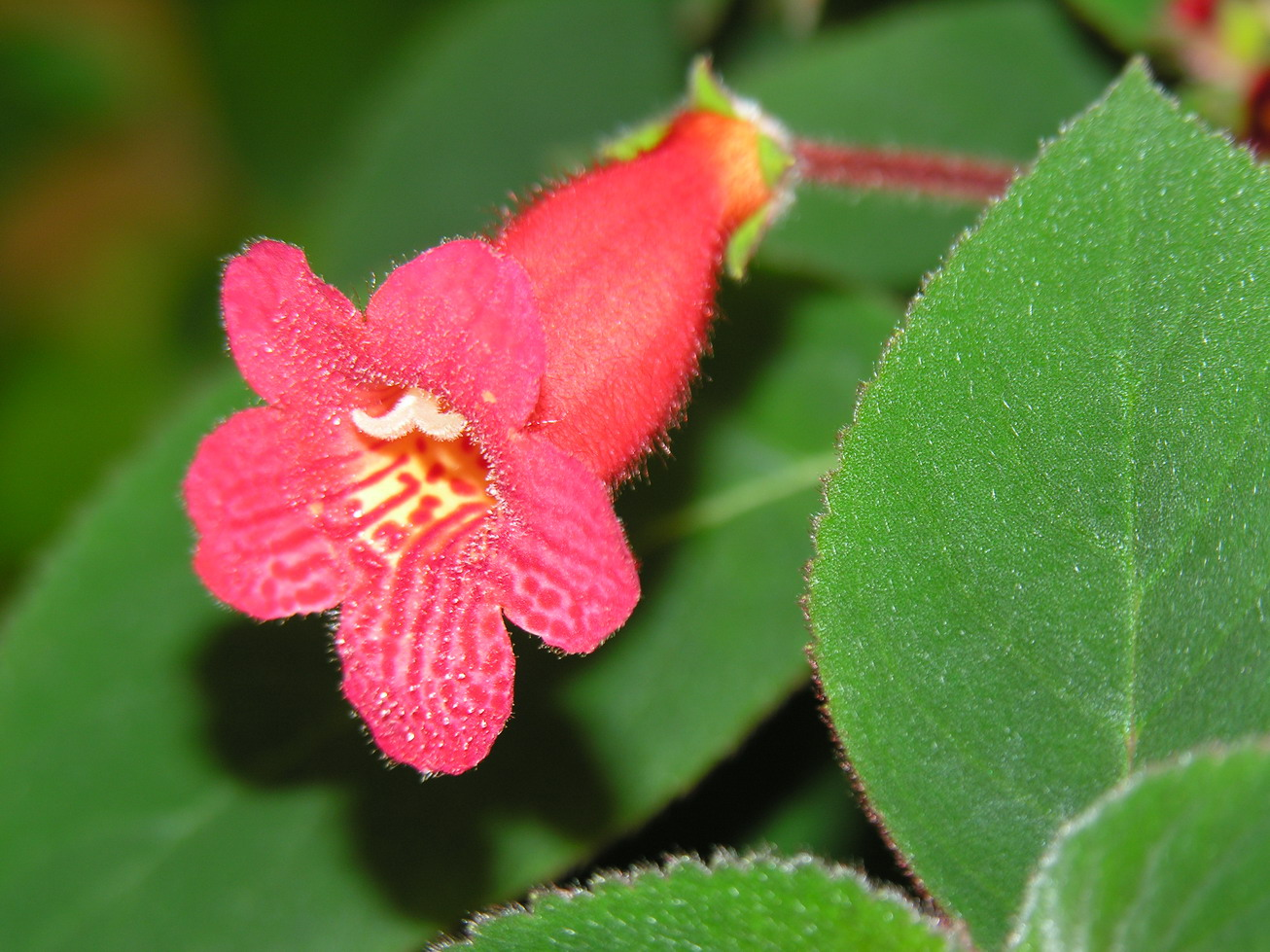
Kohleria

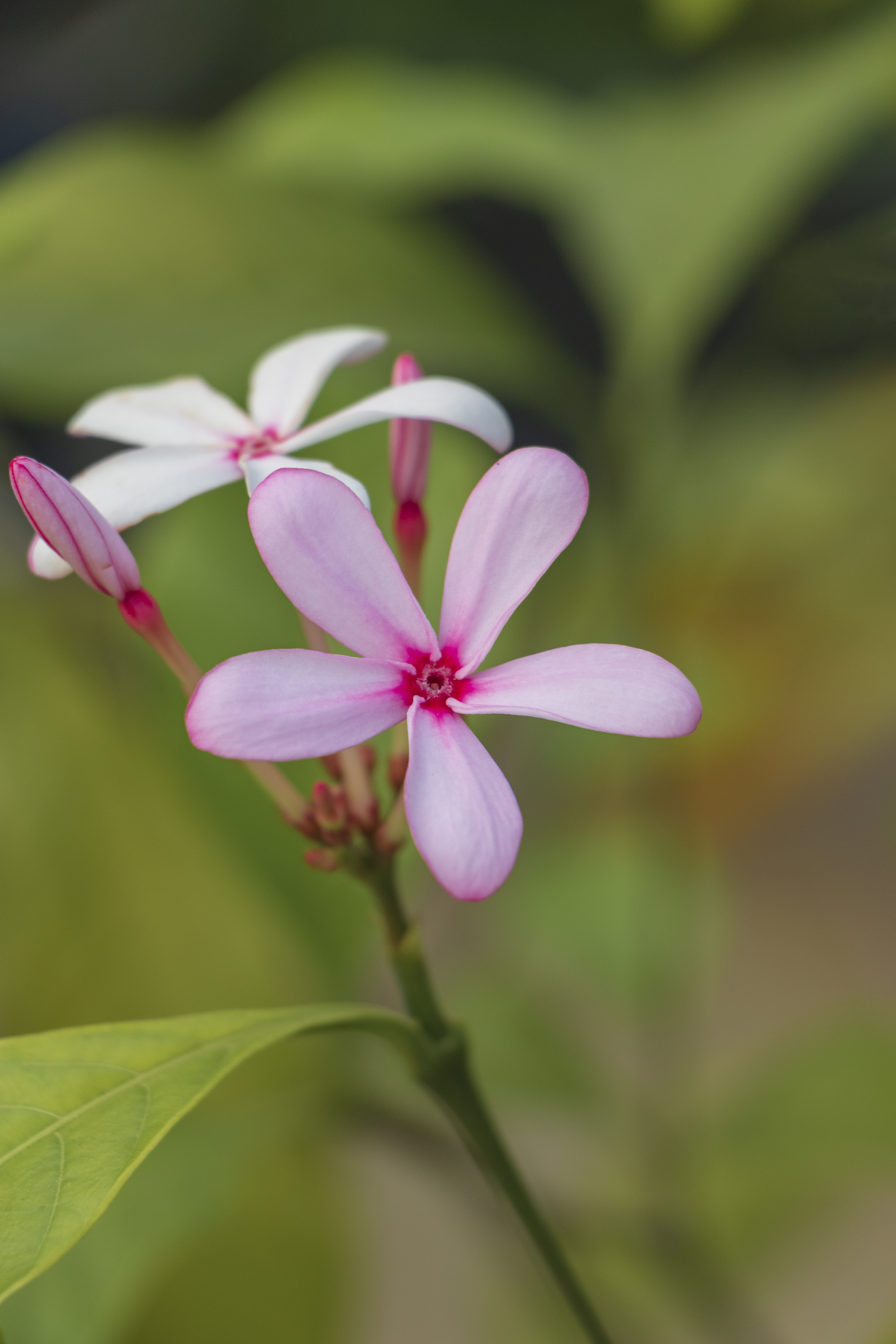
Kopsia

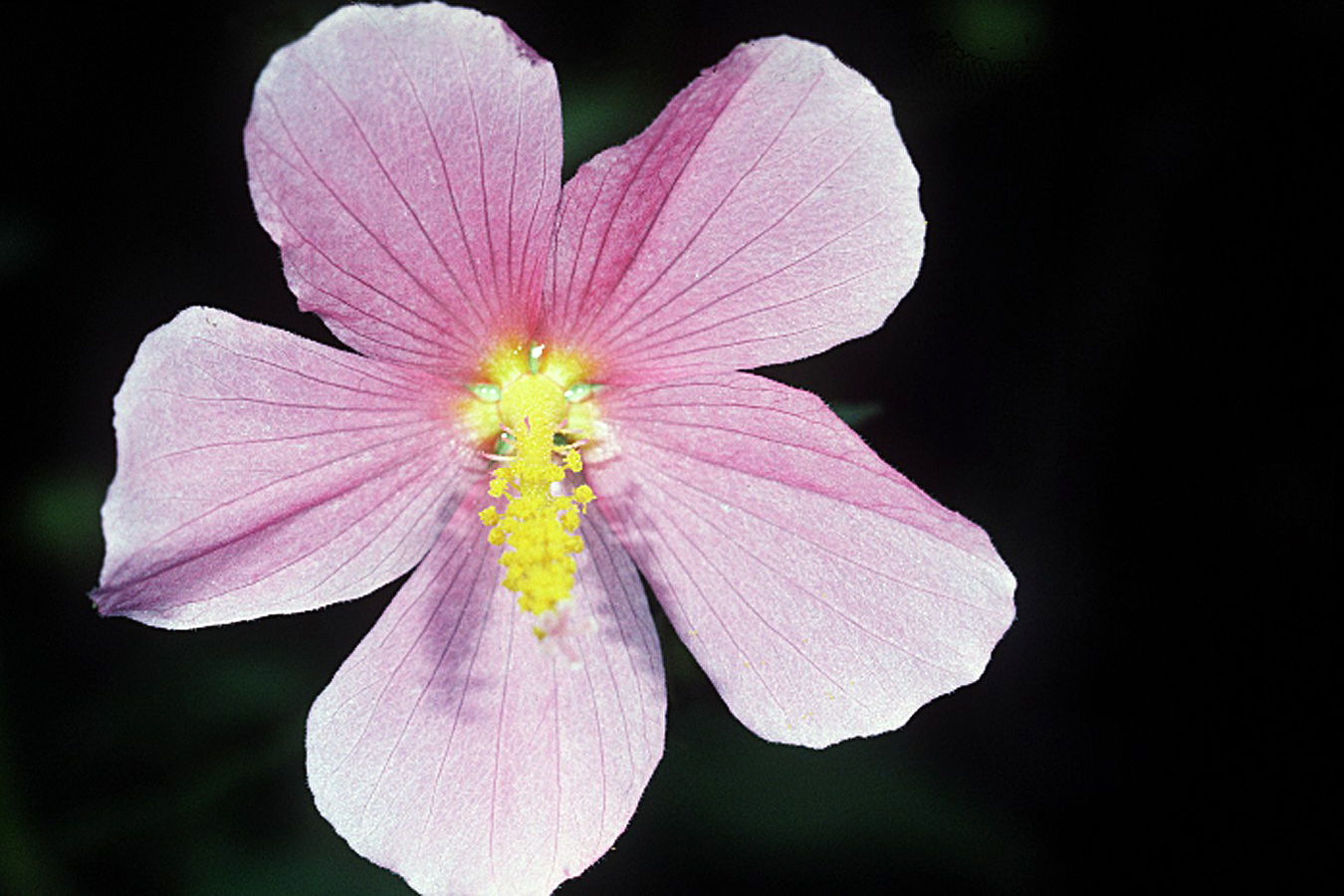
Kosteletzkya

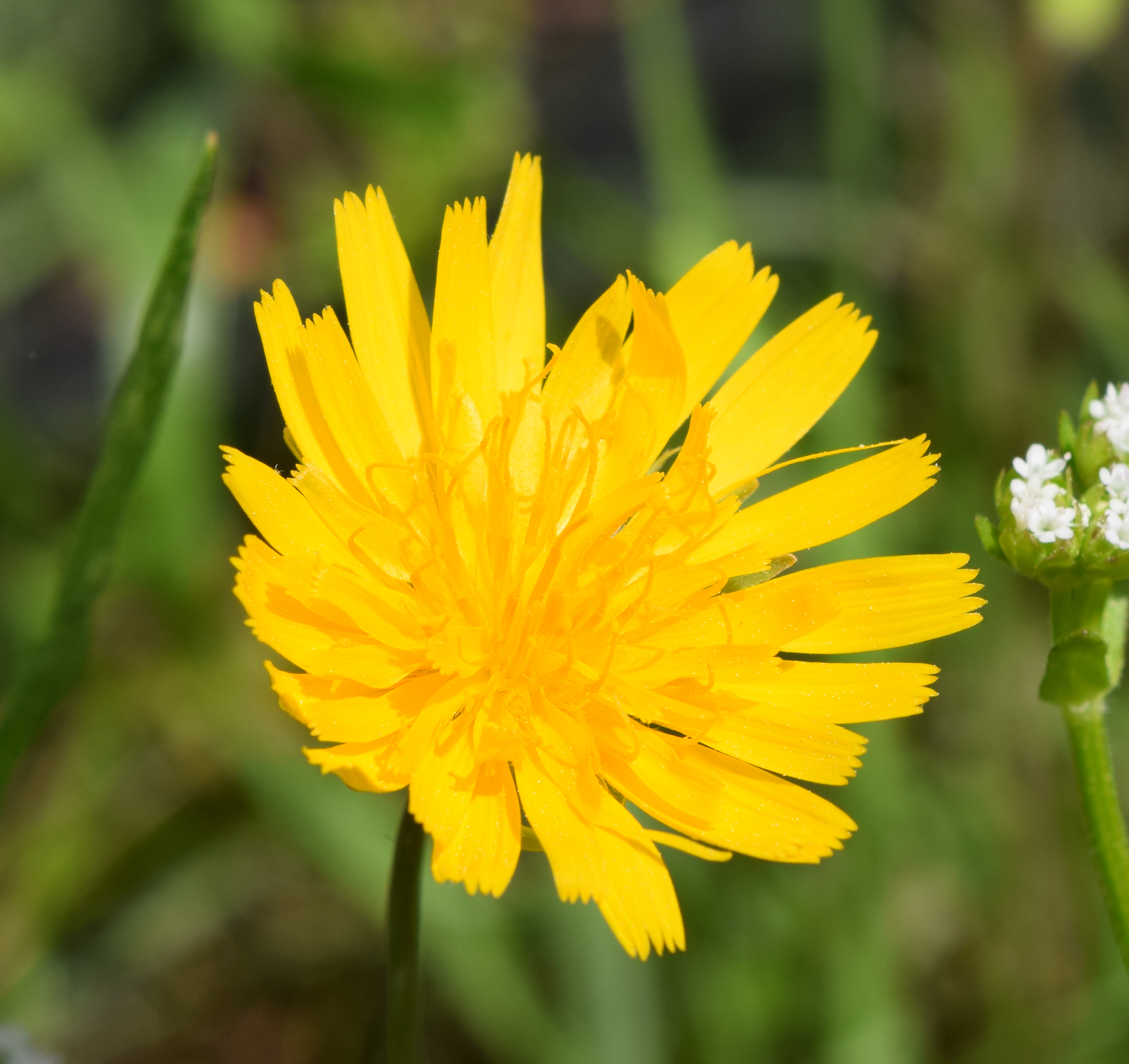
Krigia

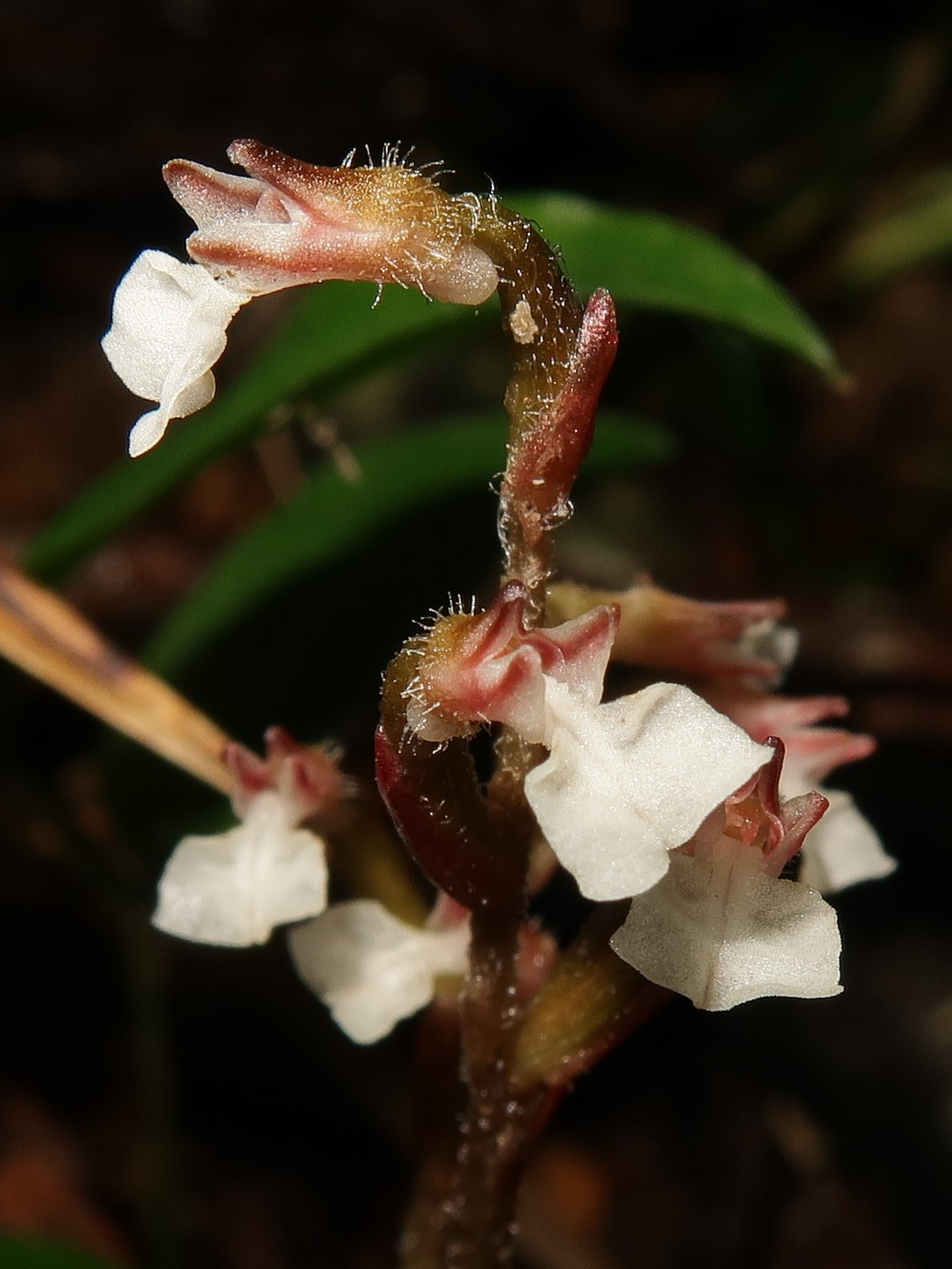
Kuhlhasseltia

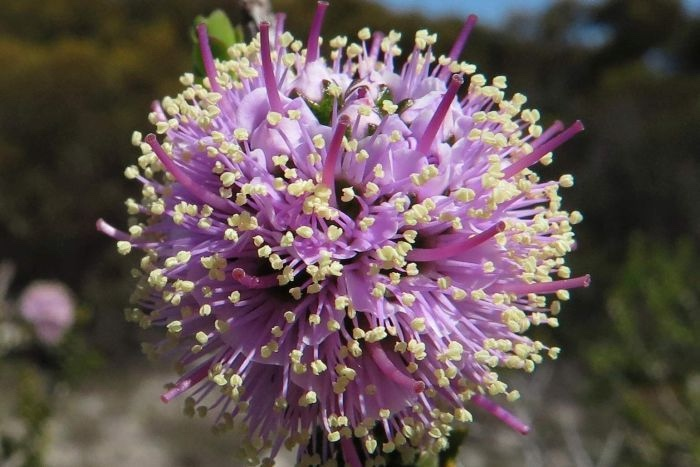
Kunzea

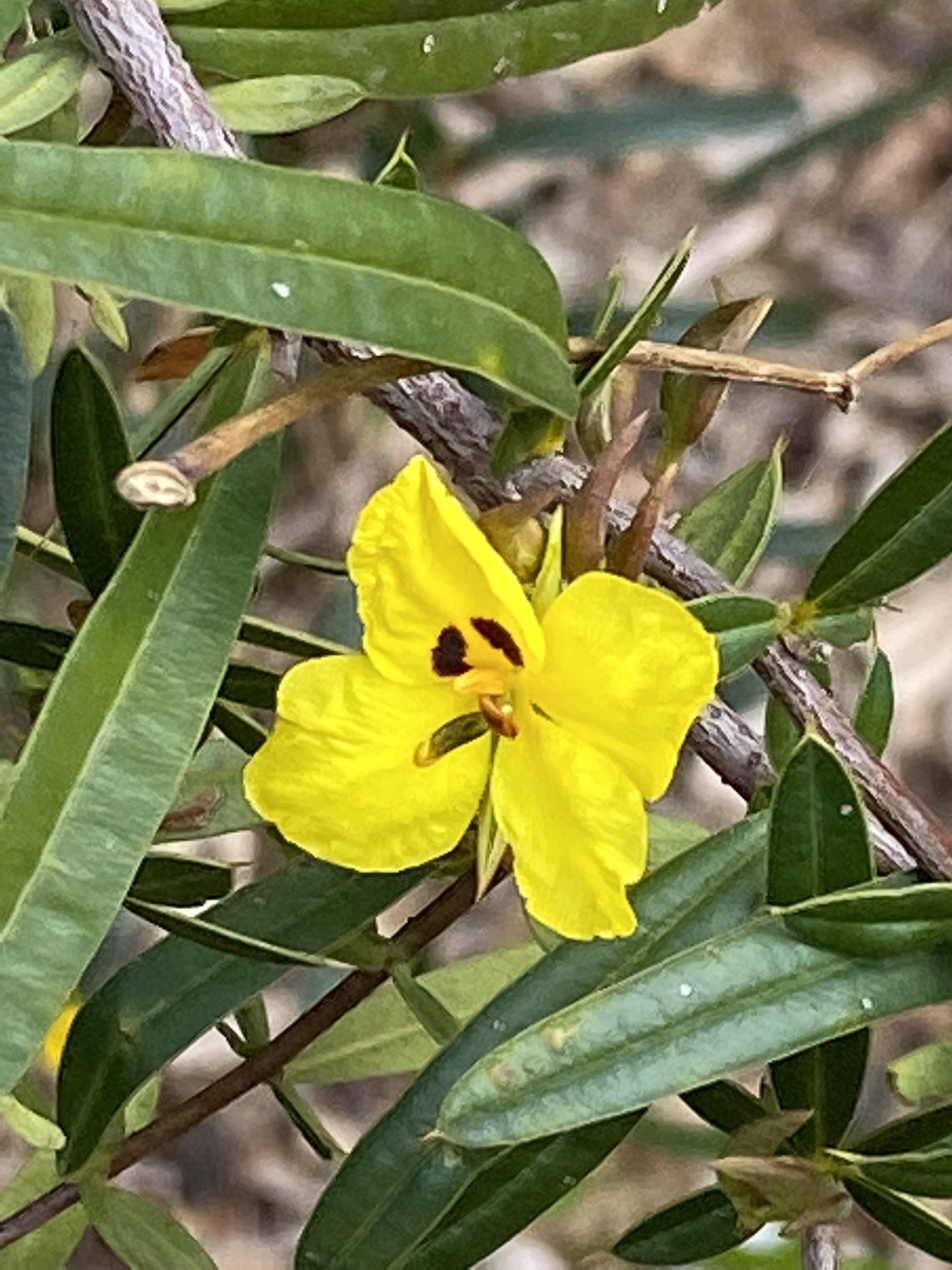
Labichea

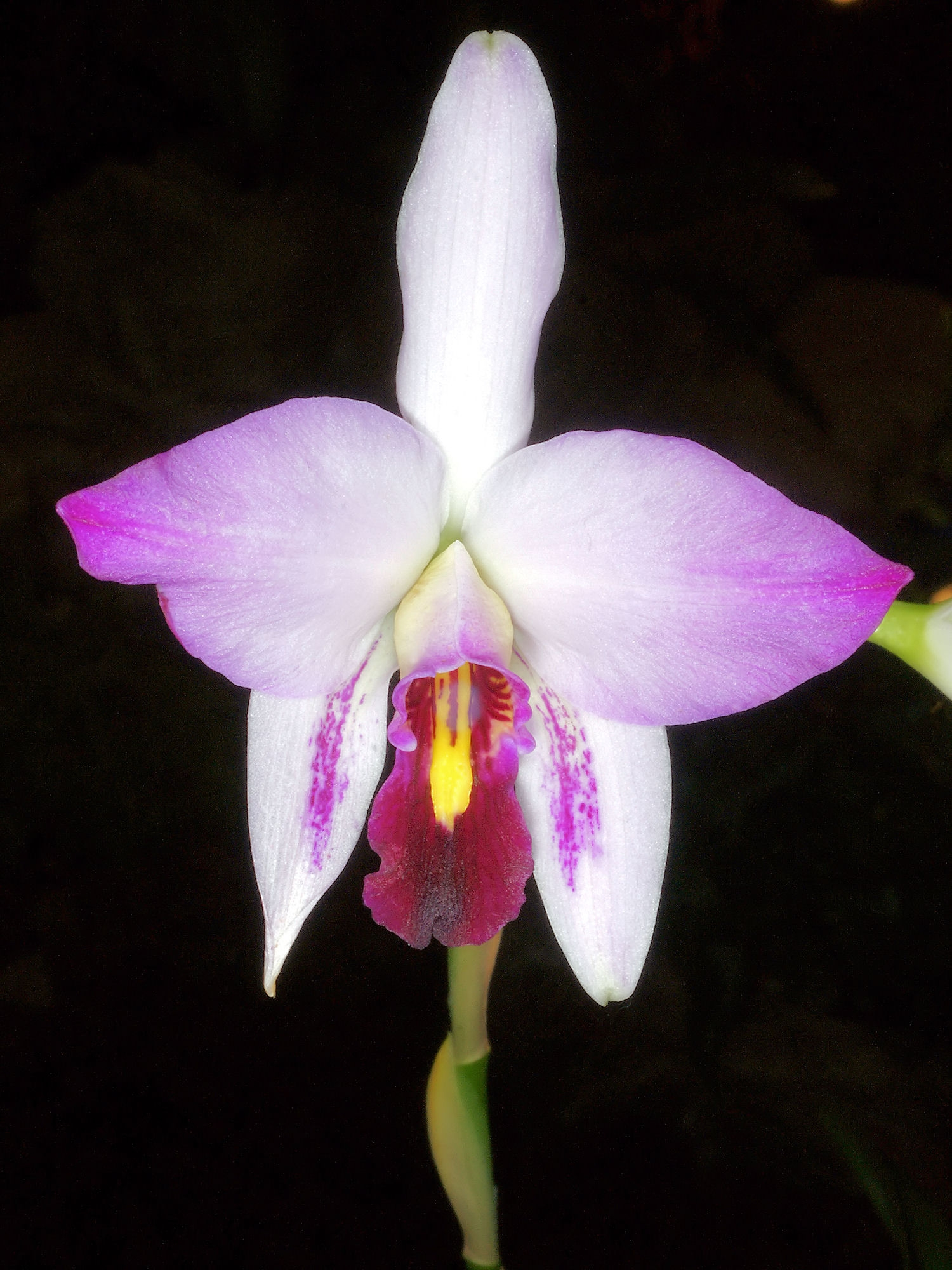
Laelia

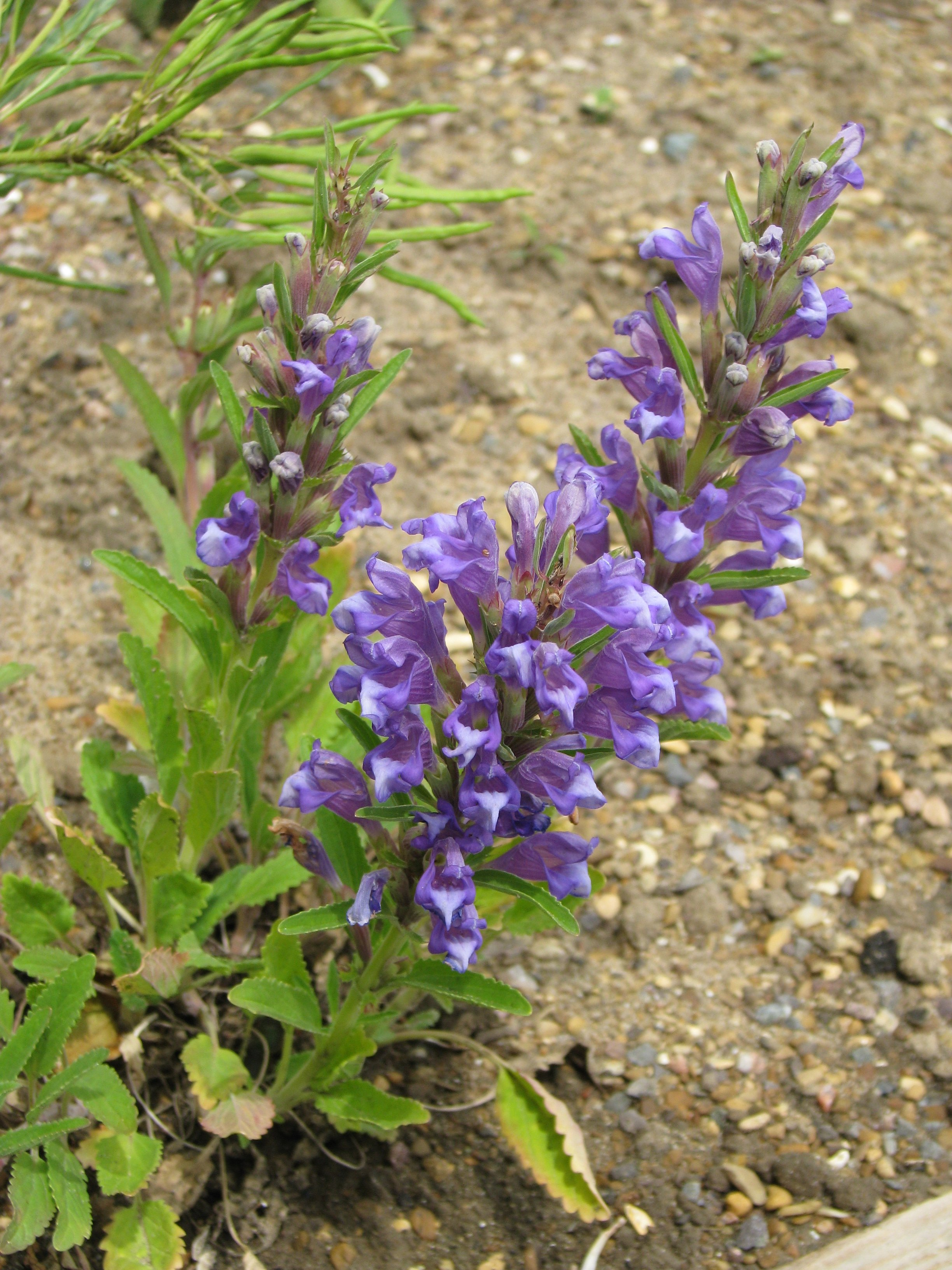
Lallemantia

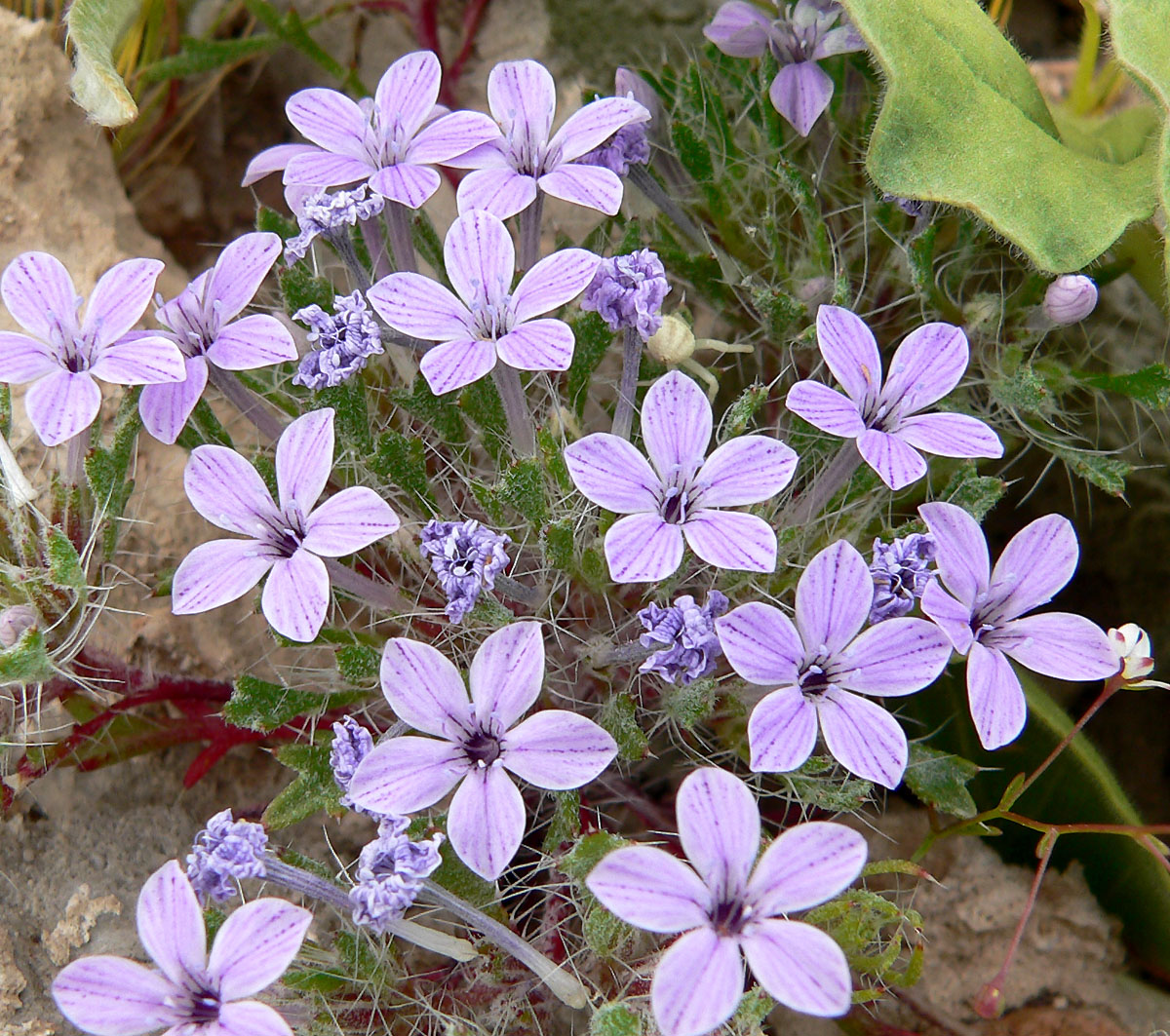
Langloisia

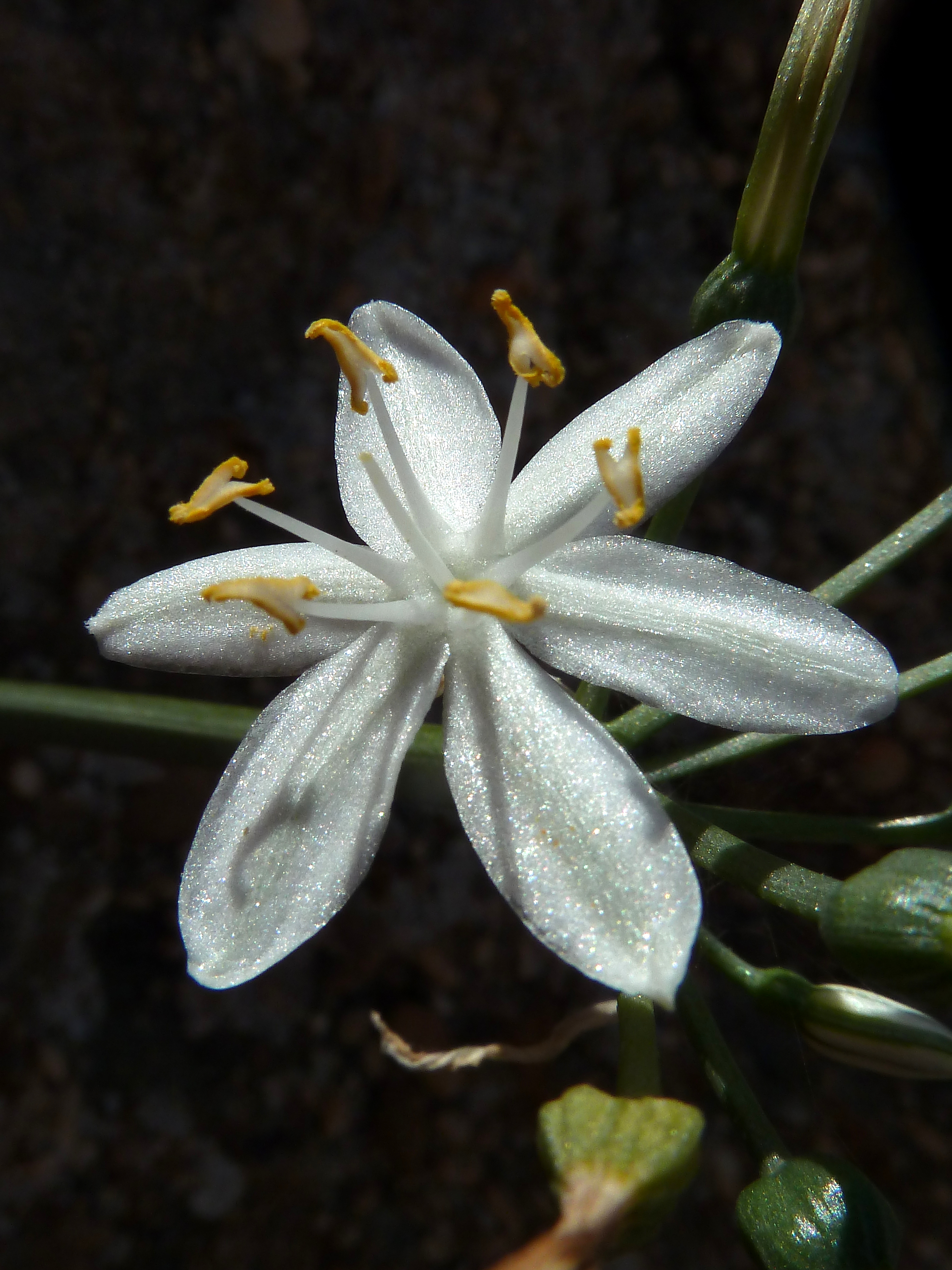
Lapiedra

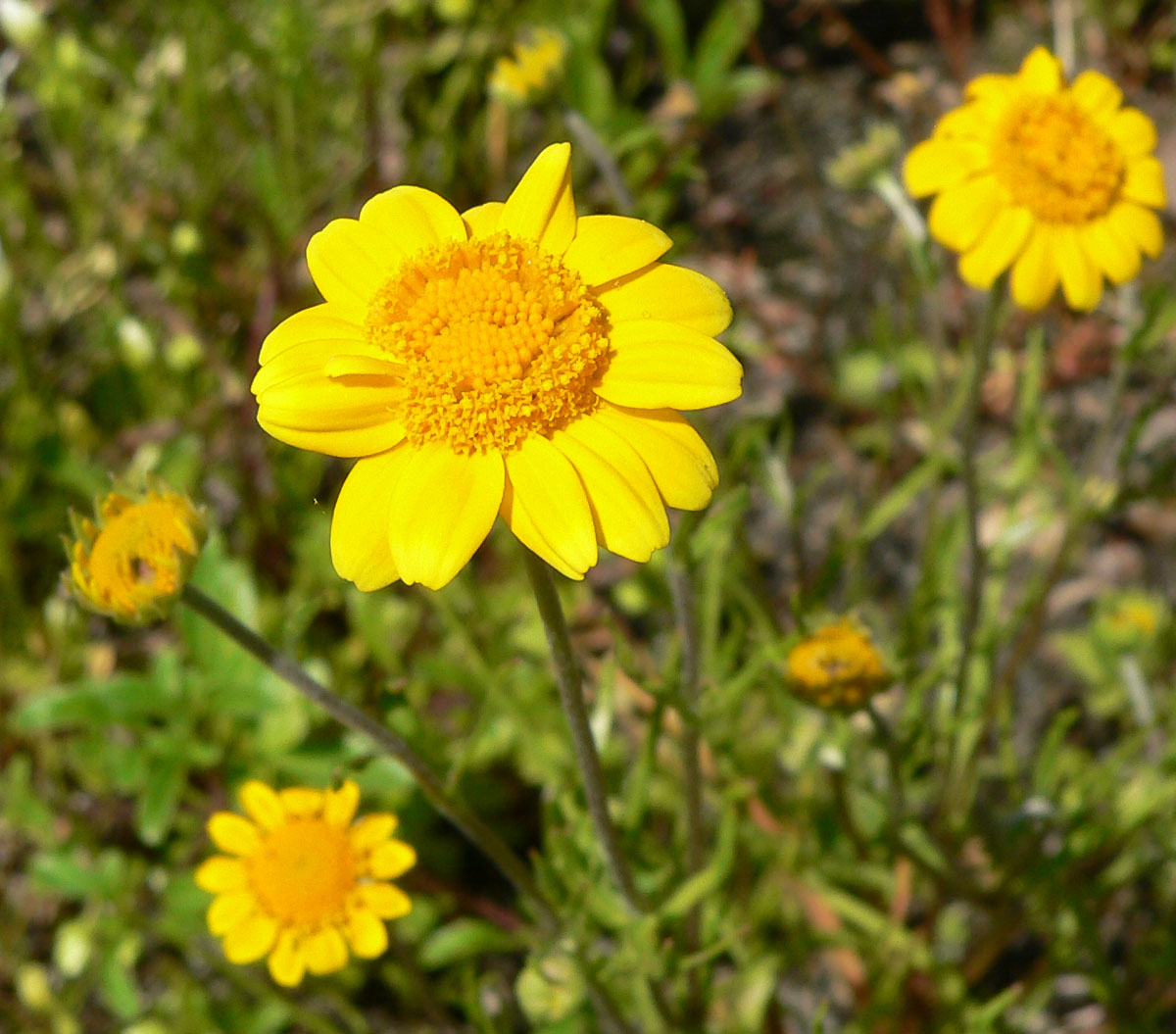
Lasthenia

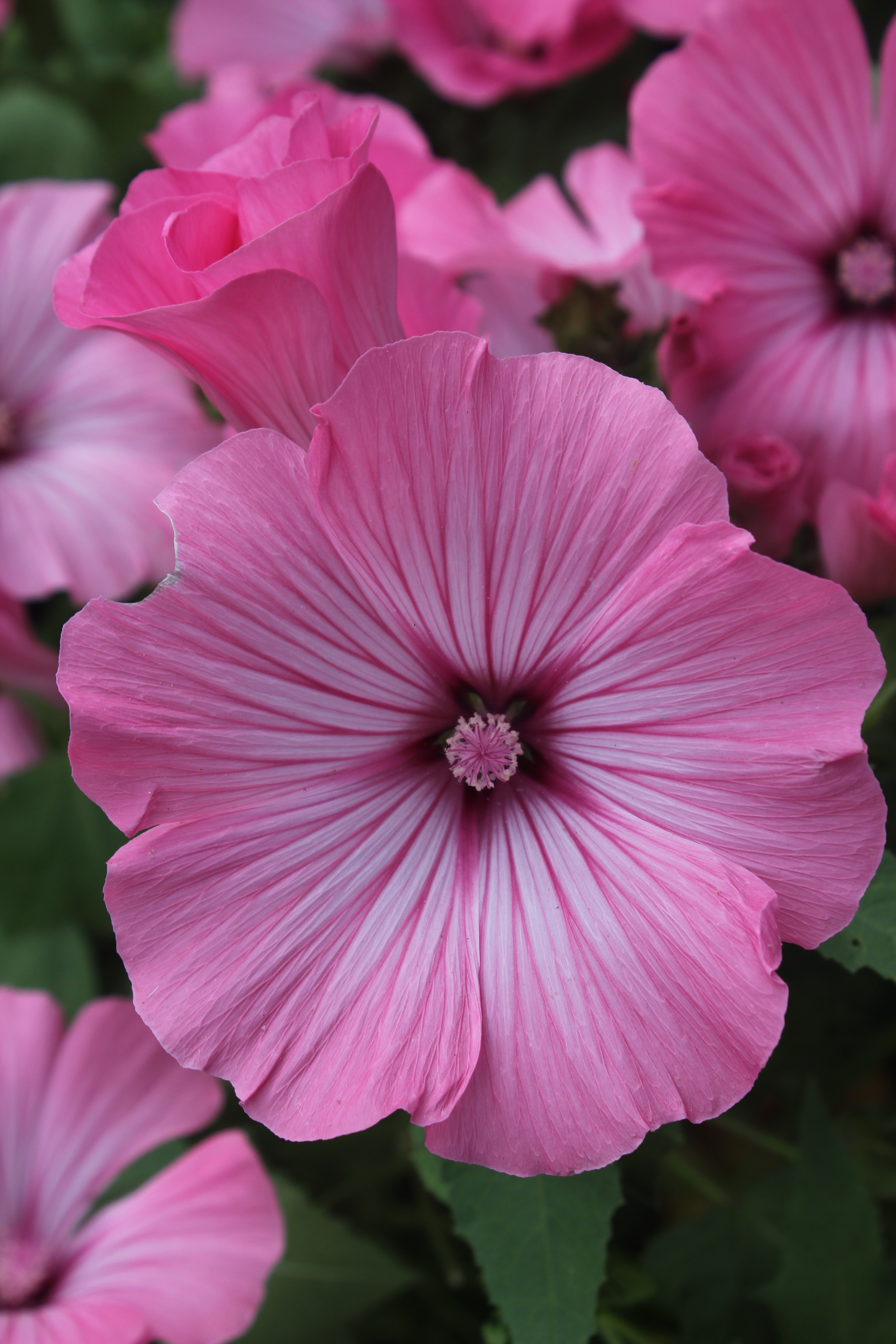
Lavatera

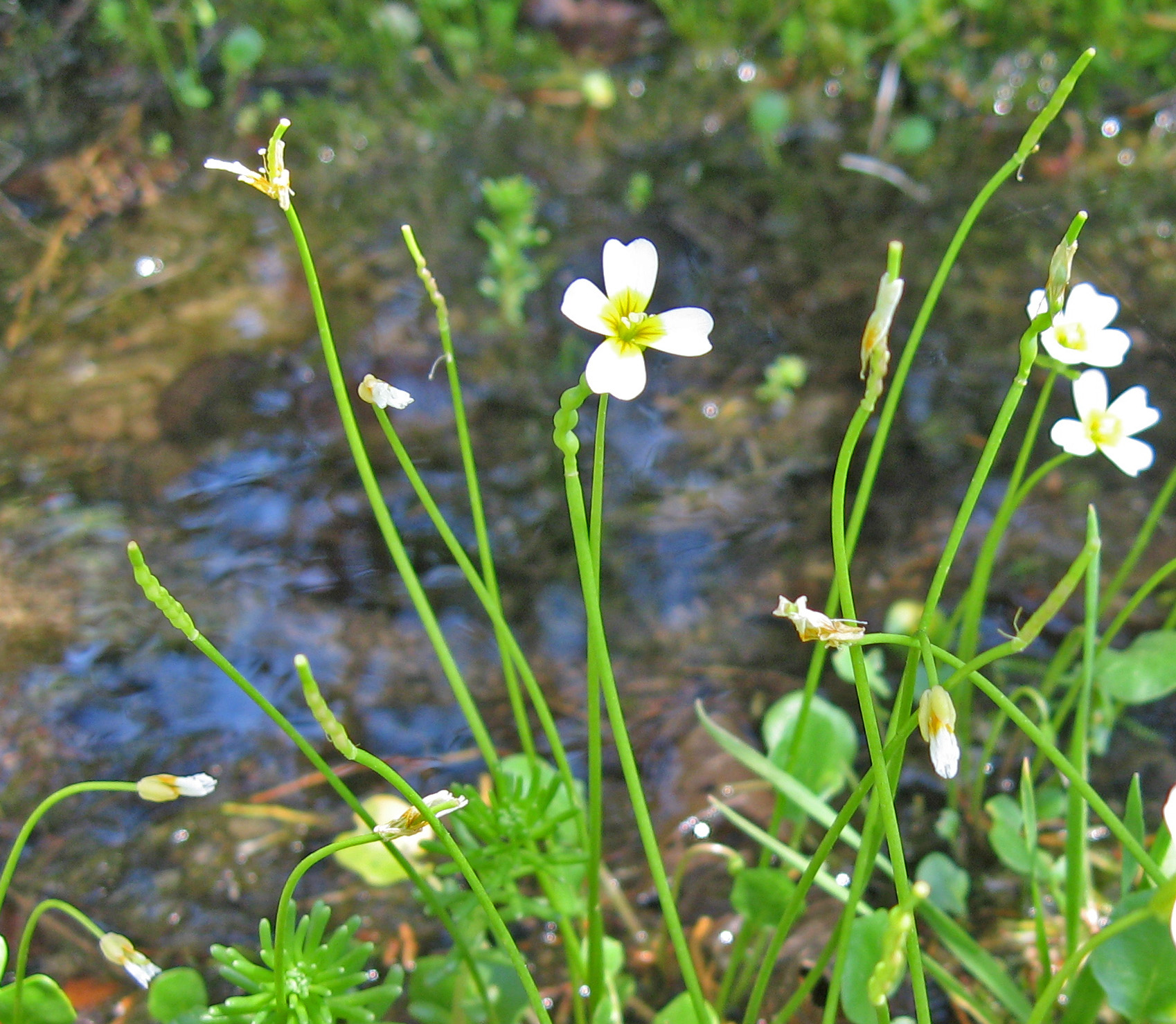
Leavenworthia

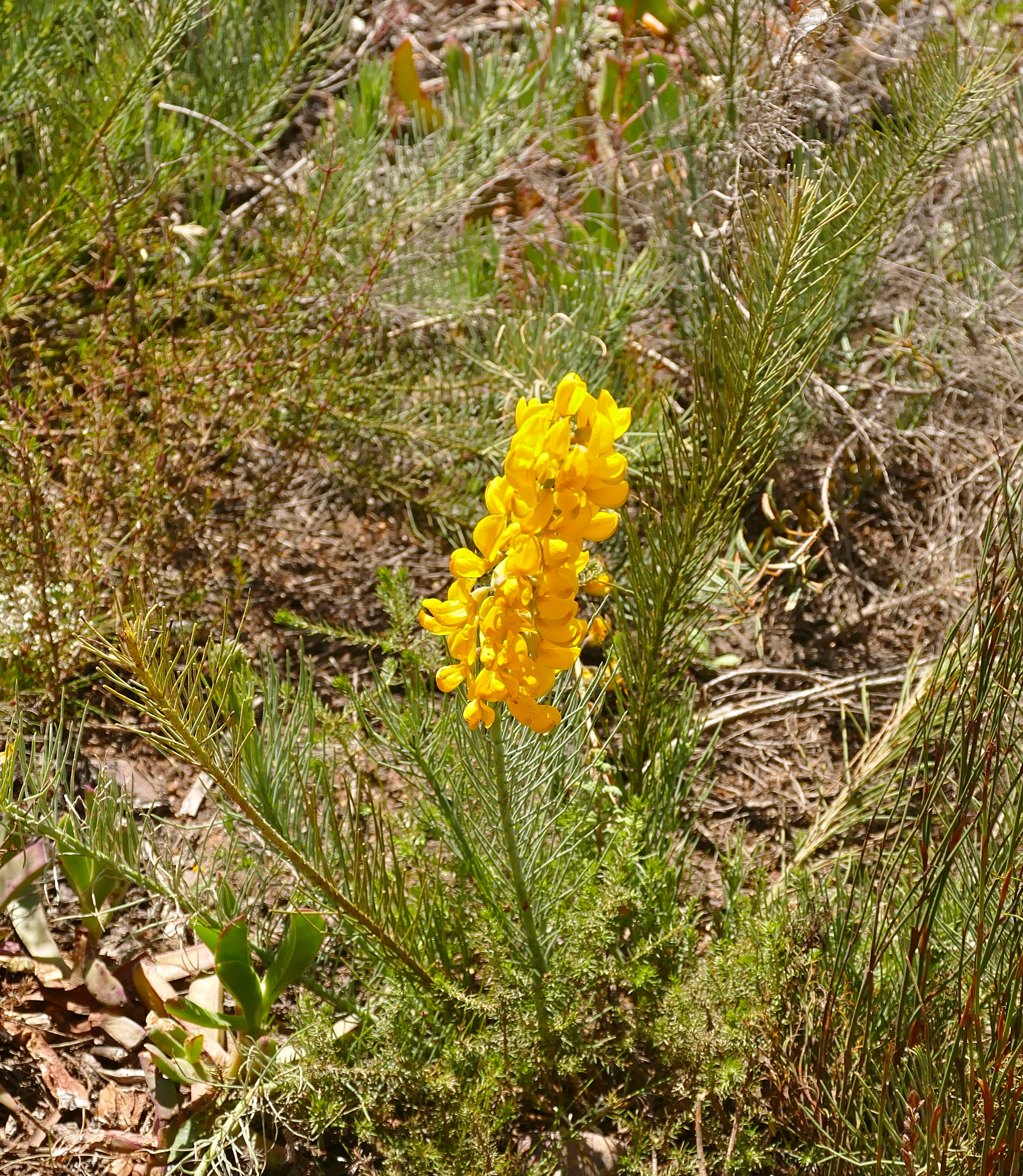
Lebeckia

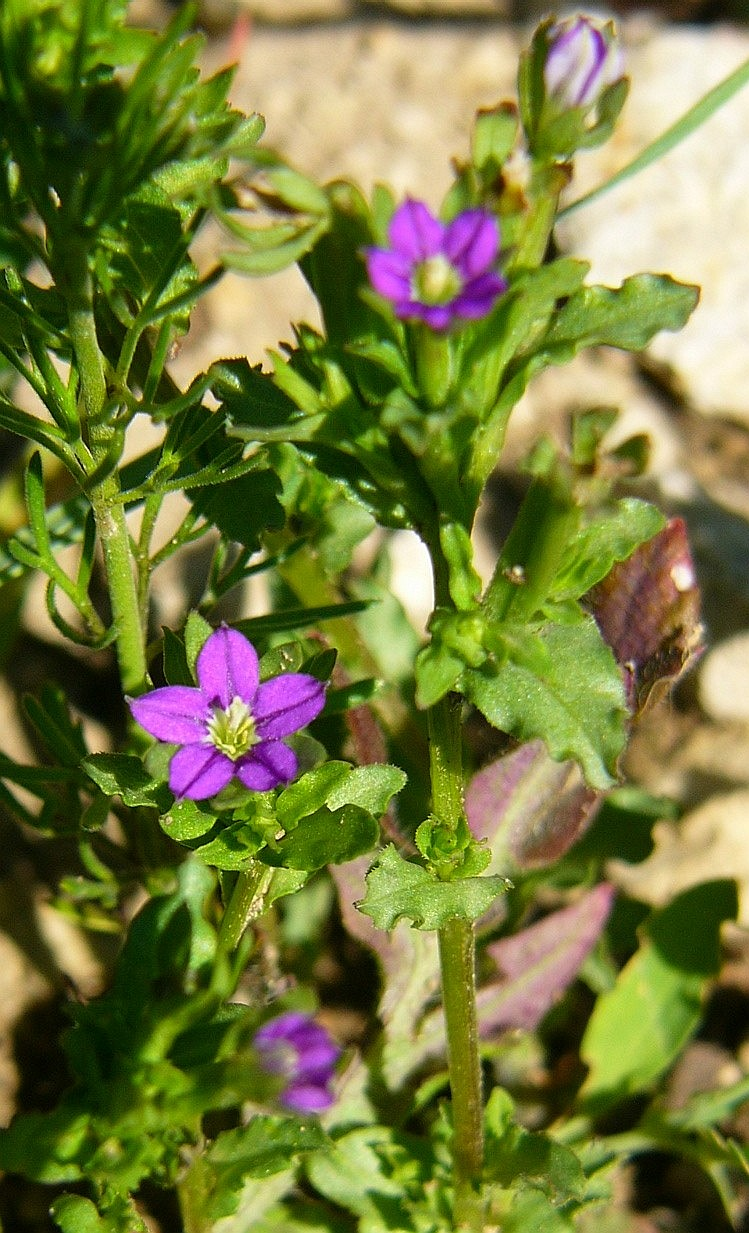
Legousia

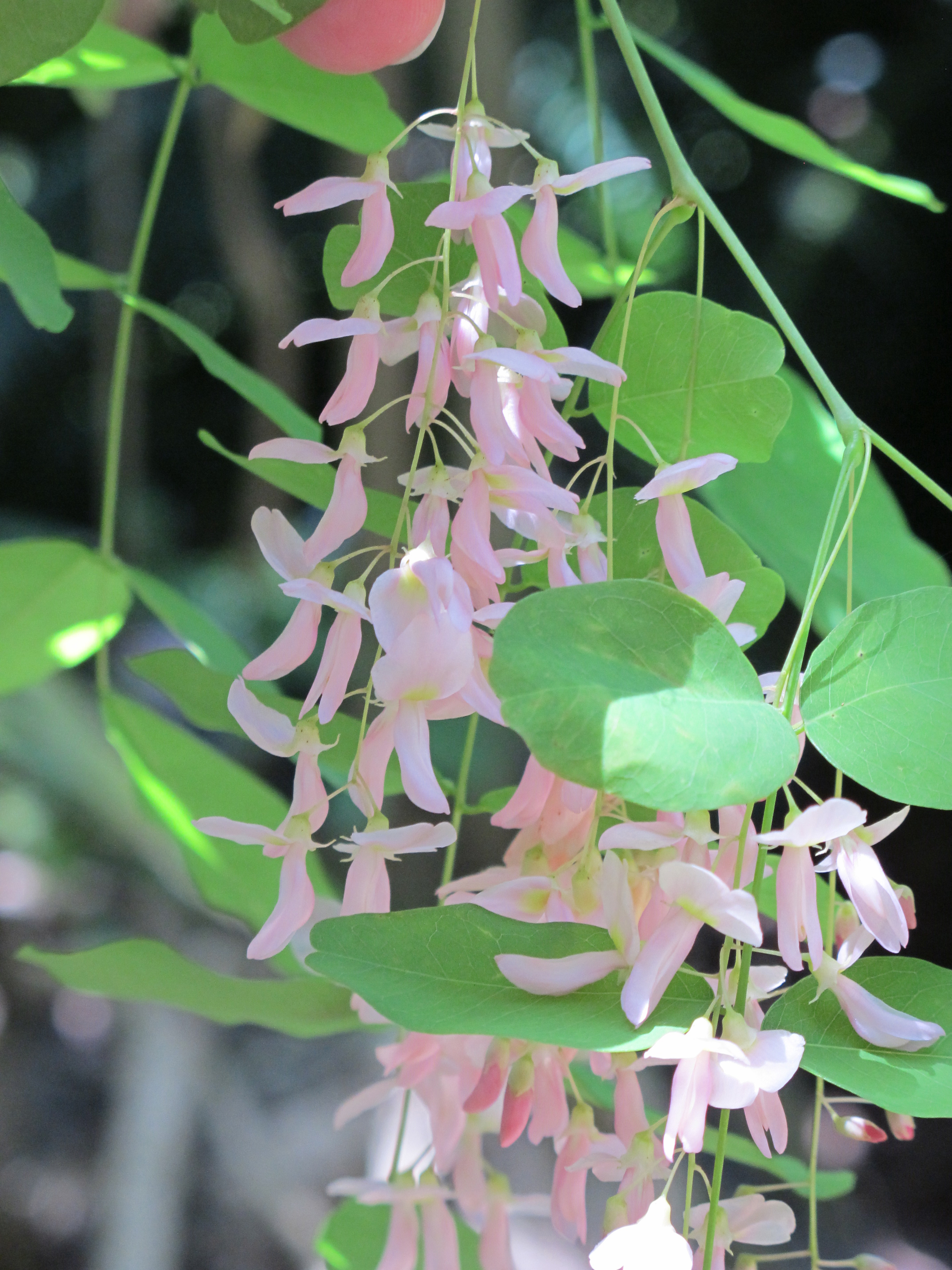
Lennea

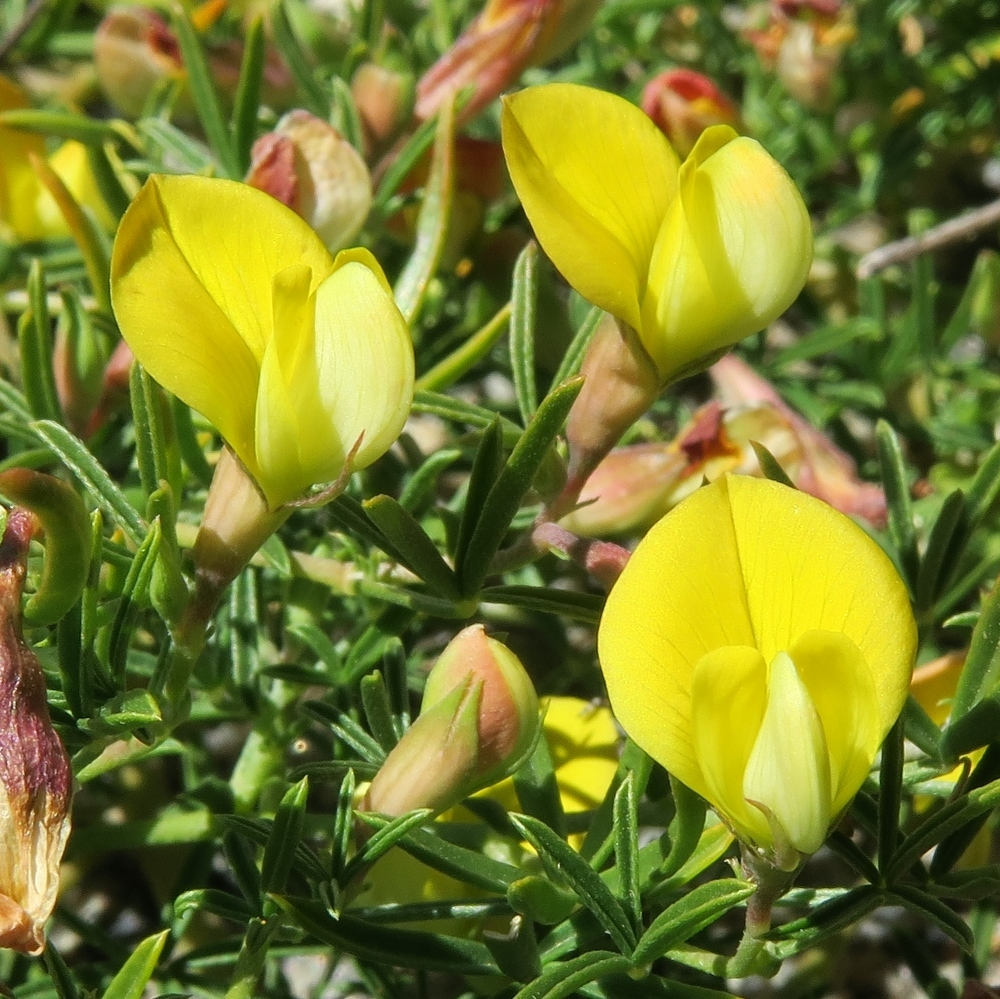
Leobordea

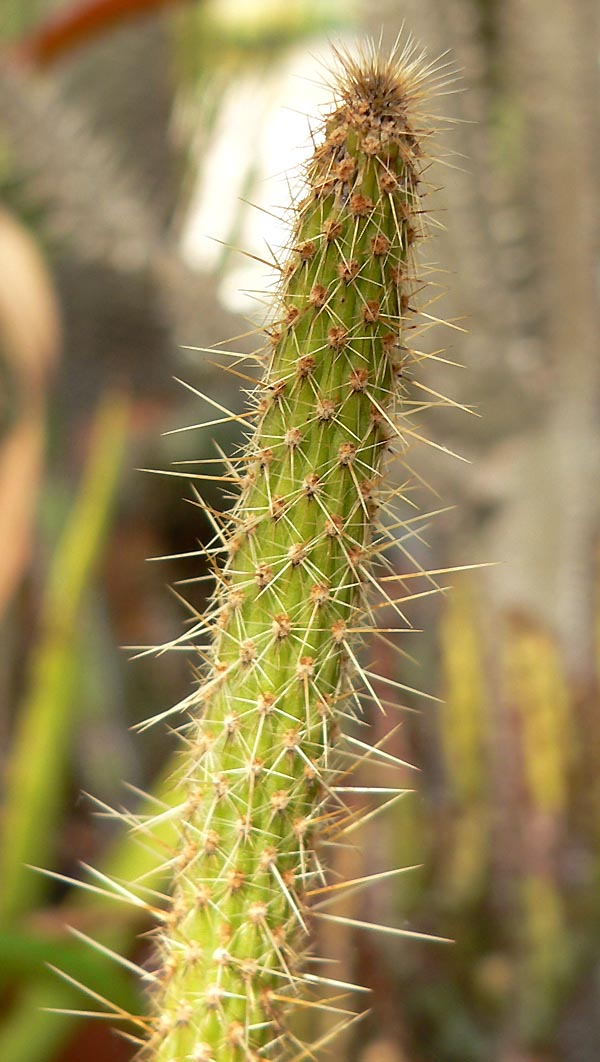
Leocereus

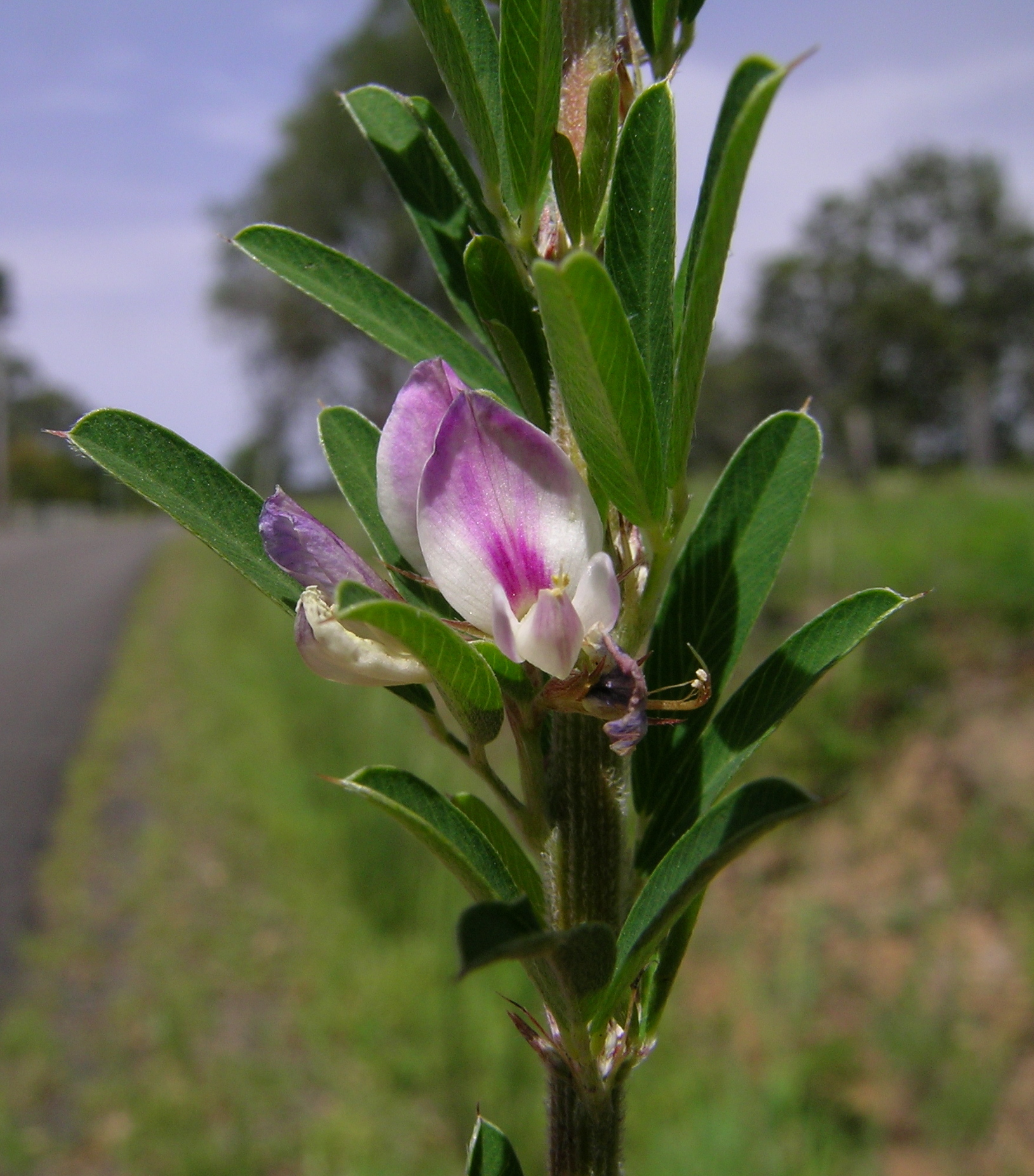
Lespedeza

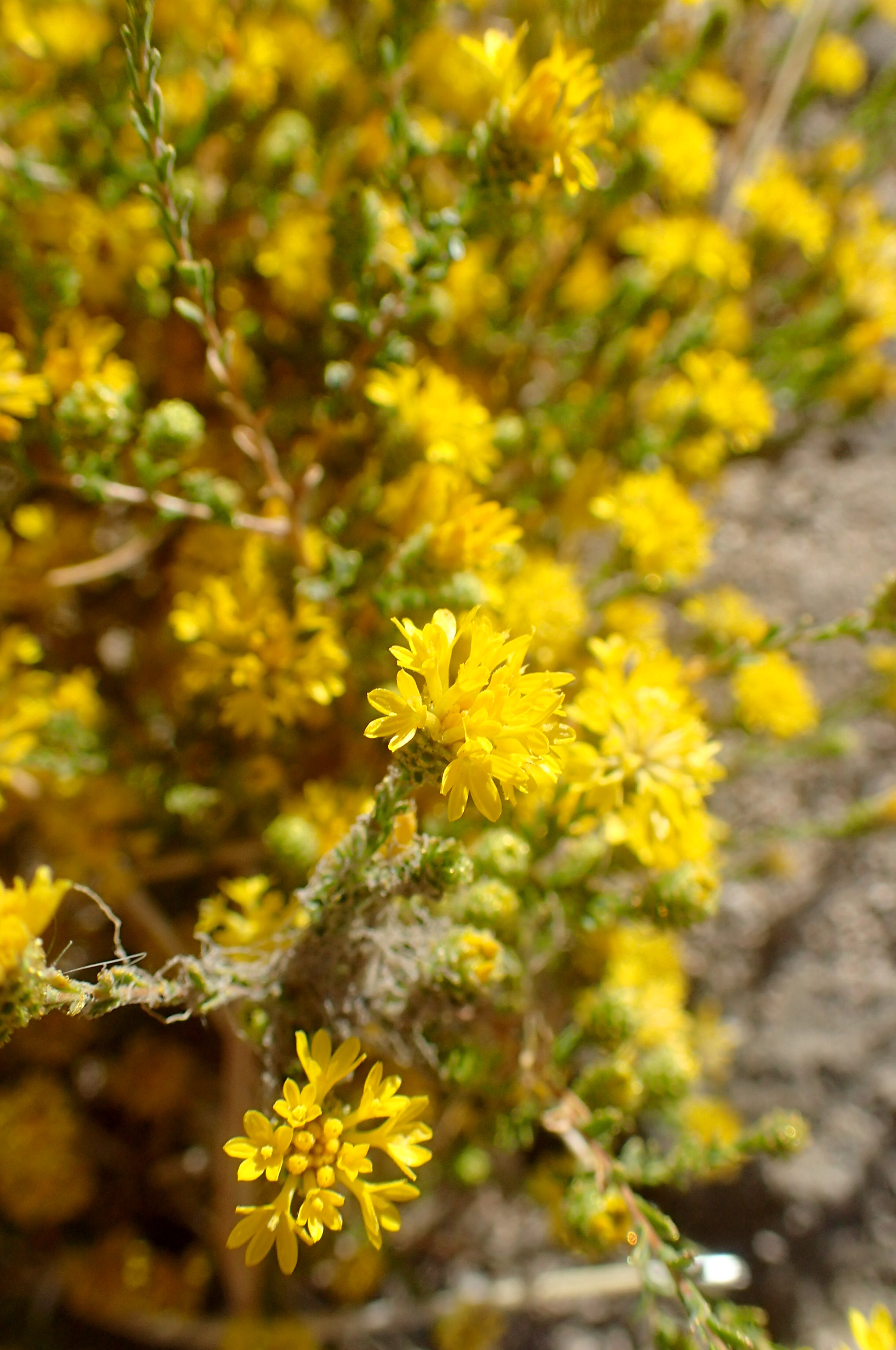
Lessingia

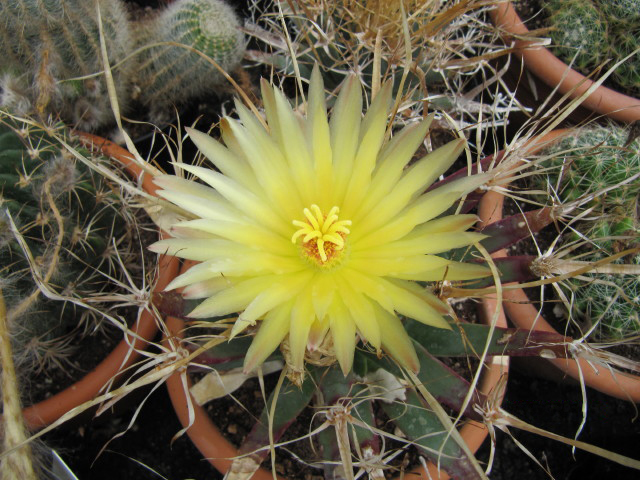
Leuchtenbergia

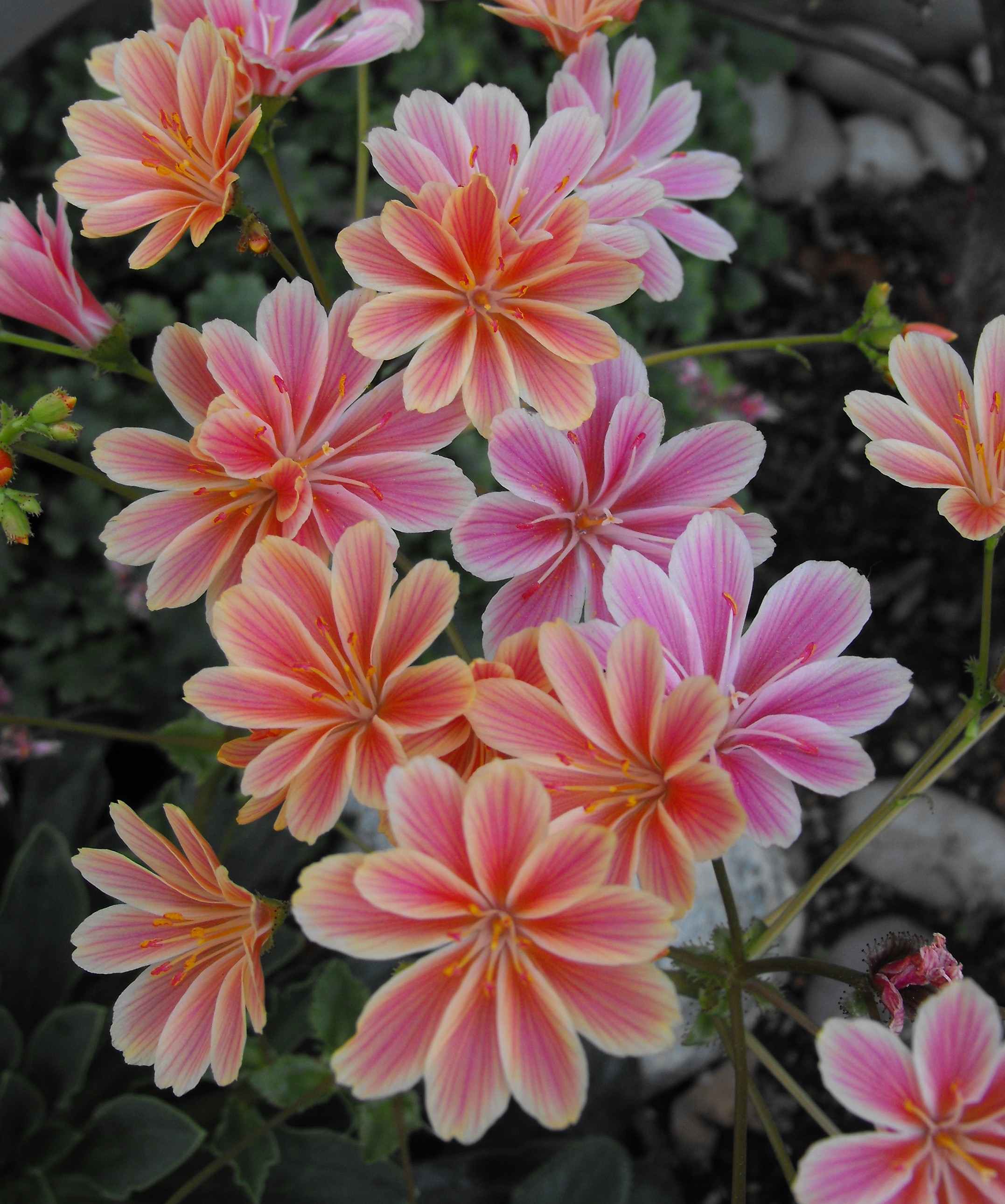
Lewisia

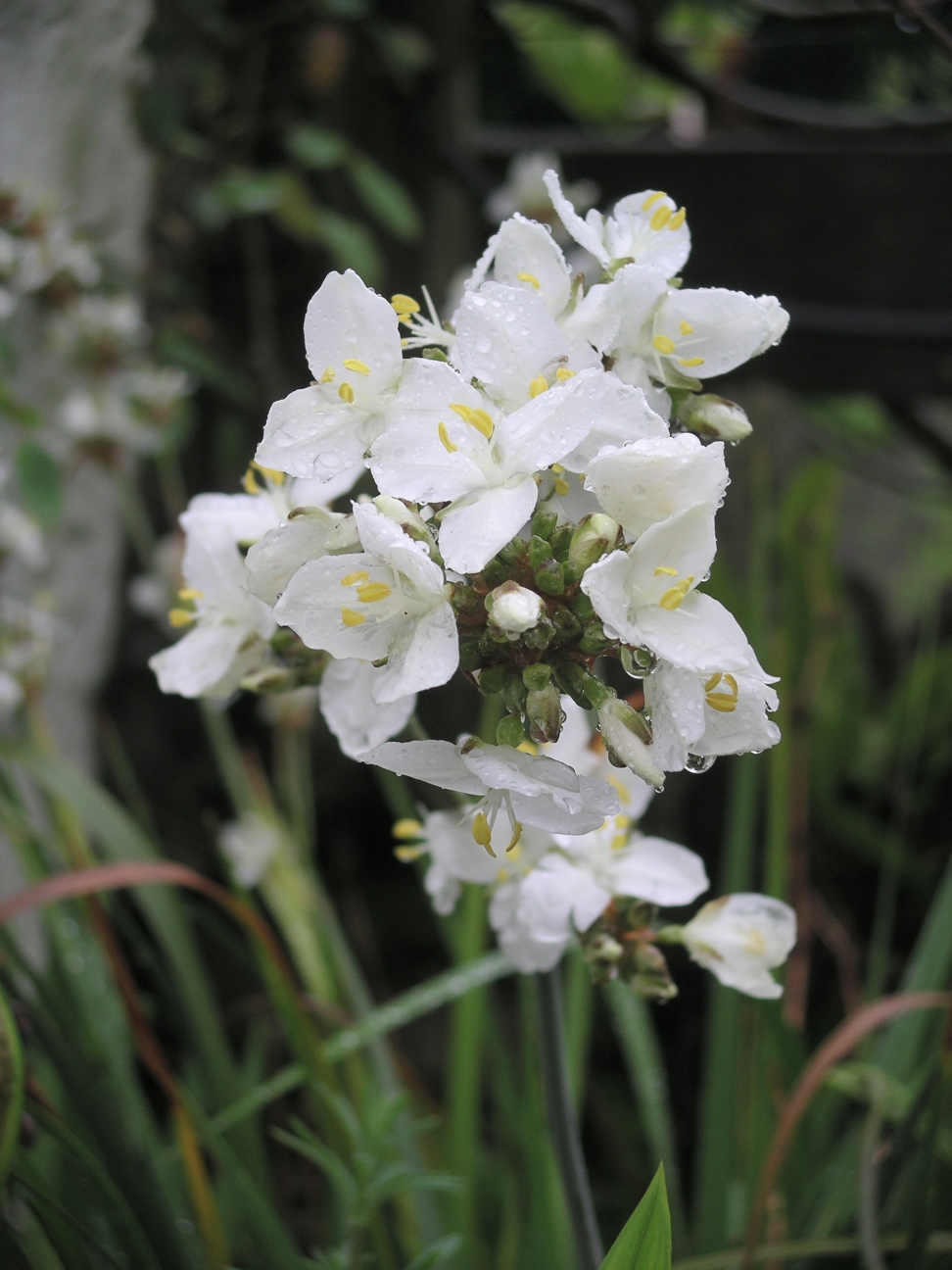
Libertia

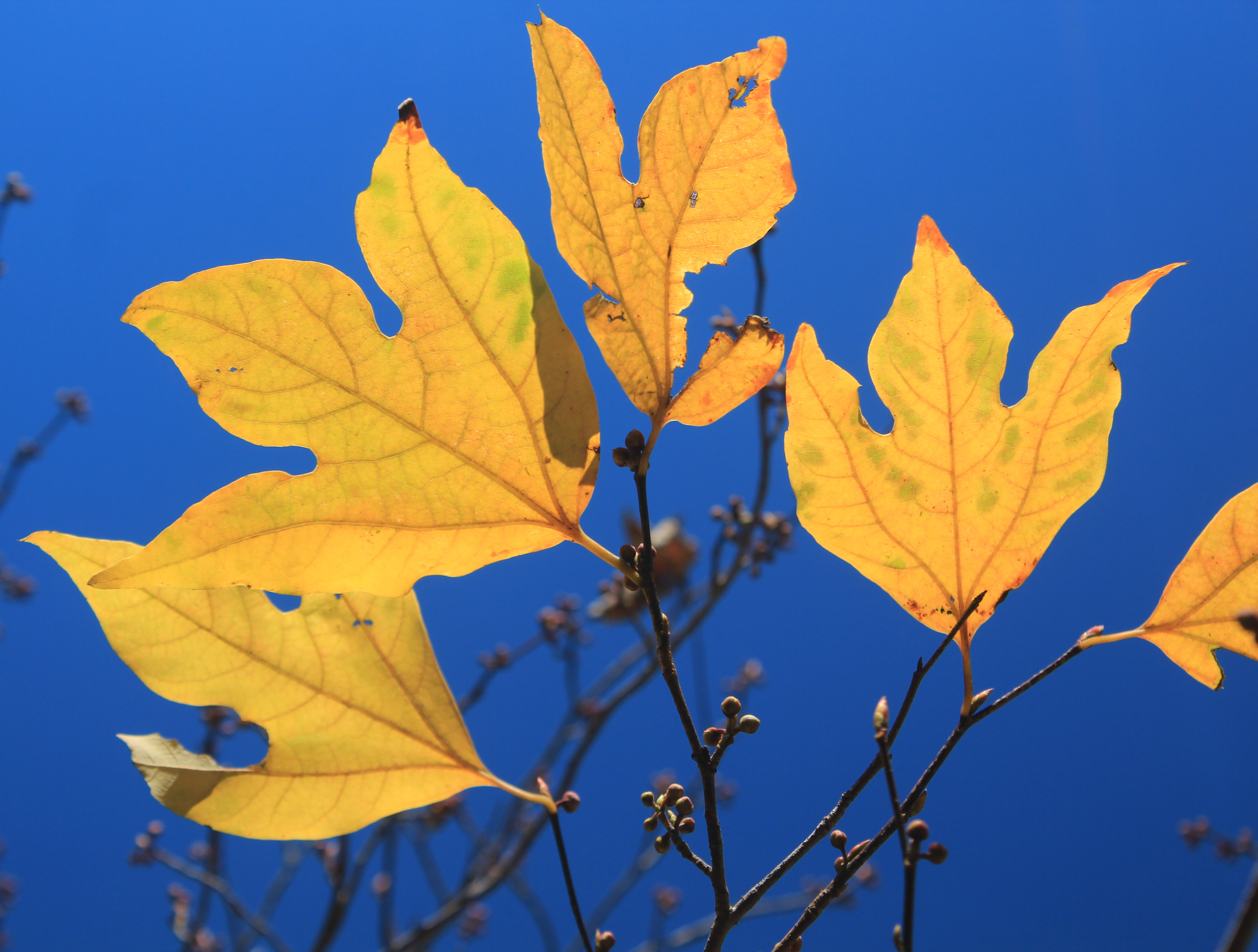
Lindera

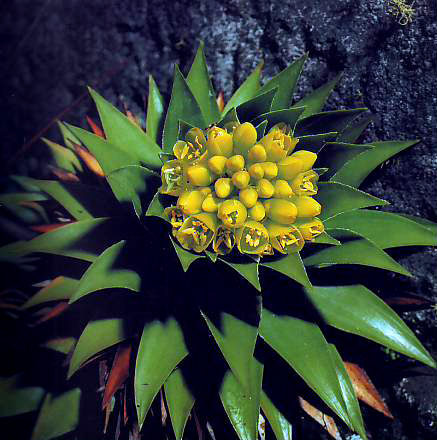
Lindmania

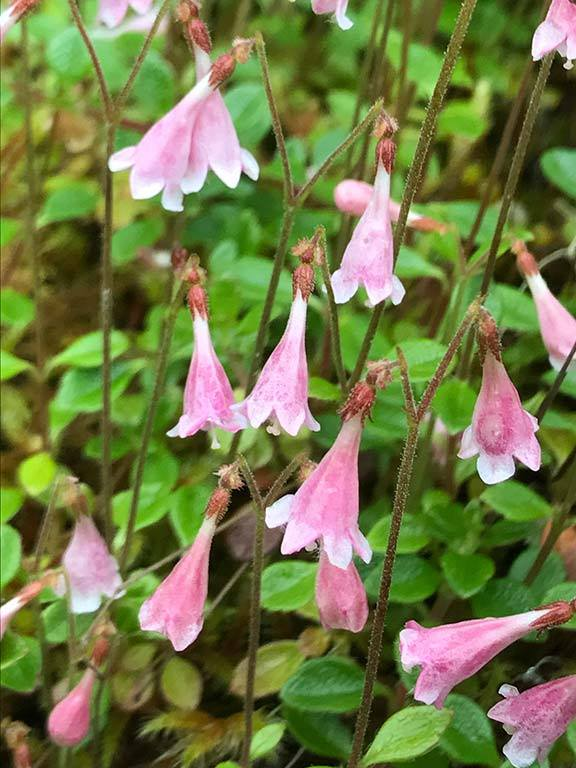
Linnaea

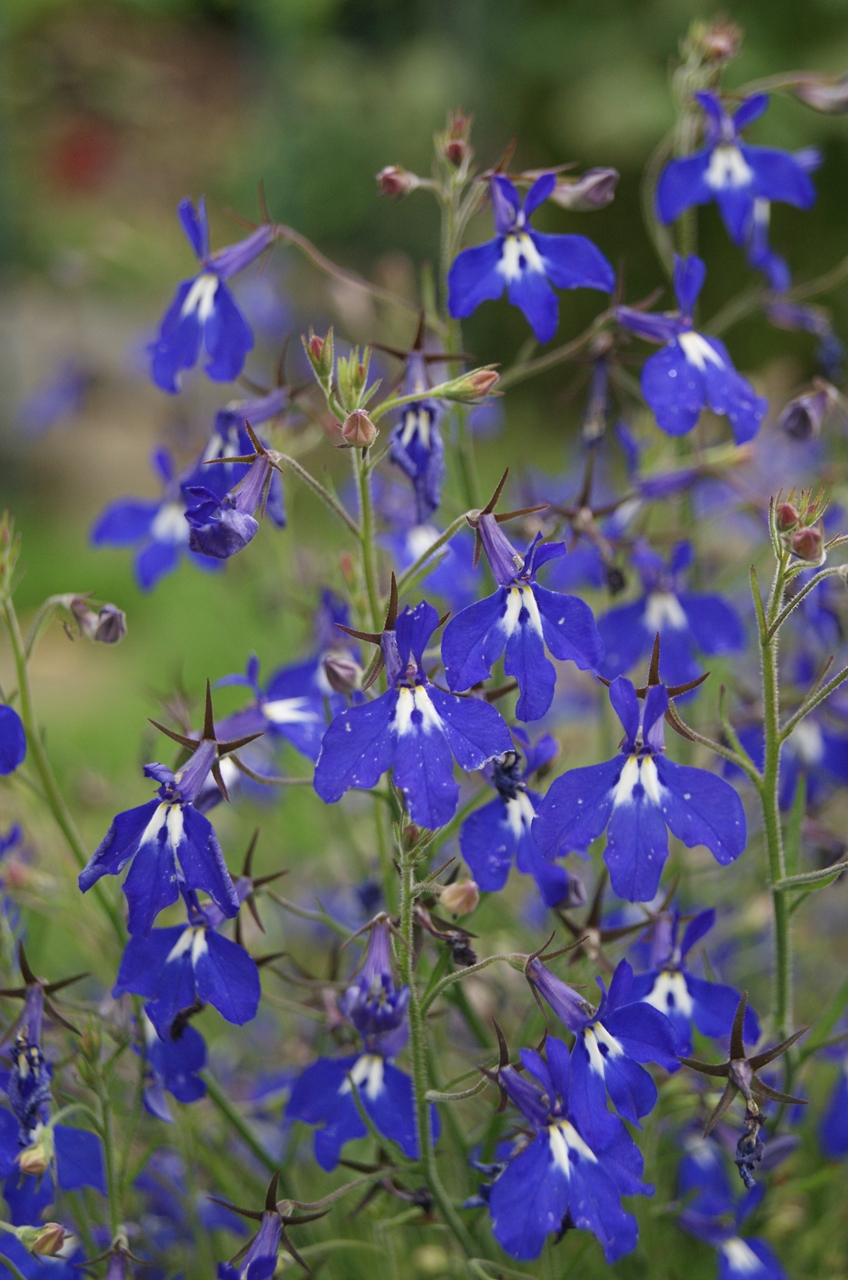
Lobelia

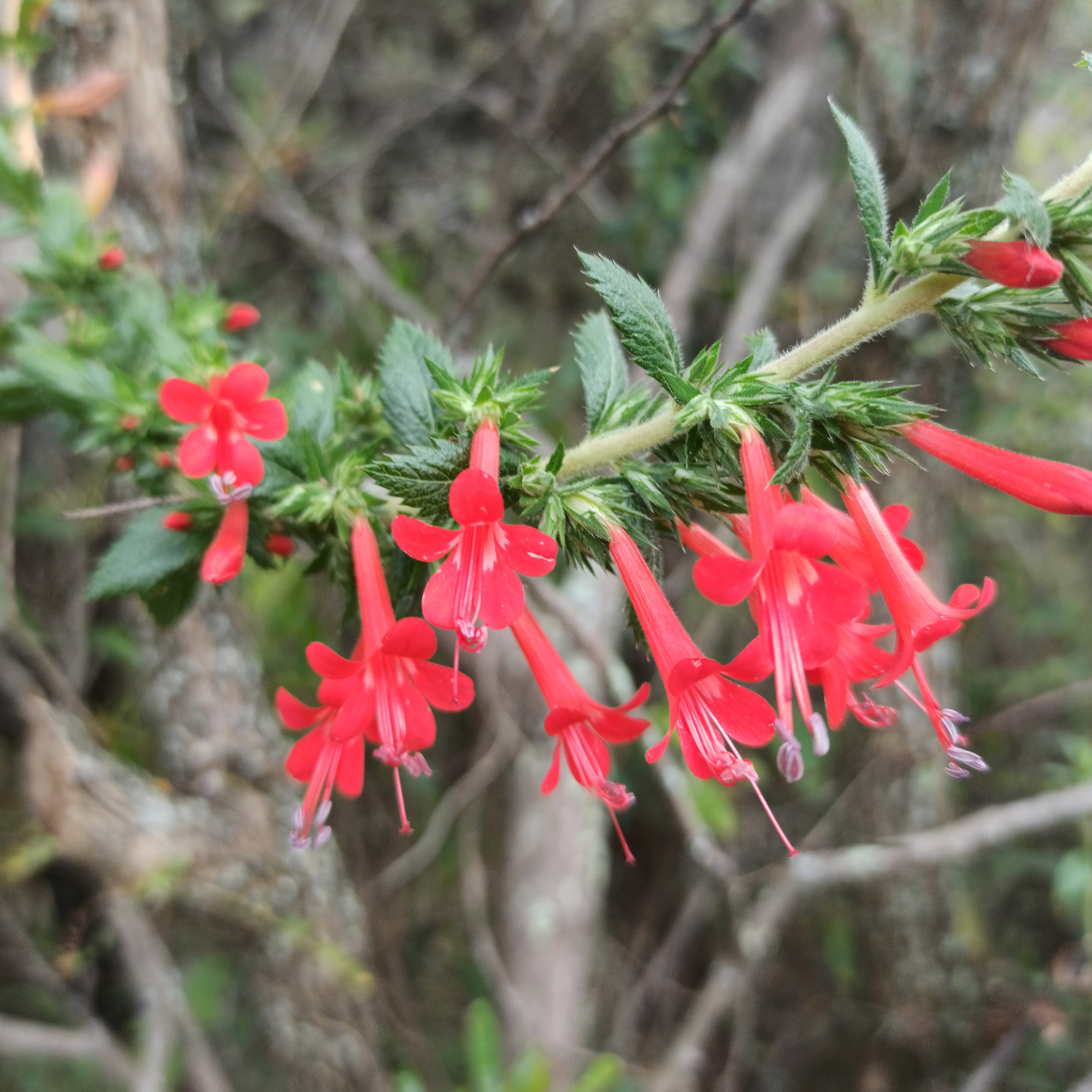
Loeselia

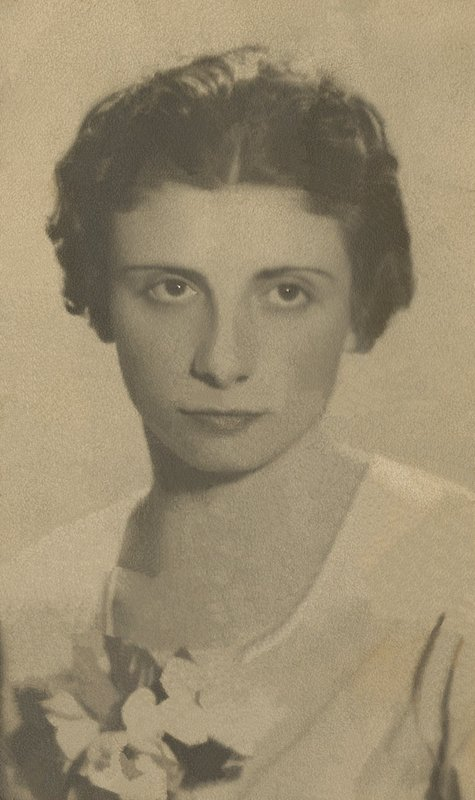
Alicia Lourteig

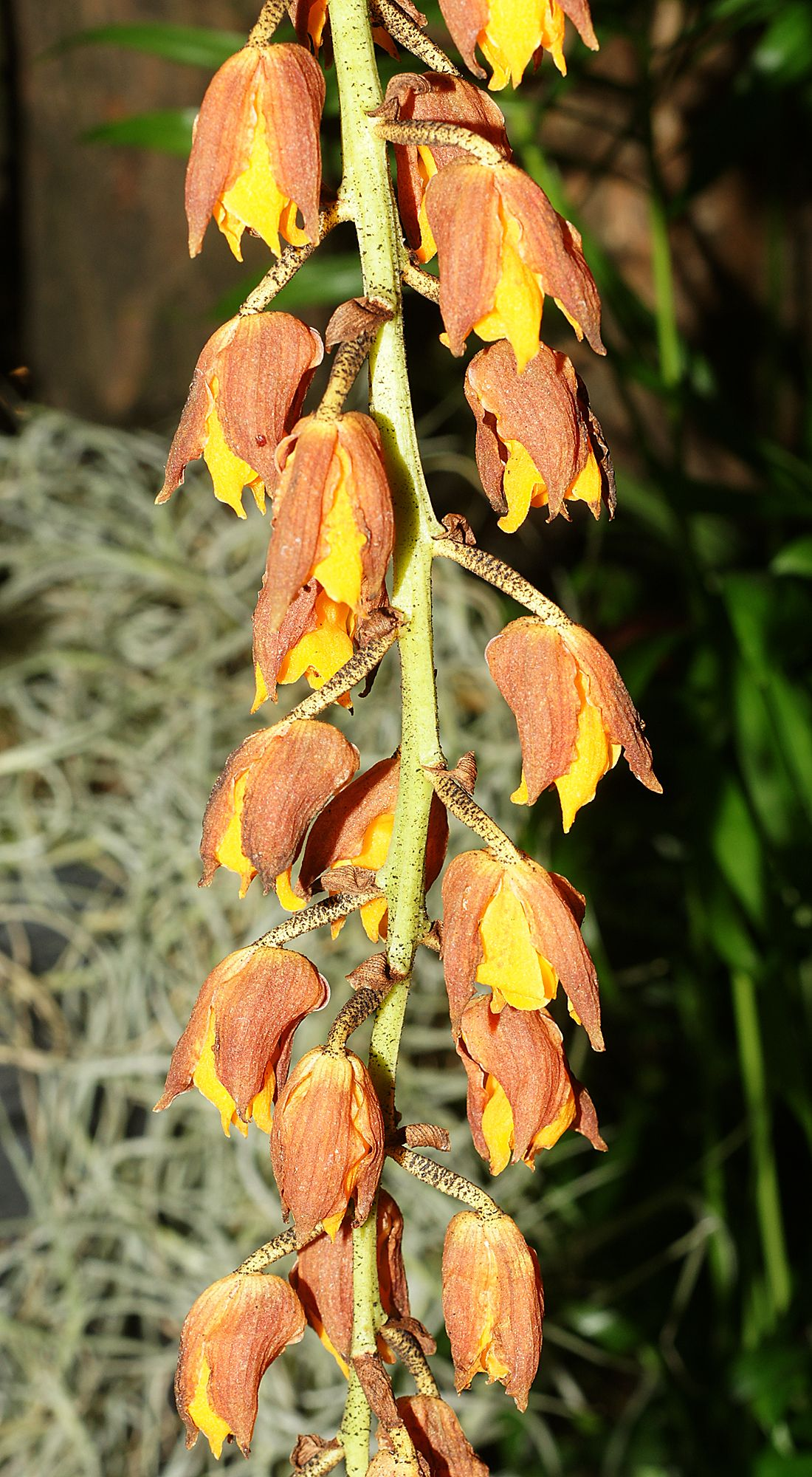
Lueddemannia

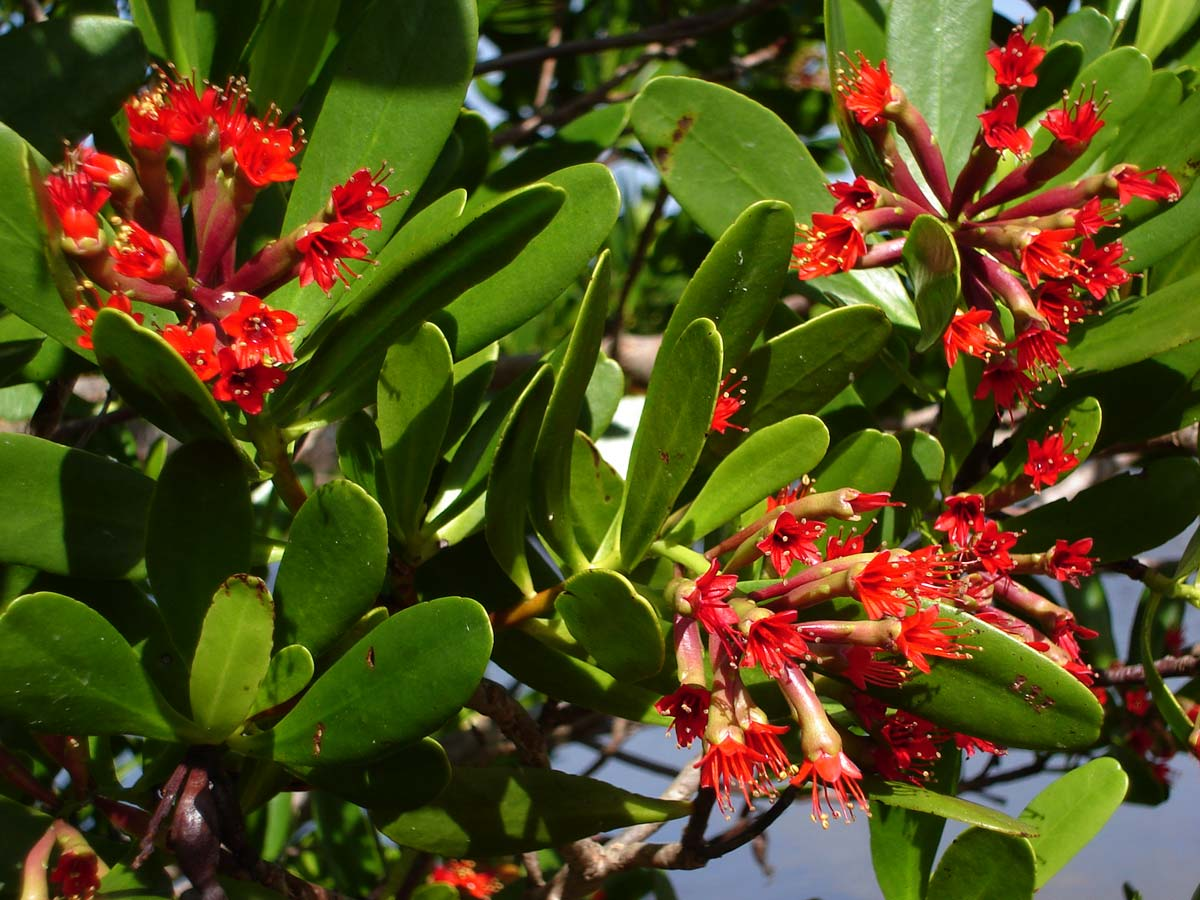
Lumnitzera

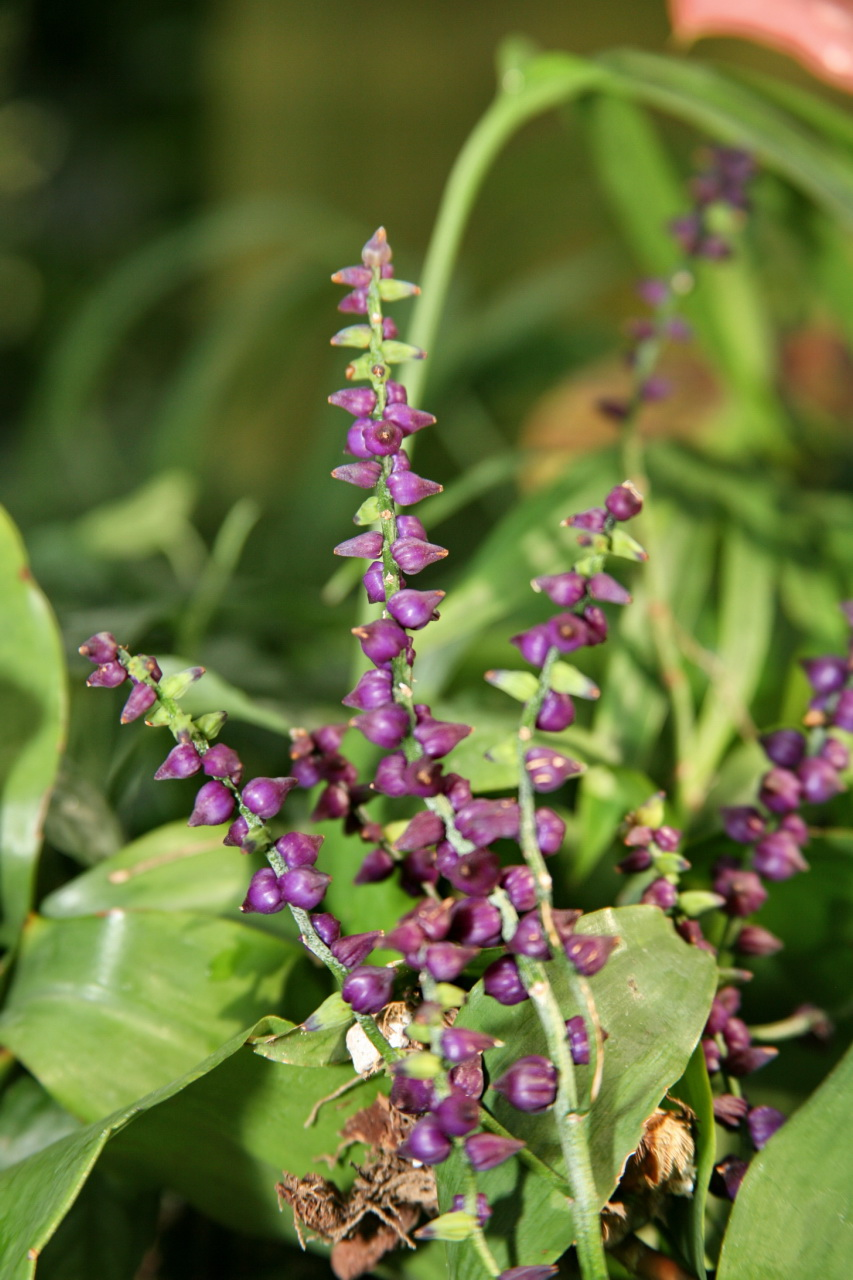
Lymania

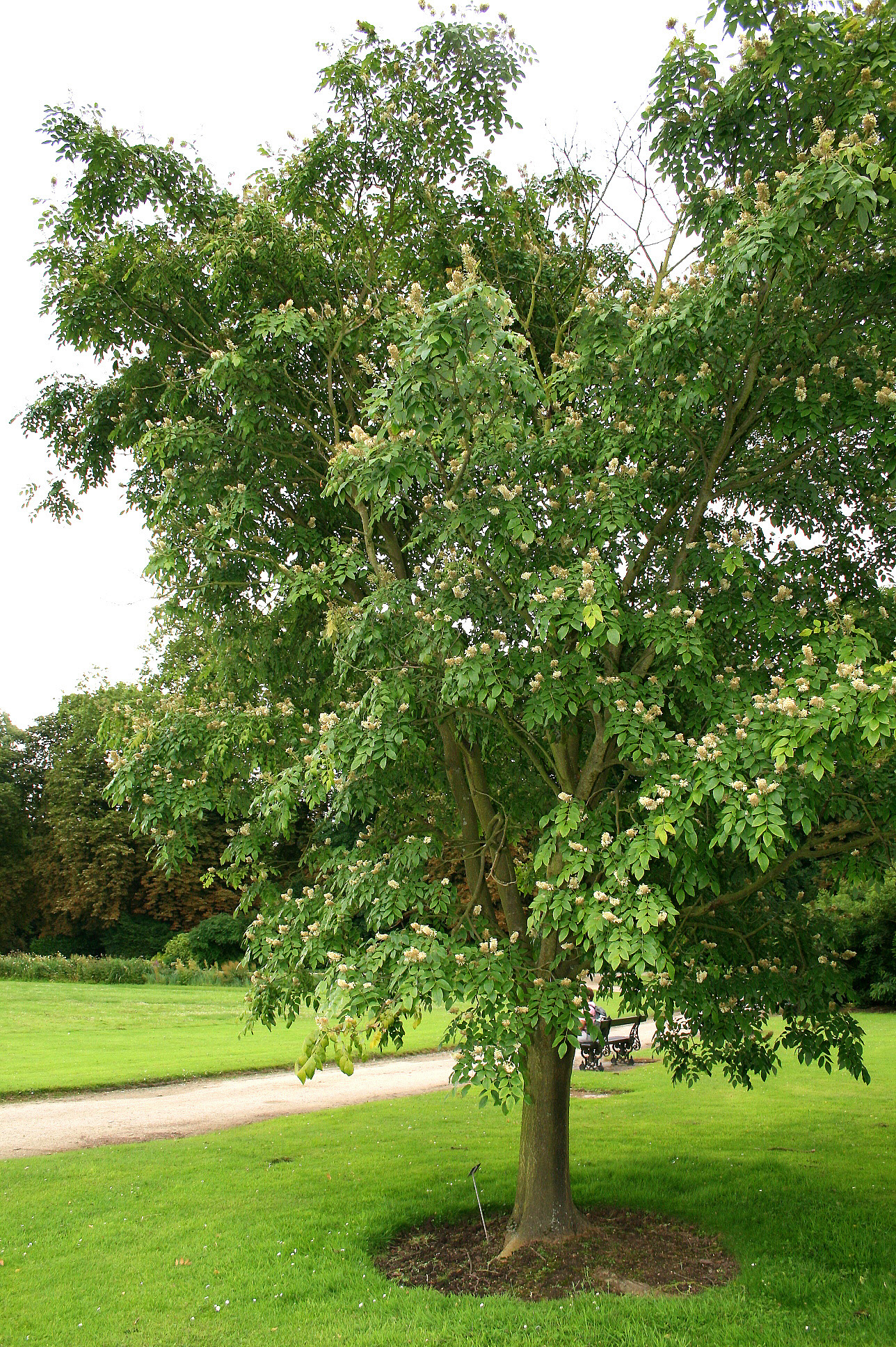
Maackia

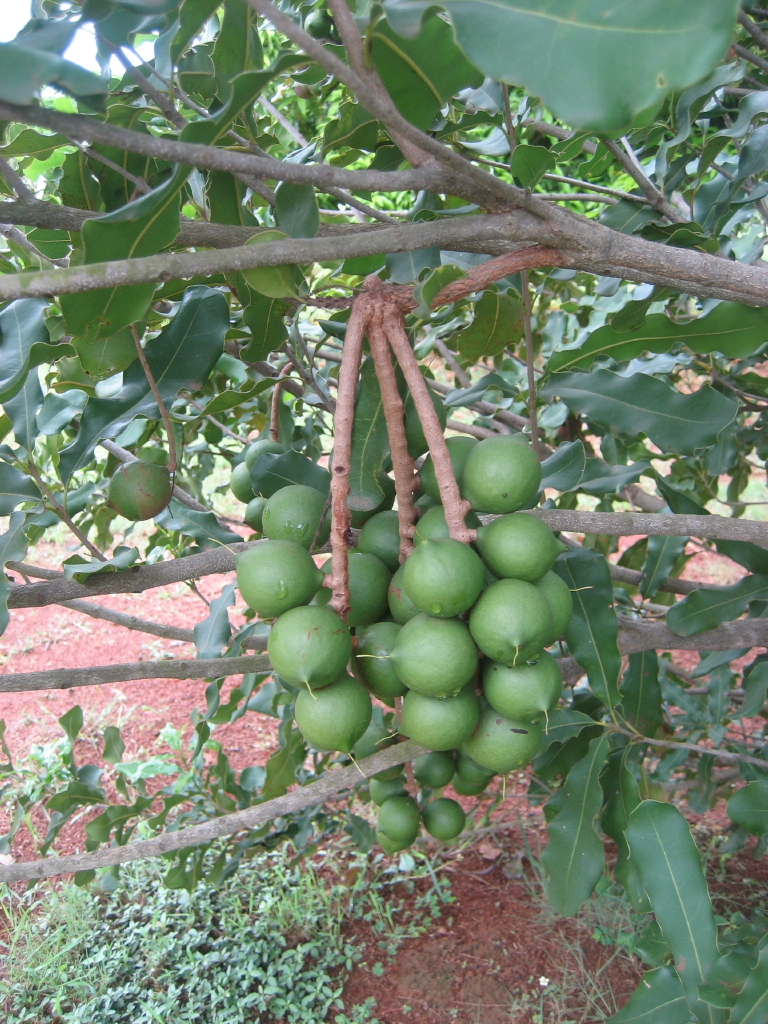
Macadamia

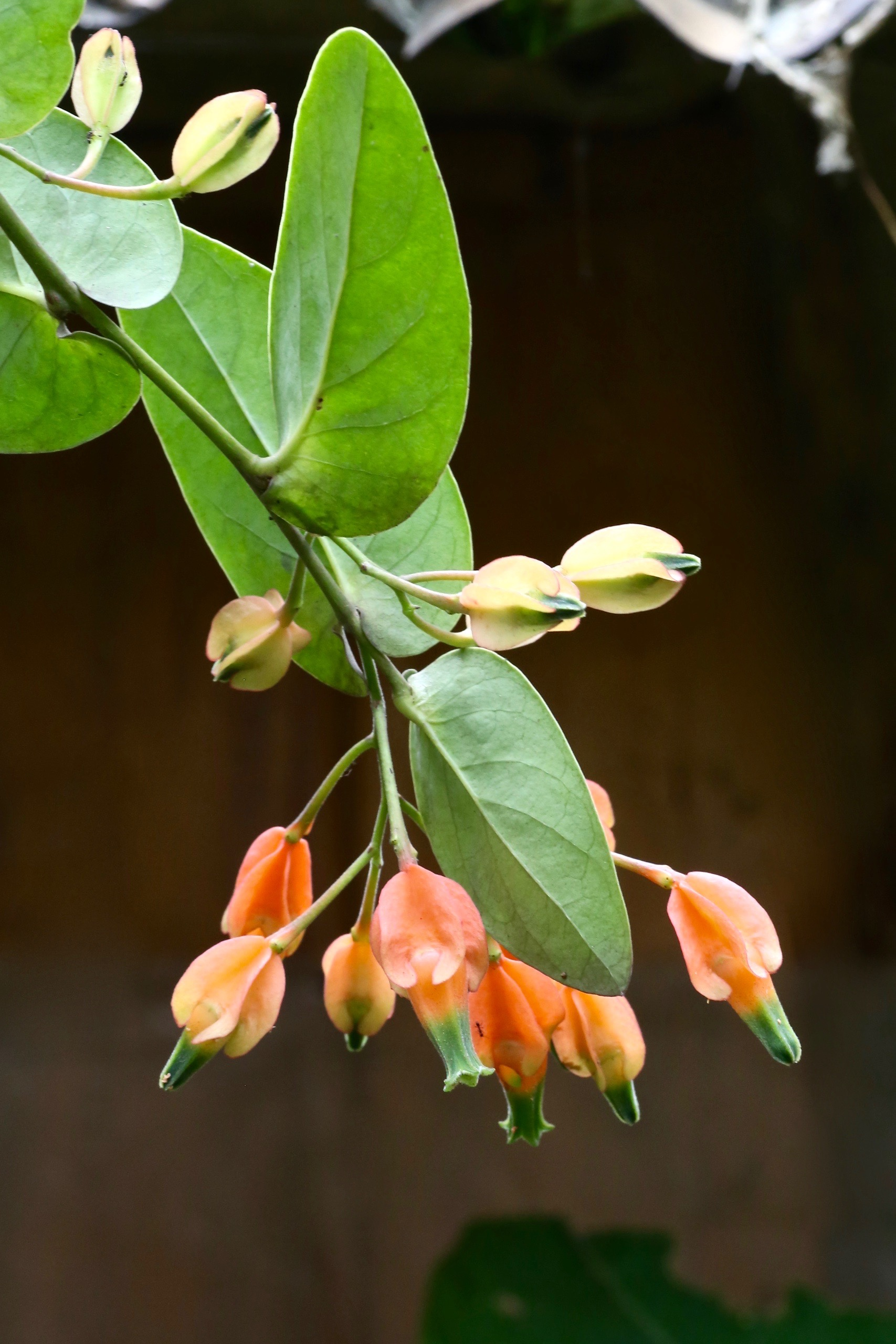
Macleania

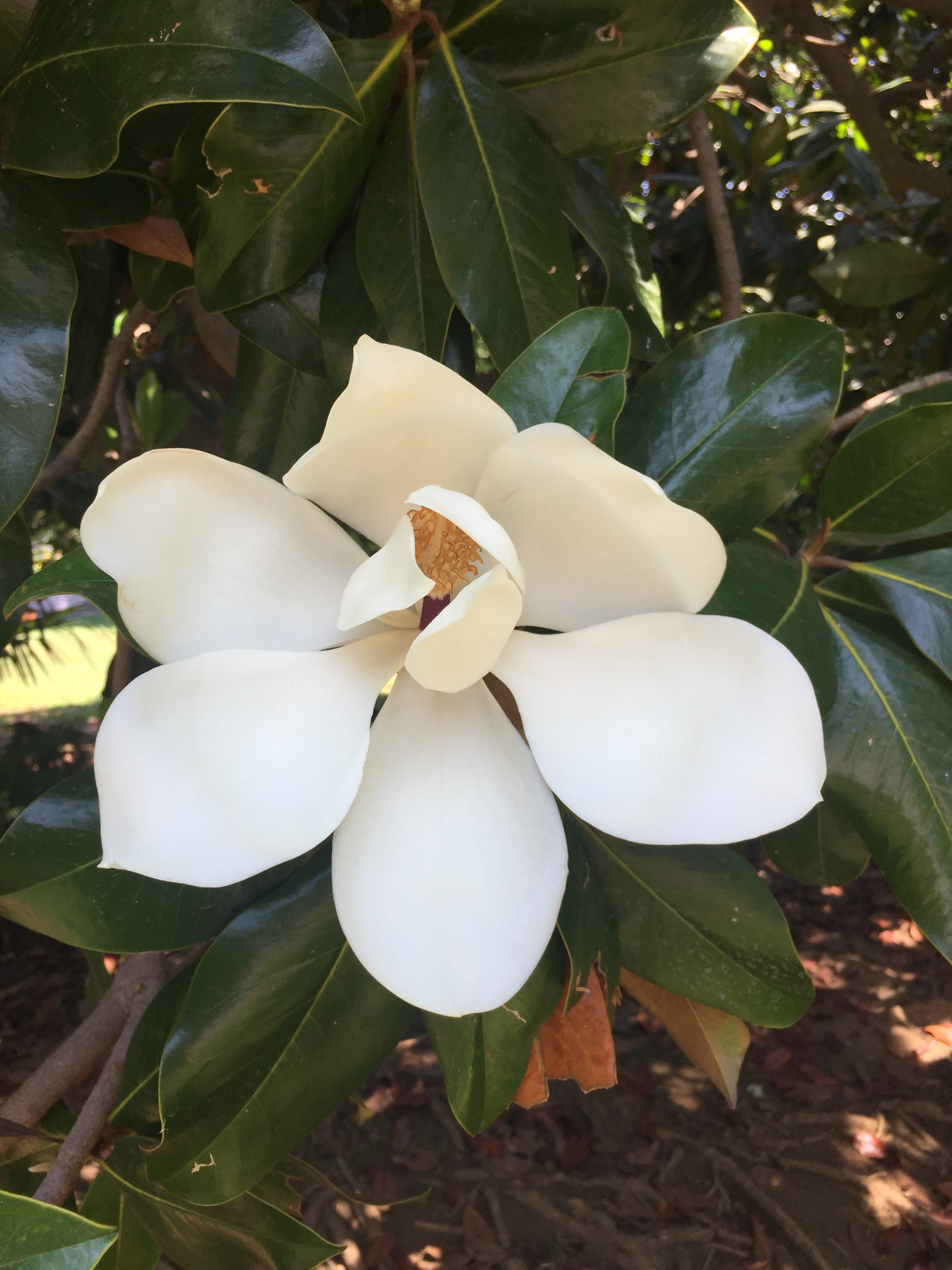
Magnolia

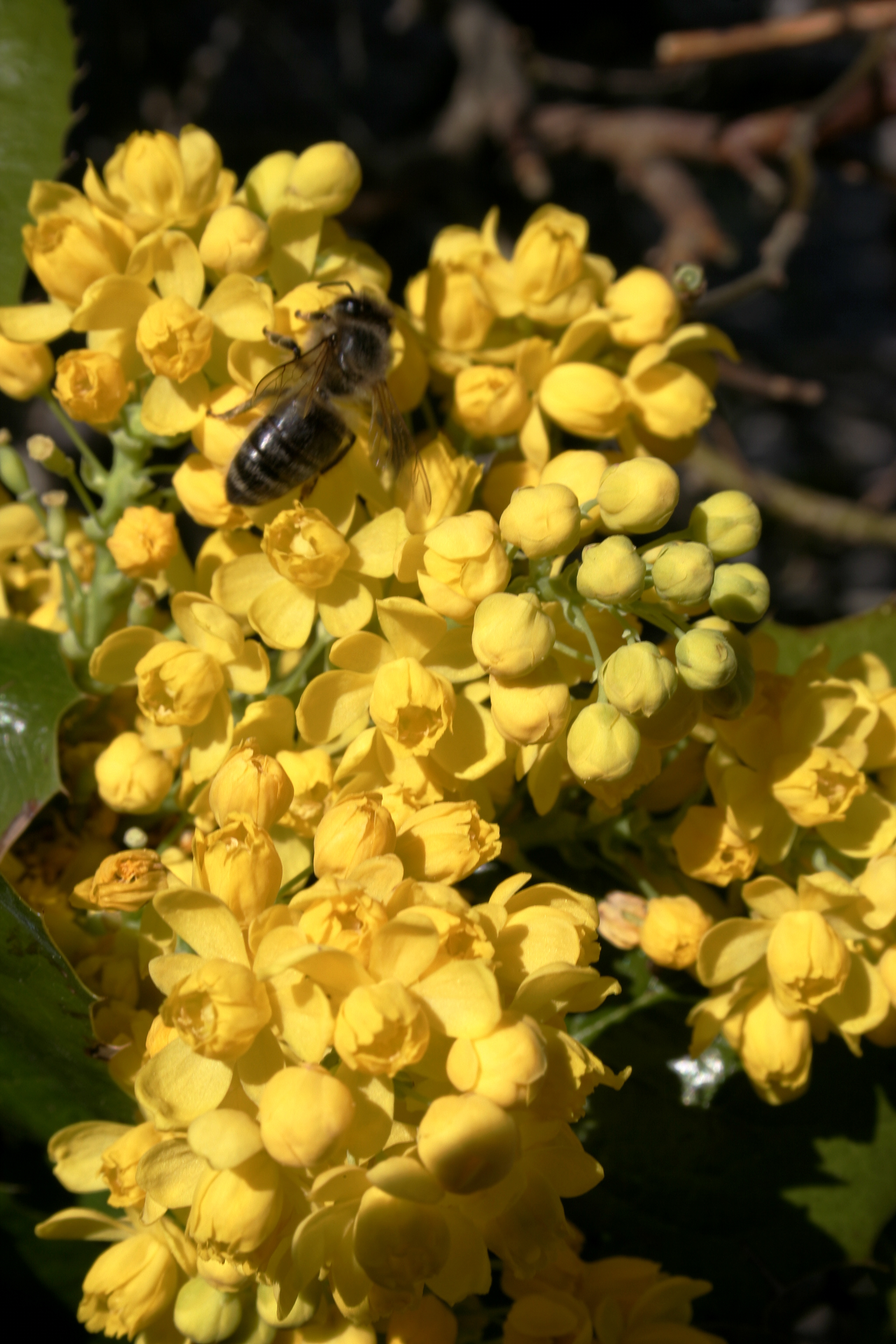
Mahonia

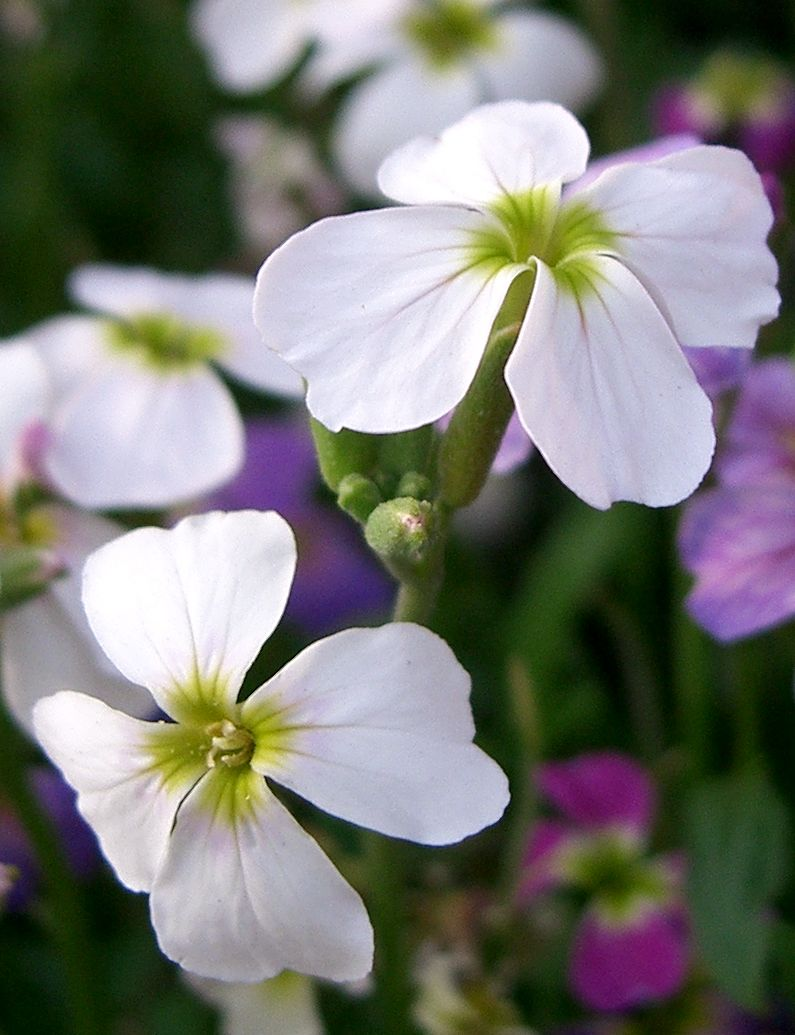
Malcolmia

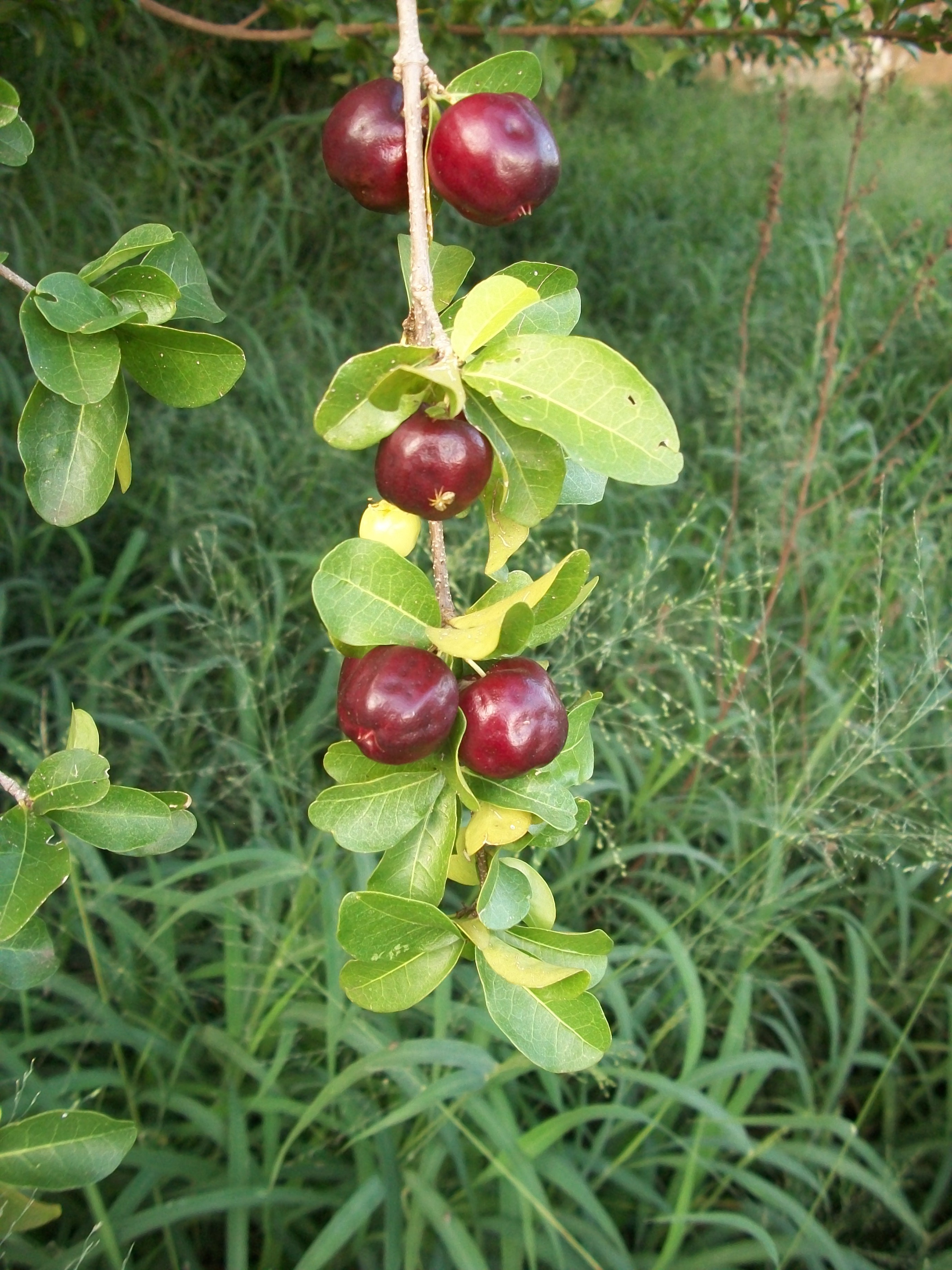
Malpighia

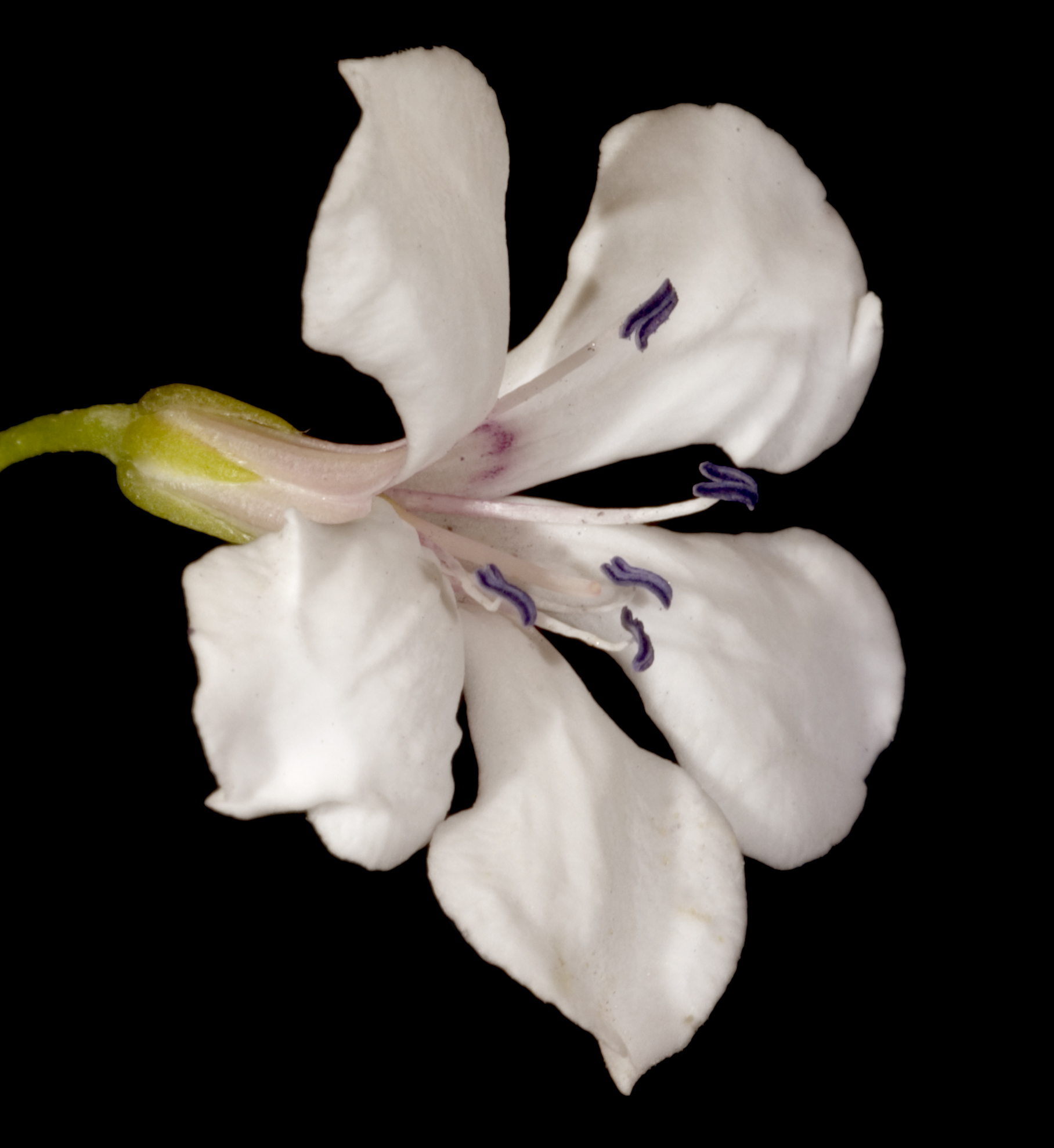
Marianthus

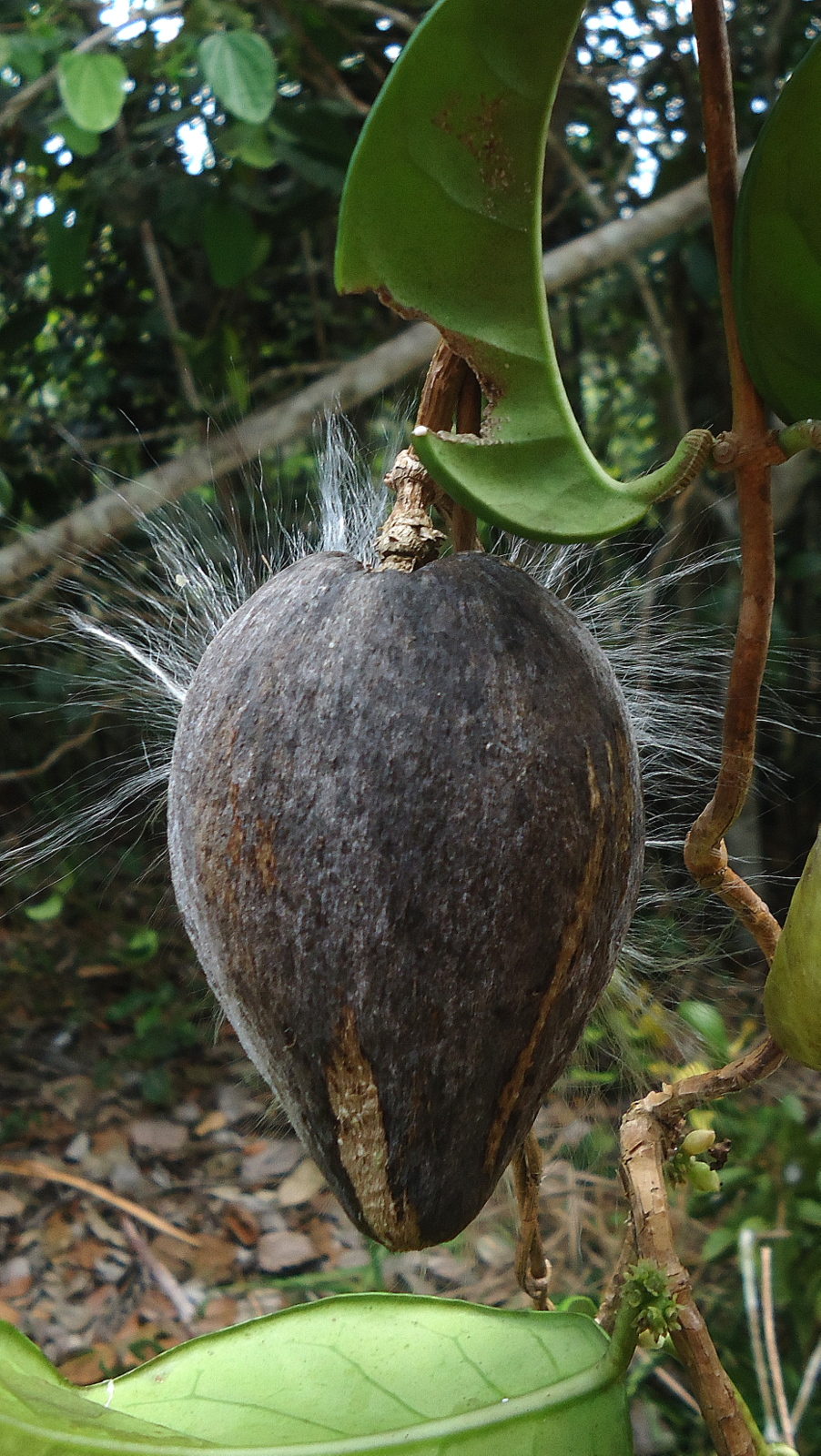
Marsdenia

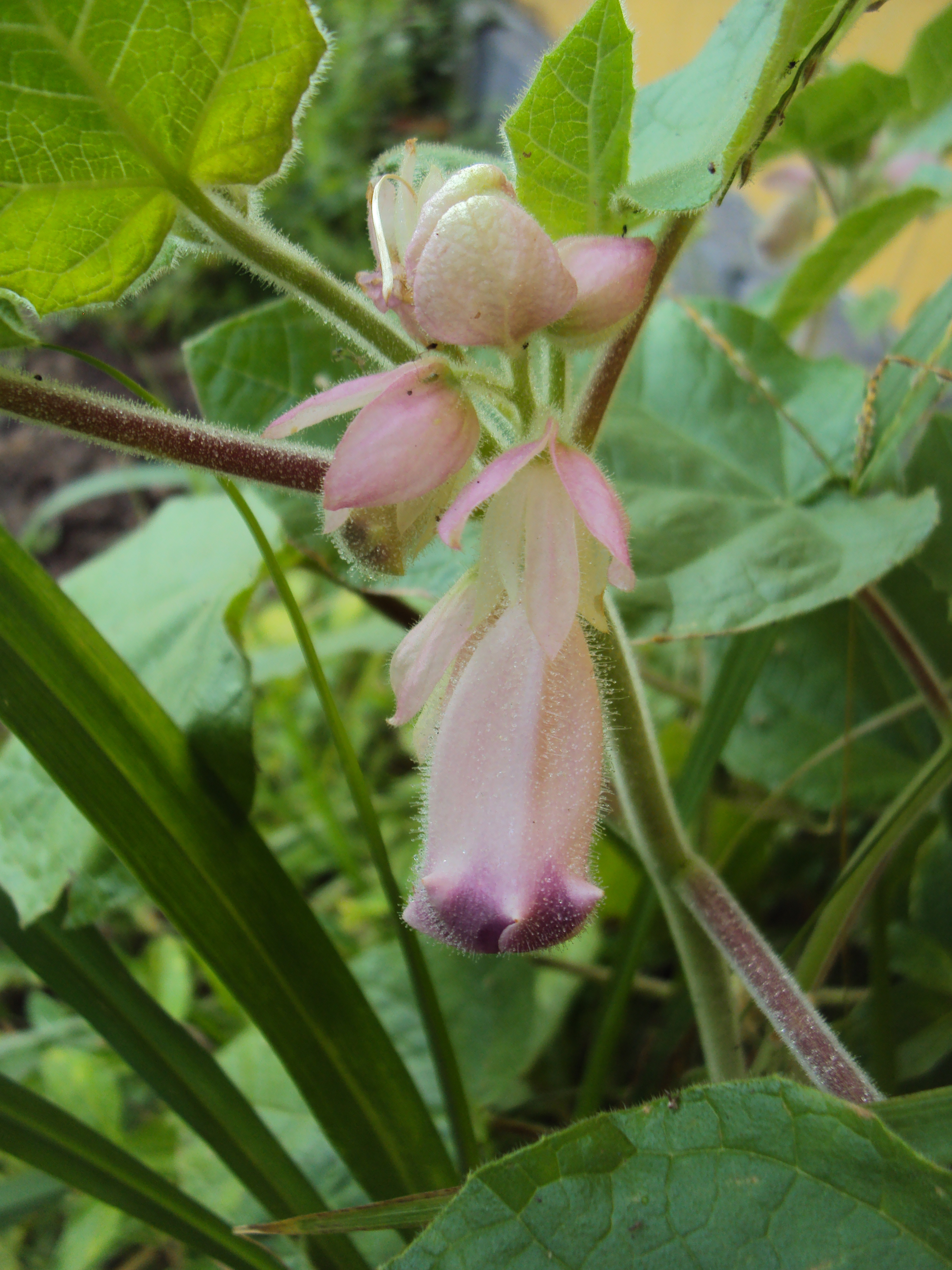
Martynia

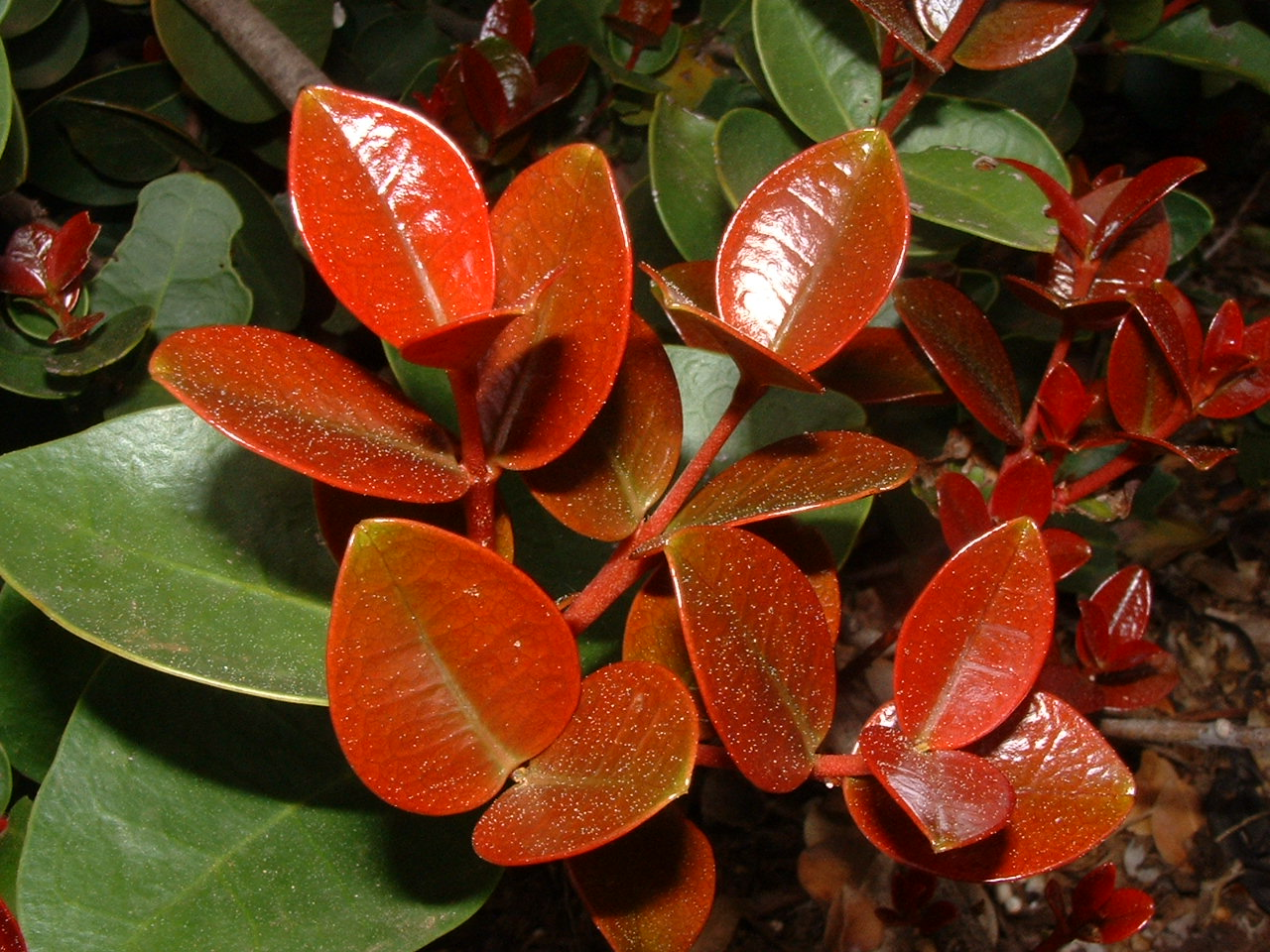
Maurocenia

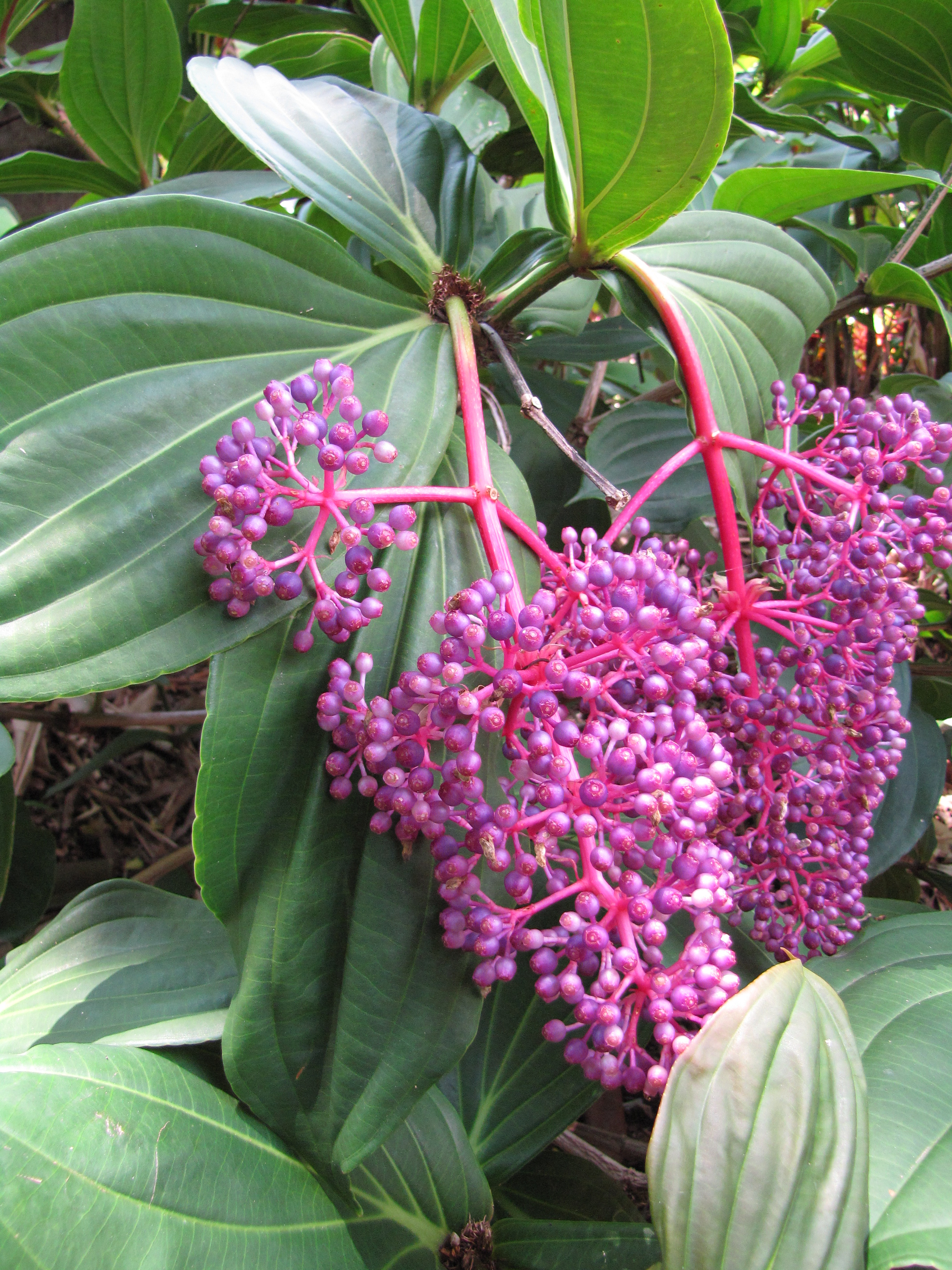
Medinilla

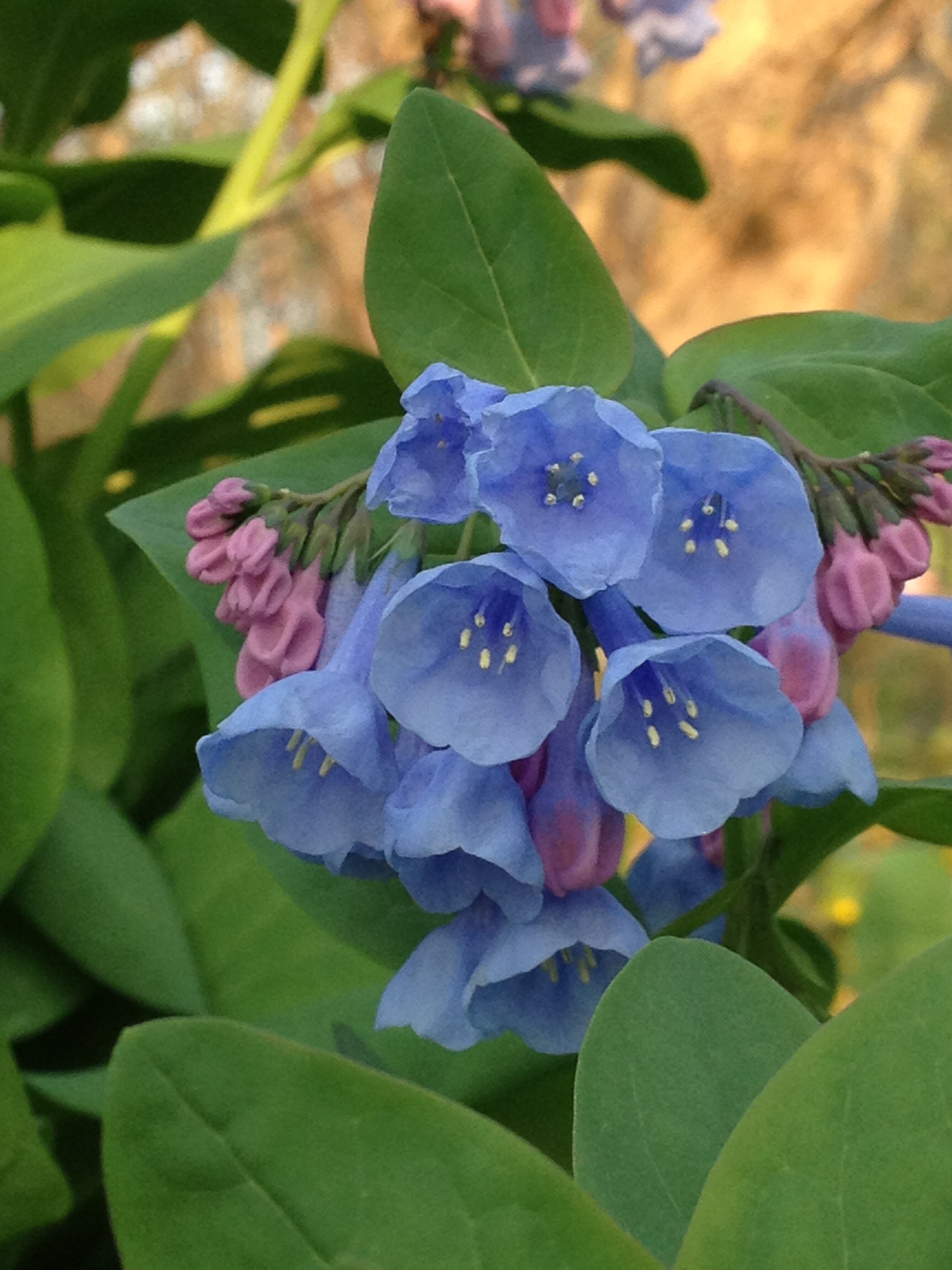
Mertensia

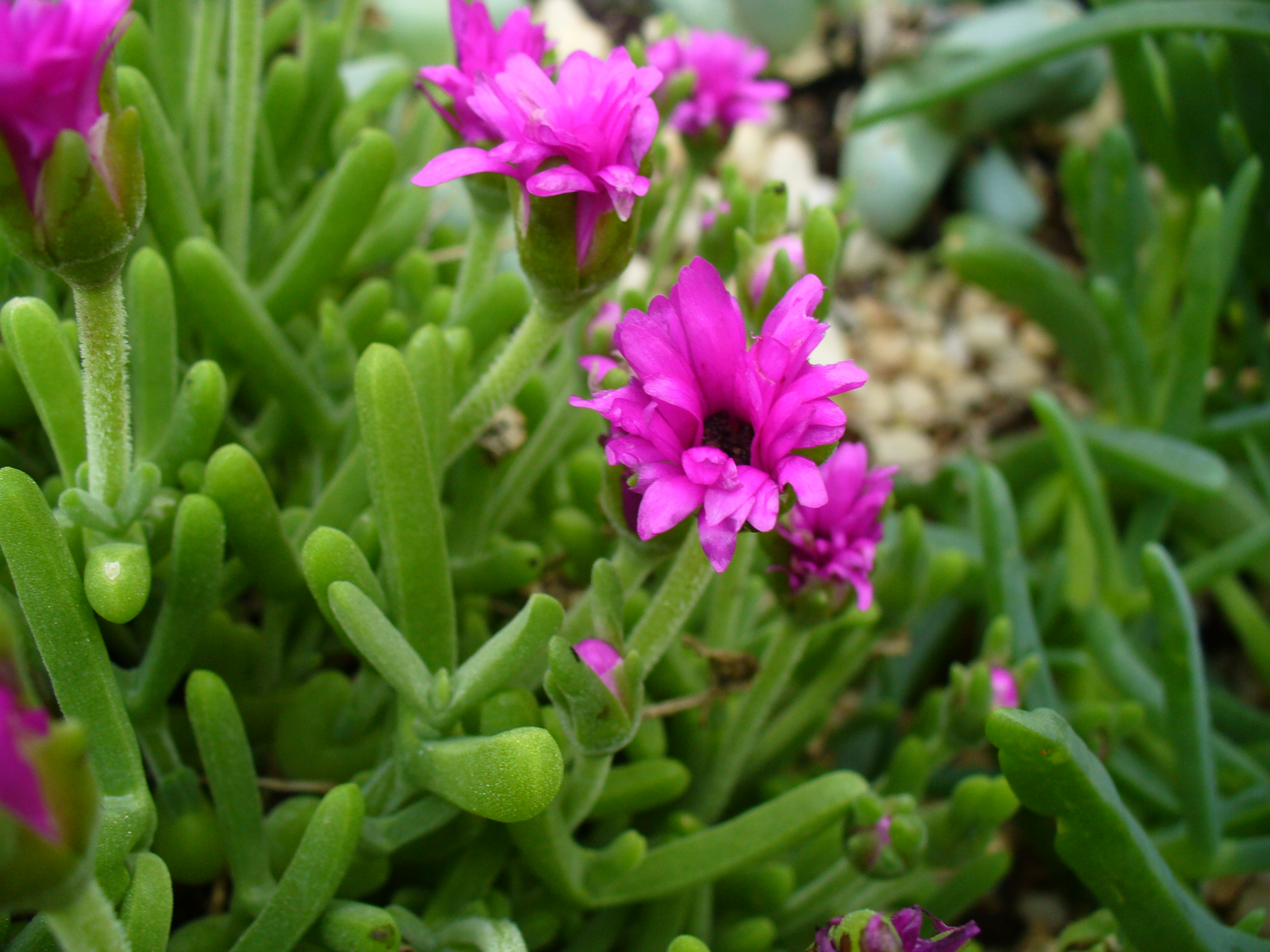
Meyerophytum

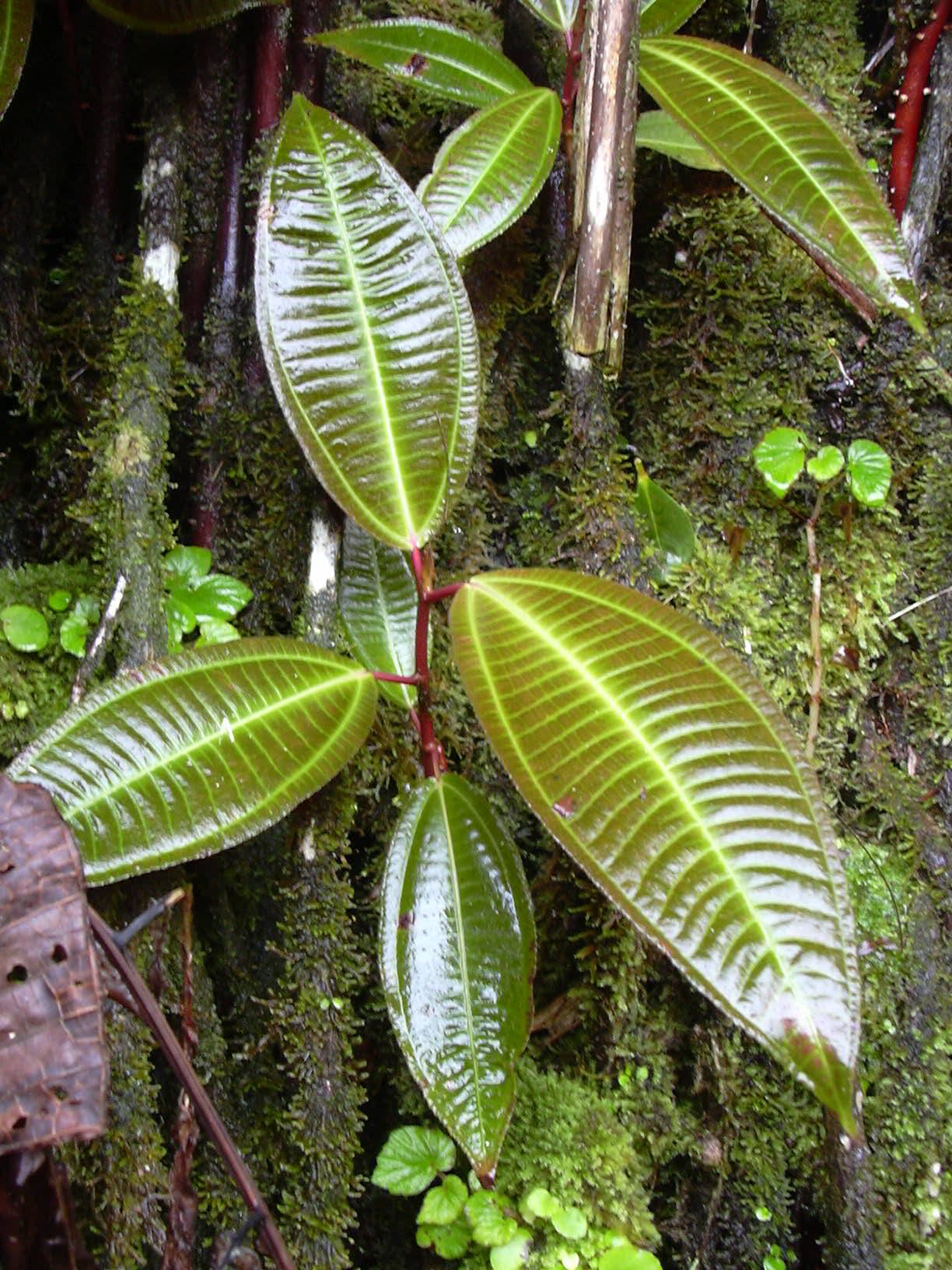
Miconia

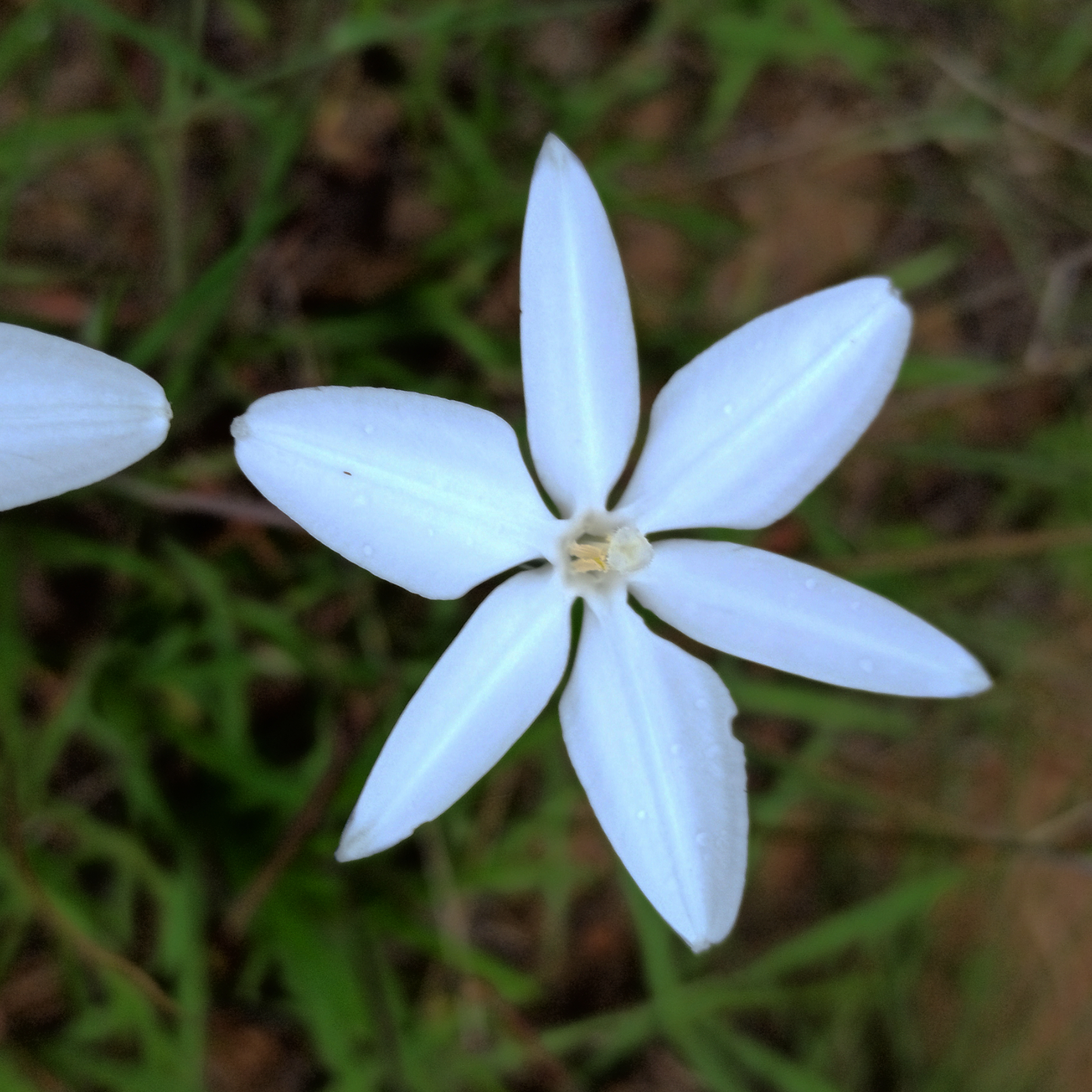
Milla

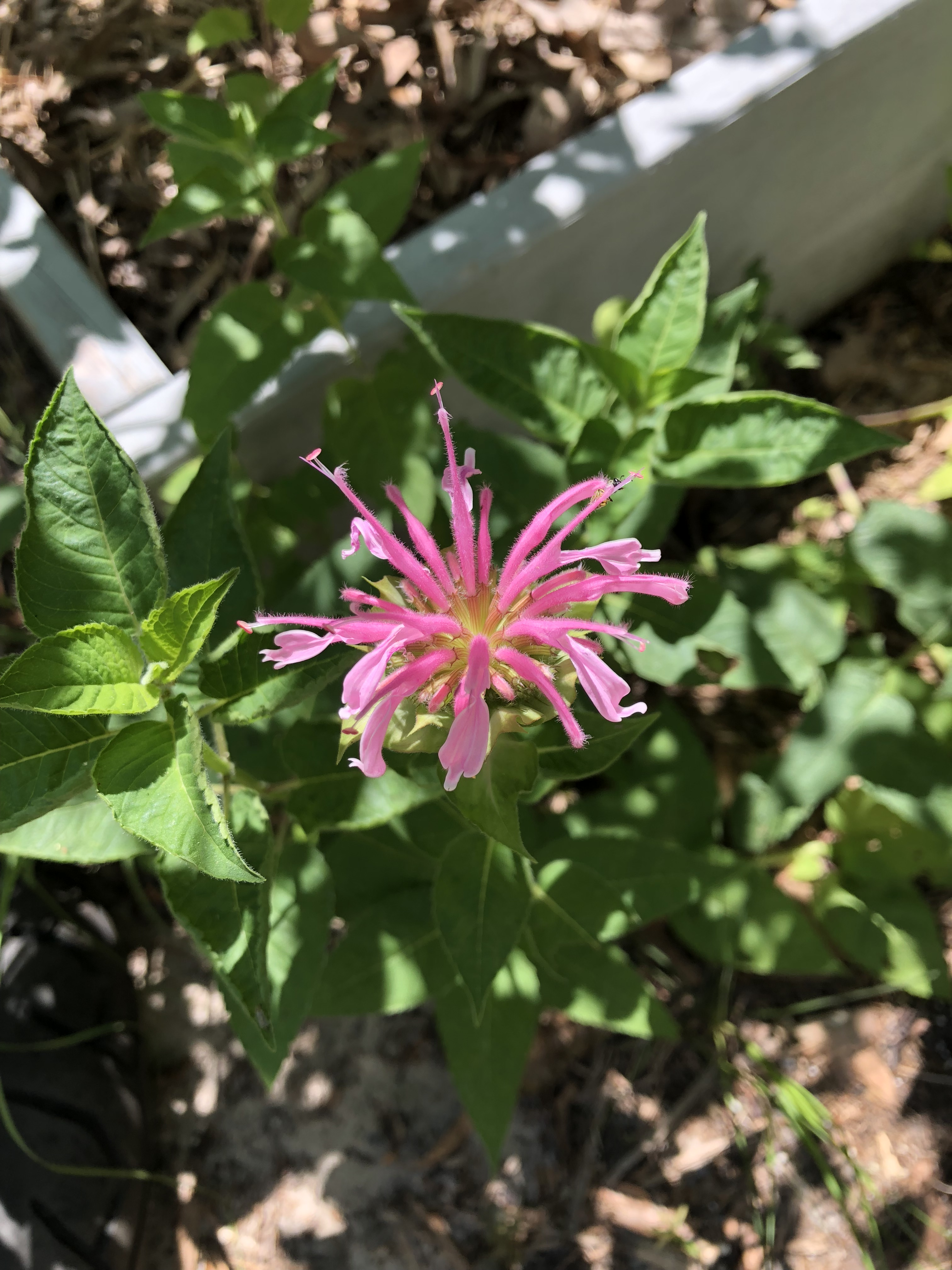
Monarda

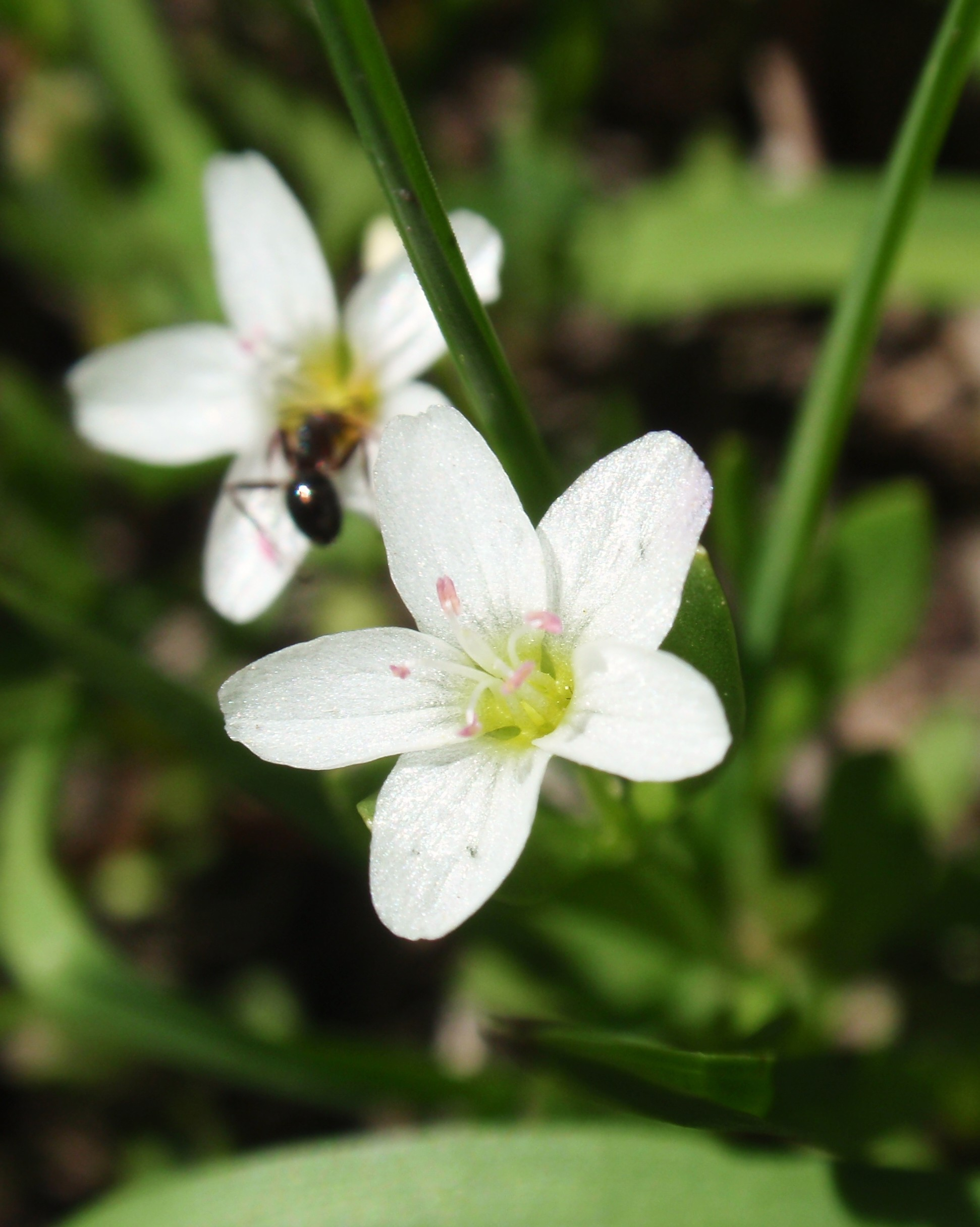
Montia

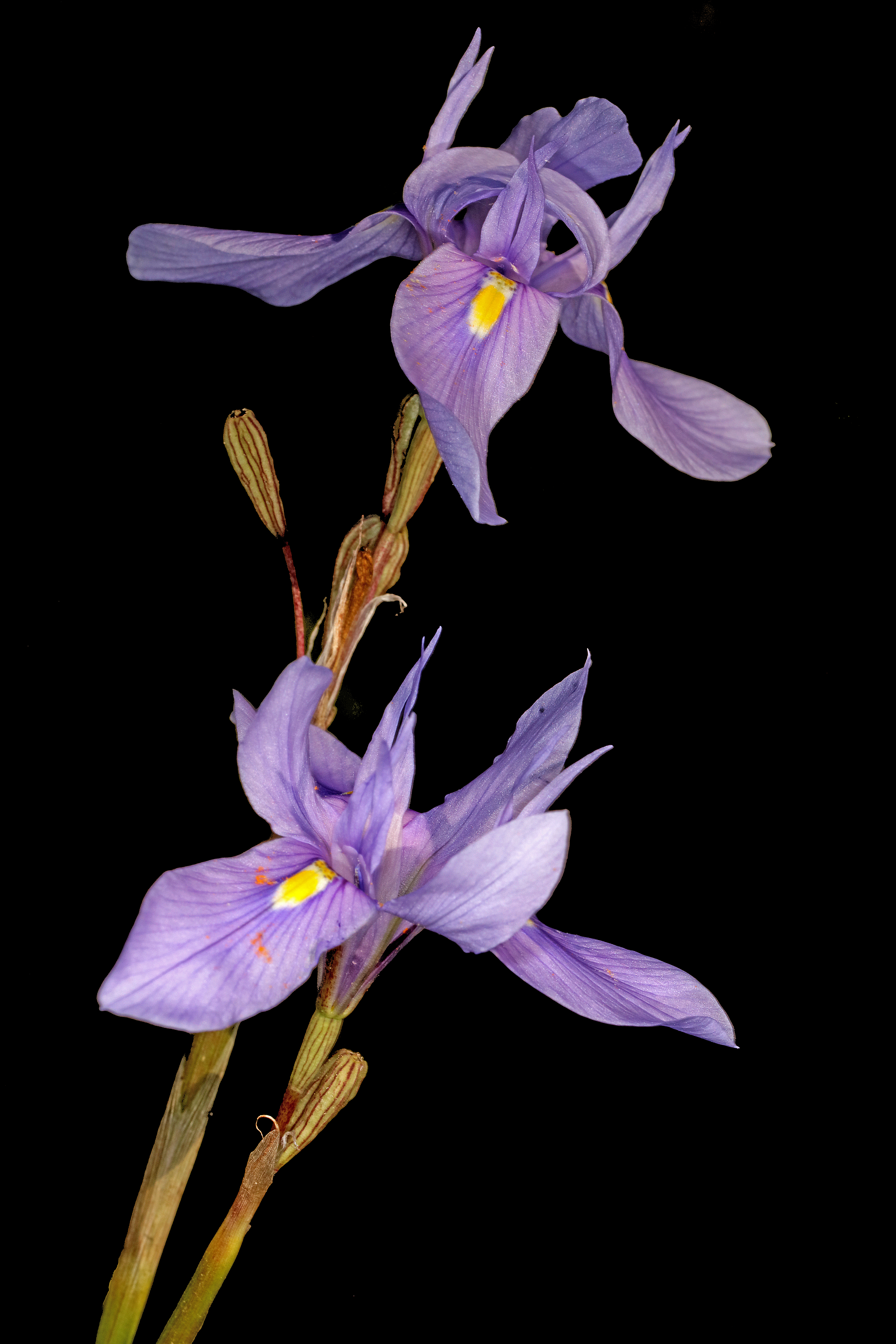
Moraea

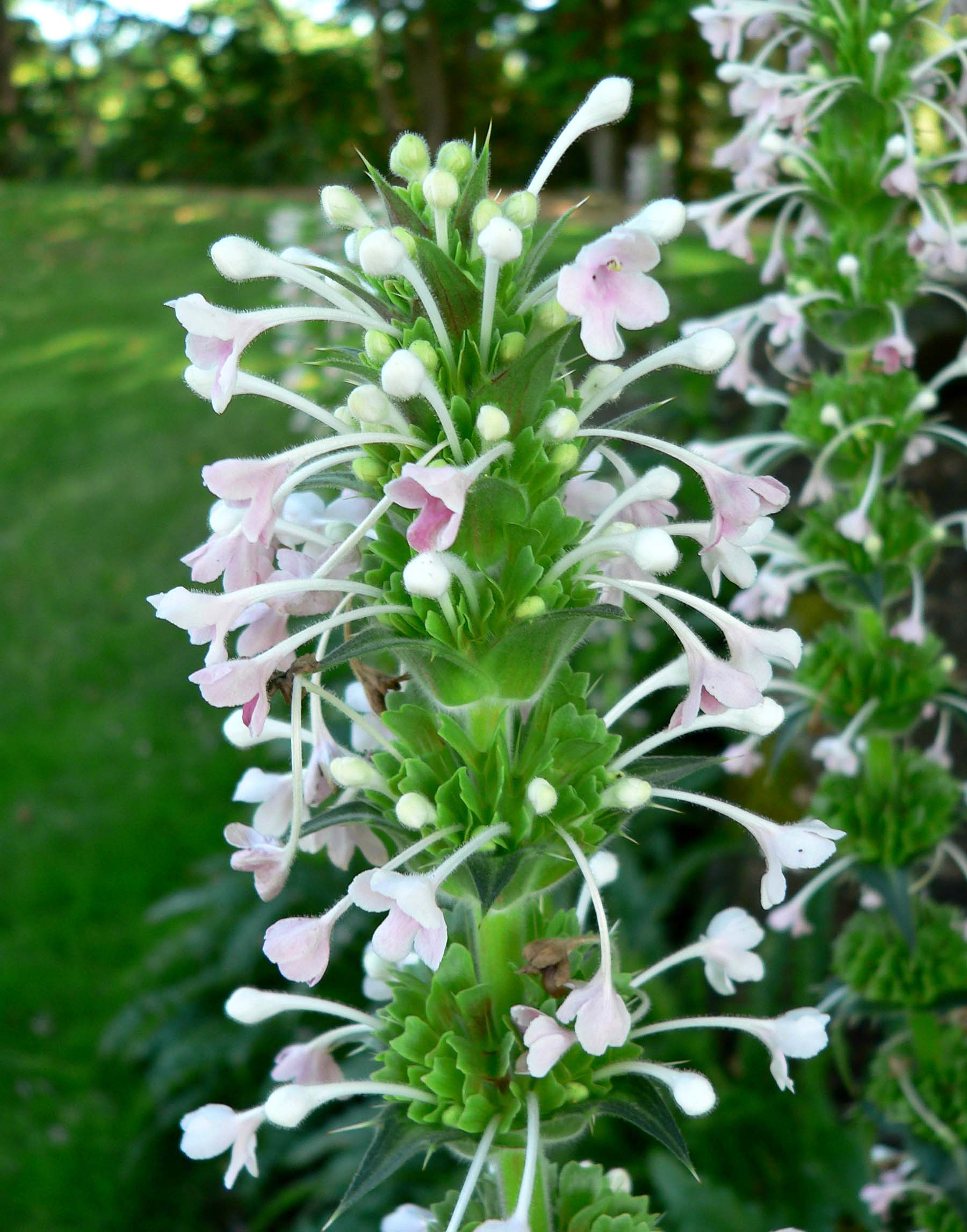
Morina

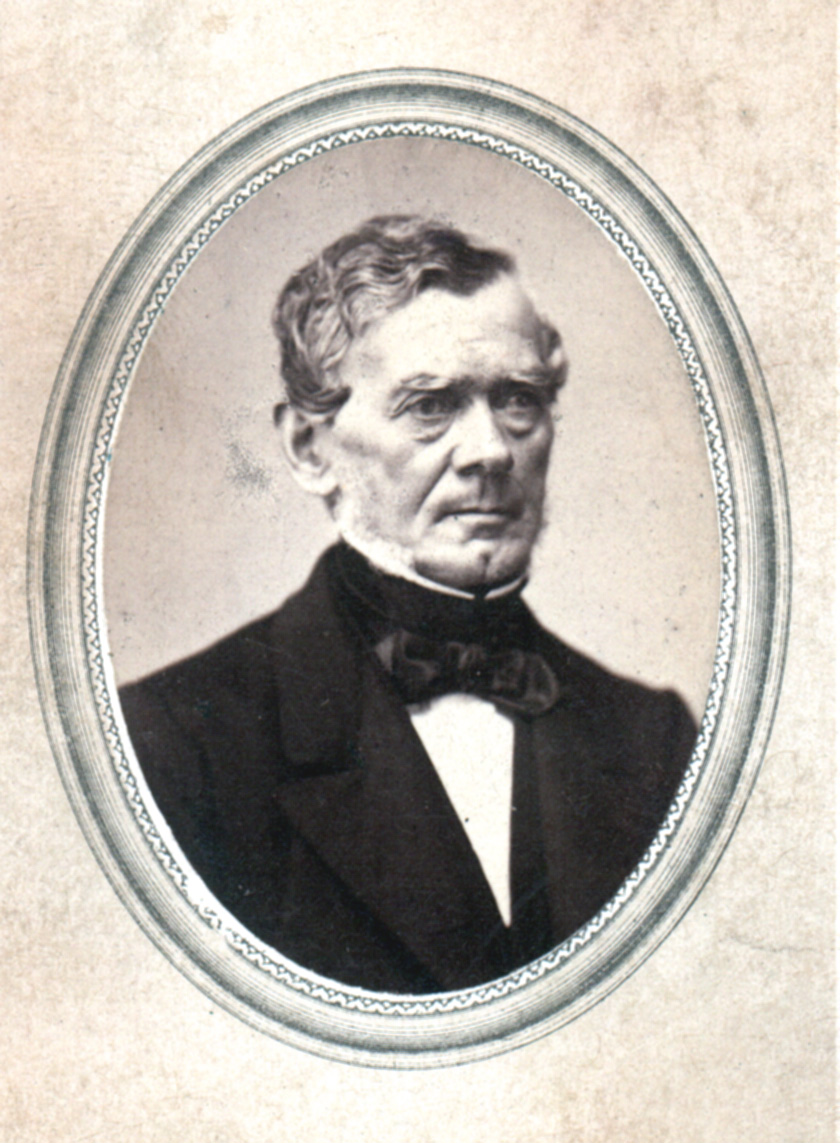
Albert Mousson

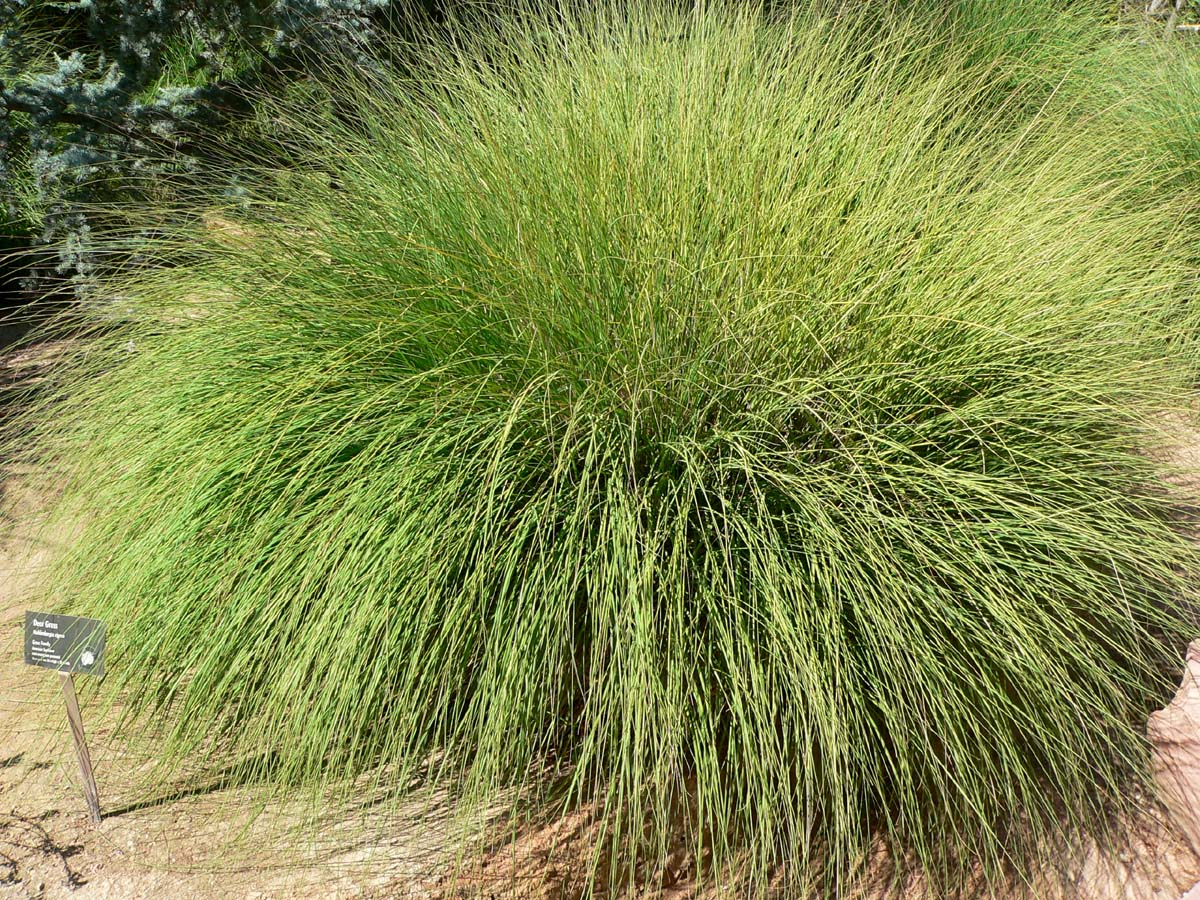
Muhlenbergia

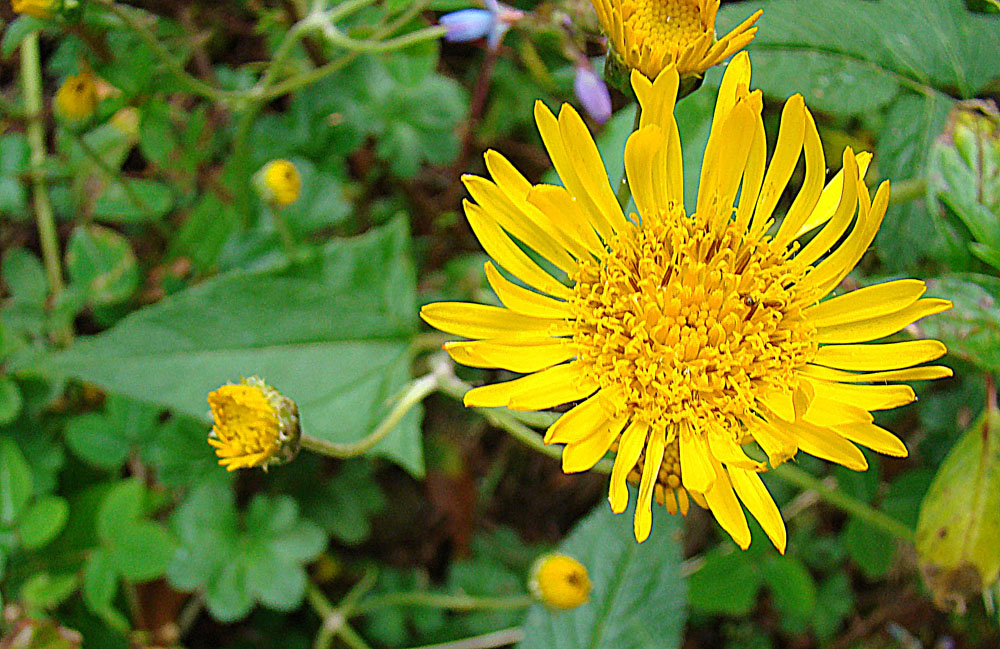
Munnozia

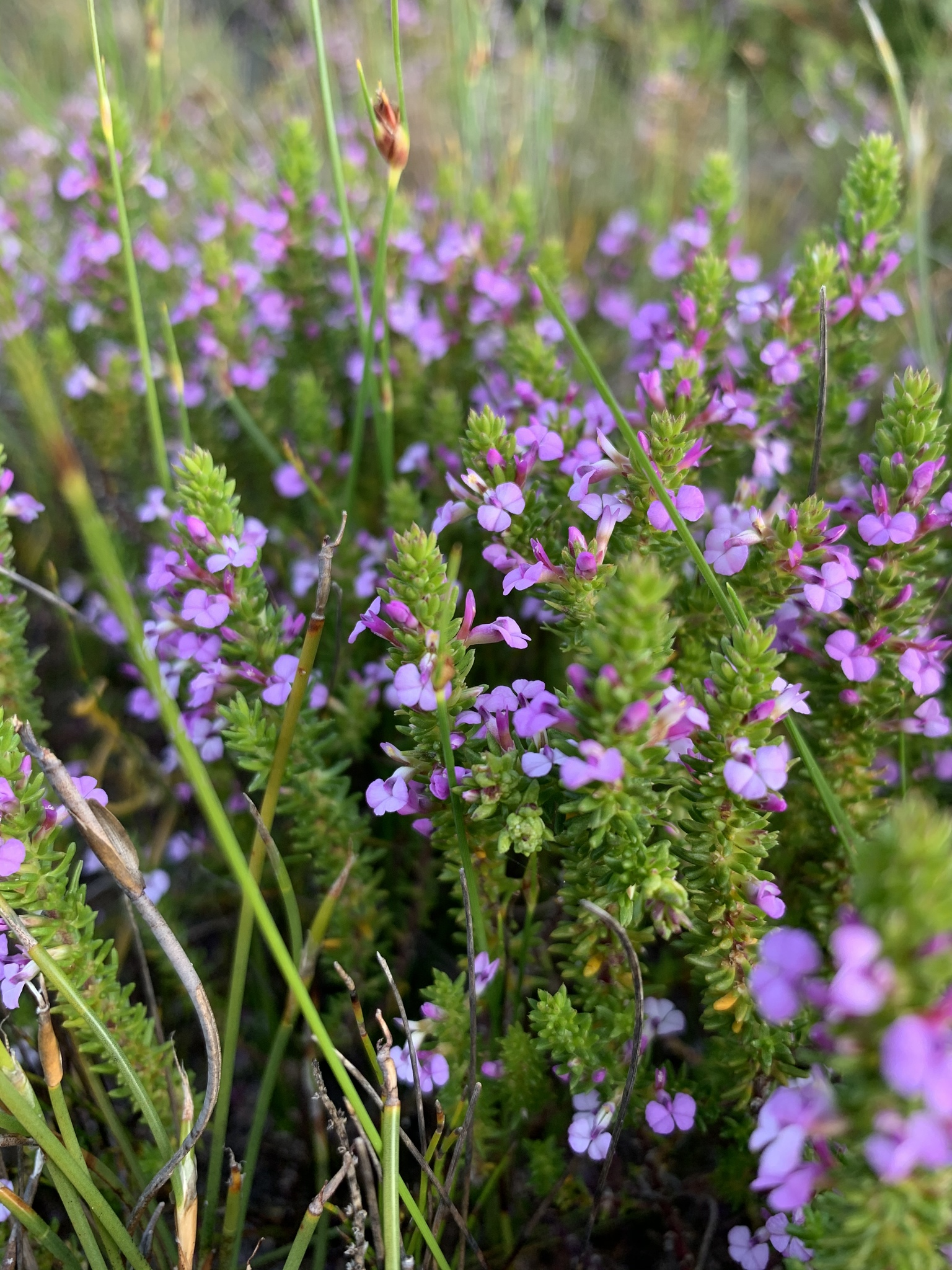
Muraltia

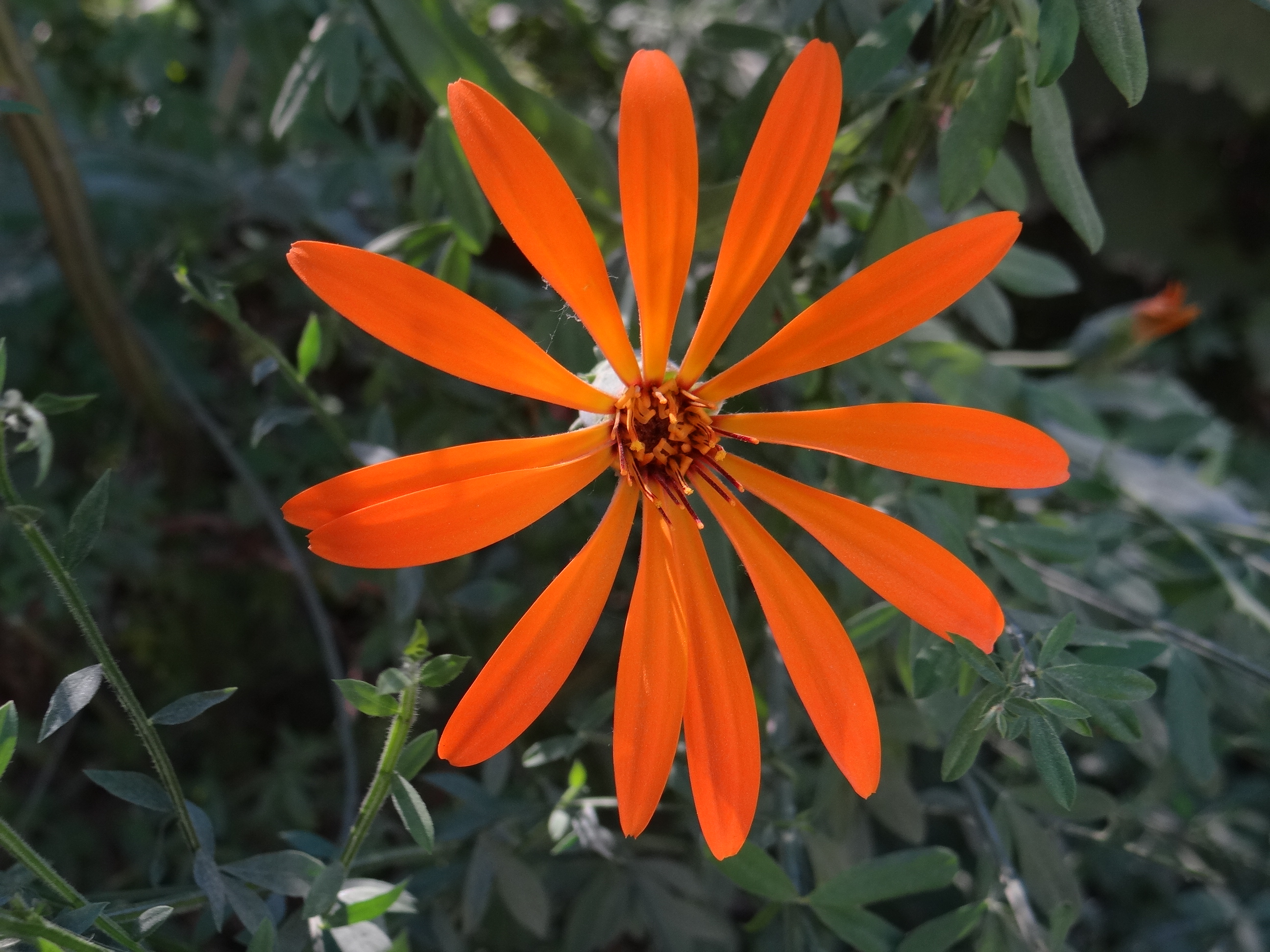
Mutisia

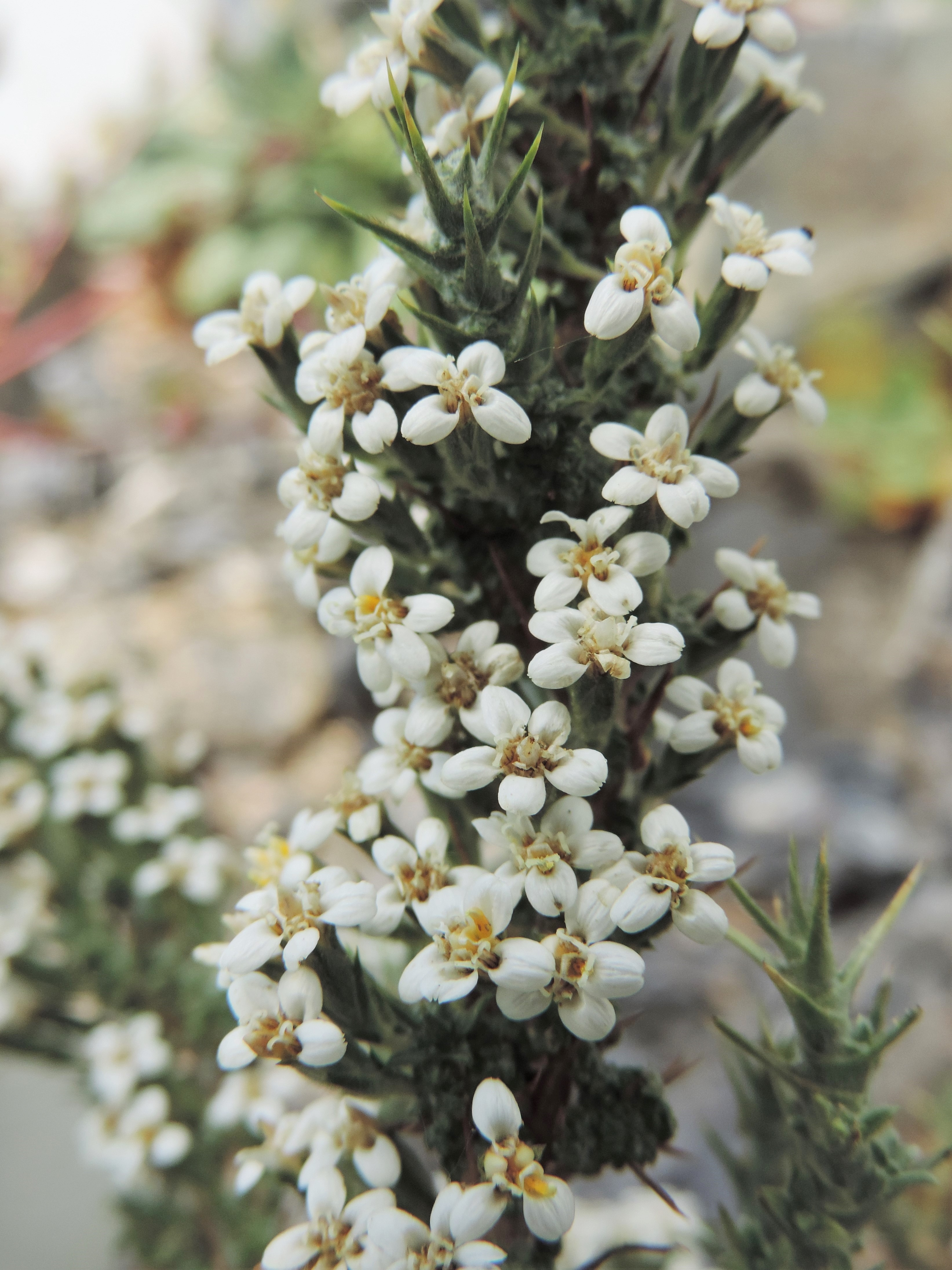
Nassauvia

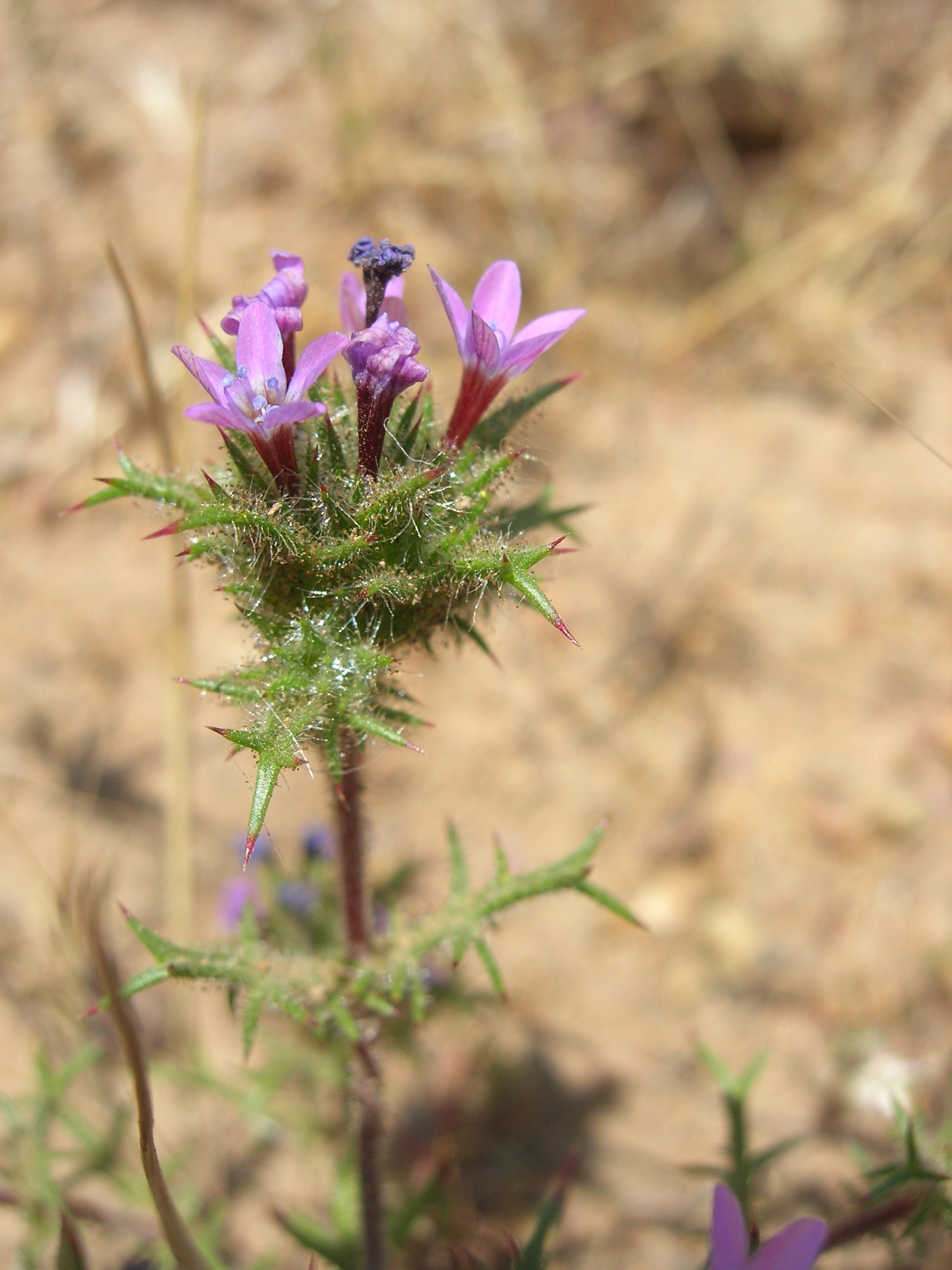
Navarretia

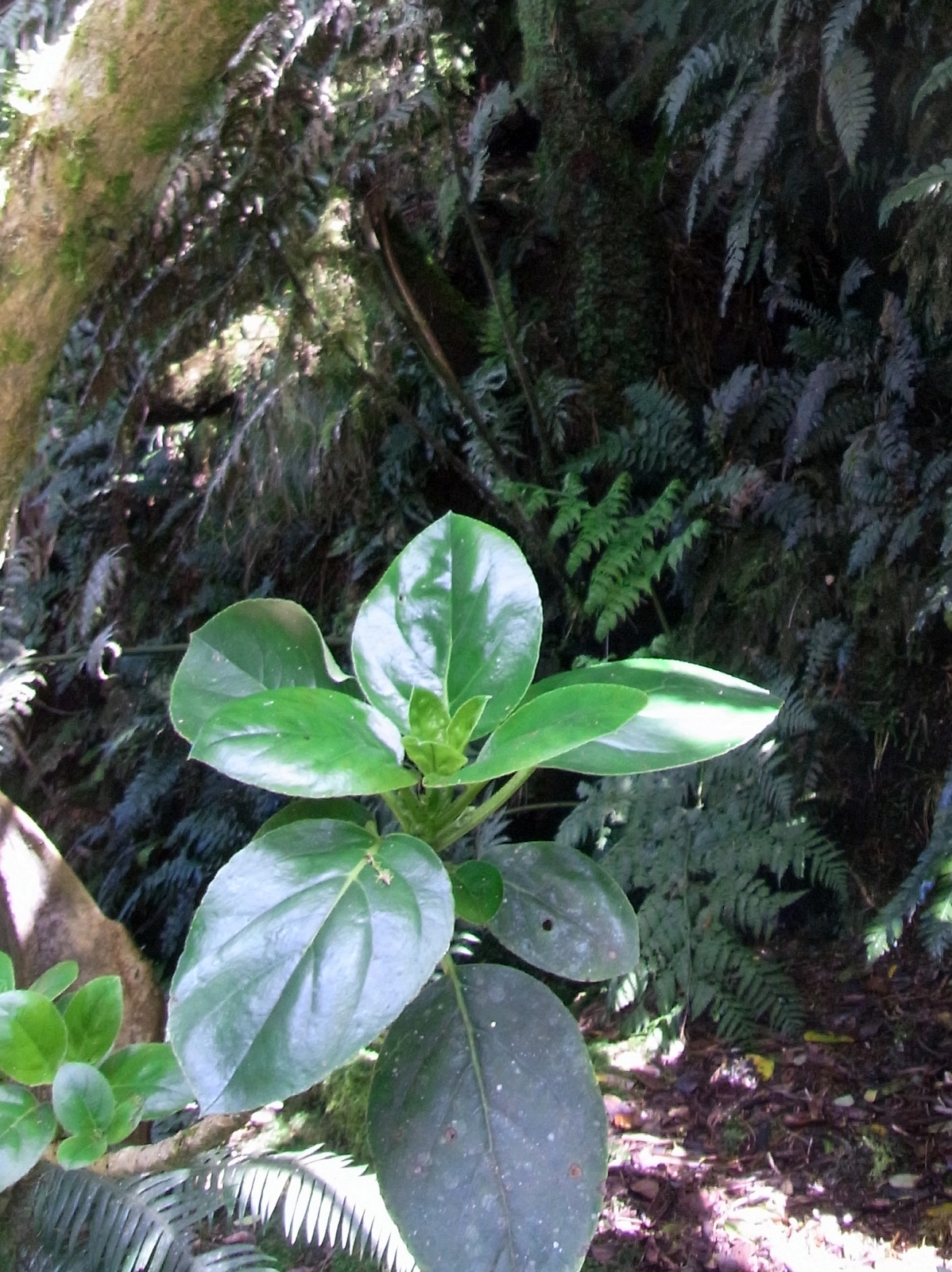
Negria

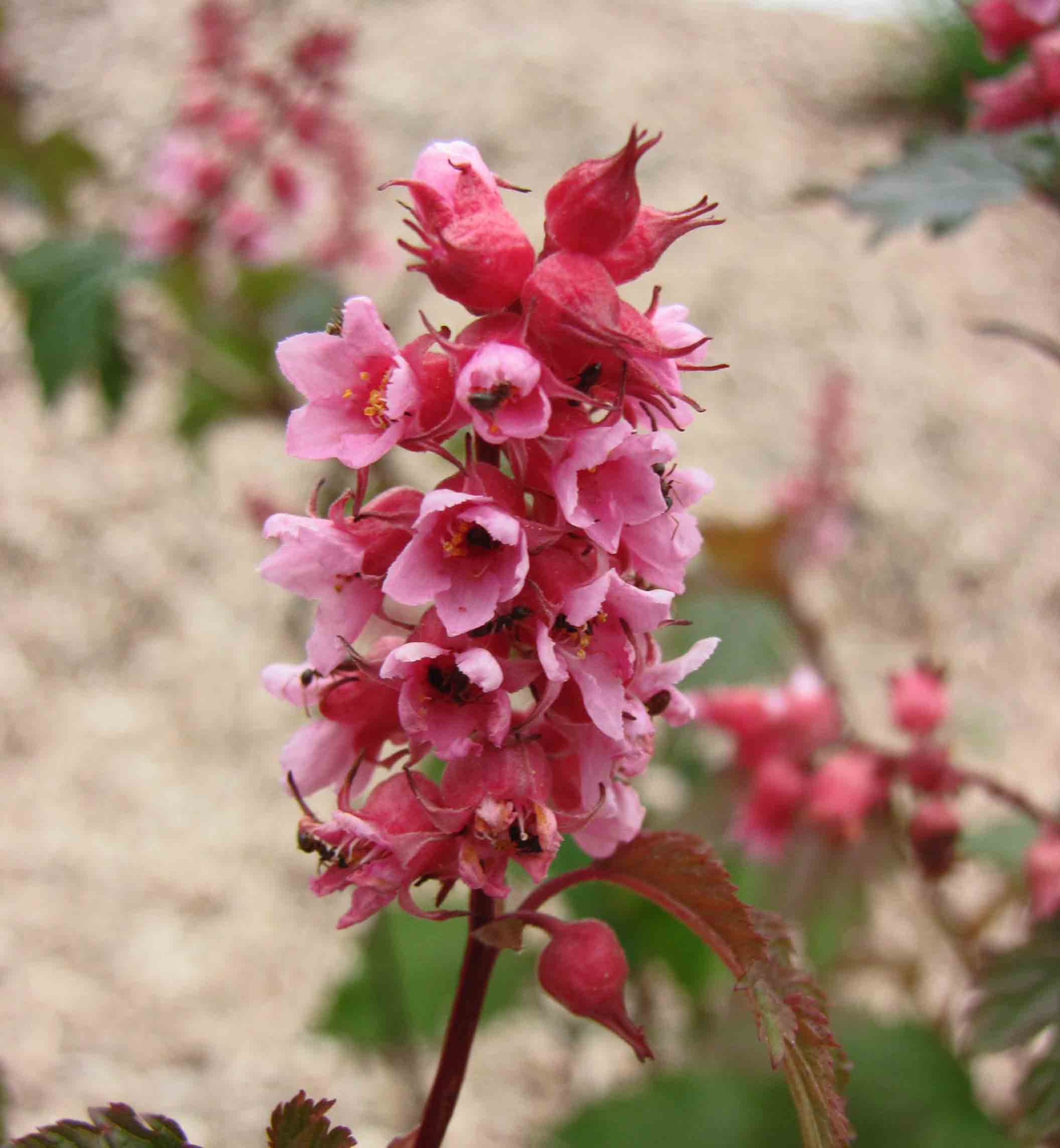
Neillia

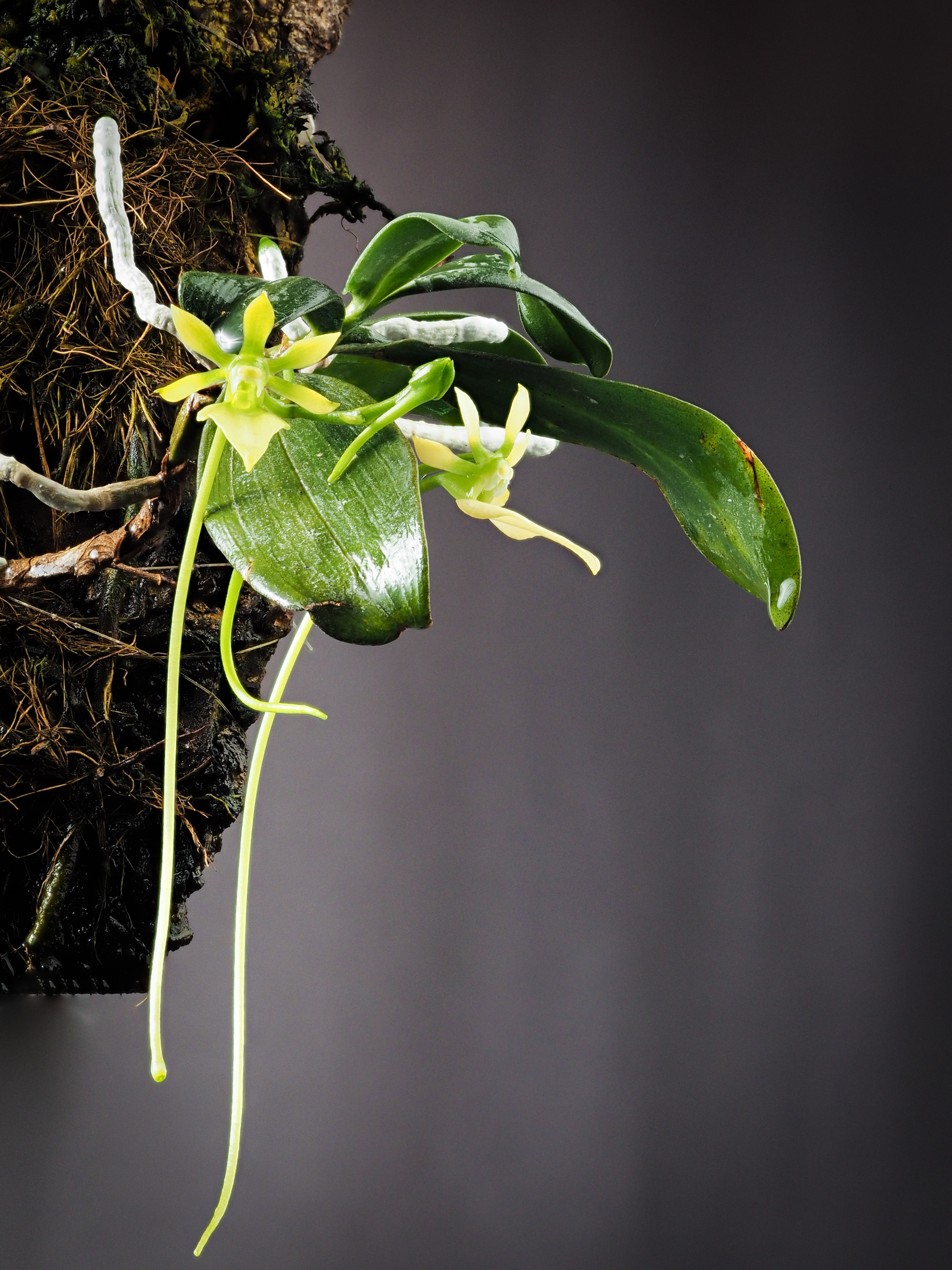
Neobathiea

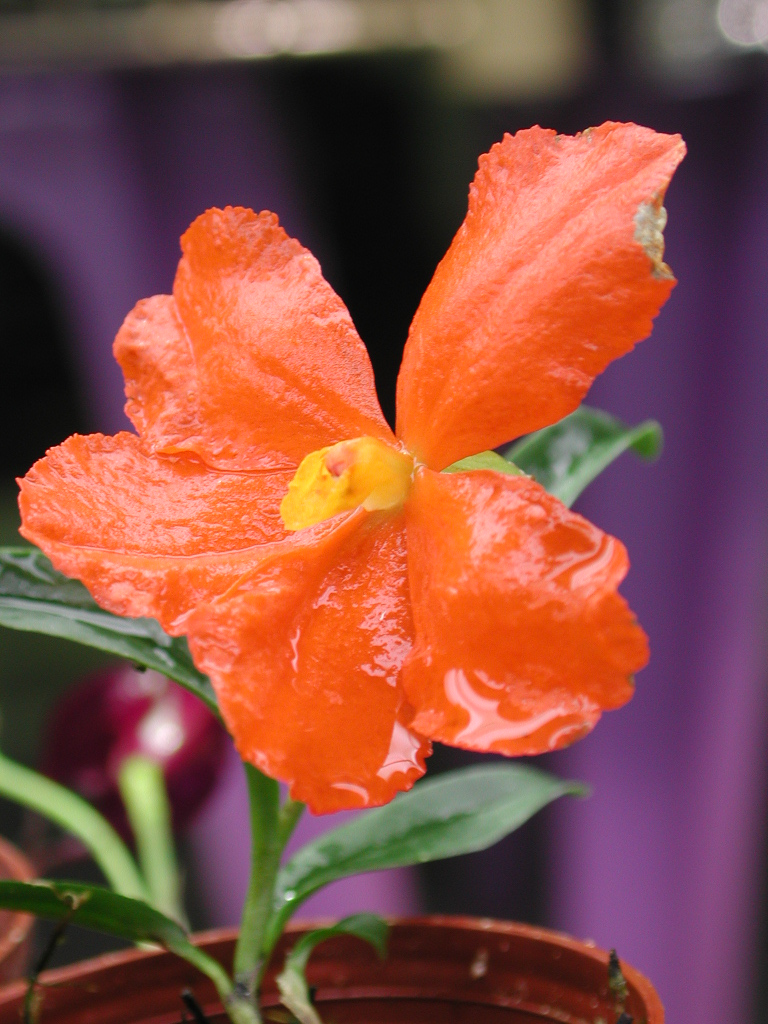
Neocogniauxia

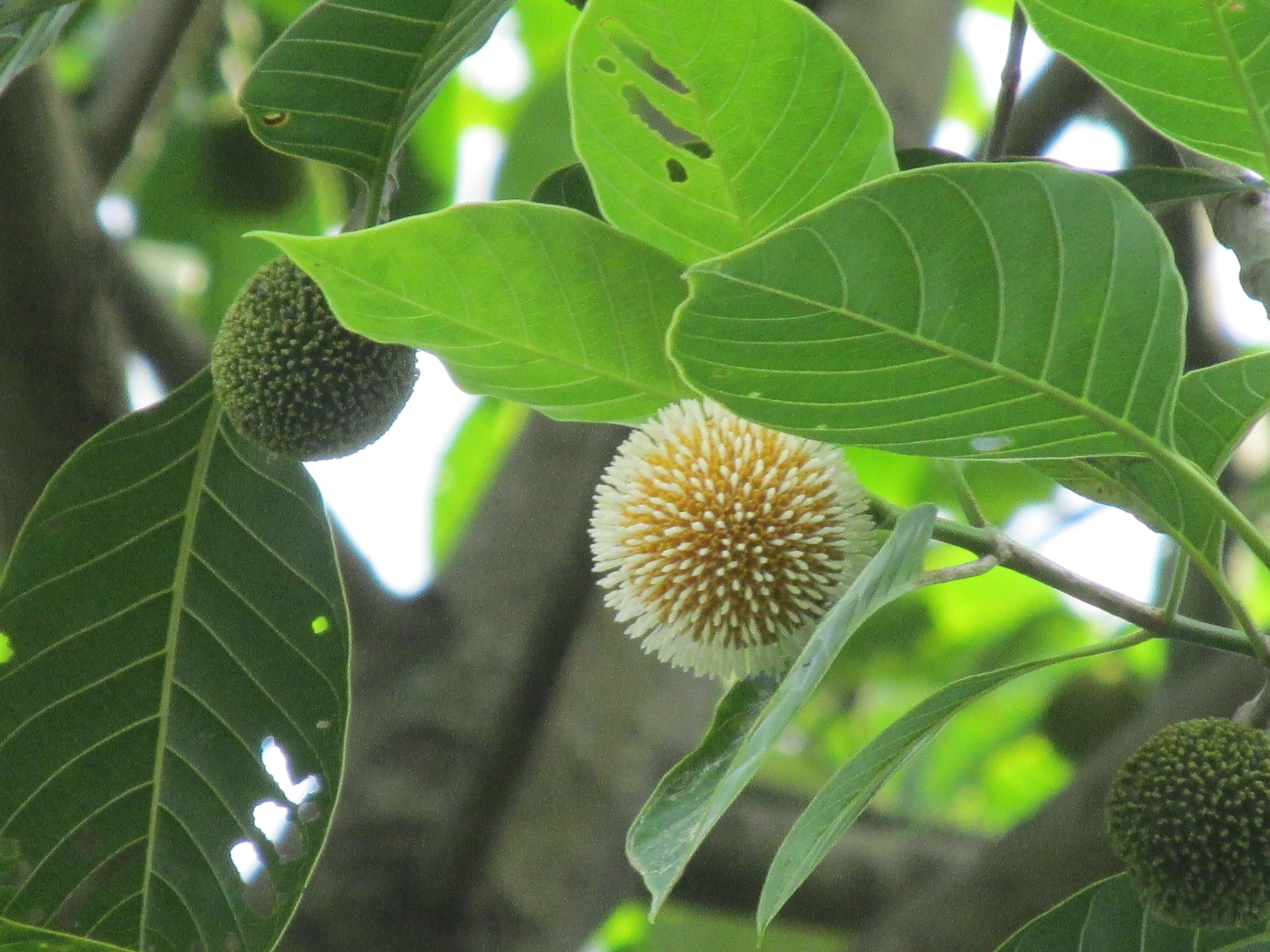
Neolamarckia

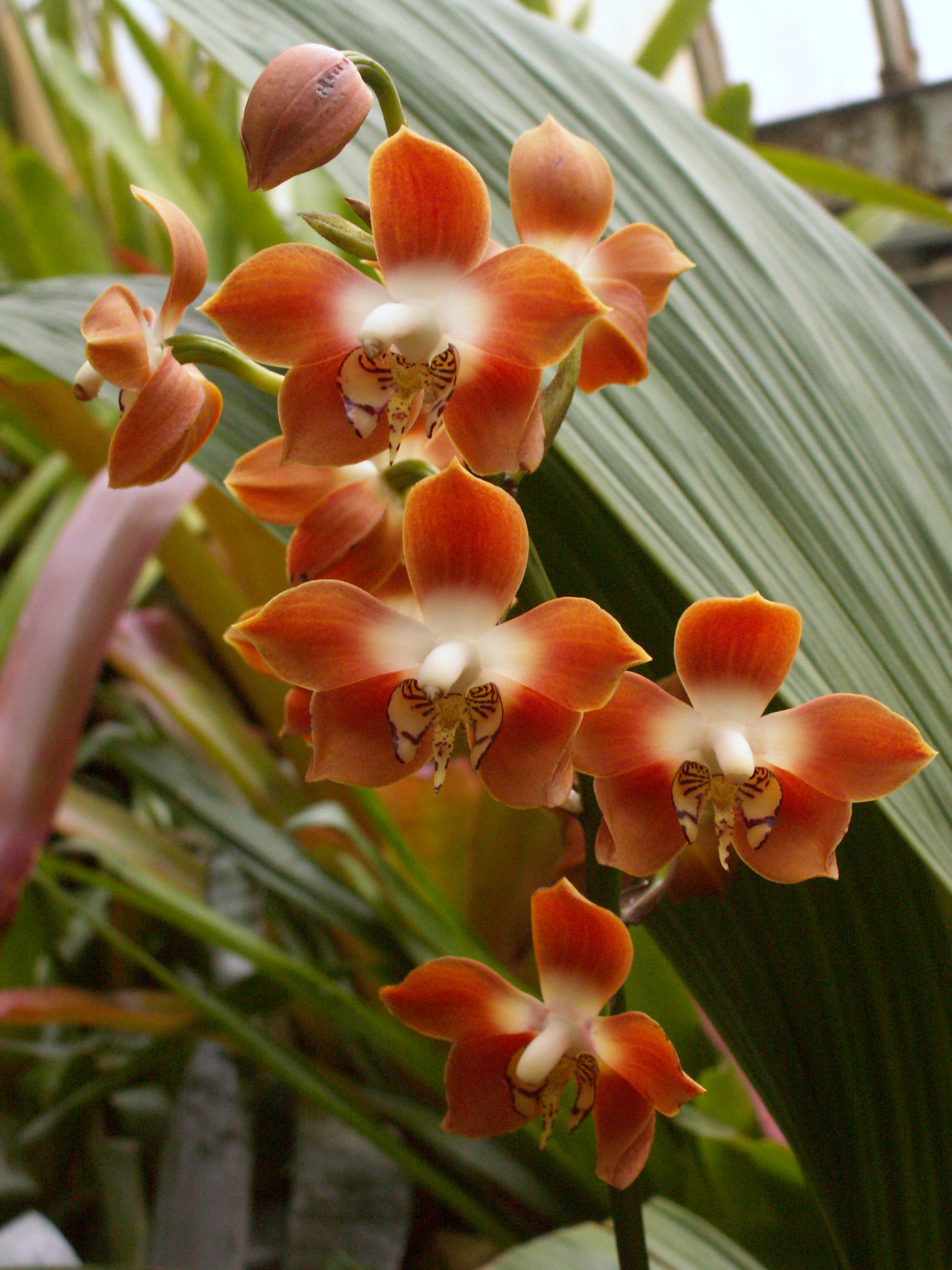
Neomoorea

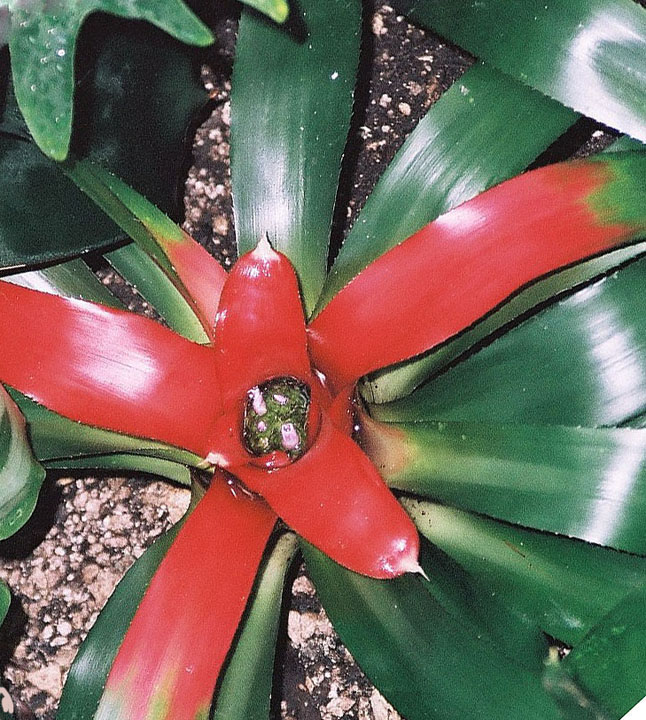
Neoregelia

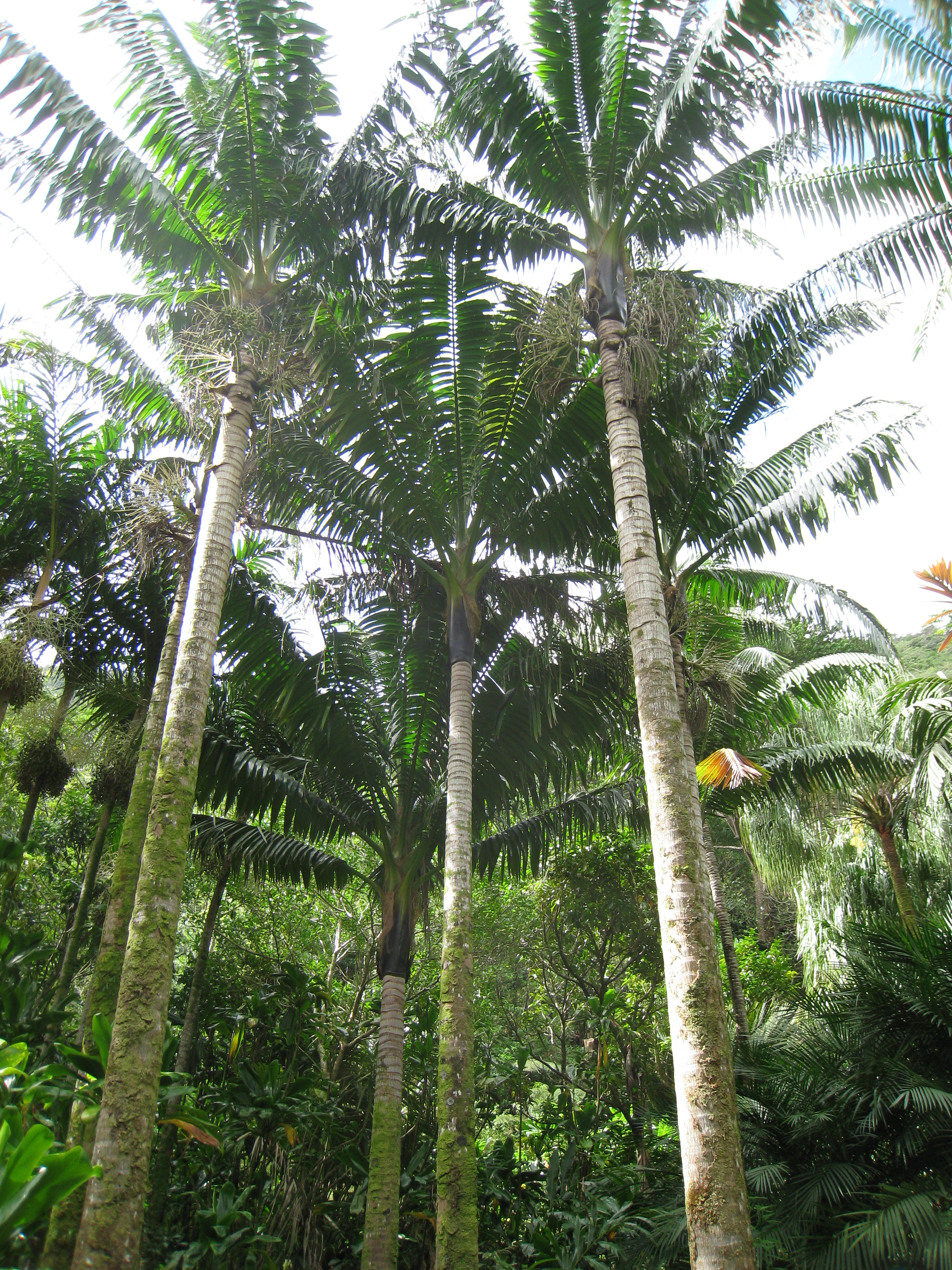
Neoveitchia

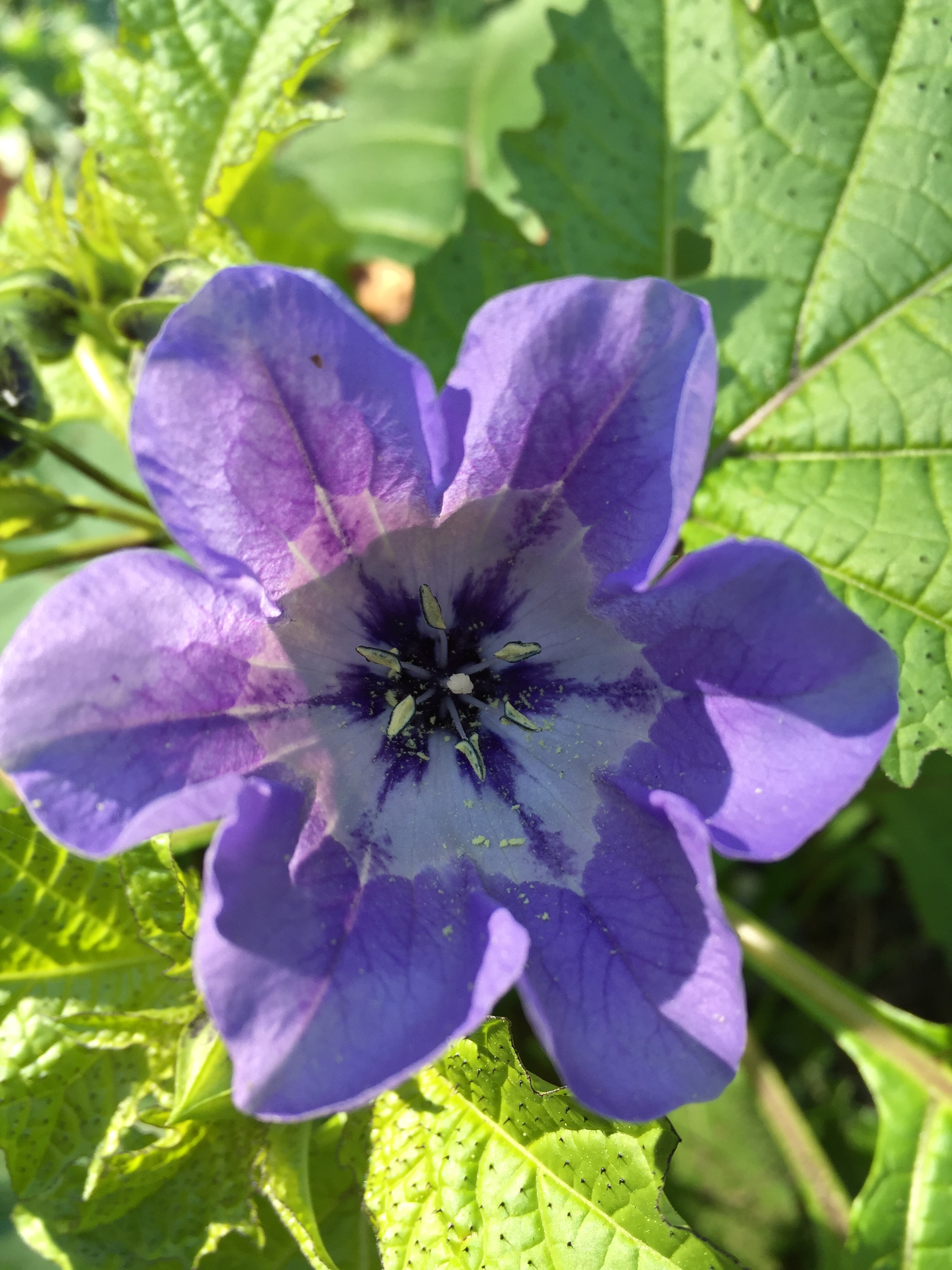
Nicandra

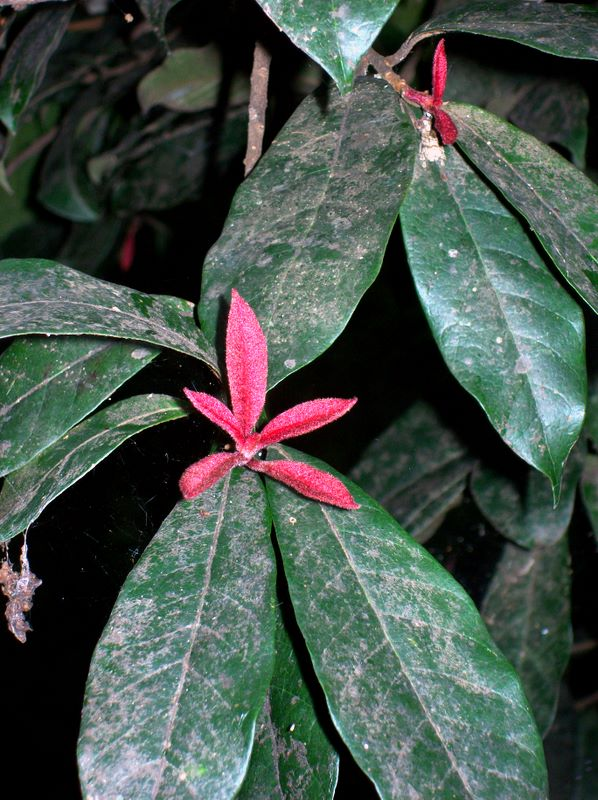
Niemeyera

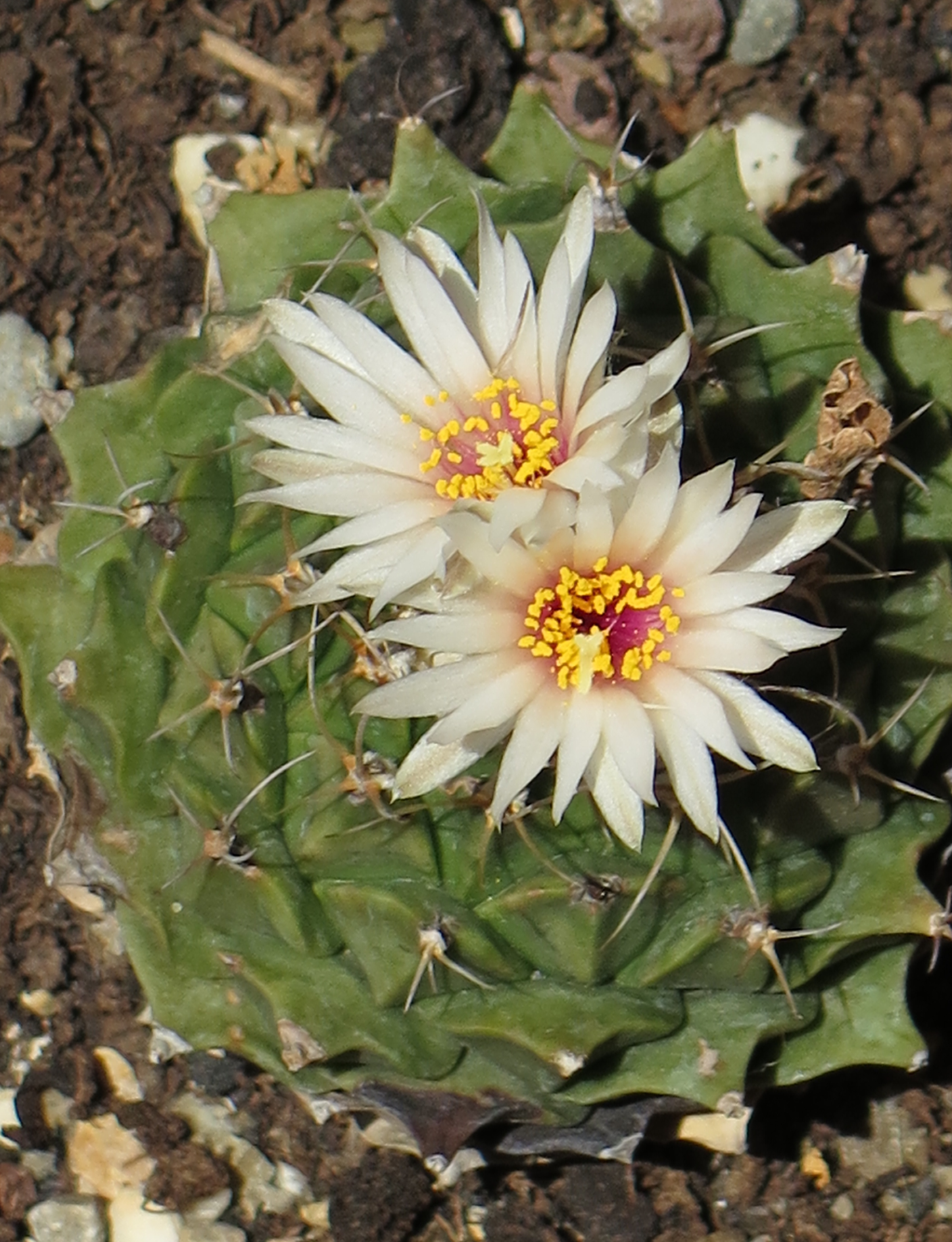
Obregonia

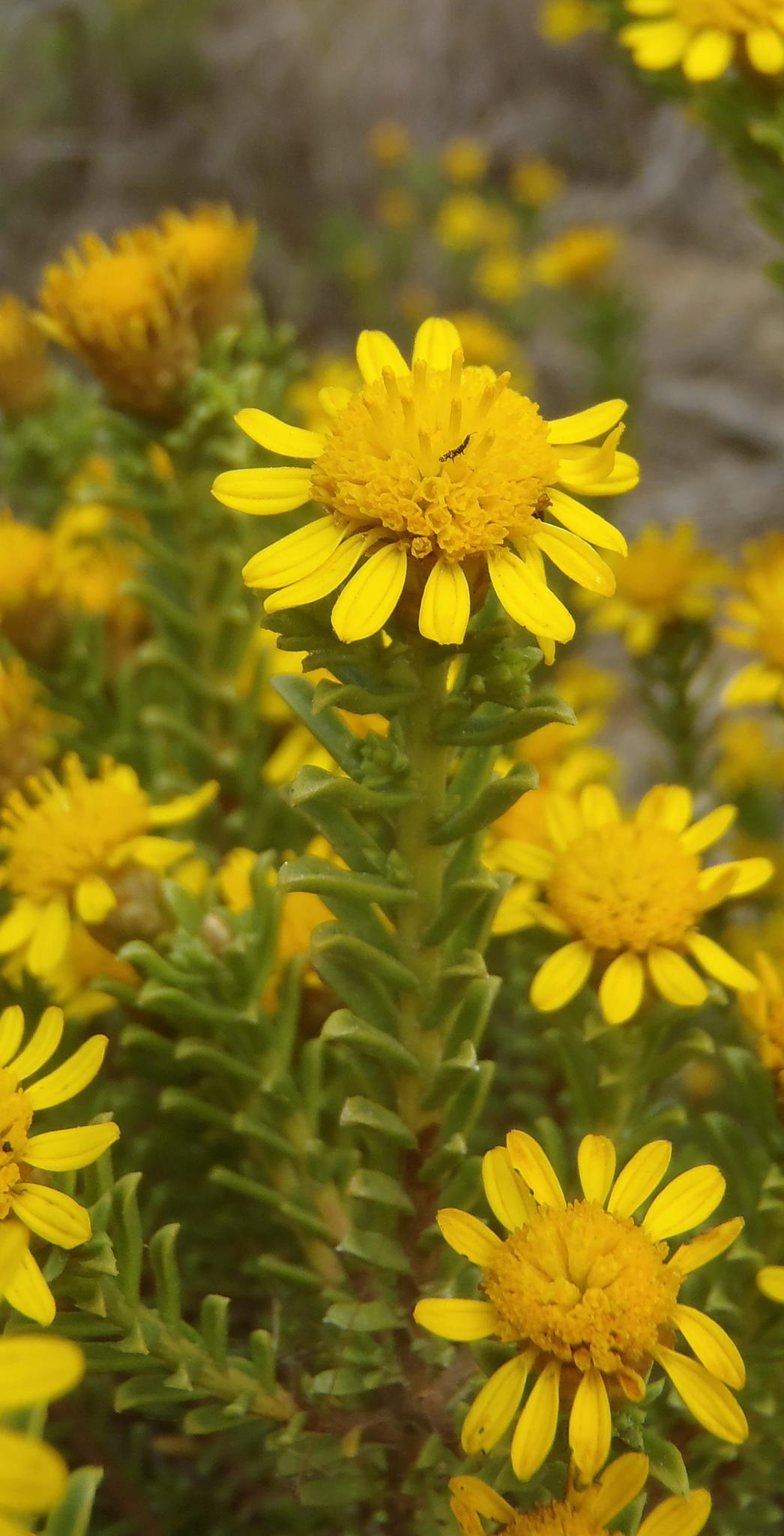
Oedera

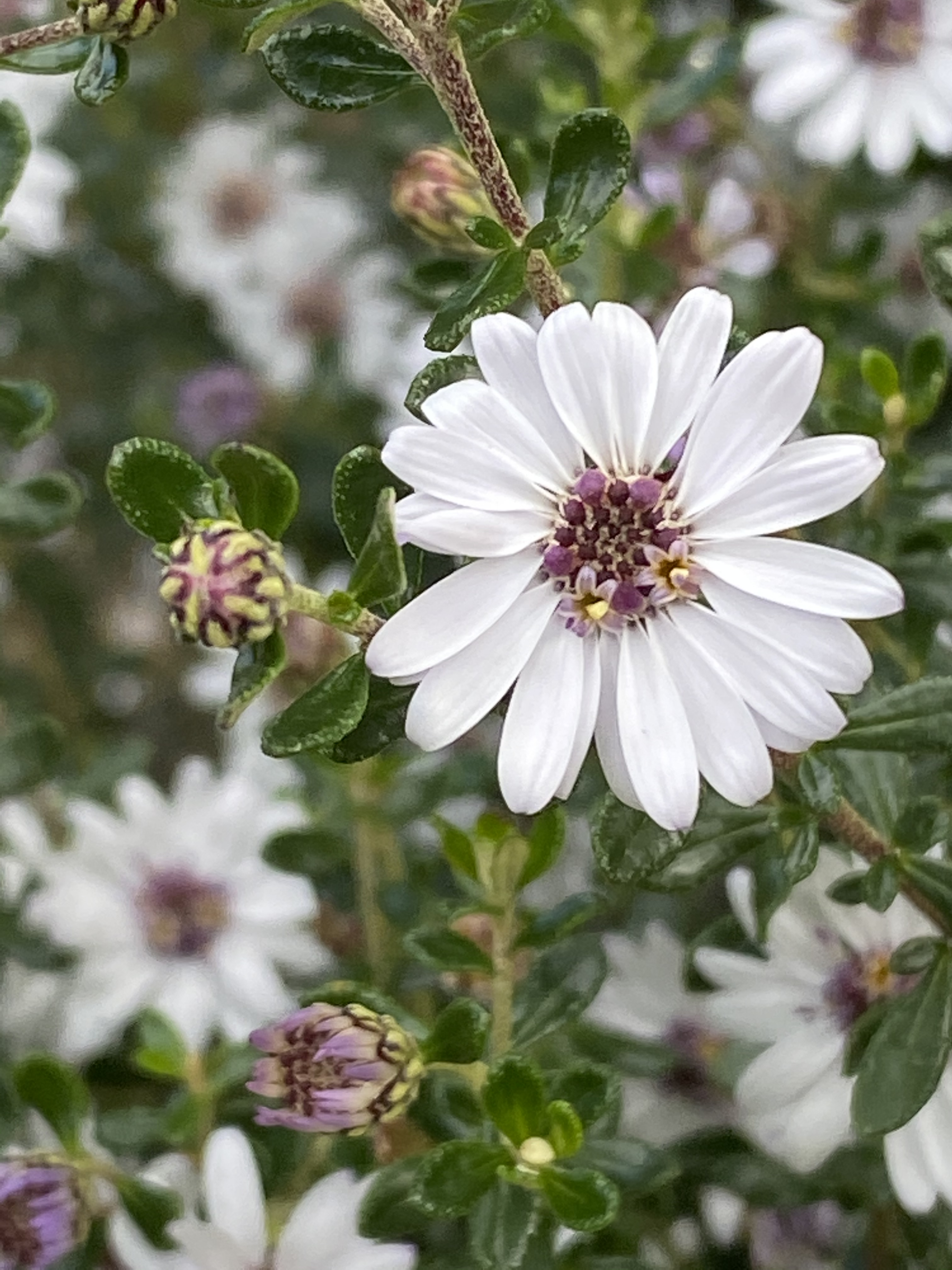
Olearia

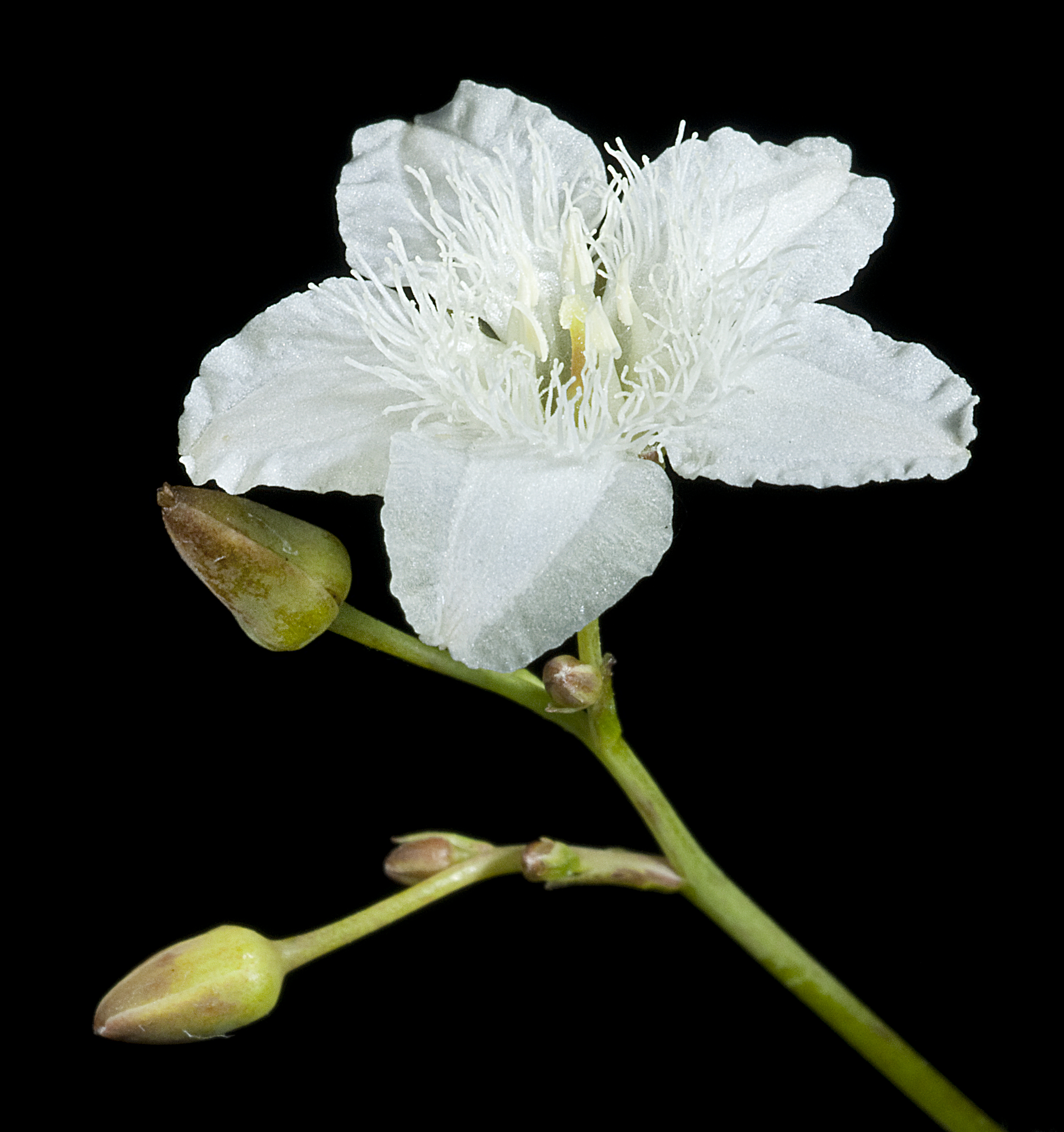
Ornduffia

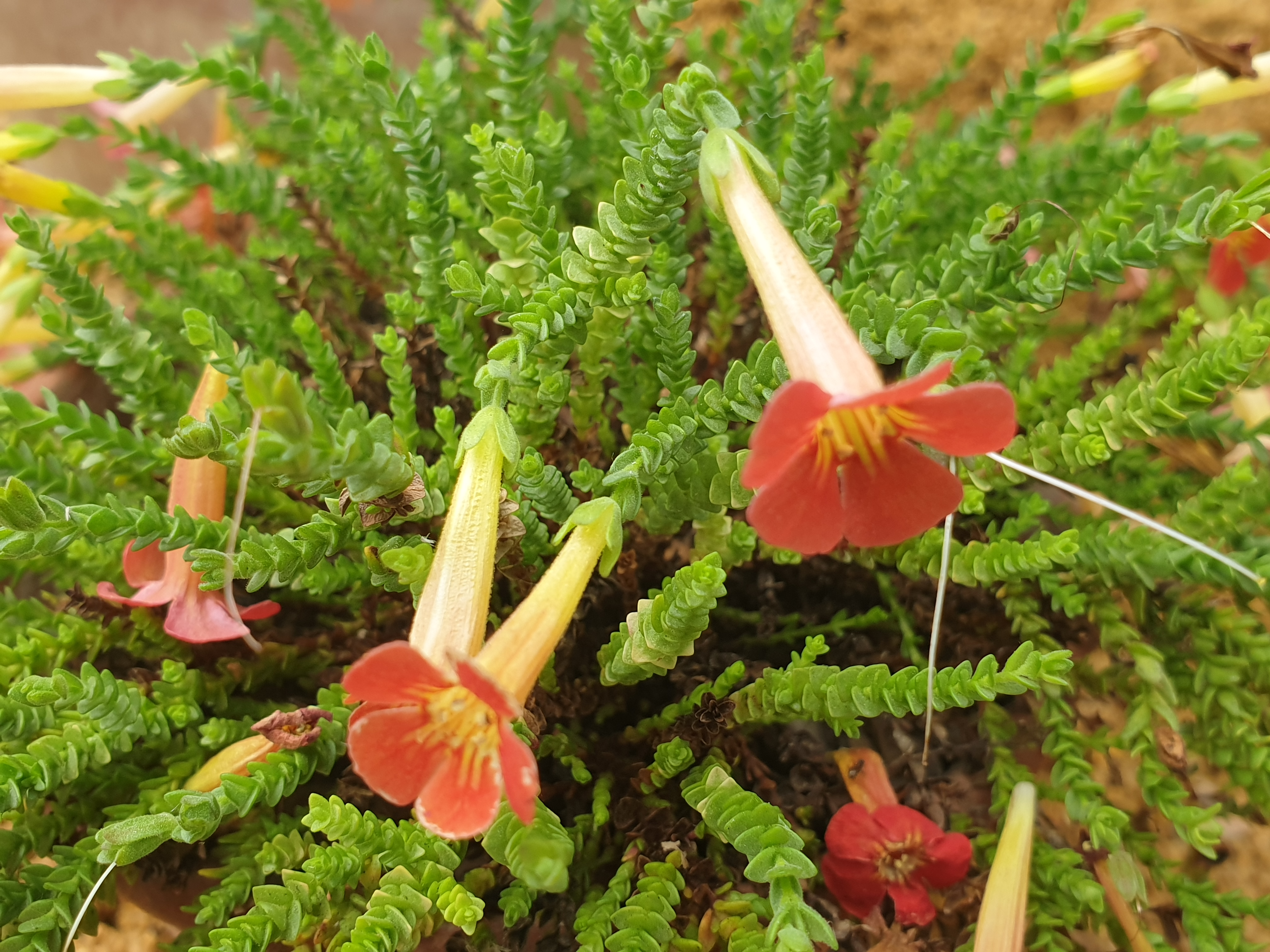
Ourisia

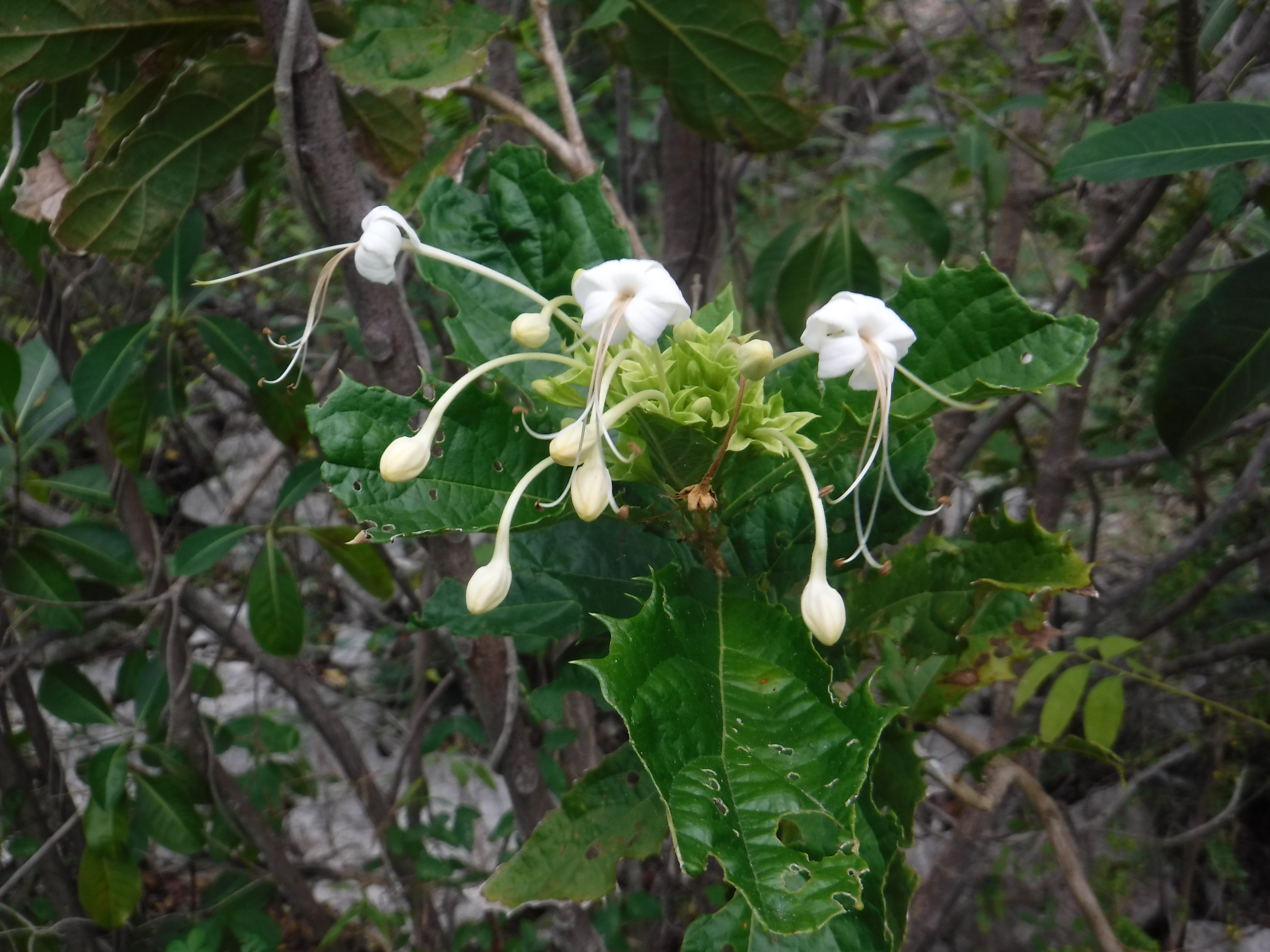
Ovieda

Genera
Genus (Note: Page numbers for references are omitted, since all the references list genera alphabetically except for Plants of the World, which is mainly cited for genera that match their family names.)	Person honored (Note: Except for the people with an indication in their name or description that they were known for something else, all are remembered for their work as naturalists.)	Plant family	Ref
Kabuyea	Christine H. Sophie Kabuye (b. 1938), director of the East African Herbarium in Nairobi, Kenya	Tecophilaeaceae	Bu
Kadenicarpus	Nikolai Nikolayevich Kaden (1914–1976), Russian botanist	Cactaceae	Bu
Kadua	Kadu (19th century), an advisor to the king of Micronesia; joined one of Otto von Kotzebue's expeditions	Rubiaceae	Bu
Kaempferia	Engelbert Kaempfer (1651–1716)	Zingiberaceae	St
Kageneckia	Johann Friedrich von Kageneck (1741–1800), Austrian ambassador in Stockholm, Copenhagen, London and Madrid; a botanical patron	Rosaceae	Bu
Kailarsenia	Kai Larsen (1926–2012)	Rubiaceae	Qu
Kaisupeea	Supee Saksuwan Larsen (b. 1939) and her husband Kai Larsen (1926–2012)	Gesneriaceae	Bu
Kajewskiella	Sethrick Frank Kajewski (1904–1970), plant collector in Australia and the South Pacific	Rubiaceae	Bu
Kalbreyeriella	Guillermo Kalbreyer (1847–1912)	Acanthaceae	Bu
Kallstroemia	Anders Kallstroem (1733–1812), Scandinavian botanist	Zygophyllaceae	Bu
Kalmia	Pehr Kalm (1716–1779)	Ericaceae	Co
Kamelinia	Rudolf Vladimirovich Kamelin (1938–2016), Russian botanist at the university in Saint Petersburg; interested in plant systematics and distribution	Apiaceae	Bu
Kanjilalia	Upendra Nath Kanjilal (1859–1928), an Indian botanist and forest officer	Fabaceae	
Kardomia	Karel Domin (1882–1953)	Myrtaceae	Bu
Karelinia	Grigory Karelin (1801–1872), Russian naturalist; studied botany under Eduard Friedrich Eversmann; explored Siberia, the Kyrgyz steppes and the Caspian shore	Asteraceae	Bu
Karina	Karin Tanguy, granddaughter of Raymond Boutique (1906–1985)	Gentianaceae	Bu
Karpatiosorbus	Zoltán Kárpáti (1909–1972), Hungarian (Geo-)Botanist, Taxonomist, Dendrologist and specialist in Sorbus	Rosaceae	Bt
Karwinskia	Wilhelm Friedrich Karwinsky von Karwin (1780–1855)	Rhamnaceae	Bu
Kaufmannia	Konstantin Petrovich von Kaufmann (1818–1882), colonial administrator	Primulaceae	Bu
Kaunia	Edward Gordon Kaun (1922–1992), American researcher from Baltimore, Maryland; assisted Robert Merrill King and others	Asteraceae	Bu
Kayea	Robert Kaye Greville (1794–1866)	Calophyllaceae	Bu
Kearnemalvastrum	Thomas Henry Kearney (1874–1956)	Malvaceae	Bu
Keayodendron	Ronald William John Keay (1920–1998)	Phyllanthaceae	Bu
Keckiella	David D. Keck (1903–1995)	Plantaginaceae	Ba
Keetia	Johan Diederik Möhr Keet (1882–1976), South African botanist and plant collector; forest director in the Transvaal	Rubiaceae	Bu
Kefersteinia	Christoph Ludwig Albrecht Keferstein (1792–1872), German entrepreneur; orchid enthusiast who maintained a botanical park	Orchidaceae	Bu
Kegeliella	Hermann Aribert Heinrich Kegel (1819–1856), German gardener at a botanical garden in Halle	Orchidaceae	Bu
Kelleria	possibly Johann Christoph Keller (1737–1795), German illustrator and engraver, or Johann Christoph Keller (fl. c. 1590), Austrian mathematician, or Engelhardt Keller, who wrote Über den Wein ("On Wine", 1838)	Thymelaeaceae	Bu
Kelleronia	Conrad Keller (1848–1930), Swiss zoologist and botanist, professor of zoology at ETH Zurich	Zygophyllaceae	Bu
Kellochloa	Elizabeth Anne Kellog (b.1951) an American botanist from Harvard University	Poaceae	Bt
Kelloggia	Albert Kellogg (1813–1887)	Rubiaceae	Qu
Kelseya	Francis Duncan Kelsey (1849–1905), reverend; authority on the plants of the US state of Montana	Rosaceae	Qu
Kemulariella	Liubov Kemularia-Nathadze (1891–1985)	Asteraceae	Bu
Kendrickia	George Henry Kendrick Thwaites (1811–1882)	Melastomataceae	Bu
Kengyilia	Yi Li Keng (1898–1975)	Poaceae	Bu
Kennedia	John Kennedy (1759–1842), original partner of Lee and Kennedy (nurseries)	Fabaceae	St
Kentiopsis	Willem Kent (1779–1827), Dutch head gardener of the botanical garden of the former university in Harderwijk and botanical garden curator in Bogor in present-day Indonesia (Note: Present-day geographical names are used wherever possible.)	Arecaceae	Bu
Keraymonia	Monique Keraudren (1928–1981)	Apiaceae	Bu
Kerbera	Edmund Kerber (c. 1848 – 1887), plant collector in Mexico and China	Apocynaceae	Bu
Kermadecia	Jean-Michel Huon de Kermadec (1748–1793), naval officer	Proteaceae	Bu
Kernera	Johann Simon von Kerner (1755–1830)	Brassicaceae	St
Kerria	William Kerr (1799–1814)	Rosaceae	Co
Kerriochloa	Arthur Francis George Kerr (1877–1942)	Poaceae	Bu
Kerriodoxa	Arthur Francis George Kerr (1877–1942)	Arecaceae	Bu
Kerriothyrsus	Arthur Francis George Kerr (1877–1942)	Melastomataceae	Bu
Keteleeria	Jean Baptiste Keteleer (1813–1903), French horticulturalist	Pinaceae	St
Keysseria	Christian Keyser (1877–1961)	Asteraceae	Bu
Kickxia	Jean Kickx (1803–1864)	Plantaginaceae	St
Kielmeyera	Carl Friedrich Kielmeyer (1765–1844)	Calophyllaceae	Bu
Kiggelaria	Franz Kiggelaer (1648–1722)	Achariaceae	Bu
Killickia	Donald Joseph Boomer Killick (1926–2008), South African botanist at Kew Gardens and elsewhere	Lamiaceae	Bu
Killipia	Ellsworth Paine Killip (1890–1968)	Melastomataceae	Bu
Kingdonia	Selina Mary Ward (born Kingdon) (1854–1922), wife of Harry Marshall Ward	Circaeasteraceae	Bu
Kinghamia	Diana Louise Kingham (fl. 1976); wrote a study on African pollen at the University of Leeds in England	Asteraceae	Bu
Kingia	Phillip Parker King (1791–1856) and Philip Gidley King (1758–1808)	Dasypogonaceae	Bu
Kingianthus	Robert Merrill King (1930–2007), American botanist who worked at the National Museum of Natural History in Washington, D.C.	Asteraceae	Bu
Kippistia	Richard Kippist (1812–1882)	Asteraceae	Qu
Kirkbridea	Joseph Harold Kirkbride (b. 1943), American botanist who worked at the National Arboretum and as a curator at the Department of Agriculture herbarium	Melastomataceae	Bu
Kirkia	John Kirk (1832–1922)	Kirkiaceae	Bu
Kitagawia	Masao Kitagawa (1910–1995)	Apiaceae	Bu
Kitaibelia	Pál Kitaibel (1757–1817). Previously Kitaibela.	Malvaceae	Co
Kjellbergiodendron	Gunnar Konstantin Kjellberg (1885–1943), Swedish botanist who collected in Europe and around the Celebes Sea	Myrtaceae	Bu
Klackenbergia	Jens Klackenberg (b. 1951), Swedish professor of botany at Stockholm University	Gentianaceae	Bu
Klaineanthus	Théophile Klaine (1842–1911), French clergyman and plant collector	Euphorbiaceae	Bu
Klainedoxa	Théophile Klaine (1842–1911), French clergyman and plant collector	Irvingiaceae	Bu
Klaprothia	Martin Heinrich Klaproth (1743–1817)	Loasaceae	Bu
Klarobelia	Robert Elias Fries (1876–1966), Swedish botanist and mycologist, botanical garden director in Stockholm	Annonaceae	Bu
Klasea	Lars Magnus Klase (1722–1766), Swedish doctor in Jönköping, student of Carl Linnaeus	Asteraceae	Bu
Klattia	Friedrich Wilhelm Klatt (1825–1897)	Iridaceae	Bu
Kleinhovia	Christiaan Kleynhoff, later Lord van Enspijk (d. 1777), German-born Dutch doctor in the service of the Dutch West India Company; director of the medicinal garden of the Dutch East India Company in Jakarta	Malvaceae	Bu
Kleinia	Jacob Theodor Klein (1685–1759)	Asteraceae	St
Klossia	C. Boden Kloss (1877–1949)	Rubiaceae	Bu
Klotzschia	Johann Friedrich Klotzsch (1805–1860)	Apiaceae	Bu
Knautia	Christian Knaut (1656–1716) and his brother Christoph Knaut	Caprifoliaceae	Co
Knightia	Thomas Andrew Knight (1759–1838)	Proteaceae	St
Kniphofia	Johann Hieronymus Kniphof (1704–1763)	Asphodelaceae	Co
Knorringia	Olga Knorring (1887–1978)	Polygonaceae	Bu
Knowltonia	Thomas Knowlton (1692–1781)	Ranunculaceae	Bu
Knoxia	Robert Knox (1641–1720), sea captain	Rubiaceae	Bu
Kochummenia	Kizhakkedathu Mathai Kochummen (1931–1999), Indian-born Malaysian botanist at the Forest Research Institute Malaysia in Kepong; specialist in Malaysian trees	Rubiaceae	Bu
Koeberlinia	Christoph Ludwig Köberlin (1794–1862), German botanist and clergyman who researched plants near Memmingen and in the Alps	Koeberliniaceae	Bu
Koehneola	Bernhard Adalbert Emil Koehne (1848–1918)	Asteraceae	Qu
Koehneria	Bernhard Adalbert Emil Koehne (1848–1918)	Lythraceae	Qu
Koeleria	Georg Ludwig Koeler (1764–1807), German personal physician and professor of botany and medicine in Mainz; focused on grasses	Poaceae	Ba
Koellensteinia	Karl Kellner von Koellenstein (1807–1849), Austrian military officer who collected plants near Venice and Verona	Orchidaceae	Bu
Koelpinia	Alexander Bernhard Kölpin (1739–1801), German doctor and botanical garden director in Greifswald	Asteraceae	Bu
Koelreuteria	Joseph Gottlieb Kölreuter (1733–1806)	Sapindaceae	Co
Koenigia	Johann Gerhard König (1728–1785)	Polygonaceae	Bu
Koernickanthe	Friedrich August Körnicke (1828–1908)	Marantaceae	Bu
Kohautia	Franz Kohaut (d. 1822)	Rubiaceae	Bu
Kohleria	Johann Michael Kohler (1812–1884), Swiss teacher	Gesneriaceae	St
Komarovia	Vladimir Leontyevich Komarov (1869–1945)	Apiaceae	Bu
Koordersiochloa	Sijfert Hendrik Koorders (1863–1919), Dutch-Indonesian botanist and mycologist in Bogor, and herbarium director beginning in 1903	Poaceae	Bu
Koordersiodendron	Sijfert Hendrik Koorders (1863–1919), Dutch-Indonesian botanist and mycologist in Bogor, and herbarium director beginning in 1903	Anacardiaceae	Bu
Kopsia	Jan Kops (1765–1849)	Apocynaceae	Bu
Kopsiopsis	Jan Kops (1765–1849)	Orobanchaceae	Bu
Korshinskia	Sergéi Korzhinski (1861–1900), Russian botanist who studied plant distribution, professor at the university in Tomsk; later worked at a botanical garden and botanical museum in Saint Petersburg	Apiaceae	Bu
Korthalsella	Pieter Willem Korthals (1807–1892), Dutch botanist	Santalaceae	Bu
Korthalsia	Pieter Willem Korthals (1807–1892), Dutch botanist	Arecaceae	St
Kosteletzkya	Vincenz Kosteletzky (1801–1887), medical botanist in Prague (present-day Czech Republic)	Malvaceae	St
Kostermansia	André Joseph Guillaume Henri Kostermans (1906–1994)	Malvaceae	Bu
Kostermanthus	André Joseph Guillaume Henri Kostermans (1906–1994)	Chrysobalanaceae	Bu
Kotschya	Theodor Kotschy (1813–1866)	Fabaceae	Bu
Koyamaea	Tetsuo Michael Koyama (b. 1933), Japanese botanist at the New York Botanical Garden; specialist in Cyperaceae	Cyperaceae	Bu
Koyamasia	Hiroshige Koyama (b. 1937)	Asteraceae	Bu
Kozlovia	Pyotr Kozlov (1863–1935)	Apiaceae	Bu
Krameria	Wilhelm Heinrich Kramer (1724–1765)	Krameriaceae	Ch
Krapovickasia	Antonio Krapovickas (1921–2015)	Malvaceae	Qu
Krascheninnikovia	Stepan Krasheninnikov (1711–1755)	Amaranthaceae	Bu
Krasnovia	Andrey Krasnov (1862–1914), Russian naturalist; professor of geography and biology in Kharkiv, Ukraine; founded botanical gardens there and in Batumi in Georgia	Apiaceae	Bu
Krauseola	Johannes Krause (1900–1979), German botanist	Caryophyllaceae	Bu
Kraussia	Christian Ferdinand Friedrich Krauss (1812–1890)	Rubiaceae	Bu
Kremeriella	Jean Pierre Kremer (1812–1867), French doctor and botanist from Metz	Brassicaceae	Bu
Krigia	David Krieg (1667–1713), German physician and collector	Asteraceae	St
Krubera	Johann Julius Kruber (d. 1826), doctor and botanist in Moscow, Russia	Apiaceae	Bu
Krugiodendron	Karl Wilhelm Leopold Krug (1833–1898)	Rhamnaceae	Bu
Krukoviella	Boris Alexander Krukoff (1898–1983), Russian-born American botanist who collected in South America, West Africa and Sumatra; was later a curator at the herbarium of the New York Botanical Garden	Ochnaceae	Bu
Kubitzkia	Klaus Kubitzki (b. 1933)	Lauraceae	Bu
Kudoacanthus	Yūshun Kudō (1887–1932), Japanese professor of botany and botanical garden director in Taipei, Taiwan; founded a herbarium	Acanthaceae	Bu
Kudrjaschevia	Serafim Nikolaevich Kudrjaschev (1907–1943), botanical author	Lamiaceae	Bu
Kuepferia	Philippe Küpfer (b. 1942), Swiss professor of botany at the University of Neuchâtel; specialist in Gentianaceae and Ranunculaceae	Gentianaceae	Bu
Kuhlhasseltia	Heinrich Kuhl (1797–1821) and Johan Conrad van Hasselt (1797–1823)	Orchidaceae	Bu
Kuhlmanniodendron	João Geraldo Kuhlmann (1882–1958)	Achariaceae	Bu
Kummerowia	Heinrich Johannes Gotthilf Kummerow (1860–1929), Polish professor in Bromberg	Fabaceae	Bt
Kundmannia	Johann Christian Kundmann (1684–1751), German doctor in Wrocław with a large naturalist collection	Apiaceae	Bu
Kunhardtia	Henry Rudolf Kunhardt (1889–1963), president of a petroleum company in Venezuela; financed botanical expeditions for the New York Botanical Garden; also an orchid collector	Rapateaceae	Bu
Kunstleria	Jacob Heinrich Hermann Kunstler (1837–1887), German naturalist from Haldensleben; collected plants and insects in Australia, and plants in present-day Malaysia for a botanical garden in Kolkata	Fabaceae	Bu
Kuntheria	Carl Sigismund Kunth (1788–1850)	Colchicaceae	Qu
Kunzea	Gustav Kunze (1793–1851)	Myrtaceae	St
Kurzamra	Federico Kurtz (1854–1920)	Lamiaceae	Bu
Kutchubaea	Viktor Kochubey (1768–1834), statesman	Rubiaceae	Bu
Kydia	Robert Kyd (1746–1793)	Malvaceae	Bu
Kyhosia	Donald William Kyhos (1929–2022), American professor of botany at the University of California, Los Angeles; focused on the genetics of Asteraceae	Asteraceae	Bu
Kyrsteniopsis	Johann Jakob Kirsten (1710–1765), German doctor, botanist, chemist and theologian; professor and dean in Altdorf bei Nürnberg	Asteraceae	Bu
Labichea	Jean Jacques Labiche (1784–1819), French naval officer	Fabaceae	St
Labourdonnaisia	Bertrand-François Mahé de La Bourdonnais (1699–1753), colonial administrator	Sapotaceae	Bu
Labramia	Jonas David Labram (1785–1852), Swiss botanical artist and illustrator	Sapotaceae	Bu
Lachenalia	Werner de la Chenal (1736–1800), Swiss professor of botany	Asparagaceae	St
Lackeya	James A. Lackey (b. 1943), American botanist at Iowa State University and the Smithsonian Institution; specialist in Fabaceae and Phaseoleae	Fabaceae	Bu
Ladeania	LaDean H. Egan (b. 1949), mother of Ashley Noel Egan (b. 1977), the author of the genus	Fabaceae	Bu
Ladenbergia	Johann Philipp von Ladenberg (1769–1847), Prussian lawyer who founded an educational institute for the sons of underprivileged forest officials	Rubiaceae	Bu
Ladyginia	Veniamin Fedorovich Ladygin (1860–1932), Russian botanist who collected in East Asia	Apiaceae	Bu
Laelia	Laelia, one of the Vestal Virgins	Orchidaceae	St
Laennecia	René Laennec (1781–1826), doctor	Asteraceae	Bu
Laestadia	Carl Petter Laestadius (1835–1920), Swedish botanist and teacher in Umeå	Asteraceae	Bu
Lafoensia	João Carlos de Bragança e Ligne, 2nd Duke of Lafões (1719–1806)	Lythraceae	Bu
Lafuentea	Tadeo Lafuente (b. c. 1780), Spanish military doctor who wrote about yellow fever	Plantaginaceae	Bu
Lagascea	Mariano Lagasca (1776–1839)	Asteraceae	Bu
Lagerstroemia	Magnus von Lagerström (d. 1759), Swedish merchant and naturalist, and friend of Carl Linnaeus	Lythraceae	Co
Lagrezia	Adrien Rose Arnaud Lagrèze-Fossat (1814 or 1818 – 1874), French botanist and lawyer in Moissac	Amaranthaceae	Bu
Lagunaria	Andréa Laguna (d. 1560), Spanish botanist	Malvaceae	St
Lalldhwojia	Lall Dhwoj (fl. 1927–1930), plant collector	Apiaceae	Bu
Lallemantia	Julius Léopold Eduard Avé-Lallemant (1803–1867)	Lamiaceae	St
Lamanonia	Robert de Lamanon (1752–1787)	Cunoniaceae	Bu
Lamarckia	Jean-Baptiste Lamarck (1744–1829)	Poaceae	St
Lambertia	Aylmer Bourke Lambert (1761–1842)	Proteaceae	St
Lamiodendron	Herman Johannes Lam (1892–1977)	Bignoniaceae	Bu
Lamourouxia	Jean Vincent Félix Lamouroux (1779–1825)	Orobanchaceae	Bu
Lamyropappus	Claude Marie Louise de Lamyre-Moryy, Comtesse de Neuville (1754–1791), French wife of Dominique, comte de Cassini	Asteraceae	Bt
Lamyropsis	Claude Marie Louise de Lamyre-Moryy, Comtesse de Neuville (1754–1791), French wife of Dominique, comte de Cassini	Asteraceae	Bt
Lancea	John Henry Lance (1793–1878), English lawyer and botanist; a lawyer and judge in Suriname for six years; orchid enthusiast	Mazaceae	Bu
Landiopsis	Jérôme Lalande (1732–1807), astronomer	Rubiaceae	Bu
Landolphia	Jean-François Landolphe (1747–1825), naval officer	Apocynaceae	Bu
Langloisia	Auguste Berthélemy Langlois (1832–1900), French-born American clergyman and botanist	Polemoniaceae	Bu
Langsdorffia	Georg von Langsdorff (1774–1852)	Balanophoraceae	Qu
Lankesterella	Charles Herbert Lankester (1879–1969), English-born Costa Rican naturalist and botanist; coffee planter; specialist in orchids	Orchidaceae	Bu
Lankesteria	Edwin Lankester (1814–1874)	Acanthaceae	Bu
Lapageria	Empress Joséphine (Marie de La Pagerie)	Philesiaceae	Co
Lapeirousia	Philippe-Isidore Picot de Lapeyrouse (1744–1818)	Iridaceae	St
Lapiedra	Maria Josefa Martínez (1775–1858), Spanish botanist	Amaryllidaceae	Bu
Laportea	possibly named after M. Laporte, a companion of Charles Gaudichaud-Beaupré on his botanical voyage on the ship Uranie	Urticaceae	St
Lardizabala	Manuel de Lardizábal y Uribe (1744–1824), politician	Lardizabalaceae	Ch
Larrea	Juan Antonio Hernández Pérez de Larrea (1731–1803)	Zygophyllaceae	St
Larryleachia	Leslie Charles Leach (1909–1996)	Apocynaceae	Bu
Larsenaikia	Kai Larsen (1926–2012)	Rubiaceae	Bu
Larsenianthus	Kai Larsen (1926–2012)	Zingiberaceae	Bu
Lasjia	Lawrence Alexander Sidney Johnson (1925–1997)	Proteaceae	Bu
Lastarriaea	José Victorino Lastarria (1817–1888), politician	Polygonaceae	Bu
Lasthenia	Lastheneia of Mantinea (4th century BC), student of Plato	Asteraceae	St
Latouchea	John David Digues La Touche (1861–1935) and his wife, née Caroline Dawson Focken (c. 1871 – c. 1945)	Gentianaceae	Bu
Latrobea	Charles La Trobe (1801–1875), colonial administrator who established a botanical garden	Fabaceae	Bu
Laubertia	Carlo Lauberg (1762–1834), French military apothecary from Naples, Italy; senior health inspector in civil service (succeeding Antoine-Augustin Parmentier); wrote about Cinchona and quinine	Apocynaceae	Bu
Launaea	Jean Claude Mien Mordant de Launey (1750–1816), French lawyer and natural scientist; librarian at the National Museum of Natural History	Asteraceae	Bu
Laurembergia	Peter Lauremberg (1585–1639), polymath	Haloragaceae	Bu
Lauterbachia	Carl Adolf Georg Lauterbach (1864–1937)	Monimiaceae	Bu
Lavatera	Johann Lavater (1611–1691)	Malvaceae	St
Lavigeria	Charles Lavigerie (1825–1892), Roman Catholic cardinal	Icacinaceae	Bu
Lavoisiera	Antoine Lavoisier (1743–1794), chemist	Melastomataceae	Bu
Lavrania	John Jacob Lavranos (b. 1926)	Apocynaceae	Bu
Lawrencella	Robert William Lawrence (1807–1833)	Asteraceae	Bu
Lawrencia	Robert William Lawrence (1807–1833)	Malvaceae	Bu
Lawsonia	Isaac Lawson (1704–1747)	Lythraceae	St
Laxmannia	Erik Laxmann (1737–1796)	Asparagaceae	Bu
Layia	George Tradescant Lay (1799–1845)	Asteraceae	St
Leandra	Leandro do Santíssimo Sacramento (1778–1829), Brazilian clergyman and botanist; botanical garden director in Rio de Janeiro	Melastomataceae	Bu
Leandriella	Jacques Désiré Leandri (1903–1982)	Acanthaceae	Bu
Leavenworthia	Melines Conklin Leavenworth (1796–1862), American doctor; collected plants in southern states and in Mexico	Brassicaceae	Bu
Lebeckia	Hendrik Julius Lebeck (1772–1800), Dutch botanist and plant collector; merchant in the service of the Dutch East India Company	Fabaceae	Bu
Lebronnecia	Guillaume Le Bronnec (1884–1968), French naturalist in the Marquesas Islands	Malvaceae	Bu
Lebrunia	Jean Paul Antoine Lebrun (1906–1985), Belgian agricultural scientist and botanist at the university in Leuven	Clusiaceae	Bu
Lebruniodendron	Jean Paul Antoine Lebrun (1906–1985), Belgian agricultural scientist and botanist at the university in Leuven	Fabaceae	Bu
Lechea	Johan Leche (1704–1764), Swedish doctor and naturalist; professor of medicine in Turku	Cistaceae	Bu
Lecointea	Paul Georges Aimé Le Cointe (1870–1956), French botanist who worked in Brazil; director of a museum in Belém	Fabaceae	Qu
Lecokia	Henri Lecoq (1802–1871)	Apiaceae	Bu
Lecomtedoxa	Paul Henri Lecomte (1856–1934)	Sapotaceae	Bu
Lecomtella	Paul Henri Lecomte (1856–1934)	Poaceae	Bu
Ledebouria	Carl Friedrich von Ledebour (1785–1851)	Asparagaceae	Ba
Ledebouriella	Carl Friedrich von Ledebour (1785–1851)	Apiaceae	Bu
Ledenbergia	Johann Philipp von Ladenberg (1769–1847), Prussian lawyer who founded an educational institute for the sons of underprivileged forest officials	Petiveriaceae	Bu
Ledermanniella	Carl Ludwig Ledermann (1875–1958), Swiss botanist and garden designer; traveled in Kamerun (now Cameroon) and around the Pacific	Podostemaceae	Bu
Leea	James Lee (1715–1795) of Lee and Kennedy (nurseries)	Vitaceae	St
Leersia	Johann Georg Daniel Leers (1727 – c. 1774), German botanist and apothecary in Herborn, Hesse; taught pharmacology; collected plants in the area, especially grasses	Poaceae	Bu
Leeuwenbergia	Anthonius Josephus Maria Leeuwenberg (1930–2010)	Euphorbiaceae	Bu
Lefebvrea	Charlemagne Théophile Lefebvre (1811–1860), French naval officer and explorer; took part in a scientific expedition in Ethiopia	Apiaceae	Bu
Legenere	Edward Lee Greene (1843–1915)	Campanulaceae	Bu
Legousia	Bénigne Legouz de Gerland (1695–1774), French historian and botanist	Campanulaceae	Co
Legrandia	Carlos Maria Diego Enrique Legrand (1901–1986), Uruguayan naturalist and botanist; specialist in Portulacaceae and Myrtaceae; national museum director	Myrtaceae	Bu
Lehmanniella	Friedrich Carl Lehmann (1850–1903)	Gentianaceae	Bu
Leibnitzia	Gottfried Wilhelm Leibniz (1646–1716), philosopher and mathematician	Asteraceae	Bu
Leiboldia	Friedrich Ernst Leibold (1804–1864)	Asteraceae	Bu
Leidesia	Carl Friedrich Seidel (d. 1898), German painter and botanist, and/or Jacob Friedrich Seidel (1789–1860), German gardener, and/or Johann Heinrich Seidel (1744–1815), German court gardener	Euphorbiaceae	Bu
Leipoldtia	C. Louis Leipoldt (1880–1947), poet	Aizoaceae	Bu
Leitneria	Edward Frederick Leitner (1812–1838)	Simaroubaceae	St
Lelya	Hugh Vandervaes Lely (1891–1947), English botanist and forester in Nigeria	Rubiaceae	Bu
Lemaireocereus	Charles Antoine Lemaire (1800–1871)	Cactaceae	Bu
Lemeltonia	Elton Martinez Carvalho Leme (b. 1960), Brazilian botanist, specialist in Brazilian Bromeliaceae at a herbarium in Rio de Janeiro	Bromeliaceae	Bu
Lemooria	Spencer Le Marchant Moore (1850–1931)	Asteraceae	Bu
Lennea	Peter Joseph Lenné (1789–1866)	Fabaceae	Bu
Lennoa	Joaquín Leño, Mexican independence fighter	Boraginaceae	Bu
Lenwebbia	Leonard Webb (1920–2008)	Myrtaceae	Bu
Lenzia	Harald Othmar Lenz (1798–1870), German teacher and naturalist in Thuringia; historian of science; specialist in fungi and sponges	Montiaceae	Bu
Leobordea	Léon de Laborde (1807–1869)	Fabaceae	Bu
Leocereus	Antonio Pacheco Leão (1872–1931), Brazilian botanist, botanical garden director in Rio de Janeiro	Cactaceae; now a synonym of Facheiroa	Bu
Leonardoxa	Jean Joseph Gustave Léonard (1920–2013), Belgian botanist at a botanical garden in Brussels	Fabaceae	Bu
Leonia	Francisco León, lawyer; patron of the botanists Hipólito Ruiz López and José Antonio Pavón Jiménez	Violaceae	Bu
Leonis	Frère León (1871–1955)	Asteraceae	Bu
Leopoldia	Leopold II, Holy Roman Emperor (1747–1792)	Asparagaceae	Bu
Leopoldinia	Maria Leopoldina of Austria (1797–1826)	Arecaceae	Qu
Lepechinia	Ivan Lepyokhin (1740–1802)	Lamiaceae	Bu
Lepechiniella	Ivan Lepyokhin (1740–1802)	Boraginaceae	Bu
Lepinia	Jules Joseph Lépine (1817–1884), French naval apothecary	Apocynaceae	Bu
Lepiniopsis	Jules Joseph Lépine (1817–1884), French naval apothecary	Apocynaceae	Bu
Leplaea	Edmond Leplae (1868–1941), Belgian agricultural engineer, professor of agriculture in Liège	Meliaceae	Bu
Lerchea	Johann Jakob Lerche (1703–1780), German-born Russian military doctor and botanist in Saint Petersburg	Rubiaceae	Bu
Lereschia	Louis François Jules Rodolphe Leresche (1808–1885), Swiss clergyman, botanist and plant collector in the Canton of Vaud	Apiaceae	Bu
Leretia	Jean de Léry (c. 1536 – c. 1613), clergyman	Icacinaceae	Bu
Lescaillea	Federico Lescaille (1794-1864), coffee grower	Asteraceae	Bu
Leschenaultia	Jean-Baptiste Leschenault de La Tour (1773–1826)	Goodeniaceae	Bu
Lespedeza	Vicente Manuel de Céspedes (1721? – 1794), colonial administrator	Fabaceae	Co
Lessertia	Jules Paul Benjamin Delessert (1773–1847)	Fabaceae	Bu
Lessingia	Gotthold Ephraim Lessing (1729–1781), writer, and his grandnephews Karl Friedrich Lessing (1808–1880), painter, and Christian Friedrich Lessing (1809–1862)	Asteraceae	Bu
Lessingianthus	Christian Friedrich Lessing (1809–1862)	Asteraceae	Bu
Letestua	Georges Marie Patrice Charles Le Testu (1877–1967), French colonial administrator in tropical Africa; later at a botanical garden in Caen	Sapotaceae	Bu
Letestudoxa	Georges Marie Patrice Charles Le Testu (1877–1967), French colonial administrator in tropical Africa; later at a botanical garden in Caen	Annonaceae	Bu
Letestuella	Georges Marie Patrice Charles Le Testu (1877–1967), French colonial administrator in tropical Africa; later at a botanical garden in Caen	Podostemaceae	Bu
Lettowianthus	Paul von Lettow-Vorbeck (1870–1964), army officer	Annonaceae	Bu
Leuchtenbergia	Maximilian de Beauharnais, 3rd Duke of Leuchtenberg (1781–1824)	Cactaceae	St
Leuenbergeria	Beat Ernst Leuenberger (1946–2010), Swiss curator of tropical collections at a botanical garden in Berlin; specialist in Pereskioideae	Cactaceae	Bu
Leunisia	Johannes Leunis (1802–1873), German clergyman and botanist in Hildesheim; taught natural history and geography	Asteraceae	Bu
Leutea	Gerfried Horand Leute (b. 1941), Austrian botanist, botanical curator at the Natural History Museum, Vienna	Apiaceae	Bu
Leuzea	Joseph-Philippe-François Deleuze (1753–1835)	Asteraceae	Bu
Levenhookia	Antonie van Leeuwenhoek (1632–1723)	Stylidiaceae	Bu
Levieria	Emilio Levier (1839–1911), Swiss-born Italian botanist, mycologist and plant collector in Florence	Monimiaceae	Bu
Lewisia	Meriwether Lewis (1774–1809), explorer	Montiaceae	Co
Lewisiopsis	Meriwether Lewis (1774–1809), explorer	Montiaceae	Bu
Leycesteria	William Leycester (1775–1831), judge and horticulturist in Bengal	Caprifoliaceae	Co
Leysera	Friedrich Wilhelm von Leysser (1731–1815)	Asteraceae	Bu
Liberatia	Liberato Joaquim Barroso (1900–1949), Brazilian botanist and agronomist	Acanthaceae	Bu
Libertia	Marie-Anne Libert (1782–1865)	Iridaceae	Co
Lichtensteinia	Hinrich Lichtenstein (1780–1857)	Apiaceae	Bu
Lidbeckia	Eric Gustav Lidbeck (1724–1803), Swedish botanist, student of Carl Linnaeus, curator of a botanical garden and professor of natural history at Lund University	Asteraceae	Bu
Liebigia	Justus von Liebig (1803–1873)	Gesneriaceae	Bu
Lijndenia	D. W. J. C. Baron Van Lijnden (1813–1852), administrator in Bogor in the former Dutch East Indies (present-day Indonesia); supported botanical research	Melastomataceae	Bu
Lilaeopsis	Alire Raffeneau Delile (1778–1850)	Apiaceae	Qu
Limahlania	Ah-Lan Lim, Malaysian Botanist and Professor at the University of Malaysia in Kuala Lumpur	Gentianaceae	Bt
Lindackeria	Johann Thaddaeus Lindacker (1768–1816), Bohemian mineralogist from Banská Štiavnica; collected plants for his herbarium	Achariaceae	Bu
Lindelofia	Friedrich von Lindelof (1794–1882), German botanical patron (c. 1850).	Boraginaceae	St
Lindenbergia	Johann Bernhard Wilhelm Lindenberg (1781–1851)	Orobanchaceae	Bu
Lindera	Johan Linder (1678–1724), Swedish botanist	Lauraceae	Co
Lindernia	Franz Balthasar von Lindern (1682–1755), French doctor and botanist in Strasbourg; university botanical garden director	Linderniaceae	Bu
Linderniella	Franz Balthasar von Lindern (1682–1755), French doctor and botanist in Strasbourg; university botanical garden director	Linderniaceae	Bu
Lindheimera	Ferdinand Lindheimer (1801–1879)	Asteraceae	St
Lindleya	John Lindley (1799–1865)	Rosaceae	Bu
Lindmania	Carl Axel Magnus Lindman (1856–1928)	Bromeliaceae	Bu
Lindsayomyrtus	Lindsay Stuart Smith (1917–1970)	Myrtaceae	Bu
Lingelsheimia	Alexander von Lingelsheim (1874–1937)	Phyllanthaceae	Bu
Linnaea	Carl Linnaeus (1707–1778)	Caprifoliaceae	Co
Linnaeosicyos	Carl Linnaeus (1707–1778)	Cucurbitaceae	Bu
Linzia	Johann Michael Linz (c. 1770 – 1855), German botanist, entomologist, royal secretary and tax supervisor in Speyer	Asteraceae	Bu
Lippia	Augustin Lippi (1678–1705)	Verbenaceae	St
Lipschitziella	Sergej Julievitsch Lipschitz (1905–1983), Russian botanist, bibliographer and historian in present-day Saint Petersburg	Asteraceae	Bu
Lipskya	Vladimir Lipsky (1863–1937)	Apiaceae	Bu
Lisaea	Domenico Lisa (1801–1867), Italian botanist, head gardener at a botanical garden in Turin	Apiaceae	Bu
Listia	Friedrich Ludwig List (b. 1799), Prussian botanist and teacher	Fabaceae	Bu
Littledalea	St. George Littledale (1851–1931)	Poaceae	Bu
Litwinowia	Dmitry Litvinov (1854–1929)	Brassicaceae	Bu
Livistona	Patrick Murray, Baron of Livingston, whose 17th-century garden stocked the Edinburgh Botanic Garden	Arecaceae	St
Llagunoa	Eugenio de Llaguno y Amírola (1724–1799), Spanish politician	Sapindaceae	Bu
Llerasia	Lleras, a supporter of natural science in New Granada (present-day Colombia)	Asteraceae	Bu
Lobelia	Matthias de l'Obel (1538–1616)	Campanulaceae	Co
Lockhartia	David Lockhart (1786–1846)	Orchidaceae	St
Lodoicea	Louis XV (1710–1774)	Arecaceae	St
Loefgrenianthus	Johan Albert Constantin Löfgren (1854–1918)	Orchidaceae	Bu
Loeflingia	Pehr Löfling (1729–1756)	Caryophyllaceae	Bu
Loeselia	Johannes Loesel (1607–1655), German doctor and botanist, professor of medicine in Königsberg (present-day Kaliningrad)	Polemoniaceae	St
Loeseliastrum	Johannes Loesel (1607–1655), German doctor and botanist, professor of medicine in Königsberg (present-day Kaliningrad)	Polemoniaceae	Bu
Loesenera	Ludwig Eduard Theodor Loesener (1865–1941)	Fabaceae	Bu
Loeseneriella	Ludwig Eduard Theodor Loesener (1865–1941)	Celastraceae	Bu
Loewia	Ernst Loew (1843–1908), German botanist and teacher	Passifloraceae	Bu
Logania	James Logan (1674–1751)	Loganiaceae	Ch
Loheria	August Loher (1874–1930), German pharmacist and botanist	Primulaceae	Bu
Longetia	François Achille Longet (1811–1871), anatomist	Picrodendraceae	Bu
Lonicera	Adam Lonicer (1528–1586)	Caprifoliaceae	Co
Lopezia	Tomás Lopez, Spanish botanist and writer c. 1540	Onagraceae	St
Lopriorea	Giuseppe Lopriore (1865–1928), Italian professor of botany at the institute of oenology in Catania and botanical garden director there; director of the agricultural research station in Modena	Amaranthaceae	Bu
Lorandersonia	Loran Crittenden Anderson (b. 1936), American botanist and plant taxonomist; professor at Florida State University; worked on Asteraceae and Cannabis	Asteraceae	Bu
Lordhowea	Ontong Java Atoll, formerly the Lord Howe Atoll in the Solomon Islands, named after Richard Howe, 1st Earl Howe (1726–1799)	Asteraceae	Bt
Lorentzianthus	Paul Günther Lorentz (1835–1881)	Eupatorieae	Bt
Lorenzia	Harri Lorenzi (b. 1949)	Araceae	Bt
Lorenzochloa	Lorenzo Raimundo Parodi (1895–1966)	Poaceae	Bt
Loudetia	Edward Loudet (1811–1867), German dentist and surgeon in Karlsruhe	Poaceae	Qu
Loudetiopsis	Edward Loudet (1811–1867), German dentist and surgeon in Karlsruhe	Poaceae	Qu
Louisiella	Jean Laurent Prosper Louis (1903–1947), Belgian botanist and professor of agronomy in Gembloux	Poaceae	Bu
Lourteigia	Alicia Lourteig (1913–2003)	Asteraceae	Bu
Lourtella	Alicia Lourteig (1913–2003)	Lythraceae	Bu
Lowia (Note: Lowiaceae, but not Lowia, is accepted at Plants of the World Online.)	Hugh Lowe (1824–1905), English colonial administrator and naturalist	Lowiaceae	Bu
Lozanella	José Filemón Guadalupe Lozano y Lozano (1877 – after 1940), Mexican traveling companion of Cyrus Pringle during his Mexican expedition	Cannabaceae	Bu
Lozania	Jorge Tadeo Lozano (1771–1816), politician	Lacistemataceae	Bu
Lucya	Rose Lucie (or Lucy) Dunal (1798–1827), sister of Michel Félix Dunal (1789–1856); investigated Rubiaceae in Montpellier	Rubiaceae	Bu
Ludovia	Maria Luisa of Parma (1751–1819) and her husband Charles IV of Spain (1748–1819)	Cyclanthaceae	Bu
Ludwigia	Christian Gottlieb Ludwig (1709–1773)	Onagraceae	Co
Lueckelia	Emil Lückel (b. 1927), German botanist and taxonomist from Frankfurt; specialist in orchids and president of the German Orchid Society	Orchidaceae	Bu
Lueddemannia	Gustav Adolf Lueddemann (1821–1884), German gardener in Paris, France; later had his own orchid nursery	Orchidaceae	Bu
Luehea	Carl Emil von der Luehe or Lühe (1751–1801), German botanist and chamberlain of Princess Caroline-Mathilde of Denmark; later a chamberlain in Vienna, Austria	Malvaceae	Bu
Lueheopsis	Carl Emil von der Luehe or Lühe (1751–1801), German botanist and chamberlain of Princess Caroline-Mathilde of Denmark; later a chamberlain in Vienna, Austria	Malvaceae	Bu
Luetkea	Friedrich Benjamin von Lütke (1797–1882)	Rosaceae	Bu
Luetzelburgia	Philipp von Luetzelburg (1880–1948), German pharmacist and botanist who traveled and collected in northeast Brazil	Fabaceae	Bu
Luisia	Luis de Torres (19th century), Spanish botanist	Orchidaceae	St
Lulia	Ángel Lulio Cabrera (1908–1999)	Asteraceae	Bu
Lumnitzera	István Lumnitzer (1750–1806), Hungarian doctor and botanist in present-day Bratislava, Slovakia	Combretaceae	Bu
Lunania	John Lunan (1771–1839)	Salicaceae	Bu
Lundellianthus	Cyrus Longworth Lundell (1907–1994)	Asteraceae	Bu
Lundia	Peter Wilhelm Lund (1801–1880)	Bignoniaceae	Bu
Lundinia	Roger Lundin (1955–2005), Swedish botanist at the natural history museum in Stockholm	Asteraceae	Bu
Lutheria	Harry Edward Luther (1952–2012), American botanist at the Marie Selby Botanical Gardens; specialist in Bromeliaceae	Bromeliaceae	Bu
Lutzia	Louis Charles Lutz (1871–1952), French pharmacist and botanist; professor with a focus on spore-bearing plants and microbiology in Paris	Brassicaceae	Bu
Luxemburgia	Charles Emmanuel Sigismond de Montmorency-Luxembourg (1774–1861), French duke of Piney-Luxembourg; botanical patron	Ochnaceae	Bu
Luzuriaga	Ignacio Maria Ruiz de Luzuriaga (1763–1822), Spanish doctor and botanist	Alstroemeriaceae	Bu
Lyallia	David Lyall (1817–1895)	Montiaceae	Bu
Lycoris	Volumnia Cytheris (fl. 1st century BC), Roman actress	Amaryllidaceae	St
Lymanbensonia	Lyman David Benson (1909–1993), American botanist, specialist in cactus	Cactaceae	Bu
Lymania	Lyman Bradford Smith (1904–1997)	Bromeliaceae	Bu
Lyonia	John Lyon (c. 1765 – c. 1816)	Ericaceae	St
Lyonothamnus	William Scrugham Lyon (1851–1916), American collector who sent specimens to Asa Gray	Rosaceae	Co
Lysakia	Martin A. Lysák (b.1973), Czech scientist and botanist	Brassicaceae	Bt
Lysimachia	probably Lysimachus (c. 360 BC – 281 BC), king	Primulaceae	Co
Maackia	Richard Maack (1825–1886)	Fabaceae	Co
Maasia	Paul Maas (b. 1939)	Annonaceae	Bu
Mabrya	Tom J. Mabry (1932–2015), American botanist and plant chemist and Professor at University of Texas at Austin	Plantaginaceae	Bt
Macadamia	John Macadam (1827–1865), Scottish chemist, medical doctor, lecturer, originally from Glasgow, emigrated to Australia	Proteaceae	St
Macairea	Isaac François Macaire, Swiss plant physiologist and chemist from Geneva	Melastomataceae	Bu
Macarthuria	William Macarthur (1800–1882)	Macarthuriaceae	Qu
Macbridea	James Macbride (1784–1817), American botanist and doctor in Charleston, South Carolina	Lamiaceae	Bu
Macbrideina	James Francis Macbride (1892–1976)	Rubiaceae	Bu
Macgregoria	John MacGregor (1828–1884), politician	Celastraceae	Bu
Mackaya	James Townsend Mackay (1775–1862)	Acanthaceae	St
Mackinlaya	John McKinlay (1819–1872)	Apiaceae	Bu
Maclaudia	Charles Maclaud (1866–1933), French doctor and zoologist; plant and animal collector	Apocynaceae	Bu
Macleania	John Maclean (1786–1857), Scottish merchant in Peru	Ericaceae	Ba
Macleaya	Alexander Macleay (1767–1848)	Papaveraceae	Co
Maclura	William Maclure (1763–1840)	Moraceae	Co
Maclurochloa	Floyd Alonzo McClure (1897–1970)	Poaceae	Bu
Maclurodendron	Floyd Alonzo McClure (1897–1970)	Rutaceae	Bu
Maclurolyra	Floyd Alonzo McClure (1897–1970)	Poaceae	Bu
Macphersonia	Pieter Daniël Eugenius MacPherson (1792–1846), politician, and Rose Marie Jeanne MacPherson, née van Meeuwen (1801–1889), noblewoman	Sapindaceae	Bu
Macrohasseltia	Johan Conrad van Hasselt (1797–1823)	Salicaceae	Bt
Macvaughiella	Rogers McVaugh (1909–2009)	Asteraceae	Bu
Magnolia	Pierre Magnol (1638–1715)	Magnoliaceae	Ch
Magonia	Mago Barca (243 BC – 203 BC), military officer	Sapindaceae	Bu
Maguireanthus	Bassett Maguire (1904–1991)	Melastomataceae	Qu
Maguireocharis	Bassett Maguire (1904–1991)	Rubiaceae	Qu
Maguireothamnus	Bassett Maguire (1904–1991)	Rubiaceae	Qu
Mahonia	Bernard McMahon (c. 1775 – 1816)	Berberidaceae	Co
Maillardia	Louis Gaspard Dominique Maillard (1780–1867), French engineer	Moraceae	Bu
Maingaya	Alexander Carroll Maingay (1836–1869)	Hamamelidaceae	Bu
Maireana	Joseph François Maire (1780–1867), Parisian plant collector who eventually gave his herbarium to Ernest Cosson	Amaranthaceae	Bu
Mairetis	René Maire (1878–1949)	Boraginaceae	Bu
Mairia	Louis Maire (d. 1885), German doctor and botanist who collected under the name of Mund and Maire	Asteraceae	Bu
Majidea	Majid bin Said of Zanzibar (c. 1834 – 1870)	Sapindaceae	Bu
Majovskya	Jozef Májovský, (1920–2012), Slovak botanist and Professor of Botany in Bratislava	Rosaceae	Bt
Malcolmia	William Malcolm (d. 1798), London nurseryman who published a plant catalogue in 1771. Previously Malcomia.	Brassicaceae	St
Malesherbia	Guillaume-Chrétien de Lamoignon de Malesherbes (1721–1794), government minister	Passifloraceae	Bu
Malmea	Gustaf Oskar Andersson Malme (1864–1937)	Annonaceae	Bu
Malmeanthus	Gustaf Oskar Andersson Malme (1864–1937)	Asteraceae	Bu
Malouetia	Pierre Victor, baron Malouet (1740–1814)	Apocynaceae	Bu
Malperia	Edward Palmer (1829–1911)	Asteraceae	Bu
Malpighia	Marcello Malpighi (1628–1694)	Malpighiaceae	Ch
Malpighiodes	Marcello Malpighi (1628–1694)	Malpighiaceae	Bu
Maltebrunia	Conrad Malte-Brun (1775–1826)	Poaceae	Bu
Mammilloydia, synonym of Mammillaria	Francis Ernest Lloyd (1868–1947)	Cactaceae	Bu
Mandevilla	Henry John Mandeville (1773–1861), British minister in Buenos Aires	Apocynaceae	Co
Mandirola	Agostino Mandirola (d. 1661), Italian clergyman, naturalist and botanist with a focus on medicinal plants and citrus	Gesneriaceae	Bu
Manekia	Erik Leonard Ekman (1883–1931)	Piperaceae	Bu
Manettia	Saverio Manetti (1723–1785)	Rubiaceae	St
Mangenotiella	Georges Marie Mangenot (1899–1985), French botanist and Professor of Botany	Primulaceae	Bt
Mankyua	Man Kyu Pak (1906–1988), South Korean researcher and botanist (Pteridology)	Ophioglossaceae	Bt
Mannagettaea	Günther Beck von Mannagetta und Lerchenau (1856–1931)	Orobanchaceae	Bu
Manniella	Gustav Mann (1836–1916)	Orchidaceae	Bu
Manniophyton	Gustav Mann (1836–1916)	Euphorbiaceae	Bu
Mansoa	Antônio Luiz Patrício da Silva Manso (1788–1848)	Bignoniaceae	Bu
Mansonia	Francis Bruce Manson (c. 1850 – 1908), plant collector in Burma (present-day Myanmar) with the Indian Forest Service	Malvaceae	Bu
Maoutia	Emmanuel Le Maout (1799–1877)	Urticaceae	Bu
Mappia	Marcus Mappus (1666–1736), French doctor and botanist from Alsace; son of Marc or Marcus Mappus (1632–1701)	Icacinaceae	Bu
Mappianthus	Marcus Mappus (1666–1736), French doctor and botanist from Alsace; son of Marc or Marcus Mappus (1632–1701)	Icacinaceae	Bu
Maranta	Bartolomeo Maranta (1500–1571)	Marantaceae	Ch
Marantochloa	Bartolomeo Maranta (1500–1571)	Marantaceae	Bu
Marcania	Alexander Marcan (1883–1953), English collector of plants in Southeast Asia and Thailand	Acanthaceae	Bu
Marcelliopsis	Claudia Marcella Major (fl. 1st century BC), Roman noblewoman	Amaranthaceae	Bu
Marcetella	Adeodato Francisco Marcet (1875–1964), Spanish clergyman, botanist and agronomist; worked in a botanical garden in Blanes	Rosaceae	Bu
Marcetia	François Marcet (1803–1883), Swiss doctor, physiologist, inventor, and professor of physics	Melastomataceae	Bu
Marcgravia	Georg Marcgrave (1610–1644)	Marcgraviaceae	Qu
Marcgraviastrum	Georg Marcgrave (1610–1644)	Marcgraviaceae	Bu
Maresia	Paul Marès (1826–1900), French botanist who explored in Algeria and the Balearic Islands	Brassicaceae	Bu
Mareya	Étienne-Jules Marey (1830–1904), scientist	Euphorbiaceae	Bu
Mareyopsis	Étienne-Jules Marey (1830–1904), scientist	Euphorbiaceae	Bu
Margaretta	Margaret Laurie Grant (1834–1918), wrote about plants collected by her husband James Augustus Grant (1827–1892) on an expedition to find the source of the Nile	Apocynaceae	Bu
Marianthus	Princess Marie von Metternich, Austrian botanical patron	Pittosporaceae	Bu
Marina	La Malinche (1505–1530), interpreter for the conquistador Hernán Cortés	Fabaceae	Bu
Mariosousa	Mario Sousa Sánchez (1940–2017), Mexican botanist and plant collector, director of the university herbarium in Mexico City	Fabaceae	Bu
Markea	Jean-Baptiste Lamarck (1744–1829)	Solanaceae	Bu
Markhamia	Clements Markham (1830–1916)	Bignoniaceae	Bu
Marlothiella	Rudolf Marloth (1855–1931)	Apiaceae	Bu
Marlothistella	Rudolf Marloth (1855–1931)	Aizoaceae	Bu
Marquesia	Agostinho Sessinando Marques (1847–1925), plant collector in Angola	Dipterocarpaceae	Bu
Marsdenia	William Marsden (1754–1836), orientalist	Apocynaceae	St
Marshallia	Humphry Marshall (1722–1803)	Asteraceae	St
Marshalljohnstonia	Marshall Conring Johnston (b. 1930)	Asteraceae	Bu
Marshallocereus	William Taylor Marshall (1886–1957), American botanist, botanical garden director in Phoenix, Arizona; specialist in cactus	Cactaceae	Bu
Martellidendron	Ugolino Martelli (1860–1934)	Pandanaceae	Bu
Martensianthus	Martin Martens (1797–1863)	Rubiaceae	Bu
Marthella	Martha Urban, née Kurtz (1854–1920), wife of Ignatz Urban (1848–1931)	Burmanniaceae	Bu
Martianthus	Carl Friedrich Philipp von Martius (1794–1868)	Lamiaceae	Bu
Marticorenia	Clodomiro Fidel Segundo Marticorena (1929–2013), Chilean botanist and pharmacist, professor in Concepción and elsewhere	Asteraceae	Bu
Martinella	Joseph Martin (d. 1826)	Bignoniaceae	Bu
Martiodendron	Carl Friedrich Philipp von Martius (1794–1868)	Fabaceae	Bu
Martretia	Vincent Martret (1875–1904), French botanist who was responsible for a botanical research garden in the Central African Republic	Phyllanthaceae	Bu
Martynia	John Martyn (1699–1768)	Martyniaceae	Ch
Mascagnia	Paolo Mascagni (1755–1815), anatomist	Malpighiaceae	Bu
Masdevallia	José Masdevall (d. 1801), Spanish physician and botanist	Orchidaceae	St
Massonia	Francis Masson (1741–1805)	Asparagaceae	Bu
Mastersia	Maxwell T. Masters (1833–1907)	Fabaceae	Bu
Mastersiella	Maxwell T. Masters (1833–1907)	Restionaceae	Bu
Mathewsia	Andrew Mathews (1801–1841), English gardener, plant collector in Chile and Peru	Brassicaceae	Bu
Mathiasella	Mildred Esther Mathias (1906–1995)	Apiaceae	Ba
Mathieua	Louis Mathieu (1793–1867), German gardener; a director of an institute of gardening in Berlin	Amaryllidaceae	Bu
Matisia	Francisco Javier Matís (1763–1851)	Malvaceae	Bu
Matsumurella	Jinzō Matsumura (1856–1928)	Lamiaceae	Bu
Mattfeldanthus	Johannes Mattfeld (1895–1951), German botanist at the botanical museum in Dahlem, Berlin	Asteraceae	Bu
Mattfeldia	Johannes Mattfeld (1895–1951), German botanist at the botanical museum in Dahlem, Berlin	Asteraceae	Bu
Matthaea	Matteo di San Giuseppe (1612–1691), Italian doctor, botanist, linguist, and missionary in Palestine, Mesopotamia, the Malabar region and Persia (present-day Iran)	Monimiaceae	Bu
Matthiola	Pietro Andrea Mattioli (c. 1500 – 1577)	Brassicaceae	Co
Mattiastrum	Elisabeth von Matt (1762–1814), astronomer	Boraginaceae	Bu
Matudaea	Eizi Matuda (1894–1978)	Hamamelidaceae	Qu
Matudanthus	Eizi Matuda (1894–1978)	Commelinaceae	Qu
Maundia	John Maund (1823–1858), English-born Australian doctor and analytical chemist; worked in water analysis; was a doctor in Melbourne	Maundiaceae	Bu
Maurandella	Catalina Pancratia Maurandy, wife and colleague of Agostin Juan y Poveda (1770–1854), professor of botany and botanical garden director in Cartagena, Colombia	Plantaginaceae	Bu
Maurandya	Catalina Pancratia Maurandy, wife and colleague of Agostin Juan y Poveda (1770–1854), professor of botany and botanical garden director in Cartagena, Colombia	Plantaginaceae	Co
Mauria	Ernesto Mauri (1791–1836), Italian botanist and mycologist; professor of botany and botanical garden director in Rome	Anacardiaceae	Bu
Mauritiella	John Maurice, Prince of Nassau-Siegen (1604–1679)	Arecaceae	Bu
Maurocenia	Giovanni Francesco Morosini or Maurocenius (1658–1739), Venetian senator, botanical patron; had a large garden built up in Padua	Celastraceae	Bu
Maxburretia	Max Burret (1883–1964)	Arecaceae	Bu
Maxwellia	Maxwell T. Masters (1833–1907)	Malvaceae	Bu
Mayodendron	Richard Bourke, 6th Earl of Mayo (1822–1872)	Bignoniaceae	Bu
Mazaea	Manuel Gómez de la Maza y Jiménez (1867–1916), Cuban doctor; professor and director of the university botanical garden in Havana	Rubiaceae	Bu
Mcvaughia	Rogers McVaugh (1909–2009)	Malpighiaceae	Bu
Mecardonia	Antoni de Meca-Caçador-Cardona (1726–1788), 4th Marquess of Ciutadilla, Spanish botanist or enthusiast; donated lands to the city of Barcelona for a botanical garden	Plantaginaceae	Bu
Mechowia	Friedrich Wilhelm Alexander von Mechow (1831–1890)	Amaranthaceae	Bu
Medinilla	José de Medinilla, governor of Mauritius (c. 1820)	Melastomataceae	St
Medranoa	Francisco González Medrano (1939–2017), Mexican botanist	Asteraceae	Bt
Meeboldia	Alfred Meebold (1863–1952)	Apiaceae	Bu
Meehania	Thomas Meehan (1826–1901)	Lamiaceae	Bu
Megacorax	Peter H. Raven (b. 1936)	Onagraceae	Bu
Meineckia	Johann Ludwig Georg Meinecke (1721–1823), German physicist, biologist and teacher; professor of technology in Halle	Phyllanthaceae	Bu
Meistera	George Meister (1653–1713), German botanist and court gardener in Dresden for the Electorate of Saxony; also worked as a gardener in Japan	Zingiberaceae	Bu
Mellera	Charles James Meller (c. 1835 – 1869), English doctor, botanist and naturalist; joined one of David Livingstone's African expeditions	Acanthaceae	Bu
Melliniella	Adolf Mellin (c. 1873 – c. 1910), German botanist; collected plants in present-day Togo	Fabaceae	Bu
Mendoncia	José Francisco Miguel António de Mendonça (1725–1818), Roman Catholic cardinal	Acanthaceae	Bu
Menkea	Karl Theodor Menke (1791–1861)	Brassicaceae	Bu
Menonvillea	Nicolas-Joseph Thiéry de Menonville (1739–1780)	Brassicaceae	Bu
Mentzelia	Christian Mentzel (1622–1701), German doctor, botanist and sinologist	Loasaceae	Co
Merciera	Marie Philippe Mercier (1781–1831), French botanist; plant collector in Geneva	Campanulaceae	Bu
Meriania	Maria Sibylla Merian (1647–1717)	Melastomataceae	Bu
Merremia	Blasius Merrem (1761–1824)	Convolvulaceae	St
Merrilliodendron	Elmer Drew Merrill (1876–1956)	Icacinaceae	Bu
Merrilliopanax	Elmer Drew Merrill (1876–1956)	Araliaceae	Bu
Merrittia	Melvin Leroy Merritt (1879–1961), American forester for the Philippine Bureau of Forestry and the US Forest Service	Asteraceae	Bu
Mertensia	Franz Carl Mertens (1764–1831)	Boraginaceae	Co
Merwilla	Frederick Ziervogel Van der Merwe (1894–1968), South African doctor, botanist, and school inspector	Asparagaceae	Bu
Merxmuellera	Hermann Merxmüller (1920–1988)	Poaceae	Qu
Mesua	Masawaiyh (c. 777 – c. 857)	Calophyllaceae	Bu
Metasequoia	Sequoyah (c. 1770 – 1843), Cherokee linguist	Cupressaceae	Co
Metcalfia	Charles Russell Metcalfe (1904–1991), British researcher, botanist and plant anatomist; director of the Jodrell Laboratory at Kew Gardens	Poaceae	Bu
Metrodorea	Metrodorus (c. 1st century BC), student of a healer named Sabinus	Rutaceae	Bu
Metteniusa	Georg Heinrich Mettenius (1823–1866)	Metteniusaceae	Bu
Metternichia	Klemens von Metternich (1773–1859), diplomat	Solanaceae	Bu
Mexianthus	Ynes Mexia (1870–1938)	Asteraceae	Bu
Meyerophytum	Louis Gottlieb Meyer (1867–1958), German clergyman, explorer, and botanical researcher	Aizoaceae	Bu
Mezia	Carl Christian Mez (1866–1944)	Malpighiaceae	Bu
Mezilaurus	Carl Christian Mez (1866–1944)	Lauraceae	Bu
Mezzettia	Ignazio Mezzetti (1820–1876), Italian clergyman and teacher of natural science in Lucca und Rome	Annonaceae	Bu
Michauxia	André Michaux (1746–1802)	Campanulaceae	St
Michelsonia	Alexandr Alexandrovich Michelson or Mikhelson (1907–1973), Russian-born Belgian agricultural engineer and botanist; director of the forestry service	Fabaceae	Bu
Micholitzia	Wilhelm Micholitz (1854–1932)	Apocynaceae	Bu
Mickelia	John Thomas Mickel (b.1934) American botanist and pteridologist	Dryopteridaceae	Bt
Micklethwaitia	John Patrick Micklethwait Brenan (1917–1985)	Fabaceae	Bu
Miconia	Francisco Mico (b. 1528), Spanish botanist	Melastomataceae	St
Miersia	John Miers (1789–1879)	Amaryllidaceae	Bu
Miersiella	John Miers (1789–1879)	Burmanniaceae	Bu
Mikania	Joseph Gottfried Mikan (1743–1814)	Asteraceae	St
Mikaniopsis	Joseph Gottfried Mikan (1743–1814)	Asteraceae	Bu
Mildbraedia	Johannes Mildbraed (1879–1954)	Euphorbiaceae	Bu
Mildbraediodendron	Johannes Mildbraed (1879–1954)	Fabaceae	Bu
Milicia	Milici (19th and 20th centuries), administrator in Portuguese East Africa (in modern-day Mozambique) who supported the work of the author of the genus, Thomas Robertson Sim	Moraceae	Bu
Miliusa	Pierre Bernard Milius (1773–1829), French naval officer; joined the expedition of Nicolas Baudin	Annonaceae	Bu
Milla	Julian Milla, gardener to the Spanish king (18th century)	Asparagaceae	St
Milleria	Philip Miller (1691–1771)	Asteraceae	Bu
Millettia	Charles Millett (1792–1873), English merchant and plant collector; worked for the East India Company in the tea trade	Fabaceae	Ba
Milligania	Joseph Milligan (1807–1884), Scottish doctor and botanist, also a geologist; worked as a doctor for the Van Diemen's Land Company	Asteliaceae	Bu
Millingtonia	Thomas Millington (1628–1704)	Bignoniaceae	Bu
Millotia	possibly Claude-François-Xavier Millot (1726–1785), historian	Asteraceae	Bu
Miltonia	Charles Wentworth-Fitzwilliam, 5th Earl Fitzwilliam (1786–1857), Viscount Milton	Orchidaceae	St
Miltoniopsis	Charles Wentworth-Fitzwilliam, 5th Earl Fitzwilliam (1786–1857), Viscount Milton	Orchidaceae	Ba
Minuartia	Juan Minuart (1693–1768), Spanish botanist	Caryophyllaceae	St
Miquelia	Friedrich Anton Wilhelm Miquel (1811–1871)	Icacinaceae	Bu
Miqueliopuntia	Friedrich Anton Wilhelm Miquel (1811–1871)	Cactaceae	Bu
Mirandea	Faustino Miranda Gonzalez (1905–1964), Spanish-born Mexican botanist	Acanthaceae	Bu
Mirbelia	Charles-François Brisseau de Mirbel (1776–1854)	Fabaceae	Bu
Misbrookea	Winifred Mary Adelaide Brooke (1894–1975)	Asteraceae	Bu
Mitchella	John Mitchell (1711–1768)	Rubiaceae	Co
Mnesithea	Mnesitheus (4th century BC), doctor	Poaceae	Bu
Mocquerysia	Albert Mocquerys (1860–1926), French dentist; also an entomologist, naturalist and explorer; collected plants and insects in Africa and Venezuela	Salicaceae	Bu
Moenchia	Conrad Moench (1744–1805)	Caryophyllaceae	Qu
Moldenhawera	Johann Jacob Paul Moldenhawer (1766–1827)	Fabaceae	Bu
Molinadendron	José Antonio Molina Rosito (1926–2012)	Hamamelidaceae	Bu
Molinaea	Jean Desmoulins or Johannes Molinaeus (1530–1622), French doctor and botanist, student of Jacques Daléchamps and Guillaume Rondelet	Sapindaceae	Bu
Molineriella	Ignazio Bernardo Molineri (1741–1818), Italian head gardener at a botanical garden in Turin	Poaceae	Bu
Molinia	Juan Ignacio Molina (1740–1829)	Poaceae	Ba
Moliniopsis	Juan Ignacio Molina (1740–1829)	Poaceae	Bu
Mollia	Karl von Moll (1760–1838)	Malvaceae	Bu
Mollinedia	Francisco de Mollinedo (18th century), Spanish naturalist who contributed to a botanical garden in Madrid	Monimiaceae	Bu
Moltkia	Joachim Godske Moltke (1746–1818), statesman	Boraginaceae	St
Moltkiopsis	Joachim Godske Moltke (1746–1818), statesman	Boraginaceae	Bu
Monarda	Nicolás Monardes (c. 1493 – 1588)	Lamiaceae	Co
Monardella	Nicolás Monardes (c. 1493 – 1588)	Lamiaceae	St
Monimia	Monime (d. 71 BC), noblewoman	Monimiaceae	Bu
Monnina	José Moñino, 1st Count of Floridablanca (1728–1808)	Polygalaceae	Bu
Monrosia	Francisco de Asis Monrós (1922–1958), Argentinian agricultural engineer who discovered this plant's fruit	Polygalaceae	Bu
Monsonia	Lady Anne Monson (1726–1776)	Geraniaceae	St
Montanoa	Luis José Ignacio Montaña (1755–1820), Mexican naturalist and physician	Asteraceae	St
Monteiroa	Honório da Costa Monteiro Filho (1900–1978), Brazilian professor of botany and director of the national school of agriculture in Rio de Janeiro; specialist in Malvaceae	Malvaceae	Bu
Montia	Giuseppe Monti (1682–1760)	Montiaceae	Ch
Montinia	Lars Jonasson Montin (1723–1785), Swedish botanist and doctor in Lund and Halland; maintained a large herbarium; student of Carl Linnaeus	Montiniaceae	Bu
Montiopsis	Giuseppe Monti (1682–1760)	Montiaceae	Bu
Montrichardia	Gabriel de Montrichard, resident of Trinidad; friend of the author of the genus, Hermann Crüger	Araceae	Bu
Montrouziera	Xavier Montrouzier (1820–1897)	Clusiaceae	Bu
Monttea	Manuel Montt (1809–1880), president of Chile	Plantaginaceae	Bu
Moonia	Alexander Moon (1755–1825), Scottish gardener and botanist at Kew Gardens, collected in Gibraltar and North Africa	Asteraceae	Bu
Moquinia	Alfred Moquin-Tandon (1804–1863)	Asteraceae	Qu
Moquiniastrum	Alfred Moquin-Tandon (1804–1863)	Asteraceae	Bu
Moquiniella	Alfred Moquin-Tandon (1804–1863)	Loranthaceae	Qu
Moraea	Robert More (1703–1780), English botanist	Iridaceae	St
Morangaya	Reid Venable Moran (1916–2010), Edward G. Gay (1916–1997) and Betty Gay (b. 1919)	Cactaceae	Bu
Morelia	Morel (d. 1824), French plant collector who died in Senegal	Rubiaceae	Bu
Morelotia	Simon Morelot (1751–1809), French apothecary, member and professor at the college of pharmacy	Cyperaceae	Bu
Morettia	Giuseppe Moretti (1782–1853)	Brassicaceae	Bu
Moricandia	Stefano Moricand (1779–1854)	Brassicaceae	St
Moriera	James Justinian Morier (c. 1780 – 1849), diplomat and author	Brassicaceae	Bu
Morina	Louis Morin (1635–1715), French botanist	Caprifoliaceae	Co
Morisia	Giuseppe Giacinto Moris (1796–1869)	Brassicaceae	St
Morisonia	Robert Morison (1620–1683)	Capparaceae	St
Morithamnus	Scott Alan Mori	Asteraceae	Bu
Moritzia	Alexander Moritzi (1806–1850)	Boraginaceae	Bu
Morkillia	William Lucius Morkill (1858–1936), general manager of the Mexican national railroad	Zygophyllaceae	Bu
Morronea	Osvaldo Morrone (1957–2011), Argentinian botanist and former director of the Instituto de Botánica Darwinion in San Isidro	Poaceae	Bt
Morsacanthus	Walter Baptist Mors (1920–2008), Brazilian chemist who researched useful plants	Acanthaceae	Bu
Mortonia	Samuel George Morton (1799–1851)	Celastraceae	Bu
Mortoniella	Conrad Vernon Morton (1905–1972)	Apocynaceae	Bu
Mortoniodendron	Conrad Vernon Morton (1905–1972)	Malvaceae	Bu
Mosannona	Paul Maas (b. 1939)	Annonaceae	Bu
Mosiera	Charles A. Mosier (1871–1936), American botanist; a co-writer with the author of the genus, John Kunkel Small	Myrtaceae	Bu
Mossia	Charles Edward Moss (1870–1930)	Aizoaceae	Bu
Mostuea	Jens Vahl (1796–1854)	Gelsemiaceae	Bu
Motherwellia	James Bridgeham Motherwell (c. 1815 – 1886), Irish-born Australian doctor	Araliaceae	Bu
Motleyia	James Motley (1822–1859)	Rubiaceae	Bu
Motleyothamnus	Timothy 'Tim' J. Motley (1966–2013), American botanist, Professor of Botany at the Old Dominion University and Director of the Botanical Garden in Norfolk, Virginia	Rubiaceae	Bt
Moultonianthus	John Coney Moulton (1886–1926)	Euphorbiaceae	Bu
Mouretia	Marcellin Mouret (1881–1915), French botanist and soldier in Vietnam and Morocco	Rubiaceae	Bu
Moussonia	Albert Mousson (1805–1890)	Gesneriaceae	Bu
Muehlbergella	Friedrich Mühlberg (1840–1915)	Campanulaceae	Bu
Muehlenbeckia	Heinrich Gustav Mühlenbeck (1798–1845)	Polygonaceae	Co
Muellera	Otto Friedrich Müller (1730–1784)	Fabaceae	Bu
Muelleranthus	Ferdinand von Mueller (1825–1896)	Fabaceae	Bu
Muellerargia	Johannes Müller Argoviensis (1828–1896)	Cucurbitaceae	Bu
Muellerina	Ferdinand von Mueller (1825–1896)	Loranthaceae	Bu
Muhlenbergia	Gotthilf Heinrich Ernst Muhlenberg (1753–1815)	Poaceae	St
Muiria	John Muir (1874–1947)	Aizoaceae	Bu
Muiriantha	Thomas Muir (b. 1899), rancher in Western Australia who collected plants and accompanied the author of the genus, Charles Gardner	Rutaceae	Bu
Mulguraea	María E. Múlgura (b. 1943), Argentinian botanist; curator and professor at the Instituto de Botánica Darwinion; specialist in Junellia	Verbenaceae	Bu
Mullerochloa	Lennox Muller (born 1932), gardener and bamboo importer in Innisfail, Queensland, Australia	Poaceae	Bu
Mummenhoffia	Klaus Mummenhoff (b.1956), German botanist, specialist in Brassicaceae and Professor at the Osnabrück University	Brassicaceae	Bt
Munnozia	Juan Bautista Muñoz (1745–1799)	Asteraceae	Bu
Munroa	William Munro (1818–1880)	Poaceae	Qu
Munronia	William Munro (1818–1880)	Meliaceae	Qu
Muntingia	Abraham Munting (1626–1683)	Muntingiaceae	Bu
Munzothamnus	Philip A. Munz (1892–1974)	Asteraceae	Bu
Muraltia	Johannes von Muralt (1645–1733), Swiss botanist and doctor in Zürich, professor of physics	Polygalaceae	Bu
Murbeckiella	Svante Samuel Murbeck (1859–1946)	Brassicaceae	Bu
Murdannia	Aly Murdann, Indian plant collector; supervised a herbarium in Saharanpur	Commelinaceae	Bu
Murraya	Johan Andreas Murray (1740–1791)	Rutaceae	St
Muschleria	Reinhold Conrad Muschler (1882–1957)	Asteraceae	Bu
Musella	Antonius Musa (63 BC – 14)	Musaceae	Bu
Musgravea	Anthony Musgrave (1828–1888), colonial administrator	Proteaceae	Bu
Musschia	Jean Henri Mussche (1765–1834), Belgian gardener, curator at a botanical garden in Ghent	Campanulaceae	Bu
Mutisia	José Celestino Mutis (1732–1808)	Asteraceae	St
Mwasumbia	Leonard B. Mwasumbi (b.1938), Tanzanian botanist, plant taxonomist, specialist in Tanzanian flora, and head of the Herbarium at the University of Dar es Salaam	Annonaceae	Bt
Nanuza	Nanuza Luiza de Menezes (b. 1934), Brazilian botanist; curator and professor at the University of São Paulo	Velloziaceae	Bu
Napoleonaea	Napoleon (1769–1821), emperor	Lecythidaceae	Bu
Nashia	George Valentine Nash (1864–1921)	Verbenaceae	Bu
Nassauvia	Karl Heinrich von Nassau-Siegen (1743–1808), naval officer and explorer	Asteraceae	Bu
Nathaliella	Nathalie A. Desjatova-Shostenko (1889–1969)	Scrophulariaceae	Bu
Naudinia	Charles Victor Naudin (1815–1899)	Rutaceae	Bu
Navarretia	Francisco Fernandez de Navarrete (d. 1742), Spanish personal physician and professor of medicine in Granada	Polemoniaceae	Bu
Navia	Bernhard Sebastian von Nau (1766–1845), German naturalist, professor of natural history in Mainz; later active as a (political) administrator	Bromeliaceae	Bu
Nayariophyton	Madhavan Parameswarau Nayar (1905–1978)	Malvaceae	Bu
Nealchornea	Stanesby Alchorne (1727–1800), English botanist at the Chelsea Physic Garden	Euphorbiaceae	Bu
Nectouxia	Hippolyte Nectoux (1759–1836), French botanist, botanical garden director in Santo Domingo; head gardener in Fontainebleau; founded a botanical garden in Rome	Solanaceae	Bu
Neea	Luis Née (1734–1807)	Nyctaginaceae	Bu
Needhamiella	John Needham (1713–1781)	Ericaceae	Bu
Neeopsis	Luis Née (1734–1807)	Nyctaginaceae	Bu
Neesenbeckia	Christian Gottfried Daniel Nees von Esenbeck (1776–1858)	Cyperaceae	Bu
Neesia	Theodor Friedrich Ludwig Nees von Esenbeck (1787–1837)	Malvaceae	Bu
Neesiochloa	Christian Gottfried Daniel Nees von Esenbeck (1776–1858)	Poaceae	Bu
Negria	Cristoforo Negri (1809–1896)	Gesneriaceae	Bu
Neillia	Patrick Neill (1776–1851)	Rosaceae	Co
Nelia	Gert Cornelius Nel (1885–1950)	Aizoaceae	Bu
Nelmesia	Ernest Nelmes (1895–1959), English botanist, gardener and librarian; worked at Kew Gardens in the herbarium and library; specialist in Carex and Cyperaceae	Cyperaceae	Bu
Nelsia	Louis Nels (1855–1910), colonial administrator	Amaranthaceae	Bu
Nelsonia	David Nelson (c. 1740 – 1789)	Acanthaceae	Bu
Nelsonianthus	Edward William Nelson (1855–1934)	Asteraceae	Bu
Neobaclea	César Hipólito Bacle (1794–1838), Swiss naturalist, lithographer and periodicals publisher; collected plants, animals, minerals and cultural materials in South America and elsewhere	Malvaceae	Bu
Neobassia	Ferdinando Bassi (1710–1774), Italian botanist	Amaranthaceae	Bu
Neobathiea	Joseph Marie Henry Alfred Perrier de la Bâthie (1873–1958)	Orchidaceae	Bu
Neobeguea	Louis Henri Bégué (1906–1979), French civil servant in the forestry service in Madagascar	Meliaceae	Bu
Neobertiera	Bertier, a French Guianese woman who helped Jean Baptiste Christophore Fusée Aublet with native plants, including this genus, found on her property	Rubiaceae	Bu
Neoblakea	Sidney Fay Blake (1892–1959)	Rubiaceae	Qu
Neobolusia	Harry Bolus (1834–1911)	Orchidaceae	Bu
Neobouteloua	Claudio Boutelou (1774–1842), Spanish gardener and botanist, and his brother Esteban Boutelou (1776–1813), botanist and agronomist	Poaceae	Bu
Neoboutonia	Louis Bouton (1800–1878), French-Mauritian botanist in Port Louis, Mauritius	Euphorbiaceae	Bu
Neobracea	Lewis Jones Knight Brace (1852–1938), English botanist; collected plants in the Bahamas; worked at a botanical garden in Kolkata in West Bengal	Apocynaceae	Bu
Neobrittonia	Nathaniel Lord Britton (1859–1934)	Malvaceae	Bu
Neobuchia	Wilhelm Buch (1862–1943), German pharmacist and botanist, and his wife Amalia Pauline Wilhelmine Buch (c. 1867–1900)	Malvaceae	Bu
Neochevalierodendron	Auguste Chevalier (1873–1956)	Fabaceae	Bu
Neocogniauxia	Alfred Cogniaux (1841–1916)	Orchidaceae	Bu
Neocollettia	Henry Collett (1836–1901)	Fabaceae	Bu
Neocuatrecasia	José Cuatrecasas (1903–1996)	Asteraceae	Bu
Neocussonia	Pierre Cusson (1727–1783)	Araliaceae	Bu
Neodillenia	Johann Jacob Dillenius (1684–1747)	Dilleniaceae	Bu
Neodriessenia	Peter van Driessen (1753–1828), Dutch doctor, pharmacist, chemist and botanist; professor of medicine in Harderwijk und Groningen	Melastomataceae	Bu
Neofabricia	Philipp Conrad Fabricius (1714–1774), German doctor and professor of botany in Helmstedt	Myrtaceae	Bu
Neogardneria	George Gardner (1810–1849)	Orchidaceae	Bu
Neogaya	Jaques Étienne Gay (1786–1864)	Apiaceae	Bu
Neoglaziovia	Auguste François Marie Glaziou (1828–1906)	Bromeliaceae	St
Neogoezia	Edmund Goeze (1838–1929), German gardener and botanist; botanical museum director in Coimbra, Portugal; botanical garden inspector in Greifswald	Apiaceae	Bu
Neogontscharovia	Nikolái Gontscharow (1900–1942), Russian botanist and collector	Plumbaginaceae	Bu
Neoguillauminia	André Guillaumin (1885–1974)	Euphorbiaceae	Bu
Neoharmsia	Hermann Harms (1870–1942)	Fabaceae	Bu
Neohemsleya	James Hatton Hemsley (b. 1923), English botanist at Kew Gardens; specialist in African Sapotaceae	Sapotaceae	Bu
Neohenricia	Margaret Gertrude Anna Henrici (1892–1971), Swiss-born South African botanist and physiologist	Aizoaceae	Bu
Neoholmgrenia	Patricia Kern Holmgren (b. 1940), Noel Herman Holmgren (b. 1937), and Arthur Herman Holmgren (1912–1992)	Onagraceae	Bu
Neohouzeaua	Jean Houzeau de Lehaie (1867–1959),	(Poaceae	Bt
Neojeffreya	Charles Jeffrey (b. 1934), English botanist at Kew Gardens and in Saint Petersburg in Russia; specialist in Asteraceae and Cucurbitaceae	Asteraceae	Bu
Neojobertia	Clément Léger Nicolas Jobert (1840–1910), plant collector in Brazil	Bignoniaceae	Bu
Neokochia	Wilhelm Daniel Joseph Koch (1771–1849), German doctor and botanist; professor of medicine and botany in Erlangen, and botanical garden director there	Amaranthaceae	Bu
Neolamarckia	Jean-Baptiste Lamarck (1744–1829)	Rubiaceae	Bu
Neolemonniera	George Le Monnier (1843–1931), French botanist and mycologist; professor of botany in Nancy	Sapotaceae	Bu
Neolloydia	Francis Ernest Lloyd (1868–1947)	Cactaceae	St
Neoluederitzia	Franz Adolf Eduard Lüderitz (1834–1896), German merchant involved in the creation of German South West Africa (now Namibia); namesake of Lüderitz Bay	Zygophyllaceae	Qu
Neomezia	Carl Christian Mez (1866–1944)	Primulaceae	Bu
Neomillspaughia	Charles Frederick Millspaugh (1854–1923), American doctor and botanist; professor of medical botany in Chicago	Polygonaceae	Bu
Neomirandea	Faustino Miranda Gonzalez (1905–1964), Spanish-born Mexican botanist	Asteraceae	Bu
Neomoorea	Frederick William Moore (1857–1949)	Orchidaceae	Bu
Neomortonia	Conrad Vernon Morton (1905–1972)	Gesneriaceae	Bu
Neonelsonia	Edward William Nelson (1855–1934)	Apiaceae	Bu
Neonicholsonia	George Nicholson (1847–1908)	Arecaceae	Bu
Neonotonia	Benjamin Noton (1784–1869), English mint director in present-day Mumbai with an interest in natural science; collected in southern India	Fabaceae	Bu
Neopallasia	Peter Simon Pallas (1741–1811)	Asteraceae	Bu
Neoparrya	Charles Christopher Parry (1823–1890)	Apiaceae	Bu
Neopringlea	Cyrus Pringle (1838–1911)	Salicaceae	Bu
Neoraimondia	Antonio Raimondi (1826–1890)	Cactaceae	Bu
Neorautanenia	Martti Rautanen (1845–1926)	Fabaceae	Bu
Neoregelia	Eduard August von Regel (1815–1892)	Bromeliaceae	St
Neoregnellia	Anders Fredrik Regnell (1807–1884)	Malvaceae	Bu
Neoroepera	Johannes August Christian Roeper (1801–1885), German doctor and botanist; professor of botany in Basel and in Rostock; later also the university librarian at Rostock	Picrodendraceae	Bu
Neorudolphia	Karl Rudolphi (1771–1832)	Fabaceae	Bu
Neoschmidia	Maurice Schmid (1922–2018), French botanist in Africa, Southeast Asia and New Caledonia; specialist in the flora of New Caledonia; then at the National Museum of Natural History in Paris	Rutaceae	Bu
Neoschumannia	Karl Moritz Schumann (1851–1904)	Apocynaceae	Bu
Neoscortechinia	Benedetto Scortechini (1845–1886)	Euphorbiaceae	Bu
Neosprucea	Richard Spruce (1817–1893)	Salicaceae	Bu
Neostapfia	Otto Stapf (1857–1933)	Poaceae	Bu
Neostapfiella	Otto Stapf (1857–1933)	Poaceae	Bu
Neotatea	George Henry Hamilton Tate (1894–1953)	Bonnetiaceae	Bu
Neotessmannia	Günther Tessmann (1884–1969), German-Brazilian ethnologist and botanist; explorer and plant collector in western tropical Africa; worked at the Paranaense Museum in Curitiba	Muntingiaceae	Bu
Neothorelia	Clovis Thorel (1833–1911)	Capparaceae	Bu
Neotinea	Vincenzo Tineo (1791–1856)	Orchidaceae	Bu
Neotysonia	Isaac Tyson (1859–1942), plant collector in Western Australia	Asteraceae	Bu
Neoveitchia	John Veitch (1752–1839)	Arecaceae	Bu
Neowerdermannia	Erich Werdermann (1892–1959)	Cactaceae	Bu
Nepsera	Fridolin Karl Leopold Spenner (1798–1841), German doctor and botanist; director of the university botanical garden in Freiburg and professor of medical botany there	Melastomataceae	Bu
Neraudia	Jules Néraud (1794–1855)	Urticaceae	Bu
Nernstia	Walther Hermann Nernst (1864–1941), German chemist	Rubiaceae	Bt
Neslia	Jacques Amable Nicolas Denesle (1735–1819), French botanist in Liège und Caen; later a teacher of natural science and a botanical garden director in Poitiers	Brassicaceae	Bu
Nesomia	Guy L. Nesom (b. 1945)	Asteraceae	Bu
Nestlera	Chrétien Géofroy Nestler (1778–1832)	Asteraceae	Qu
Neuburgia	Christophorus (Christoffel) Thun von Neuburg (Thum-Neuburg); built up a botanical garden in Swabia in Germany	Loganiaceae	Bu
Neuwiedia	Prince Maximilian of Wied-Neuwied (1782–1867)	Orchidaceae	Bu
Nevillea	Neville Stuart Pillans (1884–1964), South African botanist at the Bolus Herbarium in Cape Town	Restionaceae	Bu
Neviusia	Ruben Denton Nevius (1827–1913), the plant's discoverer	Rosaceae	St
Newbouldia	William Williamson Newbould (1819–1886), British clergyman in Kew and elsewhere; also a botanist and collector	Bignoniaceae	Bu
Newcastelia	Henry Pelham-Clinton, 5th Duke of Newcastle (1811–1864)	Lamiaceae	Bu
Newmania	Mark Fleming Newman (b. 1959), British botanist at a botanical garden in Edinburgh, specialist in Zingiberaceae	Zingiberaceae	Bu
Newtonia	Isaac Newton (1642–1727)	Fabaceae	Bu
Neyraudia	Auguste Adolphe Marc Reynaud (1804–1867)	Poaceae	Bu
Nicandra	Nicander	Loganiaceae	Co
Nichallea	Nicolas Hallé, French botanist at the National Museum of Natural History; specialist in Rubiaceae	Rubiaceae	Bu
Nicolasia	N. E. Brown (1849–1934)	Asteraceae	Bu
Nicolletia	Joseph Nicollet (1786–1843)	Asteraceae	Bu
Nicotiana	Jean Nicot (1530–1604), diplomat	Solanaceae	Co
Niedenzuella	Franz Josef Niedenzu (1857–1937)	Malpighiaceae	Bu
Niemeyera	Felix von Niemeyer (1820–1871), doctor	Sapotaceae	Bu
Nierembergia	Juan Eusebio Nieremberg (1595–1658)	Solanaceae	Co
Nietneria	Eduard I. Nietner (1796–1859), German royal court gardener in Berlin and Potsdam; took a position at the royal institute for gardening education	Nartheciaceae	Bu
Nissolia	Guillaume Nissole (1647–1735), French botanist, historian of science and doctor in Montpellier; identified plants for the French Academy of Sciences in Paris and Montpellier	Fabaceae	Bu
Nivellea	Robert Nivelle (1856–1924), military officer	Asteraceae	Bu
Nivenia	James Niven (1774–1826), Scottish botanist	Iridaceae	St
Noaea	François Thomas "Frank", Marquis De Noé (1806–1887) French author on North African Lamiaceae	Amaranthaceae	Bu
Noccaea	Domenico Nocca (1758–1841), Italian clergyman and botanist; director of botanical gardens in Mantua and Pavia; professor of botany in Pavia	Brassicaceae	Bu
Noccaeopsis	Domenico Nocca (1758–1841), Italian clergyman and botanist; director of botanical gardens in Mantua and Pavia; professor of botany in Pavia	Brassicaceae	Bu
Nohawilliamsia	Norris Hagan Williams (b. 1943), American botanist, specialist in orchids; curator and professor of botany at the Florida Museum of Natural History	Orchidaceae	Bu
Noisettia	Louis Claude Noisette (1772–1849)	Violaceae	Bu
Nolina	Abbé Pierre Charles Nolin (1717–1795), French botanist and writer	Asparagaceae	St
Nolletia	Jean-Antoine Nollet (1700–1770), physicist	Asteraceae	Bu
Noltea	Ernst Ferdinand Nolte (1791–1875)	Rhamnaceae	St
Nonea	Johann Philipp Nonne (1729–1772), German doctor and botanist; professor of medicine in Erfurt	Boraginaceae	Bu
Nordenstamia	Bertil Nordenstam (b. 1936)	Asteraceae	Bu
Normanbya	George Phipps, 2nd Marquess of Normanby (1819–1890)	Arecaceae	Bu
Normandia	Sébastien René Lenormand (1796–1871)	Rubiaceae	Bu
Normeyera	Norbert Meyer (1954– ), German botanist, specialist in Sorbus in central Europe and curator of the Herbarium at Natural History Museum in Nuremberg	Rosaceae	Bt
Normandiodendron	Didier Normand (1908–2002), research director for tropical forests in Nogent-sur-Marne, France; specialist in tropical wood	Fabaceae	Bu
Noronhia	Francisco Noronha (c. 1748–1788)	Oleaceae	Bu
Norrisia	William Norris (1793–1859), judge and justice	Loganiaceae	Bu
Northia	Marianne North (1830–1890)	Sapotaceae	Bu
Nouelia	André Edmé Nouel (1801–1887), French mathematician and scientist at the Collège royal in Orléans; director of the natural history museum there	Asteraceae	Bu
Nouhuysia	Jan Willem van Nouhuys (1869–1963), Dutch naval officer and seafarer; collected plants in New Guinea; director at two museums in Rotterdam	Clusiaceae	Bu
Noveloa	Luis Alejandro Novelo Retana (1951–2006), Mexican botanist at the University of Mexico; specialist in native aquatic plants and Podostemaceae of the neotropics	Podostemaceae	Bu
Nowickea	Joan W. Nowicke (b. 1938)	Phytolaccaceae	Qu
Nuttallanthus	Thomas Nuttall (1786–1859)	Plantaginaceae	Bu
Nuxia	Jean Baptiste François de Lanux (1702–1772), French amateur botanist on Réunion	Stilbaceae	Bu
Nuytsia	Pieter Nuyts (1598–1655)	Loranthaceae	Bu
Nymania	Carl Fredrik Nyman (1820–1893)	Meliaceae	Bu
Obetia	possibly Arthur Obet (1802–1842) or Louis Jean Marie Obet (1777–1856), both French naval surgeons	Urticaceae	Bu
Obregonia	Álvaro Obregón (1880–1928), president of Mexico	Cactaceae	Ba
Ochagavia	Silvestre Ochagavía Errázuriz (b. 1820), Chilean minister of education	Bromeliaceae	St
Ochoterenaea	Isaac Ochoterena (1885–1950), Mexican botanist and histologist; taught at the University of Mexico	Anacardiaceae	Bu
Oddoniodendron	Adolf Oddon (1863–1906), Belgian clergyman in Namur and Liège; collected plants in Africa for a botanical garden in Brussels	Fabaceae	Bu
Odonellia	Carlos Alberto O'Donell (1912–1954), Argentinian botanist at the Miguel Lillo Foundation in San Miguel de Tucumán	Convolvulaceae	Bu
Oedera	Georg Christian Oeder (1728–1791)	Asteraceae	Bu
Oemleria	Augustus Gottlieb Oemler (1773–1852), German-American naturalist	Rosaceae	Co
Oestlundia	Karl Erik Magnus Östlund (1875–1938), Swedish plant collector; collected orchids in Mexico	Orchidaceae	Bu
Ohwia	Jisaburo Ohwi (1905–1977)	Fabaceae	Bu
Okenia	Lorenz Oken (1779–1851)	Nyctaginaceae	Bu
Oldenburgia	Franz Pehr Oldenburg (1740–1774), Swedish plant collector; traveled as a soldier in the service of the Danish East India Company to South Africa and Madagascar; collected for Kew Gardens	Asteraceae	Bu
Oldenlandia	Henrik Bernard Oldenland (1663–1697)	Rubiaceae	Bu
Oldenlandiopsis	Henrik Bernard Oldenland (1663–1697)	Rubiaceae	Bu
Oldfeltia	Karin Oldfelt Hjertonsson (b. 1940), Swedish artist who collaborated with the author Bertil Nordenstam; was the Swedish ambassador to Cuba for several years	Asteraceae	Bu
Oldfieldia	Richard Albert Kearns Oldfield (1809–1859), British doctor and colonial administrator	Picrodendraceae	Bu
Olearia	Johann Gottfried Olearius (1635–1711), German theologian	Asteraceae	Co
Olfersia	Ignaz Franz Werner Maria von Olfers, (1793–1871)	Dryopteridaceae	Bt
Olgaea	Olga Fedchenko (1845–1921)	Asteraceae	Bu
Olinia	Johan Henrik Olin (1769–1824), Swedish student of Carl Peter Thunberg	Penaeaceae	St
Oliverella	Daniel Oliver (1830–1916)	Loranthaceae	Bu
Oliveria	Guillaume-Antoine Olivier (1756–1814)	Apiaceae	Bu
Oliveriana	Daniel Oliver (1830–1916)	Orchidaceae	Bu
Olmediella	Vicente de Olmedo (c. 1763 – 1854), botanist and royal warden of Cinchona groves (grown for quinine)	Salicaceae	Bu
Olneya	Stephen Thayer Olney (1812–1878)	Fabaceae	Bu
Ooia	Ooi Im Hin, student of the authors of the genus, Sin Yeng Wong and Peter Charles Boyce	Araceae	Bu
Orania	William I of the Netherlands (1772–1843)	Arecaceae	Bu
Oraniopsis	William I of the Netherlands (1772–1843)	Arecaceae	Bu
Orcuttia	Charles Russell Orcutt (1864–1929)	Poaceae	Qu
Oreomunnea	Francisco María Oreamuno Bonilla (1801–1856), politician	Juglandaceae	Bu
Oreoschimperella	Georg Wilhelm Schimper (1804–1878)	Apiaceae	Bu
Orfilea	Mathieu Orfila (1787–1853), toxicologist	Euphorbiaceae	Bu
Orlaya	János Orlay (1770–1829), Hungarian theologist and doctor; military doctor in Russian service	Apiaceae	Ba
Orleanesia	Prince Gaston, Count of Eu (1842–1922)	Orchidaceae	Bu
Ornduffia	Robert Ornduff (1932–2000)	Menyanthaceae	Bu
Ortegia	José Ortega (d. 1761), Spanish military apothecary at the court of Ferdinand VI; secretary of the royal academy of medicine; director of a medicinal botanical garden in Madrid	Caryophyllaceae	Bu
Ortegocactus	Francisco Ortega (20th century), plant collector, and his extended family from San José Lachiguiri in Mexico	Cactaceae	Ba
Orthopichonia	Marcel Pichon (1921–1954)	Apocynaceae	Bu
Osbeckia	Pehr Osbeck (1723–1805)	Melastomataceae	St
Osbertia	Osbert Salvin (1835–1898)	Asteraceae	Bu
Osbornia	John Walter Osborne (1828–1902), chemist	Myrtaceae	Bu
Oschatzia	Adolph Oschatz (1812–1857), German doctor and botanist; an inventor of microtomy	Apiaceae	Bu
Oserya	Alexandre Victor Eugène Hulot d'Osery (1819–1846), French geologist and engineer	Podostemaceae	Bu
Ossaea	José Antonio de la Ossa (d. c. 1829), Cuban botanist; botanical garden director in Havana	Melastomataceae	Bu
Ostrowskia	Michael Nicholazewitsch von Ostrowsky (1827–1901), Russian minister of the interior	Campanulaceae	St
Osvaldoa	Osvaldo Morrone (1957–2011), Argentinian botanist and former director of the Instituto de Botánica Darwinion in San Isidro	Poaceae	Bt
Oteiza	Juan José de Oteiza y Vértiz (1777–1810), Mexican clergyman and natural scientist; professor of physics and mineralogy	Asteraceae	Bu
Ottleya	Alice Maria Ottley (1882–1971)	Fabaceae	Bu
Ottoa	Christoph Friedrich Otto (1783–1856)	Apiaceae	Bu
Ottochloa	Otto Stapf (1857–1933)	Poaceae	Bu
Ottoschmidtia	Otto Christian Schmidt (1900–1951), German botanist, professor in Berlin und Münster; specialist in algae	Rubiaceae	Bu
Ottoschulzia	Otto Eugen Schulz (1874–1936)	Metteniusaceae	Bu
Ottosonderia	Otto Wilhelm Sonder (1812–1881)	Aizoaceae	Bu
Ourisia	Oury, governor of the Falkland Islands in the 1760s	Plantaginaceae	St
Ovidia	Ovid (43 BC – c. 17), poet	Thymelaeaceae	Bu
Ovieda	Gonzalo Fernández de Oviedo y Valdés (1478–1557), colonialist and historian	Lamiaceae	Bu
Owenia	Richard Owen (1804–1892)	Meliaceae	Bu
Oyedaea	Alfonso Oyeda, Spanish seafarer; brought Amerigo Vespucci to the New World	Asteraceae	Bu
Pabstia	Guido Frederico João Pabst (1914–1980)	Orchidaceae	Bu
Pabstiella	Guido Frederico João Pabst (1914–1980)	Orchidaceae	Bu
Packera	John G. Packer (1929–2019), Canadian botanist at the university in Alberta, specialist in Albertan, alpine and arctic flora	Asteraceae	Ba
Padbruggea	Robbert Padtbrugge (1638–1703), Dutch doctor in the service of the Dutch East India Company; governor of Ternate	Fabaceae	Bu
Painteria	Joseph Hannum Painter (1879–1908), American plant collector; collected with the author of the genus, Joseph Nelson Rose	Fabaceae	Bu
Palafoxia	perhaps José de Palafox y Melci (1776–1847), military officer, or Juan de Palafox y Mendoza (1600–1659), bishop and politician	Asteraceae	St
Palaua	Antonio Palau y Verdera (1734–1793), Spanish naturalist	Malvaceae	St
Palisota	Palisot de Beauvois (1752–1820)	Commelinaceae	St
Palmerella	Edward Palmer (c. 1829 – 1911)	Campanulaceae	Qu
Palmeria	James Frederick Palmer (1803–1871), doctor and politician	Monimiaceae	Qu
Pamianthe	Albert Pam (1875–1955), financier and Fellow of the Linnean Society	Amaryllidaceae	St
Pancheria	Jean Armand Isidore Pancher (1814–1877)	Cunoniaceae	Bu
Panda	Paul Panda Farnana (1888–1930) (Note: Not listed in Burkhardt)	Pandaceae	Ch
Paneroa	José L. Panero (b. 1959), American botanist from University of Texas in Austin	Asteraceae	Bt
Panzerina	Georg Wolfgang Franz Panzer (1755–1829)	Lamiaceae	Bu
Pappea	Karl Wilhelm Ludwig Pappe (1803–1862)	Sapindaceae	Bu
Paradisea	Giovanni Paradisi (1760–1826), mathematician, writer and senator	Asparagaceae	Co
Parishia	Charles Samuel Pollock Parish (1822–1897), Indian-born English clergyman and botanist, missionary in Burma (present-day Myanmar); collected mosses and orchids	Anacardiaceae	Bu
Parkia	Mungo Park (1771–1806)	Fabaceae	Bu
Parkinsonia	John Parkinson (1567–1650)	Fabaceae	St
Parlatoria	Filippo Parlatore (1816–1877)	Brassicaceae	Bu
Parmentiera	Antoine-Augustin Parmentier (1737–1813)	Bignoniaceae	St
Parodia	Domingo Parodi (1823–1890)	Cactaceae	Qu
Parodianthus	Lorenzo Raimundo Parodi (1895–1966), Argentinian botanist and agricultural engineer, professor of botany in Buenos Aires and La Plata with a focus on South American grasses	Verbenaceae	Bu
Parodiodendron	Lorenzo Raimundo Parodi (1895–1966), Argentinian botanist and agricultural engineer, professor of botany in Buenos Aires and La Plata with a focus on South American grasses	Picrodendraceae	Bu
Parodiodoxa	Lorenzo Raimundo Parodi (1895–1966), Argentinian botanist and agricultural engineer, professor of botany in Buenos Aires and La Plata with a focus on South American grasses	Brassicaceae	Bu
Parodiophyllochloa	Lorenzo Raimundo Parodi (1895–1966), Argentinian botanist and agricultural engineer, professor of botany in Buenos Aires and La Plata with a focus on South American grasses	Poaceae	Bu
Parolinia	Alberto Parolini (1788–1867), Italian botanist from Bassano del Grappa; student of Giovanni Battista Brocchi	Brassicaceae	Bu
Parrotia	Friedrich Parrot (1792–1841)	Hamamelidaceae	Co
Parrotiopsis	Friedrich Parrot (1792–1841)	Hamamelidaceae	St
Parrya	William Edward Parry (1790–1855), naval officer and explorer	Brassicaceae	Bu
Parryella	Charles Christopher Parry (1823–1890)	Fabaceae	Bu
Parsana	Ahmad Parsa (1907–1997)	Urticaceae	Bu
Parsonsia	James Parsons (1705–1770), doctor and antiquary	Apocynaceae	Bu
Pasaccardoa	Pier Andrea Saccardo (1845–1920)	Asteraceae	Bu
Pascalia	Diego Baldassare Pascal (1768–1812), French-born Italian doctor and botanist; professor of botany in Parma and botanical garden director	Asteraceae	Bu
Passovia	Friedrich Passow (19th century), German consul in Puerto Cabello in Venezuela; member of Rostock's naturalist society	Loranthaceae	Bu
Patersonia	William Paterson (1755–1810)	Iridaceae	Ba
Patinoa	Víctor Manuel Patiño (1912–2001), Colombian agricultural technologist	Malvaceae	Bu
Patrinia	Eugène Louis Melchior Patrin (1742–1814)	Caprifoliaceae	Co
Patzkea	Erwin Patzke (1929–2018), German botanist and professor, specialist in grasses	Poaceae	Bu
Pauia	Hermenegild Santapau (1903–1970)	Solanaceae	Bu
Pauldopia	Paul Louis Amans Dop (1876–1954)	Bignoniaceae	Bu
Paulita	(Paul) Pavel Nikolaevich Ovczinnikov (1903–1979), Russian Botanist	Apiaceae	Bt
Paullinia	Simon Paulli (1603–1680)	Sapindaceae	St
Paulownia	Anna Pavlovna of Russia (1795–1865)	Paulowniaceae	Ch
Pavonia	José Antonio Pavón Jiménez (1754–1844)	Malvaceae	St
Payena	Anselme Payen (1795–1871)	Sapotaceae	Bu
Payera	Jean-Baptiste Payer (1818–1860), French doctor, botanist (bryologist) and naturalist; professor of geology and mineralogy at the university in Rennes	Rubiaceae	Bu
Paysonia	Edwin Blake Payson (1893–1927), American botanist, specialist in Lesquerella	Brassicaceae	Bu
Pearcea	Richard Pearce (c. 1835 – 1868)	Gesneriaceae	Bu
Pearsonia	Henry Harold Welch Pearson (1870–1916)	Fabaceae	Bu
Pechuel-loeschea	Eduard Pechuël-Loesche (1840–1913)	Asteraceae	Bu
Peddiea	John Peddie (d. 1840), British military officer and plant collector; fought in South Africa and elsewhere; namesake of Fort Peddie there	Thymelaeaceae	Bu
Pedersenia	Troels Myndel Pedersen (1916–2000), Danish-born Argentinian botanist with a large herbarium; specialist in Amaranthaceae	Amaranthaceae	Bu
Pedleya	Leslie Pedley (1930–2018), was an Australian botanist who specialised in the genus Acacia	Fabaceae	Bt
Peersia	Victor Stanley Peers (1874–1940), Australian botanist, plant collector, and amateur archeologist	Aizoaceae	Qu
Pegolettia	Francesco Balducci Pegolotti (fl. 1310 – 1347), merchant	Asteraceae	Bu
Pehria	Pehr Löfling (1729–1756)	Lythraceae	Bu
Peixotoa	Domingos Ribeiro II (1790–1846), Brazilian personal physician at the Brazilian court in Rio de Janeiro	Malpighiaceae	Bu
Pellegrinia	François Pellegrin (1881–1965)	Ericaceae	Bu
Pelliciera	Guillaume Pellicier (1490–1568)	Tetrameristaceae	Bu
Pellionia	Marie Joseph Alphonse Pellion (1796–1868), French naval officer (later an admiral); took part in a global expedition on the ship Uranie	Urticaceae	Ba
Pembertonia	Pemberton Walcott (1834–1883), English plant collector who settled in Western Australia; namesake of the city Pemberton	Asteraceae	Bu
Penaea	Pierre Pena (1535–1605), French doctor and botanist; assistant to Matthias de l'Obel in Montpellier and in England; also a royal personal physician	Penaeaceae	Bu
Pennantia	Thomas Pennant (1726–1798)	Pennantiaceae	Bu
Pennellia	Francis W. Pennell (1886–1952)	Brassicaceae	Bu
Pennellianthus	Francis W. Pennell (1886–1952)	Plantaginaceae	Bu
Pentzia	Carl Johann or Carolus Johannes Pentz (18th and 19th centuries), Swedish student of Carl Peter Thunberg	Asteraceae	Bu
Pereskia	Nicolas-Claude Fabri de Peiresc (1580–1637)	Cactaceae	St
Pereskiopsis	Nicolas-Claude Fabri de Peiresc (1580–1637)	Cactaceae	St
Perezia	Lorenzo or Lázaro Perez, 16th-century Spanish apothecary and author	Asteraceae	St
Periandra	Periander (627 BC – 584 BC), ruler	Fabaceae	Bu
Periclesia	Pericles (c. 490 BC – 429 BC), statesman	Ericaceae	Bu
Perralderia	Henri René Letourneux de la Perraudière (1831–1861), French botanist who collected in France and Algeria and on the islands of Madeira and the Canaries	Asteraceae	Bu
Perriera	Joseph Marie Henry Alfred Perrier de la Bâthie (1873–1958)	Simaroubaceae	Bu
Perrierbambus	Joseph Marie Henry Alfred Perrier de la Bâthie (1873–1958)	Poaceae	Bu
Perrierodendron	Joseph Marie Henry Alfred Perrier de la Bâthie (1873–1958)	Sarcolaenaceae	Bu
Perrierophytum	Joseph Marie Henry Alfred Perrier de la Bâthie (1873–1958)	Malvaceae	Bu
Perrierosedum	Joseph Marie Henry Alfred Perrier de la Bâthie (1873–1958)	Crassulaceae	Bu
Perrottetia	George Samuel Perrottet (1793–1870)	Dipentodontaceae	Bu
Perryodendron	Lily May Perry (1895–1992)	Rutaceae	Bu
Persoonia	Christiaan Hendrik Persoon (1761–1836)	Proteaceae	St
Pertya	Maximilian Perty (1804–1884)	Asteraceae	Bu
Pervillaea	Auguste Pervillé (d. c. 1868), French botanist at the National Museum of Natural History; collected on Réunion, Madagascar and neighboring islands	Apocynaceae	Bu
Pescatoria	Jean-Pierre Pescatore (1793–1865), merchant and orchid enthusiast	Orchidaceae	St
Petagnaea	Vincenzo Petagna (1734–1810)	Apiaceae	Bu
Petchia	Tom Petch (1870–1948)	Apocynaceae	Bu
Petelotiella	Paul Alfred Pételot (1885–1965)	Urticaceae	Bu
Peteravenia	Peter H. Raven (b. 1936)	Asteraceae	Bu
Peteria	Robert Peter (1805–1894), English-born American botanist, chemist, doctor, zoologist and geologist; founder of the University of Louisville School of Medicine	Fabaceae	Bu
Petermannia	August Heinrich Petermann (1822–1878)	Petermanniaceae	Bu
Peterodendron	Gustav Albert Peter (1853–1937)	Achariaceae	Bu
Petersianthus	Wilhelm Peters (1815–1883)	Lecythidaceae	Bu
Petiniotia	Richard Petiniot (d. before 1980), Belgian air force officer in the Sahara and Iran	Brassicaceae	Bu
Petitia	François Pourfour du Petit (1664–1741), doctor	Lamiaceae	Qu
Petitiocodon	Ernest Marie Antoine Petit (1927–2007), Belgian professor of botany and botanical garden director	Rubiaceae	Bu
Petiveria	James Petiver (c. 1660 – 1718)	Petiveriaceae	Ch
Petrea	Robert Petre, 8th Baron Petre (1713–1742)	Verbenaceae	St
Petroedmondia	Pierre Edmond Boissier (1810–1885)	Apiaceae	Bu
Petrosavia	Pietro Savi (1811–1871), Italian professor of botany in Pisa; botanical garden director	Petrosaviaceae	Bu
Petrosimonia	Peter Simon Pallas (1741–1811)	Amaranthaceae	Bu
Petteria	Franz Petter (1798–1853), Austrian botanist in Dalmatia	Fabaceae	St
Peyritschia	Johann Joseph Peyritsch (1835–1889)	Poaceae	Bu
Pfaffia	Christoph Heinrich Pfaff (1773–1852)	Amaranthaceae	Bu
Pfeiffera	Ludwig Karl Georg Pfeiffer (1805–1877)	Cactaceae	Bu
Phania	Phaenias of Eresus (4th century BC), philosopher	Asteraceae	Bu
Pharnaceum	Pharnaces II of Pontus (died 47 BC)	Molluginaceae	Bu
Phelpsiella	William H. Phelps Sr. (1875–1965) and his son William H. Phelps Jr. (1902–1988) and daughter-in-law Katherine Deery Phelps (1908–2001)	Rapateaceae	Bu
Phelypaea	Louis Phélypeaux, comte de Pontchartrain (1643–1727) and Jérôme Phélypeaux (1674–1747), politician	Orobanchaceae	Bu
Philadelphus	perhaps Ptolemy II Philadelphus (c. 308 BC – 246 BC)	Hydrangeaceae	Co
Philcoxia	David Philcox (1926–2003), English botanist at Kew Gardens who worked extensively in tropical Scrophulariaceae	Plantaginaceae	Bt
Philibertia	Jean-Baptiste-Charles Legendre de Luçay (1754–1836), French administrator and landowner; wrote an introduction to botany and a botanical dictionary	Apocynaceae	Bu
Philippiella	Rodolfo Amando Philippi (1808–1904)	Caryophyllaceae	Bu
Phippsia	Constantine Phipps, 2nd Baron Mulgrave (1744–1792)	Poaceae	Bu
Phitosia	Dimitrios Phitos (b. 1930), Greek professor of botany at the university in Patras; specialist in Greek flora	Asteraceae	Bu
Picardaea	Louis Picarda (1848–1901), French clergyman, professor of natural science, natural history and botany on Martinique	Rubiaceae	Bu
Picconia	Giovanni Maria Piccone (1772–1832), Italian clergyman and agronomist, member of various scientific societies in Italy and in Paris	Oleaceae	Bu
Pichonia	Louis Auguste Pichon (1838–1924), French naval doctor, consul in Shanhai, China	Sapotaceae	Bu
Pickeringia	Charles Pickering (1805–1878)	Fabaceae	Bu
Pictetia	Marc-Auguste Pictet (1752–1825)	Fabaceae	Bu
Pierranthus	Jean Baptiste Louis Pierre (1833–1905)	Linderniaceae	Bu
Pierreodendron	Jean Baptiste Louis Pierre (1833–1905)	Simaroubaceae	Bu
Pierrina	Jean Baptiste Louis Pierre (1833–1905)	Lecythidaceae	Bu
Pigafetta	Antonio Pigafetta (c. 1491 – c. 1531), explorer	Arecaceae	Bu
Pilgerina	Robert Knud Friedrich Pilger (1876–1953)	Santalaceae	Bu
Pilgerodendron	Robert Knud Friedrich Pilger (1876–1953)	Cupressaceae	Bu
Pillansia	Neville Stuart Pillans (1884–1964), South African botanist at the Bolus Herbarium in Cape Town	Iridaceae	Bu
Pineda	Antonio Pineda (1753–1792)	Salicaceae	Bu
Pinellia	Gian Vincenzo Pinelli (1535–1601)	Araceae	St
Pinillosia	Claudio Martinez de Pinillos y Ceballos (1782–1853), Cuban military officer, governor and economist who supported science, literature and the mechanization of industry	Asteraceae	Bu
Pinochia	Marcel Pichon (1921–1954)	Apocynaceae	Bu
Pintoa	Francisco Antonio Pinto (1785–1858), president of Chile	Zygophyllaceae	Bu
Pinzona	Vicente Yáñez Pinzón (c. 1462 – after 1514), naval officer and explorer	Dilleniaceae	Bu
Pippenalia	Richard Wayne Pippen (b. 1935), American botanist at the University of Michigan	Asteraceae	Bu
Piqueria	Andrés Piquer (1711–1772)	Asteraceae	St
Piqueriella	Andrés Piquer (1711–1772)	Asteraceae	Bu
Piresia	João Murça Pires (1917–1994)	Poaceae	Bu
Piresiella	João Murça Pires (1917–1994)	Poaceae	Bu
Pisonia	Willem Piso (1611–1678)	Nyctaginaceae	Ba
Pisoniella	Willem Piso (1611–1678)	Nyctaginaceae	Qu
Pistorinia	Santiago Pistorini (d. 1776), Italian-Spanish doctor, personal physician to Charles III	Crassulaceae	Bu
Pitardella	Charles-Joseph Marie Pitard (1873–1927)	Rubiaceae	Bu
Pitcairnia	William Pitcairn (1711–1791)	Bromeliaceae	St
Pitraea	Adolf Samoilovich Pitra (1830–1889), Russian professor of botany in Kharkiv	Verbenaceae	Bu
Pittoniotis	Joseph Pitton de Tournefort (1656–1708)	Rubiaceae	Bu
Planchonella	Jules Émile Planchon (1823–1888)	Sapotaceae	Bu
Planchonia	Jules Émile Planchon (1823–1888)	Lecythidaceae	Bu
Planera	Johann Jakob Planer (1743–1789), German professor and botanist	Ulmaceae	St
Platonia	Plato (427 BC – 347 BC), philosopher and writer	Clusiaceae	Bu
Platyschkuhria	Christian Schkuhr (1741–1811)	Asteraceae	Bu
Plazia	Juan Plaza (16th century), Spanish doctor and botanist; professor of medicine in Valencia	Asteraceae	Bu
Plenckia	Joseph Jakob Plenck (1735–1807), doctor	Celastraceae	Bu
Plinia	Pliny the Elder (c. 23 – 79)	Myrtaceae	Bu
Plowmania	Timothy Plowman (1944–1989)	Solanaceae	Bu
Plowmanianthus	Timothy Plowman (1944–1989)	Commelinaceae	Bu
Pluchea	Noël-Antoine Pluche (1688–1761)	Asteraceae	Bu
Plukenetia	Leonard Plukenet (1642–1706)	Euphorbiaceae	Bu
Plumeria	Charles Plumier (1646–1704)	Apocynaceae	St
Plutarchia	Plutarch (c. 45 – c. 125), philosopher and writer	Ericaceae	Bu
Poeppigia	Eduard Friedrich Poeppig (1798–1868)	Fabaceae	Bu
Poggea	Paul Pogge (1838–1884)	Achariaceae	Bu
Pohlidium	Richard Walter Pohl (1916–1993), American botanist at the University of Iowa; specialist in grasses	Poaceae	Bu
Pohliella	Josef Pohl (1864–1939), German botanical illustrator	Podostemaceae	Bt
Poilanedora	Eugène Poilane (1888–1964), French plant collector at the botanical institute in present-day Ho Chi Minh City, Vietnam; also worked in the forest service	Capparaceae	Bu
Poilannammia	Eugène Poilane (1888–1964), French plant collector at the botanical institute in present-day Ho Chi Minh City, Vietnam; also worked in the forest service	Melastomataceae	Bu
Poiretia	Jean Louis Marie Poiret (1755–1834)	Fabaceae	Bu
Poissonia	Jules Poisson (1833–1919), French botanist at the National Museum of Natural History; collected plants in New Caledonia	Fabaceae	Bu
Poitea	Pierre Antoine Poiteau (1766–1854)	Fabaceae	Bu
Pojarkovia	Antonina Pojarkova (1897–1980)	Asteraceae	Bu
Polaskia	Charles Polaski (1898–1986), American cactus and Camellia collector from Oklahoma City	Cactaceae	Bu
Polemannia	Peter Heinrich Polemann (1779 – 1839), German chemist and apothecary who supported plant collectors in Schleswig-Holstein; went to Cape Town, South Africa	Apiaceae	Bu
Polemanniopsis	Peter Heinrich Polemann (1779 – 1839), German chemist and apothecary who supported plant collectors in Schleswig-Holstein; went to Cape Town, South Africa	Apiaceae	Bu
Polevansia	Illtyd Buller Pole-Evans (1879–1968)	Poaceae	Bu
Polhillia	Roger Marcus Polhill (b. 1937), English botanist at Kew Gardens with a focus on Fabaceae; collected in Africa	Fabaceae	Bu
Polhillides	Roger Marcus Polhill (b. 1937), English botanist at Kew Gardens with a focus on Fabaceae; collected in Africa	Fabaceae	Bt
Poljakanthema	Petr Petrovich Poljakov (1902–1974), Russian botanist; specialist in Asteraceae and sub-Siberian plants	Asteraceae	Bu
Poljakovia	Petr Petrovich Poljakov (1902–1974), Russian botanist; specialist in Asteraceae and sub-Siberian plants	Asteraceae	Bu
Pollia	Jan van der Poll (18th century), Dutch consul who supported Carl Peter Thunberg	Commelinaceae	Bu
Pollichia	Johan Adam Pollich (1740–1780)	Caryophyllaceae	Bu
Polyclita	Polykleitos (c. 480 BC – end of the 5th century BC), Greek sculptor of bronzes (copies of which probably persist as Roman marble statues)	Ericaceae	Bu
Pomaria	Jaime Honorato Pomar (c. 1550 – 1606), Spanish doctor and botanist, professor of medicine in Valencia; also a royal personal physician	Fabaceae	Bu
Pombalia	Sebastião José de Carvalho e Melo, 1st Marquis of Pombal (1699–1782)	Violaceae	Bu
Pometia	Pierre Pomet (1658–1699)	Sapindaceae	Bu
Pommereschea	Robert von Pommer Esche (1833–1898), Prussian official, director of a horticultural society	Zingiberaceae	Bu
Pommereulla	(Madame) du Gage, born Elisabeth Julienne Pommereull (1733–1782); French botanist; specialist in grasses	Poaceae	Bu
Pontederia	Giulio Pontedera (1688–1757)	Pontederiaceae	Ch
Ponthieva	Henry de Ponthieu (1731–1808)	Orchidaceae	Qu
Poortmannia	Hugo Anne Cornelis Poortman (1858–1953), Dutch garden architect; collected plants in Colombia and Ecuador; created various manor and castle gardens	Solanaceae	Bu
Popowia	Johannes Siegmund Valentin Popowitsch (1705–1774), Austrian linguist and naturalist, professor of German language and linguistics at the university in Vienna; built up a large herbarium	Annonaceae	Bu
Porcelia	Antonio Porcel Román (1755–1832), Spanish botanical patron who helped Hipólito Ruiz López and José Antonio Pavón Jiménez	Annonaceae	Bu
Porlieria	Antonio Porlier, Marques de Bajamar (1722–1813), Spanish lawyer and judge in Madrid and Lima, Peru	Zygophyllaceae	Bu
Portea	Marius Porte (d. 1866), French explorer and naturalist	Bromeliaceae	St
Portenschlagiella	Franz Edler von Portenschlag-Ledermayr (1772–1822), Austrian lawyer and botanist; collected in the Alps and the Dalmatian islands	Apiaceae	Bu
Porterandia	George Isaac Porter (1800–1848), British gardener with the East India Company in present-day Kolkata; plant collector and teacher in Penang in present-day Malaysia	Rubiaceae	Bu
Porterella	Thomas Conrad Porter (1822–1901)	Campanulaceae	Bu
Portlandia	Margaret Bentinck, Duchess of Portland (1715–1785)	Rubiaceae	St
Poskea	Friedrich Poske (1852–1925), German teacher and natural scientist in Berlin	Plantaginaceae	Bu
Postiella	George Edward Post (1838–1909)	Apiaceae	Bu
Potaninia	Grigory Potanin (1835–1920)	Rosaceae	Bu
Pottingeria	Eldred Charles Pottinger (1868–1929), military doctor in the army in India; assisted the author of this genus with the flora in Kachin in Burma (present-day Myanmar)	Celastraceae	Bu
Pottsia	John Potts (d. 1822), English gardener and plant collector for the Royal Horticultural Society	Apocynaceae	Bu
Pouchetia	Félix Archimède Pouchet (1800–1872)	Rubiaceae	Bu
Poulsenia	Viggo Albert Poulsen (1855–1919), Danish professor of botany at the pharmacy school in Copenhagen; also worked in present-day Bogor in Indonesia	Moraceae	Bu
Poupartia	François Poupart (d. 1708)	Anacardiaceae	Bu
Poupartiopsis	François Poupart (d. 1708)	Anacardiaceae	Bu
Pourthiaea	J. A. Pourthié (1830–1866), French clergyman; missionary in Korea	Rosaceae	Bu
Pouzolzia	Pierre Marie Casimir de Pouzolz (1785–1858), French botanist and plant collector from Nîmes	Urticaceae	Bu
Pozoa	José Pozo (fl. 1800), Spanish botanist at a botanical garden in Madrid	Apiaceae	Bu
Pradosia	Camilo Maria Ferreira Armond, Conde de Prados (1815–1882), Brazilian doctor and politician, director of the observatory in Rio de Janeiro	Sapotaceae	Bu
Prainea	David Prain (1857–1944)	Moraceae	Bu
Pranceacanthus	Ghillean Prance (b. 1937)	Acanthaceae	Bu
Pratia	Charles Louis Prat-Bernon (1795–1817), French naval officer	Campanulaceae	St
Prescottia	John D. Prescott (1760–1837), English doctor and botanist in Saint Petersburg in Russia	Orchidaceae	Bu
Presliophytum	Carl Borivoj Presl (1794–1852)	Loasaceae	Bu
Prestelia	Michael August Friedrich Prestel (1809–1880), German mathematician, meteorologist and cartographer; professor of mathematics and natural science at a school in Emden, and director of the naturalist society there	Asteraceae	Bu
Prestoea	Henry Prestoe (1842–1923), British naturalist, gardener and botanist; botanical garden director in Trinidad	Arecaceae	Bu
Prestonia	Charles Preston (1660–1711), Scottish doctor and botanist	Apocynaceae	Bu
Preussiella	Paul Rudolf Preuss (1861–1926), German botanist and researcher; founded and directed a botanical garden in Kamerun (now Cameroon)	Melastomataceae	Bu
Preussiodora	Paul Rudolf Preuss (1861–1926), German botanist and researcher; founded and directed a botanical garden in Kamerun (now Cameroon)	Rubiaceae	Bu
Pringlea	John Pringle, 1st Baronet (1707–1782)	Brassicaceae	Bu
Prinsepia	James Prinsep (1799–1840)	Rosaceae	Co
Printzia	Jacob Printz (1740–1779), Swedish botanist, student of Carl Linnaeus	Asteraceae	Bu
Prioria	Alexander Prior (1809–1902), English doctor and botanist; collected in South Africa and North America	Fabaceae	Bu
Pritchardia	William Thomas Pritchard (1829–1907), adventurer	Arecaceae	St
Prockia	Christian Leberecht von Prøck (1718–1780), baron	Salicaceae	Bu
Prockiopsis	Christian Leberecht von Prøck (1718–1780), baron	Achariaceae	Bu
Prolongoa	Pablo Prolongo y García (1806–1885), Spanish apothecary and local plant collector; founded a pharmacology school in Málaga	Asteraceae	Bu
Promenaea	Promenaea, Greek priestess of Dodona	Orchidaceae	St
Proustia	Joseph Proust (1754–1826)	Asteraceae	Bu
Przewalskia	Nikolay Przhevalsky (1839–1888)	Solanaceae	Bu
Puccinellia	Benedetto Luigi Puccinelli (1808–1850), Italian doctor and botanist; taught chemistry, physics, pharmacology and agricultural science in Lucca; botanical garden director	Poaceae	Bu
Puelia	Timothée Puel (1813–1890)	Poaceae	Bu
Pueraria	Marc Nicolas Puerari (1766–1845), Swiss botanist	Fabaceae	St
Puhuaea	Pu Hwa Huang (b.1932), Chinese botanist	Fabaceae	Bt
Pullea	August Adriaan Pulle (1878–1955)	Cunoniaceae	Bu
Pullenia	Royal 'Roy' Pullen (1925 - 2009), Australian plant collector	Fabaceae	Bt
Pultenaea	Richard Pulteney (1730–1801)	Fabaceae	St
Purdiaea	William Purdie (c. 1817 – 1857), Scottish gardener at botanical gardens in Edinburgh and Trinidad; collected in Jamaica, Colombia and Venezuela	Clethraceae	Bu
Purdieanthus	William Purdie (c. 1817 – 1857), Scottish gardener at botanical gardens in Edinburgh and Trinidad; collected in Jamaica, Colombia and Venezuela	Gentianaceae	Bu
Purshia	Frederick Traugott Pursh (1774–1820)	Rosaceae	Co
Puschkinia	Apollo Mussin-Pushkin (1760–1805)	Asparagaceae	Co
Putterlickia	Aloys Putterlick (1810–1845), Austrian doctor and botanist (bryologist); natural history museum curator in Vienna	Celastraceae	Bu

== See also ==
- List of plant genus names with etymologies: A–C, D–K, L–P, Q–Z
- List of plant family names with etymologies
