= Madras Red sheep =

Sheep breed native to India

Madras Red Sheep
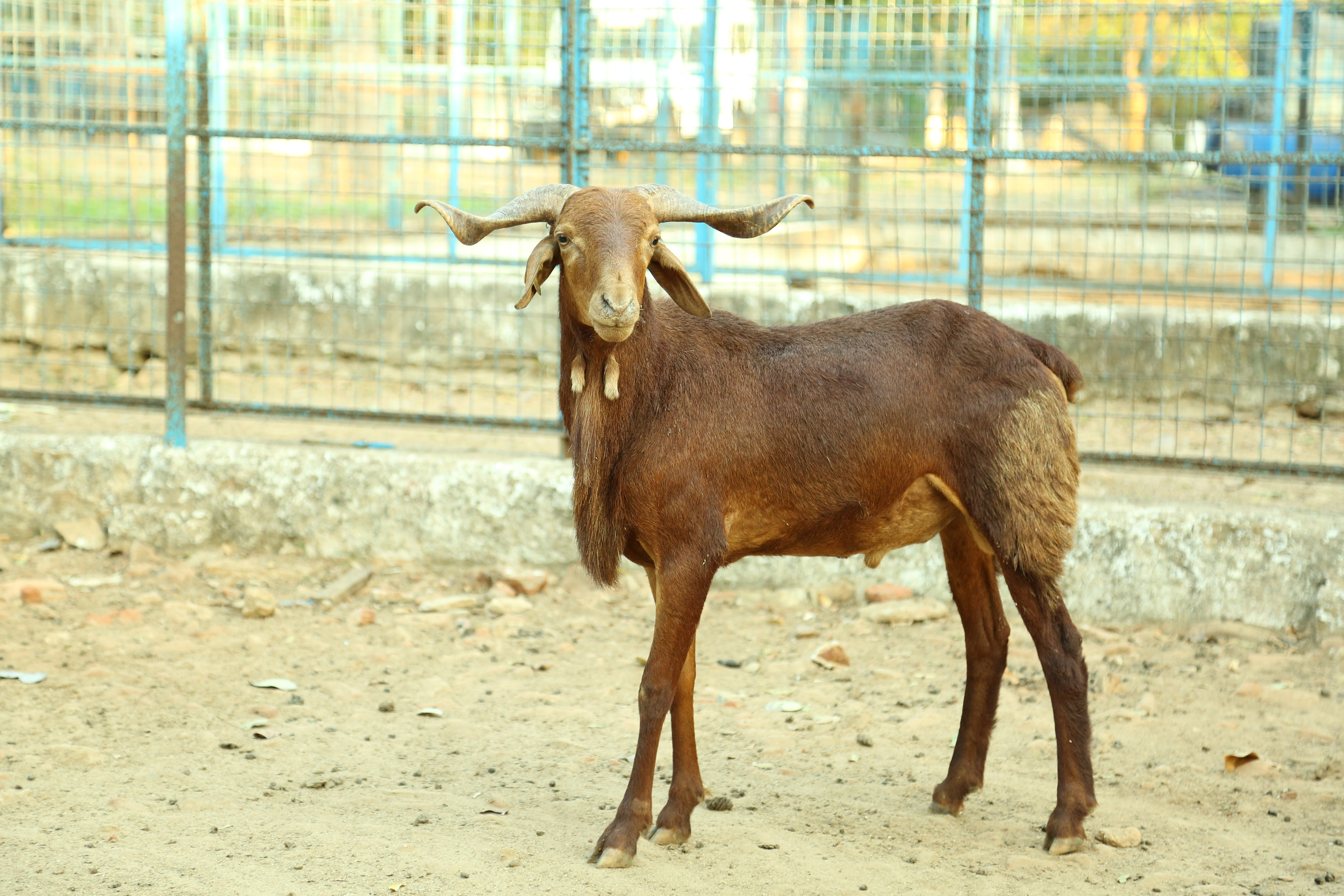
- Breeding ram
- Country of origin: India
- Distribution: Northeastern Tamil Nadu
- Use: mutton

Traits
- Horn status: only on males, coiled

The Madras Red Sheep is an indigenous breed of sheep native to the northeastern parts of Tamil Nadu. The breed is characterized by medium size, reddish brown in colour with white markings on the leg and forehead. They are hardy and drought tolerant. Males are horned and ewes are polled. Wattles are found in about 73% females and 69% males. They feed on grass and a variety of tree leaves including those of Albizzia, Ficus, Leucaena, Gliricidia, Erythrina, Inga dulce and Thespesia. The breed is maintained mostly for meat and is one of five hairy breeds from Tamil Nadu. The breed has been traditionally developed and maintained in the Kancheepuram and Thiruvallur district by Naicker and Pillai communities. In an outbreak of sheep pox there was a mortality of up to 10% among adults, while the mortality was about 37% in adults of Mechery sheep. A virus similar to that causing Rift Valley Fever has also been noted to affect the sheep in an outbreak 1994. They breed during July to September.

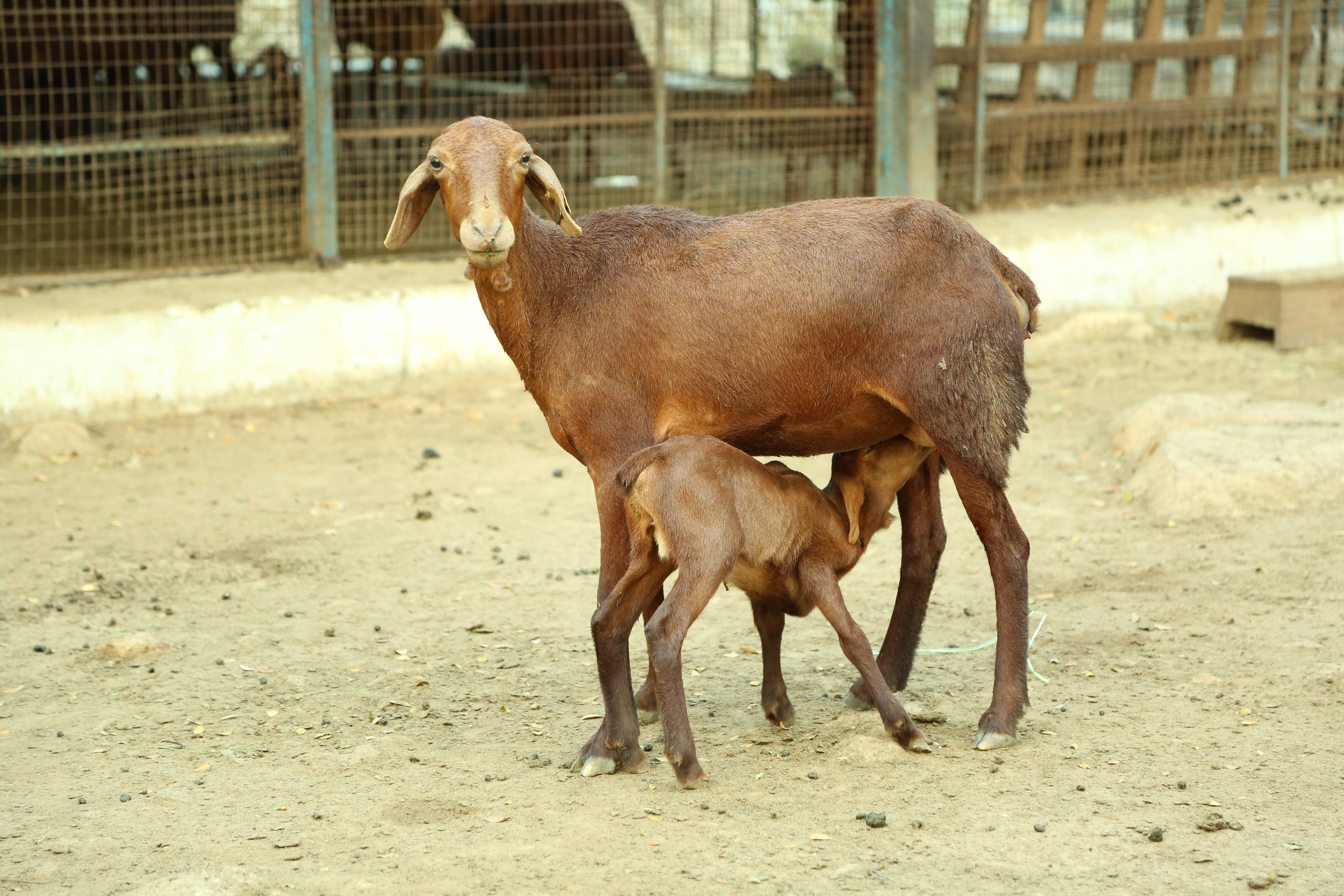
Ewe with lamb
