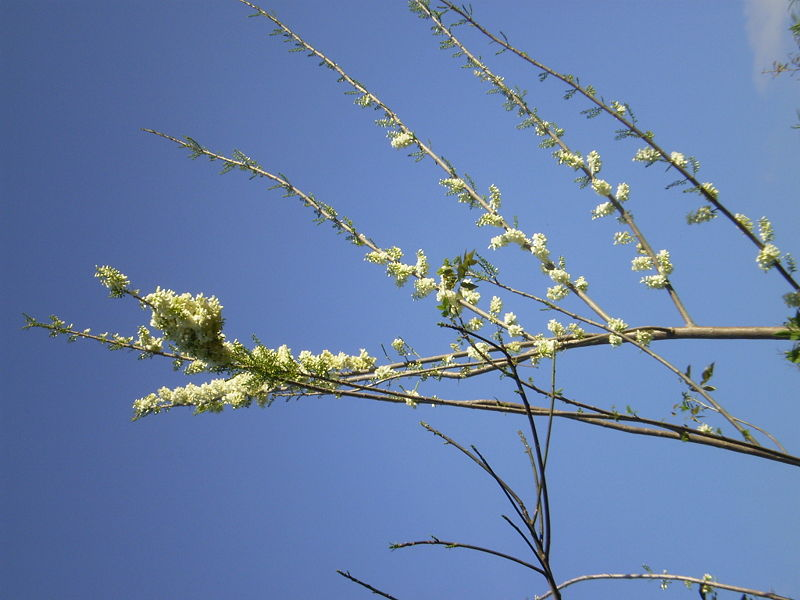
- Flowers

Scientific classification
- Kingdom: Plantae
- Clade: Tracheophytes
- Clade: Angiosperms
- Clade: Eudicots
- Clade: Rosids
- Order: Fabales
- Family: Fabaceae
- Subfamily: Faboideae
- Genus: Gliricidia
- Species: G. maculata

Binomial name
- Gliricidia maculata (Kunth) Steud.

Synonyms
- Galedupa pungam Blanco; Gliricidia sepium f. maculata (Kunth) Urb.; Lonchocarpus maculatus (Kunth) DC.; Robinia maculata Kunth

= Gliricidia maculata =

Species of plant in the legume family

Gliricidia maculata is a species of fast-growing leguminous tree in the family Fabaceae, native to southeastern Mexico, Belize, and Guatemala. It is often considered a synonym of Gliricidia sepium and shares many of its common names and uses. It is used to provide shade for growing tea, coffee, and cocoa, as a green manure, as a forage, particularly for goats and sheep, and in living fences.
