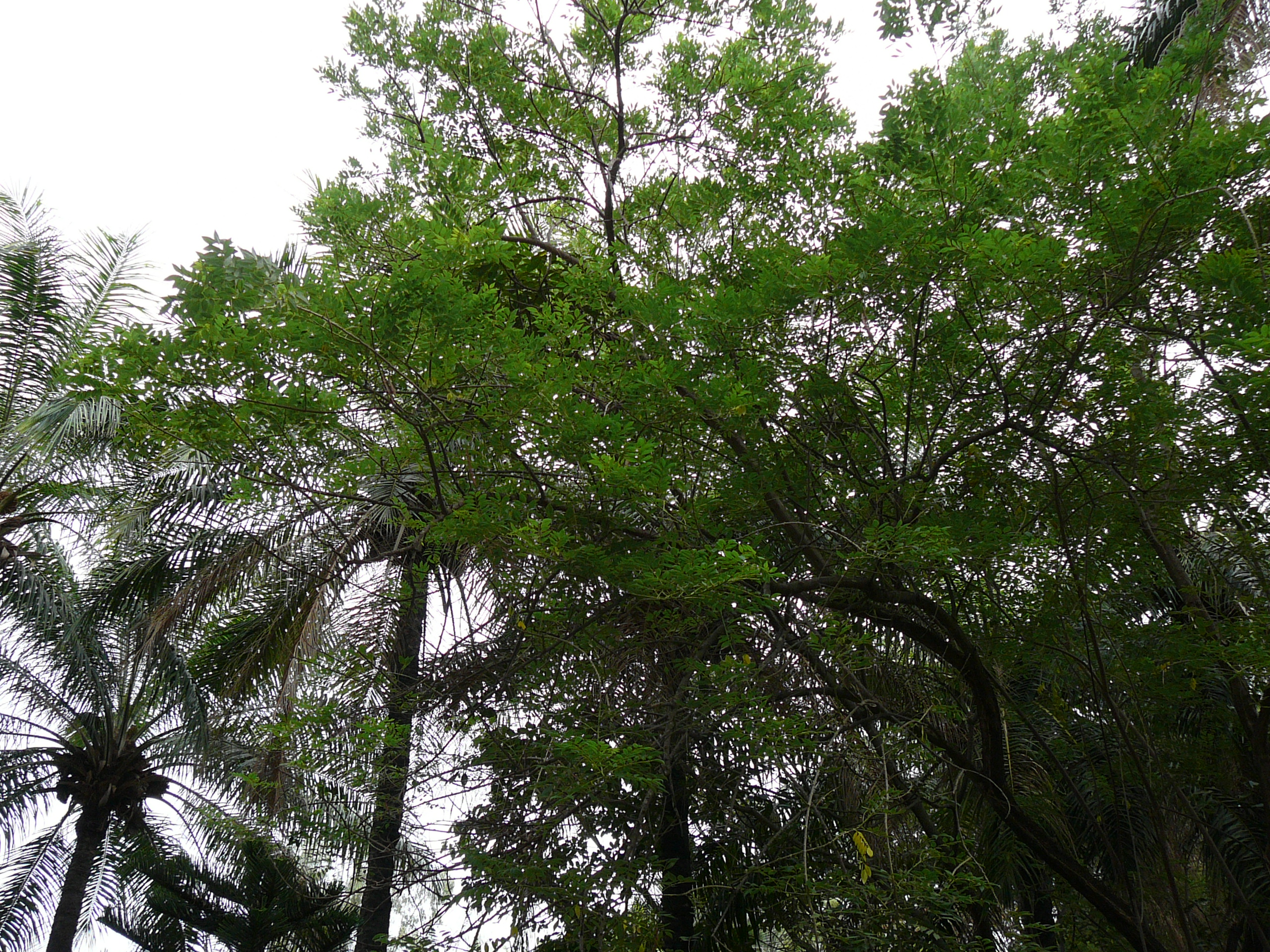

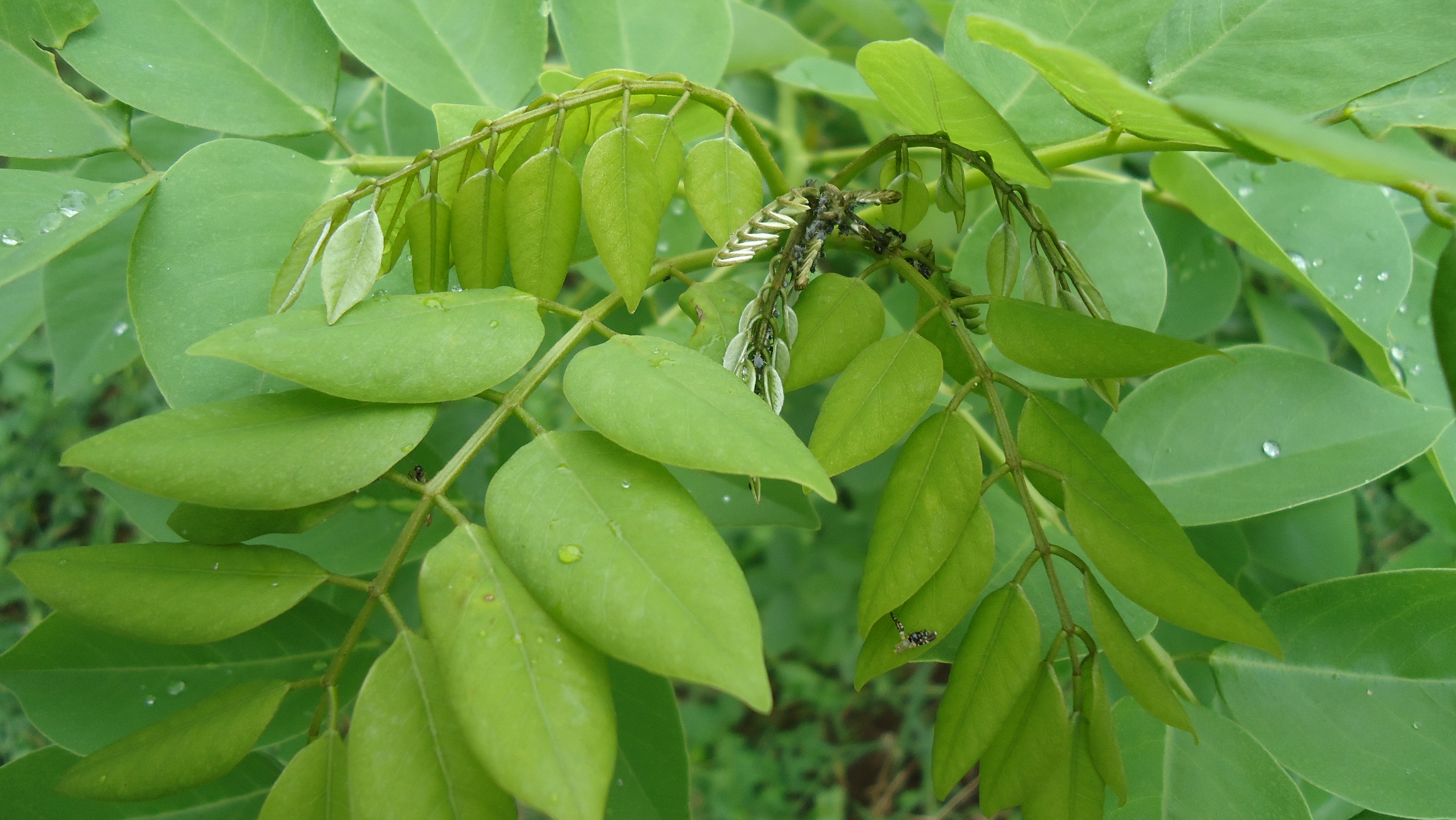

Conservation status
- Least Concern (IUCN 3.1)

Scientific classification
- Kingdom: Plantae
- Clade: Tracheophytes
- Clade: Angiosperms
- Clade: Eudicots
- Clade: Rosids
- Order: Fabales
- Family: Fabaceae
- Subfamily: Faboideae
- Clade: Hologalegina
- Clade: Robinioids
- Tribe: Robinieae
- Genus: Gliricidia
- Species: G. sepium

Binomial name
- Gliricidia sepium (Jacq.) Steud.

Synonyms
- Galedupa pungam Blanco; Gliricidia lambii Fernald; Gliricidia maculata var. multijuga Micheli; Gliricidia sepium (Jacq.) Kunth ex Griseb.; Lonchocarpus rosea (Mill.) DC.; Lonchocarpus sepium (Jacq.) DC.; Millettia luzonensis A.Gray; Millettia slendidissima "sensu Naves, non Blume"; Robinia maculata Kunth; Robinia rosea Mill.; Robinia sepium Jacq.; Robinia variegata Schltdl.

= Gliricidia sepium =

Species of legume

Gliricidia sepium, often simply referred to as gliricidia or by its Spanish common name madre de cacao (calque of Nahuatl cacahuanāntli; also anglicized as mother of cocoa), is a medium size leguminous tree belonging to the family Fabaceae. It is an important multi-purpose legume tree, with a native range from Mexico to Colombia, but now widely introduced to other tropical zones.

== Common names ==
Common names of Gliricidia sepium in English include: gliricidia, Mexican lilac, mother of cocoa (in India and Ghana), Nicaraguan cocoashade (in Trinidad and Tobago), quickstick (in Guyana and Jamaica), Aaron's rod (in Jamaica), and St. Vincent plum, Madero Negro (in Nicaragua) among other common names.

In Latin America, it is known as cacahuanāntli in Nahuatl; and madre de cacao, madricacao, mata ratón, madriado, or madriago in Spanish in general; palu de sol, piñón cubano, cuchunuc, jelelte, sacyab, xakyaab, muite, and cocuite among other names in Mexico; mata ratón or matarratón in Guatemala, Colombia, and Cuba; cacaguanance or cacahuananche (from the Nahuatl etymon) in Mexico and Guatemala; prendedor or mata ratón in Puerto Rico; madero negro or maderu negru in Nicaragua and Costa Rica; balo in Costa Rica; palu de bala in Panama; palo de hierro in El Salvador; and piñón de Cuba in the Dominican Republic.

The Spanish and Nahuatl names are retained in the Philippines as madre de cacao, madriado, madrecacao, and cacauate (or kakawate). Elsewhere in Southeast Asia, it is known as bunga jepun in Malaysia; gamal or liriksidia in Indonesia; khae farang in Thailand; anh dào gía, sát thu, or hông mai in Vietnam; khê fàlangx or khê nooyz in Laos; and ge li dou (格力豆) in China.

In South Asia, it is known as madri in Telugu; saranga in Bengali; gobbarda mara or gobbaradgidda in Kannada; giripushpa in Marathi; siima konna in Malayalam; and seemai agathi or vivasaaya thegarai in Tamil, and wetahiriya in Sinhala).

Elsewhere, it is also known as agunmaniye in Nigeria; rechesengel in Palau; and mãe-do-cacau in Portuguese.

== Description ==
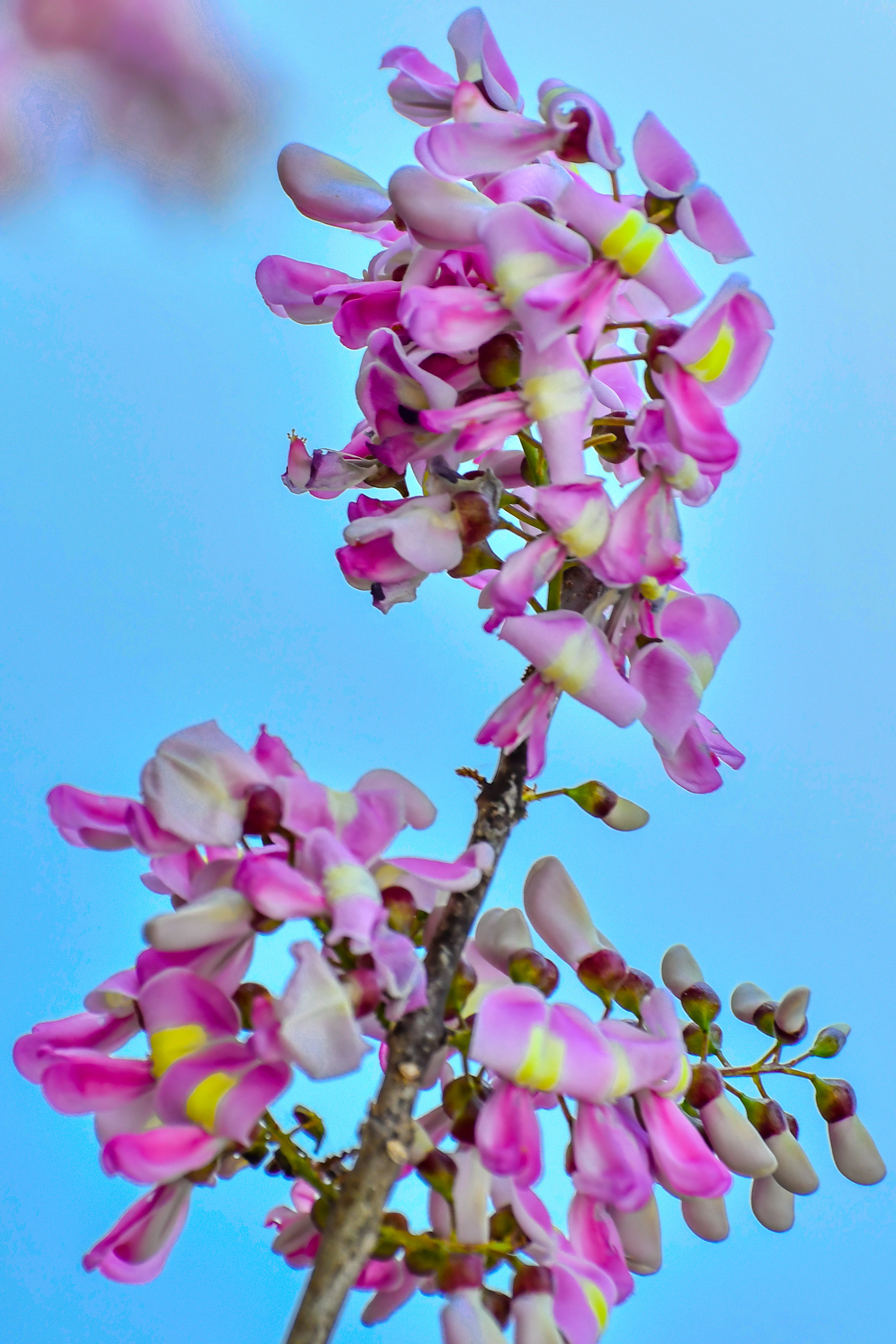
Flower

Gliricidia sepium is a medium-sized tree that grows 10–12 m (33–39 ft) high. The bark is smooth, and its color can range from a whitish gray to deep red-brown. The flowers are located on the end of branches that have no leaves. These flowers have a bright pink to lilac color that is tinged with white. A pale yellow spot is usually at the flower's base. The tree's fruit is a pod about 10–15 cm (4–6 in) long. It is green when unripe and becomes yellow-brown when it reaches maturity. The pod produces four to ten round brown seeds.

== Distribution and spread ==
G. sepium has been cultivated extensively by indigenous American cultures in North, Central, and South America since the pre-Columbian era, which makes it difficult to ascertain its original native distribution. Genetic studies have identified the center of genetic diversity of G. sepium as the dry zones of southern Mexico and northern Central America, which is now generally regarded as its true native range.

G. sepium was first introduced to the Philippines from Mexico via the Manila galleons along with 200 other tropical American plant species from as early as the early 1600s. Their use as a shade tree for cacao, coffee, and tea plantations led to their further spread. These later introductions include the Caribbean before 1850; Sri Lanka in the 1800s; India and Indonesia at around 1900; and West Africa, Uganda, and Kenya in the early 1900s. Other introductions followed in the 20th century and G. sepium now has a pantropical distribution.

G. sepium grows well in acidic soils with a pH of 4.5–6.2. The tree is found on volcanic soils in its native range in Central America and Mexico. However, it can also grow on sandy, clay, and limestone soils.

== Uses ==
G. sepium was spread from its native range throughout the tropics to shade plantation crops such as coffee. Today it is used for many other purposes including live fencing, fodder, firewood, green manure, intercropping, and rat poison. Its use expanded following the widespread defoliation of Leucaena by psyllid in the 1980s. In the charsutri method of paddy cultivation, leaves of glyricidia are incorporated in soil during ploughing.

=== Salinity tolerance and nitrogen fixation ===
The tree possesses high level of Nitrogen fixation and tolerance to salinity.

=== Fodder ===
G. sepium is used as cut and carry forage for cattle, sheep, and goats. Its high protein content allows it to complement low-quality tropical forages. G. sepium can tolerate repeated cutting, every 2 to 4 months depending on the climate. Cutting G. sepium causes it to retain its leaves during the dry season when many forage crops have lost their leaves. In some cases it is the only source of feed during the dry season.

=== Intercropping ===
G. sepium trees are used for intercropping in part because they fix nitrogen in the soil and tolerate low soil fertility, so when they are interplanted with crops they can boost crop yields significantly, without the need of chemical fertilizers.

G. sepium tolerates being cut back to crop height, and can even be coppiced, year after year. When the trees are cut back, they enter a temporary dormant state during which their root systems do not compete for nutrients needed by the crops, so the crops can establish themselves.

These properties also enable G. sepium to be used as green manure.

=== Soil stabilization ===
G. sepium is a fast-growing ruderal species that takes advantage of slash and burn practices in its native range. Because it is easily propagated and grows quickly, it is also planted to prevent topsoil erosion in the initial stages of reforesting denuded areas, and as an intermediate step to be taken before introducing species that take longer to grow.

=== Shade trees ===
The common name madre de cacao (literally "mother of cacao" in Spanish) used in Central America and the Philippines is in reference to its traditional use as shade trees for cocoa tree plantations.

=== Other ===
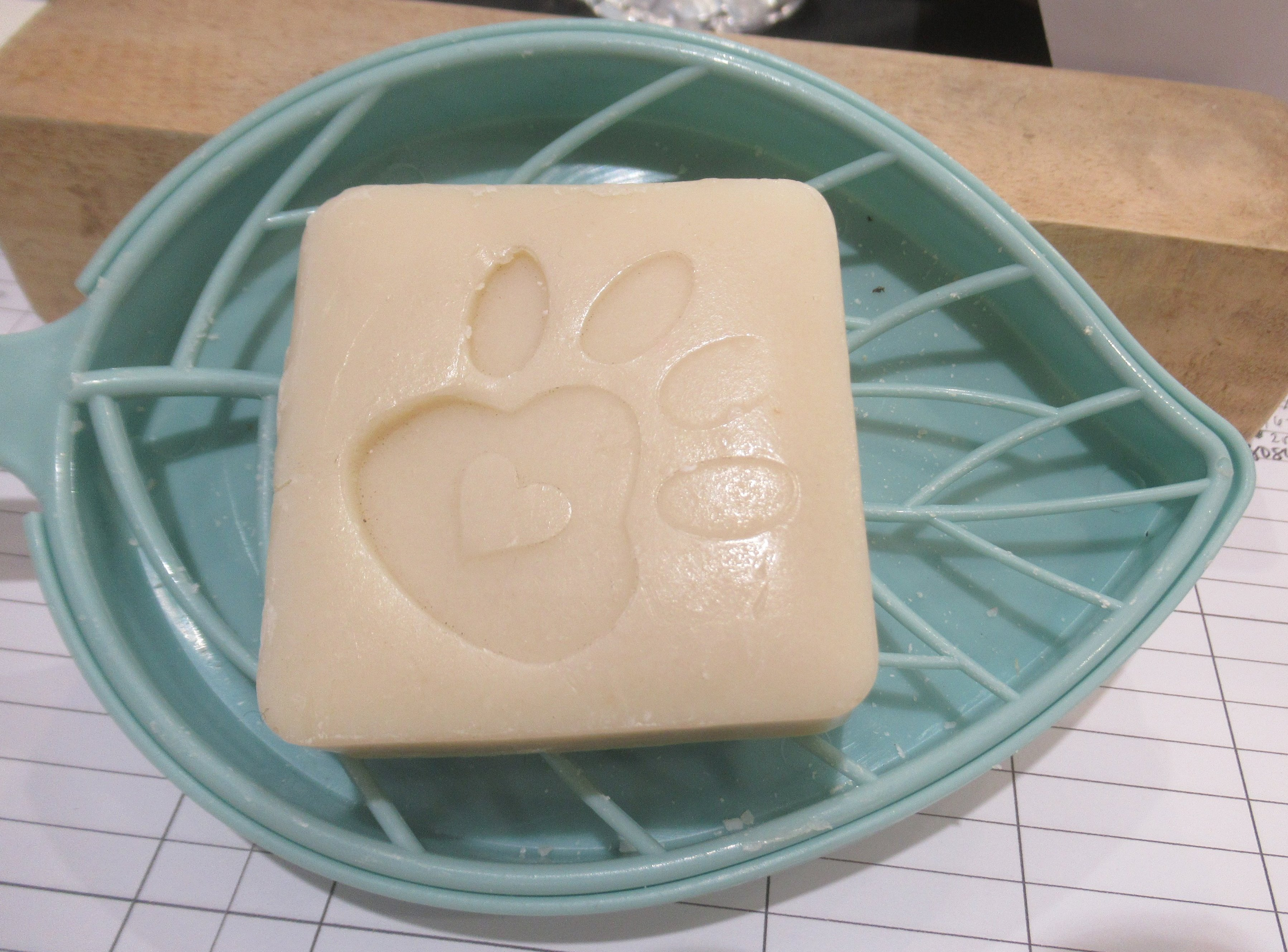
Pet shampoo with VCO and mother of cocoa

G. sepium is widely used in the form of poles for live fencing in Cuba, other islands and India. This is one of the best plants used for traditional live fencing to protect agriculture and fruit bearing plantations from animals such as goats, cow, and buffalo. As a Caribbean native, G. sepium has traditionally been used for live fencing in Cuba.

As in India, during the recent past one could see many living fences around mango and cashew orchards and agricultural properties in Goa, Maharashtra and Karnataka, erected with G. sepium and tied with bamboo rafters.

G. sepium is also used for its insect repellent properties. Farmers in Latin America often wash their livestock with a paste made of crushed G. sepium leaves to ward off torsalos (botflies). In the Philippines, the extract obtained from its leaves is made into anti-mange dog shampoo.

== Limitations ==
G. sepium seems to be toxic to non-ruminants. The generic name Gliricidia means "mouse killer" in reference to the traditional use of its toxic seeds and bark as rodenticides.

Some palatability challenges have been reported; animals seem to refuse the leaves on the basis of smell, but this depends on management and geography.

Another limitation is frost intolerance and the lack of adaptation to a cool season: it is a tropical plant. Generally, the G. sepium tree can withstand a minimum temperature of 17 °F (−8 °C).

In terms of cultivation, it requires the presence of pollinators to set seeds, but is often propagated with stem cuttings despite it giving shallow roots. The seeds are often hard, smooth and (water impermeable when mature and dry, but a light scratching against coarse sandpaper or a rough cement floor can make them all take up water fast to germinate. Further, it has invasive potential: its swift propagation has caused it to be considered a weed in Jamaica.

Until now G. sepium has remained free of serious diseases; only a number of insect problems are reported in exotic environments, but there are issues with defoliation under humid conditions.

In late April, 2023 on the island of Montserrat, BWI, the Black bean bug (Brachyplatys subaeneus) was observed infesting this plant.

== Names in other languages ==
Language	Name
Marathi	गिरीपुष्प, ऊंदीरमारी, खताचे-झाड
Konkani	सारया झाड
Kannada	ಗೊಬ್ಬರದ ಗಿಡ
Malayalam	ശീമക്കൊന്ന,പത്തല്, സെമ്മക്കൊന്ന
Tamil	சீமை அகத்தி
Tulu	ಈಟ್ದ ಮರ
Sinhala	වැටහිරියා, ගිනිසීරියා, ලාඩාප්ප, මකුලත,ඇල්බීසියා,වැටහිර, ලංචි
Thai	แคฝรั่ง
Myanmar	ပဲချယ်ရီ၊ အညာချယ်ရီ၊ ကြွက်သေပင်၊ သင်္ဘောငုစပ်

In Indonesia, Gliricidia sepium is known as gamal given by researcher R. Soetarjo Martoatmodjo in 1958 after Gamal Abdel Nasser, whose name also reminded him of the Arabic name for 'camel' (i.e. جَمَل jamal)– in the hopes that it would help Indonesia's wastelands heal and its other ecosystems endure just "like a camel crossing the Sahara desert"; it has also been backronymed by some farmers as the anti-Malaysia slogan Ganjang Malaysia or "Down with Malaysia".
