= Lennea viridiflora =

Conservation status
- Least Concern (IUCN 3.1)

Scientific classification
- Kingdom: Plantae
- Clade: Tracheophytes
- Clade: Angiosperms
- Clade: Eudicots
- Clade: Rosids
- Order: Fabales
- Family: Fabaceae
- Subfamily: Faboideae
- Genus: Lennea
- Species: L. viridiflora

Binomial name
- Lennea viridiflora Seem.

Species of legume

Lennea viridiflora is a species of legume in the family Fabaceae. Its distribution extends the length of Central America, from the border with Colombia to Mexico. It is found in Costa Rica, El Salvador, Mexico, Nicaragua, and Panama in lowland rainforest. It is threatened by habitat loss.

== Endangerment ==
The species has become endangered due to logging and encroaching agriculture and settlements, which have reduced the size of the species' habitat; it is scarcely found outside protected areas.
