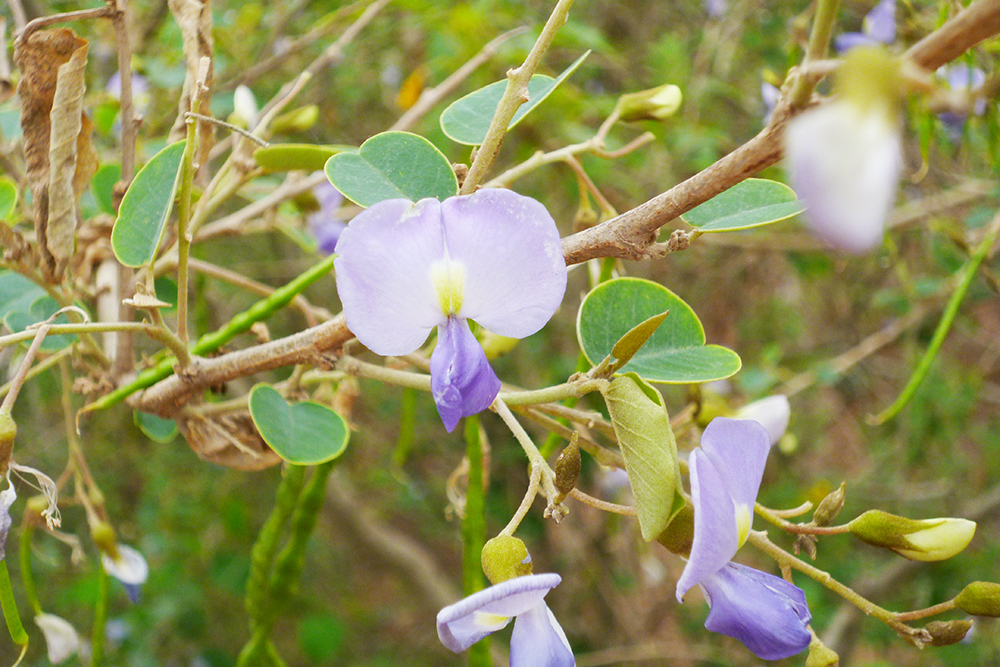

Conservation status
- Vulnerable (IUCN 2.3)

Scientific classification
- Kingdom: Plantae
- Clade: Tracheophytes
- Clade: Angiosperms
- Clade: Eudicots
- Clade: Rosids
- Order: Fabales
- Family: Fabaceae
- Subfamily: Faboideae
- Genus: Poissonia
- Species: P. hypoleuca

Binomial name
- Poissonia hypoleuca (Speg.) Lillo

Synonyms
- Chiovendaea hypoleuca Speg.; Coursetia hypoleuca (Speg.) Lavin

= Poissonia hypoleuca =

Species of legume

Poissonia hypoleuca, synonym Coursetia hypoleuca, is a species of legume in the family Fabaceae. It is found in Argentina and Bolivia. It is threatened by habitat loss.
