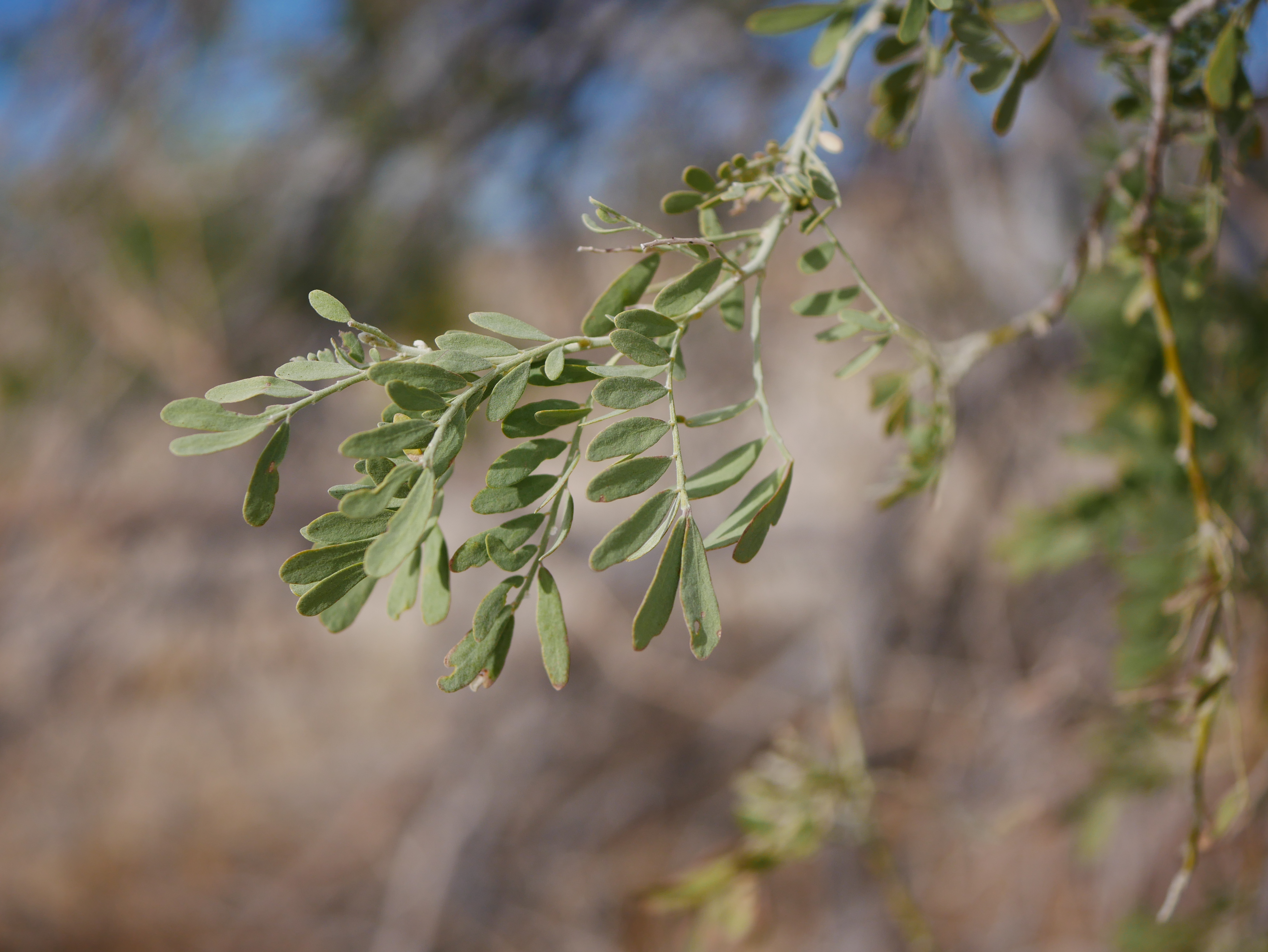

Conservation status
- Near Threatened (IUCN 3.1)

Scientific classification
- Kingdom: Plantae
- Clade: Embryophytes
- Clade: Tracheophytes
- Clade: Angiosperms
- Clade: Eudicots
- Clade: Rosids
- Order: Fabales
- Family: Fabaceae
- Subfamily: Faboideae
- Tribe: Robinieae
- Genus: Olneya; A.Gray
- Species: O. tesota

Binomial name
- Olneya tesota A.Gray, 1854
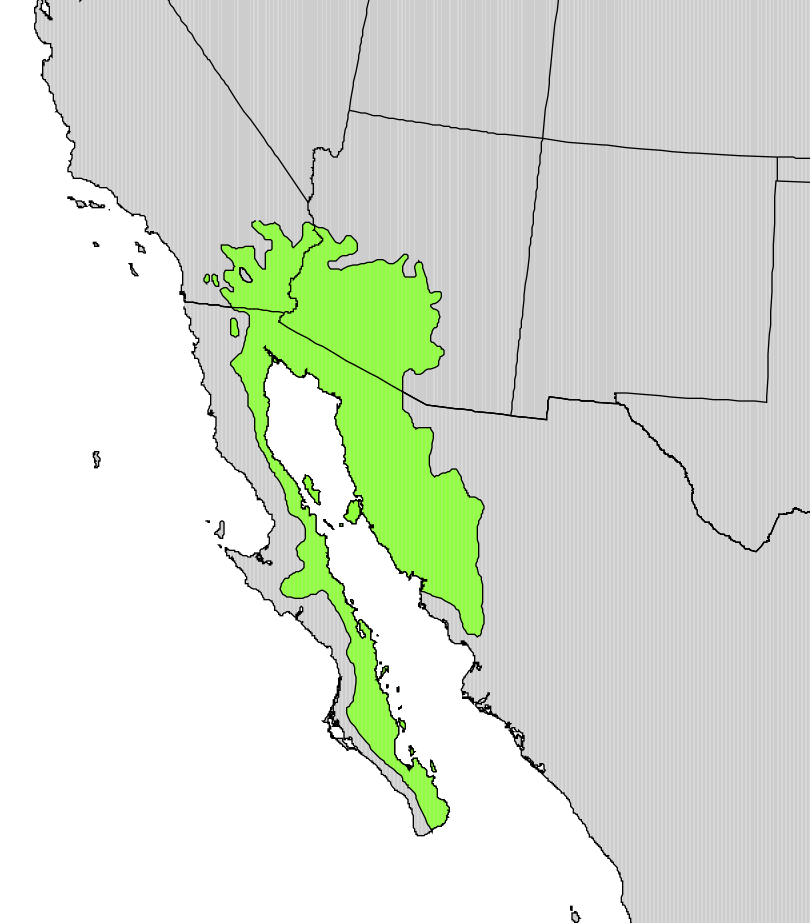
- Natural range

Synonyms
- Tesota Müll.Berol., W.G.Walpers, Ann. Bot. Syst. 4: 479 (1857)

= Olneya =

Genus of legumes

Olneya tesota is a perennial flowering tree of the family Fabaceae, legumes (peas, beans, etc.), which is commonly known as ironwood, desert ironwood, or palo fierro in Spanish. It is the only species in the monotypic genus Olneya. This tree is part of the western Sonoran Desert in Mexico and United States.

== Description ==
The desert ironwood grows as a bush or tree, reaching heights of about 10 metres (33 feet) and average trunk diameters of about 60 centimetres (24 inches). Exceptionally, in larger protected washes it can reach greater height and a more massive trunk.

In younger trees, the bark is gray, shiny, and smooth; in older trees the bark is broken open. The tree is evergreen, but can lose its leaves if temperatures fall below 2 °C (36 °F). In continual drought conditions the leaves will be lost.

The leaves are bluish-green and pinnately compound. They are arranged on a petiole, 15 cm (6 in) long, with 6–9 leaflets (or variously up to 15, with seven opposite and one terminal), each measuring 0.7 to 2.5 cm (1/4 to 1 in). At the base of each pinnate leaf petiole grow two thorns, each about 1 cm (3/8 in) long.

Bloom time occurs in late April/May to June. Flowers are of five unequal petals, in colors of medium purple, magenta-red, or white to pale pink. Seedpods are 5–8 cm (2–3 in) long and light reddish brown when seedpods have ripened.

Two other species, Parkinsonia florida (blue palo verde) and Acacia constricta (catclaw acacia), have similar light red/brownish seedpods. Catclaw acacia's seedpods are shorter and J-shaped.

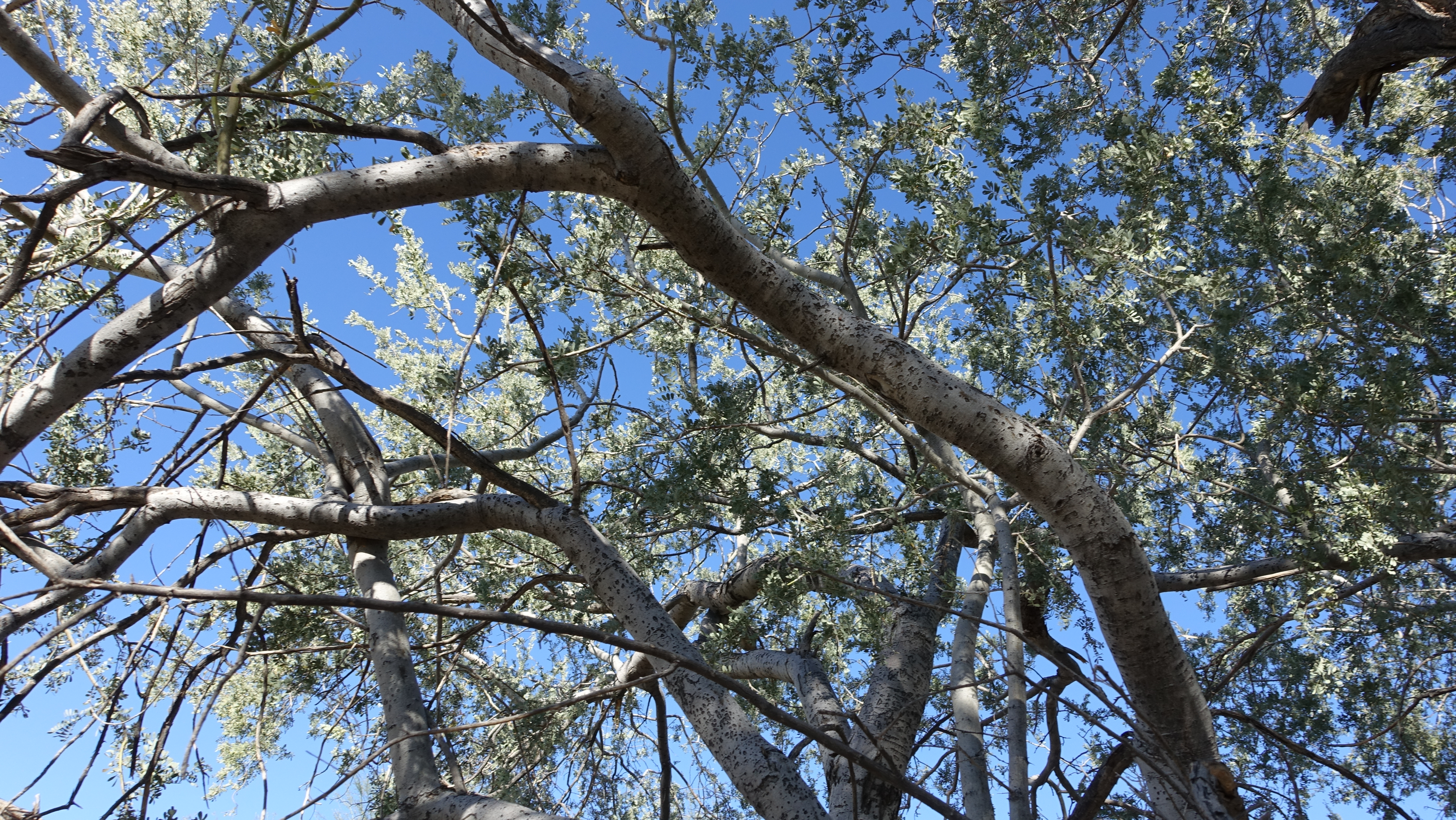
View from below a specimen

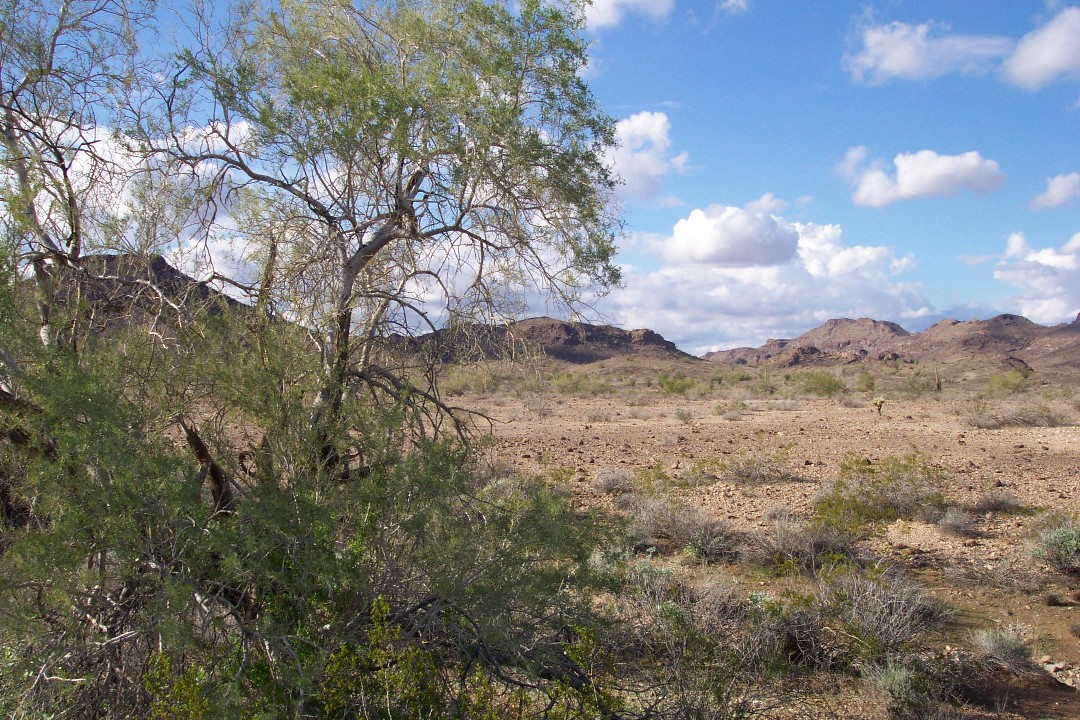
Tree in Sonoran Desert

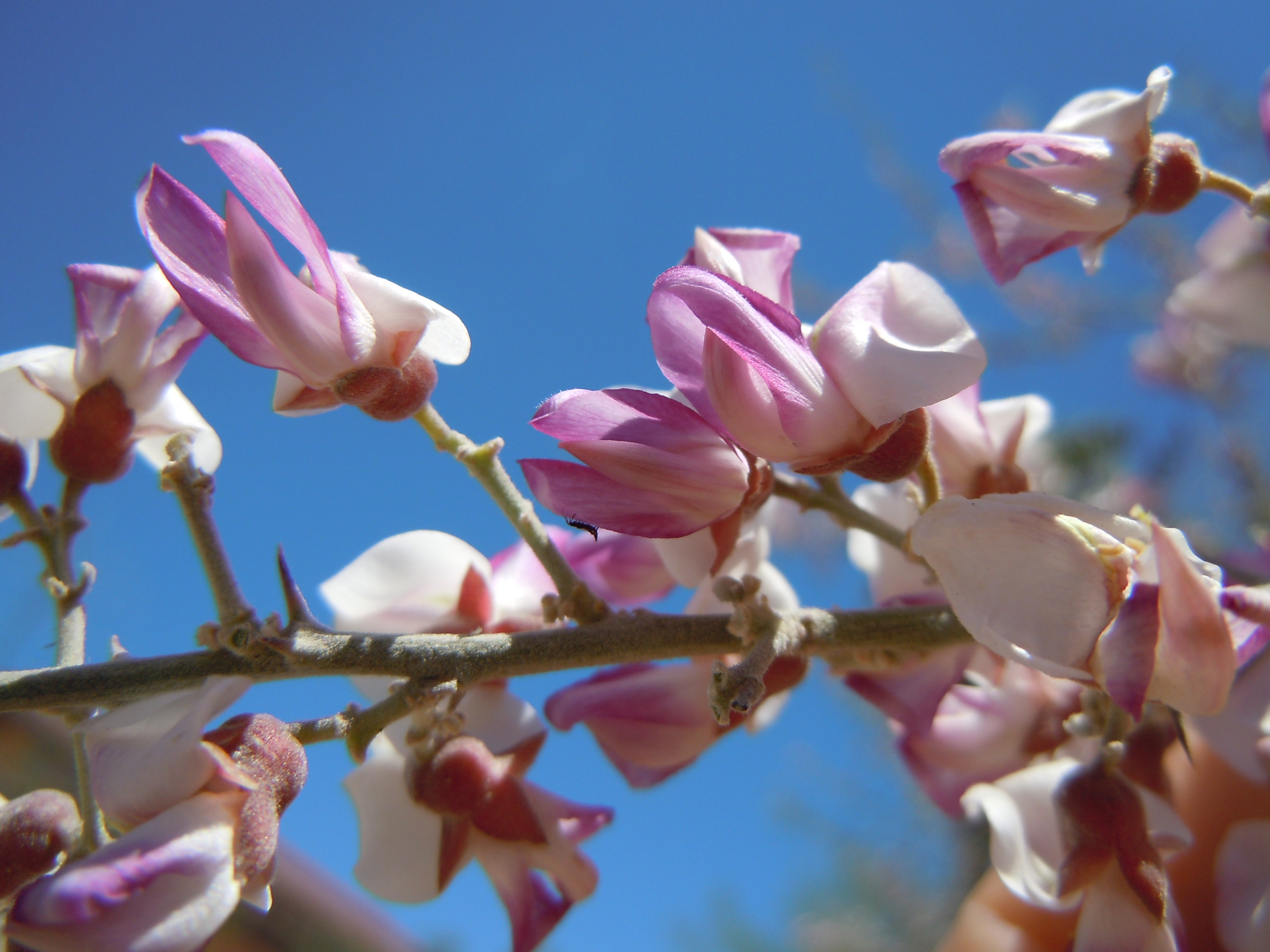
Closeup of inflorescence

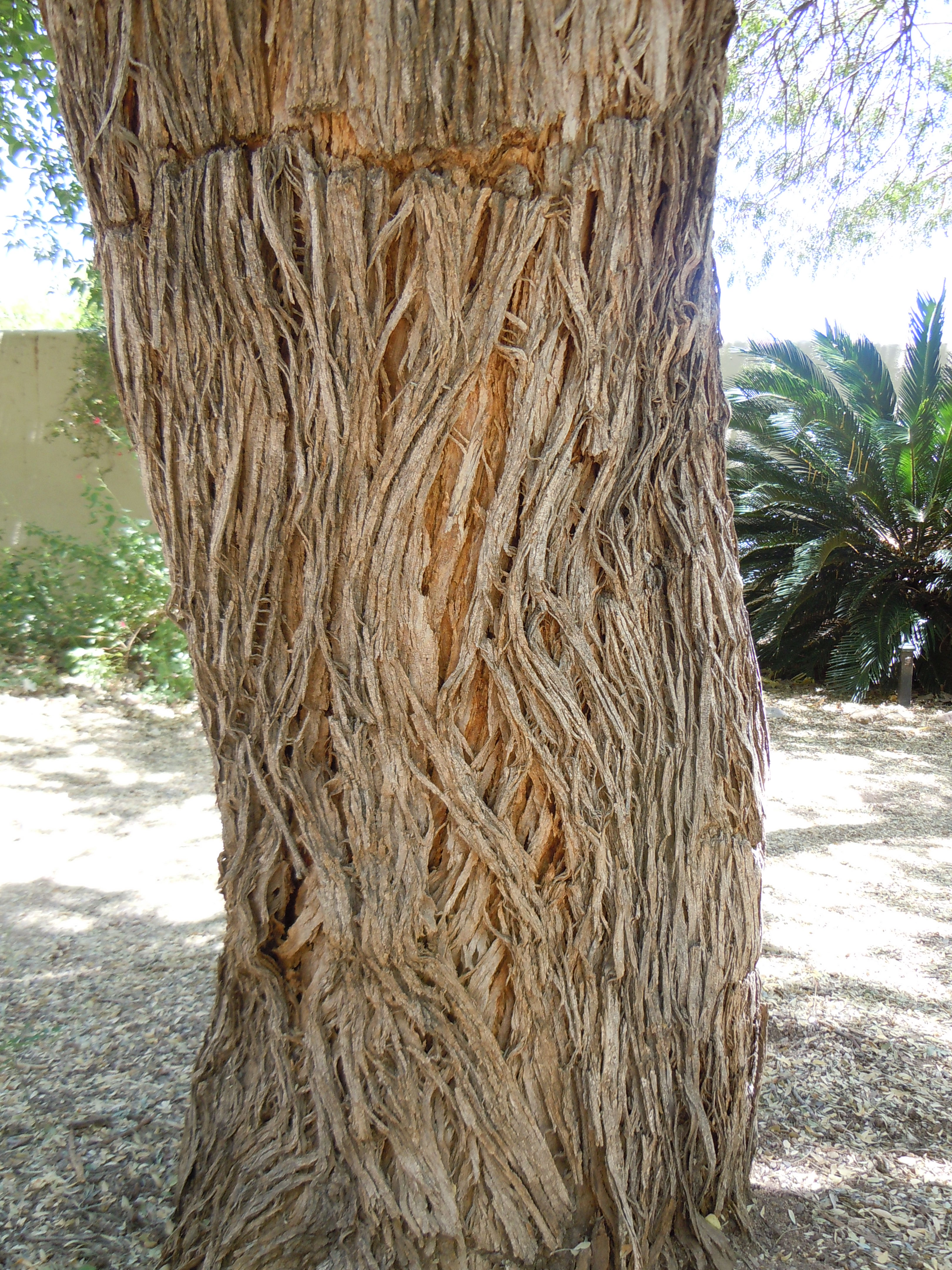
The bark on the main stems of older trees becomes furrowed or shredded and loses the stipular spines.

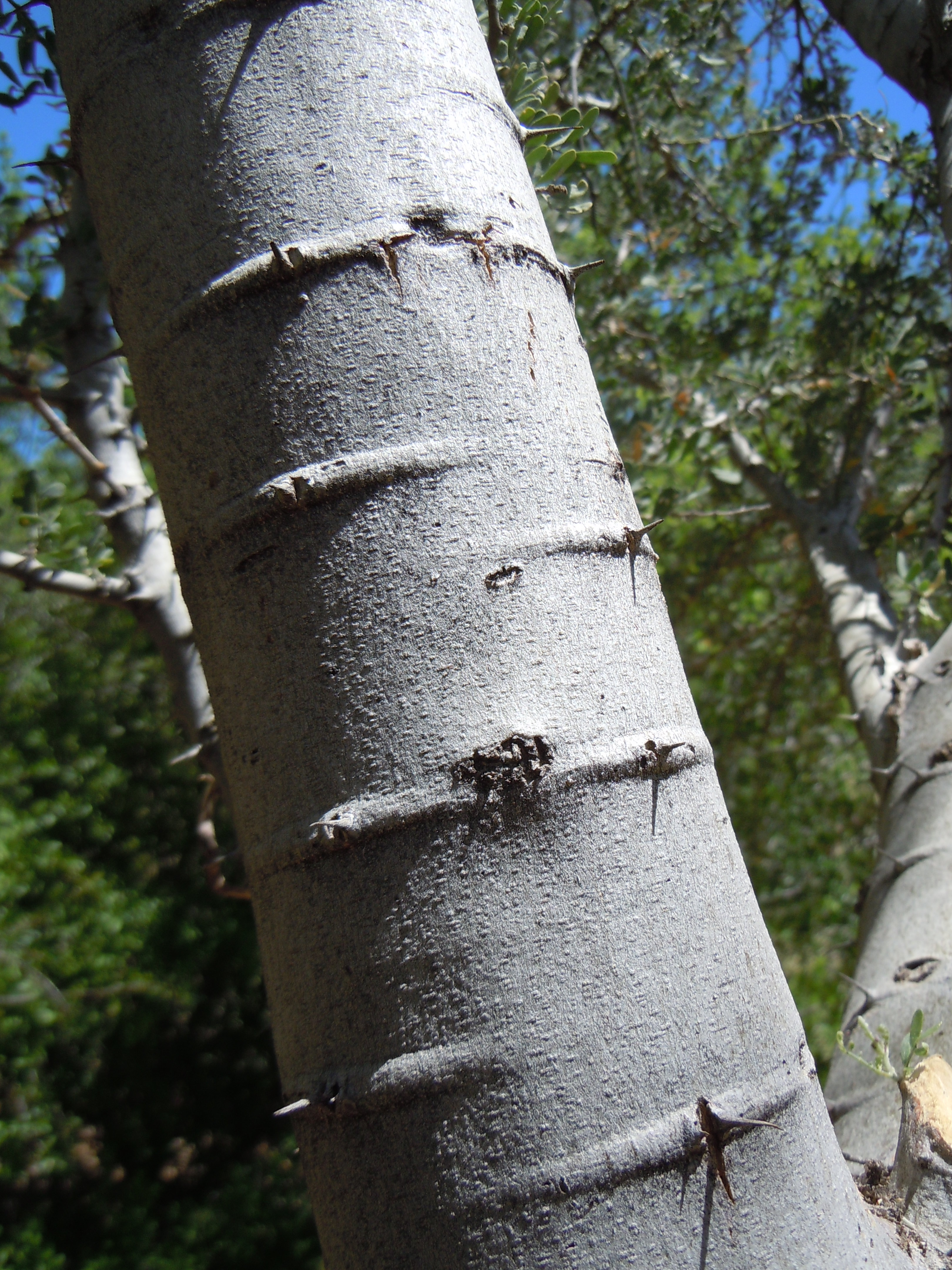
The smooth gray bark commonly retains the stipular spines produced during the original branch formation.

== Taxonomy ==
The genus name of Olneya is in honour of Stephen Thayer Olney (1812–1878), who was an American manufacturer and botanist with expertise in the genus Carex.

The genus was circumscribed by Asa Gray in Pl. Nov. Thurb. page 328 in 1854.

== Distribution and habitat ==
The species is native to the Southwestern United States and extreme northwestern Mexico in the Baja California Peninsula and the Sonoran Desert. Within Mexico its range includes the states of Baja California Sur and Baja California, on the Gulf of California side east of the cordillera ranges, and Sonora state west of the Sierra Madre Occidental cordillera, in the south approaching the northern border of northern Sinaloa state. In the Southwestern US its range includes the Colorado Desert of southeast Southern California, a part of the Sonoran Desert, and western and southern Arizona. Olneya does not range into the higher-elevation, colder, southeast of Arizona's Sonoran Desert region, nor into the sky islands of the Madrean Sky Islands region.

== Ecology ==
The pleasant-tasting sap is consumed by bees and hummingbirds. The silky-flycatcher or phainopepla pose a problem, for when they consume mistletoe berries and excrete them in the cracks of Olneya tesota, the mistletoe will parasitize its host.

=== An indicator species ===
Olneya tesota is an indicator species of the Sonoran Desert region. The Sonoran Desert has at least one other species with an identical north–south, and east–west range. The seasonally migrating lesser long-nosed bat follows the bloom season of various species from south to north and extends into the same regions of the Sonoran Desert as Olneya. The bat ranges from southern Baja California del Sur and north into the Southwestern US. O. tesota associates such as the saguaro cactus are major nectar and fruit sources for this bat.

In the north, both species define the Colorado Desert sub-region of the Sonoran Desert surrounding the northern end of the Gulf of California; further south in the Baja Peninsula the sub-division is defined as the Vizcaino Desert.

The winter and permanent range of the bat extend into the northern countries of Central America.

== Uses ==
The seeds can be eaten by first being roasted.

Olneya ironwood is very hard and heavy. Its density is greater than water and thus sinks; it does not float downstream in washes and must be moved by current motion.

Due to its considerable hardness, processing desert ironwood is difficult. Final treatment of the wood with solutions can also be difficult because of its high density. As a result, mass processing of this wood is difficult, and most of its commercial usages are artisanal, such as durable wooden sculptures as well as knife handles.

== Conservation ==
Olneya tesota was classified as Near Threatened by the International Union for Conservation of Nature (IUCN) in 2018. It is threatened by felling for wood carving and fuel, urbanization causing habitat loss and invasive species such as buffelgrass, which contributes to frequent and intense wildfires in areas where it is established.

== Culture ==
Ironwood Forest National Monument in south-central Arizona is named for O. tesota.

== See also ==
- Mexican ironwood carvings
