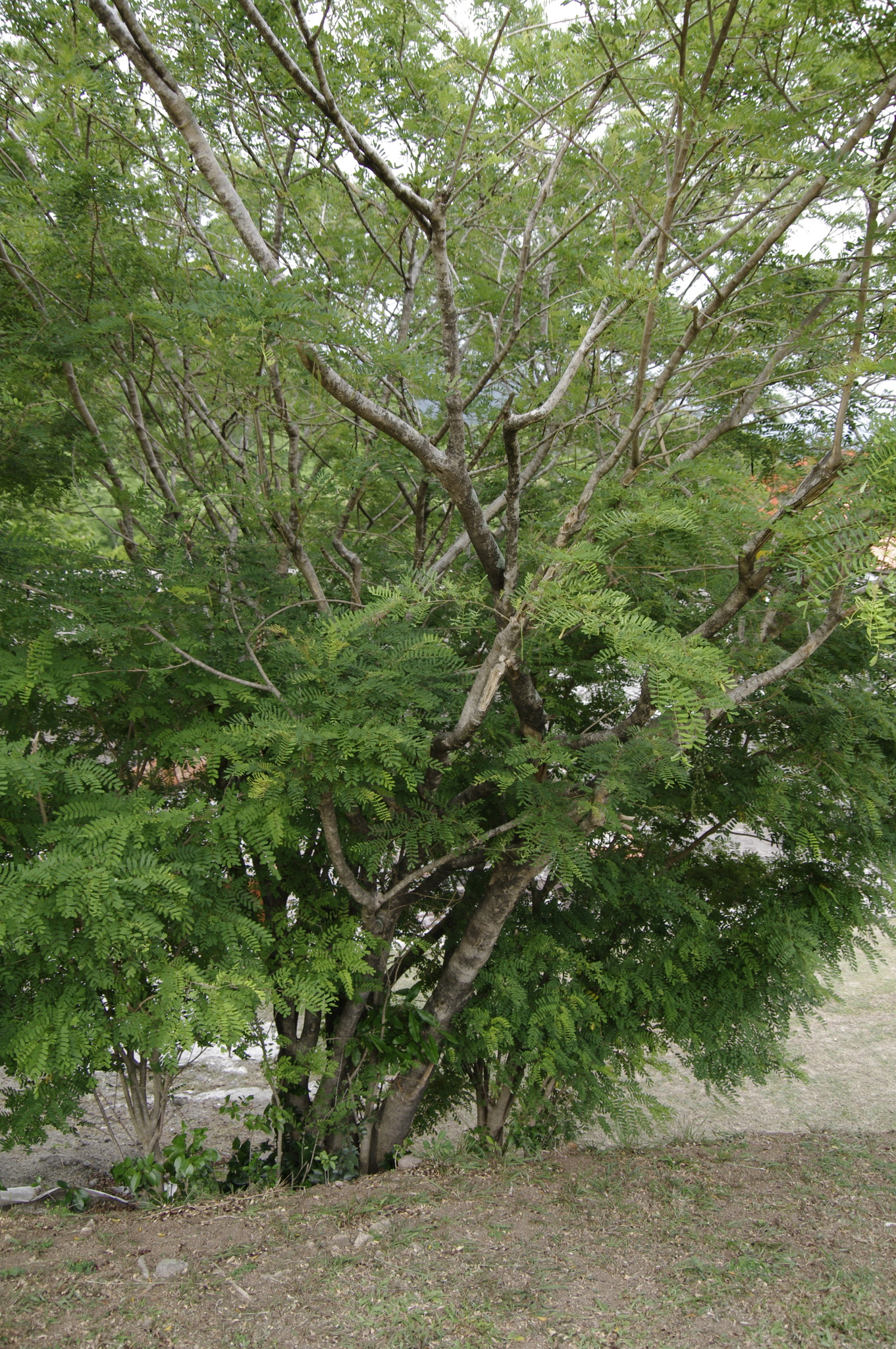

Scientific classification
- Kingdom: Plantae
- Clade: Tracheophytes
- Clade: Angiosperms
- Clade: Eudicots
- Clade: Rosids
- Order: Fabales
- Family: Fabaceae
- Subfamily: Faboideae
- Genus: Poitea
- Species: P. carinalis

Binomial name
- Poitea carinalis (Griseb.) Lavin

Synonyms
- Sabinea carinalis Griseb.

= Poitea carinalis =

Species of legume

Poitea carinalis (also known as Carib wood or bwa kwaib) is a species of flowering plant in the legume family Fabaceae that is endemic to Dominica, where it is the national flower.

== Description ==
It is a small deciduous tree or dry shrub and when in flower, usually February–April (occasionally up to June, depending on dry season rains), an individual P. carinalis can be seen from a mile away as the entire tree turns brilliant red, the flowers have the typical pea form with a long keel.

The flowers appear just before the new leaves unfurl and attract an abundance of pollinators (such as insects, hummingbirds and bananaquits), but last for only a short time. Out of flower, it has 6-8 pairs of leaflets and a flattened pod.

== Uses ==
Scattered individuals occur throughout the dry shrub and are occasionally planted elsewhere and since it has been adopted as the national flower of Dominica, people are now encouraged to plant it more widely.
