= Poissonia weberbaueri =

Scientific classification
- Kingdom: Plantae
- Clade: Tracheophytes
- Clade: Angiosperms
- Clade: Eudicots
- Clade: Rosids
- Order: Fabales
- Family: Fabaceae
- Subfamily: Faboideae
- Genus: Poissonia
- Species: P. weberbaueri

Binomial name
- Poissonia weberbaueri (Harms) Lavin

Species of plant

Poissonia weberbaueri is a flowering plant in the genus Poissonia endemic to Peru.

== Conservation status ==
This species is considered Threatened by the Kew database.
