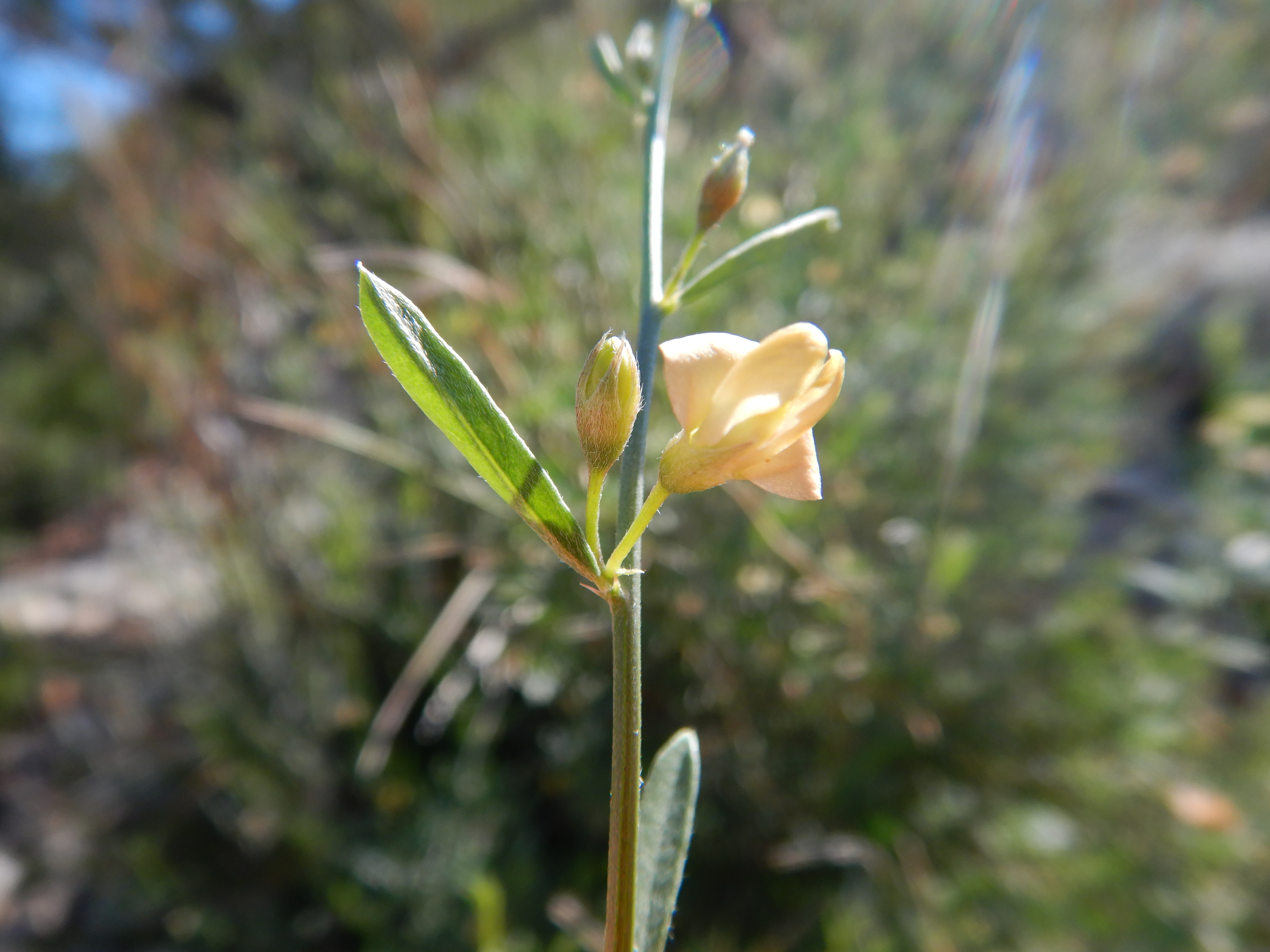
- Genistidium dumosum

Conservation status
- Critically Imperiled (NatureServe)

Scientific classification
- Kingdom: Plantae
- Clade: Tracheophytes
- Clade: Angiosperms
- Clade: Eudicots
- Clade: Rosids
- Order: Fabales
- Family: Fabaceae
- Subfamily: Faboideae
- Tribe: Robinieae
- Genus: Genistidium; I.M.Johnst.
- Species: G. dumosum

Binomial name
- Genistidium dumosum I.M.Johnst.

= Genistidium =

Genus of legumes

Genistidium is a monotypic genus of flowering plants in the legume family, Fabaceae. It belongs to the subfamily Faboideae. It contains the single species Genistidium dumosum, the brushpea. It is native to Texas and adjacent Mexico.
