= Hebestigma =

Scientific classification
- Kingdom: Plantae
- Clade: Embryophytes
- Clade: Tracheophytes
- Clade: Angiosperms
- Clade: Eudicots
- Clade: Rosids
- Order: Fabales
- Family: Fabaceae
- Subfamily: Faboideae
- Tribe: Robinieae
- Genus: Hebestigma; Urb. (1900)
- Species: H. cubense

Binomial name
- Hebestigma cubense (Kunth) Urb. (1900)

Synonyms
- Gliricidia cubensis (Kunth) C.Wright (1869); Gliricidia latifolia Griseb. (1866); Gliricidia platycarpa Griseb. (1866); Gliricidia sagrae Benth. ex Urb. (1900), pro syn.; Hebestigma cubense var. latifolium (Griseb.) Urb. (1900); Robinia cubensis Kunth (1824)

Genus of legumes

Hebestigma is a genus of flowering plants in the legume family, Fabaceae. It belongs to the subfamily Faboideae. It includes a single species, Hebestigma cubense, a tree endemic to Cuba.
