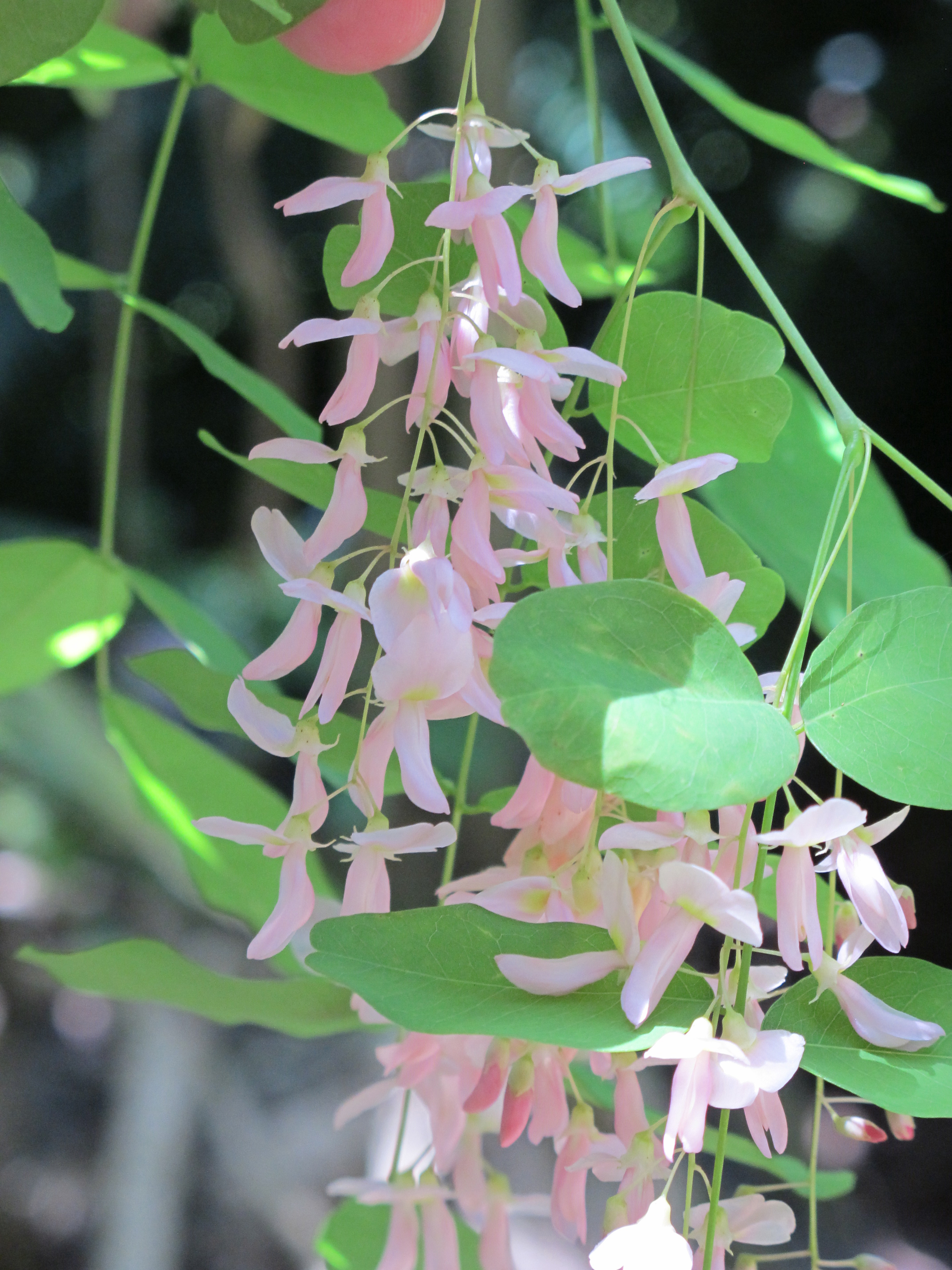
- Lennea melanocarpa

Scientific classification
- Kingdom: Plantae
- Clade: Tracheophytes
- Clade: Angiosperms
- Clade: Eudicots
- Clade: Rosids
- Order: Fabales
- Family: Fabaceae
- Subfamily: Faboideae
- Tribe: Robinieae
- Genus: Lennea; Klotzsch (1842)

Species
- Lennea melanocarpa (Schltdl.) Vatke ex Harms; Lennea modesta (Standl. & Steyerm.) Standl. & Steyerm.; Lennea viridiflora Seem.

Synonyms
- Calomorphe Kuntze ex Walp. (1842)

= Lennea =

Genus of legumes

Lennea is a genus of legume in the family Fabaceae. It contains three species native to central and southern Mexico and Central America.

- Lennea melanocarpa (Schltdl.) Vatke ex Harms
- Lennea modesta (Standl. & Steyerm.) Standl. & Steyerm.
- Lennea viridiflora Seem.
