= Mexican ironwood carvings =

Mexican artistic tradition

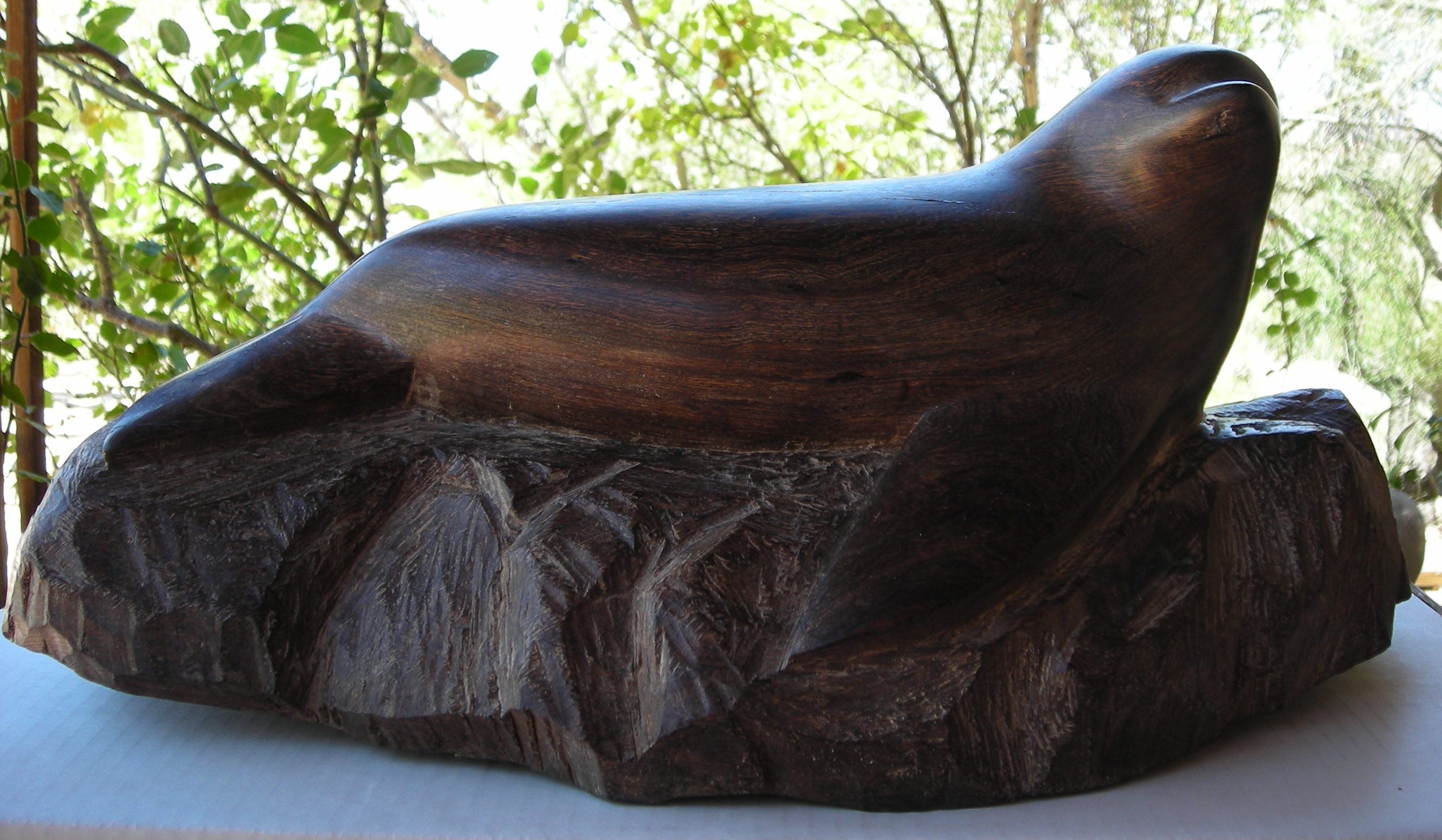
Seri ironwood carving

Mexican ironwood carving is a Mexican tradition of carving the wood of the Olneya tesota tree, a Sonora Desert tree commonly called ironwood (palo fierro in Spanish).

Olneya tesota is a slow growing important shade tree in northwest Mexico and the southwest U.S. The wood it produces is very dense and sinks in water. Traditionally, people used it for firewood and charcoal, and some carving.

The tradition of carving it began with the Seri indigenous people of the state of Sonora. In the mid-20th century, the Seri had to move from their traditional home on Tiburon Island to the mainland, around the same time tourism was developing in Kino Bay. The first to carve ironwood for sale was Jose Astorga, who began with other materials and ironwood for utilitarian items. In the 1960s, he began carving ironwood figures, which sold well to tourists, and others followed. The craft began to be widely distributed in the 1970s, with non Seris beginning to carve, introducing animals from other areas as subjects, and the use of power tools. Carving, charcoal production and loss of habitat has put pressure on the ironwood tree, which the Mexican government declared protected in 1994. Carving is still permitted, but the price of the wood has increased and production has decreased.

== Ironwood tree ==
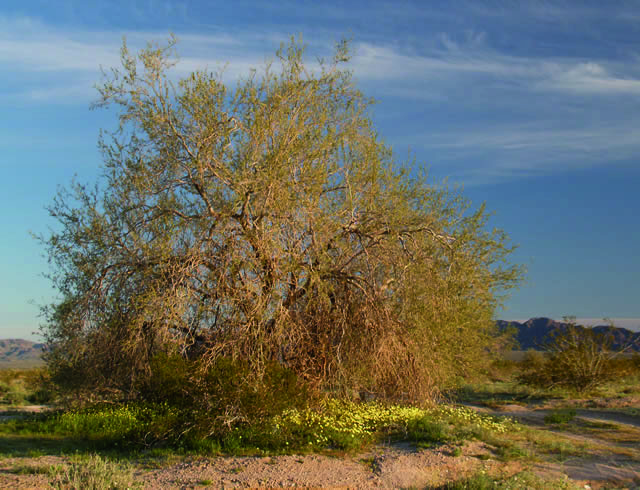
Olneya tesota, the Ironwood tree

The ironwood tree is considered native to the Sonora Desert as it is found only the states of Sonora, Baja California and Baja California Sur in Mexico and Arizona and California in the United States. Olneya tesota is the slowest growing and the tallest in the Sonora Desert, with specimens able to reach heights of up to fifteen feet, if near relatively stable sources of water. It accounts for a fifth of the desert’s biomass, mostly owing to the density of its wood. The shade provided by these trees is essential for a number of other desert plants and animals.

The species is protected by the Mexican government because of its overexploitation and deterioration of habitat. The plant is not considered in danger of extinction, as its range is over millions of hectares and with thousands of trees, however its slow growth and use in handcrafts and firewood puts it at some risk. In 1992, before it received government protection, 21,000 tons of the wood was converted into charcoal. Ninety percent of this charcoal was exported from Sonora to the United States. Today, carving is not the biggest danger to the tree but rather the conversion of desert into pasture and cropland. Other efforts to conserve the tree include the establishment of organizations such as Pro Palo Fierro, to develop ways to use the resource in a sustainable manner. Since the plant is found in two countries, efforts involving the US have included organizations such as Conservation International and the Desert Botanical Garden in Phoenix.

== Use of the wood, including carving ==
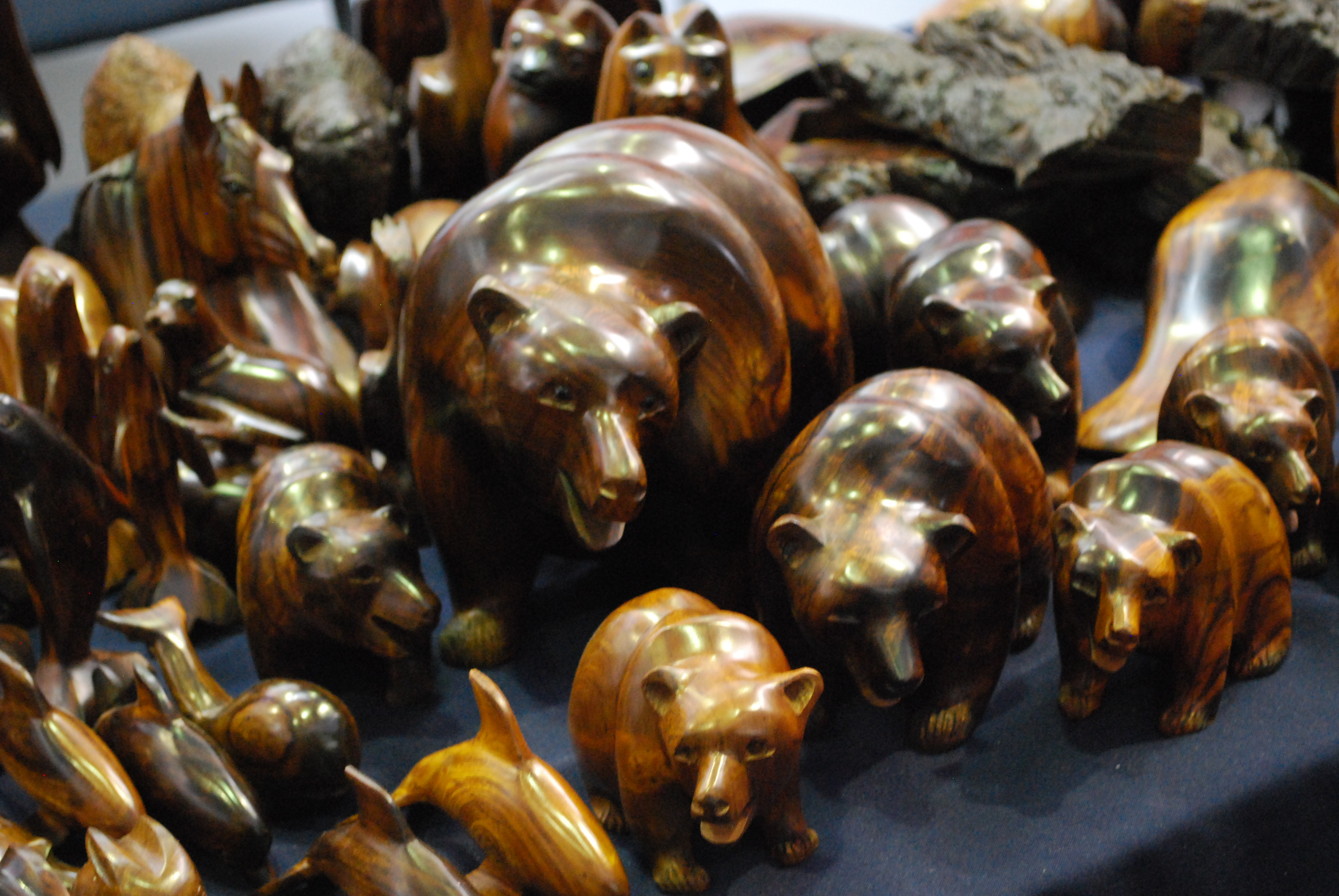
Ironwood bears at the FONART expo in Mexico City

Ironwood is similar to ebony, as it is dark, dense and very hard; its grain is very straight. For this reason there are few air bubbles and unlike other woods, ironwood sinks in water. Before the carving of ironwood figures, this wood was used for firewood, the production of charcoal and the carving of items such as harpoons, other tools, musical instruments and toys. Today, the wood’s main use in handcrafts is the creation of carved figures. These are mostly sold in the United States and Mexico and earn about a million dollars a year, far more than it did as the basis of charcoal.

Two groups carve the wood. The first are the Seri, who have done so for decades. Only an estimated 500 Seri still live in Mexico, divided into four major clans. They are semi-nomadic, and generally shun agriculture, animal domestication and extended contact with outsiders. They are concentrated on Tiburon Island and towns like Punta Chueca on the mainland. The carvings are probably the best known of the Seri crafts and are still produced by hand and on a small scale. Seri craftsmen prefer to work on wood from trees that are already dead, such as those struck by lightning or dried out for other reasons. They chop off a trunk or branch with an ax, and carve pieces into shape using a rasp or coarse file. They smooth the wood by scraping it with a piece of glass, polish it with desert sand, then coat it with a thin layer of wax. Originally, they used wax from turtles, but today they use shoe wax. For subjects, carvers typically choose animals in the Seri world—such as turtles, dolphins, eagles, lizards, crabs, and coyotes. Styles vary from simple lines to the inclusion great detail and adornment.

The second group of producers is made up of town and city dwellers from Sonora and Baja California, who began carving after the figures became commercially popular. The latter group produces the figures in grand quantities due to their access to power tools. These families can produce between forty and fifty pieces per day, most of which they sell to wholesalers in Nogales, Sonora. Most of these are then sold in the United States. This has put the Seri at a disadvantage in the market, with their share shrinking. Today there are fewer than fifteen Seri carvers. The carvers total use about 5,000 tons of wood per year for the craft. The development of the carving has been driven by consumer and tourist demand, including the use of asymmetry and abstract forms. Some tourists think a more "primitive" looking carving looks more "authentic" than finer work. Association of the Seri with the craft is still important to its sale and many non Seri falsely put "Handmade by Seri" stickers on their works.

== History ==
The craft originated with the Seri people as a way to earn money from tourists. In the first half of the 20th century, the Seri were mostly confined to Tiburon Island, coming into Kino Bay seasonally to sell firewood, which included ironwood. In the mid 20th century, the traditional Seri economy was disrupted by shrimping in the Gulf of California, which reduced the sea species the Seri needed for food. In the late 1950s, tourism in the area took off in the Kino Bay area. These two developments, along with the island’s status as an ecological reserve prompted the Seri to move to the mainland to communities such as Desemboque and Punta Chueca. Selling handcrafts, including baskets and jewelry as well as the carvings, has become a vital source of income.

The first ironwood carver was Jose Astorga, who began by carving animals of pumice stone. His first work with ironwood is utilitarian, bowls, spoons, etc. His first decorative items were created between 1963 and 1964, focusing on sea animals that were popular with tourists. His daughter later became the first to sign her work.

Commercial wax and other sanding methods were introduced in 1968. That same year, University of Arizona students began to make monthly trips to the Seri villages to buy the carvings, greatly increasing their popularity. In the 1970s, the Mexican government began to promote and widely distribute the carvings leading to about half of the adult population engaged in the craft.

Non Seris began carving in the 1970s, as the popularity of the craft grew, and introduced motorized cutting and carving methods in the 1980s as well as carving of animals not part of the Seri world. In 1974, BANFOCO became a carving wholesaler with the aim of providing the Seris with a regular income. In the 1980s, distribution extended into Canada and Japan. The growth of the craft however, along with continued use of the wood for charcoal, started to decrease the supply of wood. In 1994 the ironwood tree became protected by the Mexican government, allowing its use only for carving. By this time, the craft had spread into various parts of Sonora as well as the Baja California peninsula. However, most ironwood carving is still done in Kino Bay, Caborca, Magdalena de Kino, Punta Chueca, Puerto Libertad, Puerto Peñasco, Santa Ana and Sonoyta. The scarcity of the wood has caused its price to rise and production to fall. This in turn has made already existing pieces more valuable.
