= Poissonia =

Scientific classification
- Kingdom: Plantae
- Clade: Tracheophytes
- Clade: Angiosperms
- Clade: Eudicots
- Clade: Rosids
- Order: Fabales
- Family: Fabaceae
- Subfamily: Faboideae
- Tribe: Robinieae
- Genus: Poissonia; Baill. (1870)

Species
- See text.

Synonyms
- Chiovendaea Speg. (1916); Neocracca Kuntze (1898)

Genus of legumes

Poissonia is a genus of flowering plants in the legume family, Fabaceae. It includes five species of trees, shrubs, and herbs native to Peru, Bolivia, and northwestern Argentina. Typical habitats include seasonally-dry tropical and subtropical forest and shrubland, generally along river and stream banks, and open vegetation in arid areas. It belongs to the subfamily Faboideae, tribe Robinieae.

== Species ==
As of September 2023, Plants of the World Online accepted the following species:

- Poissonia eriantha (Benth.) Hauman
- Poissonia heterantha (Griseb.) Lavin
- Poissonia hypoleuca (Speg.) Lillo
- Poissonia orbicularis (Benth.) Hauman
- Poissonia weberbaueri (Harms) Lavin
