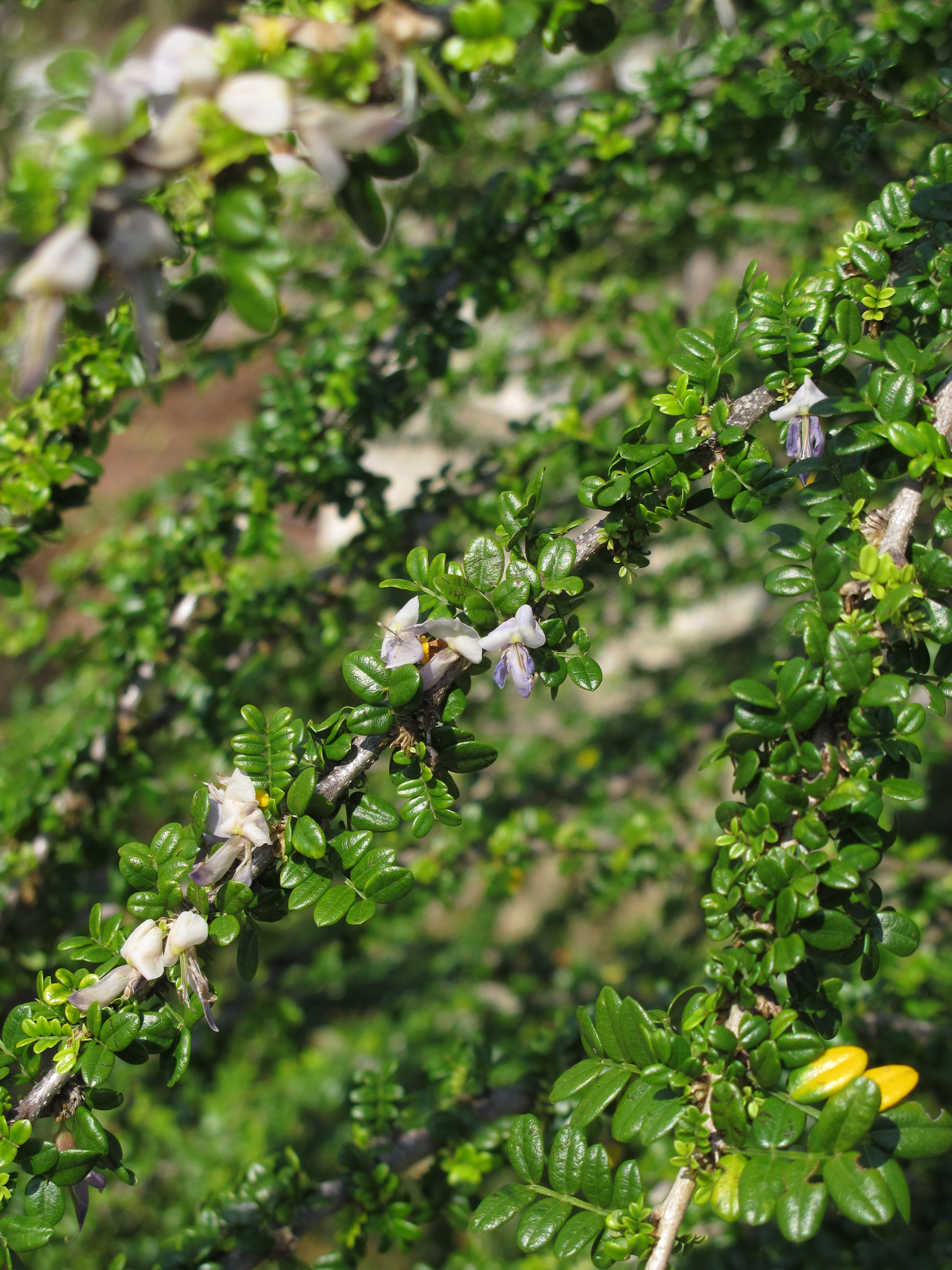
- Poitea florida

Scientific classification
- Kingdom: Plantae
- Clade: Tracheophytes
- Clade: Angiosperms
- Clade: Eudicots
- Clade: Rosids
- Order: Fabales
- Family: Fabaceae
- Subfamily: Faboideae
- Tribe: Robinieae
- Genus: Poitea; Vent. (1807)

Species
- 15; see text

Synonyms
- Bembicidium Rydb. (1920); Cajalbania Urb. (1928); Corynella DC. (1825); Corynitis Spreng. (1827); Notodon Urb. (1899); Sabinea DC. (1825); Sauvallella Rydb. (1924); Toxotropis Turcz. (1846); Vilmorinia DC. (1825)

= Poitea =

Genus of legumes

Poitea is a genus of flowering plants in the family Fabaceae. It includes 15 species of trees and shrubs native to the Caribbean islands of Cuba, Hispaniola, Puerto Rico, the Virgin Islands, and Dominica. Typical habitats include seasonally-dry tropical lowland to montane forest, thicket, and thorn scrub, often in secondary vegetation and on steep slopes or roadsides. It belongs to the subfamily Faboideae.

== Species ==
15 species are accepted.

- Poitea campanilla DC.
- Poitea carinalis (Griseb.) Lavin
- Poitea cubensis (Rydb.) J.L.Gómez
- Poitea dubia (Poir.) Lavin
- Poitea florida (Vahl) Lavin
- Poitea galegoides Vent.
- Poitea glyciphylla (Poir.) Urb.
- Poitea gracilis (Griseb.) Lavin
- Poitea immarginata (C.Wright) Lavin
- Poitea longiflora Urb.
- Poitea multiflora (Sw.) Urb.
- Poitea paucifolia (DC.) Lavin
- Poitea punicea (Urb.) Lavin
- Poitea savannarum (Britton & P.Wilson) J.L.Gómez
- Poitea wrightiana J.L.Gómez
