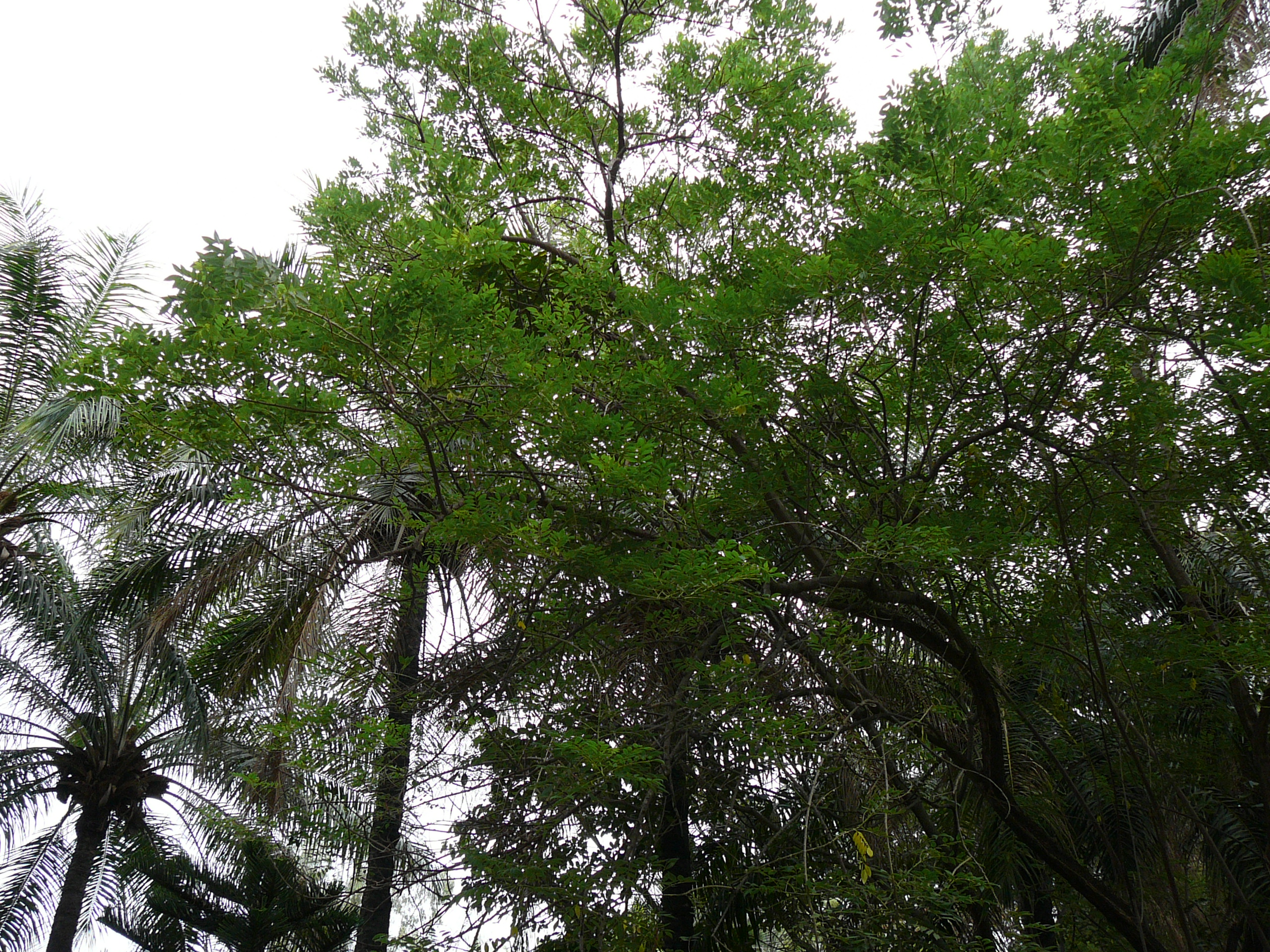
- Gliricidia sepium

Scientific classification
- Kingdom: Plantae
- Clade: Tracheophytes
- Clade: Angiosperms
- Clade: Eudicots
- Clade: Rosids
- Order: Fabales
- Family: Fabaceae
- Subfamily: Faboideae
- Tribe: Robinieae
- Genus: Gliricidia; Kunth (1842)

Synonyms
- Hybosema Harms (1923); Yucaratonia Burkart (1969)

= Gliricidia =

Genus of legumes

Gliricidia is a genus of flowering plants in the legume family, Fabaceae and tribe Robinieae. Its native range is Mexico to Peru, but Gliricidia sepium has been widely introduced to other tropical zones.

The species G. sepium is a small, deciduous, ornamental tree, cultivated and used for a variety of purposes in tropical regions. The genus name Gliricidia means "mouse killer" in reference to the traditional use of the toxic seeds and bark of G. sepium as rodenticides. The tree is leafless when in flower and bears fruits during April and May in India and countries with same climate. The small flowers (barely 2 cm long) are pale pink and they are borne in dense clusters on bare twigs. Flowers fade to white or a faint purple with age. The flowers attract a lot of bees and some lycaenid butterflies—particularly the Peablue Lampides boeticus and other native birds.

== Species ==
The following species are accepted:

- Gliricidia brenningii (Harms) Lavin
- Gliricidia ehrenbergii (Schltdl.) Rydb.
- Gliricidia maculata (Kunth) Steud.
- Gliricidia robusta (M.Sousa & Lavin) Lavin
- Gliricidia sepium (Jacq.) Kunth
