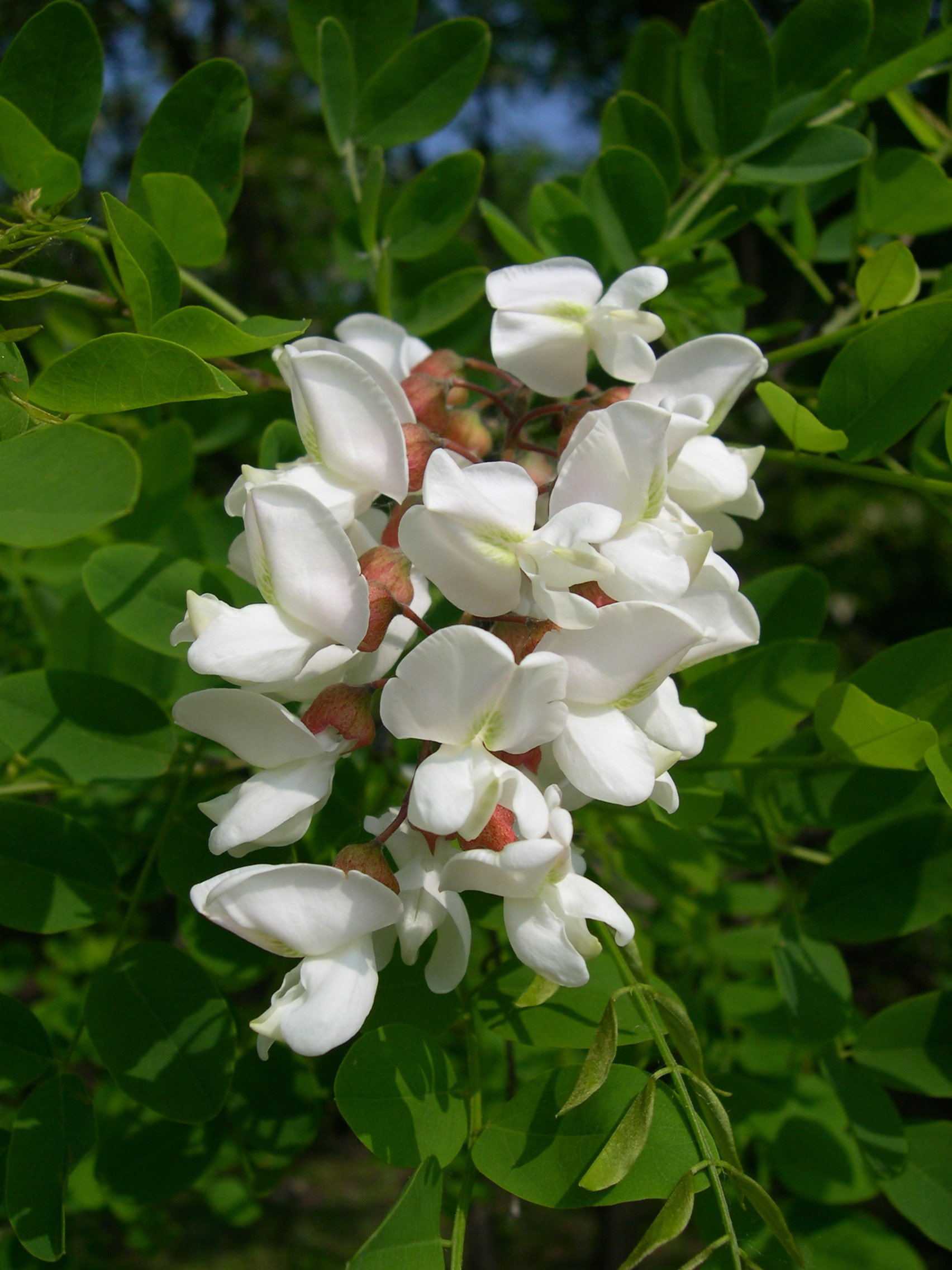
- Robinia pseudoacacia

Scientific classification
- Kingdom: Plantae
- Clade: Tracheophytes
- Clade: Angiosperms
- Clade: Eudicots
- Clade: Rosids
- Order: Fabales
- Family: Fabaceae
- Subfamily: Faboideae
- Clade: Meso-Papilionoideae
- Clade: Non-protein amino acid-accumulating clade
- Clade: Hologalegina
- Clade: Robinioids
- Tribe: Robinieae (Benth.) Hutch.

= Robinieae =

Tribe of legumes

The tribe Robinieae is one of the subdivisions of the plant family Fabaceae and the currently unranked taxon Robinioids.

The following genera are recognized by the USDA:

- Coursetia DC. 1825
- Genistidium I. M. Johnst. 1941
- Gliricidia Kunth 1823
- Hebestigma Urb. 1900
- Lennea Klotzsch 1842
- Olneya A. Gray 1855
- Peteria A. Gray 1852
- Poissonia Baill. 1870
- Poitea Vent. 1807
- Robinia L. 1753
- Sphinctospermum Rose 1906
