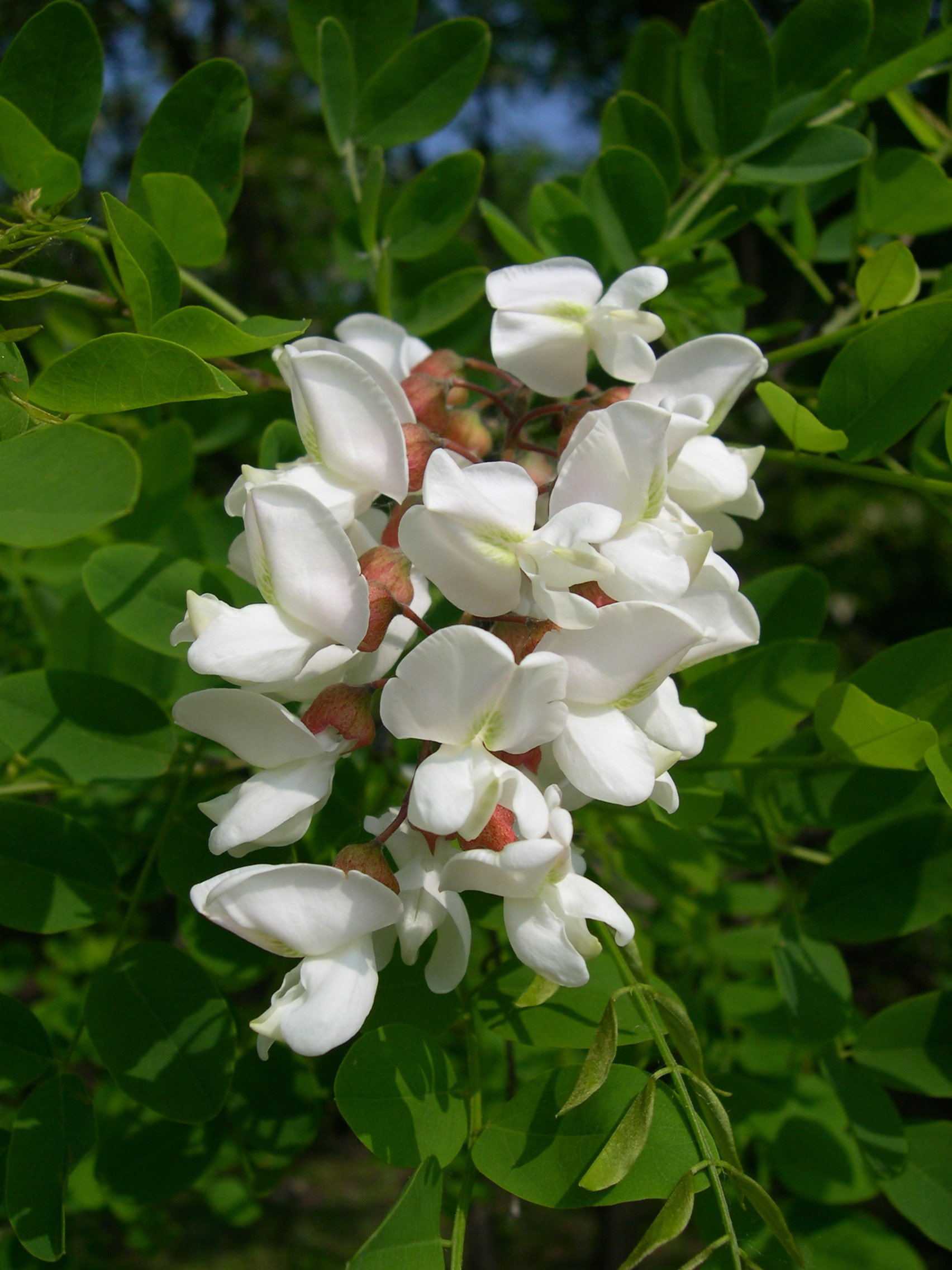
- Robinia pseudoacacia

Scientific classification
- Kingdom: Plantae
- Clade: Tracheophytes
- Clade: Angiosperms
- Clade: Eudicots
- Clade: Rosids
- Order: Fabales
- Family: Fabaceae
- Subfamily: Faboideae
- Clade: Meso-Papilionoideae
- Clade: Non-protein amino acid-accumulating clade
- Clade: Hologalegina
- Clade: Robinioids

Tribes
- Loteae; Sesbanieae; Robinieae

= Robinioids =

Clade of legumes

The robinioids are one of the four major clades (along with the genisitoids, dalbergioids and millettioids) in subfamily Faboideae of the plant family Fabaceae (Leguminosae). It is composed of the traditional tribes Loteae, Sesbanieae and Robinieae. It is a large and important clade that is distributed in mostly temperate areas. Species in this clade share a unique determinate root nodule structure. The clade is predicted to have diverged from the other legume lineages 48.3±1.0 million years ago (in the Eocene).

== History ==
Only two tribes (Loteae and Robinieae) were traditionally included in clade robinioids. Lavin & Schrire later included Sesbanieae into clade robinioids. Tribe Robinieae is primarily in tropical and arid temperate areas, containing mostly trees and shrubs of New World. Tribe Loteae are herbaceous and small shrubby legumes closely related with Old World tribe Galegeae.

Loteae was originally a smaller group of legumes until later in 1994 Polhill merged Loteae and tribe Coronilleae and greatly expanded Loteae. Sesbanieae is a tribe with single genus Sesbania, which was originally placed under tribe Robinieae.

== Systematics ==
Loteae and Robinieae are traditionally grouped under clade robinioids: these two major groups are primarily found in Europe, North America, and South America. Sesbanieae was a group included in 2005.

Monophyly:

Monophyly of tribe Loteae: molecular data have shown support for monophyly with the exception for New World Lotus. Monophyly of Old World Lotus is moderately supported whereas New World Lotus is considered as paraphyletic.

Monophyly of tribe Robinieae and Sesbanieae is strongly supported. Sesbanieae only has one genus Sesbania.

Intratribal relationship: Sesbanieae is either sister to Loteae, or sister to the rest of clade robinioids.
