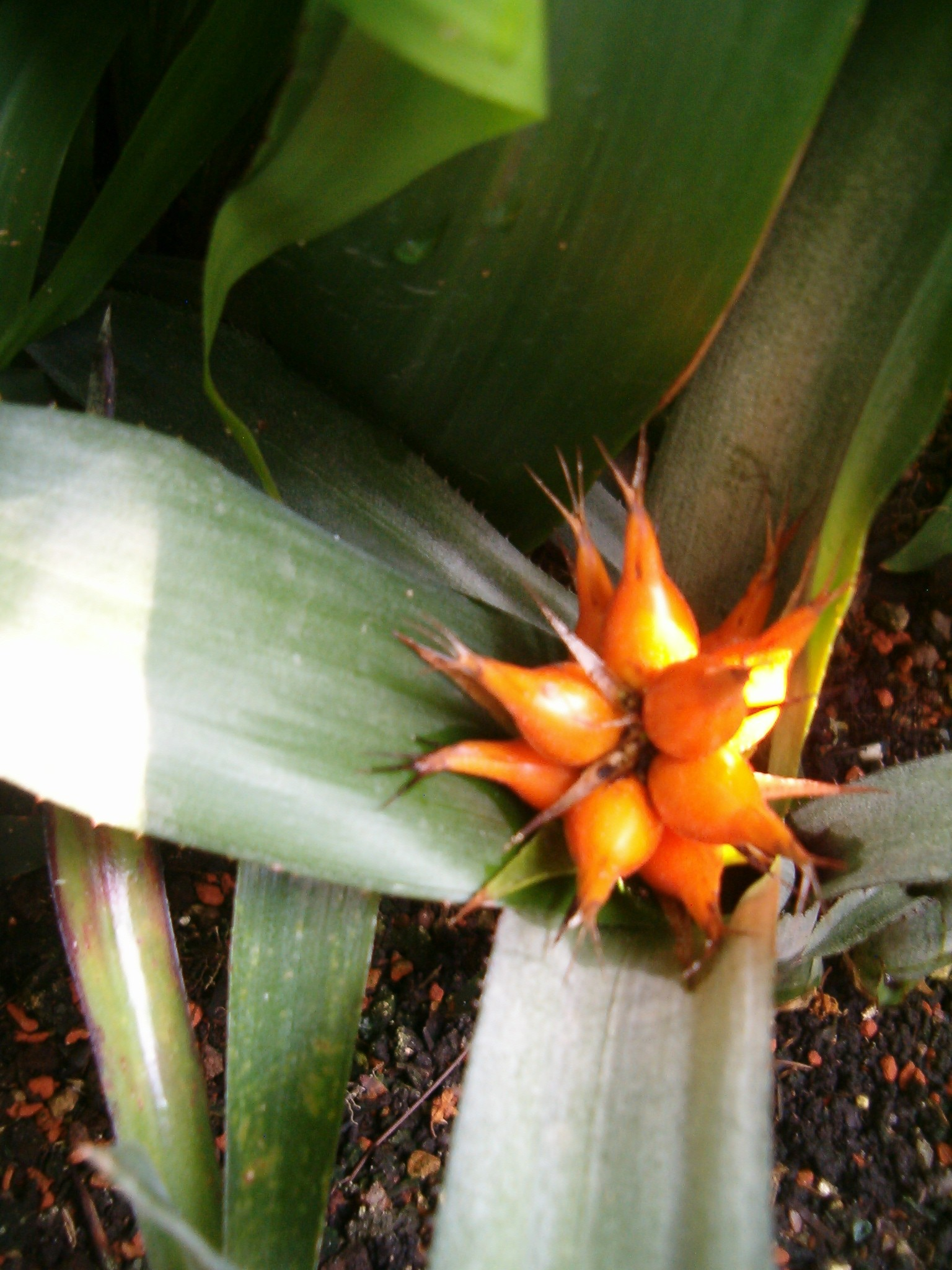
- Ronnbergia petersii

Scientific classification
- Kingdom: Plantae
- Clade: Tracheophytes
- Clade: Angiosperms
- Clade: Monocots
- Clade: Commelinids
- Order: Poales
- Family: Bromeliaceae
- Subfamily: Bromelioideae
- Genus: Ronnbergia; E.Morren & André

= Ronnbergia =

Genus of flowering plants

Ronnbergia is a genus in the plant family Bromeliaceae, subfamily Bromelioideae. Native to South and Central America, this genus was named for Auguste Ronnberg, Belgian Director of Agriculture and Horticulture in 1874.

== Species ==
As of November 2022, Plants of the World Online accepted 20 species.

- Ronnbergia aciculosa (Mez & Sodiro) Aguirre-Santoro, syns. Ronnbergia nidularioides H.E.Luther, Aechmea aciculosa Mez & Sodiro
- Ronnbergia allenii (L.B.Sm.) Aguirre-Santoro, syn. Ronnbergia petersii L.B.Sm
- Ronnbergia campanulata Gilmartin & H. Luther - Ecuador
- Ronnbergia columbiana É.Morren - Colombia, Peru
- Ronnbergia deleonii L.B. Smith - Colombia, Ecuador
- Ronnbergia drakeana (André) Aguirre-Santoro
- Ronnbergia explodens L.B. Smith - Panama, Ecuador, Peru
- Ronnbergia fraseri (Baker) Aguirre-Santoro
- Ronnbergia germinyana (Carrière) Aguirre-Santoro
- Ronnbergia hathewayi L.B. Smith - Costa Rica, Panama
- Ronnbergia involucrata (André) Aguirre-Santoro
- Ronnbergia killipiana L.B. Smith - Colombia, Ecuador
- Ronnbergia maidifolia Mez - Colombia, Panama
- Ronnbergia morreniana Linden & André - Colombia, Ecuador
- Ronnbergia subpetiolata (L.B.Sm.) Aguirre-Santoro
- Ronnbergia tonduzii (Mez & Pittier) Aguirre-Santoro
- Ronnbergia veitchii (Baker) Aguirre-Santoro
- Ronnbergia viridispica (Aguirre-Santoro & Betancur) Aguirre-Santoro
- Ronnbergia weberbaueri (Harms) Aguirre-Santoro
- Ronnbergia wuelfinghoffii (E.Gross) Aguirre-Santoro

Formerly included

- Ronnbergia brasiliensis E.Pereira & I.A.Penna → Wittmackia brasiliensis (E.Pereira & I.A.Penna) Aguirre-Santoro
- Ronnbergia carvalhoi Martinelli & Leme → Wittmackia carvalhoi (Martinelli & Leme) Aguirre-Santoro - Bahia
- Ronnbergia neoregelioides Leme → Wittmackia neoregelioides (Leme) Aguirre-Santoro - Bahia
- Ronnbergia marantoides L.B.Sm. → Lymania marantoides (L.B.Sm.) Read
- Ronnbergia silvana Leme → Wittmackia silvana (Leme) Aguirre-Santoro - Bahia
