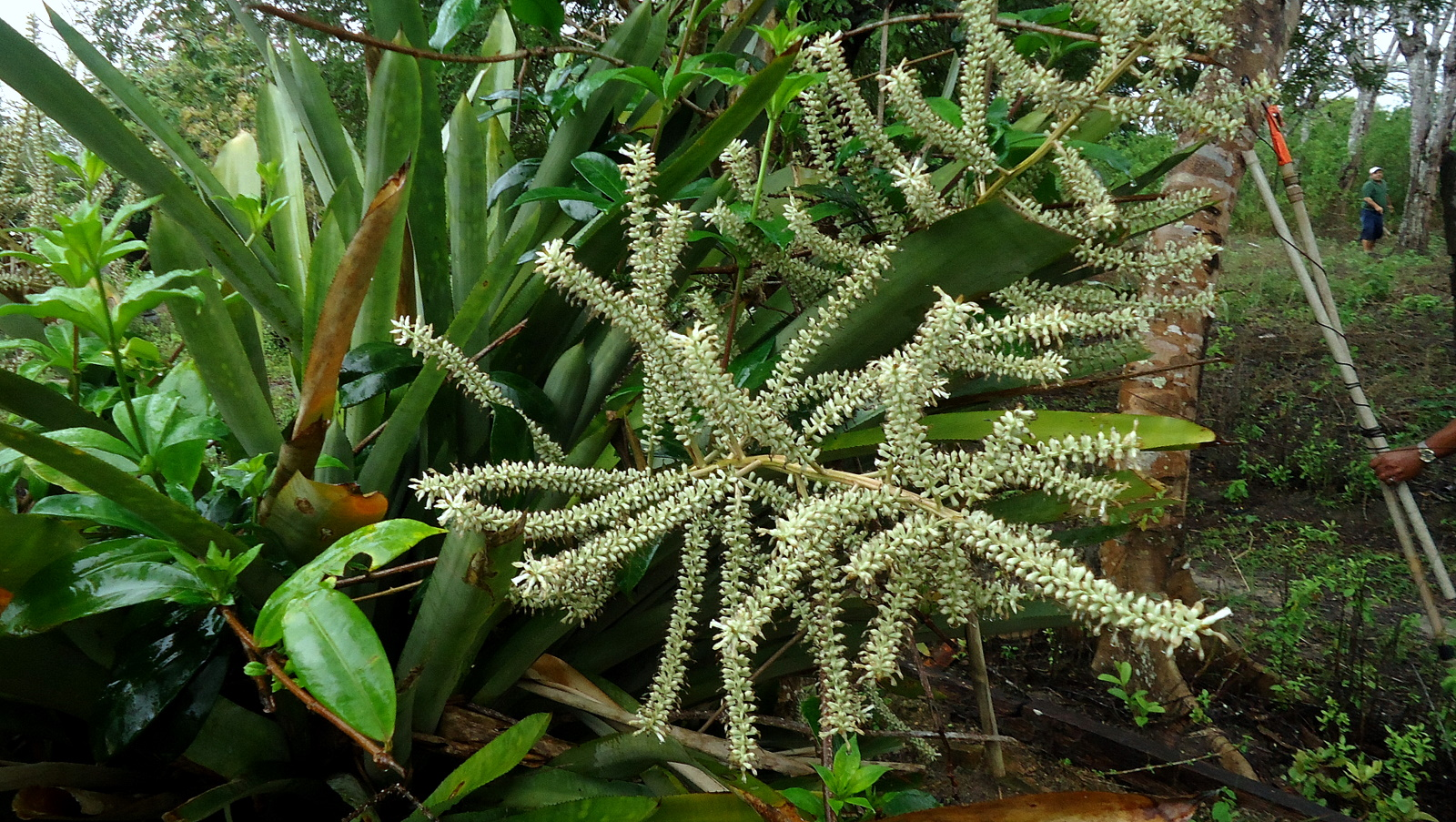
- Wittmackia patentissima

Scientific classification
- Kingdom: Plantae
- Clade: Tracheophytes
- Clade: Angiosperms
- Clade: Monocots
- Clade: Commelinids
- Order: Poales
- Family: Bromeliaceae
- Subfamily: Bromelioideae
- Genus: Wittmackia; Mez

= Wittmackia =

Genus of flowering plant

Wittmackia is a genus of flowering plants in the family Bromeliaceae.

The genus name of Wittmackia honour of Ludwig Wittmack (1839–1929), a German botanist. The genus was first described and published in C.F.P.von Martius & auct. suc. (eds.), Fl. Bras. Vol.3 (Issue 3) on page 274 in 1891.

Its native range extends from Mexico, through Central America to Tropical South America, including parts of the Caribbean. It is found in Bahamas, Brazil, Cayman Islands, Costa Rica, Cuba, French Guiana, Guyana, Jamaica, Leeward Islands, Panamá, Puerto Rico, Suriname, Trinidad and Tobago, Turks and Caicos Islands, Venezuela, Venezuelan Antilles and Windward Islands.

== Known species ==
As of July 2026, Kew's Plants of the World Online listed the following species:

- Wittmackia abbreviata (L.B.Sm. & Proctor) Aguirre-Santoro
- Wittmackia altocaririensis (Leme & L.Kollmann) Aguirre-Santoro
- Wittmackia amorimii (Leme) Aguirre-Santoro
- Wittmackia andersoniana (Leme & H.Luther) Aguirre-Santoro
- Wittmackia antillana (Mez) Aguirre-Santoro
- Wittmackia aurantiolilacina Leme, E.P.Fern. & Amorim
- Wittmackia bicolor (L.B.Sm.) Aguirre-Santoro
- Wittmackia brasiliensis (E.Pereira & I.A.Penna) Aguirre-Santoro
- Wittmackia burle-marxii (E.Pereira) Aguirre-Santoro
- Wittmackia canaliculata (Leme & H.Luther) Aguirre-Santoro
- Wittmackia carvalhoi (Martinelli & Leme) Aguirre-Santoro
- Wittmackia caymanensis (Britton ex L.B.Sm.) Aguirre-Santoro
- Wittmackia conduruensis Leme & E.H.Souza
- Wittmackia distans (Griseb.) Aguirre-Santoro
- Wittmackia eriostachya (Mez) Aguirre-Santoro
- Wittmackia fawcettii (Mez) Aguirre-Santoro
- Wittmackia froesii (L.B.Sm.) Aguirre-Santoro
- Wittmackia gregaria (Leme & L.Kollmann) Aguirre-Santoro
- Wittmackia guedesiae E.H.Souza & Leme
- Wittmackia incompta (Leme & H.Luther) Aguirre-Santoro
- Wittmackia inermis (Mez) Aguirre-Santoro
- Wittmackia ituberaensis (Leme & L.Kollmann) Aguirre-Santoro
- Wittmackia jamaicana (L.B.Sm. & Proctor) Aguirre-Santoro
- Wittmackia laesslei (L.B.Sm.) Aguirre-Santoro
- Wittmackia laevigata (Leme) Aguirre-Santoro
- Wittmackia limae (Leme) Aguirre-Santoro
- Wittmackia lingulata (L.) Mez
- Wittmackia lingulatoides (Leme & H.Luther) Aguirre-Santoro
- Wittmackia linharesiorum (Leme) Aguirre-Santoro
- Wittmackia maranguapensis (Leme & Scharf) Aguirre-Santoro
- Wittmackia mesoamericana (I.Ramírez, Carnevali & Cetzal) Aguirre-Santoro
- Wittmackia negrilensis (Britton ex L.B.Sm.) Aguirre-Santoro
- Wittmackia neoregelioides (Leme) Aguirre-Santoro
- Wittmackia patentissima (Mart. ex Schult. & Schult.f.) Mez
- Wittmackia penduliflora (A.Rich.) Aguirre-Santoro
- Wittmackia pendulispica (Leme & L.Kollmann) Aguirre-Santoro
- Wittmackia pernambucentris (J.A.Siqueira & Leme) Aguirre-Santoro
- Wittmackia polycephala (Baker) Aguirre-Santoro
- Wittmackia portoricensis (Mez) Aguirre-Santoro
- Wittmackia rohan-estyi (Proctor, Aguirre-Santoro & K.Campbell) Aguirre-Santoro
- Wittmackia silvana (Leme) Aguirre-Santoro
- Wittmackia spinulosa (Mez) Aguirre-Santoro
- Wittmackia sulbahianensis (Leme, Amorim & J.A.Siqueira) Aguirre-Santoro
- Wittmackia tentaculifera (Leme, Amorim & J.A.Siqueira) Aguirre-Santoro
- Wittmackia turbinocalyx (Mez) Aguirre-Santoro
- Wittmackia urbaniana (Mez) Aguirre-Santoro
- Wittmackia viridostigma (Leme & H.Luther) Aguirre-Santoro
