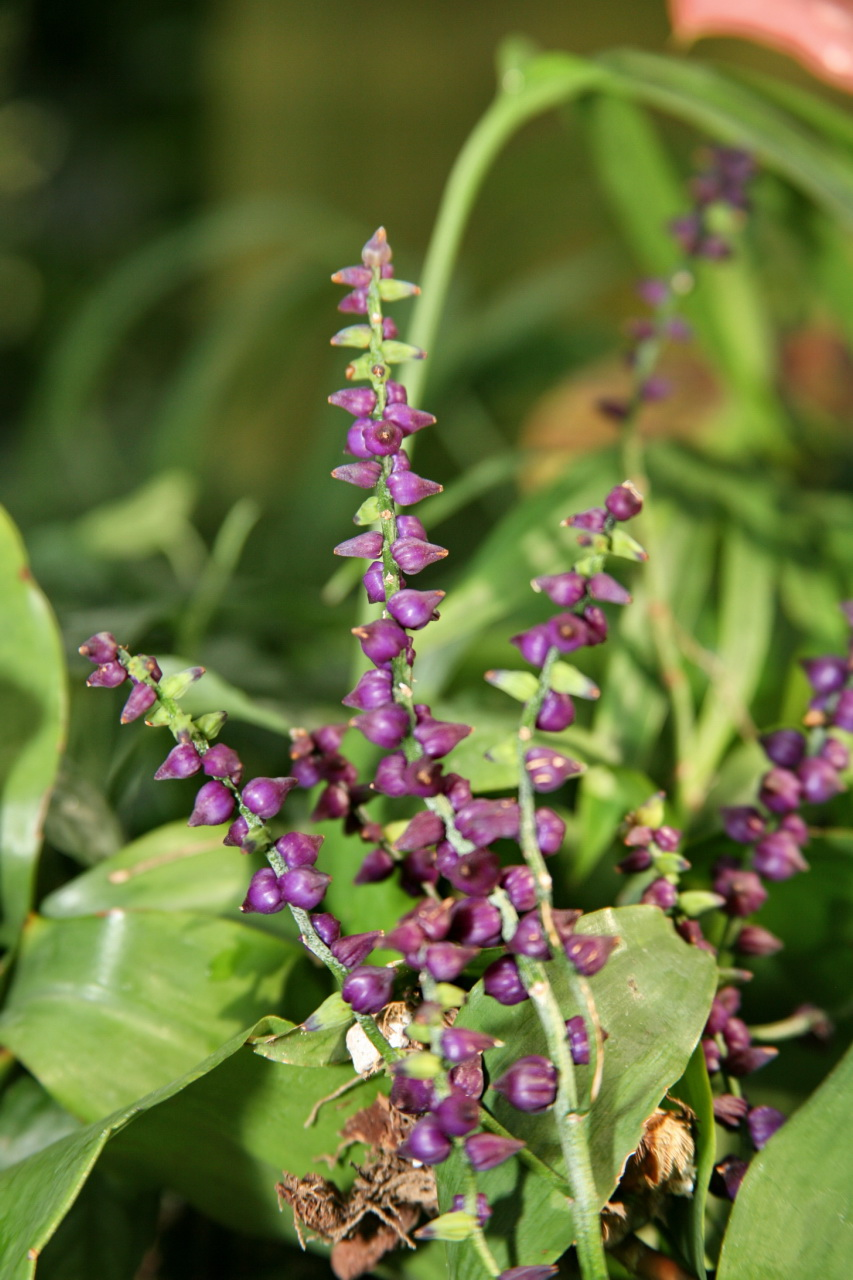
- Lymania smithii

Scientific classification
- Kingdom: Plantae
- Clade: Tracheophytes
- Clade: Angiosperms
- Clade: Monocots
- Clade: Commelinids
- Order: Poales
- Family: Bromeliaceae
- Subfamily: Bromelioideae
- Genus: Lymania; Read

= Lymania =

Genus of flowering plants

Lymania (named for Lyman Bradford Smith, American botanist) is a genus in the plant family Bromeliaceae, subfamily Bromelioideae. The genus was established in 1984 to "unite furrowed or winged species from Aechmea subgenera Lamprococcus, Araeococcus and Ronnbergia."

Lymania is a group of plants endemic to the Bahian coast of the Brazilian rainforest. Modern DNA analysis has confirmed that Lymania is correctly classified as an independent genus containing two distinct clades.

== Species ==
As of November 2022, Plants of the World Online accepted the following species:

- Lymania alvimii (L.B.Sm. & Read) Read
- Lymania azurea Leme
- Lymania brachycaulis (Baker) L.F.Sousa
- Lymania corallina (Beer) Read
- Lymania globosa Leme
- Lymania involucrata Leme & E.H.Souza
- Lymania languida Leme
- Lymania marantoides (L.B.Sm.) Read
- Lymania smithii Read
- Lymania spiculata Leme & Forzza
