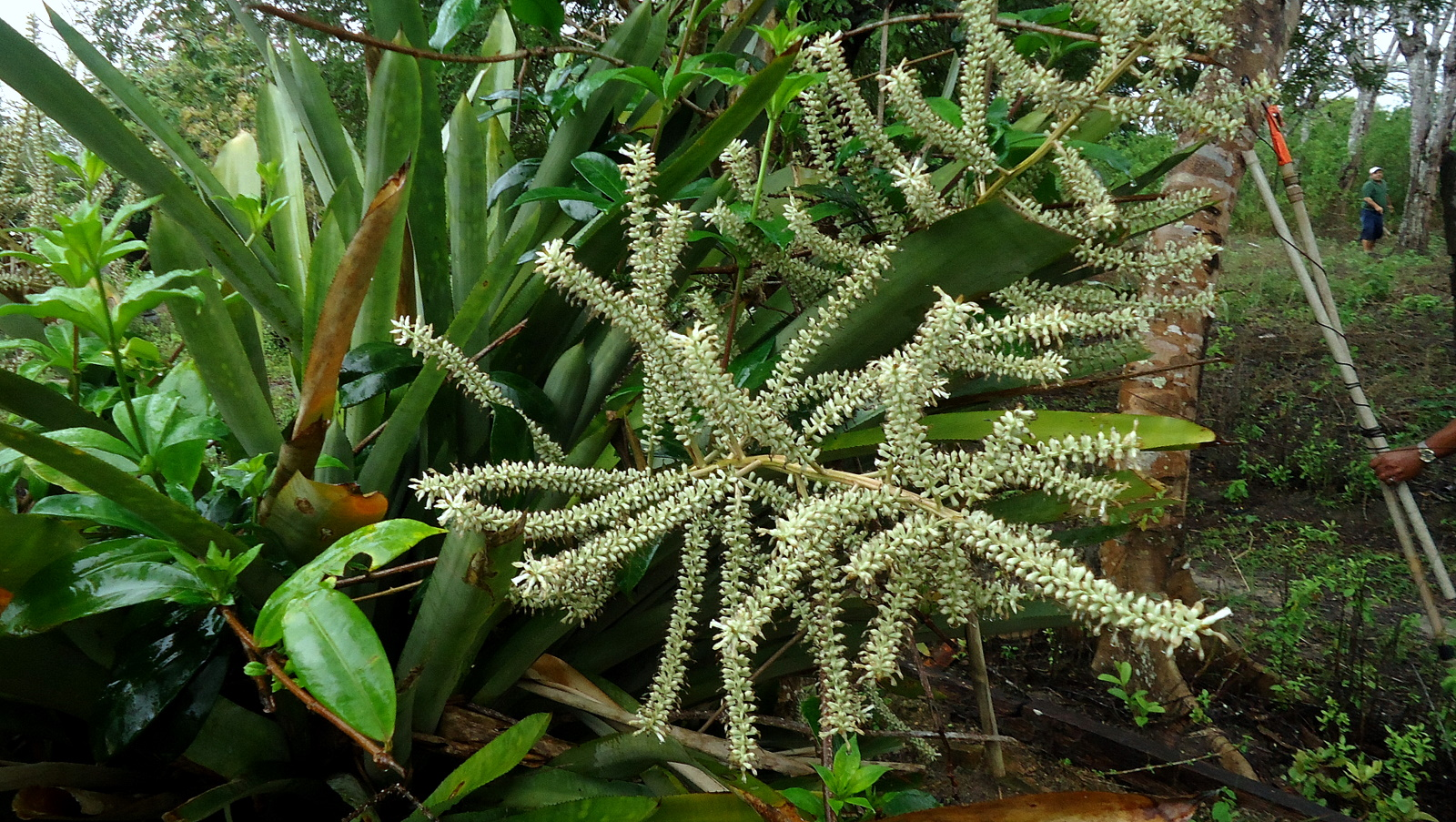

Scientific classification
- Kingdom: Plantae
- Clade: Tracheophytes
- Clade: Angiosperms
- Clade: Monocots
- Clade: Commelinids
- Order: Poales
- Family: Bromeliaceae
- Genus: Wittmackia
- Species: W. patentissima

Binomial name
- Wittmackia patentissima (Mart. ex Schult. & Schult.f.) Mez

Synonyms
- Aechmea patentissima (Martius ex Schultes & Schultes f.) Baker

= Wittmackia patentissima =

Species of flowering plant

Wittmackia patentissima is a species of plant in the family Bromeliaceae. This species is endemic to Brazil.
