= Ronnbergia tonduzii =

Scientific classification
- Kingdom: Plantae
- Clade: Tracheophytes
- Clade: Angiosperms
- Clade: Monocots
- Clade: Commelinids
- Order: Poales
- Family: Bromeliaceae
- Subfamily: Bromelioideae
- Genus: Ronnbergia
- Species: R. tonduzii

Binomial name
- Ronnbergia tonduzii (Mez & Pittier) Aguirre-Santoro

Synonyms
- Homotypic Synonyms: Aechmea tonduzii Mez & Pittier; Pothuava tonduzii (Mez & Pittier) L.B.Sm. & W.J.Kress

Species of flowering plant

Ronnbergia tonduzii is a species of flowering plant in the family Bromeliaceae. It is native to Colombia, Costa Rica, Ecuador and Panama. It was first described in 1903 as Aechmea tonduzii.
