= Wittmackia pernambucentris =

Scientific classification
- Kingdom: Plantae
- Clade: Tracheophytes
- Clade: Angiosperms
- Clade: Monocots
- Clade: Commelinids
- Order: Poales
- Family: Bromeliaceae
- Genus: Wittmackia
- Species: W. pernambucentris

Binomial name
- Wittmackia pernambucentris (J.A.Siqueira & Leme) Aguirre-Santoro

Synonyms
- Aechmea pernambucentris J.A. Siqueira & Leme

Species of flowering plant

Wittmackia pernambucentris is a species of plant in the family Bromeliaceae. This species is endemic to the State of Pernambuco in eastern Brazil.
