= Wittmackia incompta =

Scientific classification
- Kingdom: Plantae
- Clade: Embryophytes
- Clade: Tracheophytes
- Clade: Spermatophytes
- Clade: Angiosperms
- Clade: Monocots
- Clade: Commelinids
- Order: Poales
- Family: Bromeliaceae
- Genus: Wittmackia
- Species: W. incompta

Binomial name
- Wittmackia incompta (Leme & H.Luther) Aguirre-Santoro

Synonyms
- Aechmea incompta Leme & H.Luther

Species of flowering plant

Wittmackia incompta is a species of plant in the family Bromeliaceae. This species is endemic to the State of Bahia in eastern Brazil.

== Cultivars ==
- Aechmea 'Tingua'
