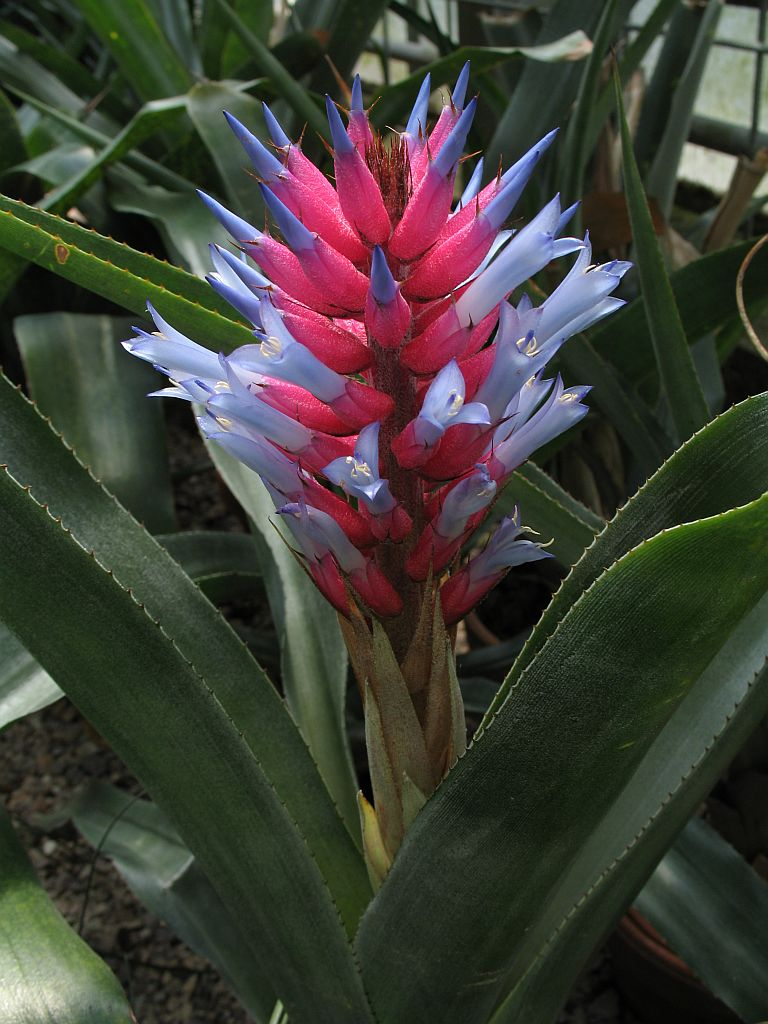
- In cultivation at the Botanical Garden of the University of Heidelberg, Germany

Conservation status
- Vulnerable (IUCN 3.1)

Scientific classification
- Kingdom: Plantae
- Clade: Tracheophytes
- Clade: Angiosperms
- Clade: Monocots
- Clade: Commelinids
- Order: Poales
- Family: Bromeliaceae
- Subfamily: Bromelioideae
- Genus: Ronnbergia
- Species: R. wuelfinghoffii

Binomial name
- Ronnbergia wuelfinghoffii (E.Gross) Aguirre-Santoro

Synonyms
- Aechmea wuelfinghoffii E.Gross

= Ronnbergia wuelfinghoffii =

Species of flowering plant

Ronnbergia wuelfinghoffii is a species of flowering plant in the family Bromeliaceae, native to western Colombia and Ecuador. It was first described in 1998 as Aechmea wuelfinghoffii. Its natural habitat is subtropical or tropical moist lowland forests. It is threatened by habitat loss.
