= Wittmackia sulbahianensis =

Scientific classification
- Kingdom: Plantae
- Clade: Tracheophytes
- Clade: Angiosperms
- Clade: Monocots
- Clade: Commelinids
- Order: Poales
- Family: Bromeliaceae
- Genus: Wittmackia
- Species: W. sulbahianensis

Binomial name
- Wittmackia sulbahianensis (Leme, Amorim & J.A.Siqueira) Aguirre-Santoro

Synonyms
- Aechmea sulbahianensis Leme, Amorim & J.A. Siqueira

Species of flowering plant

Wittmackia sulbahianensis is a species of plant in the family Bromeliaceae. This species is endemic to eastern Brazil, known from the States of Bahia and Espírito Santo.
