= Ronnbergia involucrata =

Scientific classification
- Kingdom: Plantae
- Clade: Tracheophytes
- Clade: Angiosperms
- Clade: Monocots
- Clade: Commelinids
- Order: Poales
- Family: Bromeliaceae
- Subfamily: Bromelioideae
- Genus: Ronnbergia
- Species: R. involucrata

Binomial name
- Ronnbergia involucrata (André) Aguirre-Santoro

Synonyms
- Aechmea involucrata André; Pothuava involucrata (André) L.B.Sm. & W.J.Kress

Species of flowering plant

Ronnbergia involucrata is a species of flowering plant in the family Bromeliaceae, endemic to Ecuador. It was first described in 1888 as Aechmea involucrata.
