= Wittmackia burle-marxii =

Scientific classification
- Kingdom: Plantae
- Clade: Tracheophytes
- Clade: Angiosperms
- Clade: Monocots
- Clade: Commelinids
- Order: Poales
- Family: Bromeliaceae
- Subfamily: Bromelioideae
- Genus: Wittmackia
- Species: W. burle-marxii

Binomial name
- Wittmackia burle-marxii (E.Pereira) Aguirre-Santoro

Synonyms
- Aechmea burle-marxii E.Pereira; Ortgiesia burle-marxii (E.Pereira) L.B.Sm. & W.J.Kress

Species of flowering plant

Wittmackia burle-marxii is a species of flowering plant in the family Bromeliaceae, endemic to Brazil (the states of Bahia and Minas Gerais). It was first described in 1979 as Aechmea burle-marxii.
