= Lymania azurea =

Scientific classification
- Kingdom: Plantae
- Clade: Tracheophytes
- Clade: Angiosperms
- Clade: Monocots
- Clade: Commelinids
- Order: Poales
- Family: Bromeliaceae
- Genus: Lymania
- Species: L. azurea

Binomial name
- Lymania azurea Leme

Species of flowering plant

Lymania azurea is a plant species in the genus Lymania. This species is endemic to Brazil.
