= Wittmackia froesii =

Scientific classification
- Kingdom: Plantae
- Clade: Tracheophytes
- Clade: Angiosperms
- Clade: Monocots
- Clade: Commelinids
- Order: Poales
- Family: Bromeliaceae
- Genus: Wittmackia
- Species: W. froesii

Binomial name
- Wittmackia froesii (L.B.Sm.) Aguirre-Santoro

Synonyms
- Aechmea froesii (L.B. Smith) Leme & J.A. Siqueira; Aechmea lingulata var. froesii L.B.Sm.

Species of flowering plant

Wittmackia froesii is a species of plant in the family Bromeliaceae. This species is endemic to the State of Bahia in eastern Brazil.
