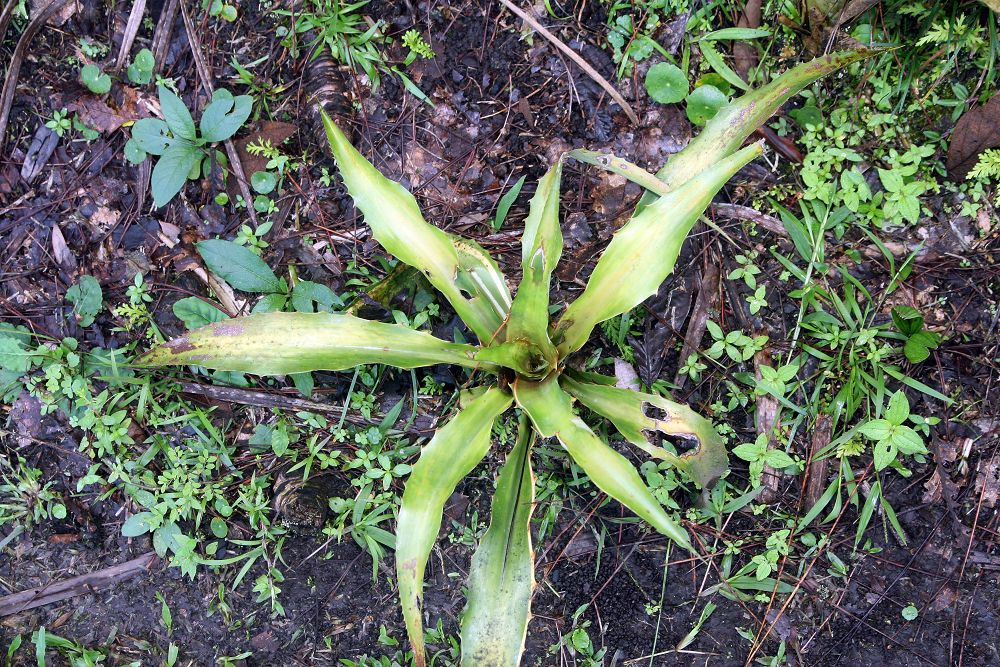

Scientific classification
- Kingdom: Plantae
- Clade: Embryophytes
- Clade: Tracheophytes
- Clade: Spermatophytes
- Clade: Angiosperms
- Clade: Monocots
- Clade: Commelinids
- Order: Poales
- Family: Bromeliaceae
- Subfamily: Bromelioideae
- Genus: Ronnbergia
- Species: R. veitchii

Binomial name
- Ronnbergia veitchii (Baker) Aguirre-Santoro

Synonyms
- Aechmea veitchii Baker; Chevaliera veitchii (Baker) É.Morren

= Ronnbergia veitchii =

Species of flowering plant

Ronnbergia veitchii is a species of flowering plant in the family Bromeliaceae, native to Costa Rica, Panama, Colombia, Peru and Ecuador. It was first described in 1877 as Aechmea veitchii.
