= Ronnbergia hathewayi =

Scientific classification
- Kingdom: Plantae
- Clade: Tracheophytes
- Clade: Angiosperms
- Clade: Monocots
- Clade: Commelinids
- Order: Poales
- Family: Bromeliaceae
- Genus: Ronnbergia
- Species: R. hathewayi

Binomial name
- Ronnbergia hathewayi L.B.Sm.

Species of flowering plant

Ronnbergia hathewayi is a plant species in the genus Ronnbergia. This species is native to Costa Rica.
