= Wittmackia turbinocalyx =

Scientific classification
- Kingdom: Plantae
- Clade: Embryophytes
- Clade: Tracheophytes
- Clade: Spermatophytes
- Clade: Angiosperms
- Clade: Monocots
- Clade: Commelinids
- Order: Poales
- Family: Bromeliaceae
- Subfamily: Bromelioideae
- Genus: Wittmackia
- Species: W. turbinocalyx

Binomial name
- Wittmackia turbinocalyx (Mez) Aguirre-Santoro

Synonyms
- Homotypic Synonyms: Aechmea turbinocalyx Mez; Macrochordion turbinocalyx (Mez) L.B.Sm. & W.J.Kress; Heterotypic Synonyms: Aechmea curranii (L.B.Sm.) L.B.Sm. & M.A.Spencer; Streptocalyx curranii L.B.Sm.

Species of flowering plant

Wittmackia turbinocalyx is a species of flowering plant in the family Bromeliaceae, endemic to Brazil (the states of Bahia and Minas Gerais). It was first described in 1892 by Carl Christian Mez as Aechmea turbinocalyx.
