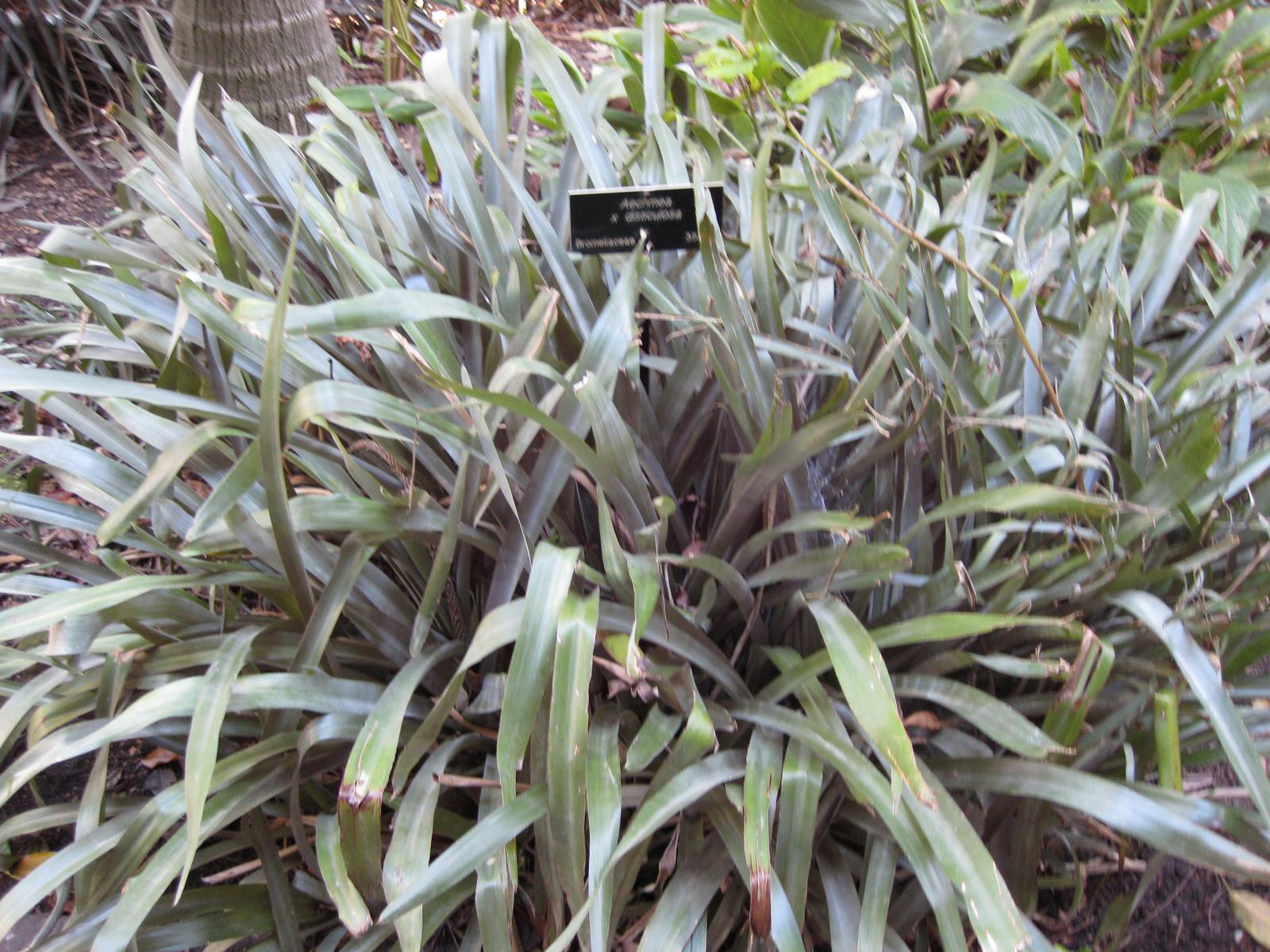
- Photographed at Huntington Gardens

Scientific classification
- Kingdom: Plantae
- Clade: Embryophytes
- Clade: Tracheophytes
- Clade: Spermatophytes
- Clade: Angiosperms
- Clade: Monocots
- Clade: Commelinids
- Order: Poales
- Family: Bromeliaceae
- Subfamily: Bromelioideae
- Genus: Ronnbergia
- Species: R. aciculosa

Binomial name
- Ronnbergia aciculosa (Mez & Sodiro) Aguirre-Santoro

Synonyms
- Homotypic Synonyms: Aechmea aciculosa Mez & Sodiro; Pothuava aciculosa (Mez & Sodiro) L.B.Sm. & W.J.Kress; Heterotypic Synonyms: Nidularium deleonii L.B.Sm.; Ronnbergia nidularioides H.Luther

= Ronnbergia aciculosa =

Species of flowering plant

Ronnbergia aciculosa is a species of flowering plant in the family Bromeliaceae. It is native to Colombia and Ecuador. It was first described in 1904 as Aechmea aciculosa.
