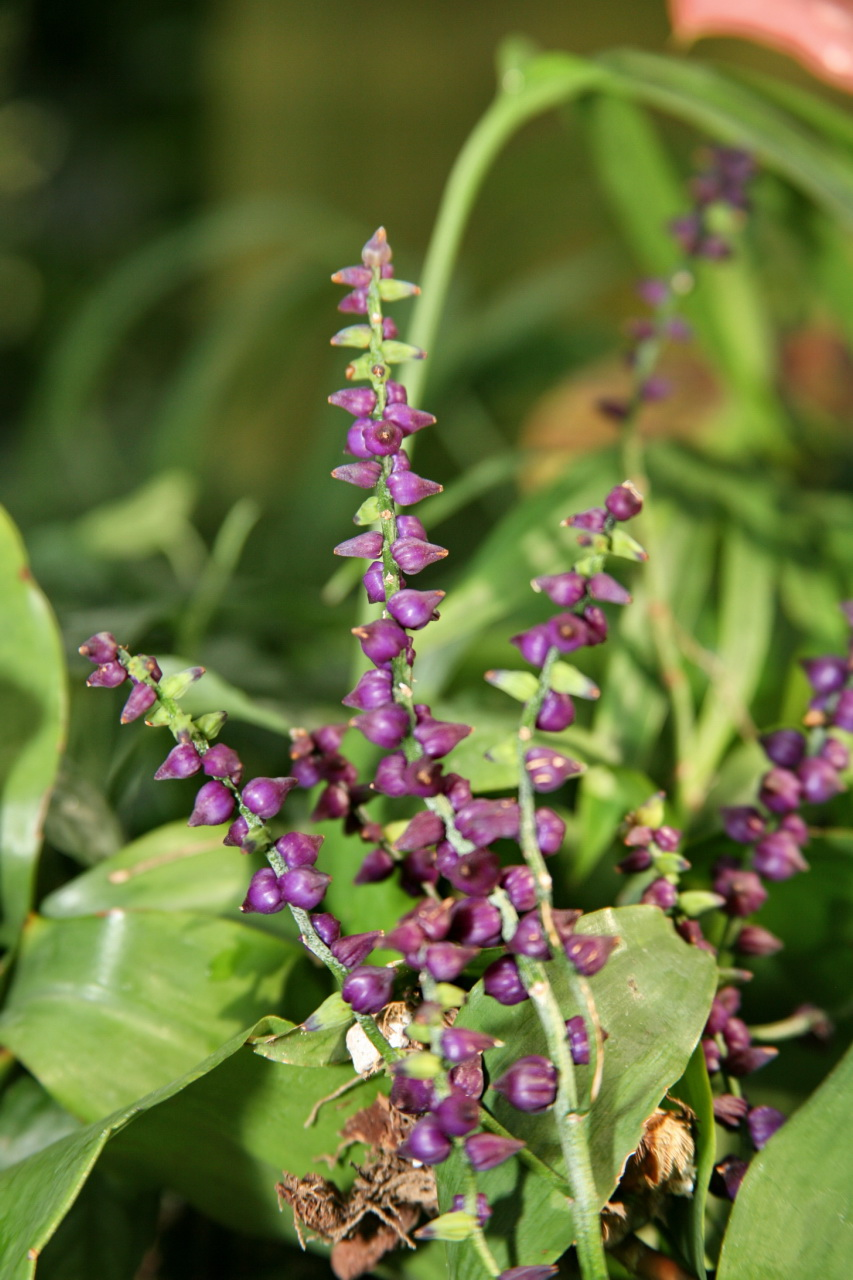

Scientific classification
- Kingdom: Plantae
- Clade: Tracheophytes
- Clade: Angiosperms
- Clade: Monocots
- Clade: Commelinids
- Order: Poales
- Family: Bromeliaceae
- Genus: Lymania
- Species: L. smithii

Binomial name
- Lymania smithii R.W.Read

= Lymania smithii =

Species of flowering plant

Lymania smithii is a plant species in the genus Lymania. This species is endemic to the State of Bahia in eastern Brazil.
