= Wittmackia bicolor =

Scientific classification
- Kingdom: Plantae
- Clade: Tracheophytes
- Clade: Angiosperms
- Clade: Monocots
- Clade: Commelinids
- Order: Poales
- Family: Bromeliaceae
- Subfamily: Bromelioideae
- Genus: Wittmackia
- Species: W. bicolor

Binomial name
- Wittmackia bicolor (L.B.Sm.) Aguirre-Santoro

Synonyms
- Aechmea bicolor L.B.Sm.; Ortgiesia bicolor (L.B.Sm.) L.B.Sm. & W.J.Kress

Species of flowering plant

Wittmackia bicolor is a species of flowering plant in the family Bromeliaceae, endemic to south Brazil (the state of Santa Catarina). It was first described by Lyman Bradford Smith in 1955 as Aechmea bicolor.
