= Wittmackia tentaculifera =

Scientific classification
- Kingdom: Plantae
- Clade: Tracheophytes
- Clade: Angiosperms
- Clade: Monocots
- Clade: Commelinids
- Order: Poales
- Family: Bromeliaceae
- Genus: Wittmackia
- Species: W. tentaculifera

Binomial name
- Wittmackia tentaculifera (Leme, Amorim & J.A.Siqueira) Aguirre-Santoro

Synonyms
- Aechmea tentaculifera Leme, Amorim & J.A. Siqueira

Species of flowering plant

Wittmackia tentaculifera is a species of plant in the family Bromeliaceae. This species is endemic to the State of Bahia in eastern Brazil.
