= Lymania marantoides =

Scientific classification
- Kingdom: Plantae
- Clade: Tracheophytes
- Clade: Angiosperms
- Clade: Monocots
- Clade: Commelinids
- Order: Poales
- Family: Bromeliaceae
- Genus: Lymania
- Species: L. marantoides

Binomial name
- Lymania marantoides (L.B.Sm.) R.W.Read

Synonyms
- Ronnbergia marantoides L.B.Sm.

Species of flowering plant

Lymania marantoides is a plant species in the genus Lymania. This species is endemic to the State of Bahia in eastern Brazil.
