= Wittmackia neoregelioides =

Scientific classification
- Kingdom: Plantae
- Clade: Tracheophytes
- Clade: Angiosperms
- Clade: Monocots
- Clade: Commelinids
- Order: Poales
- Family: Bromeliaceae
- Subfamily: Bromelioideae
- Genus: Wittmackia
- Species: W. neoregelioides

Binomial name
- Wittmackia neoregelioides (Leme) Aguirre-Santoro

Synonyms
- Ronnbergia neoregelioides Leme

Species of flowering plant

Wittmackia neoregelioides is a species of flowering plant in the family Bromeliaceae, endemic to Brazil (the state of Bahia). It was first described in 1999 as Ronnbergia neoregelioides.
