= Wittmackia brasiliensis =

Scientific classification
- Kingdom: Plantae
- Clade: Tracheophytes
- Clade: Angiosperms
- Clade: Monocots
- Clade: Commelinids
- Order: Poales
- Family: Bromeliaceae
- Subfamily: Bromelioideae
- Genus: Wittmackia
- Species: W. brasiliensis

Binomial name
- Wittmackia brasiliensis (E.Pereira & I.A.Penna) Aguirre-Santoro

Synonyms
- Ronnbergia brasiliensis E.Pereira & I.A.Penna; Aechmea subintegerrima (Philcox) Leme; Streptocalyx laxiflorus Philcox, nom. illeg.; Streptocalyx subintegerrimus Philcox

Species of plant

Wittmackia brasiliensis is a species of flowering plant in the family Bromeliaceae, endemic to Brazil (the state of Bahia). It was first described in 1985 as Ronnbergia brasiliensis.
