= Lastarriaea coriacea =

Scientific classification
- Kingdom: Plantae
- Clade: Tracheophytes
- Clade: Angiosperms
- Clade: Eudicots
- Order: Caryophyllales
- Family: Polygonaceae
- Genus: Lastarriaea
- Species: L. coriacea

Binomial name
- Lastarriaea coriacea (Goodman) Hoover

Synonyms
- Chorizanthe coriacea Chorizanthe lastarriaea

Species of flowering plant

Lastarriaea coriacea is a species of flowering plant in the buckwheat family known by the common name leather spineflower. It is native to California and adjacent northern Mexico where it is a common plant of many habitat types. This is an annual herb forming a patch of stems growing flat on the ground or rising slightly to a maximum height near 15 centimeters. The small leaves are located basally, where the stems emerge from the ground. They are generally hairy and linear in shape, and not more than 3 centimeters long. The stems branch into wide inflorescences bearing pointed bracts and flowers with spiky awns.
