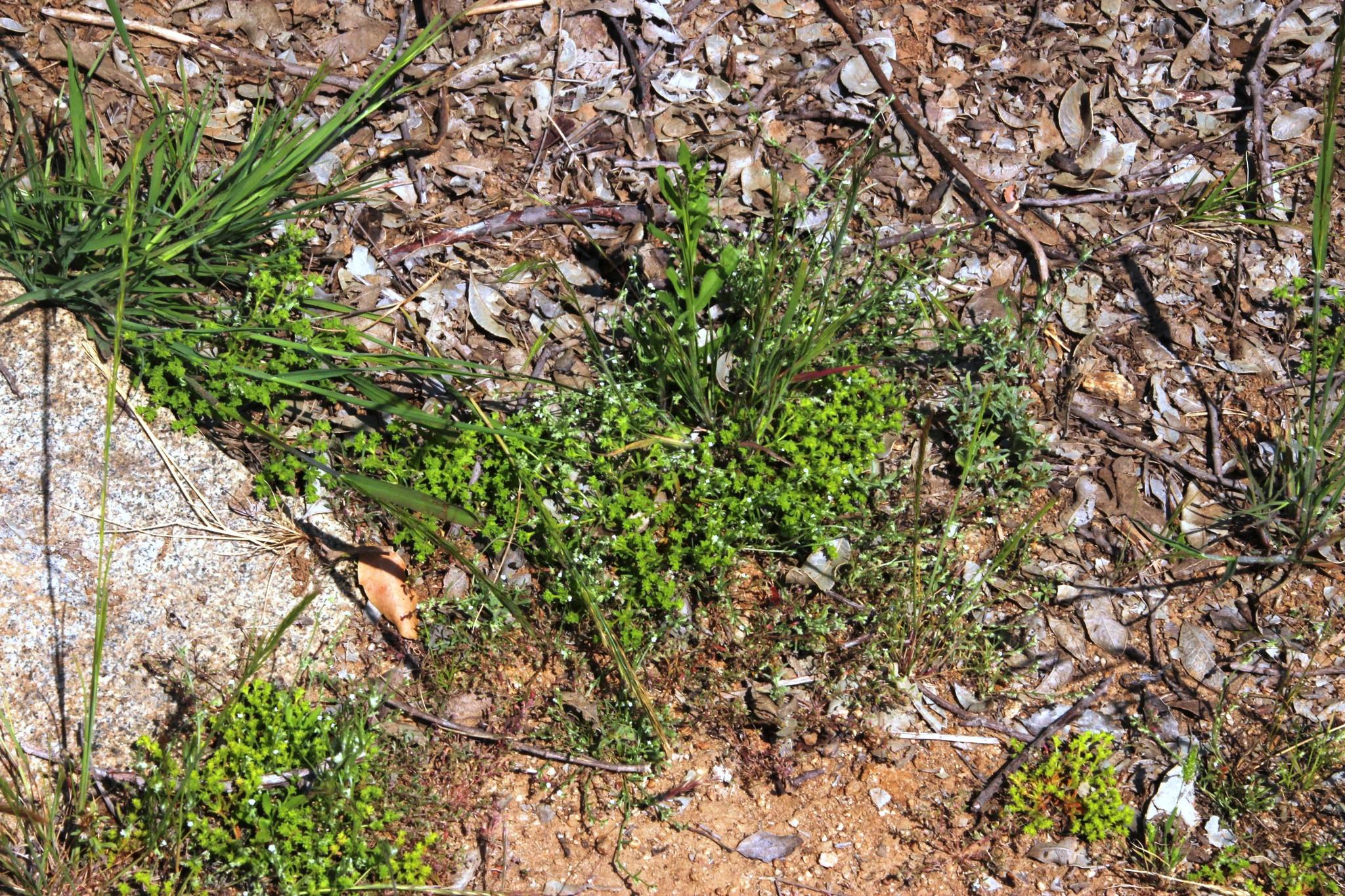
- Lastarriaea chilensis

Scientific classification
- Kingdom: Plantae
- Clade: Tracheophytes
- Clade: Angiosperms
- Clade: Eudicots
- Order: Caryophyllales
- Family: Polygonaceae
- Subfamily: Eriogonoideae
- Genus: Lastarriaea; Rémy

Species
- 3; see text

Synonyms
- Donatia Bertero ex Remy

= Lastarriaea =

Genus of flowering plants

Lastarriaea is a genus of flowering plants in the family Polygonaceae. It includes three species, one (L. coriacea) native to western North America, and the other two native in southern South America.

- Lastarriaea chilensis J.Rémy
- Lastarriaea coriacea (Goodman) Hoover - leather spineflower
- Lastarriaea ptilota Reveal
