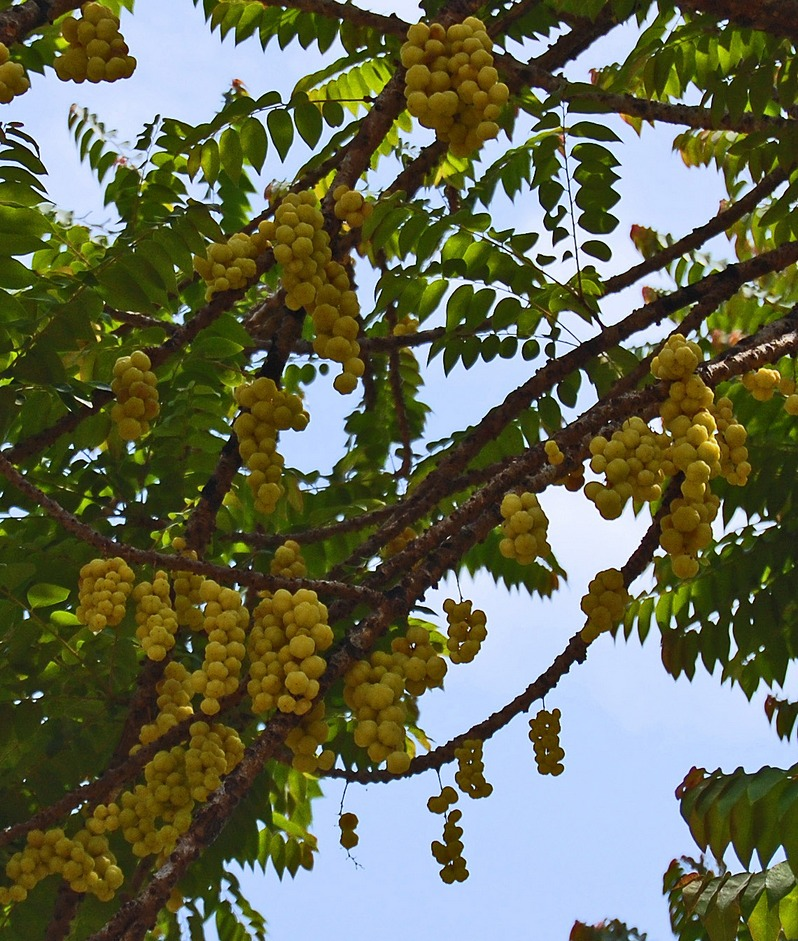
- Phyllanthus acidus fruits

Scientific classification
- Kingdom: Plantae
- Clade: Tracheophytes
- Clade: Angiosperms
- Clade: Eudicots
- Clade: Rosids
- Order: Malpighiales
- Family: Phyllanthaceae
- Subfamily: Phyllanthoideae
- Tribe: Phyllantheae; Dumort.

Genera
- Subtribe Andrachinae: Andrachne (also Eraeliss, Thelypotzium) Subtribe Astrocasiinae: Astrocasia Subtribe Flueggeinae: Breynia (also Foersteria, Forsteria, Melanthes, Melanthesa, Melanthesopsis) Flueggea (also Acidoton, Bessera, Colmeiroa, Geblera, Neowawraea, Pleiostemon, Villanova) Glochidion (also Agyneia, Bradleia, Bradleja, Coccoglochidion, Diasperus, Episteira, Glochidionopsis, Glochisandra, Gynoon, Lobocarpus, Pseudoglochidion, Tetraglochidion, Zarcoa) Margaritaria (also Calococcus, Prosorus, Wurtzia, Zygospermum) Phyllanthus (also Anisonema, Aporosella, Arachnodes, Ardinghalia, Asterandra, Cathetus, Ceramanthus, Chorisandra, Cicca, Clambus, Conami, Dendrophyllanthus, Dicholactina, Dimorphocladium, Emblica, Epistylium, Eriococcus, Fluggeopsis, Genesiphylla, Hemicicca, Hemiglochidion, Kirganelia, Leichhardtia, Lomanthes, Maborea, Macraea, Menarda, Mirobalanus, Moeroris, Nellica, Niruri, Nymania, Nymphanthus, Orbicularia, Oxalistylis, Ramsdenia, Reidia, Reverchonia, Rhopium, Roigia, Scepasma, Staurothylax, Synexemia, Tricarium, Uranthera, Urinaria, Williamia, Xylophylla) Richeriella Sauropus (also Aalius, Breyniopsis, Ceratogynum, Diplomorpha, Heterocalymnantha, Hexadena, Hexaspermum, Ibina, Synastemon, Synostemon) Subtribe Leptopinae: Leptopus (also Andrachne, Chorisandrachne, Hexakestra, Hexakistra) Subtribe Pseudolachnostylidinae: Chascotheca (also Chaenotheca) Keayodendron Meineckia (also Cluytiandra, Neopeltandra, Peltandra) Pseudolachnostylis Zimmermannia Zimmermanniopsis Subtribe Securineginae: Securinega

= Phyllantheae =

Tribe of flowering plants

Phyllantheae is a tribe of the family Phyllanthaceae. The taxonomy of the group is not yet clear, and work continues (see Phyllanthus for more details). A recent revision based on nuclear and chloroplast DNA sequences divides the tribe into 6 subtribes and 18 genera.
