= Bois bande =

Bois bande or bois bandé is the common name of several West Indian tree species reputed to have aphrodisiac properties including:

- Parinari campestris
- Richeria grandis
- Roupala montana

Bois Bandé (French spelling or bwa bandé, Creole spelling) is the bark of the tree Richeria grandis. It has had a long reputation in the Caribbean as an aphrodisiac. The name "Bois Bande" means "Erect wood" from the French, bois (wood) + bander (to have an erection). The tree is found in Grenada, Trinidad, Dominica, Costa Rica, St. Lucia, other Caribbean Islands, and Brazil.
