= Thecacoris =

Scientific classification
- Kingdom: Plantae
- Clade: Tracheophytes
- Clade: Angiosperms
- Clade: Eudicots
- Clade: Rosids
- Order: Malpighiales
- Family: Phyllanthaceae
- Subfamily: Antidesmatoideae
- Tribe: Antidesmateae
- Subtribe: Antidesmatinae
- Genus: Thecacoris; A.Juss.

Synonyms
- Baccaureopsis Pax; Cyathogyne Müll.Arg.; Henribaillonia Kuntze

Genus of flowering plants

Thecacoris is a genus of flowering plant belonging to the family Phyllanthaceae first described as a genus in 1821. It is native to tropical Africa and Madagascar. It is dioecious, with male and female flowers on separate plants, although it may rarely be monoecious.

Species

1. Thecacoris cometia - Madagascar
2. Thecacoris glabroglandulosa - Gabon, Zaïre
3. Thecacoris grandifolia - Gabon, Cameroon
4. Thecacoris humbertii - Madagascar
5. Thecacoris lancifolia - Gabon
6. Thecacoris latistipula - Zaïre
7. Thecacoris leptobotrya - C Africa
8. Thecacoris lucida - C Africa
9. Thecacoris madagascariensis - Madagascar
10. Thecacoris manniana - Sao Tomé
11. Thecacoris micrantha - Ivory Coast, Ghana
12. Thecacoris perrieri - Madagascar
13. Thecacoris spathulifolia - Somalia, Kenya, Tanzania, Mozambique, Madagascar
14. Thecacoris stenopetala - C + W Africa
15. Thecacoris trichogyne - C Africa
16. Thecacoris usambarensis - Kenya, Tanzania
17. Thecacoris viridis - C Africa

formerly included

moved to other genera: Maesobotrya Spondianthus

1. Thecacoris glabrata - Maesobotrya glabrata
2. Thecacoris trillesii - Spondianthus preussii subsp. glaber
