= Chorisandrachne =

Scientific classification
- Kingdom: Plantae
- Clade: Tracheophytes
- Clade: Angiosperms
- Clade: Eudicots
- Clade: Rosids
- Order: Malpighiales
- Family: Phyllanthaceae
- Subfamily: Phyllanthoideae
- Tribe: Wielandieae
- Subtribe: Wielandiinae
- Genus: Chorisandrachne; Airy Shaw
- Species: C. diplosperma

Binomial name
- Chorisandrachne diplosperma Airy Shaw

Synonyms
- Leptopus diplospermus (Airy Shaw) G.L.Webster

Genus of flowering plants

Chorisandrachne is a genus of plants in the family Phyllanthaceae first described as a genus in 1969. It contains only one known species, Chorisandrachne diplosperma, native to southern Thailand.
