= Plagiocladus =

Scientific classification
- Kingdom: Plantae
- Clade: Tracheophytes
- Clade: Angiosperms
- Clade: Eudicots
- Clade: Rosids
- Order: Malpighiales
- Family: Phyllanthaceae
- Subfamily: Phyllanthoideae
- Tribe: Phyllantheae
- Genus: Plagiocladus; Jean F.Brunel
- Species: P. diandrus

Binomial name
- Plagiocladus diandrus Miquel

Synonyms
- Phyllanthus diandrus Pax; Lingelsheimia longipedicellata J.Léonard

Genus of flowering plants

Plagiocladus is a genus of the family Phyllanthaceae, first described as a genus in 1987.

== Distribution ==
It contains only one known species, Plagiocladus diandrus, native to central Africa (Cameroon, Gabon, Equatorial Guinea, Republic of Congo).
