= Martretia =

Scientific classification
- Kingdom: Plantae
- Clade: Tracheophytes
- Clade: Angiosperms
- Clade: Eudicots
- Clade: Rosids
- Order: Malpighiales
- Family: Phyllanthaceae
- Subfamily: Antidesmatoideae
- Tribe: Antidesmateae
- Subtribe: Martretiinae
- Genus: Martretia; Beille
- Species: M. quadricornis

Binomial name
- Martretia quadricornis Beille

Genus of flowering plants

Martretia is a genus of plants in the family Phyllanthaceae first described as a genus in 1907. It contains only one known species, Martretia quadricornis, native to western and central Africa from Sierra Leone to Zaire. It is dioecious, with male and female flowers on separate plants.
