= Tacarcuna gentryi =

Scientific classification
- Kingdom: Plantae
- Clade: Tracheophytes
- Clade: Angiosperms
- Clade: Eudicots
- Clade: Rosids
- Order: Malpighiales
- Family: Phyllanthaceae
- Genus: Tacarcuna
- Species: T. gentryi

Binomial name
- Tacarcuna gentryi Huft

Species of flowering plant

Tacarcuna gentryi is a species of plants in the family Phyllanthaceae first described as a species in 1989.

The species has been collected in Darién Province in Panama and also in Magdalena Department in Colombia
