= Savia (plant) =

Scientific classification
- Kingdom: Plantae
- Clade: Tracheophytes
- Clade: Angiosperms
- Clade: Eudicots
- Clade: Rosids
- Order: Malpighiales
- Family: Phyllanthaceae
- Subfamily: Phyllanthoideae
- Tribe: Bridelieae
- Subtribe: Saviinae
- Genus: Savia; Willd. 1806 not Raf. 1808 (syn of Amphicarpaea in Fabaceae)

Synonyms
- Kleinodendron L.B.Sm. & Downs

Genus of plants

Savia is a genus of the family Phyllanthaceae first described as a genus in 1806. It is native to the West Indies, the Florida Keys, Mexico, Venezuela, Brazil, and Paraguay.

species

1. Savia dictyocarpa Müll.Arg. - Paraguay, S Brazil
2. Savia sessiliflora (Sw.) Willd. - Mexico (Nayarit + Tamaulipas to Quintana Roo), West Indies (Greater Antilles, Leeward Is), Venezuela

formerly included

moved to other genera: Actephila Gonatogyne Heterosavia Phyllanthopsis Pseudophyllanthus Wielandia

1. S. actephila - Actephila excelsa var. javanica
2. S. andringitrana - Wielandia platyrachis
3. S. apiculata - Heterosavia bahamensis
4. S. arida - Phyllanthopsis arida
5. S. bahamensis - Heterosavia bahamensis
6. S. bemarensis - Wielandia bemarensis
7. S. bojeriana - Wielandia bojeriana
8. S. brasiliensis - Gonatogyne brasiliensis
9. S. clementis - Heterosavia maculata var. clementis
10. S. clusiifolia - Heterosavia bahamensis
11. S. cuneifolia - Heterosavia maculata
12. S. danguyana - Wielandia danguyana
13. S. decaryi - Wielandia oblongifolia
14. S. elegans - Wielandia elegans
15. S. erythroxyloides - Heterosavia erythroxyloides
16. S. fadenii - Wielandia fadenii
17. S. hildebrandtii - Wielandia mimosoides
18. S. impressa - Heterosavia laurifolia
19. S. laureola - Wielandia laureola
20. S. laurifolia - Heterosavia laurifolia
21. S. longipes - Heterosavia laurifolia
22. S. maculata - Heterosavia maculata
23. S. maroando - Wielandia mimosoides
24. S. membranacea - Heterosavia laurifolia
25. S. mimosoides - Wielandia mimosoides
26. S. oblongifolia - Wielandia oblongifolia
27. S. ovalis - Pseudophyllanthus ovalis
28. S. perlucens - Heterosavia bahamensis
29. S. phyllanthoides - Phyllanthopsis phyllanthoides
30. S. platyrachis - Wielandia platyrachis
31. S. pulchella - Wielandia platyrachis
32. S. ranavalonae - Wielandia ranavalonae
33. S. revoluta - Wielandia bojeriana
34. S. zeylanica - Actephila excelsa
