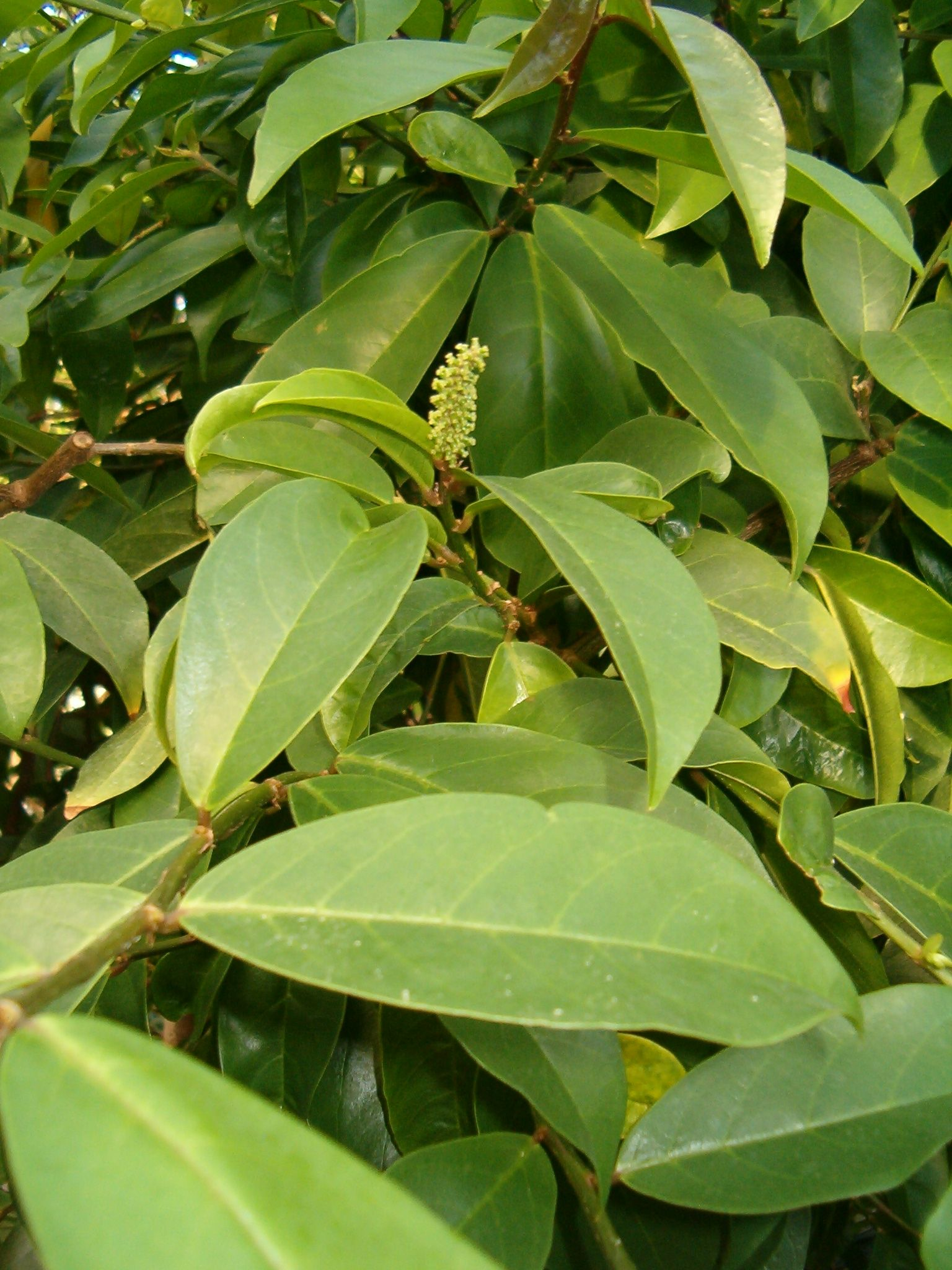
- Antidesma bunius leaves and fruit

Scientific classification
- Kingdom: Plantae
- Clade: Tracheophytes
- Clade: Angiosperms
- Clade: Eudicots
- Clade: Rosids
- Order: Malpighiales
- Family: Phyllanthaceae
- Subfamily: Antidesmatoideae
- Tribe: Antidesmateae

Subtribes and genera
- See text.

= Antidesmateae =

Tribe of flowering plants

Antidesmateae is a tribe of the plant family Phyllanthaceae. It comprises 5 subtribes and 9 genera.

== Subtribes and genera ==
As of February 2023, the Germplasm Resources Information Network (GRIN) accepted the following subtribes and genera:

- Subtribe Antidesmatinae

- Antidesma
- Thecacoris

- Subtribe Hieronyminae:

- Hieronyma

- Subtribe Hymenocardiinae:

- Didymocistus
- Hymenocardia

- Subtribe Leptonematinae:

- Leptonema

- Subtribe Martretiinae:

- Apodiscus
- Martretia

- Unplaced:

- Chonocentrum

== See also ==
- List of Phyllanthaceae genera
