= Lingelsheimia =

Scientific classification
- Kingdom: Plantae
- Clade: Tracheophytes
- Clade: Angiosperms
- Clade: Eudicots
- Clade: Rosids
- Order: Malpighiales
- Family: Phyllanthaceae
- Subfamily: Phyllanthoideae
- Tribe: Phyllantheae
- Genus: Lingelsheimia; Pax

Synonyms
- Danguyodrypetes Leandri; Aerisilvaea Radcl.-Sm.

Genus of flowering plants

Lingelsheimia is a plant genus in the families Phyllanthaceae (and previously placed in the family Putranjivaceae), first described as a genus in 1909. It is native to central Africa and Madagascar.

Species

1. Lingelsheimia abbayesii (Leandri) Radcl.-Sm. - Madagascar
2. Lingelsheimia ambigua (Leandri) Radcl.-Sm. - Madagascar
3. Lingelsheimia fiherenensis (Leandri) Radcl.-Sm. - Madagascar
4. Lingelsheimia frutescens Pax - Gabon, Zaire
5. Lingelsheimia manongarivensis (Leandri) G.L.Webster - Madagascar
6. Lingelsheimia sylvestris (Radcl.-Sm.) Radcl.-Sm. - Tanzania
