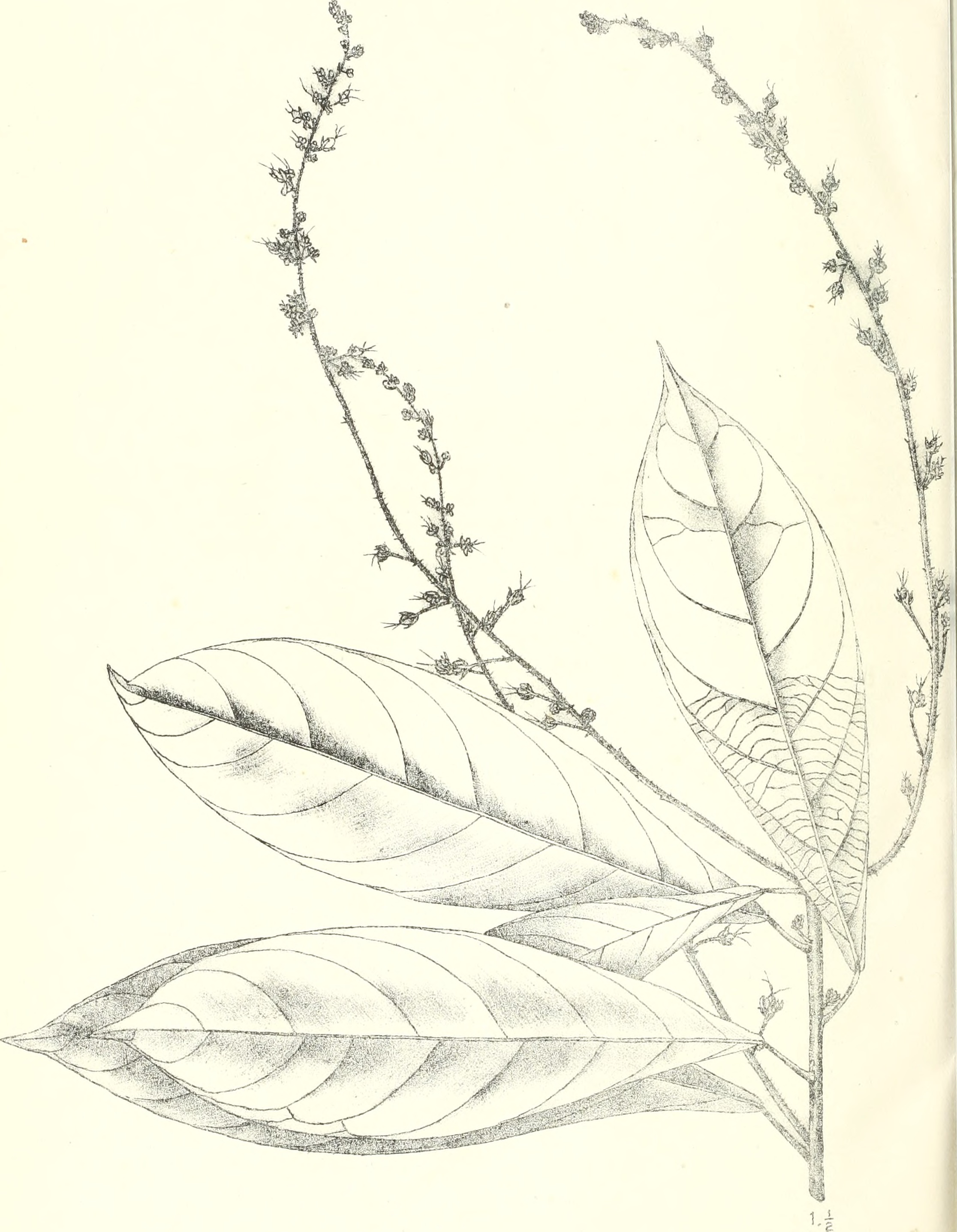
- Dicoelia affinis (now Dicoelia beccariana) botanical drawing, 1918

Scientific classification
- Kingdom: Plantae
- Clade: Tracheophytes
- Clade: Angiosperms
- Clade: Eudicots
- Clade: Rosids
- Order: Malpighiales
- Family: Phyllanthaceae
- Subfamily: Phyllanthoideae
- Tribe: Wielandieae
- Subtribe: Wielandiinae
- Genus: Dicoelia; Benth.

Type species
- Dicoelia beccariana Benth.

= Dicoelia =

Genus of flowering plants

Dicoelia is a plant genus of the family Phyllanthaceae. It was first described as a genus in 1879. It is native to Borneo and Sumatra.

Species

1. Dicoelia beccariana Benth. - Borneo
2. Dicoelia sumatrana Welzen - Sumatra
