= Guarania =

Guarania may refer to:

- Guarania (music), a Paraguayan musical style
- Guarania (plant), a genus of plants in the family Phyllanthaceae
