= Pentabrachion =

Scientific classification
- Kingdom: Plantae
- Clade: Tracheophytes
- Clade: Angiosperms
- Clade: Eudicots
- Clade: Rosids
- Order: Malpighiales
- Family: Phyllanthaceae
- Subfamily: Phyllanthoideae
- Tribe: Bridelieae
- Subtribe: Pseudolachnostylidinae
- Genus: Pentabrachion; Müll.Arg.
- Species: P. reticulatum

Binomial name
- Pentabrachion reticulatum Müll.Arg.

Synonyms
- Actephila reticulata (Müll.Arg.) Pax; Amanoa laurifolia Pax; Actephila africana Pax

Genus of flowering plants

Pentabrachion is a plant genus from the family Phyllanthaceae first described as a genus in 1864. It contains only one known species, Pentabrachion reticulatum, native to tropical Africa (Cameroon, Gabon, Equatorial Guinea, Republic of the Congo, Democratic Republic of the Congo).
