= Leptonema =

Scientific classification
- Kingdom: Plantae
- Clade: Tracheophytes
- Clade: Angiosperms
- Clade: Eudicots
- Clade: Rosids
- Order: Malpighiales
- Family: Phyllanthaceae
- Subfamily: Antidesmatoideae
- Tribe: Antidesmateae
- Subtribe: Leptonematinae
- Genus: Leptonema; A.Juss. 1824 not Hook. 1844 (Brassicaceae)

Genus of flowering plants

Leptonema is a genus of flowering plant belonging to the family Phyllanthaceae first described in 1824. The entire genus is endemic to Madagascar. It is dioecious, with male and female flowers on separate plants.

Species

1. Leptonema glabrum (Leandri) Leandri
2. Leptonema venosum (Poir.) A.Juss.

formerly included

moved to Flueggea

- Leptonema melanthesoides F.Muell. - Flueggea virosa subsp. melanthesoides (F.Muell.) G.L.Webster
