= Distichirhops =

Scientific classification
- Kingdom: Plantae
- Clade: Tracheophytes
- Clade: Angiosperms
- Clade: Eudicots
- Clade: Rosids
- Order: Malpighiales
- Family: Phyllanthaceae
- Subfamily: Antidesmatoideae
- Tribe: Scepeae
- Genus: Distichirhops; Haegens

Type species
- Distichirhops mitsemosik Haegens

Species
- Distichirhops megale; Distichirhops minor; Distichirhops mitsemosik

Genus of flowering plants

Distichirhops is a genus of flowering plant belonging to the family Phyllanthaceae. The genus comprises 3 species, found in the secondary forests of New Guinea and Borneo. The taxon name comes from Greek (distichos meaning "in two rows" and rhopo meaning "shrub"), referring to its distichous leaf arrangement and shrubby habit.

Distichirhops is dioecious, with male and female flowers on separate plants.
