= Spondianthus =

Conservation status
- Least Concern (IUCN 3.1)

Scientific classification
- Kingdom: Plantae
- Clade: Tracheophytes
- Clade: Angiosperms
- Clade: Eudicots
- Clade: Rosids
- Order: Malpighiales
- Family: Phyllanthaceae
- Subfamily: Antidesmatoideae
- Tribe: Spondiantheae
- Genus: Spondianthus; Engl.
- Species: S. preussii

Binomial name
- Spondianthus preussii Engl.

Synonyms
- Megabaria Pierre ex Hutch; Megabaria trillesii Pierre ex Hutch.; Spondianthus glaber Engl.; Spondianthus preussii var. glaber (Engl.) Engl.; Megabaria ugandensis Hutch.; Thecacoris trillesii Beille; Spondianthus ugandensis (Hutch.) Hutch.

Genus of plants

Spondianthus is a genus of plant, in the family Phyllanthaceae and is the only genus comprised in the tribe Spondiantheae. It was first described as a genus in 1905. The genus contains only one recognized species, Spondianthus preussii, widespread across much of tropical Africa from Liberia to Mozambique.

Subspecies

1. Spondianthus preussii subsp. glaber (Engl.) J.Léonard & Nkounkou – from Nigeria to Tanzania south to Angola; also Guinea, Ivory Coast
2. Spondianthus preussii subsp. preussii – from Liberia to Zaire

Formerly included

moved to: Protomegabaria

- Spondianthus obovatus Engl. – Protomegabaria stapfiana (Beille) Hutch.
