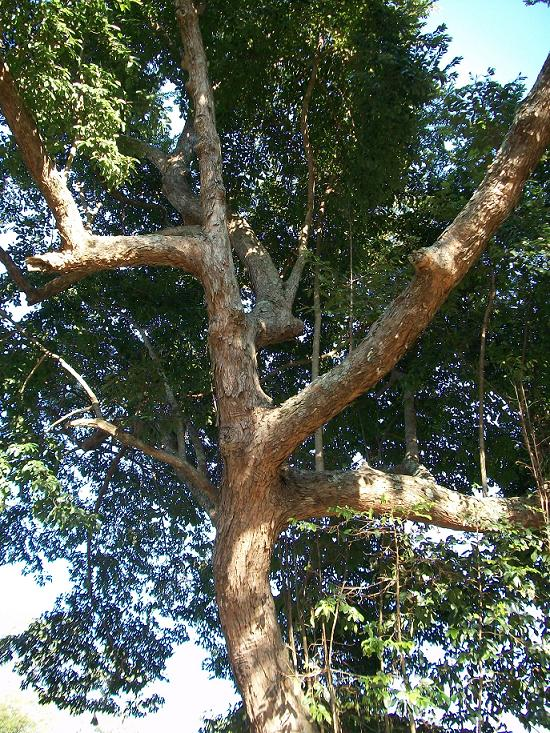
- Margaritaria discoidea

Scientific classification
- Kingdom: Plantae
- Clade: Tracheophytes
- Clade: Angiosperms
- Clade: Eudicots
- Clade: Rosids
- Order: Malpighiales
- Family: Phyllanthaceae
- Subfamily: Phyllanthoideae
- Tribe: Phyllantheae
- Genus: Margaritaria; L.f. 1782 not L. 1775 (the latter not validly published)

Synonyms
- Calococcus Kurz ex Teijsm.; Prosorus Dalzell; Wurtzia Baill.; Zygospermum Thwaites ex Baill.

= Margaritaria =

Genus of flowering plants

Margaritaria is a plant genus of the family Phyllanthaceae first published as a genus in 1782. It is the smallest pantropical genus of the Phyllanthaceae and, formerly, of the Euphorbiaceae, widely distributed in tropical and subtropical regions of Asia, Africa, Australia, North and South America, and various oceanic islands.

Species

- Margaritaria anomala - Aldabra, Comoros, Madagascar, Mauritius
- Margaritaria cyanosperma - Sri Lanka
- Margaritaria decaryana - S Madagascar
- Margaritaria discoidea - Sub-Saharan Africa
- Margaritaria dubium-traceyi - N Queensland
- Margaritaria hispidula - SW Madagascar
- Margaritaria hotteana - Hispaniola
- Margaritaria indica - SE Asia, S China, India, Sri Lanka, New Guinea, Queensland
- Margaritaria luzoniensis - Luzon
- Margaritaria nobilis- Mexico, Central America, South America, West Indies
- Margaritaria rhomboidalis - Madagascar
- Margaritaria scandens - Bahamas, Cuba
- Margaritaria tetracocca - Cuba, Haiti
