= Wielandieae =

Scientific classification
- Kingdom: Plantae
- Clade: Tracheophytes
- Clade: Angiosperms
- Clade: Eudicots
- Clade: Rosids
- Order: Malpighiales
- Family: Phyllanthaceae
- Subfamily: Phyllanthoideae
- Tribe: Wielandieae; Baill. ex Hurus.

Genera
- Astrocasia Blotia Discocarpus Gonatogyne Heywoodia Lachnostylis Petalodiscus Savia (also Charidia, Geminaria, Kleinodendron, Maschalanthus) Wielandia

Tribe of flowering plants

Wielandieae is a tribe of the family Phyllanthaceae. It comprises 9 genera.
