= Nothobaccaurea =

Scientific classification
- Kingdom: Plantae
- Clade: Tracheophytes
- Clade: Angiosperms
- Clade: Eudicots
- Clade: Rosids
- Order: Malpighiales
- Family: Phyllanthaceae
- Subfamily: Antidesmatoideae
- Tribe: Scepeae
- Genus: Nothobaccaurea; Haegens

Type species
- Nothobaccaurea stylaris (Müll.Arg.) Haegens

Genus of flowering plants

Nothobaccaurea is a genus of flowering plant belonging to the family Phyllanthaceae, first described as a genus in 2000. It is native to various islands in the Pacific. The genus is named for its false resemblance with Baccaurea. Like Baccaurea, it is dioecious, with male and female flowers on separate plants.

Nothobaccaurea grows in primary or secondary rain forest. In Fiji it is known by a number of local names, innoka, kailoa, midra, sinumbuta, and vurevure. Nothobaccaurea is a shrub or tree that grows between 2–20 metres in height, it flowers and fruits throughout the year.

Species

- Nothobaccaurea pulvinata (A.C.Sm.) Haegens - Viti Levu
- Nothobaccaurea stylaris (Müll.Arg.) Haegens - Solomon Islands, Santa Cruz Islands, Fiji, Vanuatu
