= Tacarcuna =

Scientific classification
- Kingdom: Plantae
- Clade: Tracheophytes
- Clade: Angiosperms
- Clade: Eudicots
- Clade: Rosids
- Order: Malpighiales
- Family: Phyllanthaceae
- Subfamily: Phyllanthoideae
- Tribe: Bridelieae
- Subtribe: Saviinae
- Genus: Tacarcuna; Huft.

Type species
- Tacarcuna gentryi Huft

Genus of flowering plants

Tacarcuna is a genus of plants in the Phyllanthaceae first described as a genus in 1989. It is native to Panama, Colombia, Venezuela, and Peru. It is apparently dioecious, with male and female flowers on separate plants.

Species

1. Tacarcuna amanoifolia Huft - Loreto Region in Peru; Amazonas Department in Colombia
2. Tacarcuna gentryi Huft - Darién Province in Panama, Magdalena Department in Colombia
3. Tacarcuna tachirensis Huft - Táchira State in Venezuela
