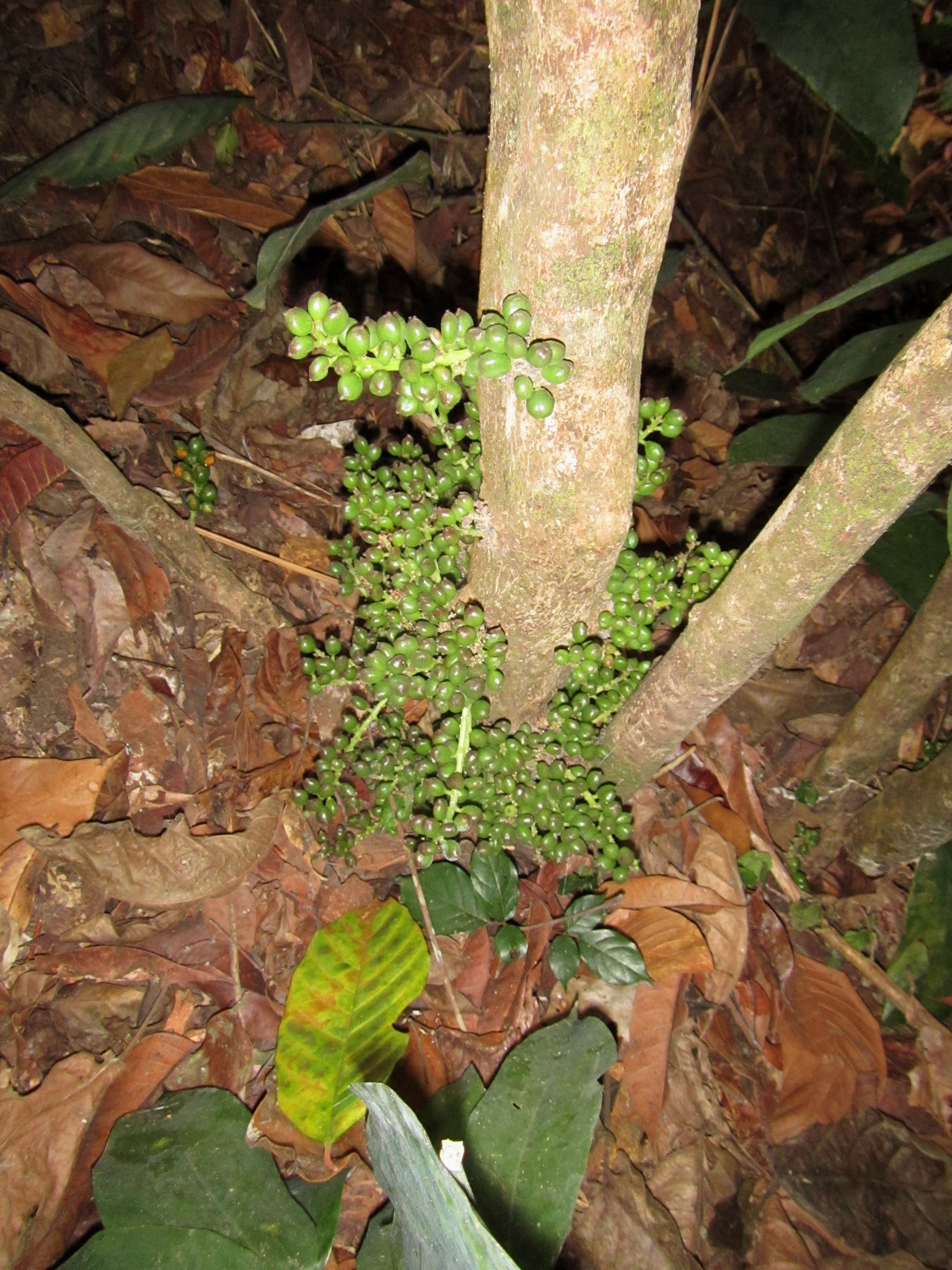

Scientific classification
- Kingdom: Plantae
- Clade: Tracheophytes
- Clade: Angiosperms
- Clade: Eudicots
- Clade: Rosids
- Order: Malpighiales
- Family: Phyllanthaceae
- Subfamily: Antidesmatoideae
- Tribe: Scepeae
- Genus: Maesobotrya; Benth.

Synonyms
- Staphysora Pierre

= Maesobotrya =

Genus of flowering plants

Maesobotrya is a genus of flowering plants belonging to the family Phyllanthaceae. It was first described as a genus in 1879 and is native to sub-Saharan Africa. It is dioecious, with male and female flowers on separate plants.

== Species ==
The following species are recognised in the genus Maesobotrya:

- Maesobotrya barteri - West and Central Africa
- Maesobotrya bertramiana - Central Africa
- Maesobotrya cordulata - Republic of the Congo, Gabon, Democratic Republic of the Congo
- Maesobotrya fallax - Cameroon
- Maesobotrya floribunda - Central Africa
- Maesobotrya glabrata - São Tomé, Príncipe
- Maesobotrya griffoniana - Central Africa
- Maesobotrya klaineana - Central Africa
- Maesobotrya liberica - Liberia
- Maesobotrya longipes - Central Africa
- Maesobotrya oligantha - Gabon, Equatorial Guinea
- Maesobotrya pauciflora - Central Africa
- Maesobotrya pierlotii - Democratic Republic of the Congo
- Maesobotrya purseglovei - Democratic Republic of the Congo, Uganda
- Maesobotrya pynaertii - Democratic Republic of the Congo
- Maesobotrya scariosa - Cameroon
- Maesobotrya staudtii - Central Africa
- Maesobotrya vermeulenii - Central Africa
- Maesobotrya villosa - Democratic Republic of the Congo

Formerly included

- Maesobotrya oblonga - moved to Antidesma oblongum
- Maesobotrya stapfiana - moved to Protomegabaria stapfiana
