= Apodiscus =

Conservation status
- Endangered (IUCN 3.1)

Scientific classification
- Kingdom: Plantae
- Clade: Tracheophytes
- Clade: Angiosperms
- Clade: Eudicots
- Clade: Rosids
- Order: Malpighiales
- Family: Phyllanthaceae
- Subfamily: Antidesmatoideae
- Tribe: Antidesmateae
- Subtribe: Martretiinae
- Genus: Apodiscus; Hutch.
- Species: A. chevalieri

Binomial name
- Apodiscus chevalieri Hutch.

Genus of flowering plants

Apodiscus is a genus of trees belonging to the family Phyllanthaceae first described as a genus in 1912. It contains only one known species, Apodiscus chevalieri, native to tropical West Africa (Guinea, Liberia and possibly Sierra Leone).
