= Celianella =

Scientific classification
- Kingdom: Plantae
- Clade: Tracheophytes
- Clade: Angiosperms
- Clade: Eudicots
- Clade: Rosids
- Order: Malpighiales
- Family: Phyllanthaceae
- Subfamily: Antidesmatoideae
- Tribe: Jablonskieae
- Genus: Celianella; Jabl.
- Species: C. montana

Binomial name
- Celianella montana Jabl.

Genus of flowering plants

Celianella is a genus of plants belonging to the family Phyllanthaceae first described in 1965. It has only one known species, Celianella montana, native to Guyana and to southern Venezuela (States of Amazonas + Bolívar). It is dioecious, with male and female flowers on separate plants.
