= Croizatia =

Scientific classification
- Kingdom: Plantae
- Clade: Tracheophytes
- Clade: Angiosperms
- Clade: Eudicots
- Clade: Rosids
- Order: Malpighiales
- Family: Phyllanthaceae
- Subfamily: Phyllanthoideae
- Tribe: Bridelieae
- Subtribe: Saviinae
- Genus: Croizatia; Steyerm.

Synonyms
- Pseudosagotia Secco

Genus of flowering plants

Croizatia is a small genus of plants in the Phyllanthaceae first described as a genus in 1952. It is native to Panama and to northwestern South America. It is dioecious, with male and female flowers on separate plants.

species

1. Croizatia brevipetiolata (Secco) Dorr - Colombia, NW Venezuela
2. Croizatia cimalonia Cerón & G.L.Webster - Ecuador
3. Croizatia naiguatensis Steyerm. - N Colombia, N Venezuela
4. Croizatia neotropica Steyerm. - N Venezuela, Vaupés in E Colombia
5. Croizatia panamensis G.L.Webster - Panama, NW Colombia
