= Chascotheca =

Scientific classification
- Kingdom: Plantae
- Clade: Tracheophytes
- Clade: Angiosperms
- Clade: Eudicots
- Clade: Rosids
- Order: Malpighiales
- Family: Phyllanthaceae
- Subfamily: Phyllanthoideae
- Tribe: Wielandieae
- Subtribe: Astrocasiinae
- Genus: Chascotheca; Urb.

Synonyms
- Chaenotheca Urb.

Genus of flowering plants

Chascotheca is a genus of plants in the family Phyllanthaceae described as a genus in 1904. It is native to the western Caribbean.

Species

1. Chascotheca neopeltandra (Griseb.) Urb. - Cuba, Hispaniola, Cayman Islands
2. Chascotheca triplinervia (Müll.Arg.) G.L.Webster - Cuba
