= Discocarpus =

Scientific classification
- Kingdom: Plantae
- Clade: Tracheophytes
- Clade: Angiosperms
- Clade: Eudicots
- Clade: Rosids
- Order: Malpighiales
- Family: Phyllanthaceae
- Subfamily: Phyllanthoideae
- Tribe: Bridelieae
- Subtribe: Saviinae
- Genus: Discocarpus; Klotzsch 1841 not Liebm. 1851 (Urticaceae)

Genus of flowering plants

Discocarpus is a genus of the plant family Phyllanthaceae first described as a genus in 1841. It is native to northern South America. It is dioecious, with male and female flowers on separate plants.

Species

1. Discocarpus essequeboensis Klotzsch - Brazil (Amazonas, Pará, Amapá), Venezuela (Amazonas), Guyana (Essequibo, Rupununi), Suriname, French Guiana
2. Discocarpus gentryi S.M.Hayden - S Venezuela (Amazonas), Peru (Loreto), N Brazil
3. Discocarpus pedicellatus Fiaschi & Cordeiro - State of Bahia in Brazil
4. Discocarpus spruceanus Müll.Arg. - Venezuela (Amazonas), Brazil (Amazonas, Pará, Mato Grosso), Suriname (Sipaliwini), Bolivia (Santa Cruz)

Formerly included

moved to other genera: Chaetocarpus Lachnostylis

1. Discocarpus duckeanus Jabl. - Chaetocarpus echinocarpus (Baill.) Ducke
2. Discocarpus hirtus (L.f.) Pax & K.Hoffm. - Lachnostylis hirta (L.f.) Müll.Arg.
3. Discocarpus mazarunensis Croizat - Chaetocarpus schomburgkianus (Kuntze) Pax & K.Hoffm.

Names in Urticaceae

In 1851, Liebmann used the same name, Discocarpus, to refer to some plants in the Urticaceae. Thus he created an illegitimate homonym, so his usage of the name had to be abandoned. Species names created in Urticaceae:

1. Discocarpus mexicanus Liebm. - Discocnide mexicana (Liebm.) Chew
2. Discocarpus nicaraguensis Liebm. - Discocnide mexicana (Liebm.) Chew
