= Ashtonia =

Scientific classification
- Kingdom: Plantae
- Clade: Tracheophytes
- Clade: Angiosperms
- Clade: Eudicots
- Clade: Rosids
- Order: Malpighiales
- Family: Phyllanthaceae
- Subfamily: Antidesmatoideae
- Tribe: Scepeae
- Genus: Ashtonia; Airy Shaw

Genus of flowering plants

Ashtonia is a genus of flowering plant belonging to the family Phyllanthaceae first described as a genus in 1968. It is native to the Malay Peninsula and Borneo. It is dioecious, with male and female flowers on separate plants.

species

1. Ashtonia excelsa Airy Shaw - Borneo
2. Ashtonia praeterita Airy Shaw - S Thailand, W Malaysia
