= Beillé =

- Commune
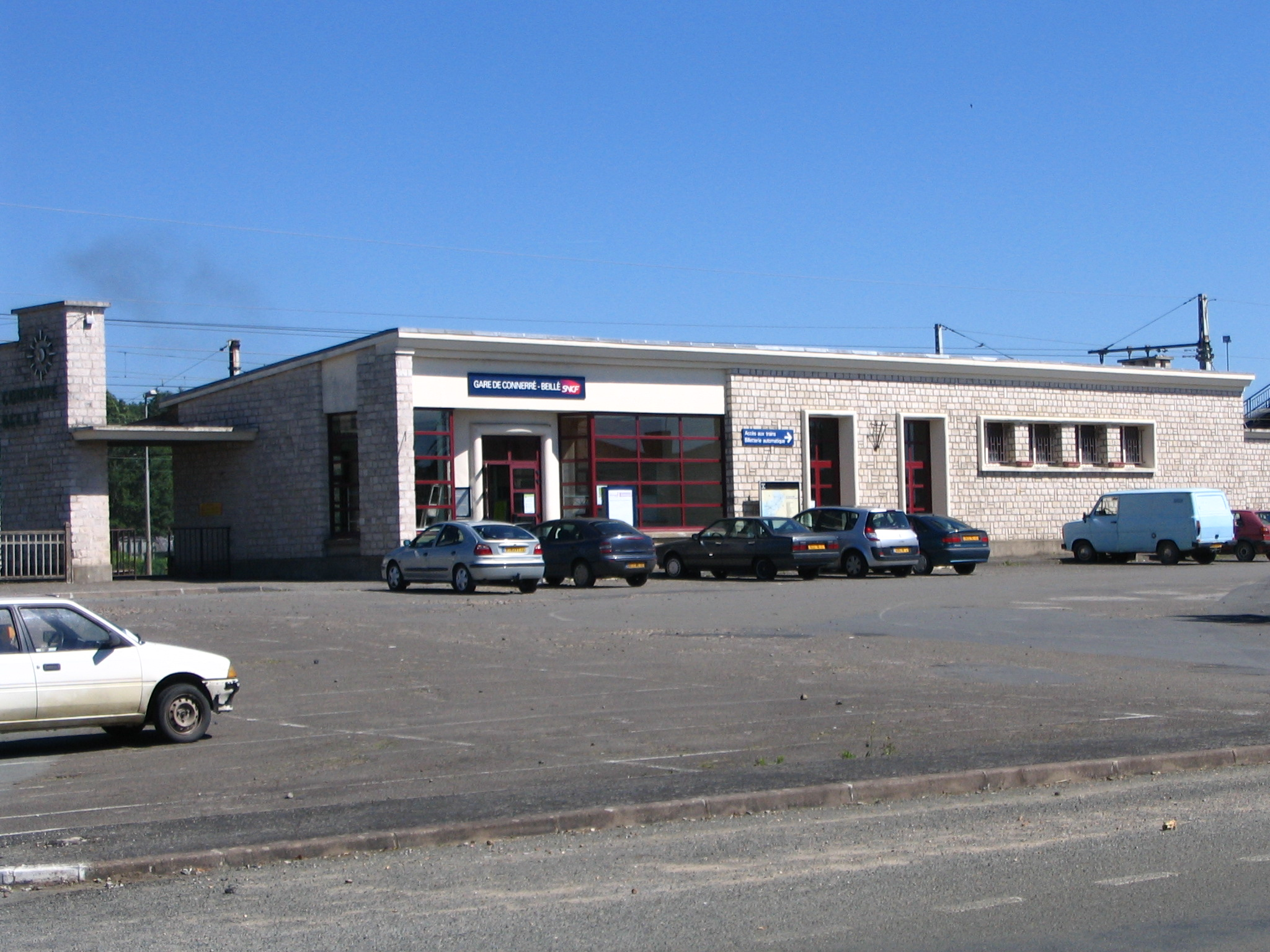
- The railway station

- Coat of arms
- Location of Beillé
- Location within France Location within Pays de la Loire
- Coordinates: 48°04′58″N 0°30′49″E
- Country: France
- Region: Pays de la Loire
- Department: Sarthe
- Arrondissement: Mamers
- Canton: La Ferté-Bernard
- Intercommunality: CC du Perche Emeraude

Government
  - Mayor (2020–2026): Arnault De Calonne
- Area^{1}: 8 km^{2} (3.1 sq mi)
- Population (2023): 542
  - Density: 68/km^{2} (180/sq mi)
- Demonym(s): Beilléen, Beilléenne
- Time zone: UTC+01:00 (CET)
  - Summer (DST): UTC+02:00 (CEST)
- INSEE/Postal code: 72031 /72160
- ^{1} French Land Register data, which excludes lakes, ponds, glaciers > 1 km^{2} (0.386 sq mi or 247 acres) and river estuaries.

Beillé (French pronunciation: [bɛje]) is a commune in the Sarthe department in the region of Pays de la Loire in north-western France.

== See also ==
- Communes of the Sarthe department
