= Ivan Martinov =

Russian botanist and philologist

- Иван Иванович Мартынов
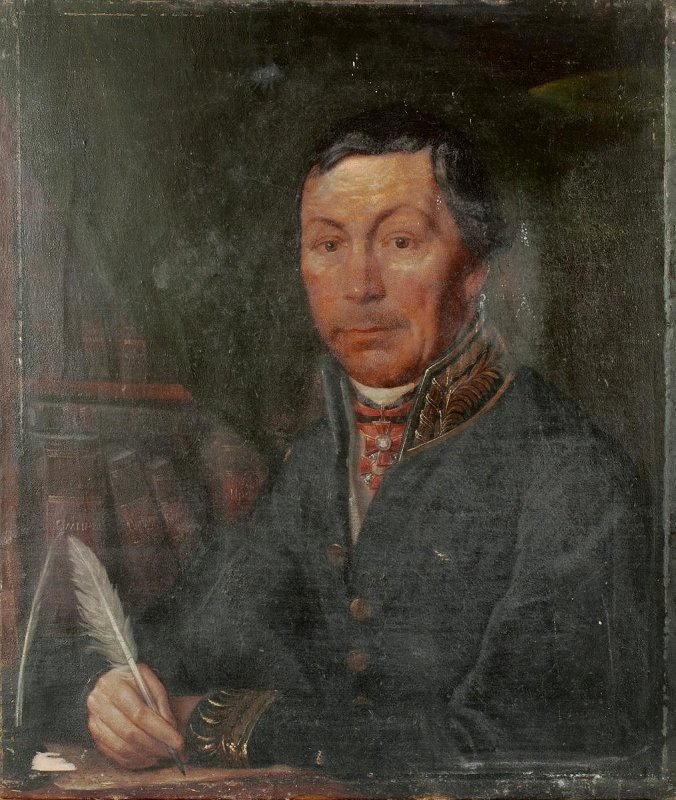
- Ivan Martynov in 1820
- Born: 1771
- Died: October 20 (November 1), 1833; Saint Petersburg, Russian Empire
- Occupation(s): Linguist, writer, botanist, philologist, translator, poet

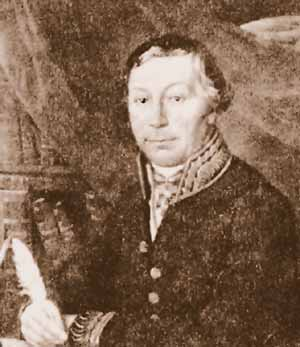
Ivan Martinov

Ivan Ivanovich Martinov (the last name also spelled Martynov, Russian: Иван Иванович Мартынов; 1771 – 1833 in Saint Peterburg) was a Russian botanist and philologist.

He died on October 20 (November 1), 1833.
