= Wielandia =

Scientific classification
- Kingdom: Plantae
- Clade: Tracheophytes
- Clade: Angiosperms
- Clade: Eudicots
- Clade: Rosids
- Order: Malpighiales
- Family: Phyllanthaceae
- Subfamily: Phyllanthoideae
- Tribe: Wielandieae
- Subtribe: Wielandiinae
- Genus: Wielandia; Baill.

Type species
- Wielandia elegans Baill.

Synonyms
- Charidia Baill.; Petalodiscus (Baill.) Pax; Blotia Leandri

Genus of flowering plants

Wielandia is a genus of flowering plant, of the family Phyllanthaceae first described as a genus in 1858. The plants are native to Kenya, Madagascar, and to various other islands in the Indian Ocean.

Species

1. Wielandia bemarensis - N Madagascar
2. Wielandia bojeriana - C Madagascar
3. Wielandia danguyana - C Madagascar
4. Wielandia elegans - Aldabra, Seychelles, Comoros, Madagascar
5. Wielandia fadenii - SE Kenya, Madagascar
6. Wielandia laureola - Madagascar
7. Wielandia leandriana - E Madagascar
8. Wielandia mimosoides - C + E Madagascar
9. Wielandia oblongifolia - E Madagascar
10. Wielandia platyrachis - Madagascar
11. Wielandia ranavalonae - C Madagascar
12. Wielandia tanalorum - N + E Madagascar
13. Wielandia unifex - Madagascar
