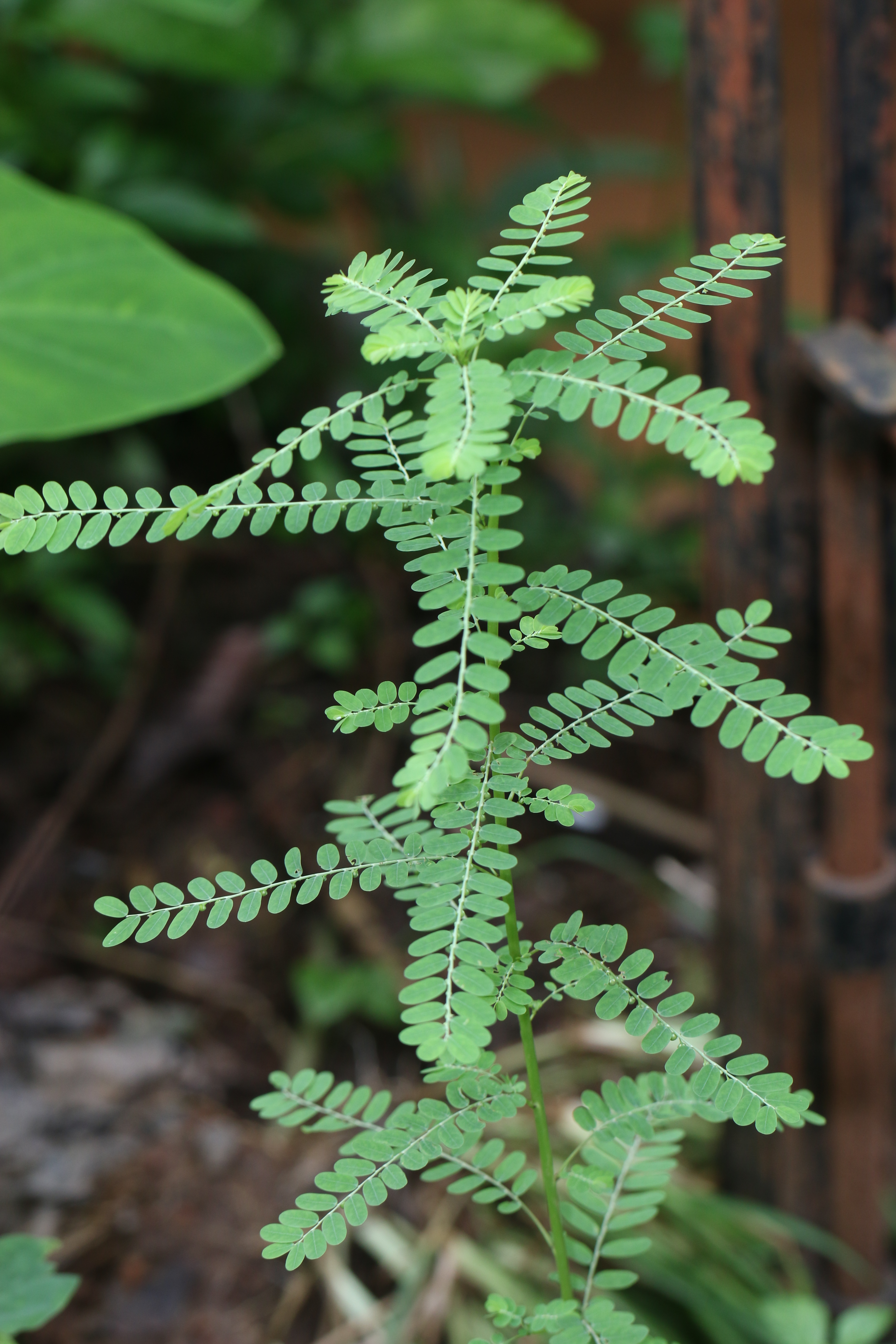
- Phyllanthus niruri

Scientific classification
- Kingdom: Plantae
- Clade: Tracheophytes
- Clade: Angiosperms
- Clade: Eudicots
- Clade: Rosids
- Order: Malpighiales
- Family: Phyllanthaceae; Martynov

Tribes
- See text

= Phyllanthaceae =

Phyllanthaceae Temporal range: Maastrichtian – recent

Family of flowering plants

Phyllanthaceae, commonly known as the leaf-flower family, is a family of flowering plants in the eudicot order Malpighiales. It is most closely related to the family Picrodendraceae.

The Phyllanthaceae are most numerous in the tropics, with many in the south temperate zone, and a few ranging as far north as the middle of the north temperate zone.

Some species of Andrachne, Antidesma, Margaritaria, and Phyllanthus are in cultivation. A few species of Antidesma, Baccaurea, Phyllanthus, and Uapaca bear edible fruit.

Phyllanthaceae comprises about 2000 species. Depending on the author, these are grouped into 54 to 60 genera. Some of the genera are poorly defined, and the number of genera in the family is likely to change as the classification is further refined. The genus Phyllanthus, one of the largest genera of flowering plants with over 1200 species, has more than half of the species in the family.

Some of the genera have recently been sunk into others, while other genera have recently been divided. The largest genera and the approximate number of species in each are: Phyllanthus (1270), Cleistanthus (140), Antidesma (100), Aporosa (90), Uapaca (60), Baccaurea (50), and Bridelia (50).

Since Phyllanthaceae was revised in 2006, one paper has removed Heterosavia from Savia. Another has separated Notoleptopus from Leptopus, and segregated Pseudophyllanthus and Phyllanthopsis from Andrachne. Also, Oreoporanthera has been subsumed into Poranthera, while Zimmermannia and Zimmermanniopsis have been sunk into Meineckia. The large genus Cleistanthus is known to be polyphyletic, but further studies will be needed before it can be revised.

== Description ==
The description here is from Hoffmann, except for a few additions from Webster and Hutchinson where cited. Phyllanthaceae is an unusually diverse family for its moderate size. It can be recognized only by a combination of characters because there are a few exceptions to almost everything that is generally true of the family. It is most notable for having two ovules in each locule of the ovary, a trait that clearly distinguishes it from Euphorbiaceae.

The Phyllanthaceae are nearly all trees, shrubs, or herbs. A few are climbers, or succulents, and one species, Phyllanthus fluitans, is aquatic. Unlike many of the Euphorbiaceae, none has latex, and only a very few produce a resinous exudate. Any hairs, if present, are almost always simple. Rarely are they branched or scale-like. Thorns and other armament are rare.

Stipules are produced with each leaf, but in some, these fall before the leaf is fully mature. Leaves are present, except for a few species of Phyllanthus that have flattened, leaflike stems called cladodes that bear flowers along their edges. The leaves are compound in Bischofia, but otherwise simple and usually alternate. Rarely are they opposite, in fascicles, or in whorls around the stem. The leaf margin is almost always entire, rarely toothed. A petiole is nearly always present, often with a pulvinus at its base.

The inflorescences are usually in the axils of leaves, rarely below the leaves or at the ends of stems. In Uapaca, the flowers are in a pseudanthium, a tight bundle of flowers that resembles a single flower.

Except for four species of Aporosa, the flowers are unisexual, the plants being either monoecious or dioecious. The flowers are actinomorphic in form. Detailed illustrations have been published for some of these.

The sepals are three to eight in number, usually free from each other. Petals may be absent or present. If present, there are usually four to six, and their color is yellow to green, or rarely, pink or maroon.

A nectary disk is often present. It may be in the form of a ring, or divided into segments. The stamens are three to ten in number, or rarely more, free or variously fused.

The ovary is superior. The number of locules in the ovary is highly variable, usually from two to five, but sometimes as many as fifteen. The placentation is apical, with a pair of ovules hanging by their funicles from the top of each locule. Often, only one of the ovules will develop into a seed. A single, massive obturator may cover the micropyles of both ovules, or each ovule may have its own thin obturator. The megagametophyte is of the Polygonum type. The style is usually 2-lobed or bifid, sometimes entire, or rarely multifid.

The fruit is a schizocarp, drupe, or berry. In some, the schizocarp breaks up explosively.

== Taxonomy ==
=== History ===
The name "Phyllanthaceae" was first validly published by Ivan Ivanovich Martynov in 1820 in a Russian book entitled Tekhno-botanico Slovar. A proposal to conserve this name was published in 2007.

Martynov's name was rarely used in the 180 years after he published it. During that time, the plants that are now in Phyllanthaceae were placed in the large and heterogeneous family Euphorbiaceae. The monophyly of Euphorbiaceae had long been held in doubt by some, but the first strong evidence of its polyphyly came in 1993 with the first maximum parsimony analysis of DNA sequences of the gene rbcL from a large number of seed plants. Since the 1993 study, all subsequent phylogenetic analyses have shown that the old concept of Euphorbiaceae consisted of several lineages that did not together form a clade in the order Malpighiales. Euphorbiaceae is now defined as a much smaller family than it had been in the twentieth century. Pandaceae, Phyllanthaceae, Picrodendraceae, Putranjivaceae, Peraceae, and Centroplacaceae have been removed from it.

The obsolete, older concept of Euphorbiaceae, known as Euphorbiaceae sensu lato, is sometimes still used for continuity and convenience. It was the subject of a book and two papers which stood as the standard works on Phyllanthaceae until that family was revised by Hoffmann and co-authors in 2006.

=== Classification ===
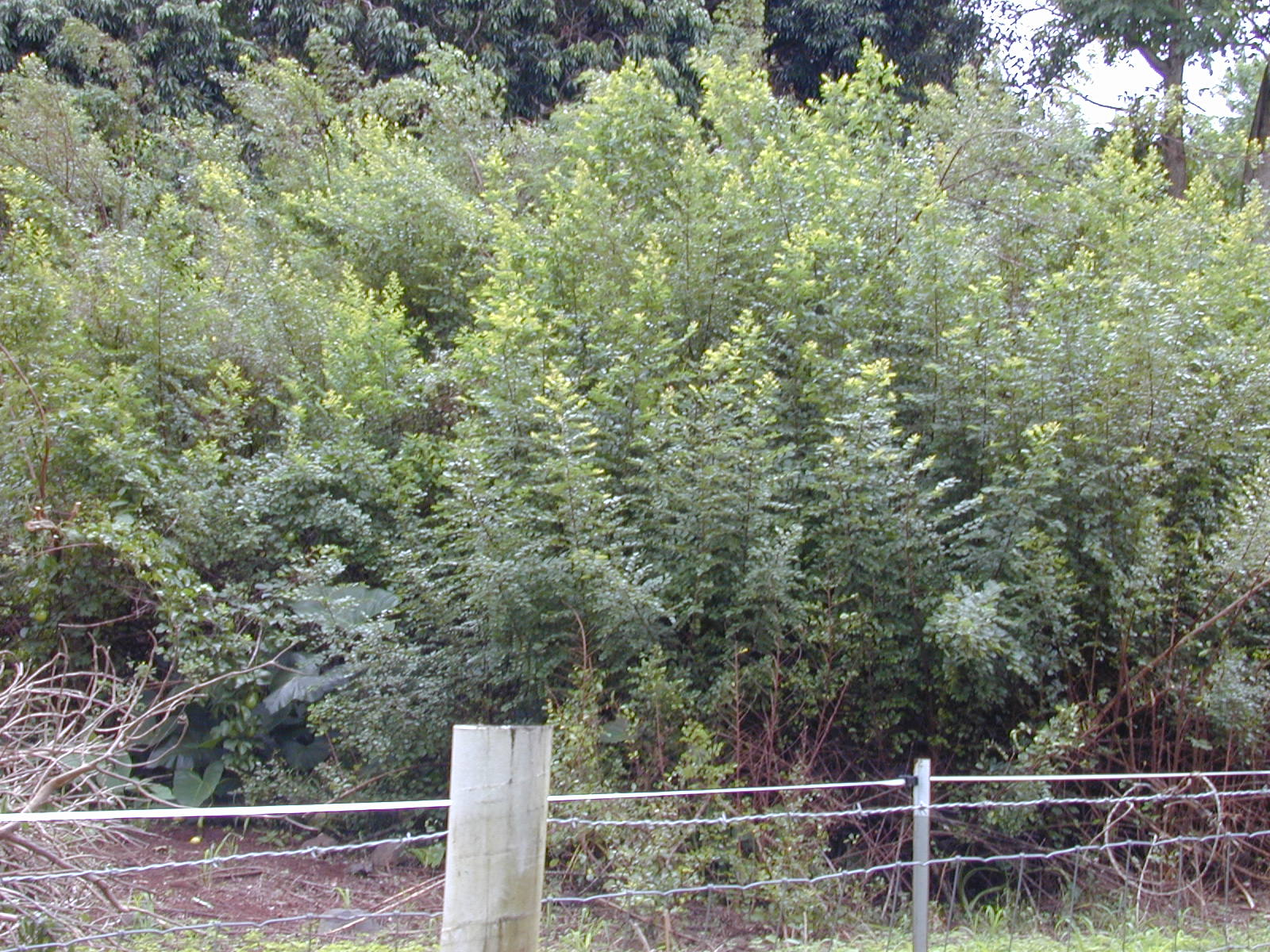
Flueggea virosa

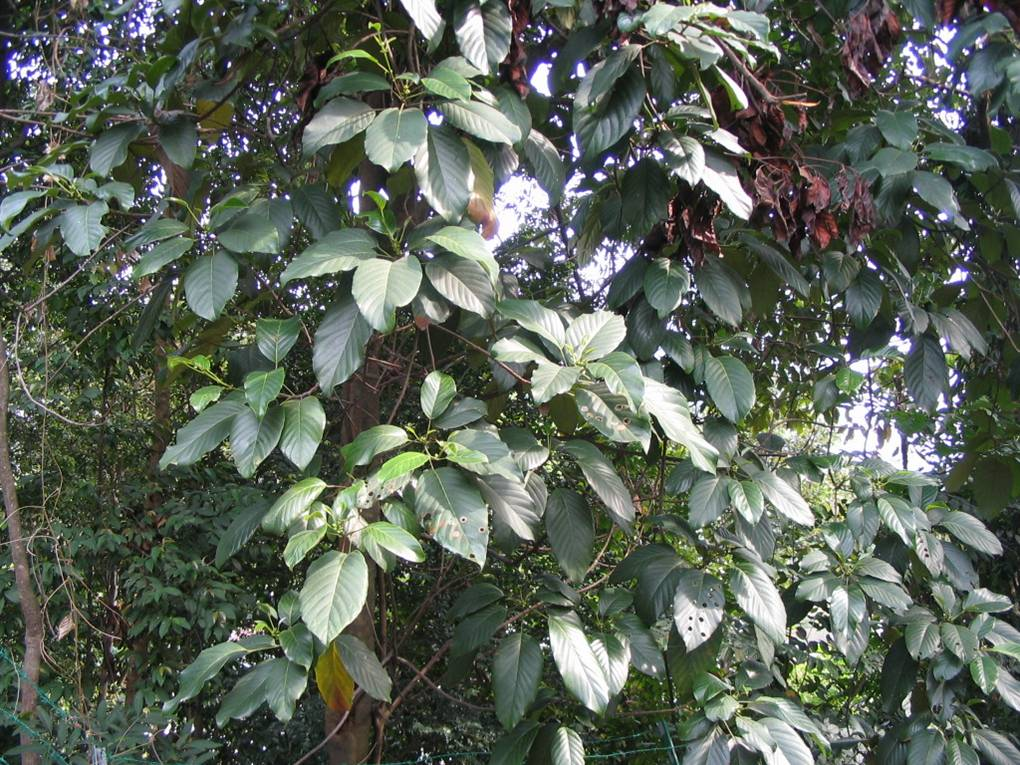
Baccaurea brevipes

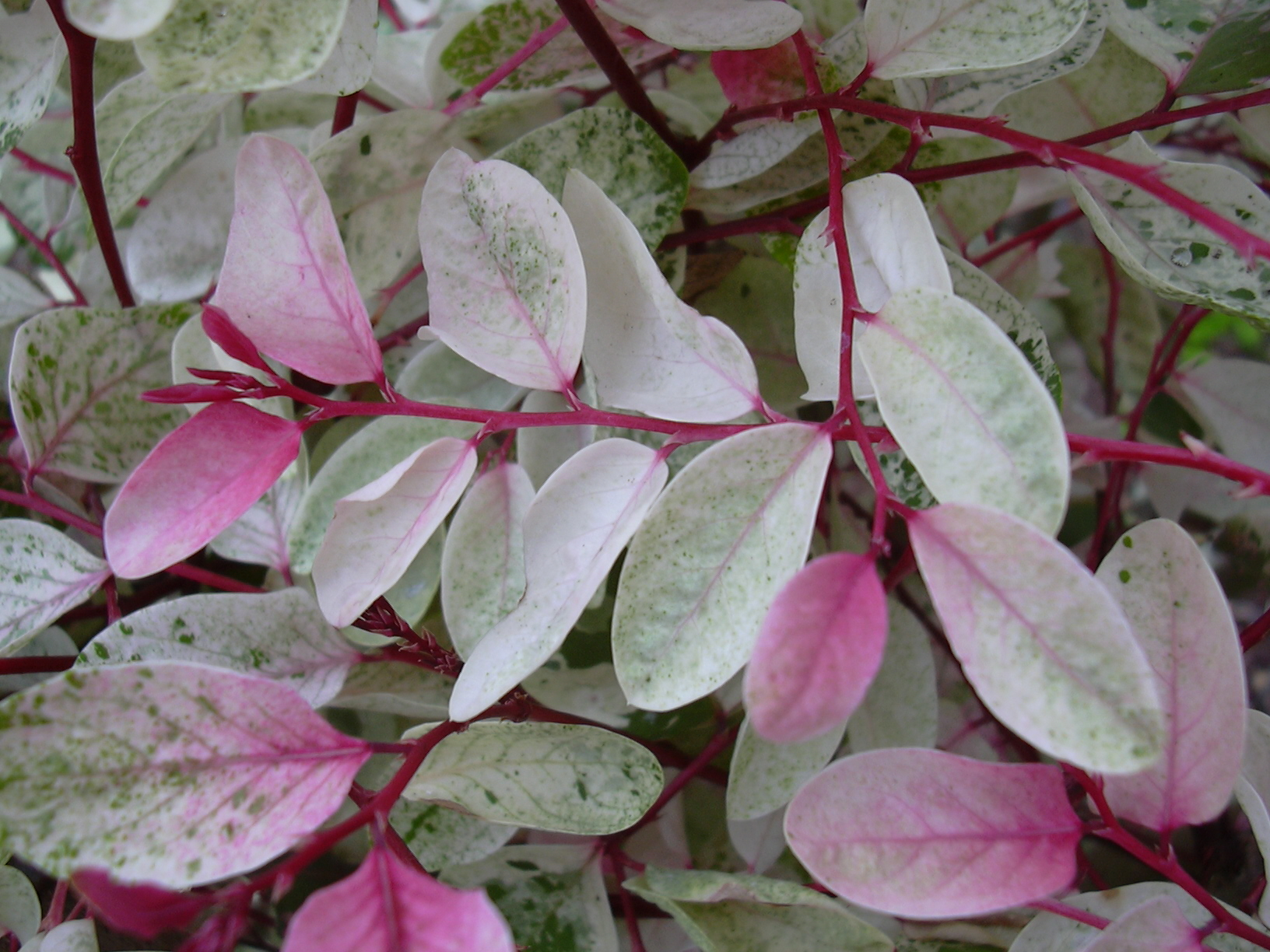
Leaves of Phyllanthus (Breynia) disticha

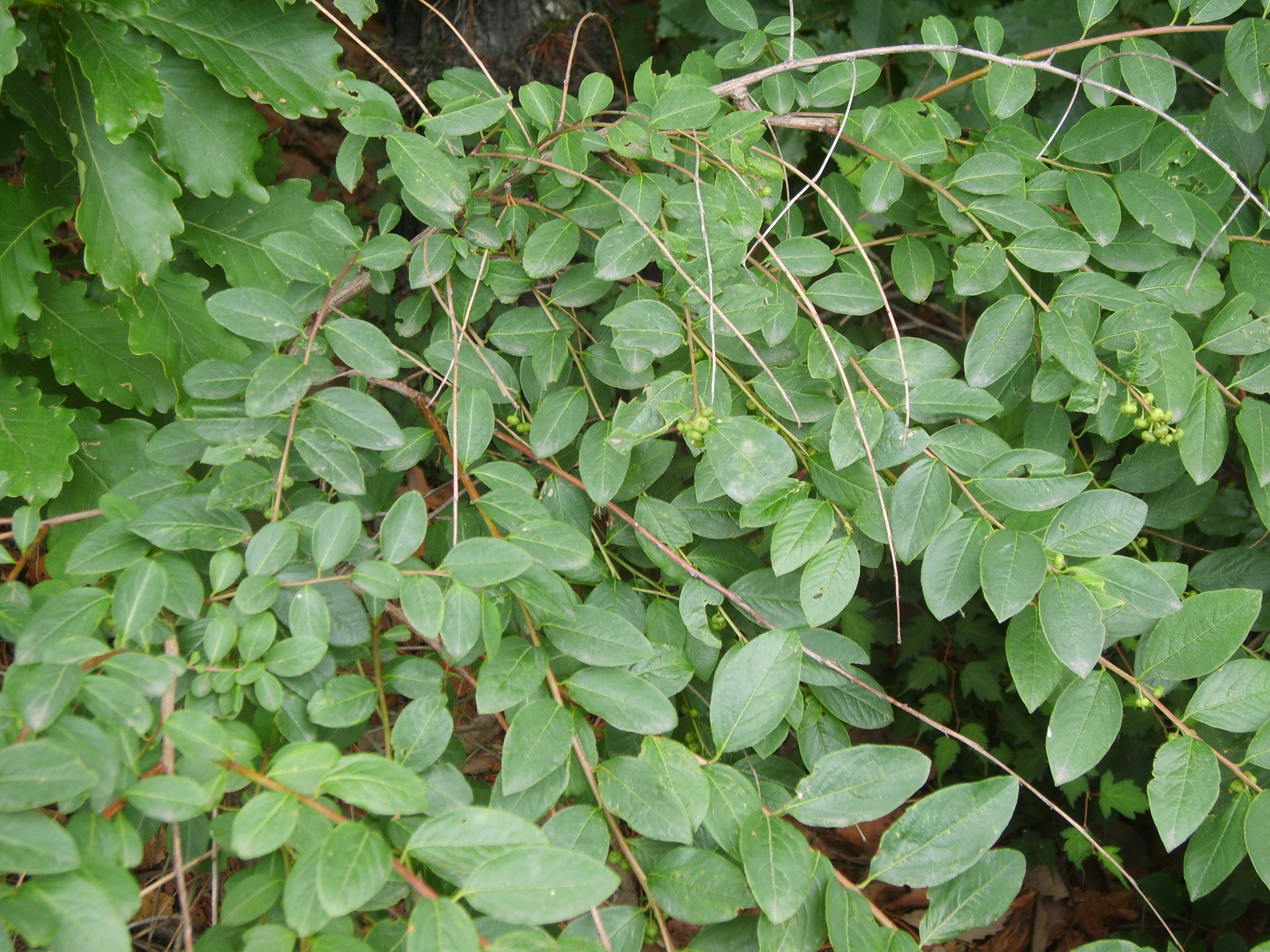
Securinega suffruticosa

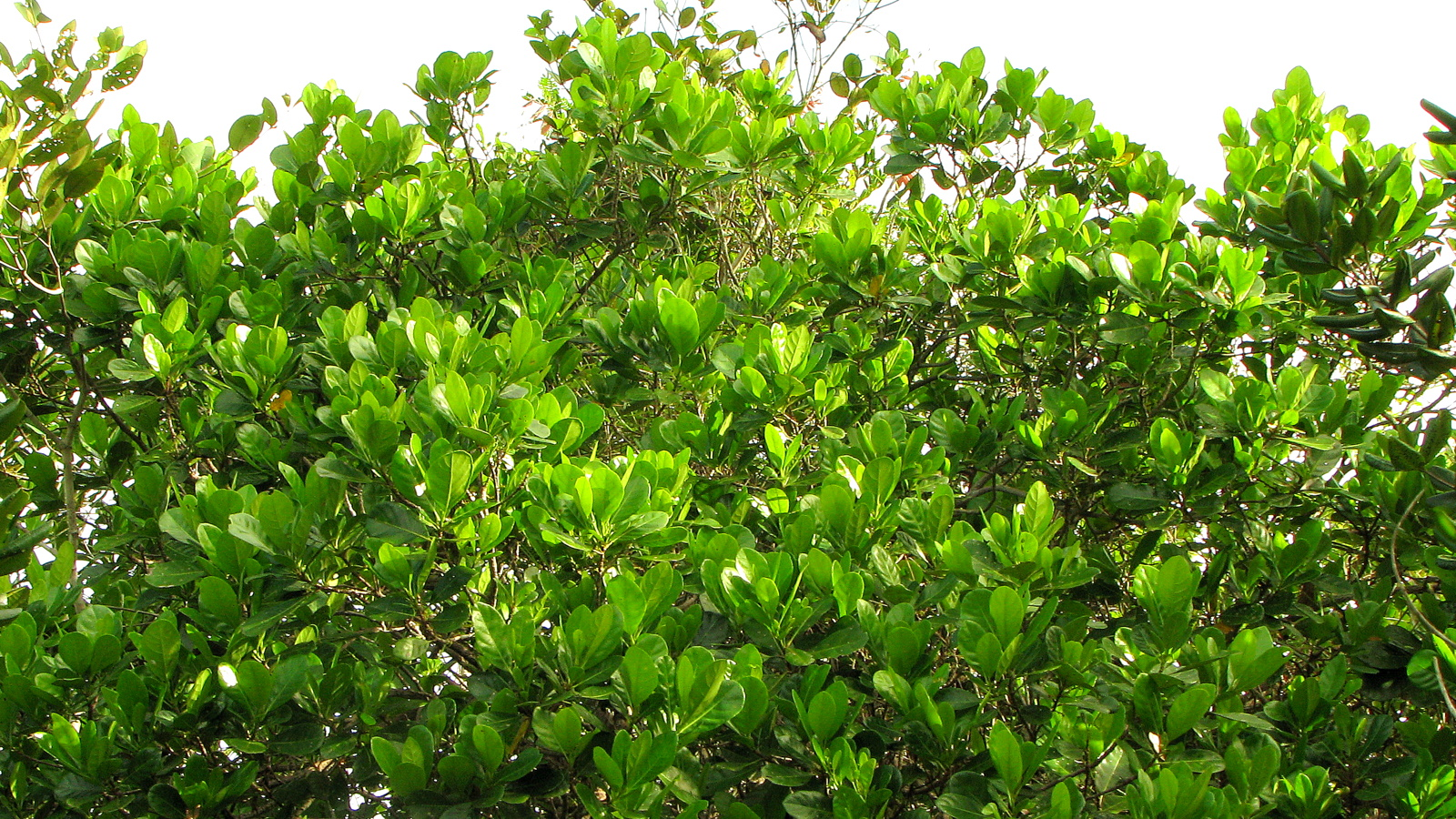
Richeria grandis

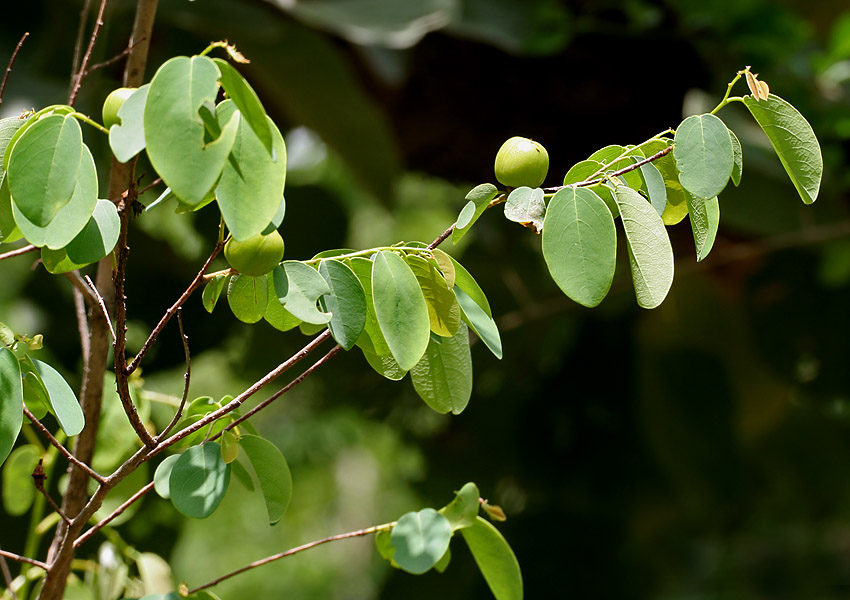
Cleistanthus collinus

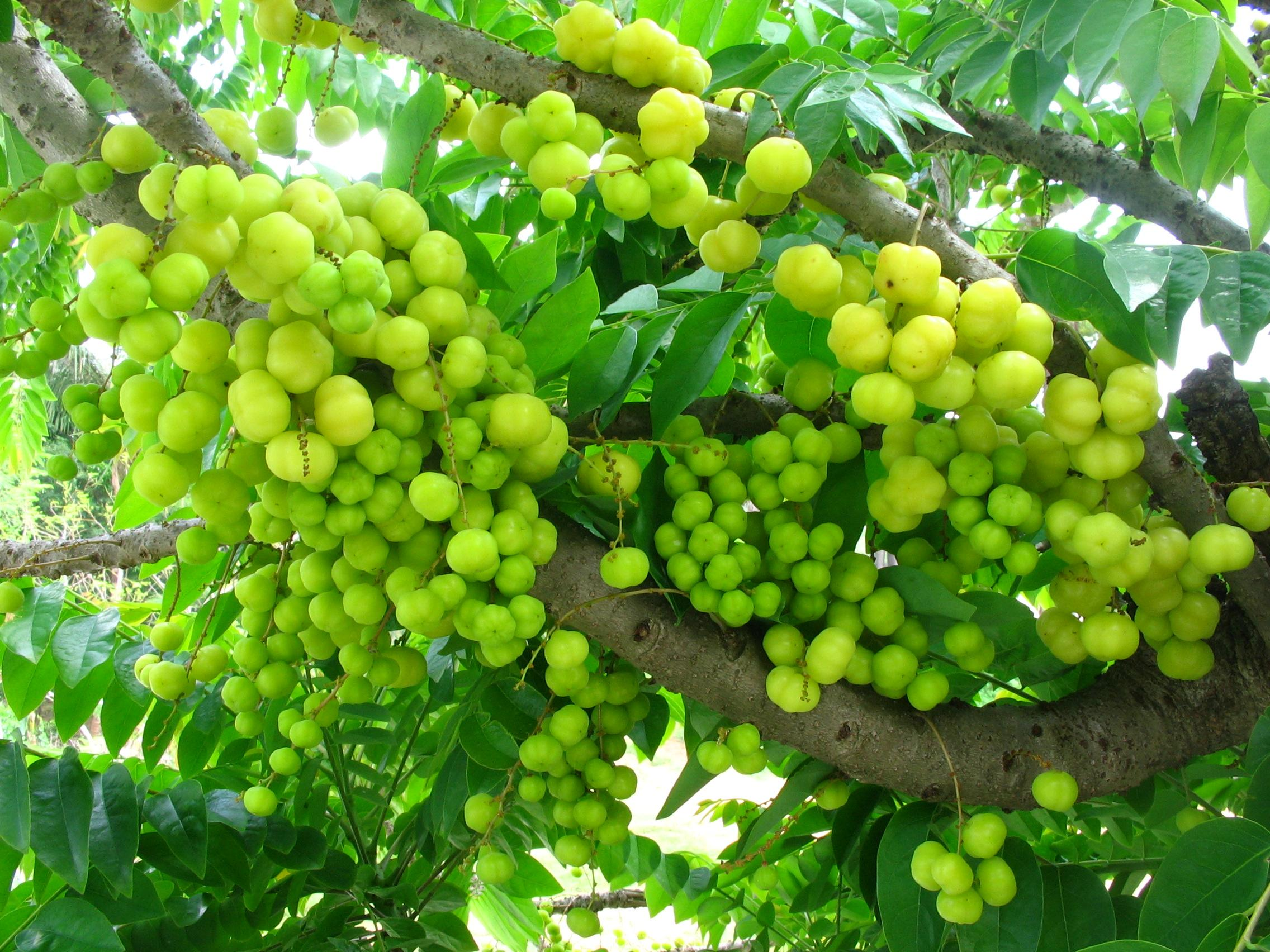
Phyllanthus acidus plant with fruit

In the past, the genera Centroplacus, Paradrypetes, and Phyllanoa had been placed in Phyllanthaceae, but these are now excluded from the family. Centroplacus is now in the family Centroplacaceae. Paradrypetes is in Rhizophoraceae. Phyllanoa is known only from a single specimen. In 1996, this was examined and found to be a species of Rinorea (Violaceae).

The family Phyllanthaceae is divided into two subfamilies: Antidesmatoideae and Phyllanthoideae. Antidesmatoideae is divided into six tribes and Phyllanthoideae is divided into four. The tribe Antidesmateae of Antidesmatoideae, and the tribes Bridelieae and Wielandieae of Phyllanthoideae are further divided into subtribes. The following classification table is from the 2006 revision of Phyllanthaceae.

Incertae sedis: Chonocentrum

Subfamily Antidesmatoideae 6 tribes

Tribe Bischofieae 1 genus

Bischofia

Tribe Uapaceae 1 genus

Uapaca

Tribe Spondiantheae 1 genus

Spondianthus

Tribe Scepeae 8 genera

Aporosa
Ashtonia
Baccaurea
Distichirhops
Maesobotrya
Nothobaccaurea
Protomegabaria
Richeria

Tribe Jablonskieae 2 genera

Jablonskia
Celianella

Tribe Antidesmateae 5 subtribes

Subtribe Hieronyminae 1 genus

Hieronyma

Subtribe Leptonematinae 1 genus

Leptonema

Subtribe Martretiinae 2 genera

Martretia
Apodiscus

Subtribe Hymenocardiinae 2 genera

Hymenocardia
Didymocistus

Subtribe Antidesmatinae 2 genera

Antidesma
Thecacoris

Subfamily Phyllanthoideae 4 tribes

Tribe Bridelieae 5 subtribes

Subtribe Securineginae 2 genera

Securinega
Lachnostylis

Subtribe Saviinae 5 genera

Savia
Croizatia
Discocarpus
Gonatogyne
Tacarcuna

Subtribe Pseudolachnostylidinae 4 genera

Pseudolachnostylis
Bridelia
Cleistanthus
Pentabrachion

Subtribe Keayodendrinae 1 genus

Keayodendron

Subtribe Amanoinae 1 genus

Amanoa

Tribe Phyllantheae 5 genera

Phyllanthus (including Breynia, Glochidion, Reverchonia, and Sauropus)
Flueggea
Lingelsheimia
Margaritaria
Plagiocladus

Tribe Wielandieae 2 subtribes

Subtribe Astrocasiinae 3 genera

Astrocasia
Chascotheca
Heywoodia

Subtribe Wielandiinae 3 genera

Wielandia
Chorisandrachne
Dicoelia

Tribe Poranthereae 8 genera

Poranthera
Actephila
Andrachne
Leptopus
Meineckia
Oreoporanthera
Zimmermannia
Zimmermanniopsis

==== Genera ====
As of January 2026, Plants of the World Online accepted 58 genera.

A 2006 revision of Phyllanthaceae by Petra Hoffmann and co-authors recognized 54 genera. In their treatment, Blotia and Petalodiscus were sunk into Wielandia and Richeriella into Flueggea. Breynia, Glochidion, Reverchonia, and Sauropus were recommended to be subsumed into Phyllanthus, but many new species combinations must be published to effect this change. Genera previously considered as the tribe Drypeteae are now placed in the separate family Putranjivaceae. Plants of the World Online still accepts Breynia and Glochidion, and subsumes Sauropus into Breynia.

- Actephila Blume
- Amanoa Aubl.
- Andrachne L.
- Antidesma L.
- Apodiscus Hutch.
- Aporosa Blume
- Ashtonia Airy Shaw
- Astrocasia B.L.Rob. & Milsp.
- Baccaurea Lour.
- Bischofia Blume
- Breynia J.R.Forst. & G.Forst.
- Bridelia Willd.
- Celianella Jabl.
- Chascotheca Urb.
- Chonocentrum Pierre ex Pax & K.Hoffm.
- Chorisandrachne Airy Shaw
- Cleistanthus Hook.f. ex Planch.
- Croizatia Steyerm.
- Dicoelia Benth.
- Didymocistus Kuhlm.
- Discocarpus Klotzsch
- Distichirhops Haegens
- Flueggea Willd.
- Glochidion J.R.Forst. & G.Forst.
- Gonatogyne Klotsch ex Müll.Arg.
- Heterosavia (Urb.) Petra Hoffm.
- Heywoodia Sim
- Hieronyma Allemão
- Hymenocardia Wall. ex Lindl.
- Jablonskia G.L.Webster
- Keayodendron Leandri
- Lachnostylis Turcz.
- Leptonema A.Juss.
- Leptopus Decne.
- Lingelsheimia Pax
- Maesobotrya Benth.
- Margaritaria L.f.
- Martretia Beille
- Meineckia Baill.
- Nothobaccaurea Haegens
- Notoleptopus Voronts. & Petra Hoffm.
- Pentabrachion Müll.Arg.
- Phyllanthopsis (Scheele) Voronts. & Petra Hoffm.
- Phyllanthus L.
- Plagiocladus J.F.Brunel
- Poranthera Rudge
- Protomegabaria Hutch.
- Pseudolachnostylis Pax
- Pseudophyllanthus (Müll.Arg.) Voronts. & Petra Hoffm.
- Richeria Vahl
- Savia Willd.
- Securinega Comm. ex A.Juss.
- Spondianthus Engl.
- Synostemon F.Muell.
- Tacarcuna Huft
- Thecacoris A.Juss.
- Uapaca Baill.
- Wielandia Baill.

=== Phylogeny ===
The revision of Phyllanthaceae by Hoffmann and co-authors was based on two molecular phylogenetic studies that were published in 2005. Since the revision, phylogenetic studies have been done on some of the tribes.

The phylogenetic tree shown below is based on the results of several studies. Fifty-one genera are represented. Chonocentrum (Phyllanthaceae, incertae sedis), and three members of the tribe Scepeae (Ashtonia, Distichirrhops, and Nothobaccaurea) have not yet been sampled for DNA. Chonocentrum is known from only a single specimen collected in the 1850s.

In the phylogeny shown below, statistical support for the clades was measured by bootstrap percentage. All branches shown below have maximum parsimony bootstrap support of at least 70%.

- Antidesmatoideae
  - Bischofieae
    Bischofia
  - - Uapaceae
      Uapaca
    - Spondiantheae
      Spondianthus
    - Scepeae
      - Protomagabaria
      - - Richeria
        - - Aporosa
          - - Maesobotrya
            - Baccaurea
    - Jablonskieae
      - Jablonskia
      - Celianella
    - Antidesmateae
      - Hieronyma
      - Leptonema
      - - Martretia
        - Apodiscus
      - - Hymenocardia
        - Didymocistus
      - - Thecacoris
        - Antidesma
- Phyllanthoideae
  - Bridelieae
    - - Securinega
      - Lachnostylis
    - - - - Gonatogyne
          - Savia
        - - Tacarcuna
          - Discocarpus
          - Croizatia
      - - Cleistanthus
        - Pseudolachnostylis
        - Pentabrachion
        - Bridelia
      - Keayodendron
      - Amanoa
  - Phyllantheae
    - Plagiocladus
    - Margaritaria
    - - Lingelsheimia
      - - - Heterosavia
          - Flueggea
        - Phyllanthus
  - Wielandieae
    - - Heywoodia
      - - Chascotheca
        - Astrocasia
    - - Wielandia
      - - Dicoelia
        - Chorisandrachne
  - Poranthereae
    - Andrachne
    - Meineckia
    - - Notoleptopus
      - - Pseudophyllanthus
        - Poranthera
    - - Phyllanthopsis
      - - Actephila
        - Leptopus
