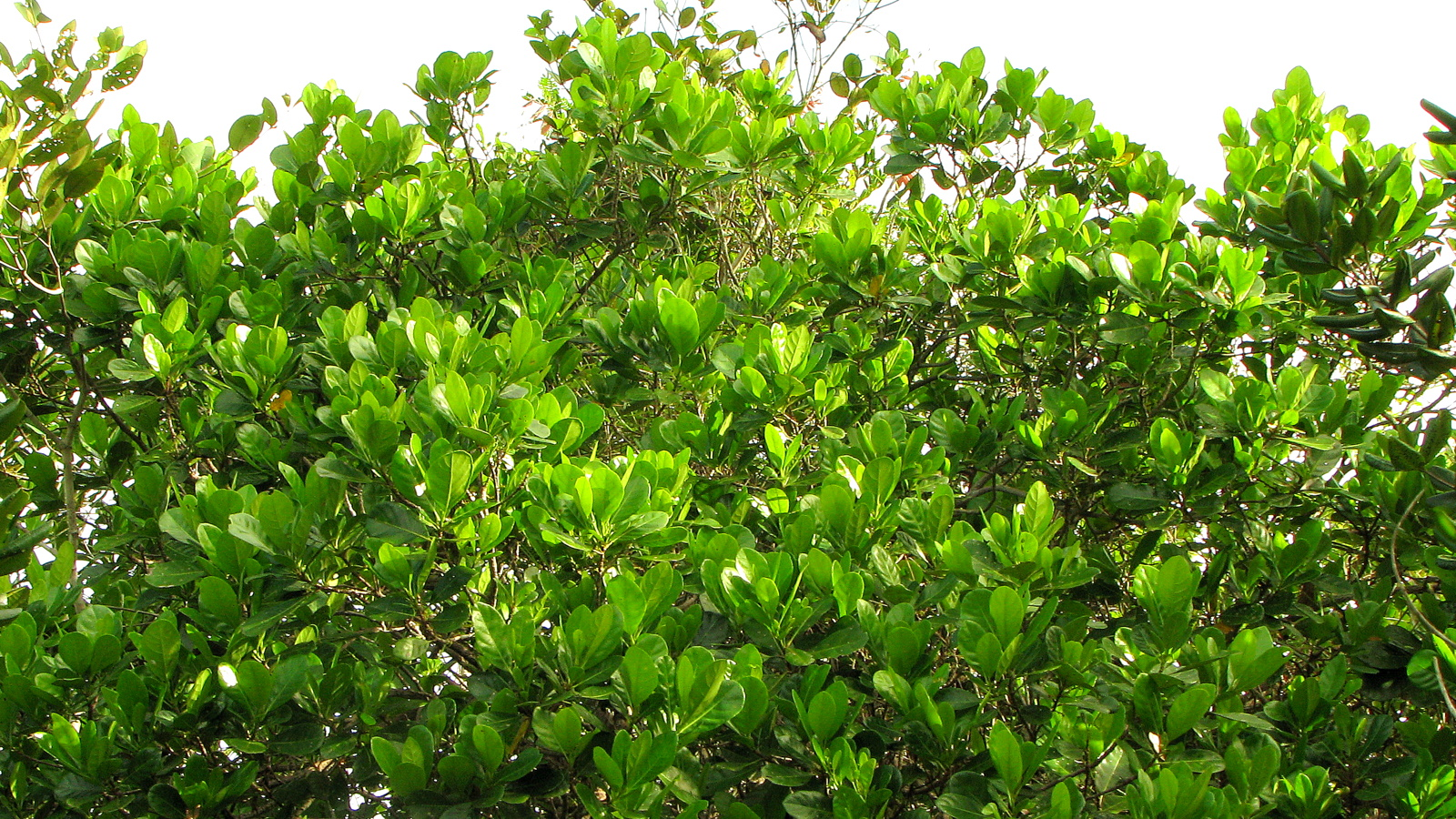

Scientific classification
- Kingdom: Plantae
- Clade: Tracheophytes
- Clade: Angiosperms
- Clade: Eudicots
- Clade: Rosids
- Order: Malpighiales
- Family: Phyllanthaceae
- Genus: Richeria
- Species: R. grandis

Binomial name
- Richeria grandis Vahl

= Richeria grandis =

Species of tree

Richeria grandis is a tree species in the family Phyllanthaceae which ranges from the Lesser Antilles to South America. The species is reputed to have aphrodisiac properties.

== Description ==
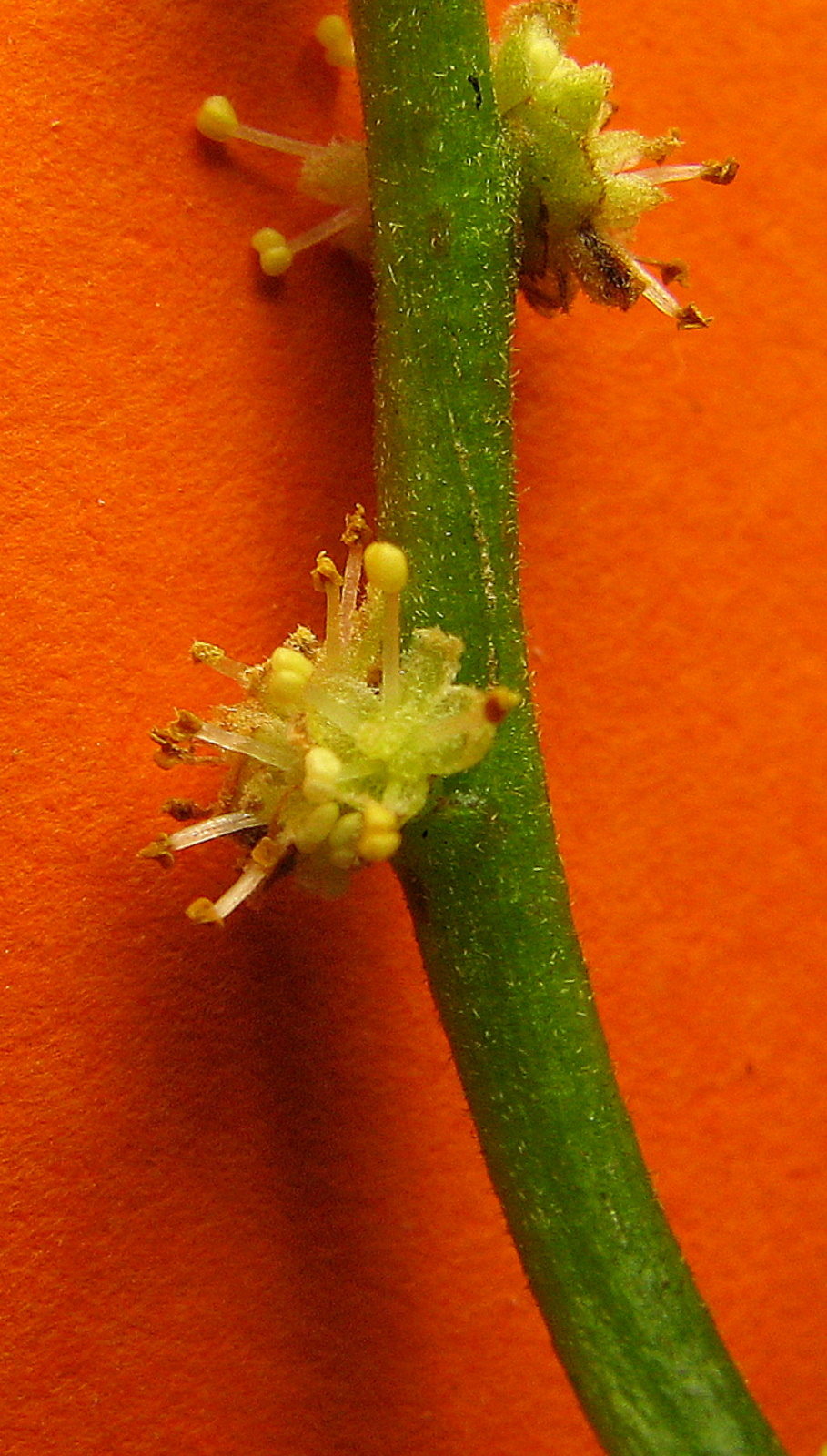
Staminate (male) flowers of Richeria grandis.

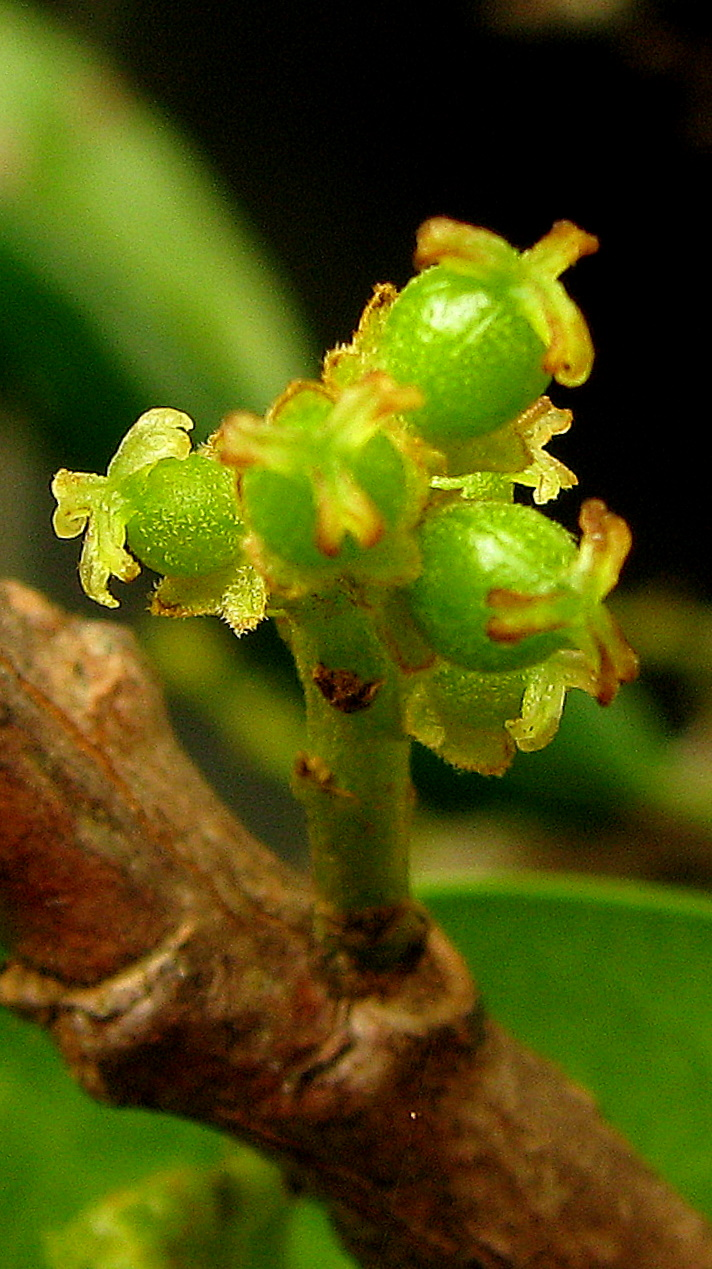
Pistillate (female) flowers of Richeria grandis.

Richeria grandis is a large, evergreen tree with brown bark and a brownish-orange inner bark. It has simple, alternate leaves with an entire margin. The leaves are large, generally 10–20 centimetres (4–8 in) long up to 30 centimetres (12 in) long and 13 centimetres (5 in) wide. The species is dioecious—male and female flowers are borne on separate plants. The male inflorescences are 3–10 centimetres (1–4 in) long with 3-7 flowers; the female inflorescences are 3–5 centimetres (1–2 in) long. The fruit is a capsule, about 1 centimetre (0.4 in) long.

== Taxonomy ==
The species was first described by Martin Vahl in 1797. The species was placed in the Euphorbiaceae, but that family was split up after molecular work showed that the family was polyphyletic. Richeria was moved into a new family, the Phyllanthaceae, when the subfamily Phyllanthoideae was elevated as a result of this split in the Euphorbiaceae.

== Ecology ==
Richeria grandis is a common species in montane forests in parts of the Caribbean and South America. Ariel Lugo and colleagues reported that the species suffered higher levels of damage than most trees after Hurricane David hit the island of Dominica in 1979. The species is an aluminium accumulator, and is capable of accumulating as much as 15,000 ppm of aluminium in its leaves. The plant was able to tolerate the potentially toxic levels of aluminium primarily by depositing the metal in the cell walls of its leaves.

The polypore Porogramme richeriae was described based on collections from the trunk of R. grandis in Guadeloupe.

== Uses ==
Richeria grandis is one of several species including Parinari campestris and Roupala montana which known by the common name bois bandé. These species are reputed to have aphrodisiac properties.
