= Keayodendron =

Conservation status
- Least Concern (IUCN 3.1)

Scientific classification
- Kingdom: Plantae
- Clade: Tracheophytes
- Clade: Angiosperms
- Clade: Eudicots
- Clade: Rosids
- Order: Malpighiales
- Family: Phyllanthaceae
- Subfamily: Phyllanthoideae
- Tribe: Bridelieae
- Subtribe: Keayodendrinae
- Genus: Keayodendron; Leandri
- Species: K. bridelioides

Binomial name
- Keayodendron bridelioides (Mildbr. ex Hutch. & Dalz.) Leandri

Synonyms
- Casearia bridelioides Mildbr. ex Hutch. & Dalziel; Casearia bridelioides Gilg ex Engl.; Drypetes sassandraensis Aubrév.

Genus of flowering plants

Keayodendron is a genus of plants in the family Phyllanthaceae first described as a genus in 1959. It contains only one known species, Keayodendron bridelioides, native to tropical western and Central Africa (Ghana, Cote d'Ivoire (Ivory Coast), Nigeria, Cameroon, Gabon, the Republic of the Congo, and the Central African Republic). It is dioecious, with male and female flowers on separate plants.
