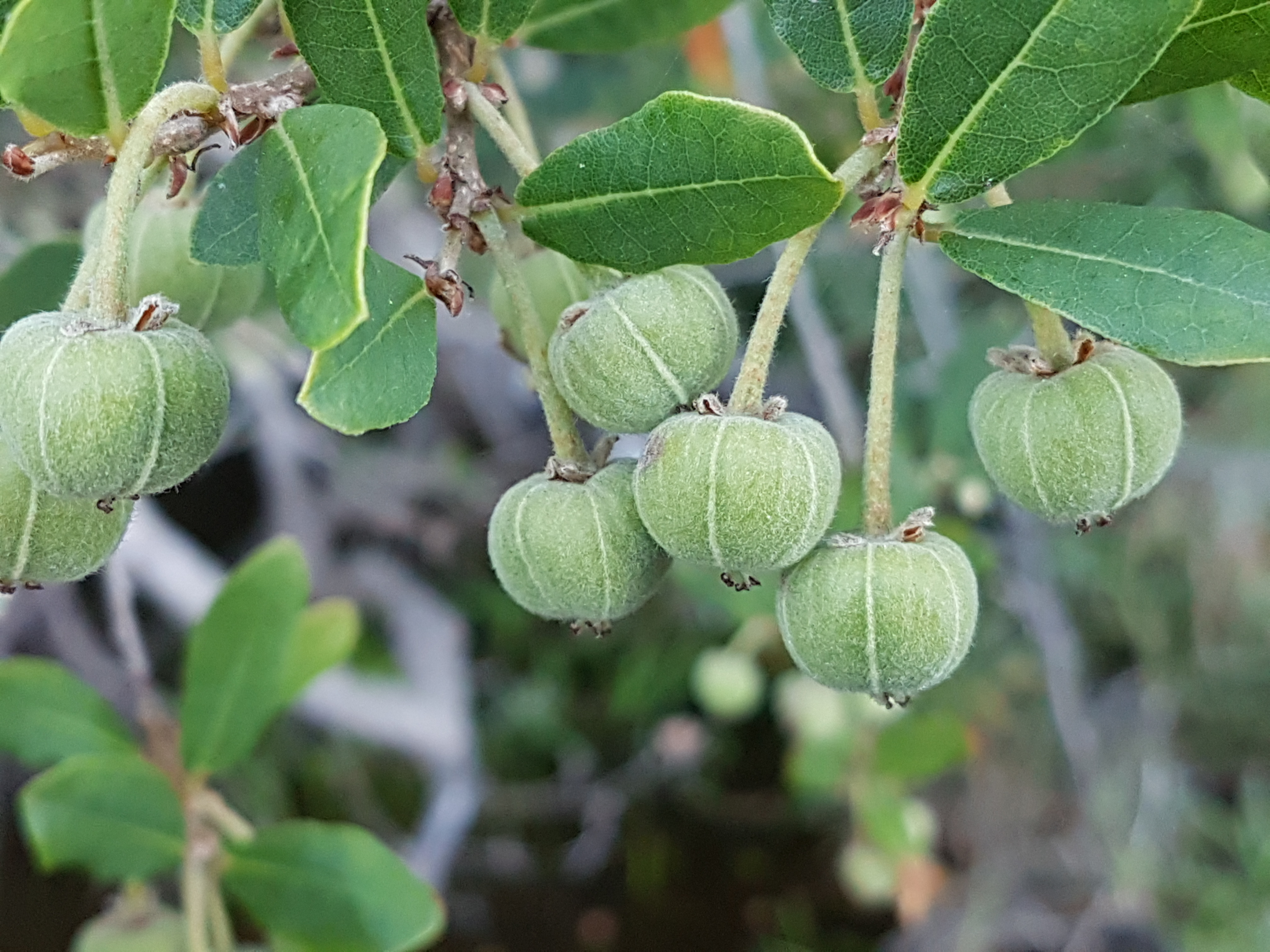
- Lachnostylis hirta

Scientific classification
- Kingdom: Plantae
- Clade: Tracheophytes
- Clade: Angiosperms
- Clade: Eudicots
- Clade: Rosids
- Order: Malpighiales
- Family: Phyllanthaceae
- Subfamily: Phyllanthoideae
- Tribe: Bridelieae
- Subtribe: Securineginae
- Genus: Lachnostylis; Turcz.

= Lachnostylis =

Genus of flowering plants

Lachnostylis is a genus of the family Phyllanthaceae first described as a genus in 1846. It is native to the Eastern Cape and the Western Cape Provinces of South Africa. It is often included in Savia. It is dioecious, with male and female flowers on separate plants.

Species

1. Lachnostylis bilocularis R.A.Dyer
2. Lachnostylis hirta (L.f.) Müll.Arg.
