= Chonocentrum =

Conservation status
- Data Deficient (IUCN 3.1)

Scientific classification
- Kingdom: Plantae
- Clade: Tracheophytes
- Clade: Angiosperms
- Clade: Eudicots
- Clade: Rosids
- Order: Malpighiales
- Family: Phyllanthaceae
- Genus: Chonocentrum; Pierre ex Pax & K.Hoffm.
- Species: C. cyathophorum

Binomial name
- Chonocentrum cyathophorum (Müll.Arg.) Pierre ex Pax & K.Hoffm.

Synonyms
- Drypetes cyathophora Müll.Arg.

Genus of flowering plants

Chonocentrum is a genus of the family Phyllanthaceae described as a genus in 1922. It contains only known species, Chonocentrum cyathophorum, native to the State of Amazonas in northwestern Brazil.

The genus is still not well understood; W. John Hayden has observed that the plant seems have been collected just once, in upper Rio Negro of Brazil in the 1850s, and suggests that it has been misplaced taxonomically.
