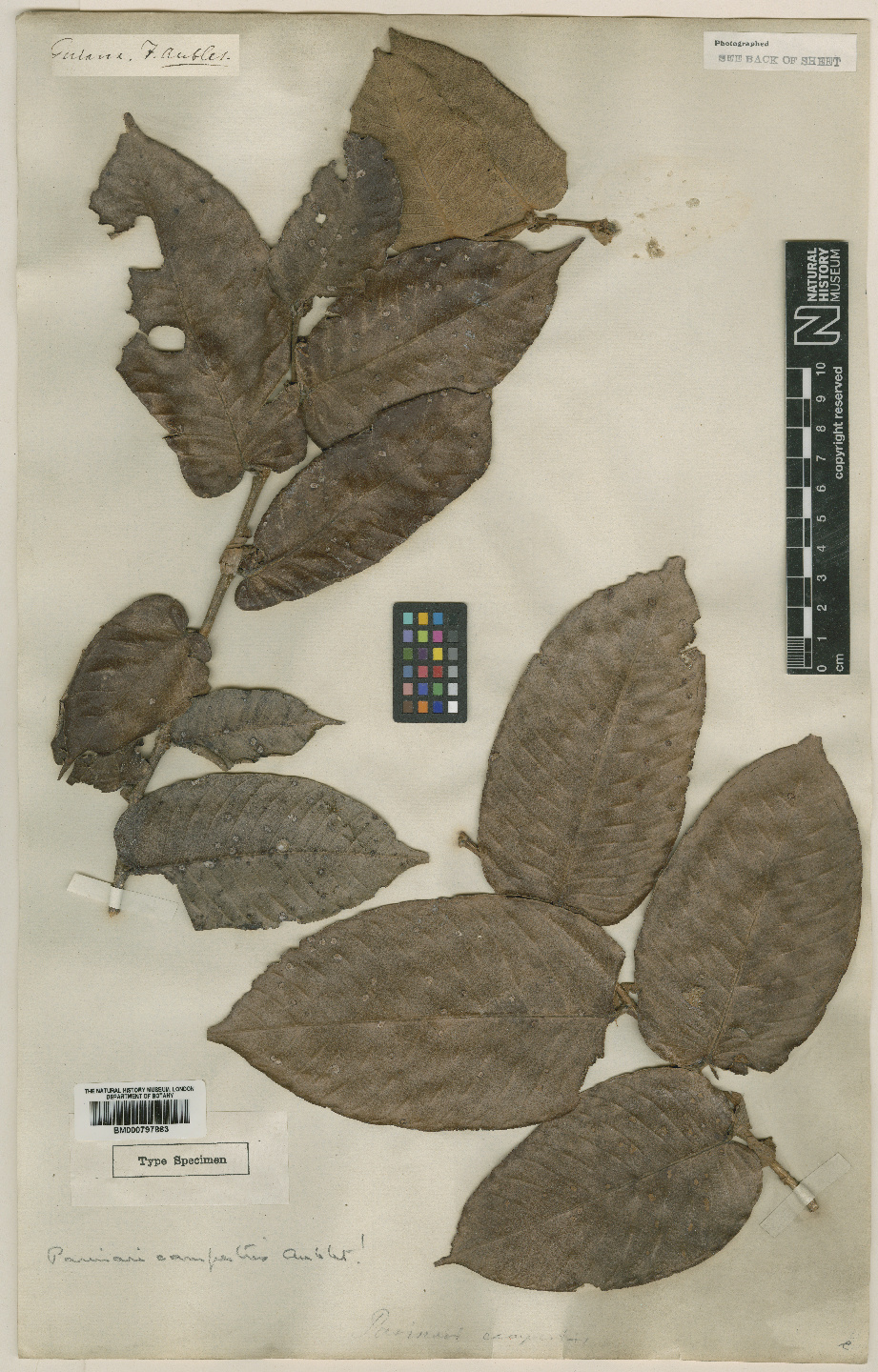
- Parinari campestris Aubl

Scientific classification
- Kingdom: Plantae
- Clade: Tracheophytes
- Clade: Angiosperms
- Clade: Eudicots
- Clade: Rosids
- Order: Malpighiales
- Family: Chrysobalanaceae
- Genus: Parinari
- Species: P. campestris

Binomial name
- Parinari campestris Aubl.

= Parinari campestris =

Species of plant

Parinari campestris is a species of tree in the plant family Chrysobalanaceae which is native to Trinidad, the Guianas, Venezuela and Brazil. It is reputed to have aphrodisiac properties.

== Description ==
The species is a tree which grows up to 25 metres (82 ft) tall. Young branches are hairy but they become hairless as the tree ages. The leaves, which are 6–13 centimetres (2.4–5.1 in) long and 3–6.5 centimetres (1.2–2.6 in) wide, are smooth and shiny on their upper surfaces. The lower surface of the leaves is hairy with prominently raised veins. The stipules are broad at the base but narrowing to a point; they are about 3 centimetres (1.2 in) long. The flowers are hermaphroditic with five white petals, seven stamens and seven or eight staminodes. The fruit is a fleshy drupe, 4–6 centimetres (1.6–2.4 in) long and 2–3 centimetres (0.79–1.18 in) wide.

== Taxonomy ==
The species was described by Jean Baptiste Christophore Fusée Aublet is 1775, together with P. montana. In his 1972 monograph, Ghillean Prance designated P. campestris as the type species of the genus due to the fact that Aublet's illustration of P. montana contains errors and includes parts of plants belonging to two different species of Parinari. In 1789 Antoine Laurent de Jussieu latinised Aublet's name for the genus to Parinarium; although incorrect by current rules of taxonomy, Jussieu's version of the name was widely used over the next two centuries.

== Distribution ==
Parinari campestris grows in open forests, nears the edges of savannas, and along river banks. It ranges from Trinidad in the north, through parts of Venezuela, Guyana, Suriname and French Guiana into northern Brazil.

== Uses ==
Parinari campestris is one of several species including Richeria grandis and Roupala montana which known by the common name bois bandé. These species are reputed to have aphrodisiac properties. The species is also used ritually in winti, an Afro-Surinamese religion.

Extracts from P. campestris leaves have been shown to inhibit the interaction between Vascular endothelial growth factor A and Vascular endothelial growth factor receptor 1.
