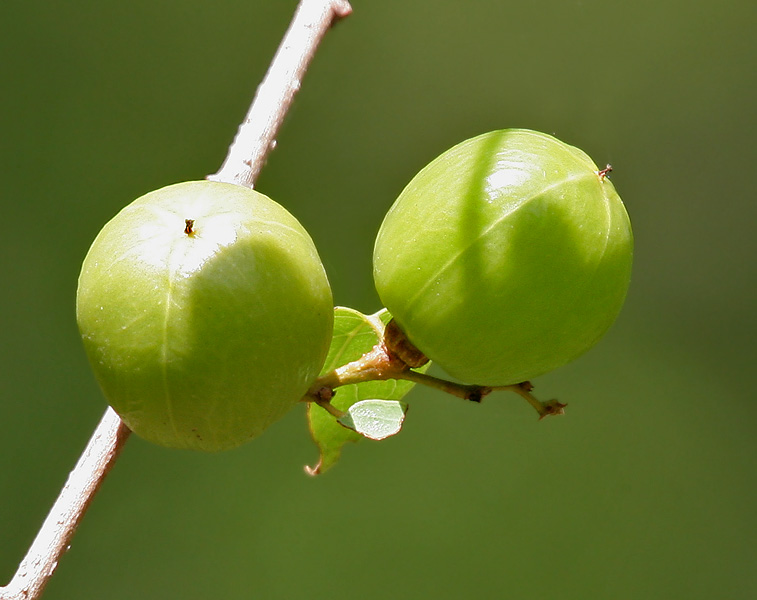
- Cleistanthus collinus in Narsapur, Medak district, India.

Scientific classification
- Kingdom: Plantae
- Clade: Tracheophytes
- Clade: Angiosperms
- Clade: Eudicots
- Clade: Rosids
- Order: Malpighiales
- Family: Phyllanthaceae
- Subfamily: Phyllanthoideae
- Tribe: Bridelieae; Müll.Arg.

= Bridelieae =

Bridelieae Temporal range: Early Paleocene - recent

Tribe of flowering plants

Bridelieae is a tribe of the family Phyllanthaceae.

== Subtribes and genera ==
It comprises 5 subtribes:

Amanoinae

- Amanoa

Keayodendrinae

- Keayodendron

=== Pseudolachnostylidinae ===
- Bridelia (also Candelabria, Gentilia, Pentameria, Tzellemtinia)
- Cleistanthus (also Clistanthus, Godefroya, Kaluhaburunghos, Lebidiera, Lebidieropsis, Leiopyxis, Nanopetalum, Neogoetzia, Paracleisthus, Schistostigma, Stenonia, Stenoniella, Zenkerodendron)
- Pentabrachion
- Pseudolachnostylis

=== Saviinae ===
- Croizatia
- Discocarpus
- Gonatogyne
- Savia
- Tacarcuna

=== Securineginae ===
- Securinega
- Lachnostylis

== See also ==
- Taxonomy of the Phyllanthaceae
