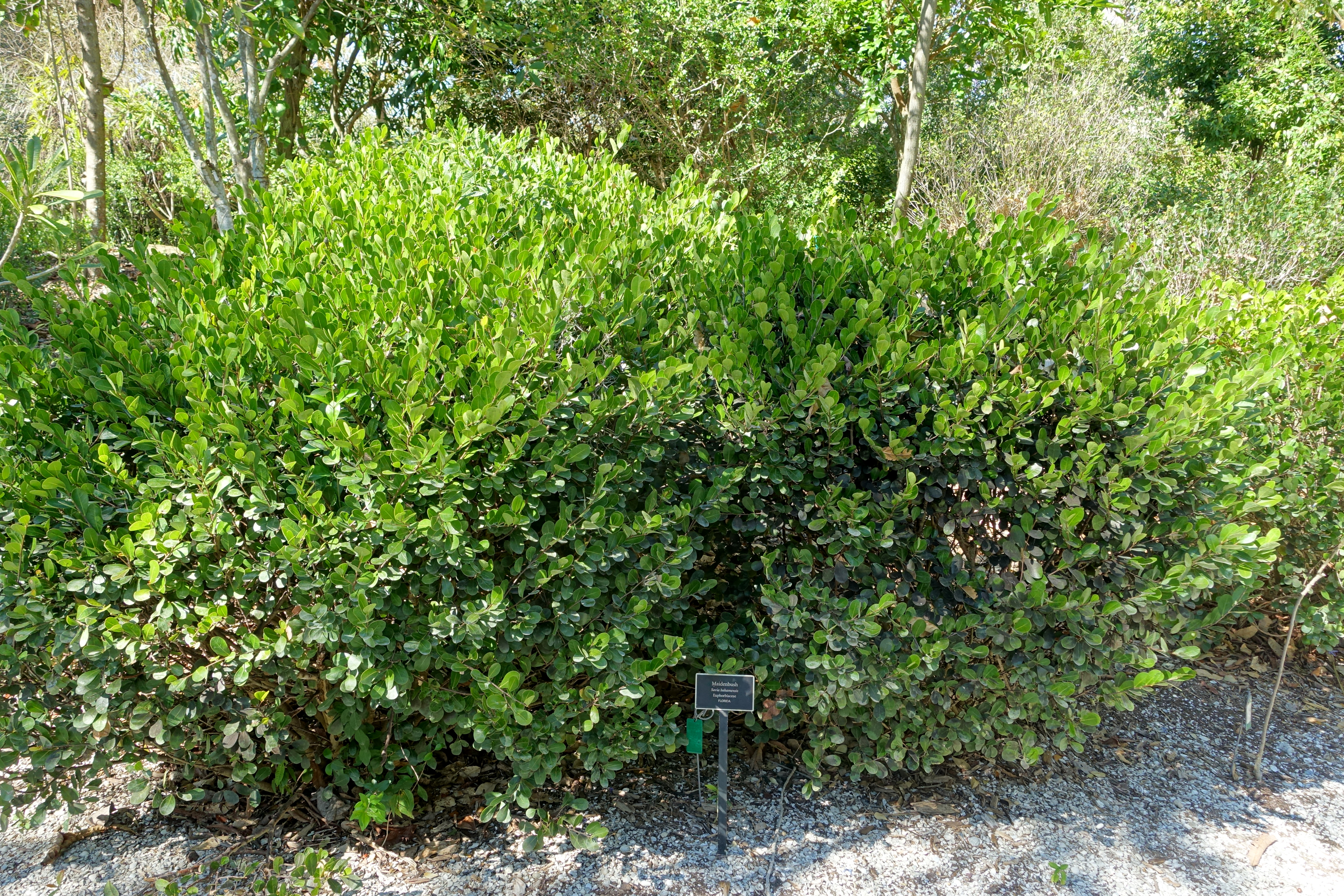
- Heterosavia bahamensis

Scientific classification
- Kingdom: Plantae
- Clade: Tracheophytes
- Clade: Angiosperms
- Clade: Eudicots
- Clade: Rosids
- Order: Malpighiales
- Family: Phyllanthaceae
- Genus: Heterosavia (Urb.) Petra Hoffm. (2008)

Synonyms
- Savia sect. Heterosavia Urb.

= Heterosavia =

Genus of flowering plants

Heterosavia is a genus of the family of Phyllanthaceae first described as a genus in 2008. It is native to the Caribbean and southern Florida. It is found in Bahamas, Cayman Islands, Cuba, Dominican Republic, Florida, Haiti, Jamaica, southwest Caribbean and Turks-Caicos Islands.

The genus was circumscribed by Ignaz Urban and Petra Hoffmann in Brittonia vol.60 on page 152 in 2008.

The genus name of Heterosavia is in honour of Gaetano Savi (1769–1844), who was an Italian naturalist, botanist and mycologist.

== Species ==
As accepted by Plants of the World Online;

1. Heterosavia bahamensis (Britton) Petra Hoffm. - Monroe County in Florida, Bahamas, Cuba, Jamaica, Cayman Islands, Turks & Caicos, islands of southwest Caribbean
2. Heterosavia erythroxyloides (Griseb.) Petra Hoffm. - Cuba, Hispaniola
3. Heterosavia laurifolia (Griseb.) Petra Hoffm. - Cuba
4. Heterosavia maculata (Urb.) Petra Hoffm. - Cuba
