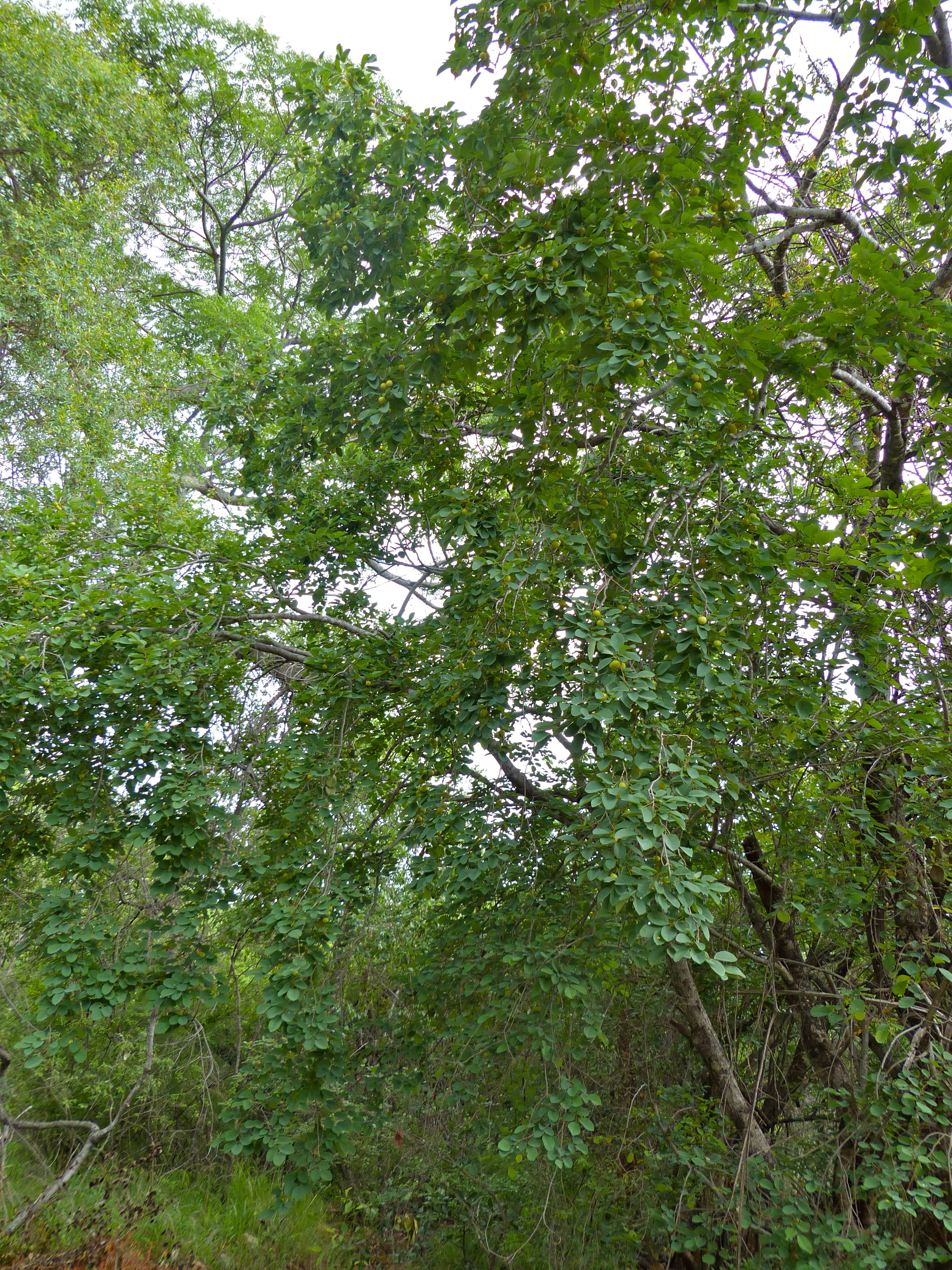

Scientific classification
- Kingdom: Plantae
- Clade: Tracheophytes
- Clade: Angiosperms
- Clade: Eudicots
- Clade: Rosids
- Order: Malpighiales
- Family: Phyllanthaceae
- Subfamily: Phyllanthoideae
- Tribe: Bridelieae
- Subtribe: Pseudolachnostylidinae
- Genus: Pseudolachnostylis; Pax
- Species: P. maprouneifolia

Binomial name
- Pseudolachnostylis maprouneifolia Pax

= Pseudolachnostylis =

Genus of flowering plants

Pseudolachnostylis is a genus of plants in the family Phyllanthaceae first described as a genus in 1899. It contains only one known species, Pseudolachnostylis maprouneifolia native to central and southern Africa. Its common name is kudu berry, though the term also applies for Cassine aethiopica. In Zimbabwe it is called mutsonzowa (Shona) or Umqobampunzi (Ndebele).

varieties

four varieties are recognized

1. Pseudolachnostylis maprouneifolia var. dekindtii (Pax) Radcl.-Sm. - Katanga, Tanzania, Angola, Malawi, Mozambique, Zambia, Zimbabwe, Botswana, Namibia, Limpopo, Mpumalanga
2. Pseudolachnostylis maprouneifolia var. glabra (Pax) Brenan - Burundi, Zaire, Tanzania, Angola, Malawi, Mozambique, Zambia, Zimbabwe, Botswana, Namibia, Limpopo, Mpumalanga
3. Pseudolachnostylis maprouneifolia var. maprouneifolia - Katanga, Burundi, Tanzania, Angola, Malawi, Mozambique, Zambia, Zimbabwe, Botswana, Caprivi Strip
4. Pseudolachnostylis maprouneifolia var. polygyna (Pax & K.Hoffm.) Radcl.-Sm. - Tanzania, Zambia, Malawi
