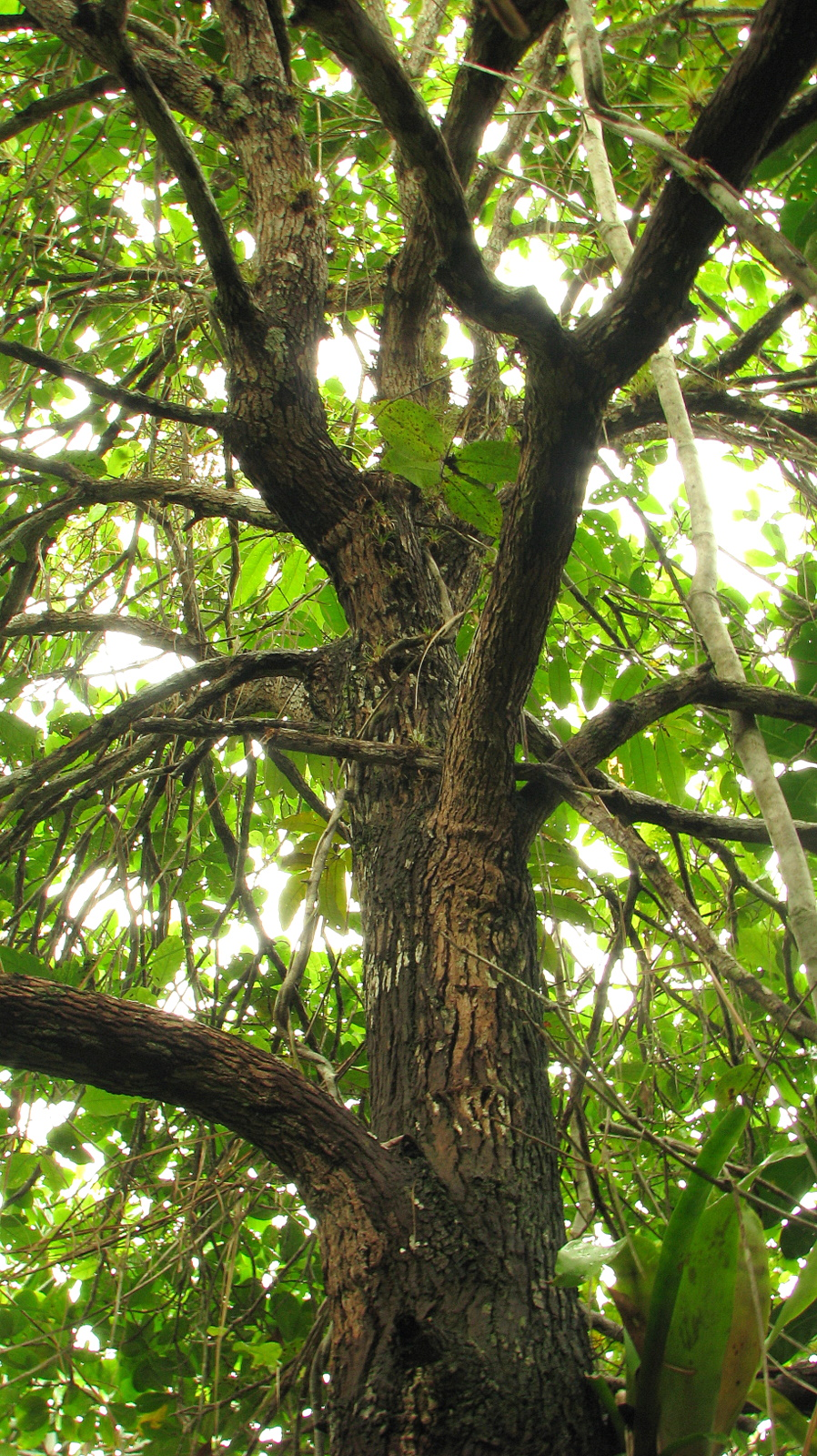
- Richeria grandis

Scientific classification
- Kingdom: Plantae
- Clade: Tracheophytes
- Clade: Angiosperms
- Clade: Eudicots
- Clade: Rosids
- Order: Malpighiales
- Family: Phyllanthaceae
- Subfamily: Antidesmatoideae
- Tribe: Scepeae
- Genus: Richeria; Vahl

Synonyms
- Guarania Wedd. ex Baill.

= Richeria =

Genus of flowering plants

Richeria is a genus of flowering plant belonging to the family Phyllanthaceae first described as a genus in 1797. It is native to Central America, South America, and the West Indies. Richeria is dioecious, with male and female flowers on separate plants.

Species

1. Richeria australis - São Paulo, Mato Grosso
2. Richeria dressleri - Costa Rica, Nicaragua, Panama, Ecuador
3. Richeria grandis - Panama, N South America, E West Indies
4. Richeria obovata - Costa Rica to Bolivia
5. Richeria tomentosa - Colombia, Ecuador

Formerly included

moved to Podocalyx

- Richeria loranthoides - Podocalyx loranthoides
