= Protomegabaria stapfiana =

Conservation status
- Least Concern (IUCN 3.1)

Scientific classification
- Kingdom: Plantae
- Clade: Tracheophytes
- Clade: Angiosperms
- Clade: Eudicots
- Clade: Rosids
- Order: Malpighiales
- Family: Phyllanthaceae
- Genus: Protomegabaria
- Species: P. stapfiana

Binomial name
- Protomegabaria stapfiana (Beille) Hutch.

Synonyms
- Maesobotrya stapfiana Beille; Megabaria klaineana Pierre ex Hutch.; Spondianthus obovatus Engl.

Species of flowering plant

Protomegabaria stapfiana is a species of plant in the family Phyllanthaceae. It is native to western tropical Africa.

== Distribution and habitat ==
Protomegabaria stapfiana can be found in Angola, Cameroon, Democratic Republic of the Congo, Republic of the Congo, Ivory Coast, Equatorial Guinea, Gabon, Ghana, Liberia, Nigeria, São Tomé and Príncipe, and Sierra Leone. It occurs in primary and secondary forests, including both well-drained and freshwater swamp forests, at altitudes of up to 500 m (1,600 ft).

== Description ==
Protomegabaria stapfiana is a shrub to medium-sized tree growing to 15–18 m (49–59 ft) tall and 22 cm (8.7 in) in diameter, sometimes with buttresses. The bark is brown, sometimes with a reddish or greenish tone. Branches are glabrous, though branchlets are usually covered in fine hairs. The leaves are oblong to elliptic, typically measuring 16–28 cm (6.3–11.0 in) by 5–10 cm (2.0–3.9 in), glabrous above, pubescent when young but becoming glabrous with age beneath. The male inflorescence grows to 20 cm (7.9 in), while the female inflorescence is approximately 4 cm (1.6 in) long but may reach up to 15 cm (5.9 in) when fruiting.
