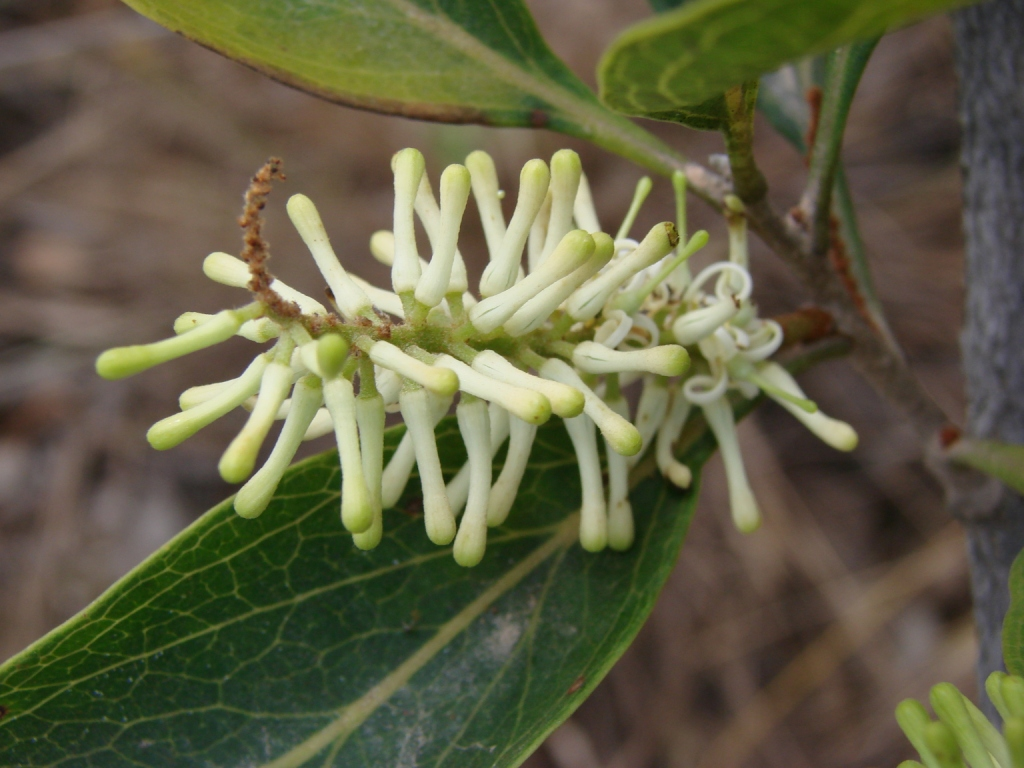

Conservation status
- Least Concern (IUCN 3.1)

Scientific classification
- Kingdom: Plantae
- Clade: Tracheophytes
- Clade: Angiosperms
- Clade: Eudicots
- Order: Proteales
- Family: Proteaceae
- Genus: Roupala
- Species: R. montana

Binomial name
- Roupala montana Aubl.

Synonyms
- Embothrium pinnatum Ruiz & Pavón; Roupala pyrifolia Knight; Roupala diversifolia R.Brown; Roupala media R.Brown; Roupala dentata R.Brown; Roupala complicata Kunth in HBK; Roupala ovalis Pohl; Roupala affinis Pohl; Roupala macropoda Klotzsch & H.Karsten; Roupala brasiliensis Klotzsch var. macropoda Meisner; Roupala gardneri Meisner; Roupala gardneri Meisner var. angustata Meisner; Roupala gardneri Meisner var. dentata Meisner; Roupala gardneri Meisner var. integrifolia Meisner; Roupala glabrata Klotzsch; Roupala martii Meisner; Roupala martii Meisner var. pinnata Meisner; Roupala martii Meisner var. simplicifolia Meisner; Roupala veraguensis Klotszch; Roupala ovalis Klotzsch ex Meisner; Roupala boissieriana Meisner; Roupala tomentosa Pohl var. sellowii Meisner; Roupala montana var. complicata (Kunth) Grisebach; Roupala montana var. heterophylla Grisebach; Roupala borealis Hemsley; Roupala acuminata Glaziou; Roupala darienensis Pittier; Roupala panamensis Pittier; Roupala discolor Rusby; Roupala dissimilis Pittier; Roupala repanda Lundell; Roupala sphenophylla Diels ex Sleumer; Roupala mayana Lundell

= Roupala montana =

Species of plant native to the Neotropics

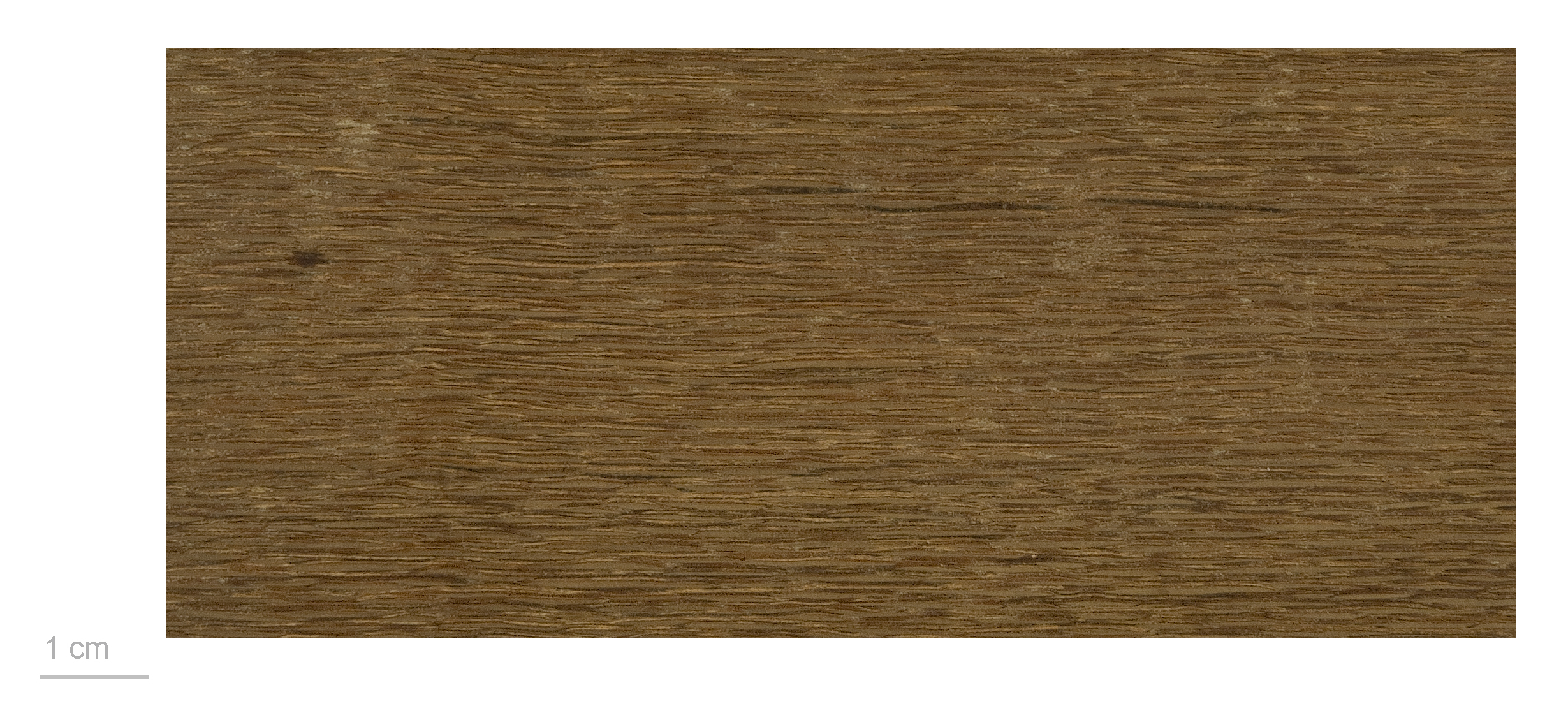
Roupala montana - MHNT

Roupala montana is a species of shrub or tree in the family Proteaceae which is native to much of the Neotropics. It is a morphologically variable species with four recognised varieties. The species is used medicinally in Venezuela, and as an aphrodisiac in Trinidad and Tobago and Venezuela.

== Description ==
The species ranges in size from shrubs to trees, usually 1–8 metres (3–26 ft) tall, but sometimes ranging up to 25 metres (82 ft) tall. The leaves are usually simple in adult plants, but are occasionally compound. It is an ochlospecies—a species that is highly variable morphologically, and that variability "cannot be satisfactorily accommodated within a formal classification"—with a very wide distribution. Consequently, a large number of species and varieties have been described based on variations between collections.

== Taxonomy ==
The species was first described by Jean Baptiste Christophore Fusée Aublet in 1775. The name Roupala was based on roupale, a name used locally in French Guiana. The Latin specific epithet montana refers to mountains or coming from mountains.

In their 2007 monograph, Ghillean Prance, Katie S. Edwards and coauthors recognised four named varieties within the species: R. montana var. montana (the "nominate" variety, based on Aublet's original description of the species), R. montana var. brasiliensis (Klotzsch) K.S.Edwards, R. montana var. impressiuscula (Mez) K.S.Edwards and R. montana var. paraensis (Sleumer) K.S.Edwards.

== Distribution ==
Roupala montana ranges from Mexico in the north, through Central America, to Trinidad and Tobago, and across South America to southern Bolivia, Argentina, Paraguay and southern Brazil.

== Uses ==
The species is used for fuel wood, high quality charcoal, medicinally and to a limited extent for woodworking and construction, The wood is commonly used for wood turning and sold in small spindles and blocks. Specialist exotic wood suppliers typically refer to this timber as Leopardwood but it can be confused with other species such as Lacewood (Panopsis -P. rubescens and P. sessilifolia). The wood shows strong figuring in quartersawn sections. It turns well and gives a good finish.

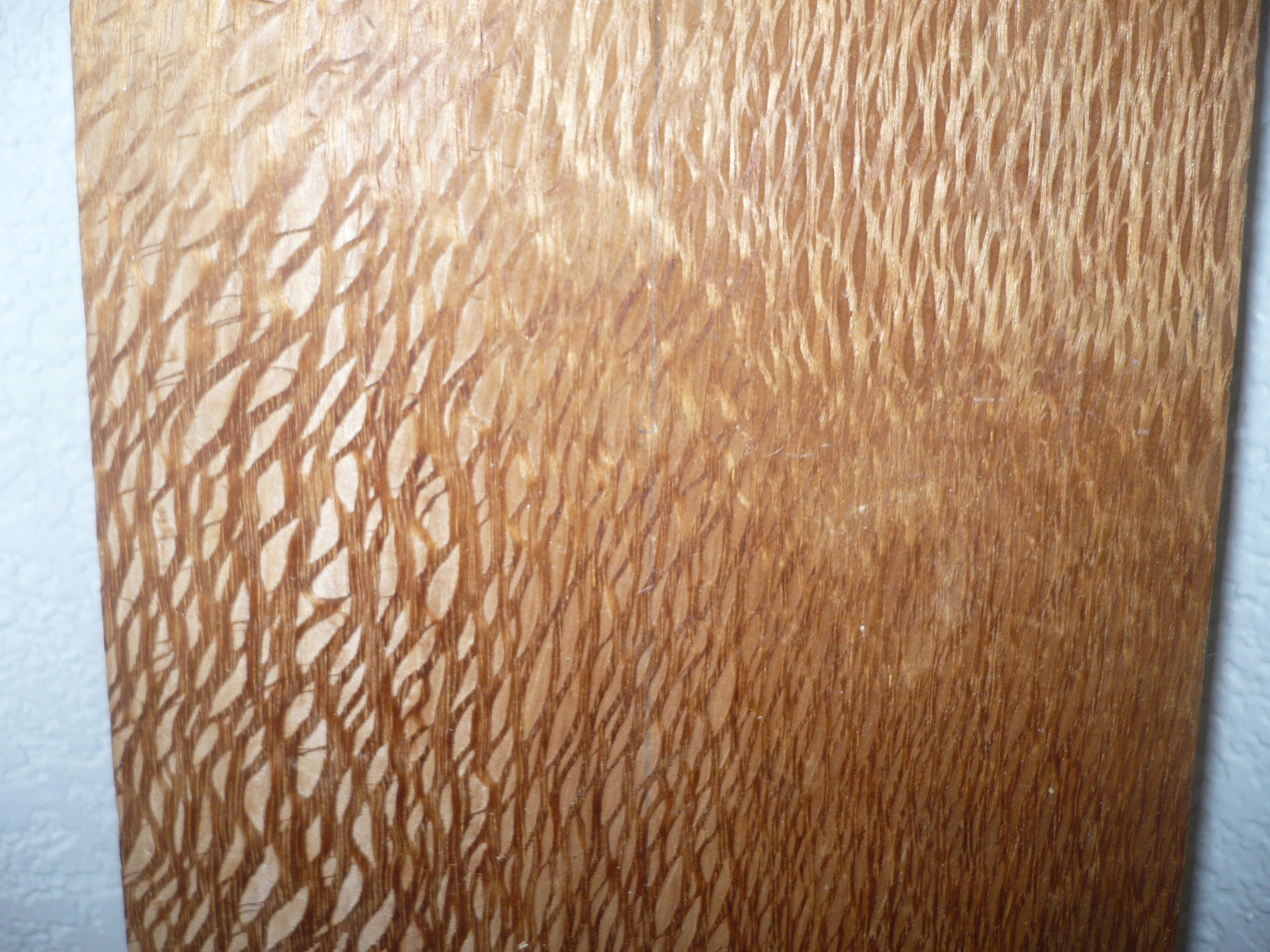
Quartersawn lacewood and leopardwood showing characteristic figuring

It is one of several species including Parinari campestris and Richeria grandis which known by the common name bois bandé. These species are reputed to have aphrodisiac properties.
