= Gonatogyne =

Scientific classification
- Kingdom: Plantae
- Clade: Tracheophytes
- Clade: Angiosperms
- Clade: Eudicots
- Clade: Rosids
- Order: Malpighiales
- Family: Phyllanthaceae
- Subfamily: Phyllanthoideae
- Tribe: Bridelieae
- Subtribe: Saviinae
- Genus: Gonatogyne; Klotzsch ex Müll.Arg.
- Species: G. brasiliensis

Binomial name
- Gonatogyne brasiliensis (Baill.) Müll.Arg.

Synonyms
- Amanoa brasiliensis Baill.; Savia brasiliensis (Baill.) Pax & K.Hoffm.; Gonatogyne lucens Klotzsch ex Baill., name published without description

Genus of flowering plants

Gonatogyne is a genus of plants in the family Phyllanthaceae first described as a genus in 1873. It contains only one known species, Gonatogyne brasiliensis, endemic to southeastern Brazil. It is dioecious, with male and female flowers on separate plants.
