= List of Phyllanthaceae genera =

Below is the full taxonomy of the family Phyllanthaceae. Its circumscription is nearly coincident to that of ex-subfamily Phyllanthoideae of the Euphorbiaceae, where this family was split from. The exceptions are that the ex-tribe Drypeteae has become family Putranjivaceae, and the genus Centroplacus, which previously constituted tribe Centroplaceae, is now part of the Pandaceae.

== Tribe Amanoeae ==
There are 2 genera:

Amanoa (also called Micropetalum)
Pentabrachion

== Tribe Antidesmateae ==
There are 5 subtribes and 19 genera:

Subtribe Antidesminae:

Antidesma (also Bestram, Coulejia, Minutalia, Rhytis, Rubina, Stilago)
Celianella
Hieronyma (also Hieronima, Hyeronima, Stilaginella)
Leptonema
Thecacoris (also Baccaureopsis, Cyathogyne, Henribaillonia)

Subtribe Porantherinae:

Oreoporanthera
Poranthera

Subtribe Scepinae:

Apodiscus
Aporosa (also Aporusa, Leiocarpus, Lepidostachys, Scepa, Tetractinostigma)
Ashtonia
Baccaurea (also Adenocrepis, Calyptroon, Coccomelia, Everettiodendron, Gatnaia, Hedycarpus, Microsepala, Pierardia)
Distichirhops
Jablonskia
Maesobotrya (also Staphysora)
Nothobaccaurea
Protomegabaria
Richeria (also Bellevalia, Guarania)

Subtribe Spondianthinae:

Spondianthus (also Megabaria)

Subtribe Uapacinae:

Uapaca (also Canariastrum)

== Tribe Bischofieae ==
There is only one genus:

Bischofia (also Microelus, Stylodiscus)

== Tribe Bridelieae ==
There are 2 genera:

Bridelia (also Candelabria, Gentilia, Pentameria, Tzellemtinia)
Cleistanthus (also Clistanthus, Godefroya, Kaluhaburunghos, Lebidiera, Lebidieropsis, Leiopyxis, Nanopetalum, Neogoetzia, Paracleisthus, Schistostigma, Stenonia, Stenoniella, Zenkerodendron)

== Tribe Hymenocardieae ==
There are 2 genera:

Didymocistus
Hymenocardia

== Tribe Martretieae ==
There is only one genus:

Martretia

== Tribe Phyllantheae ==
There are 6 subtribes and 18 genera:

Subtribe Andrachinae:

Andrachne (also Eraeliss, Thelypotzium)

Subtribe Astrocasiinae:

Astrocasia

Subtribe Flueggeinae:

Breynia (also Foersteria, Forsteria, Melanthes, Melanthesa, Melanthesopsis)
Flueggea (also Bessera, Colmeiroa, Geblera, Neowawraea, Pleiostemon, Villanova)
Glochidion (also Agyneia, Bradleia, Bradleja, Coccoglochidion, Diasperus, Episteira, Glochidionopsis, Glochisandra, Gynoon, Lobocarpus, Pseudoglochidion, Tetraglochidion, Zarcoa)
Margaritaria (also Calococcus, Prosorus, Wurtzia, Zygospermum)
Phyllanthus (also Anisonema, Aporosella, Arachnodes, Ardinghalia, Asterandra, Cathetus, Ceramanthus, Chorisandra, Cicca, Clambus, Conami, Dendrophyllanthus, Dicholactina, Dimorphocladium, Emblica, Epistylium, Eriococcus, Fluggeopsis, Genesiphylla, Hemicicca, Hemiglochidion, Kirganelia, Leichhardtia, Lomanthes, Maborea, Macraea, Menarda, Mirobalanus, Moeroris, Nellica, Niruri, Nymania, Nymphanthus, Orbicularia, Oxalistylis, Ramsdenia, Reidia, Reverchonia, Rhopium, Roigia, Scepasma, Staurothylax, Synexemia, Tricarium, Uranthera, Urinaria, Williamia, Xylophylla)
Richeriella
Sauropus (also Aalius, Breyniopsis, Ceratogynum, Diplomorpha, Heterocalymnantha, Hexadena, Hexaspermum, Ibina, Synastemon, Synostemon)

Subtribe Leptopinae:

Leptopus (also Arachne, Chorisandrachne, Hexakestra, Hexakistra)

Subtribe Pseudolachnostylidinae:

Chascotheca (also Chaenotheca)
Keayodendron
Meineckia (also Cluytiandra, Neopeltandra, Peltandra)
Pseudolachnostylis
Zimmermannia
Zimmermanniopsis

Subtribe Securineginae:

Securinega

== Tribe Wielandieae ==
It comprises 10 genera:

Actephila (also Anomospermum, Lithoxylon)
Blotia
Chonocentrum
Discocarpus
Gonatogyne
Heywoodia
Lachnostylis
Petalodiscus
Savia (also Charidia, Geminaria, Kleinodendron, Maschalanthus)
Wielandia

== See also ==
- Taxonomy of the Euphorbiaceae
