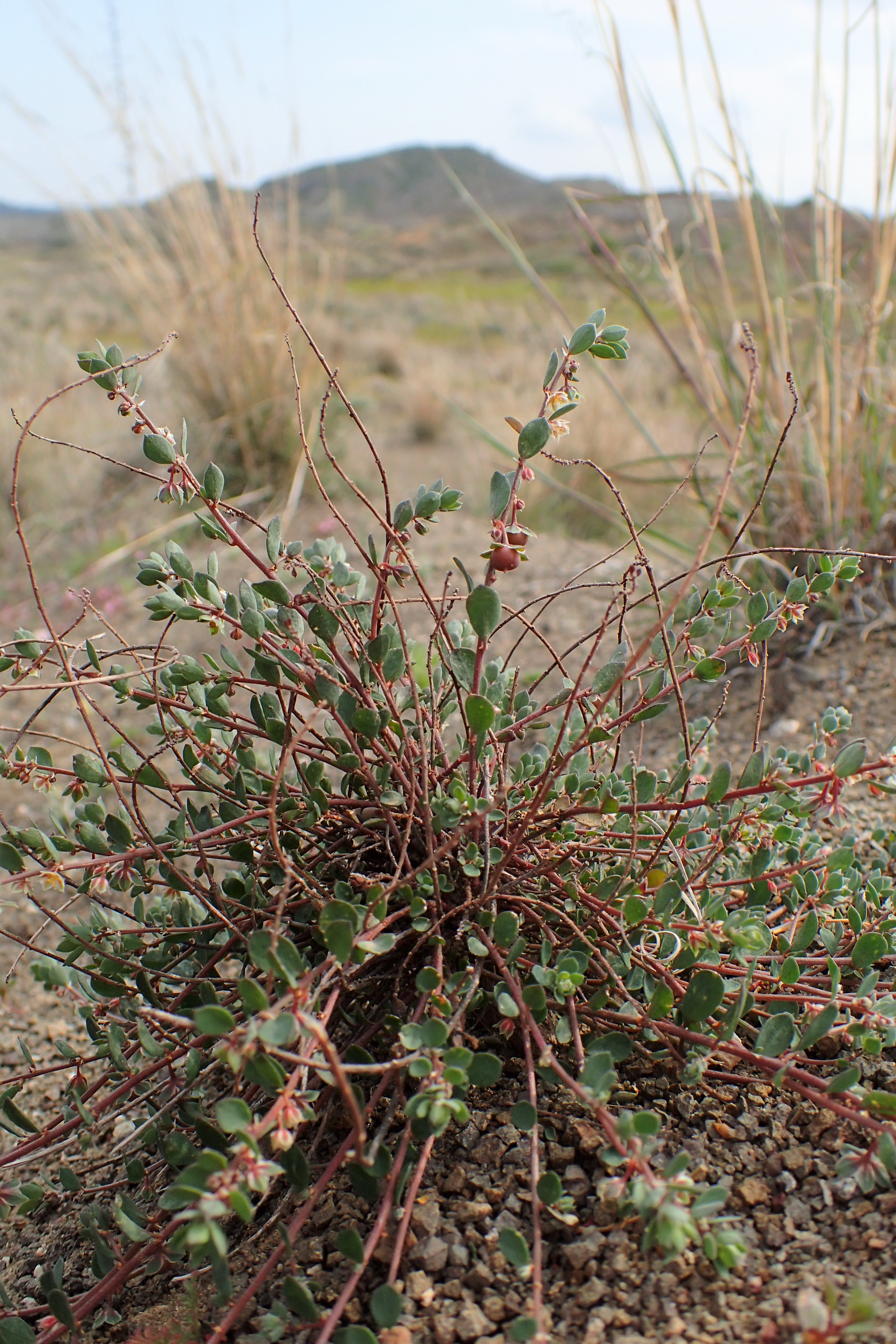
- Andrachne telephioides

Scientific classification
- Kingdom: Plantae
- Clade: Embryophytes
- Clade: Tracheophytes
- Clade: Spermatophytes
- Clade: Angiosperms
- Clade: Eudicots
- Clade: Rosids
- Order: Malpighiales
- Family: Phyllanthaceae
- Subfamily: Phyllanthoideae
- Tribe: Poranthereae
- Genus: Andrachne; L.

Type species
- Andrachne telephioides L.

Synonyms
- Eraclissa Forssk.; Arachne Neck.; Telephioides Tourn. ex Moench; Lepidanthus Nutt. 1837, illegitimate homonym, not Nees 1830 (Restionaceae); Phyllanthidea Didr.

= Andrachne =

Genus of flowering plants in the family Phyllanthaceae

Andrachne is a genus of flowering plants in the family Phyllanthaceae described by Linnaeus in 1753. It is one of eight genera in the tribe Poranthereae.

They are monoecious herbs or subshrubs, native to semideserts and desert margins of the Americas, southern Europe, North Africa, and South Asia. Linnaeus took the name from Theophrastus, but it is not clear to which plant Theophrastus applied the name. Actually, the etymology of the genus name corresponds to the Ancient Greek word ἀνδράχνη (andrákhnē), meaning either "common purslane" (Portulaca oleracea) or "wild strawberry" (Fragaria vesca).

== Systematics ==
=== Species list ===
The Andrachne genus includes the following species.

1. Andrachne afghanica - Afghanistan
2. Andrachne aspera - NW Africa, E Africa + SW Asia from Egypt + Ethiopia to Pakistan
3. Andrachne brittonii - Cuba, Haiti
4. Andrachne buschiana - Transcaucasus
5. Andrachne ephemera - Ethiopia
6. Andrachne fedtschenkoi - Turkmenistan, Tajikistan
7. Andrachne filiformis - Transcaucasus
8. Andrachne fragilis - Somalia
9. Andrachne fruticulosa - SW Iran
10. Andrachne maroccana - Morocco
11. Andrachne merxmuelleri - Iran
12. Andrachne microphylla - Baja California Sur, Sonora, Peru
13. Andrachne minutifolia - N Iran
14. Andrachne pulvinata - N Iran
15. Andrachne pusilla - Tajikistan
16. Andrachne pygmaea - Kyrgyzstan
17. Andrachne ramosa - Iran
18. Andrachne reflexa - Iran
19. Andrachne schweinfurthii - Somalia, Socotra
20. Andrachne stenophylla - S Turkmenistan, N Iran
21. Andrachne telephioides - Mediterranean, E Africa, SW + S + C Asia
22. Andrachne virgatenuis - Tajikistan

=== Formerly included ===
The following species were formerly included in Andrachne before being moved to the other genera Bischofia, Breynia, Bridelia, Cleistanthus, Leptopus, Meineckia, Notoleptopus, Phyllanthus, Phyllanthopsis, Pseudophyllanthus, and Sauropus.

1. A. apetala - Bischofia javanica
2. A. arborea - Phyllanthus grandifolius
3. A. arida - Phyllanthopsis arida
4. A. attenuata - Leptopus clarkei
5. A. australis - Leptopus australis
6. A. bodinieri - Leptopus chinensis
7. A. cadishaco - Cleistanthus collinus
8. A. cadishan - Leptopus chinensis
9. A. calcarea - Leptopus australis
10. A. capensis - Pseudophyllanthus ovalis
11. A. capillipes - Leptopus chinensis
12. A. cavaleriei - Leptopus chinensis
13. A. cerebroides - Meineckia cerebroides
14. A. chinensis - Leptopus chinensis
15. A. clarkei - Leptopus clarkei
16. A. colchica - Leptopus chinensis
17. A. cordifolia - Leptopus cordifolius
18. A. cuneifolia - Phyllanthus cuneifolius
19. A. decaisneana - Leptopus cordifolius
20. A. decaisnei - Notoleptopus decaisnei
21. A. doonkyboisca - Bridelia retusa
22. A. dregeana - Pseudophyllanthus ovalis
23. A. elliptica - Bridelia montana
24. A. emicans - Leptopus emicans
25. A. esquirolii - Leptopus clarkei
26. A. fruticosa L. - Breynia fruticosa
27. A. fruticosa Decne. ex Müll.Arg. - Notoleptopus decaisnei
28. A. fruticosa B.Heyne ex Hook.f. - Meineckia parvifolia
29. A. fruticosa var. orbicularis (Benth.) Pax & K.Hoffm. - Notoleptopus decaisnei
30. A. gracilipes - Meineckia gracilipes
31. A. hainanensis - Leptopus hainanensis
32. A. hirsuta - Leptopus chinensis
33. A. hirta - Leptopus australis
34. A. hypoglauca - Leptopus clarkei
35. A. lanceolata - Leptopus australis
36. A. lolonum - Leptopus chinensis
37. A. montana - Leptopus chinensis
38. A. nana - Leptopus chinensis
39. A. orbicularis - Notoleptopus decaisnei
40. A. orbiculata - Cleistanthus collinus
41. A. ovalis - Pseudophyllanthus ovalis
42. A. ovata - Sauropus androgynus
43. A. pachyphylla - Leptopus pachyphyllus
44. A. persicariifolia - Leptopus clarkei
45. A. phyllanthoides - Phyllanthopsis phyllanthoides
46. A. polypetala - Leptopus australis
47. A. pumila - Phyllanthus caroliniensis
48. A. reverchonii - Phyllanthopsis phyllanthoides
49. A. robinsonii - Leptopus robinsonii
50. A. roemeriana - Phyllanthopsis phyllanthoides
51. A. schaffneriana - Phyllanthus caroliniensis
52. A. tenera - Leptopus australis
53. A. trifoliata - Bischofia javanica
54. A. yunnanensis - Leptopus chinensis
