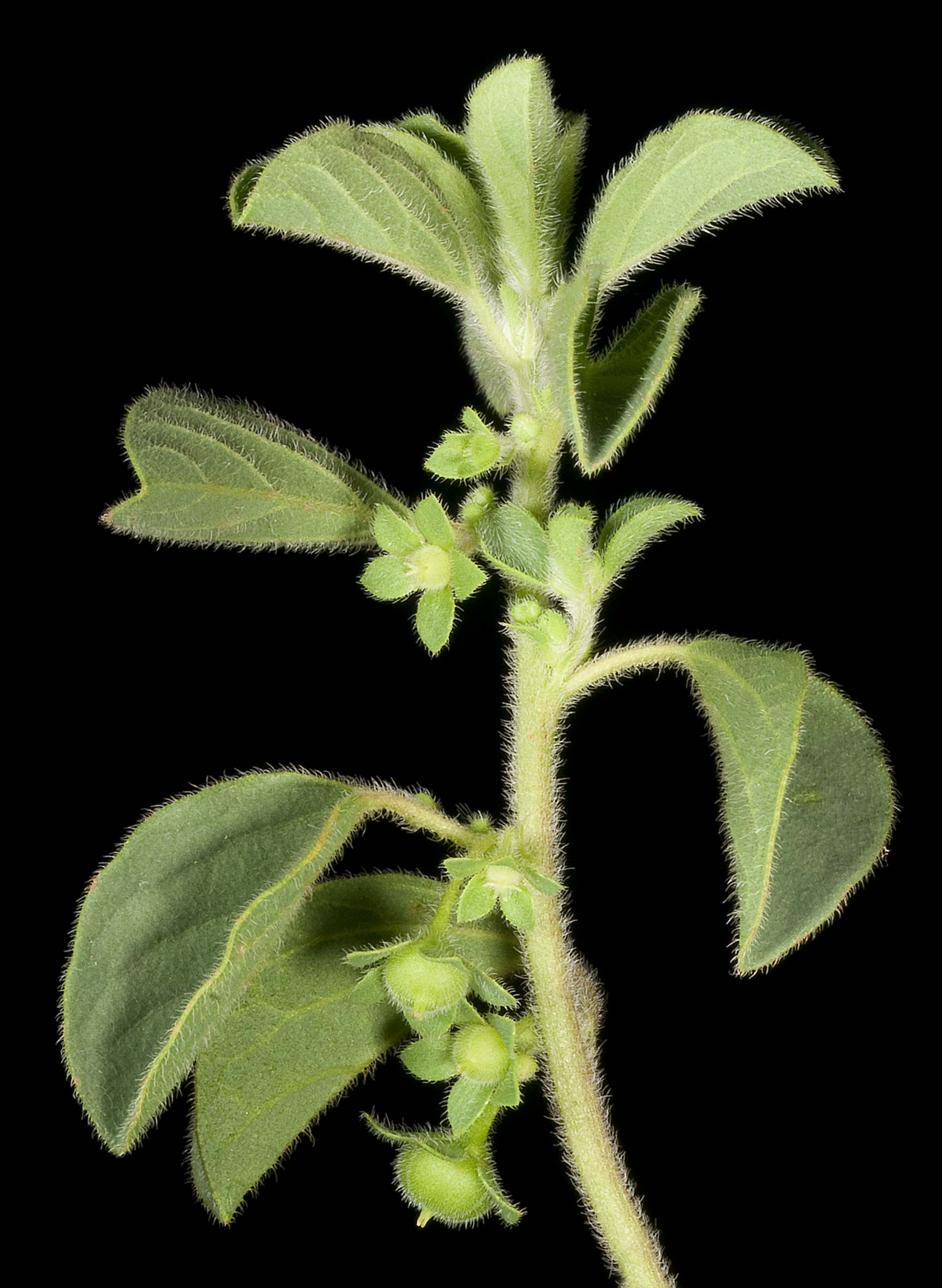

Scientific classification
- Kingdom: Plantae
- Clade: Tracheophytes
- Clade: Angiosperms
- Clade: Eudicots
- Clade: Rosids
- Order: Malpighiales
- Family: Phyllanthaceae
- Subfamily: Phyllanthoideae
- Tribe: Poranthereae
- Genus: Notoleptopus; Voronts. & Petra Hoffm.
- Species: N. decaisnei

Binomial name
- Notoleptopus decaisnei (Benth.) Voronts. & Petra Hoffm.

= Notoleptopus =

Genus of flowering plants

Notoleptopus is a monotypic genus of flowering plants in the family Phyllanthaceae. It is one of eight genera in the tribe Poranthereae. The sole species is Notoleptopus decaisnei. It is a monoecious shrub, native to Australia, New Guinea, and Indonesia.

Notoleptopus decaisnei had long been treated as a species of Leptopus, but in 2007, a molecular phylogenetic study of DNA sequences found it to be sister to a clade consisting of Pseudophyllanthus and Poranthera. In 2008, the new genus Notoleptopus was created for it.

The species, N. decaisnei, has eleven synonyms, and was first described as Andrachne decaisnei by George Bentham in 1873. The species epithet honours Joseph Decaisne.

- Andrachne decaisnei Benth.
- Andrachne decaisnei var. orbicularis Benth.
- Andrachne fruticosa Decne. ex Müll.Arg.
- Andrachne fruticosa var. orbicularis (Benth.) Pax & K.Hoffm.
- Andrachne orbicularis (Benth.) Domin
- Arachne decaisnei (Benth.) Pojark.
- Arachne fruticosa Hurus.
- Arachne orbicularis (Benth.) Pojark.
- Leptopus decaisnei (Benth.) Pojark.
- Leptopus decaisnei var. orbicularis (Benth.) Airy Shaw
- Leptopus orbicularis (Benth.) Pojark.

== Description ==
Bentham describes the species Andrachne Decaisnei as follows:

Apparently annual, but the stems hard and woody-looking at the base, much branched, decumbent, attaining 1 to 2 or even 3 ft., the whole plant softly villous. Leaves broadly obovate or obovate-oblong, ½ to ¾ in. long, on rather long petioles. Male flowers 2 or 3 together on very short pedicels. Calyx-segments 5, lanceolate, acute, spreading, about ½ line long. Petals narrow, nearly as long as the calyx. Female flowers solitary in the same axils as the males, on pedicels attaining 1 line when in fruit. Calyx-segments under the fruit broadly ovate, fully 1 line long, the base of the calyx contracted into a distinct stipes. Styles divided to the base into 2 branches. Capsule depressed, orbicular, villous, about 2 lines diameter.

In Australia, it is found in Western Australia, the Northern Territory and Queensland. In Queensland, under the Nature Conservation Act 1992, it is declared a species of "least concern".
