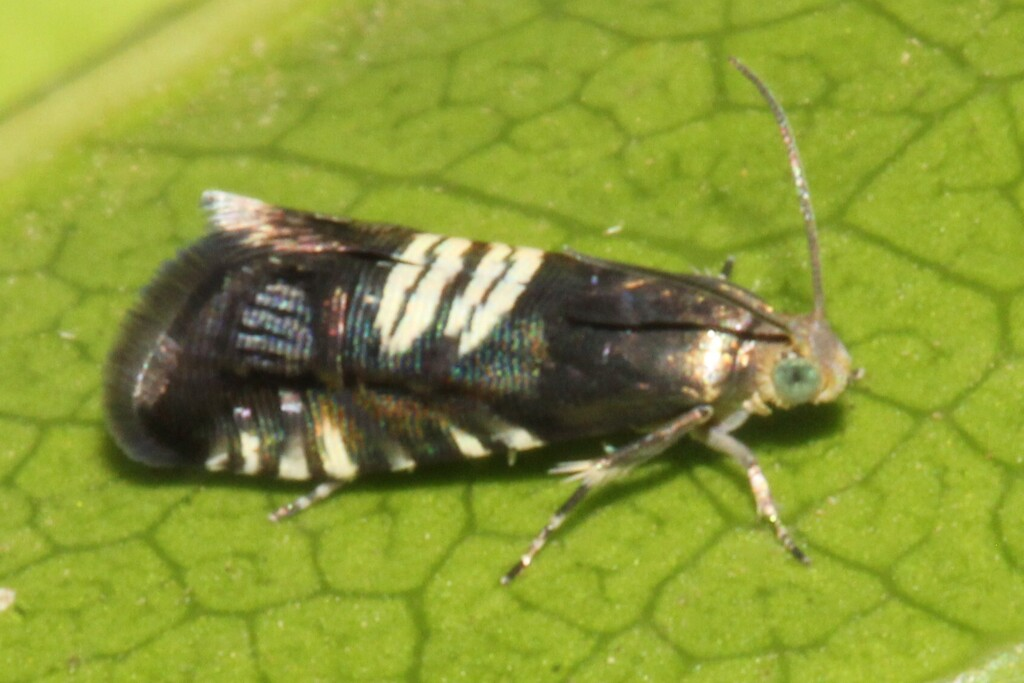

Scientific classification
- Kingdom: Animalia
- Phylum: Arthropoda
- Clade: Pancrustacea
- Class: Insecta
- Order: Lepidoptera
- Family: Tortricidae
- Genus: Grapholita
- Species: G. percutiens

Binomial name
- Grapholita percutiens Razowski & Karisch, 2017

= Grapholita percutiens =

Species of moth

Grapholita percutiens is a species of moth in the family Tortricidae. It was described by Razowski & Karisch in 2017. This species has been documented in Sierra Leone and The Gambia.

== Ecology ==
Grapholita percutiens has been reared on Hymenocardia acida through the Caterpillar Rearing Group.
