= Poranthereae =

Scientific classification
- Kingdom: Plantae
- Clade: Tracheophytes
- Clade: Angiosperms
- Clade: Eudicots
- Clade: Rosids
- Order: Malpighiales
- Family: Phyllanthaceae
- Subfamily: Phyllanthoideae
- Tribe: Poranthereae; Gruning

Genera
- Andrachne; Meineckia; Notoleptopus; Pseudophyllanthus; Poranthera; Phyllanthopsis; Actephila; Leptopus

Tribe of flowering plants

Poranthereae is a tribe in the plant family Phyllanthaceae. It is one of ten tribes in the family, and one of four tribes in the subfamily Phyllanthoideae. Poranthereae comprises about 111 species, distributed into eight genera. The largest genera and the number of species in each are Actephila (31), Meineckia (30), and Andrachne (22).

The tribe consists of herbs, shrubs, and small to medium trees. They have a cosmopolitan distribution, occurring on all continents, except Antarctica. The circumscription and classification of Poranthereae were substantially revised following phylogenetic analysis of DNA sequences from members of the family Phyllanthaceae.

Within Poranthereae, groups of related genera are strongly correlated with habitat and geographical distribution. For example, Notoleptopus, Pseudophyllanthus, and Poranthera are restricted to the Old World Southern Hemisphere.

== Description ==
Monoecious, sometimes dioecious herbs, shrubs, or trees to 6m tall. Thorns or other armature absent. Stipules present, sometimes leaf-like is some Meineckia. Petioles present or absent, not pulvinate. leaves simple, arrangement alternate, subopposite, or in some Poranthera, opposite. margins entire. Inflorescences axillary, or rarely, apparently terminal. Flowers solitary to fasciculate. Sepals free, greenish, persistent. Petals present or absent, often partly adnate to the nectary disk, equal to the sepals or shorter, white or greenish, usually larger in staminate than in pistillate flowers. Disk present, extrastaminal; annular or divided into alternisepalous segments or glands. Stamens opposite the sepals, free or fused for up to 9/10 of their length. Anthers latrorse, at least in bud, opening by longitudinal slits, or in Poranthera, by pores. Ovary usually divided into three locules. Two ovules in each locule. Styles free to almost completely fused. Fruit explosively dehiscent. Seeds usually two per locule; sometimes one in Actephila and Meineckia.

== Taxonomy ==
The presence and size of petals is an important character in the taxonomy of Poranthereae. In most species, the petals of staminate flowers are almost as large as the sepals, and the petals of pistillate flowers are much smaller.

Petal loss or reduction has occurred at least four times in the evolution of Poranthereae. It has been observed in Poranthera, Actephila, Andrachne, and Meineckia. In one species of Poranthera and in several of Actephila, the petal size is variable, and sometimes the petals are completely absent. In some species of Actephila, petal number as well as size is variable. In Andrachne subgenus Phyllanthidea, staminate petals are lost in some species, and pistillate petals are lost in others. Petals are entirely absent in Meineckia subgenus Meineckia.

== History ==
The name "Poranthereae" was first used by G.R. Grüning in 1913. The type genus for the tribe is Poranthera, which was so named because the anthers open poricidally rather than by longitudinal slits.

Two similar treatments of Poranthereae were presented by Grady Webster and Alan Radcliffe-Smith, in 1994 and 2001, respectively. These authors considered Poranthereae to be part of Euphorbiaceae sensu lato, a taxon that is now known to be paraphyletic. Their circumscription of the tribe was different from that which is now generally accepted.

Poranthaceae, as currently understood, was first recognized in phylogenetic analyses of DNA sequences of selected genes. The existence of this clade was not entirely unanticipated and had been at least partially suggested in several studies based on morphology. The tribe was formally established in its present form in a revision of Phyllanthaceae in 2006. In 2007, a phylogeny of Poranthereae was presented by Vorontsova et alii, based on DNA sequences of matK and ITS. This paper included much on the taxonomic history of the tribe.

In 2008, based on molecular phylogenetic studies, Vorontsova and Hoffmann published a revised classification of the tribe. A description of each genus and a key to the genera were included. Four of the genera recognized by Radcliffe-Smith (Zimmermannia, Zimmermanniopsis, Archileptopus, and Oreoporanthera) were sunk into other genera and three new genera were established. Notoleptopus was "carved" out of Leptopus, while Pseudophyllanthus and Phyllanthopsis were removed from Andrachne.

Some of the genera in Poranthereae are still in need of revision. This is especially true of Actephila, the most variable and least understood genus in the tribe.

== Phylogeny ==
The following phylogenetic tree is based on the one by Vorontsova and Hoffmann (2008). All branches have at least 75% bootstrap support. Branches with less statistical support are collapsed to form the tetratomy in the tree below.

- Poranthereae
  - - Andrachne subgenus Phyllanthidea
    - Andrachne subgenus Andrachne
  - - Meineckia subgenus Petaliferae
    - Meineckia subgenus Meineckia
  - - Notoleptopus
    - - Pseudophyllanthus
      - Poranthera
  - - Phyllanthopsis
    - - Actephila
      - Leptopus
