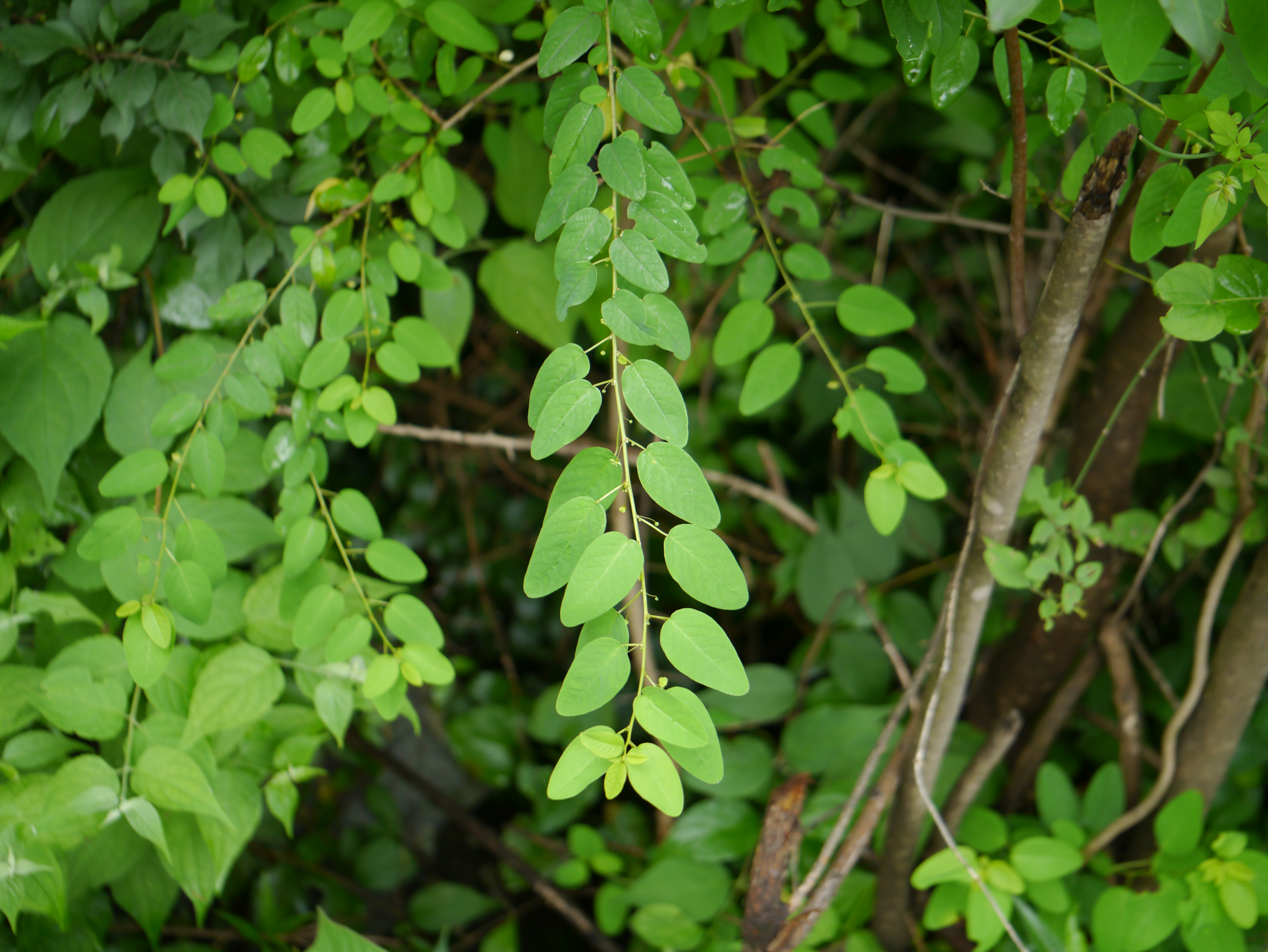
- Leptopus cordifolius

Scientific classification
- Kingdom: Plantae
- Clade: Tracheophytes
- Clade: Angiosperms
- Clade: Eudicots
- Clade: Rosids
- Order: Malpighiales
- Family: Phyllanthaceae
- Subfamily: Phyllanthoideae
- Tribe: Poranthereae
- Genus: Leptopus; Decne. 1836 not Klotzsch & Garcke 1860 (syn of Euphorbia)

Type species
- Leptopus cordifolius Decaisne

Synonyms
- Andrachne (Endlicher) Pojarkova; Chorisandrachne Airy Shaw; Thelypetalum Gagnep.; Arachne (Endl.) Pojark.; Archileptopus P.T.Li; Andrachne [unranked] Arachne Endlicher

= Leptopus =

Genus of flowering plants

Leptopus, the maidenbushes, are a genus of plants in the family Phyllanthaceae native to southern Asia from the Caucasus east to China and Maluku. The plants are monoecious herbs and shrubs with simple, entire leaves and small, green flowers.

Leptopus is one of eight genera in the tribe Poranthereae and comprises 9 species. It is the sister of Actephila. The type species is Leptopus cordifolius. The name is derived from two Greek words, leptos, "thin, slender, or small", and pous, "foot", a reference to slender pedicels. The genus was first described in 1836 and revised in 2009.

Leptopus fangdingianus had been placed by some authors in a separate genus, Archileptopus, but it was shown in 2007 that recognition of Archileptopus makes Leptopus paraphyletic. Phyllanthopsis phyllanthoides has been placed in Leptopus as well as in Andrachne. In 2007, it was shown to not properly belong to either genus and in 2008 was assigned to a new genus, Phyllanthopsis.

Species

1. Leptopus australis - Hainan, SE Asia
2. Leptopus chinensis - China, Myanmar, Pakistan, Iran, Caucasus
3. Leptopus clarkei - S China, Assam, Myanmar, Vietnam
4. Leptopus cordifolius - Afghanistan, Himalayas
5. Leptopus emicans - Arunachal Pradesh, Myanmar
6. Leptopus fangdingianus - Guangxi
7. Leptopus hainanensis - Hainan
8. Leptopus nepalensis - Nepal
9. Leptopus pachyphyllus - Guangxi
10. Leptopus robinsonii - Vietnam

formerly included

moved to other genera: Chorisandrachne Euphorbia Notoleptopus Phyllanthopsis

1. L. adiantoides - Euphorbia adiantoides
2. L. brasiliensis - Euphorbia hyssopifolia
3. L. decaisnei - Notoleptopus decaisnei
4. L. diplospermus - Chorisandrachne diplosperma
5. L. dominianus - Notoleptopus decaisnei
6. L. hartwegii - Euphorbia adiantoides
7. L. ocymoides - Euphorbia ocymoidea
8. L. orbicularis - Notoleptopus decaisnei
9. L. phyllanthoides - Phyllanthopsis phyllanthoides
10. L. poeppigii - Euphorbia poeppigii
11. L. segoviensis - Euphorbia segoviensis
