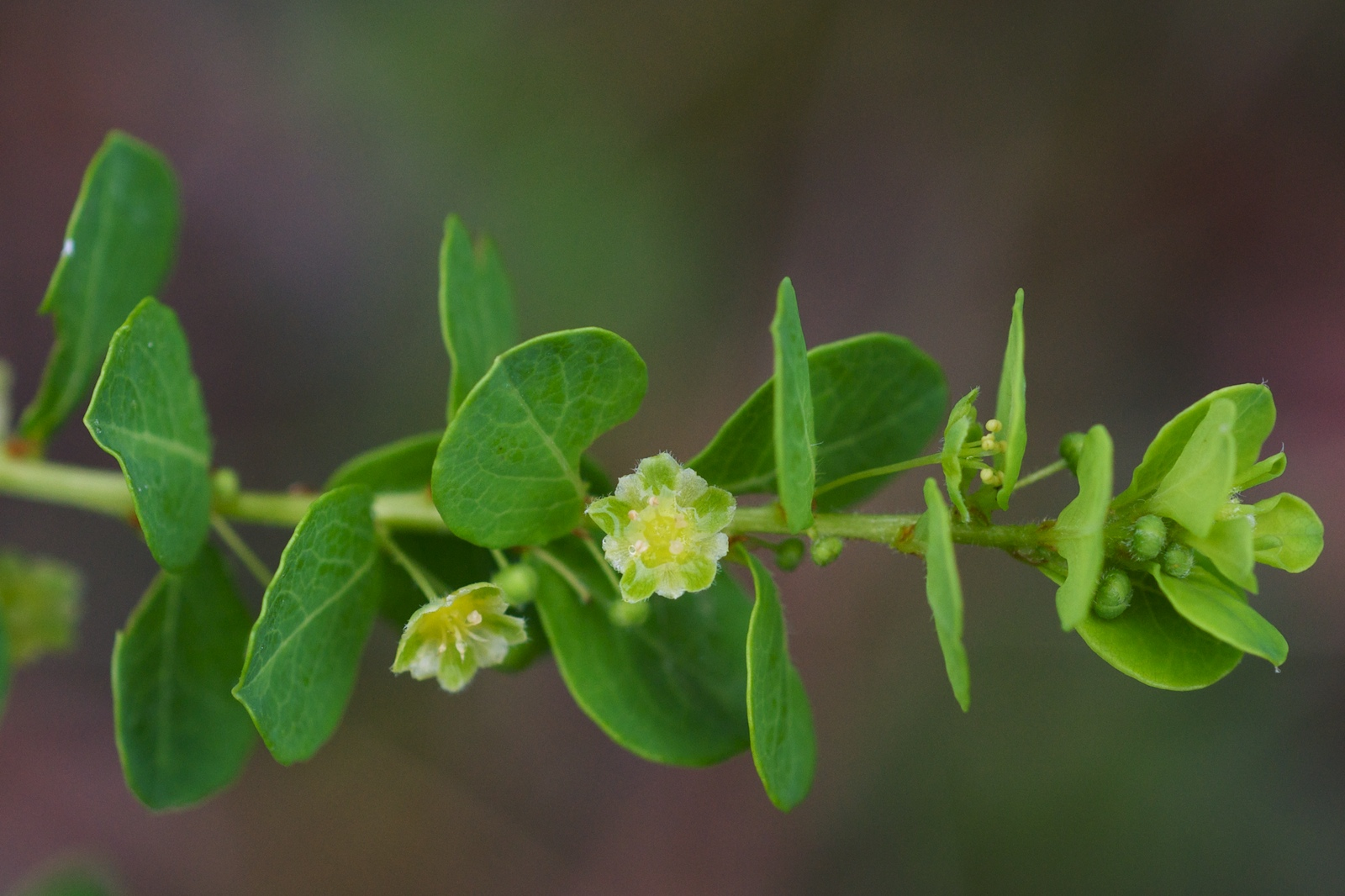
- Phyllanthopsis phyllanthoides

Scientific classification
- Kingdom: Plantae
- Clade: Tracheophytes
- Clade: Angiosperms
- Clade: Eudicots
- Clade: Rosids
- Order: Malpighiales
- Family: Phyllanthaceae
- Subfamily: Phyllanthoideae
- Tribe: Poranthereae
- Genus: Phyllanthopsis (Scheele) Vorontsova & Petra Hoffmann

Type species
- Phyllanthopsis phyllanthoides Vorontsova & Petra Hoffmann

Species
- Phyllanthopsis phyllanthoides; Phyllanthopsis arida

= Phyllanthopsis =

Genus of flowering plants

Phyllanthopsis is a genus of flowering plants in the family Phyllanthaceae. It is one of the eight genera in the tribe Poranthereae. It has two species. The type species is Phyllanthopsis phyllanthoides.

Phyllanthopsis is native to Texas, Oklahoma and Mexico. It consists of monoecious or dioecious shrubs.

Phyllanthopsis phyllanthoides had been placed in Leptopus or Andrachne and Phyllanthopsis arida had been placed in Andrachne. In 2007, a molecular phylogenetic study showed that these two species did not belong in either of these genera because they formed a clade that is sister to a clade consisting of Leptopus and Actephila. In 2008, the new genus Phyllanthopsis was created for these two species.
