= Leioproctus exilicrinitus =

Scientific classification
- Kingdom: Animalia
- Phylum: Arthropoda
- Clade: Pancrustacea
- Class: Insecta
- Order: Hymenoptera
- Family: Colletidae
- Genus: Leioproctus
- Species: L. exilicrinitus

Binomial name
- Leioproctus exilicrinitus Batley, 2025

Species of bee

Leioproctus exilicrinitus, or Leioproctus (Minycolletes) exilicrinitus, is a species of bee in the family Colletidae and subfamily Colletinae. It is endemic to Australia. It was described by entomologist Michael Batley in 2025.

== Etymology ==
The specific epithet exilicrinitus (Latin: "weak" + "hair") is an anatomical reference to "the sparse hind tibial scopa of the female".

== Description ==
The holotype female body length is 5.2 mm, head width 1.7 mm; male body length 4.4 mm, head width 1.6 mm. Integumental colouration is mainly black with brown markings, male metasoma dark brown. The hair is white to brown.

== Distribution and habitat ==
The species occurs in eastern New South Wales. The type locality is Mellong Swamp in Wollemi National Park.

== Behaviour ==
The adults are flying mellivores. Flowering plants visited by the bees include Poranthera ericifolia, Isopogon anemonifolius and Mitrasacme polymorpha.

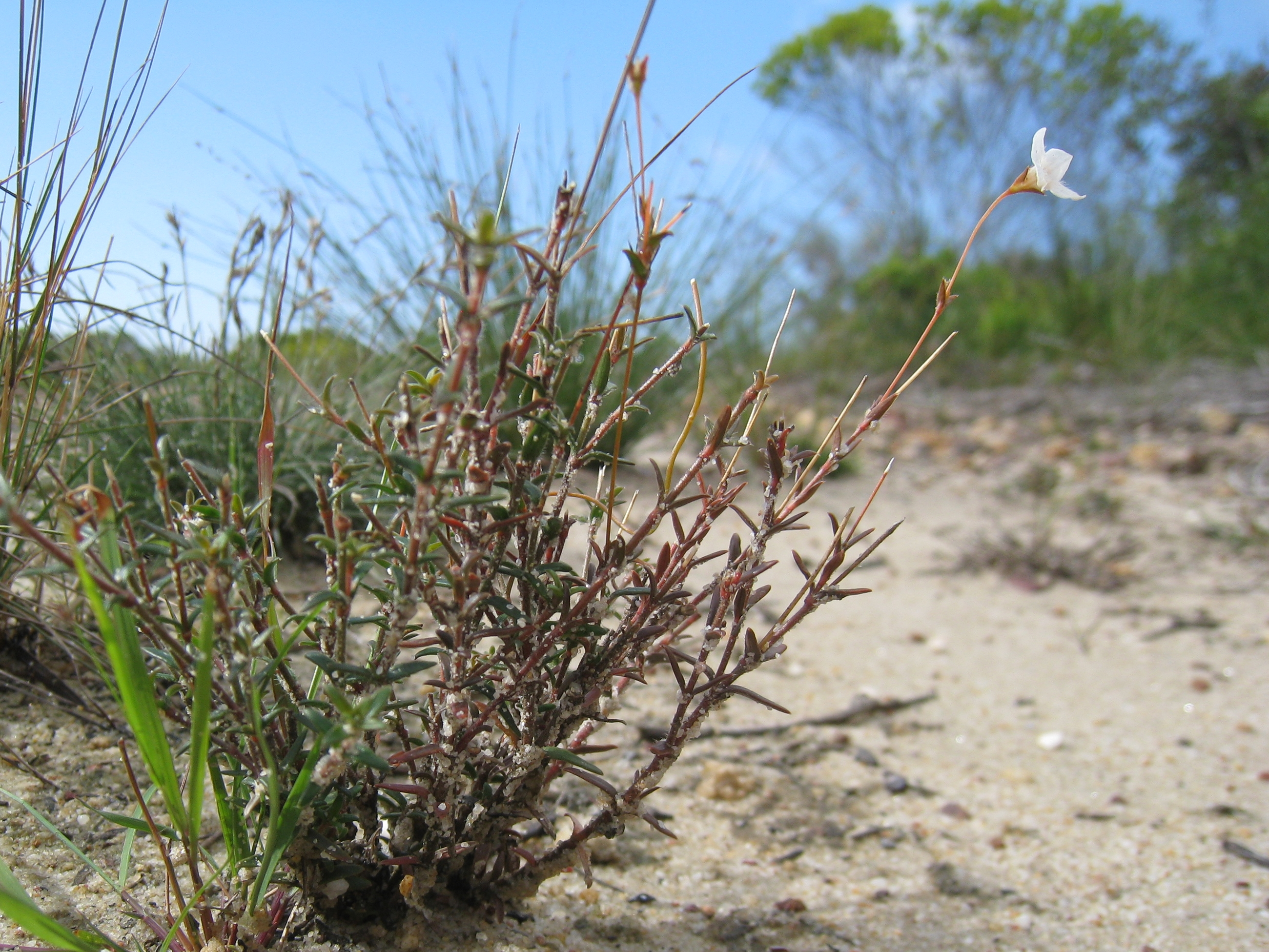
Mitrasacme polymorpha (mitre weed), a forage plant of the bees

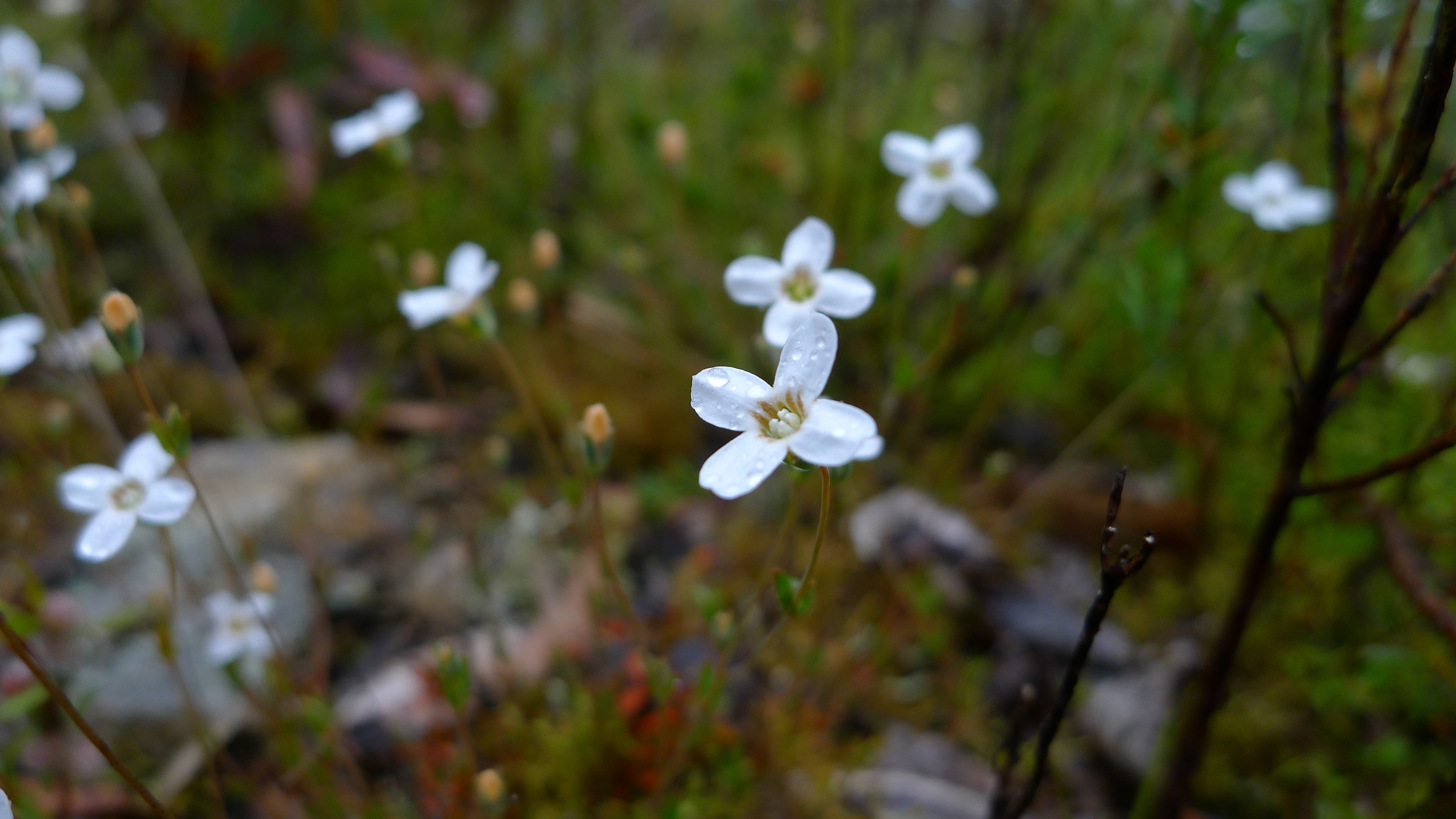
Flowers of Mitrasacme polymorpha
