= GrassBase =

Database of grasses

- Website type: Flora
- Owner: Royal Botanic Gardens, Kew
- Creators: W.D. Clayton; M.S. Vorontsova; K.T. Harman; H. Williamson
- Website: www.kew.org/data/grasses-db.html
- Commercial: no

GrassBase (or GrassBase – The Online World Grass Flora) is a web-based database of grasses, continually maintained and updated by the Royal Botanic Gardens, Kew.

As of 2015, GrassBase was one of the largest (along with GrassWorld) structured datasets for plants. In the January 2016 update, it had morphological descriptions for 11,369 accepted species of grasses and listings for 64,213 botanical names.

Authorship of the database is credited to W. D. Clayton, M. S. Vorontsova, K. T. Harman and H. Williamson.
