= Andrachne schweinfurthii =

Conservation status
- Vulnerable (IUCN 3.1)

Scientific classification
- Kingdom: Plantae
- Clade: Tracheophytes
- Clade: Angiosperms
- Clade: Eudicots
- Clade: Rosids
- Order: Malpighiales
- Family: Phyllanthaceae
- Genus: Andrachne
- Species: A. schweinfurthii

Binomial name
- Andrachne schweinfurthii (Balf.f.) Radcl-Sm. (1971)

Varieties
- Andrachne schweinfurthii var. papillosa Radcl.-Sm.; Andrachne schweinfurthii var. schweinfurthii

Synonyms
- Securinega schweinfurthii Balf.f.

Species of plant

Andrachne schweinfurthii is a species of plant in the family Phyllanthaceae. It is a subshrub native to Somalia and to the island of Socotra, which is part of Yemen. Its natural habitats are tropical dry forests and woodlands and rocky areas.

It is a perennial herb or subshrub with stems to 45 cm long, slender and often trailing. All parts of the plant parts glabrous. It sometimes flowers in the first year.

== Varieties ==
Two varieties are accepted.

- Andrachne schweinfurthii var. papillosa Radcl.-Sm. – endemic to Socotra, where it grows among rocks, both limestone and granite, in semi-deciduous woodland near the Muqadrihon Pass from 450 to 500 metres elevation.
- Andrachne schweinfurthii var. schweinfurthii (synonym Andrachne somalensis Pax) – native to Somalia and Socotra.
