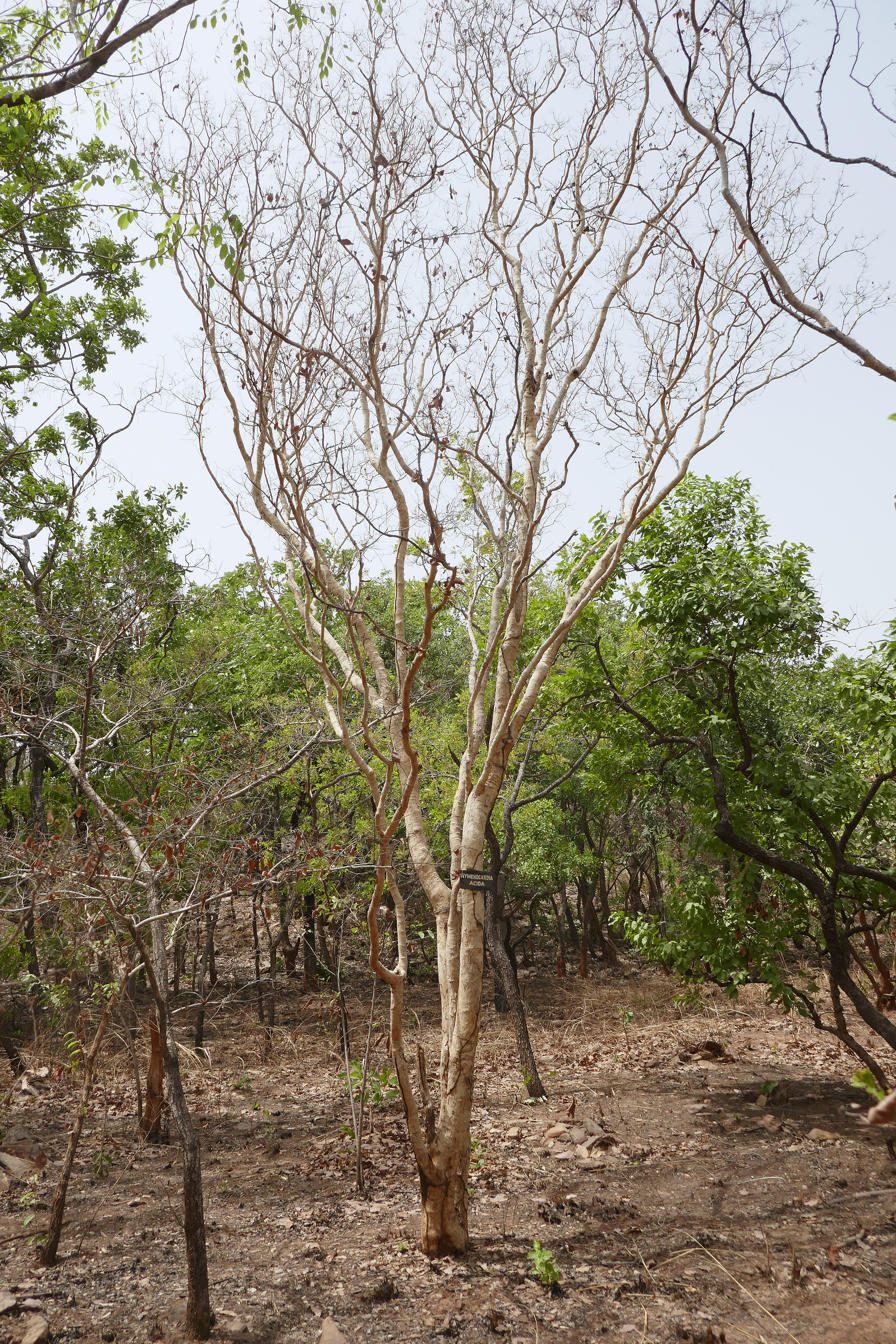
- Hymenocardia acida

Scientific classification
- Kingdom: Plantae
- Clade: Tracheophytes
- Clade: Angiosperms
- Clade: Eudicots
- Clade: Rosids
- Order: Malpighiales
- Family: Phyllanthaceae
- Subfamily: Antidesmatoideae
- Tribe: Antidesmateae
- Subtribe: Hymenocardiinae; Petra Hoffm.

Genera
- Didymocistus Hymenocardia

= Hymenocardiinae =

Tribe of flowering plants

Hymenocardiinae is a subtribe of the plant family Phyllanthaceae. It comprises two genera.

== Genera ==
- Didymocistus
- Hymenocardia

== See also ==
- Taxonomy of the Phyllanthaceae
