= Meineckia nguruensis =

Conservation status
- Vulnerable (IUCN 3.1)

Scientific classification
- Kingdom: Plantae
- Clade: Tracheophytes
- Clade: Angiosperms
- Clade: Eudicots
- Clade: Rosids
- Order: Malpighiales
- Family: Phyllanthaceae
- Genus: Meineckia
- Species: M. nguruensis

Binomial name
- Meineckia nguruensis (Radcl.-Sm.) Radcl.-Sm.

Synonyms
- Zimmermania nguruensis

Species of flowering plant

Meineckia nguruensis is a species of plant in the family Phyllanthaceae. It is endemic to Tanzania.
