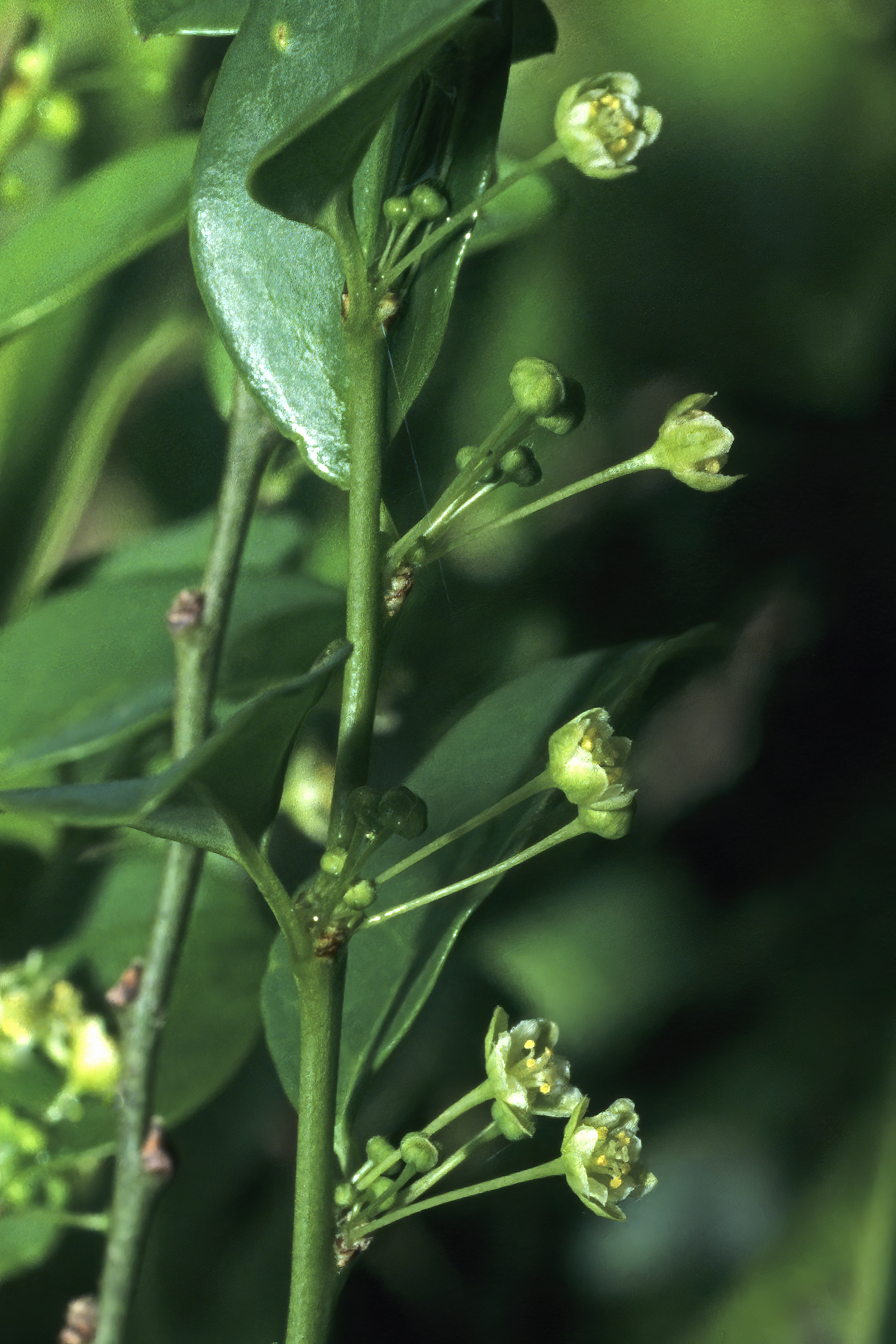
- Pseudophyllanthus ovalis in Limpopo, South Africa

Scientific classification
- Kingdom: Plantae
- Clade: Tracheophytes
- Clade: Angiosperms
- Clade: Eudicots
- Clade: Rosids
- Order: Malpighiales
- Family: Phyllanthaceae
- Subfamily: Phyllanthoideae
- Tribe: Poranthereae
- Genus: Pseudophyllanthus (Müll. Arg.) Voronts. & Petra Hoffm.
- Species: P. ovalis

Binomial name
- Pseudophyllanthus ovalis (E.Mey. ex Sond.) Voronts. & Petra Hoffm.

Synonyms
- Andrachne ovalis (E.Mey. ex Sond.) Müll.Arg. Phyllanthus ovalis E.Mey. ex Sond.

= Pseudophyllanthus =

Genus of plants

Pseudophyllanthus is a monotypic genus of flowering plants in the family Phyllanthaceae. It is one of the eight genera in the tribe Poranthereae. Its closest relative is Poranthera. Its sole species is Pseudophyllanthus ovalis.

It is a dioecious, or rarely monoecious, shrub or small tree, native to southern Africa. It had been included in the genus Andrachne, but in 2007 a molecular phylogenetic study of DNA sequences showed that it did not belong there. In 2008, the new genus Pseudophyllanthus was created for it.
