= Poranthera ericoides =

Scientific classification
- Kingdom: Plantae
- Clade: Tracheophytes
- Clade: Angiosperms
- Clade: Eudicots
- Clade: Rosids
- Order: Malpighiales
- Family: Phyllanthaceae
- Genus: Poranthera
- Species: P. ericoides

Binomial name
- Poranthera ericoides Klotzsch, 1848

Species of plant

Poranthera ericoides is a species of plant native to Western Australia.

It was first described by German pharmacist and botanist, Johann Friedrich Klotzsch, in 1848.
