= Poranthera corymbosa =

Scientific classification
- Kingdom: Plantae
- Clade: Tracheophytes
- Clade: Angiosperms
- Clade: Eudicots
- Clade: Rosids
- Order: Malpighiales
- Family: Phyllanthaceae
- Genus: Poranthera
- Species: P. corymbosa

Binomial name
- Poranthera corymbosa Brongn.

Species of plant

Poranthera corymbosa is a species of plant native to Australia.
