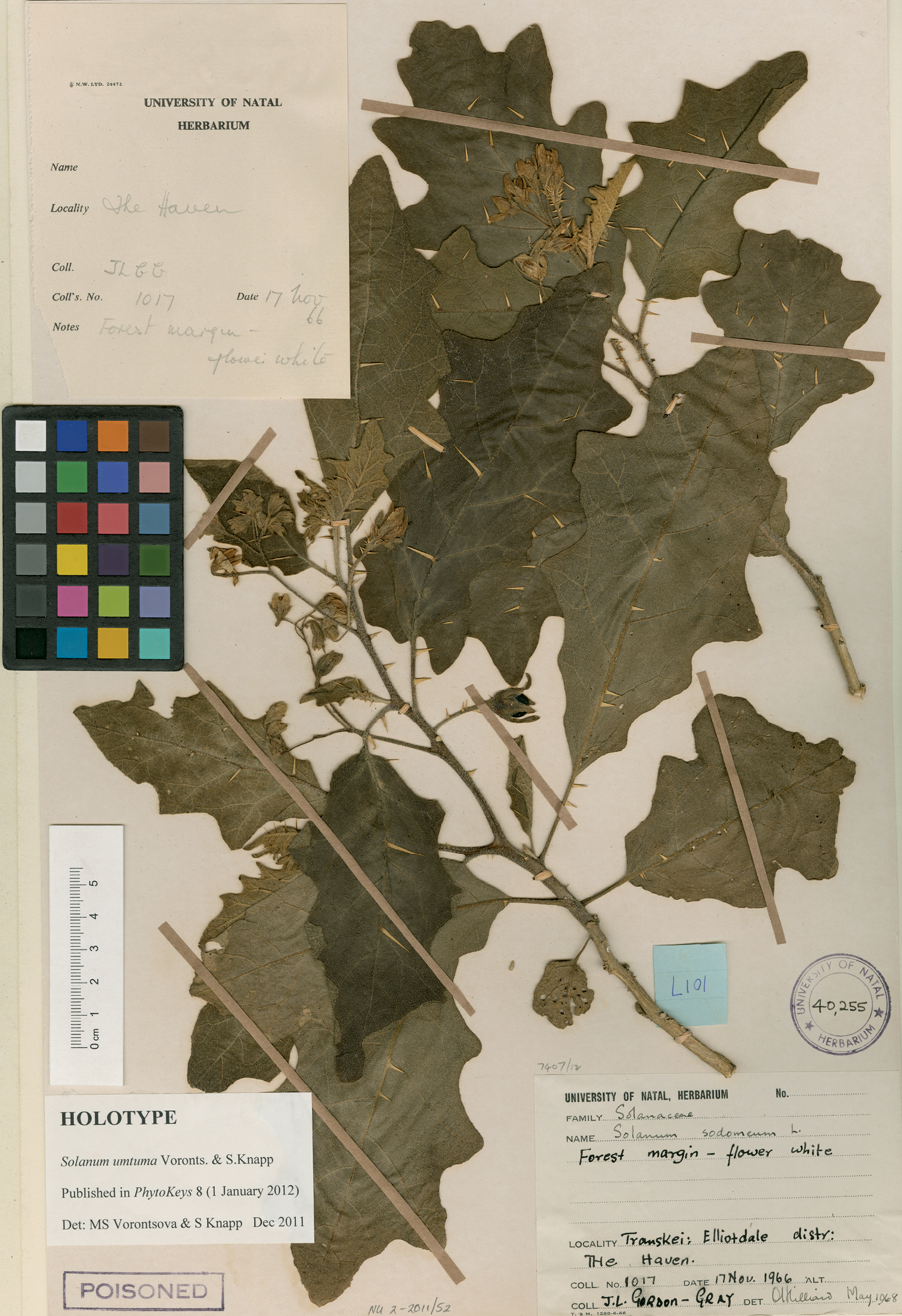

Scientific classification
- Kingdom: Plantae
- Clade: Tracheophytes
- Clade: Angiosperms
- Clade: Eudicots
- Clade: Asterids
- Order: Solanales
- Family: Solanaceae
- Genus: Solanum
- Species: S. umtuma

Binomial name
- Solanum umtuma Voronts. & S.Knapp

= Solanum umtuma =

Species of plant

Solanum umtuma is a species of plant in the Solanaceae family.

It is related to tomatoes. The species is andromonoecous.

It can be found in South Africa in areas like Cape Province and KwaZulu-Natal.

The species was described in 2012 by Sandra Knapp and Maria Vorontsova, and was the first description to take advantage of the change made by the Melbourne Code to the plant taxonomy regulations by being electronic-only.
