= Meineckia capillipes =

Conservation status
- Vulnerable (IUCN 2.3)

Scientific classification
- Kingdom: Plantae
- Clade: Tracheophytes
- Clade: Angiosperms
- Clade: Eudicots
- Clade: Rosids
- Order: Malpighiales
- Family: Phyllanthaceae
- Genus: Meineckia
- Species: M. capillipes

Binomial name
- Meineckia capillipes (S.F.Blake) G.L.Webster

Species of flowering plant

Meineckia capillipes is a species of plant in the family Phyllanthaceae. It is endemic to Tanzania. Known locally as Kizeza-mzitu, the plant is small (up to 10 meters), with white, soft wood. The leaves are simple and alternate, and the flowers and fruit are green. The roots are used medicinally by local peoples for stomach problems.
