= Meineckia stipularis =

Conservation status
- Endangered (IUCN 3.1)

Scientific classification
- Kingdom: Plantae
- Clade: Tracheophytes
- Clade: Angiosperms
- Clade: Eudicots
- Clade: Rosids
- Order: Malpighiales
- Family: Phyllanthaceae
- Genus: Meineckia
- Species: M. stipularis

Binomial name
- Meineckia stipularis (Radcl.-Sm.) Brunel ex Radcl.-Sm.

Synonyms
- Zimmermannia stipularis

Species of flowering plant

Meineckia stipularis is a species of plant in the family Phyllanthaceae. It is endemic to Tanzania, found in the Mangalisa forest in the Rubeho Mountains (part of the Eastern Arc Mountains).
