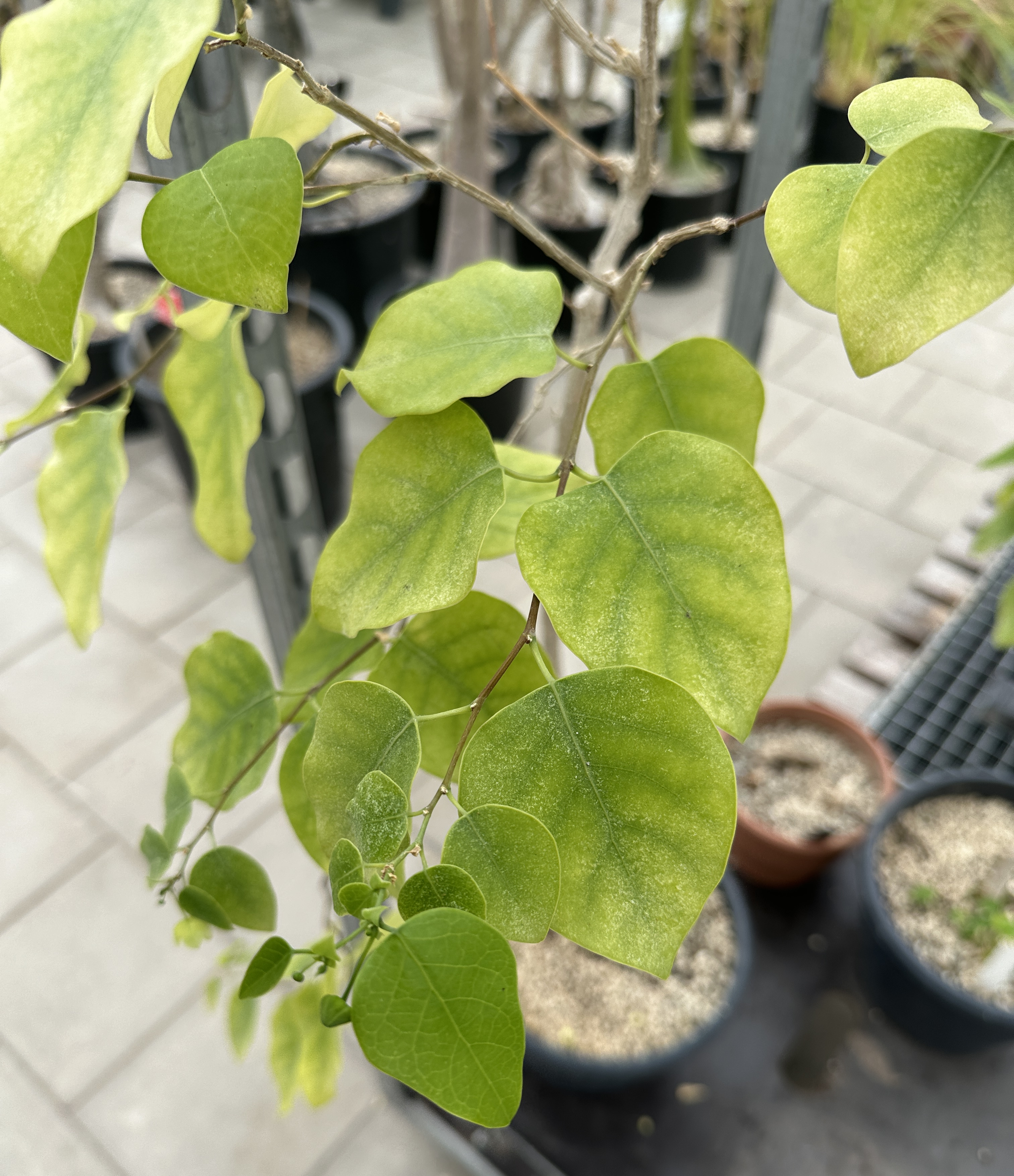

Conservation status
- Critically Endangered (IUCN 3.1)

Scientific classification
- Kingdom: Plantae
- Clade: Tracheophytes
- Clade: Angiosperms
- Clade: Eudicots
- Clade: Rosids
- Order: Malpighiales
- Family: Phyllanthaceae
- Genus: Meineckia
- Species: M. ovata

Binomial name
- Meineckia ovata (E.A.Bruce) Jean F.Brunel

Synonyms
- Zimmermannia ovata, E.A. Bruce

= Meineckia ovata =

Species of flowering plant

Meineckia ovata is a species of plant in the family Phyllanthaceae. It is endemic to the Taita Hills in Kenya. It is threatened by habitat loss.
