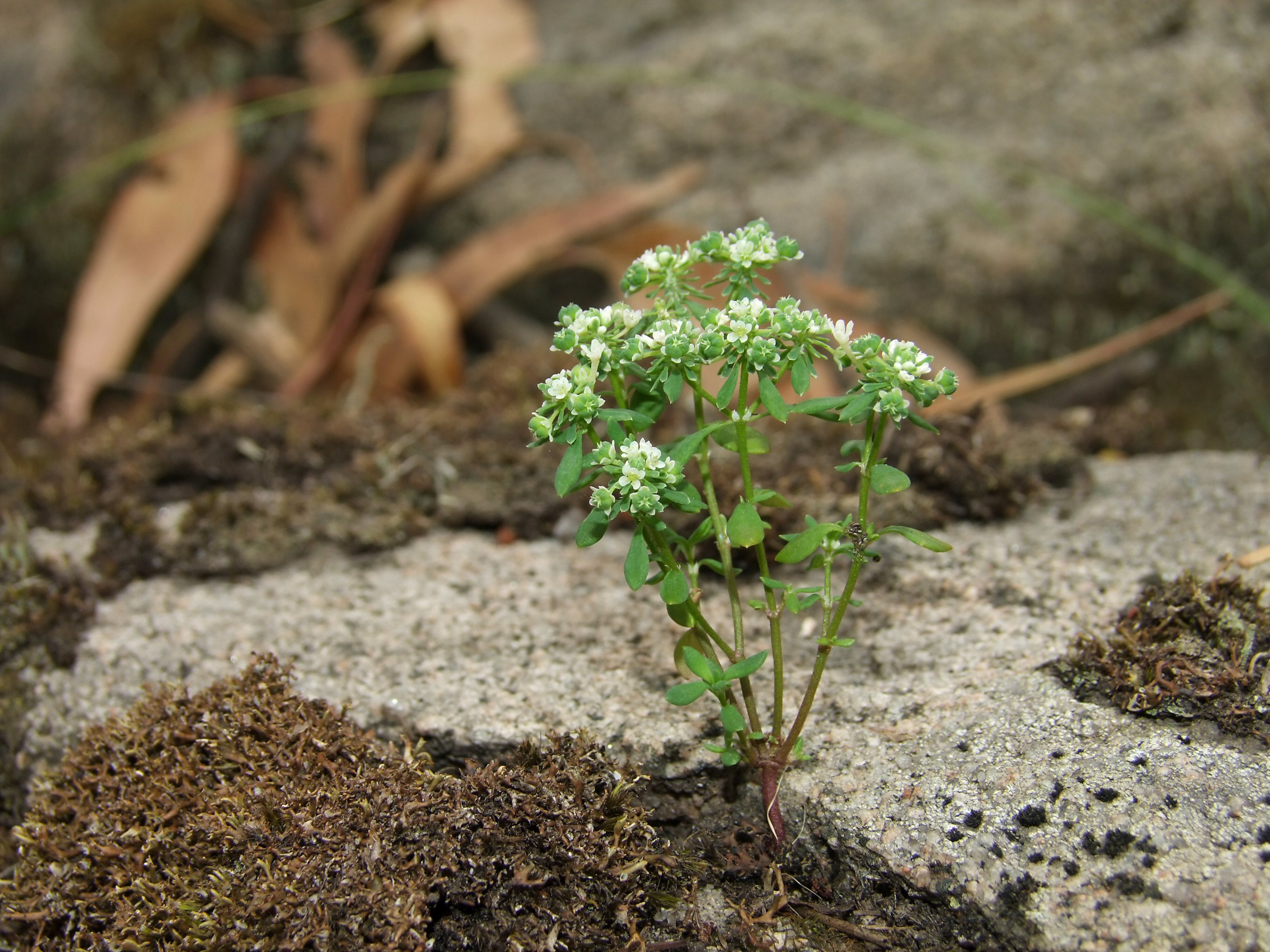
- Growing in Baluk Willam Nature Conservation Reserve, Belgrave South, Victoria.

Scientific classification
- Kingdom: Plantae
- Clade: Tracheophytes
- Clade: Angiosperms
- Clade: Eudicots
- Clade: Rosids
- Order: Malpighiales
- Family: Phyllanthaceae
- Genus: Poranthera
- Species: P. microphylla

Binomial name
- Poranthera microphylla Brongn.

= Poranthera microphylla =

Small poranthera

Species of herb

Poranthera microphylla, commonly known as small poranthera, is a flowering plant in the family Phyllanthaceae. It is a small, widespread Australian herb with blue-grey leaves and white flowers.

== Description ==
Poranthera microphylla is a decumbent or more or less upright, slender, densely branched, annual herb up to 30 cm (12 in) high. It has soft, smooth branches, egg to spoon-shaped blue-grey leaves, thin, usually 4–15 mm (0.16–0.59 in) long, 8–15 cm (3.1–5.9 in) wide, margins more or less flat or slightly recurved, petiole 2–5 mm (0.079–0.197 in) long, apex blunt or rounded and mostly with a short, triangular point. The flowers are in a corymb about 0.3–0.8 cm (0.12–0.31 in) across, petals white or pink, bracts narrowly egg-shaped, up to about 4 mm (0.16 in) long and on a pedicels to 1.5 mm (0.059 in). Flowering occurs mostly from September to April and the fruit is a 3-lobed capsule 1.5–2 cm (0.59–0.79 in) in diameter, white and warty.

== Taxonomy and naming ==
Poranthera microphylla was first formally described in 1833 by Adolphe-Théodore Brongniart and the description was published in Annales des Sciences Naturelles. The specific epithet (microphylla) means "small leaved".

== Distribution and habitat ==
Small poranthera is a widespread species and grows in dry, montane forest, woodland and grassland in New South Wales, Victoria, Western Australia, Tasmania, Queensland and the Australian Capital Territory. It is also native to New Zealand where it is very uncommon in the top of the South Island.
