= Meineckia filipes =

Conservation status
- Data Deficient (IUCN 3.1)

Scientific classification
- Kingdom: Plantae
- Clade: Tracheophytes
- Clade: Angiosperms
- Clade: Eudicots
- Clade: Rosids
- Order: Malpighiales
- Family: Phyllanthaceae
- Genus: Meineckia
- Species: M. filipes

Binomial name
- Meineckia filipes (Balf.f.) G.L.Webster

Synonyms
- Phyllanthus filipes Balf.f.

Species of plant

Meineckia filipes is a species of plant in the family Phyllanthaceae. It is endemic to the Socotra Islands in the Indian Ocean, part of the Republic of Yemen. Its natural habitats are subtropical or tropical dry forests and subtropical or tropical dry shrubland.
