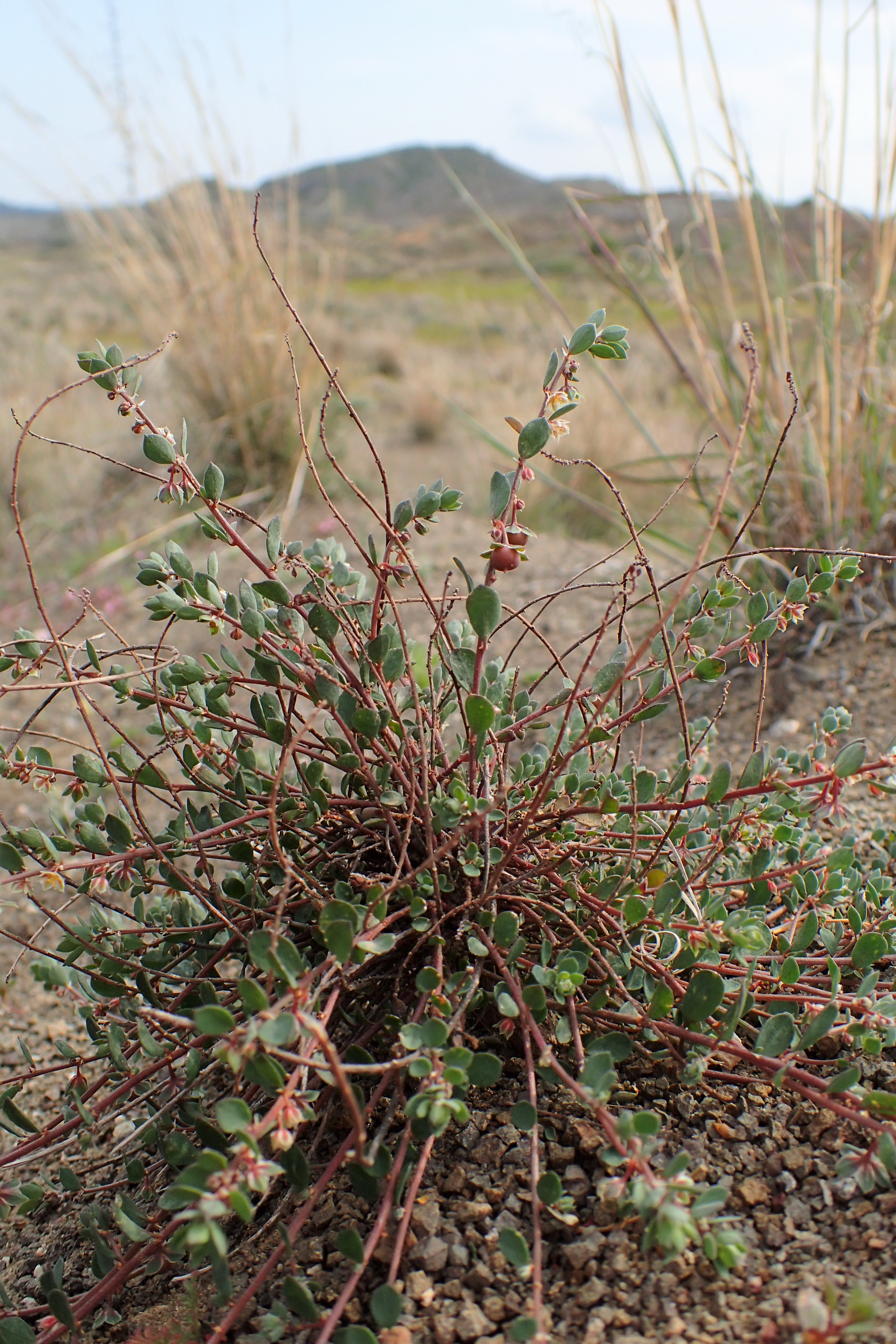

Scientific classification
- Kingdom: Plantae
- Clade: Tracheophytes
- Clade: Angiosperms
- Clade: Eudicots
- Clade: Rosids
- Order: Malpighiales
- Family: Phyllanthaceae
- Genus: Andrachne
- Species: A. telephioides

Binomial name
- Andrachne telephioides L.

= Andrachne telephioides =

Species of plant

Andrachne telephioides is a species of shrub in the family Phyllanthaceae. They have a self-supporting growth form and simple, broad leaves. Individuals can grow to 12 cm.

== Sources ==
This article incorporates text from a free content work. Licensed under CC0 (license statement/permission). Text taken from Andrachne telephioides. Encyclopedia of Life.
