= Protomegabaria =

Scientific classification
- Kingdom: Plantae
- Clade: Tracheophytes
- Clade: Angiosperms
- Clade: Eudicots
- Clade: Rosids
- Order: Malpighiales
- Family: Phyllanthaceae
- Subfamily: Antidesmatoideae
- Tribe: Scepeae
- Genus: Protomegabaria; Hutch.

Genus of flowering plants

Protomegabaria is a genus of flowering plant belonging to the family Phyllanthaceae first described as a genus in 1911. It is native to western and central Africa. It is dioecious, with male and female flowers on separate plants.

Species

1. Protomegabaria macrophylla (Pax) Hutch. - Nigeria, Cameroon, Republic of the Congo, Gabon, Gulf of Guinea Islands
2. Protomegabaria meiocarpa J.Léonard - Gabon, Democratic Republic of the Congo
3. Protomegabaria stapfiana (Beille) Hutch. - West Africa (Liberia to Republic of the Congo)
