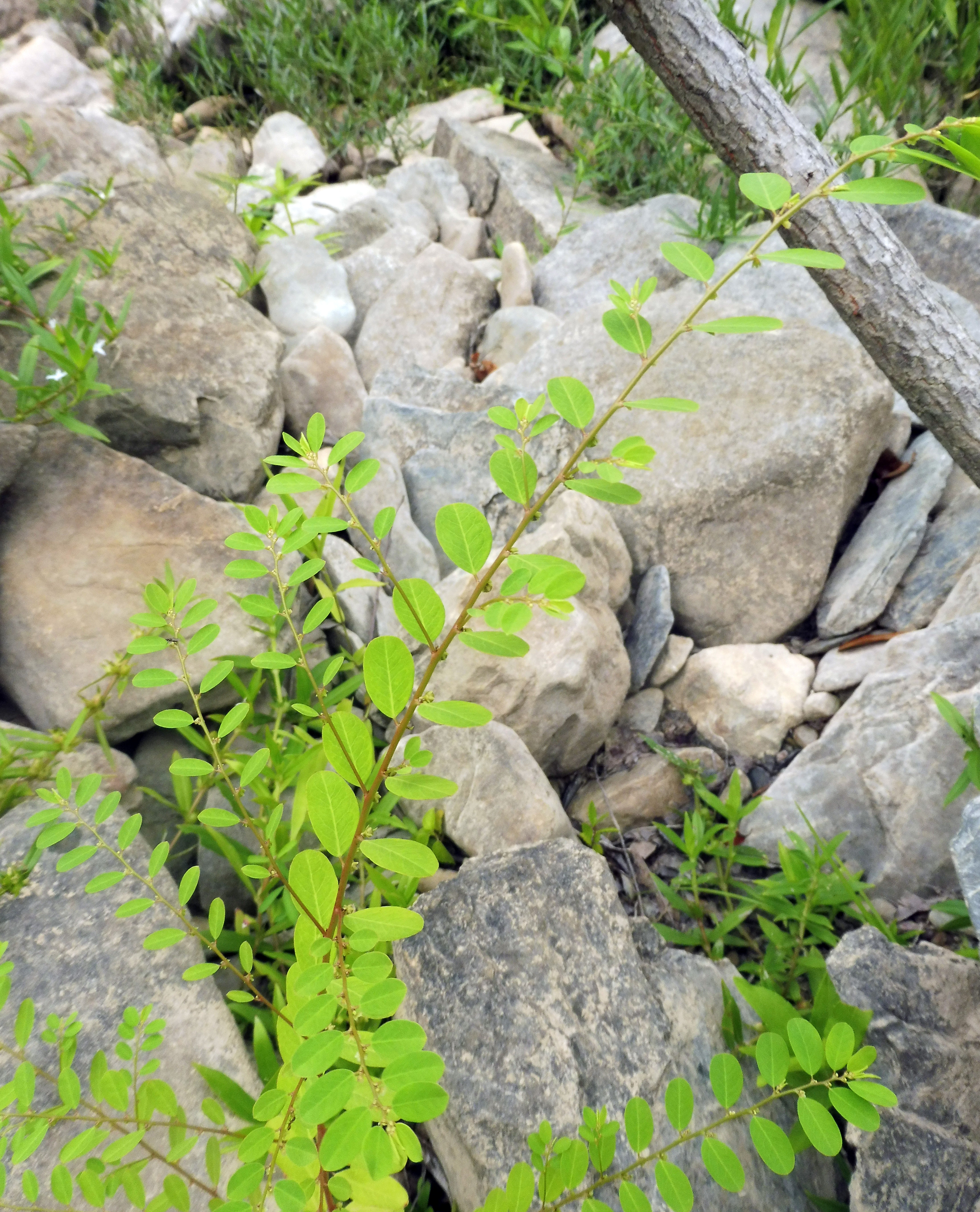

Scientific classification
- Kingdom: Plantae
- Clade: Tracheophytes
- Clade: Angiosperms
- Clade: Eudicots
- Clade: Rosids
- Order: Malpighiales
- Family: Phyllanthaceae
- Genus: Phyllanthus
- Species: P. caroliniensis

Binomial name
- Phyllanthus caroliniensis Walter

= Phyllanthus caroliniensis =

Species of flowering plant

Phyllanthus caroliniensis, the Carolina leafflower, is a flowering plant native to the Americas, from the southeastern United States all the way to Argentina. The flowers are small and located where the leaf meets the stem.

This plant is extremely widely distributed in the New World. In the United States it grows in open, moist areas, sometimes in association with disturbance, such as the edges of lakes, ponds, and streams, forest openings, and depressions in grasslands. It has been reported from Alabama, Arkansas, Delaware, Washington, D.C., Florida, Georgia, Illinois, Indiana, Kansas, Kentucky, Louisiana, Maryland, Mississippi, Missouri, New Jersey, North Carolina, Ohio, Oklahoma, Pennsylvania, South Carolina, Tennessee, Texas, Virginia, and West Virginia; in most of these areas it is the only native species of Phyllanthus. It was also recently collected in San Diego, California, where it has been introduced and may become established.
