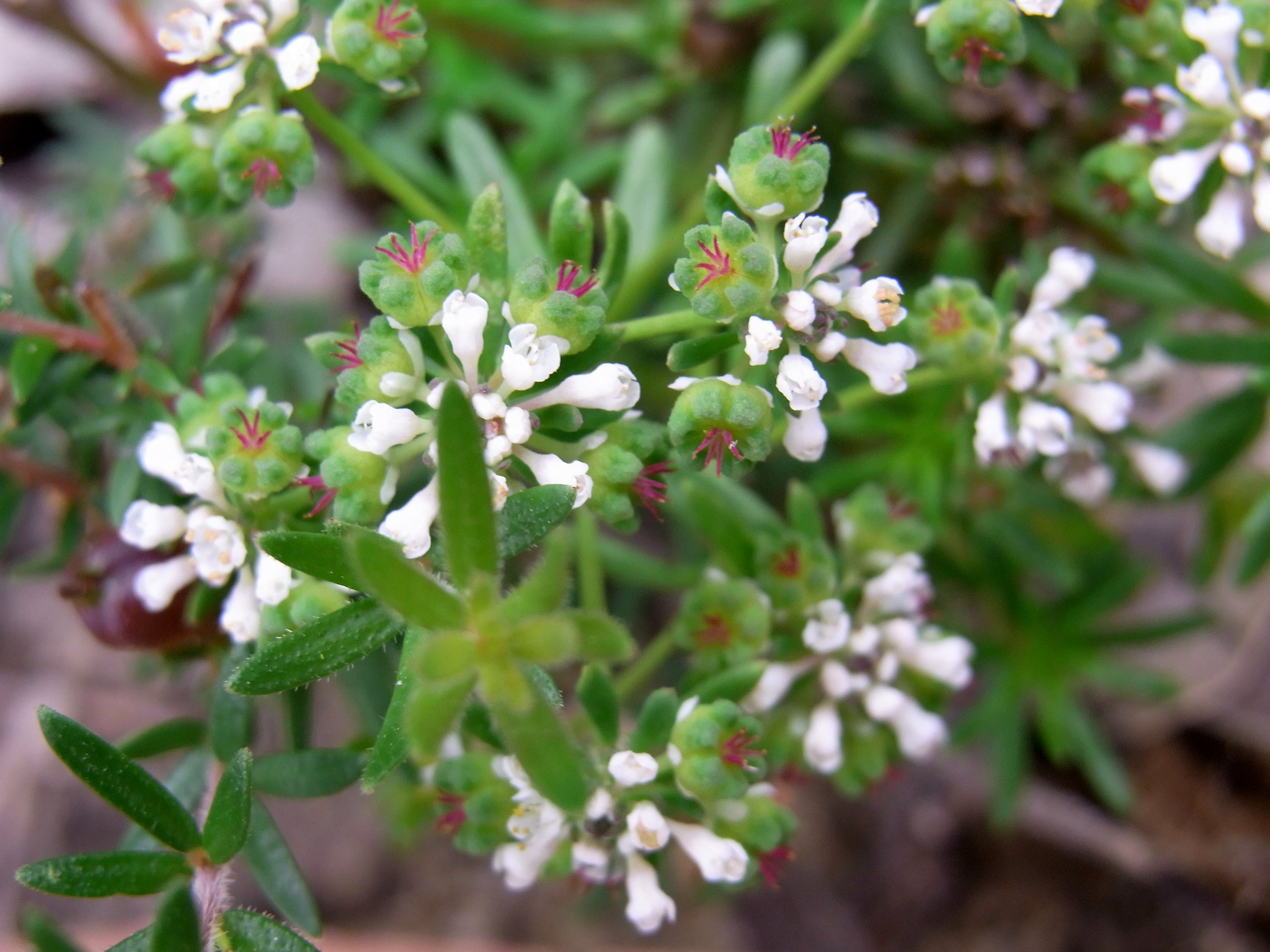
- Ku-ring-gai Chase National Park, Australia

Scientific classification
- Kingdom: Plantae
- Clade: Tracheophytes
- Clade: Angiosperms
- Clade: Eudicots
- Clade: Rosids
- Order: Malpighiales
- Family: Phyllanthaceae
- Genus: Poranthera
- Species: P. ericifolia

Binomial name
- Poranthera ericifolia Rudge

= Poranthera ericifolia =

Species of plant

Poranthera ericifolia is a small shrub growing from 15 to 30 cm high. Usually found in heath country or dry eucalyptus areas on sandstone in the state of New South Wales, in Australia. The specific epithet ericifolia refers to the resemblance of the foliage to those in the Erica group.
