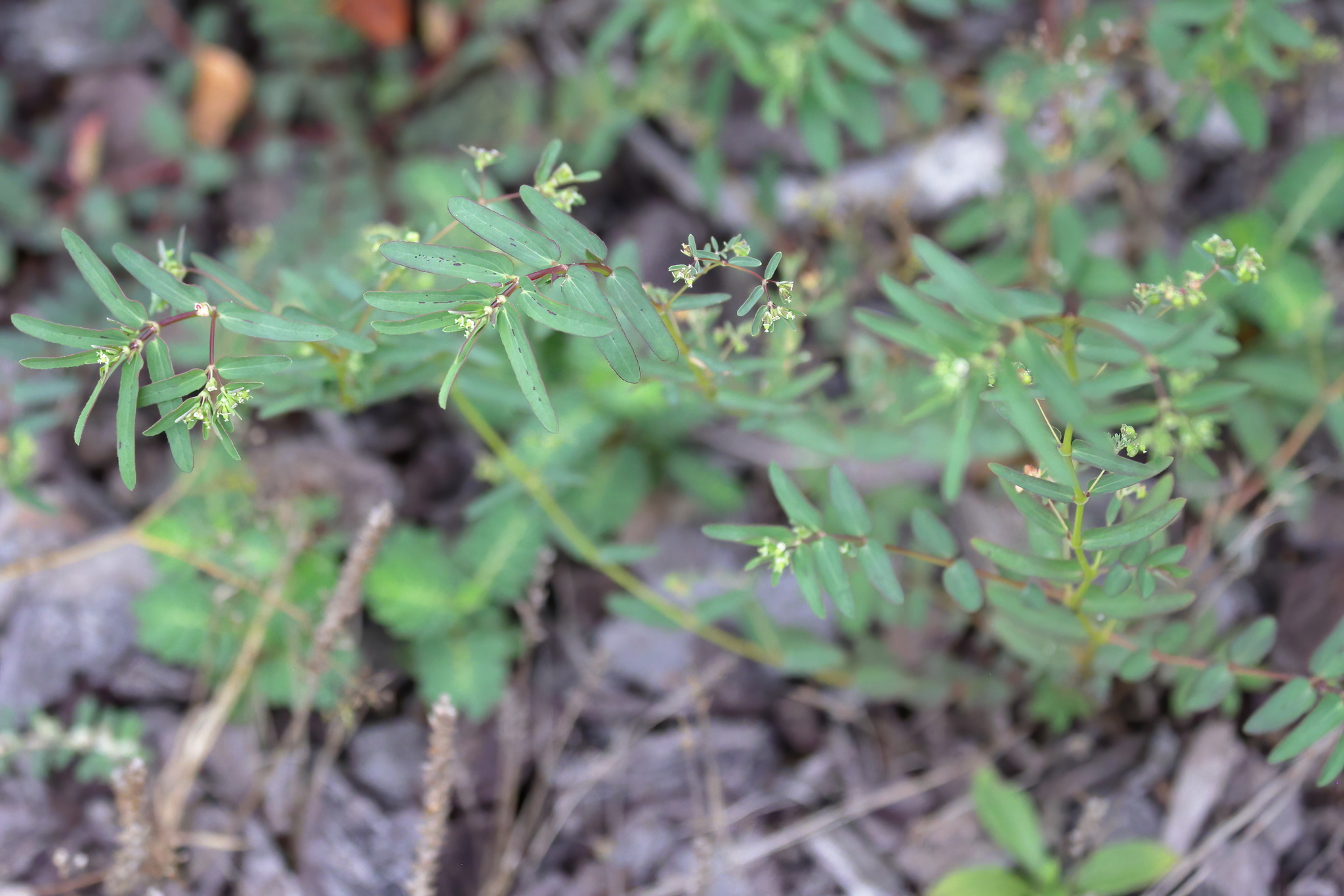

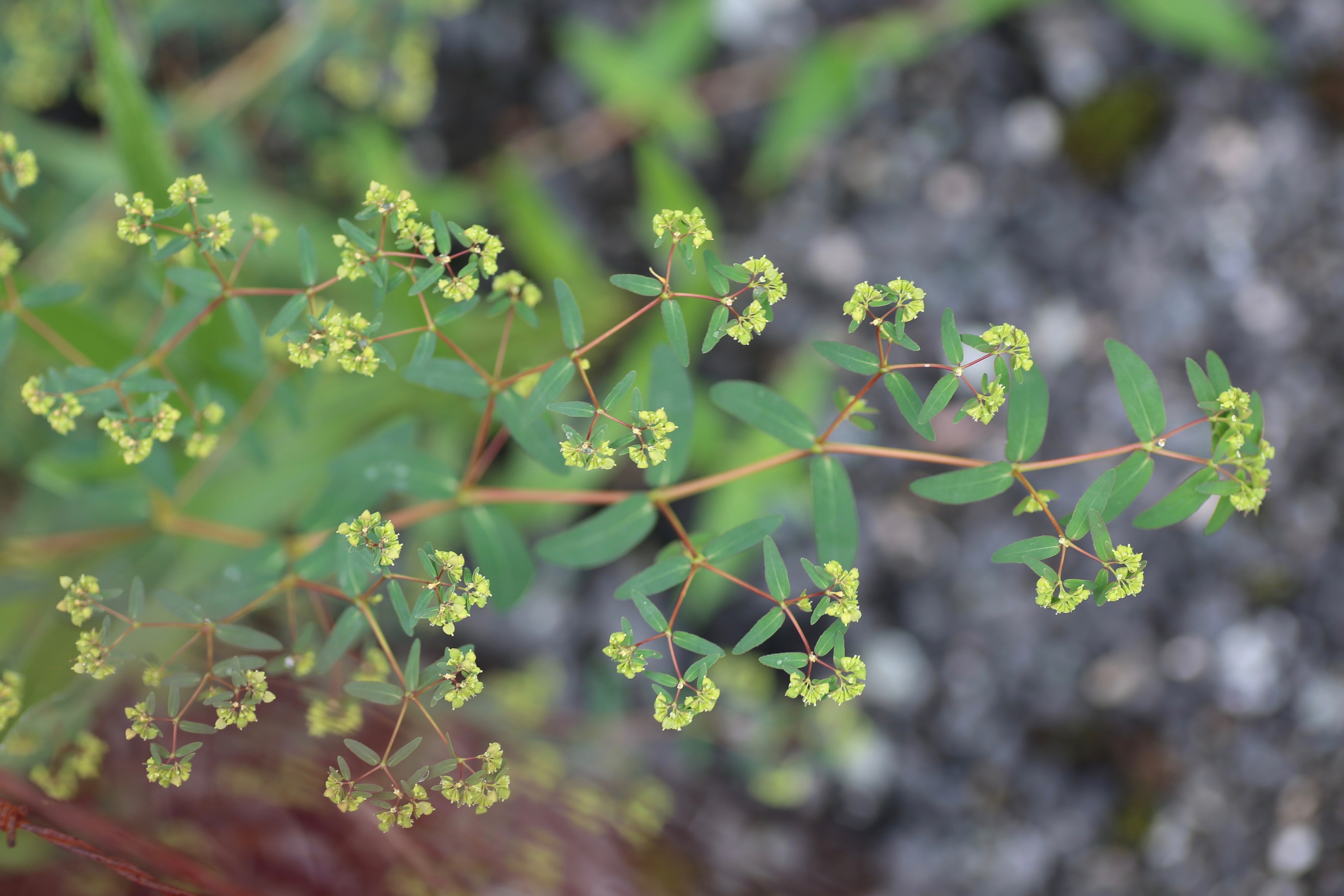

Scientific classification
- Kingdom: Plantae
- Clade: Tracheophytes
- Clade: Angiosperms
- Clade: Eudicots
- Clade: Rosids
- Order: Malpighiales
- Family: Euphorbiaceae
- Genus: Euphorbia
- Species: E. hyssopifolia

Binomial name
- Euphorbia hyssopifolia L. (1759)

Synonyms
- Anisophyllum hyssopifolium (L.) Haw. (1812); Chamaesyce hyssopifolia (L.) Small (1905); Chamaesyce brasiliensis (Lam.) Small (1903); Chamaesyce jenningsii Millsp. ex Britton (1916); Chamaesyce jonesii (Millsp.) Millsp. (1916); Chamaesyce nirurioides Millsp. (1914); Euphorbia blanchetii Miq. ex Boiss. (1850); Euphorbia brasiliensis Lam. (1788); Euphorbia brasiliensis var. hyssopifolia (L.) Boiss. (1862); Euphorbia domingensis Spreng. ex Boiss. (1862); Euphorbia hypericifolia var. falciformis Klotzsch (1843); Euphorbia jonesii Millsp. (1890); Euphorbia klotzschiana Miq. (1851); Euphorbia nirurioides (Millsp.) (1920); Euphorbia pulchella Kunth (1817); Euphorbia serrulata Vell. (1829); Euphorbia stenomeres S.F.Blake (1922)

= Euphorbia hyssopifolia =

Hyssopleaf sandmat

Species of plant

Euphorbia hyssopifolia, known by the common name of hyssopleaf sandmat in English and hierba de pollo ("chicken grass") in Spanish, is a member of the spurge family, Euphorbiaceae. It is an annual herb, native to Central and South America and the Southeastern United States. It has also been introduced to west Tropical Africa, India, and Australia.

== Description ==
Arching annual to 80 cm with leaf-bases oblique. Flowers and fruits in small loose clusters. Because it is rather confusable with the usually slightly hairier E. nutans, fruit capsules should always be opened for seeds. The seeds are cross-ridged and rather square-edged in comparison to the more irregular rounder-edged seeds of E. nutans.

Seeds: "brown to grayish white, ovoid, slightly 4-angled in cross section, abaxial faces convex, adaxial faces slightly concave to slightly convex, 1–1.4 × 0.7–1.1 mm, with 2–3 prominent transverse ridges that do not interrupt adaxial keel, or coarsely and inconspicuously pitted-reticulate." FNA (see also FNA nutans)
