= Phyllanthopsis arida =

Scientific classification
- Kingdom: Plantae
- Clade: Tracheophytes
- Clade: Angiosperms
- Clade: Eudicots
- Clade: Rosids
- Order: Malpighiales
- Family: Phyllanthaceae
- Genus: Phyllanthopsis
- Species: P. arida

Binomial name
- Phyllanthopsis arida (Warnock & M.C.Johnst.) Voronts. & Petra Hoffm.

Synonyms
- Andrachne arida (Warnock & M.C.Johnst.) G.L.Webster; Savia arida Warnock & M.C. Johnst.

Species of flowering plant

Phyllanthopsis arida, the trans-Pecos maidenbush, is a rare plant species endemic to western Texas.

Phyllanthopsis arida is a thornless, dioecious, deciduous, highly branching shrub up to 100 cm tall. Leaves are ovate to obovate, up to 1.0 cm long. Flower solitary or in small clusters, yellow-green, up to 3 mm in diameter. Capsule is hanging, up to 7 mm long.
