= Didymocistus =

Scientific classification
- Kingdom: Plantae
- Clade: Tracheophytes
- Clade: Angiosperms
- Clade: Eudicots
- Clade: Rosids
- Order: Malpighiales
- Family: Phyllanthaceae
- Subfamily: Antidesmatoideae
- Tribe: Antidesmateae
- Subtribe: Hymenocardiinae
- Genus: Didymocistus; Kuhlm.
- Species: D. chrysadenius

Binomial name
- Didymocistus chrysadenius Kuhlm.

Genus of flowering plants

Didymocistus is a genus of plants in the family Phyllanthaceae first described as a genus in 1940. It contains only one known species, Didymocistus chrysadenius, native to the Loreto region of northeastern Peru, the Amazonas Department of southeastern Colombia, and the State of Amazonas in northwestern Brazil. It is dioecious, with male and female flowers on separate plants.
