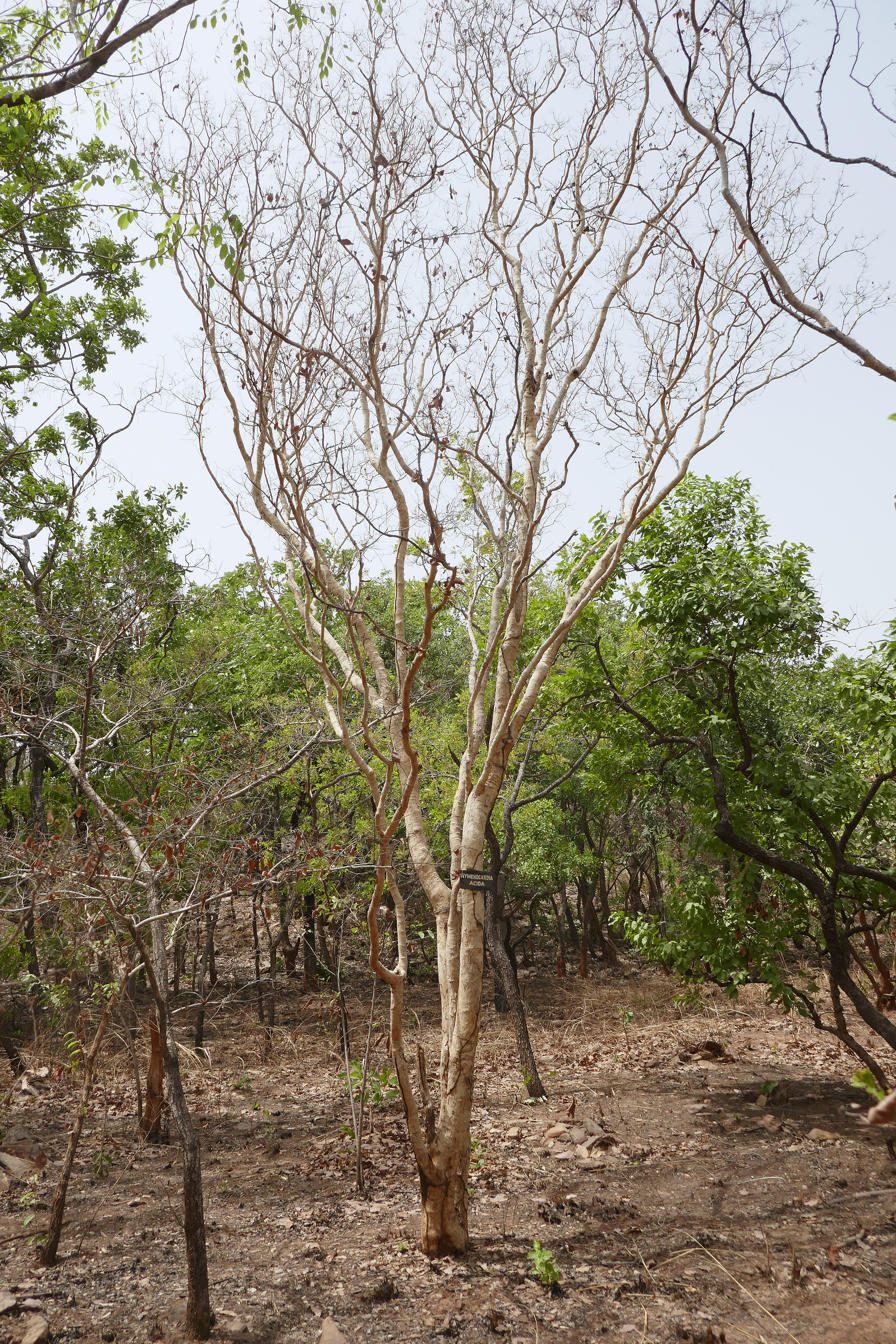
- Hymenocardia acida

Scientific classification
- Kingdom: Plantae
- Clade: Tracheophytes
- Clade: Angiosperms
- Clade: Eudicots
- Clade: Rosids
- Order: Malpighiales
- Family: Phyllanthaceae
- Subfamily: Antidesmatoideae
- Tribe: Antidesmateae
- Subtribe: Hymenocardiinae
- Genus: Hymenocardia; Wall. ex Lindl.

Synonyms
- Samaropyxis Miq.

= Hymenocardia =

Genus of flowering plants

Hymenocardia is a genus of trees in the family Phyllanthaceae first described as a genus in 1836. Most of the species are native to Africa, with one in Southeast Asia.

Species in this genus are dioecious, with male and female flowers on separate plants.

Species

1. Hymenocardia acida - from Gambia to Ethiopia to Mozambique
2. Hymenocardia heudelotii - W + C Africa
3. Hymenocardia lyrata - W Africa
4. Hymenocardia punctata - Mishmi Hills, Indochina, W Malaysia, Sumatra
5. Hymenocardia ripicola - Cameroon, RotC, DRC
6. Hymenocardia ulmoides - C + E + S Africa

formerly included

moved to Mallotus

- Hymenocardia plicata - Mallotus plicatus
