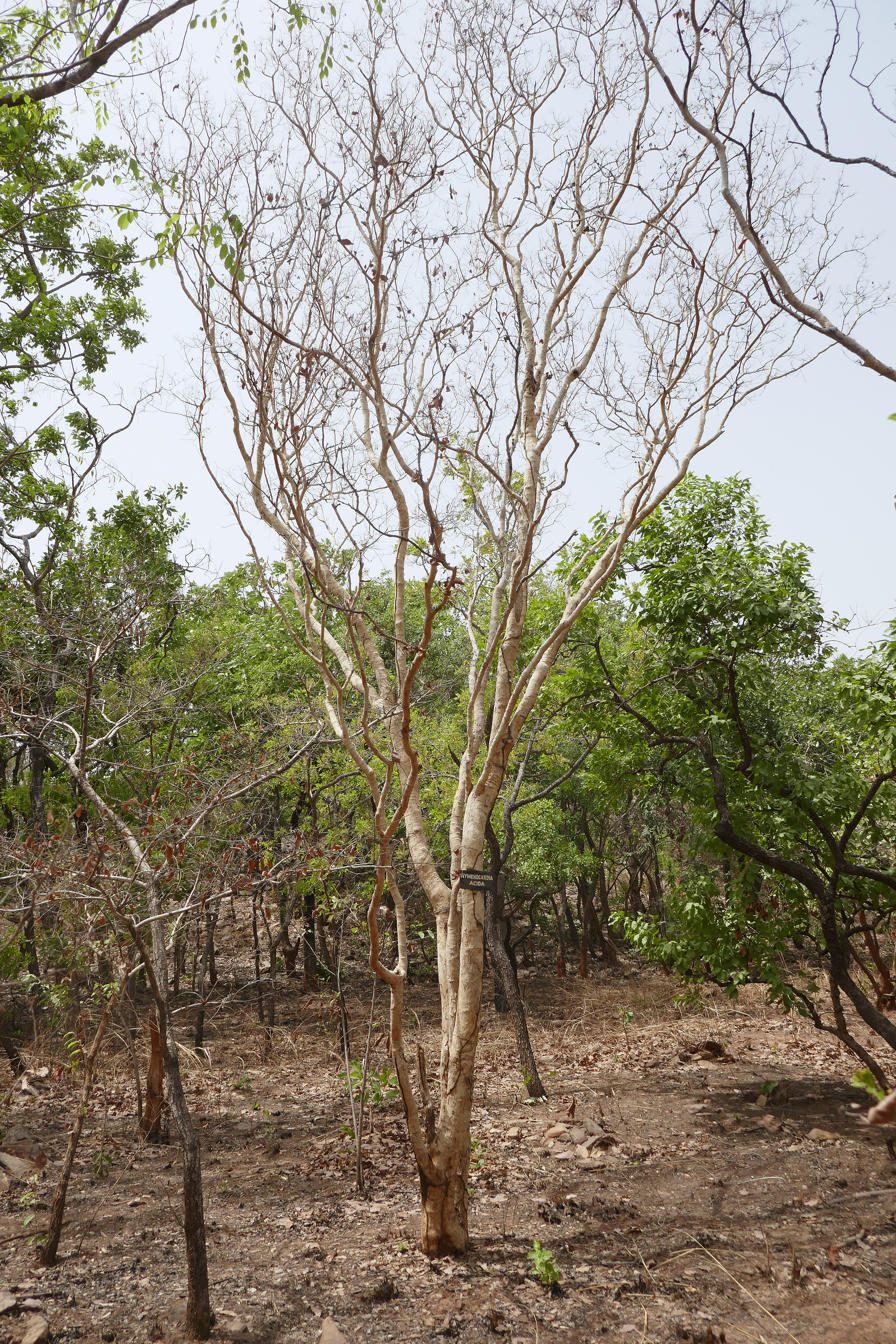

Scientific classification
- Kingdom: Plantae
- Clade: Tracheophytes
- Clade: Angiosperms
- Clade: Eudicots
- Clade: Rosids
- Order: Malpighiales
- Family: Phyllanthaceae
- Genus: Hymenocardia
- Species: H. acida

Binomial name
- Hymenocardia acida Tul.

= Hymenocardia acida =

Species of tree

Hymenocardia acida is a plant of the family Phyllanthaceae native to tropical Africa. It is a small tree that grows to 10 m tall. Occurs in the Guinea and Sudanian savannah zones and deciduous woodland, from Senegal eastwards to Ethiopia and southwards reaching Zimbabwe.

== Description ==
A dioecious and deciduous species, the trunk is often short up to 30 cm in diameter, while the bark is commonly smooth, pale brown to grey in color, flakes off to reveal a powdery reddish to orange inner bark. The leaves are alternate, simple in arrangement with stipules that are up to 3 mm long; leaf-blade is elliptic to oblong in outline up to 9.5 cm long and 5 cm wide, and a coriaceous surface with golden to orange scales beneath. Male flowers are reddish to yellow in color, and appears in axillary clusters of spikes up to 9 cm long. Female flower are green and in a terminal raceme.

== Chemistry ==
The Cyclopeptide alkaloid, hymenocardine has been isolated from the stem bark extract of the tree. Leaf extracts identified the presence of the chemical compound lupeol.

== Uses ==
In traditional medical practice, some communities use leaf and root extracts as part of a regimen to treat malaria, inflammatory related ailments and pain, and various extracts of the plant is used to aid the healing process from skin ailments.
