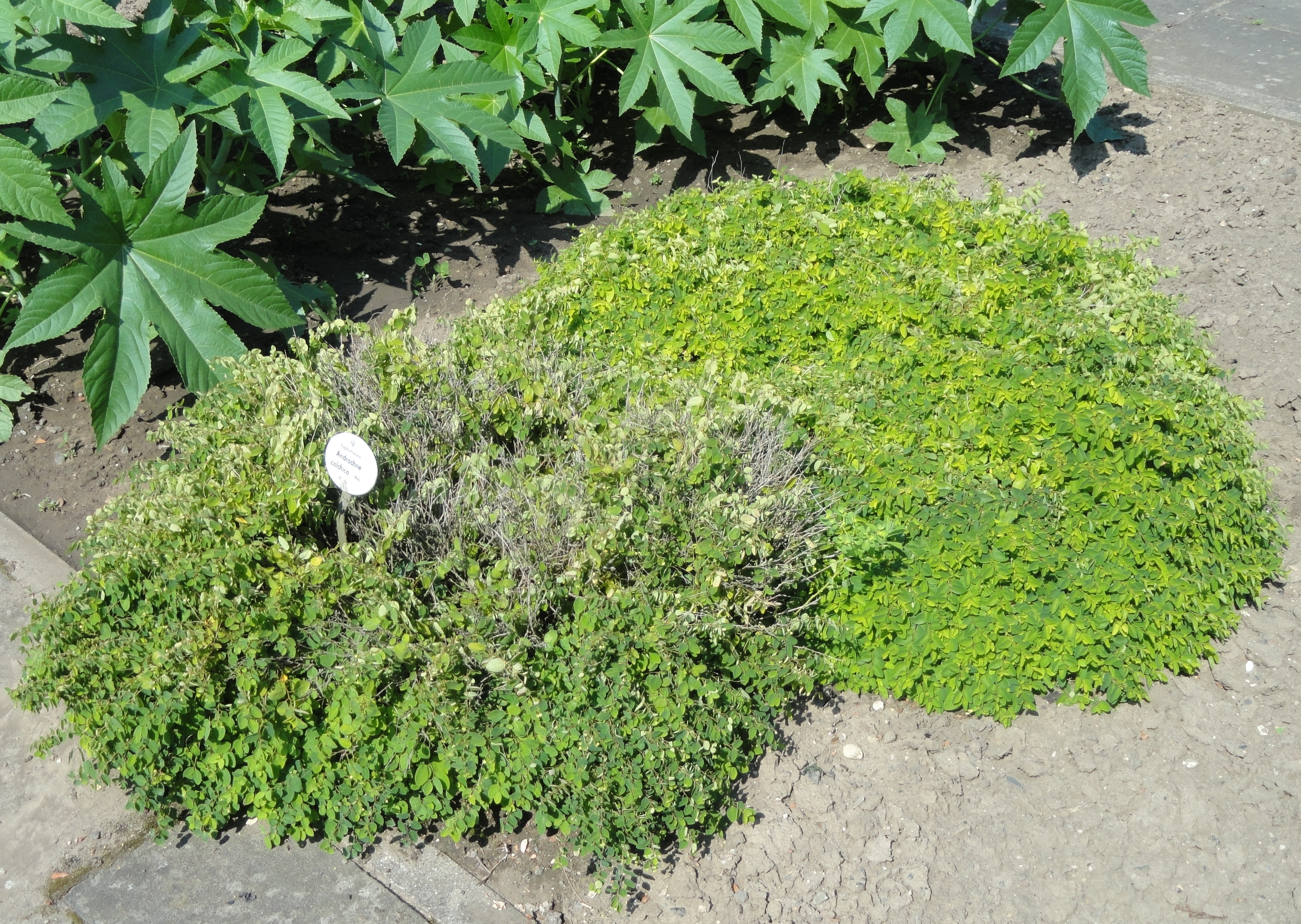

Scientific classification
- Kingdom: Plantae
- Clade: Tracheophytes
- Clade: Angiosperms
- Clade: Eudicots
- Clade: Rosids
- Order: Malpighiales
- Family: Phyllanthaceae
- Genus: Leptopus
- Species: L. chinensis

Binomial name
- Leptopus chinensis (Bunge) Pojark.

= Leptopus chinensis =

Species of flowering plant

Leptopus chinensis is a species of plant belonging to the family Phyllanthaceae.

It is native to Caucasus to Northern Iran, Northern Pakistan, China to Northern Myanmar.

Synonym:

- Andrachne colchica Fisch. & C.A.Mey. ex Boiss.
