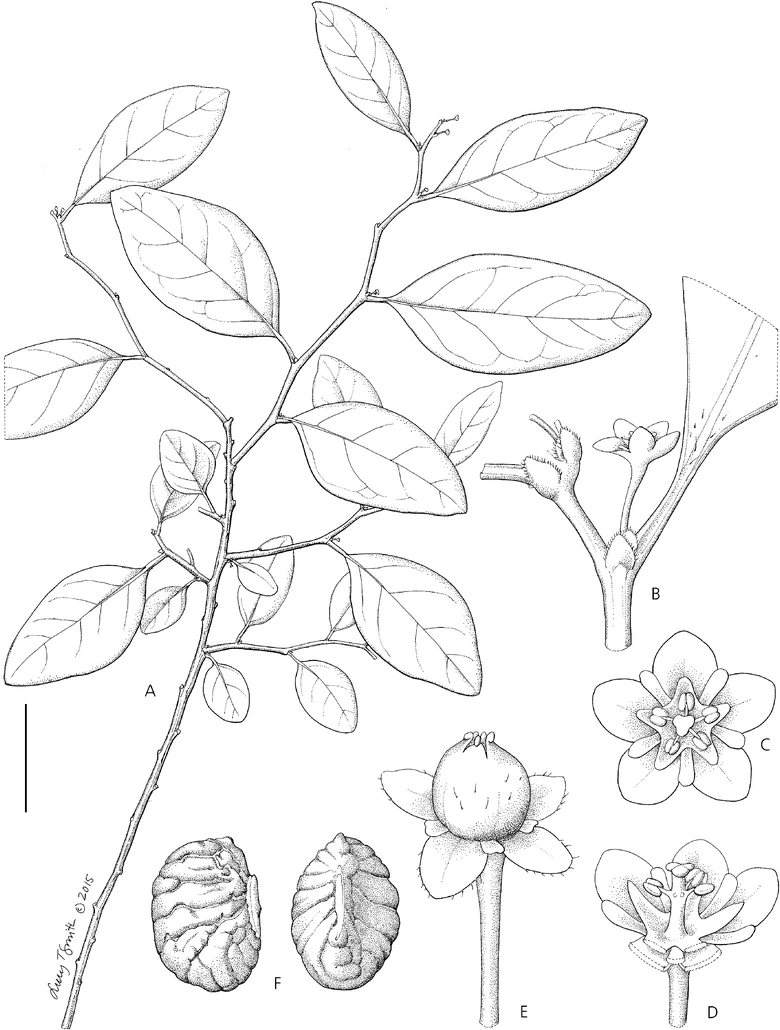
- Illustration of Meineckia nusbaumeri

Scientific classification
- Kingdom: Plantae
- Clade: Tracheophytes
- Clade: Angiosperms
- Clade: Eudicots
- Clade: Rosids
- Order: Malpighiales
- Family: Phyllanthaceae
- Subfamily: Phyllanthoideae
- Tribe: Poranthereae
- Genus: Meineckia; Baill.

Type species
- Meineckia phyllanthoides Baill.

Synonyms
- Peltandra Wight; Cluytiandra Müll.Arg.; Zimmermannia Pax; Neopeltandra Gamble; Zimmermanniopsis Radcl.-Sm.

= Meineckia =

Genus of flowering plants

Meineckia is a genus of flowering plants in the family Phyllanthaceae first described as a genus in 1858.

Meineckia is one of eight genera in the tribe Poranthereae. They are native to the Americas, South Asia, Africa, and Madagascar. The genus is particularly well represented in Madagascar. Species of Meineckia may be monoecious or dioecious. They are trees or shrubs, or rarely, they are subherbaceous.

Species

- Meineckia acuminata – Morogoro
- Meineckia baronii – NW Madagascar
- Meineckia bartlettii – Jalisco, Chiapas, Belize, Honduras
- Meineckia calycina – Anamalai Hills
- Meineckia capillipes – Guatemala, Honduras
- Meineckia cerebroides – SE Madagascar
- Meineckia decaryi – Madagascar
- Meineckia filipes – Socotra
- Meineckia fruticans – Kenya, Tanzania
- Meineckia gracilipes – SE Madagascar
- Meineckia grandiflora – Ulanga, Lindi
- Meineckia humbertii – SW Madagascar
- Meineckia leandrii – W Madagascar
- Meineckia longipes – SW India
- Meineckia macropus – Mishmi Hills
- Meineckia madagascariensis – E Madagascar
- Meineckia neogranatensis – Nicaragua, Colombia, Brazil
- Meineckia nusbaumeri – Madagascar
- Meineckia nguruensis – Nguru
- Meineckia orientalis – E Madagascar
- Meineckia ovata – Teita
- Meineckia parvifolia – S India, Sri Lanka
- Meineckia paxii – Lushoto
- Meineckia peltata – Madagascar
- Meineckia phyllanthoides – C + E Africa, Oman, Yemen
- Meineckia pubiflora – SW Madagascar
- Meineckia ranirisonii – Madagascar
- Meineckia stipularis – Tanzania
- Meineckia trichogynis – Madagascar
- Meineckia uzungwaensis – Mufindi
- Meineckia vestita – Tanzania
- Meineckia websteri – Madagascar

== Circumscription ==
The circumscription of Meineckia has undergone several changes since Henri Ernest Baillon erected the genus in 1858. Some of its species have been put in other genera and sometimes other genera have been merged with it. The name Peltandra had been used for some species in Meineckia, but this is now a nomen rejectum. The name Peltandra is now conserved as the name of a genus in Araceae.

Meineckia was last revised in 2008 by Vorontsova and Hoffmann. They recognized 30 species and divided the genus into two subgenera.

Meineckia subgenus Petaliferae has only two species: its type species, Meineckia cerebroides, and Meineckia gracilipes. They are dioecious shrubs from Madagascar. Their petals are very small.

Meineckia subgenus Meineckia has 28 species. Its type species, Meineckia phyllanthoides, is the same as that of the genus. They are monoecious or dioecious trees or shrubs, or sometimes, subherbaceous. Their flowers have no petals. This subgenus is the only completely apetalous taxon in the tribe Poranthereae.

Vorontsova and Hoffmann did not recognize Zimmermannia and Zimmermanniopsis as separate genera, but placed their species in Meineckia subgenus Meineckia.
