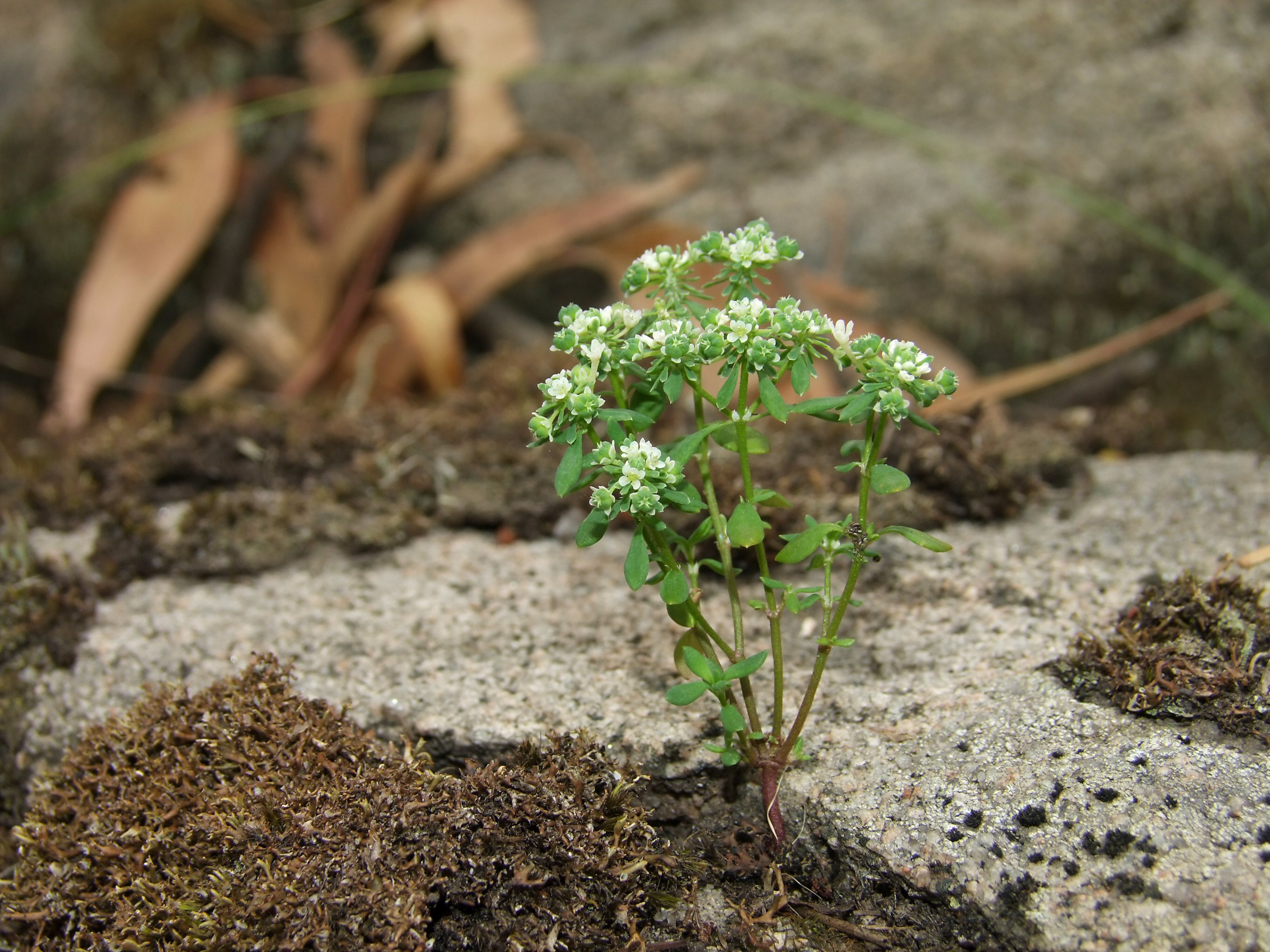
- Poranthera microphylla

Scientific classification
- Kingdom: Plantae
- Clade: Tracheophytes
- Clade: Angiosperms
- Clade: Eudicots
- Clade: Rosids
- Order: Malpighiales
- Family: Phyllanthaceae
- Subfamily: Phyllanthoideae
- Tribe: Poranthereae
- Genus: Poranthera; Rudge 1811 not Raf. 1830 (syn of Sorghastrum in Poaceae)

Type species
- Poranthera ericifolia Rudge

Synonyms
- Oreoporanthera (Grüning) Hutch

= Poranthera =

Genus of flowering plants

Poranthera is a genus of flowering plant belonging to the family Phyllanthaceae first described as a genus in 1811.

It is one of eight genera in the tribe Poranthereae. Its closest relative is Pseudophyllanthus.

Poranthera is native to Australia and New Zealand. The name is derived from the Greek word, poros, "opening or pore", and the Latin word anthera, "anther".

Poranthera consists of monoecious or rarely, dioecious annual or perennial herbs. On the anthers, the line of dehiscence does not extend beyond the apex. It does not have the clearly round pores that define truly poricidal dehiscence.

Poranthera alpina has been placed in the monospecific genus Oreoporanthera by some authors, but in 2007, a molecular phylogenetic analysis of matK and ITS sequences showed this species to be embedded in Poranthera.

Species

1. Poranthera alpina Cheeseman ex Hooker f. - S NZ
2. Poranthera coerulea O.Schwarz - N WA, N NT
3. Poranthera corymbosa Brongn. - SE Qld, NSW, Vic
4. Poranthera dissecta Halford & R.J.F. Hend. - S WA
5. Poranthera drummondii Klotzsch - W + SW WA
6. Poranthera ericifolia Rudge - E NSW
7. Poranthera ericoides Klotzsch - SW WA
8. Poranthera florosa Halford & R.J.F.Hend. - S WA
9. Poranthera huegelii Klotzsch - S WA, SE SA
10. Poranthera leiosperma Halford & R.J.F.Hend. - WA, SA, NSW, Vic, NT
11. Poranthera microphylla Brongn. - Australia (all 7 parts), S NZ
12. Poranthera obovata Halford & R.J.F.Hend. - Qld, NSW
13. Poranthera oreophila Halford & R.J.F.Hend. - NSW, Vic
14. Poranthera petalifera (Orchard & J.B.Davies) Halford & R.J.F.Hend. - SW Tas
15. Poranthera triandra J.M.Black - WA, SA, Vic, NT

names in Poaceae

In 1830, Rafinesque used the name Poranthera to refer to a very different plant than that to which Rudge had already applied the name. Thus he created an illegitimate homonym. Species names coined using Rafinesque's homonym:

1. Poranthera ciliata - Sorghastrum nutans
2. Poranthera nutans - Sorghastrum nutans
