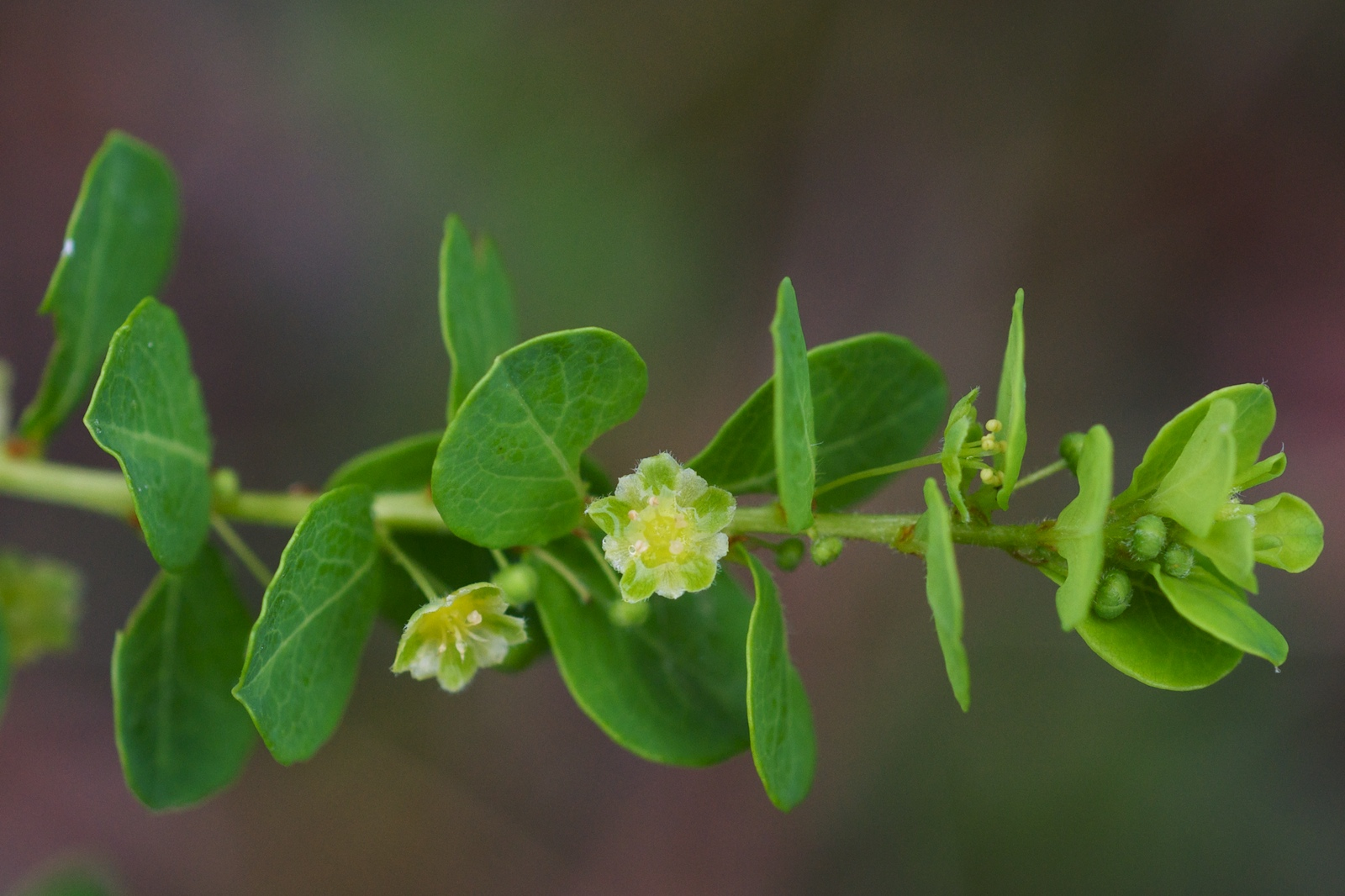
- Staminate flowers

Scientific classification
- Kingdom: Plantae
- Clade: Tracheophytes
- Clade: Angiosperms
- Clade: Eudicots
- Clade: Rosids
- Order: Malpighiales
- Family: Phyllanthaceae
- Genus: Phyllanthopsis
- Species: P. phyllanthoides

Binomial name
- Phyllanthopsis phyllanthoides (Nutt.) Voronts. & Petra Hoffm.

Synonyms
- Andrachne phyllanthoides (Nutt.) Müll.Arg. Lepidanthus phyllanthoides Nutt. Leptopus phyllanthoides (Nutt.) G.L.Webster

= Phyllanthopsis phyllanthoides =

Species of flowering plant

Phyllanthopsis phyllanthoides, commonly called buckbrush or maidenbush, is a flowering plant in the family Phyllanthaceae. It is native to Mexico (where it is found in Nuevo León) and the United States (where it is found primarily South Central region). Its natural habitat is on limestone or dolomite rock outcrops, particularly in seepy shelves along rivers, but also in upland areas such as glades and bluffs.

== Description ==
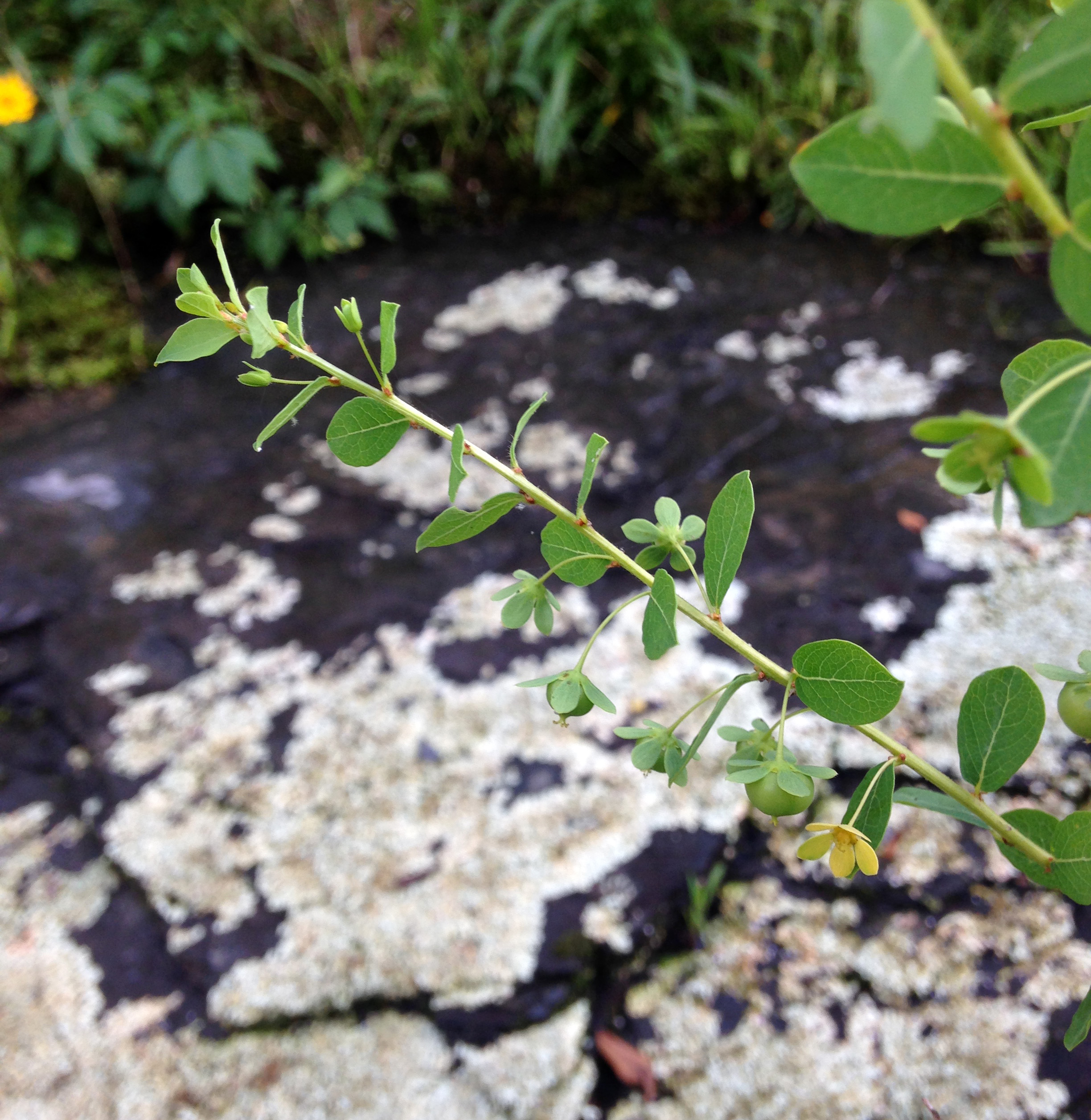
Pistillate flowers and maturing fruit

Phyllanthopsis phyllanthoides is a shrub, growing up to three or four feet tall. It has entire, opposite, deciduous leaves. It is monoecious, although individuals often appear as if they are male or female. Flowers are produced from May to September. Its fruit is a capsule reaching up to 6.5 mm in diameter.
