= Maria Vorontsova (botanist) =

Russian-born botanist (born 1979)

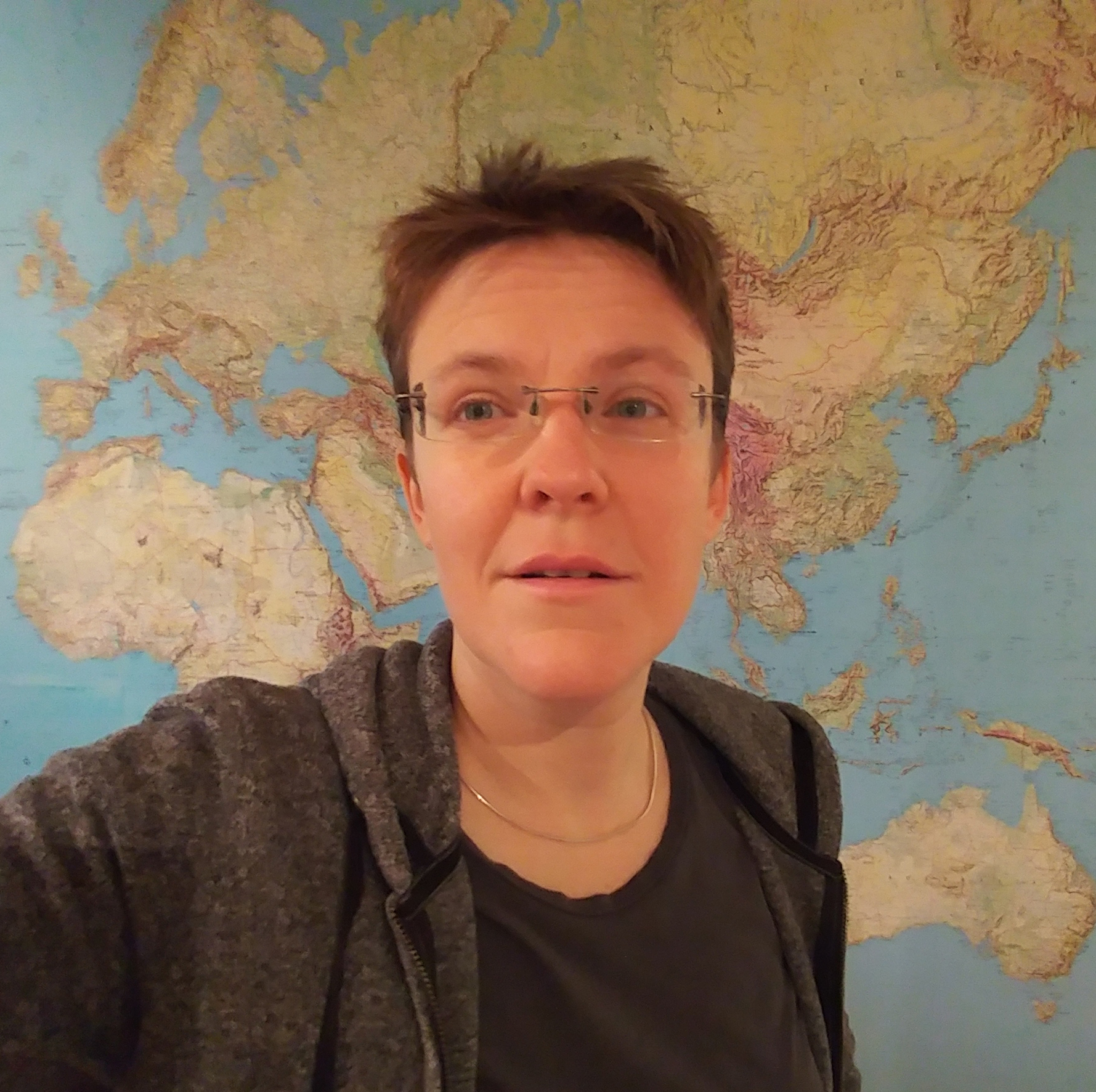
- Born: 1979 (age 46–47)
- Education: University of Cambridge; Open University
- Known for: Poaceae
- Scientific career
- Fields: Botany
- Thesis: (2008)
- Author abbrev. (botany): Voronts.

Maria Sergeevna Vorontsova (Russian: Мария Сергеевна Воронцова; born 1979) is a Russian-born botanist, specializing in the taxonomy of Poaceae (grasses). She was responsible for authoring the taxon for Solanum agnewiorum and Solanum umtuma. She is a member of the Accelerated Taxonomy department at Royal Botanic Gardens, Kew. She is one of the co-authors and maintainers of GrassBase, and is an editor of the journal, Phytotaxa.

In 2010, she identified a new species of Africa spiny aubergine, Solanum ruvu, which had been collected only once in the wild ten years earlier. A subsequent expedition failed to locate it, and it is now believed to be extinct due to deforestation.

== Publications ==
- Lundgren, Marjorie R.; Besnard, Guillaume; Ripley, Brad S.; Lehmann, Caroline E. R.; Chatelet, David S.; Kynast, Ralf G.; Namaganda, Mary; Vorontsova, Maria S.; Hall, Russell C.; Elia, John; Osborne, Colin P.; Christin, Pascal-Antoine (October 2015). "Photosynthetic innovation broadens the niche within a single species" (PDF). Ecology Letters. 18 (10): 1021–1029. Bibcode:2015EcolL..18.1021L. doi:10.1111/ele.12484. PMID 26248677.
- Vorontsova, Maria S.; Christenhusz, Maarten J. M.; Kirika, Paul; Muthoka, Patrick (1 December 2010). "Three New Species of Solanum from Kenya: Using Herbarium Specimens to Document Environmental Change". Systematic Botany. 35 (4): 894–906. doi:10.1600/036364410X539943. S2CID 85397166.
- Vorontsova, Maria A.; Clayton, Derek; Simon, Bryan K. (15 April 2015). "Grassroots e-floras in the Poaceae: growing GrassBase and GrassWorld". PhytoKeys (48): 73–84. doi:10.3897/phytokeys.48.7159. PMC 4408733. PMID 25941449.
- Trias-Blasi, Anna; Vorontsova, Maria (May 2015). "Plant identification is key to conservation". Nature. 521 (7551): 161. doi:10.1038/521161c. PMID 25971502. S2CID 4448411.
