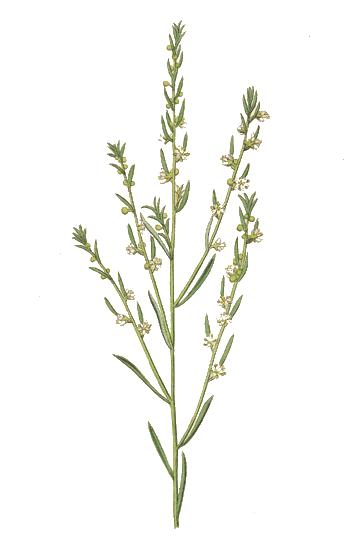
- Clutia ericoides

Scientific classification
- Kingdom: Plantae
- Clade: Tracheophytes
- Clade: Angiosperms
- Clade: Eudicots
- Clade: Rosids
- Order: Malpighiales
- Family: Peraceae
- Genus: Clutia; Boerh. ex L. 1753

Type species
- Clutia pulchella L. 1753

Synonyms
- Altora Adans.; Cluytia Aiton spelling variation; Clytia Stokes spelling variation; Cratochwilia Neck.; Middelbergia Schinz ex Pax

= Clutia =

Genus of flowering plants

Clutia is a plant genus of the family Peraceae. It is native to sub-Saharan Africa and to the Arabian Peninsula.

Species

1. Clutia abyssinica - E + SE + S Africa
2. Clutia affinis - southern Africa
3. Clutia africana - Cape Province
4. Clutia alaternoides - Cape Province
5. Clutia alpina - Cape Province
6. Clutia angustifolia - C + SC Africa
7. Clutia benguelensis - Angola
8. Clutia brassii - Malawi
9. Clutia brevifolia - Cape Province
10. Clutia conferta - Malawi
11. Clutia cordata - Cape Province, KwaZulu-Natal
12. Clutia daphnoides - Cape Province
13. Clutia disceptata - Cape Province, KwaZulu-Natal
14. Clutia dregeana - Cape Province
15. Clutia eckloniana - Cape Province
16. Clutia ericoides - Cape Province
17. Clutia galpinii - Botswana, Limpopo
18. Clutia govaertsii - Cape Province
19. Clutia heterophylla - Cape Province
20. Clutia hirsuta - southern Africa
21. Clutia × hybrida - KwaZulu-Natal
22. Clutia imbricata - Cape Province
23. Clutia impedita - Cape Province
24. Clutia jaubertiana - Yemen
25. Clutia kamerunica - Cameroon
26. Clutia katharinae - Cape Province, KwaZulu-Natal
27. Clutia kilimandscharica - Ethiopia to Zimbabwe
28. Clutia lanceolata - Yemen
29. Clutia laxa - Eswatini, South Africa
30. Clutia marginata - Cape Province
31. Clutia monticola - southern Africa
32. Clutia myricoides - Ethiopia, Yemen, Saudi Arabia
33. Clutia nana - Lesotho, South Africa
34. Clutia natalensis - Lesotho, South Africa
35. Clutia ovalis - Cape Province
36. Clutia paxii - Burundi to Zimbabwe
37. Clutia pentheriana - Cape Province
38. Clutia platyphylla - Cape Province
39. Clutia polifolia - Cape Province
40. Clutia polyadenia - Tanzania
41. Clutia polygonoides - Cape Province
42. Clutia pterogona - Cape Province
43. Clutia pubescens - Cape Province
44. Clutia pulchella - southern Africa
45. Clutia punctata - Zimbabwe
46. Clutia richardiana - Eritrea, Ethiopia, Yemen
47. Clutia rubricaulis - Cape Province
48. Clutia sericea - Cape Province
49. Clutia sessilifolia - Zimbabwe
50. Clutia stuhlmannii - Tanzania, Burundi
51. Clutia swynnertonii - Malawi, Zimbabwe, Mozambique
52. Clutia thunbergii - Cape Province
53. Clutia timpermaniana - Congo
54. Clutia tomentosa - Cape Province
55. Clutia virgata - Eswatini, South Africa
56. Clutia whytei - Tanzania, Malawi, Zambia

formerly included

moved to other genera (Bridelia Cleistanthus Croton Ditaxis Lachnostylis Phyllanthus Pseudophyllanthus Sauropus Trigonostemon )

1. C. acuminata - Lachnostylis hirta
2. C. androgyna - Sauropus androgynus
3. C. berberifolia - Phyllanthus calycinus
4. C. berteroana - Ditaxis polygama
5. C. cascarilla - Croton eluteria
6. C. collina - Cleistanthus collinus
7. C. diversifolia - Cleistanthus diversifolius
8. C. eluteria - Croton eluteria
9. C. hirta - Lachnostylis hirta
10. C. monoica - Cleistanthus monoicus
11. C. oblongifolia - Cleistanthus oblongifolius
12. C. ovalis (E.Mey. ex Sond.) Scheele 1853 not Sond. 1850 - Pseudophyllanthus ovalis
13. C. patula - Cleistanthus patulus
14. C. retusa - Bridelia retusa
15. C. scandens - Bridelia stipularis
16. C. semperflorens - Trigonostemon semperflorens
17. C. sempervirens - Trigonostemon semperflorens
18. C. spinosa - Bridelia retusa
19. C. squamosa - Bridelia retusa
20. C. stipularis - Bridelia stipularis
