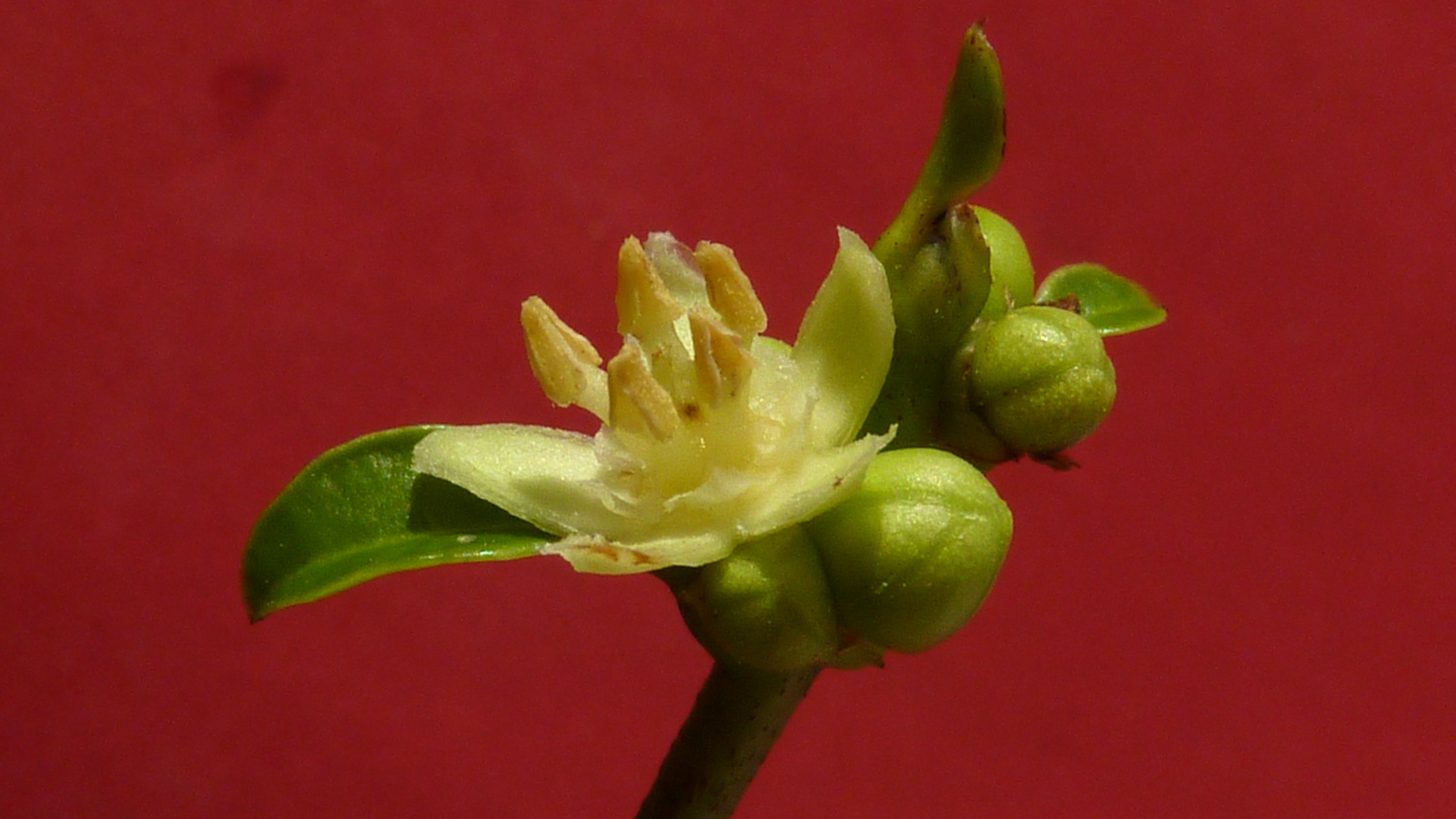
- Amanoa congesta

Scientific classification
- Kingdom: Plantae
- Clade: Tracheophytes
- Clade: Angiosperms
- Clade: Eudicots
- Clade: Rosids
- Order: Malpighiales
- Family: Phyllanthaceae
- Subfamily: Phyllanthoideae
- Tribe: Bridelieae
- Subtribe: Amanoinae
- Genus: Amanoa; Aubl.

Synonyms
- Micropetalum Poit. ex Baill.

= Amanoa =

Genus of flowering plants

See also Queen Amanoa, a fictional character from the Star Wars expanded universe.

Amanoa is a genus in the family Phyllanthaceae, first described as a genus in 1775. It is native to South America, Central America, the West Indies, and tropical Africa.

Species

- Amanoa almerindae Leal – Brazilian Amazonas, Venezuelan Amazonas
- Amanoa anomala Little – Ecuador
- Amanoa bracteosa Planch. – Ivory Coast, Sierra Leone, Liberia
- Amanoa caribaea Krug & Urb. – Guadeloupe, Dominica
- Amanoa condorensis J.L.Clark & D.A.Neill – Ecuador
- Amanoa congesta W.J.Hayden – Amapá, Pará, Fr Guiana
- Amanoa cupatensis Huber – B Amazonas, V Amazonas
- Amanoa glaucophyla Müll.Arg. – Venezuela, Colombia, Brazil
- Amanoa gracillima W.J.Hayden – B Amazonas
- Amanoa grandiflora (Müll.Arg.) Müll.Arg. – Central and South America
- Amanoa guianensis Aubl. – Trinidad, Central America, N South America
- Amanoa marapiensis Secco – Brazil
- Amanoa nanayensis W.J.Hayden – Loreto
- Amanoa oblongifolia Müll.Arg. – from Venezuela to Bolivia
- Amanoa sinuosa W.J.Hayden – Loreto, B Amazonas
- Amanoa steyermarkii Jabl. – Southern Venezuela
- Amanoa strobilacea Müll.Arg. – West and Central Africa
- Amanoa tolimensis Villanueva & Corr.-Bravo – Colombia

Formerly included

moved to other genera: Bridelia Cleistanthus Gonatogyne Pentabrachion Richeria

- A. acuminata – Cleistanthus acuminatus
- A. boiviniana – Cleistanthus boivinianus
- A. brasiliensis – Gonatogyne brasiliensis
- A. chartacea – Cleistanthus oblongifolius
- A. collina – Cleistanthus collinus
- A. cunninghamii – Cleistanthus cunninghamii
- A. dallachyana – Cleistanthus dallachyanus
- A. divaricata – Richeria grandis
- A. faginea – Bridelia leichhardtii
- A. ferruginea – Cleistanthus ferrugineus
- A. indica Wight 1852 – Cleistanthus patulus
- A. indica Thwaites 1864 – Cleistanthus robustus
- A. laurifolia – Pentabrachion reticulatum
- A. leichhardtii – Bridelia leichhardtii
- A. muricata – Esenbeckia almawillia
- A. ovata – Bridelia exaltata
- A. pallida – Cleistanthus pallidus
- A. patula – Cleistanthus patulus
- A. purpurascens – Richeria grandis var. grandis
- A. racemosa – Richeria grandis
- A. ramiflora – Richeria grandis var. grandis
- A. robusta Thwaites 1864 not Leal 1951 – Cleistanthus robustus
- A. schweinfurthii – Erythroxylum fischeri
- A. stenonia – Cleistanthus stenonius
- A. tomentosa – Bridelia tomentosa
