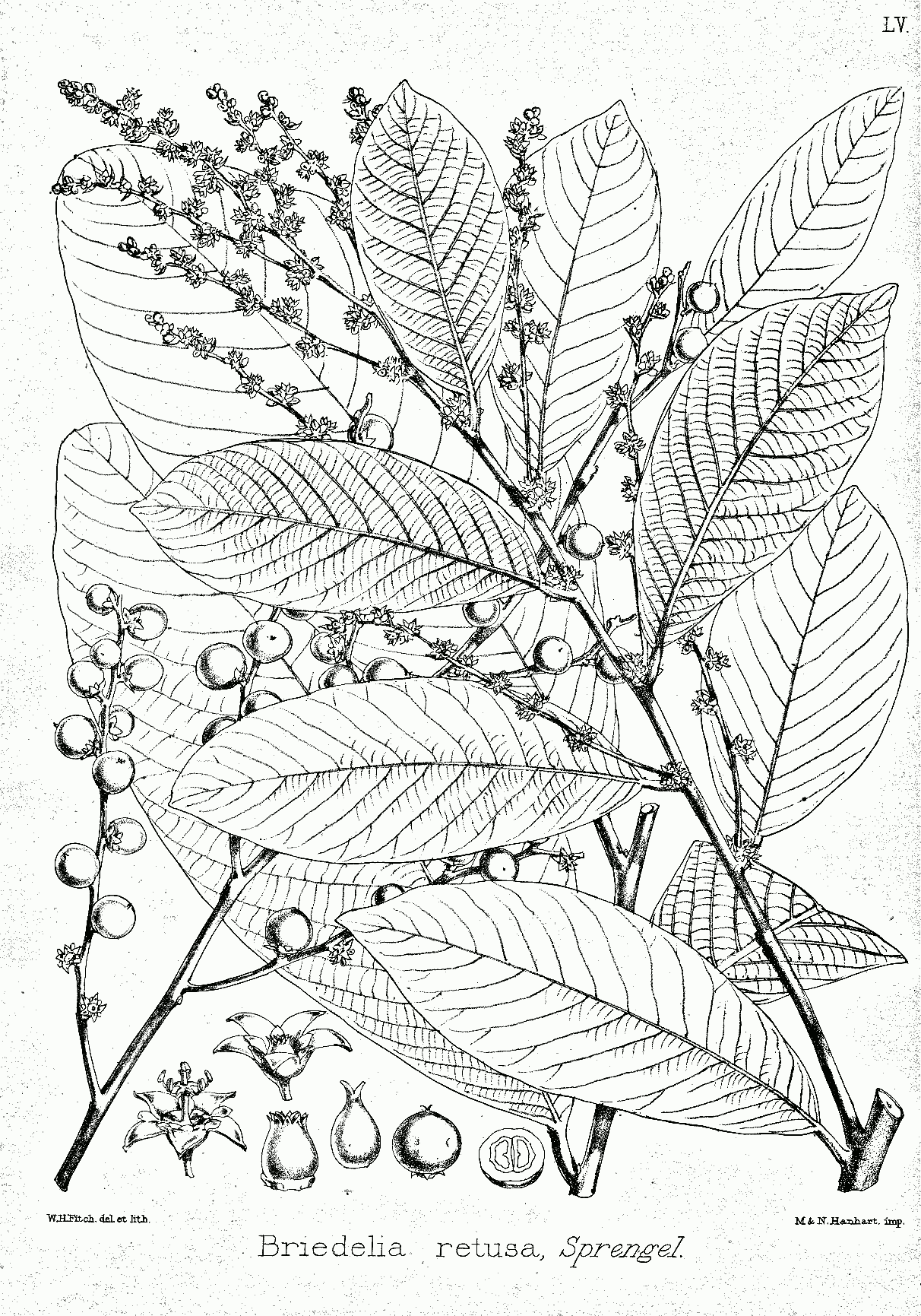
- Bridelia retusa

Scientific classification
- Kingdom: Plantae
- Clade: Tracheophytes
- Clade: Angiosperms
- Clade: Eudicots
- Clade: Rosids
- Order: Malpighiales
- Family: Phyllanthaceae
- Subfamily: Phyllanthoideae
- Tribe: Bridelieae
- Subtribe: Pseudolachnostylidinae
- Genus: Bridelia; Willd.

Synonyms
- Candelabria Hochst.; Gentilia A.Chev. & Beille; Pentameria Klotzsch ex Baill.; Tzellemtinia Chiov.; Neogoetzea Pax

= Bridelia =

Genus of flowering plants

Bridelia is a genus of plants in the family Phyllanthaceae first described as a genus in 1806. It is widespread across Africa, Australia, southern Asia, and various islands of the Indian and Pacific Oceans.

Bridelia species are used as food plants by the larvae of some Lepidoptera species including Endoclita malabaricus.

The genus Bridelia was named in the honor of Samuel Elisée Bridel-Brideri by the German botanist Carl Ludwig Willdenow.

== Species ==
As of February 2023, Plants of the World Online accepted the following species:

- Bridelia adusta – Sarawak, Sabah
- Bridelia affinis – Yunnan, Hainan, Thailand
- Bridelia assamica – Arunachal Pradesh, Assam, Bangladesh
- Bridelia atroviridis – tropical Africa
- Bridelia balansae – Nansei-shoto, S China, Indochina, Taiwan
- Bridelia brideliifolia – E + C + SE Africa
- Bridelia cathartica – C + S Africa
- Bridelia cinnamomea – Andaman Is, S Thailand, Malaysia, W Indonesia
- Bridelia curtisii – Andaman & Nicobar, Indochina, Sumatra
- Bridelia duvigneaudii – C Africa
- Bridelia eranalis – Zaïre
- Bridelia erapensis – Papua New Guinea
- Bridelia exaltata – Queensland, New South Wales
- Bridelia ferruginea – tropical Africa
- Bridelia finalis – Queensland
- Bridelia fordii Hemsl. – S China to Hainan
- Bridelia glauca – S + SE + E Asia, Papuasia
- Bridelia grandis – W + C Africa
- Bridelia harmandii – Indochina
- Bridelia insulana – SE Asia, Papuasia, Queensland, Micronesia
- Bridelia leichhardtii – Queensland
- Bridelia macrocarpa – Maluku, New Guinea
- Bridelia micrantha – tropical – S Africa, Réunion
- Bridelia microphylla – Somalia
- Bridelia mollis – southern Africa
- Bridelia montana – India
- Bridelia moonii – Sri Lanka
- Bridelia ndellensis – C Africa
- Bridelia nicobarica – Nicobar Islands
- Bridelia oligantha – Papua New Guinea
- Bridelia ovata Decne. – Indo-China to W. Malesia
- Bridelia parvifolia – Hainan, Vietnam
- Bridelia pervilleana – Madagascar
- Bridelia pustulata – Malaysia, Sumatra, Borneo, Philippines
- Bridelia retusa – S China, S + SE Asia
- Bridelia rhomboidalis – Madagascar
- Bridelia ripicola – C Africa
- Bridelia scleroneura – Yemen, tropical Africa
- Bridelia sikkimensis – Himalayas
- Bridelia somalensis – Somalia
- Bridelia speciosa – W Africa
- Bridelia stipularis – S + E + SE Asia
- Bridelia taitensis – Kenya
- Bridelia tenuifolia – Angola, Namibia
- Bridelia tomentosa – S + E + SE Asia, New Guinea, Australia
- Bridelia triplocarya – Papua New Guinea
- Bridelia tulasneana – Madagascar
- Bridelia verrucosa – NE India, Himalayas
- Bridelia whitmorei – Pahang
- Bridelia wilksii – Gabon

=== Formerly included ===
Moved to other genera (Aporosa, Cleistanthus, Damnacanthus, Phyllanthus, Scleropyrum).

1. B. acuminata - Phyllanthus triandrus
2. B. attenuata - Cleistanthus oblongifolius
3. B. buxifolia - Cleistanthus stipitatus
4. B. chartacea - Cleistanthus oblongifolius
5. B. collina - Cleistanthus collinus
6. B. diversifolia - Cleistanthus diversifolius
7. B. heterantha - Phyllanthus glomerulatus
8. B. horrida - Scleropyrum pentandrum
9. B. laurina - Cleistanthus stipitatus
10. B. loureiroi - Cleistanthus monoicus
11. B. monoica - Cleistanthus monoicus
12. B. oblongifolius - Cleistanthus oblongifolius
13. B. patula - Cleistanthus patulus
14. B. polystachya - Cleistanthus polystachyus
15. B. rufa - Cleistanthus rufus
16. B. rugosa - Aporosa lunata
17. B. sinica - Phyllanthus hohenackeri
18. B. spinosa DC. 1833 not (Roxb.) Willd. 1806 - Damnacanthus indicus
19. B. stipitata - Cleistanthus stipitatus
20. B. stipularis Hook. & Arn. 1837 not (L.) Blume 1826 - Cleistanthus stipularis

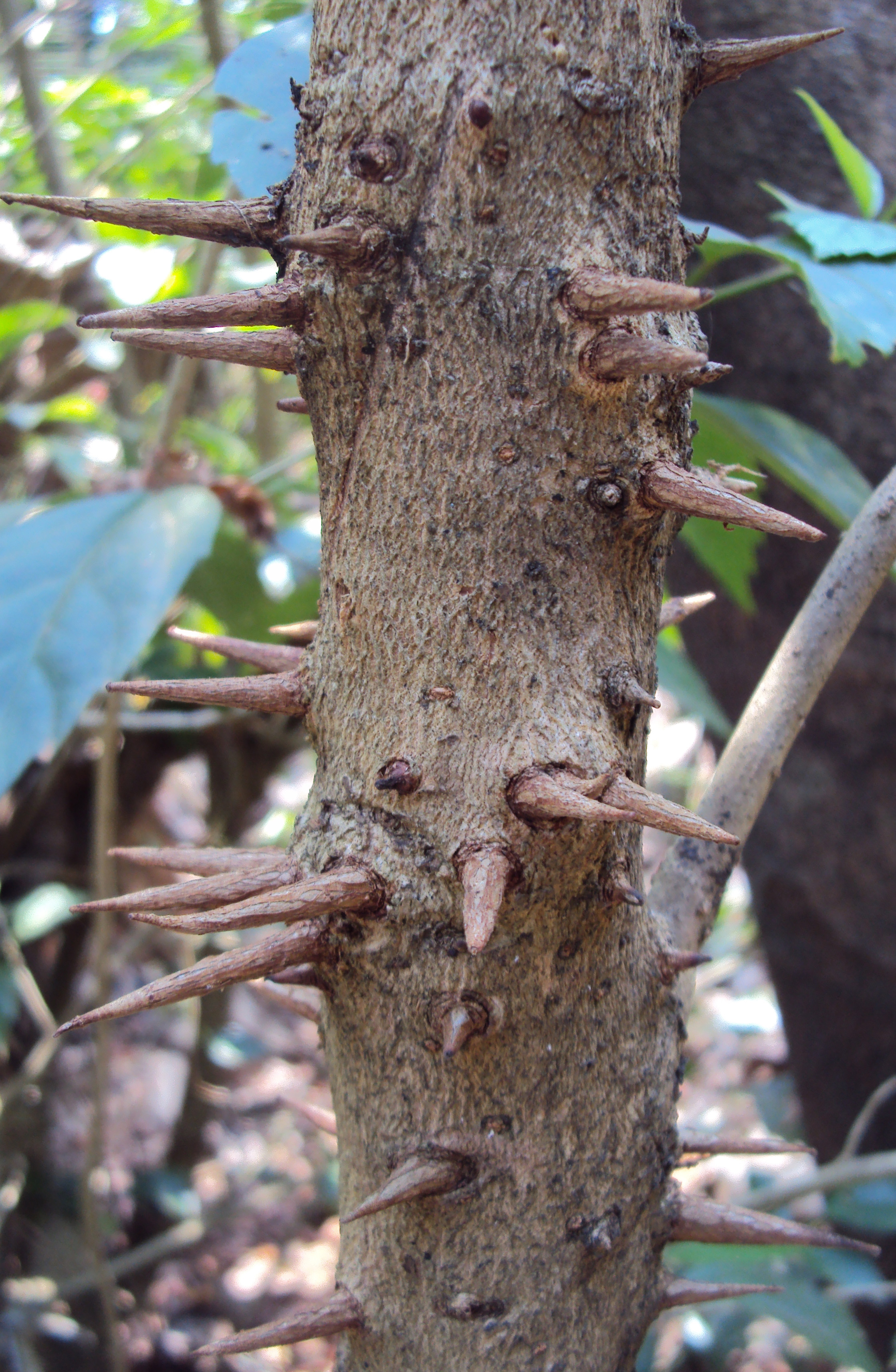
Bridelia retusa bark

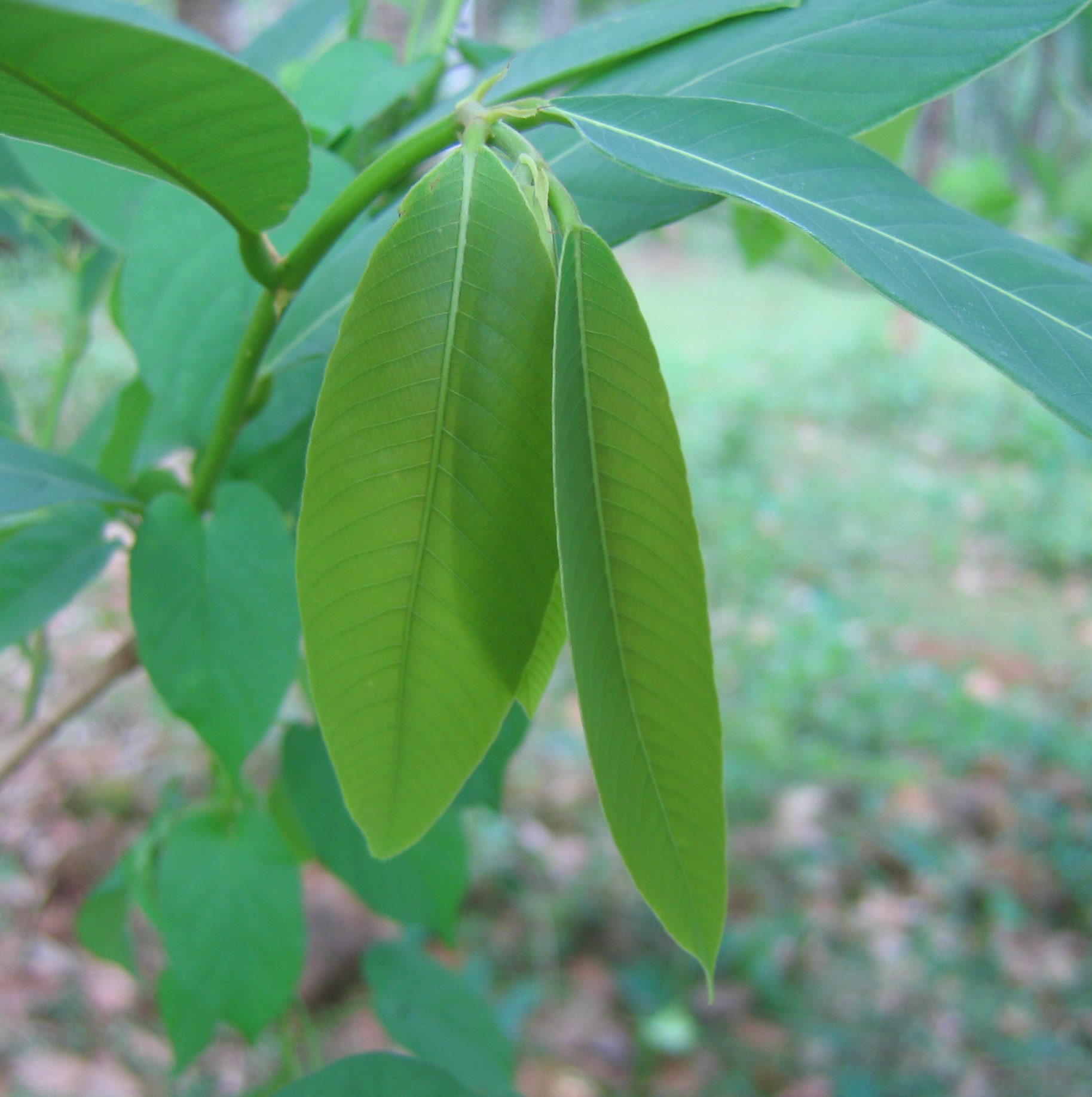
Bridelia retusa leaves
