= Micrandropsis =

Scientific classification
- Kingdom: Plantae
- Clade: Tracheophytes
- Clade: Angiosperms
- Clade: Eudicots
- Clade: Rosids
- Order: Malpighiales
- Family: Euphorbiaceae
- Subfamily: Crotonoideae
- Tribe: Micrandreae
- Subtribe: Micrandrinae
- Genus: Micrandropsis; W.A.Rodrigues
- Species: M. scleroxylon

Binomial name
- Micrandropsis scleroxylon (W.A.Rodrigues) W.A.Rodrigues

Synonyms
- Micrandra scleroxylon W.A.Rodrigues

Genus of plants

Micrandropsis is a plant genus of the family Euphorbiaceae first described as a genus in 1973. It contains only one known species, Micrandropsis scleroxylon, endemic to the State of Amazonas in northwestern Brazil.
