= Pogonophora =

There are two taxa with the name Pogonophora:

- Pogonophora, an obsolete animal phylum, now treated as part of the family Siboglinidae
- Pogonophora (plant), a genus in the Euphorbiaceae
