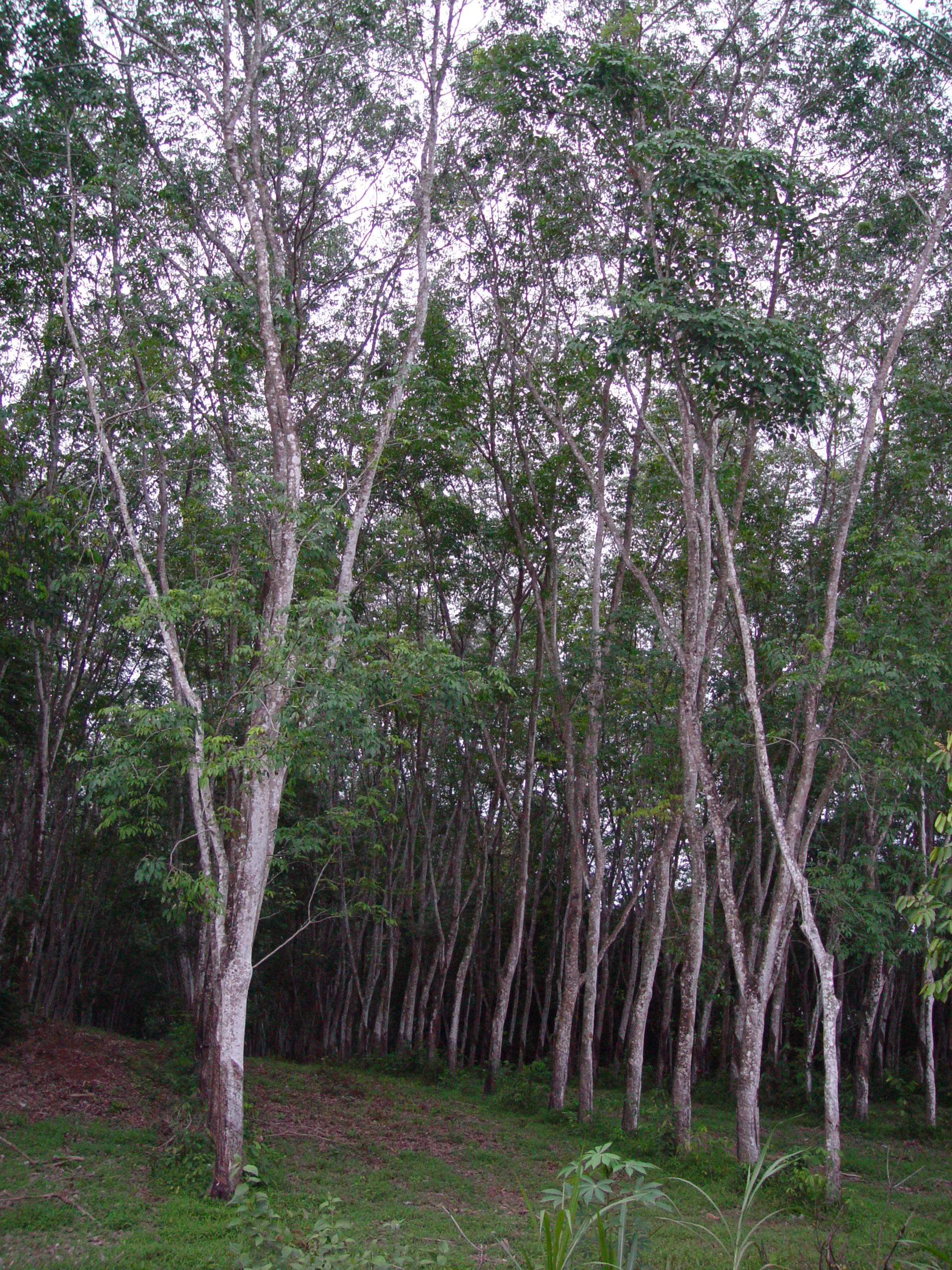
- Hevea brasiliensis in cultivation

Scientific classification
- Kingdom: Plantae
- Clade: Tracheophytes
- Clade: Angiosperms
- Clade: Eudicots
- Clade: Rosids
- Order: Malpighiales
- Family: Euphorbiaceae
- Subfamily: Crotonoideae
- Tribe: Micrandreae

Subtribes
- Heveinae; Micrandrinae

= Micrandreae =

Tribe of flowering plants

Micrandreae is a tribe of the subfamily Crotonoideae, under the family Euphorbiaceae. It comprises 2 subtribes and 4 genera.

== Genera ==
Subtribe Heveinae

- Hevea Aubl.

Subtribe Micrandrinae

- Cunuria Baill.
- Micrandra Benth.
- Micrandropsis W.A.Rodrigues

== See also ==
- Taxonomy of the Euphorbiaceae
