= Dichomeris microsphena =

Scientific classification
- Kingdom: Animalia
- Phylum: Arthropoda
- Clade: Pancrustacea
- Class: Insecta
- Order: Lepidoptera
- Family: Gelechiidae
- Genus: Dichomeris
- Species: D. microsphena

Binomial name
- Dichomeris microsphena Meyrick, 1921

Species of moth

Dichomeris microsphena is a moth in the family Gelechiidae. It was described by Edward Meyrick in 1921. It is found in China (Hong Kong), Taiwan, north-eastern India and Java, Indonesia.

The wingspan is 12.5–14 mm.

The larvae feed on Bridelia ovata.
