= Chaetocarpus ferrugineus =

Scientific classification
- Kingdom: Plantae
- Clade: Tracheophytes
- Clade: Angiosperms
- Clade: Eudicots
- Clade: Rosids
- Order: Malpighiales
- Family: Peraceae
- Genus: Chaetocarpus
- Species: C. ferrugineus

Binomial name
- Chaetocarpus ferrugineus Philcox.

Species of flowering plant

Chaetocarpus ferrugineus is a plant of the family Peraceae which is endemic to Sri Lanka.

== Ecology ==
Rainforest understory wet zone.

== Uses ==
Wood – fuelwood.

== Culture ==
Known as ලමිරිය (lamiriya) in Sinhala.
