= Pera aperta =

Conservation status
- Data Deficient (IUCN 3.1)

Scientific classification
- Kingdom: Plantae
- Clade: Tracheophytes
- Clade: Angiosperms
- Clade: Eudicots
- Clade: Rosids
- Order: Malpighiales
- Family: Peraceae
- Genus: Pera
- Species: P. aperta

Binomial name
- Pera aperta Croizat

Species of flowering plant

Pera aperta is a species of plant in the family Peraceae. It is endemic to Panama.
