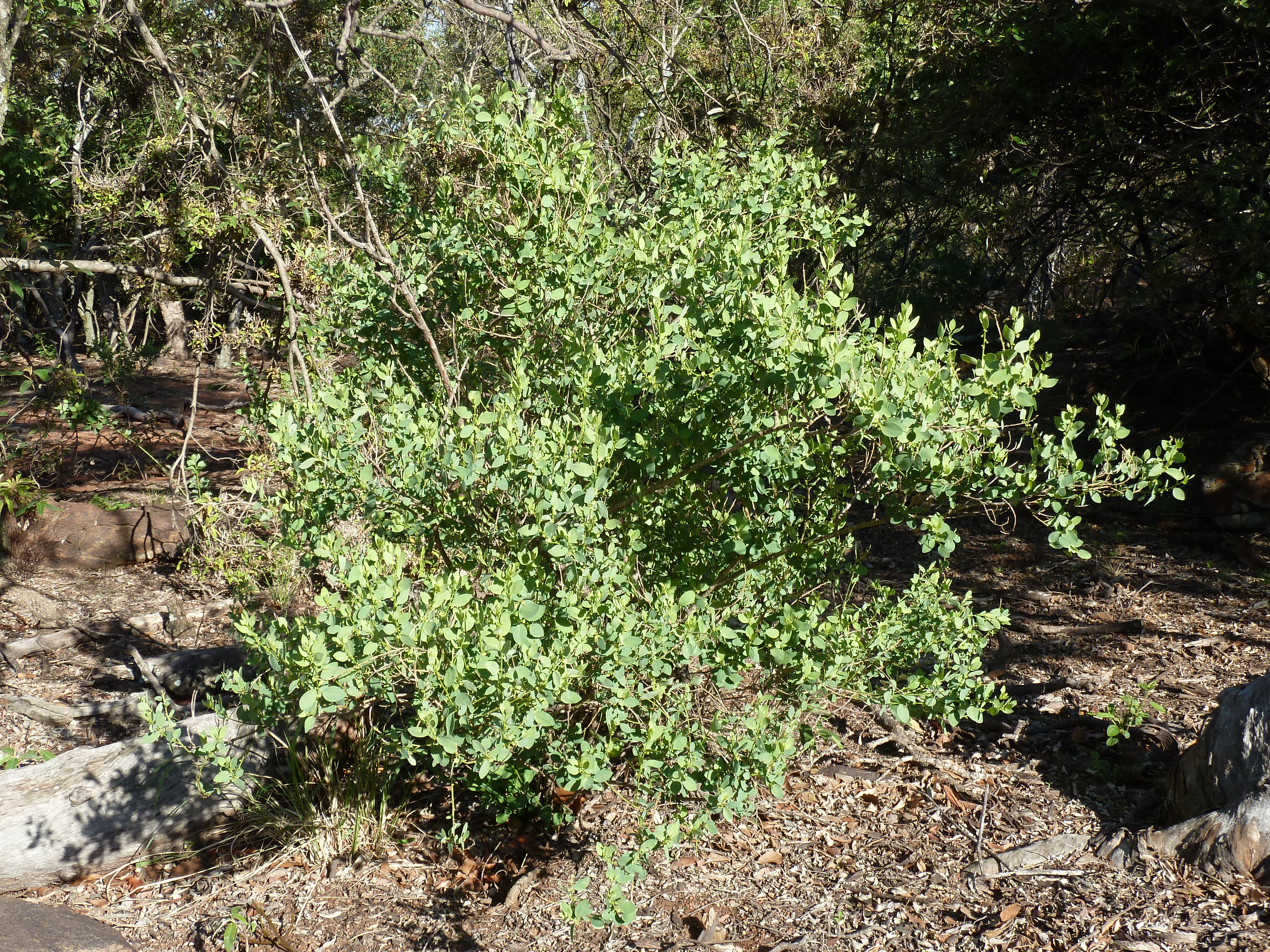
- C. pulchella var. pulchella

Scientific classification
- Kingdom: Plantae
- Clade: Tracheophytes
- Clade: Angiosperms
- Clade: Eudicots
- Clade: Rosids
- Order: Malpighiales
- Family: Peraceae
- Genus: Clutia
- Species: C. pulchella

Binomial name
- Clutia pulchella L.

= Clutia pulchella =

Species of flowering plant

Clutia pulchella, the lightning bush, is a southern African dioecious shrub of the family Peraceae. It occurs at middle altitudes in Namibia, Mozambique, Zimbabwe, Eswatini, Botswana, Lesotho and South Africa.

== Description ==
They may grow 2–3 metres (6.6–9.8 ft) high, and occur on a variety of broken terrain types.

The twigs are green with some wart-like growths. Leaf shape is somewhat variable, either blunt-tipped ovate or broadly lanceolate. The foliage is bluish-green but sometimes interspersed with some bright orange leaves. They are soft with venation that is transparent against light, besides the numerous glands that dot each leaf. (Note: i.e. punctate with pellucid glands, or pellucid-punctate.)

The axillary flowers develop into spherical, clearly three-chambered capsules. The capsules are about 3 millimetres (0.12 in) in diameter, and may bear warts. Seeds are released when the dry capsules burst open.

It is a food plant for the Heidelberg copper butterfly. It is similar to the related monoecious species C. abyssinica, which has the leaves more elongated.

Close-ups

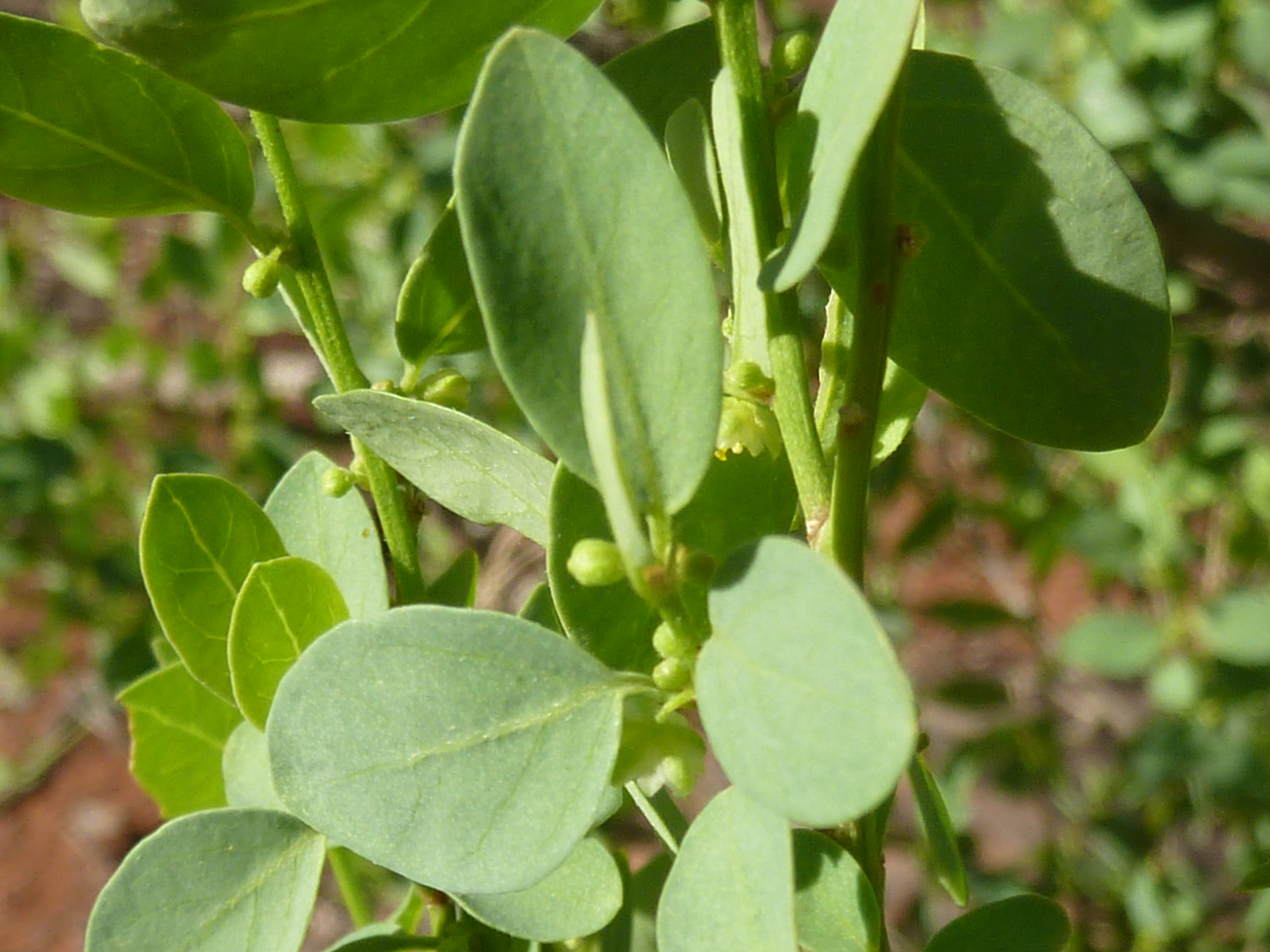
Foliage

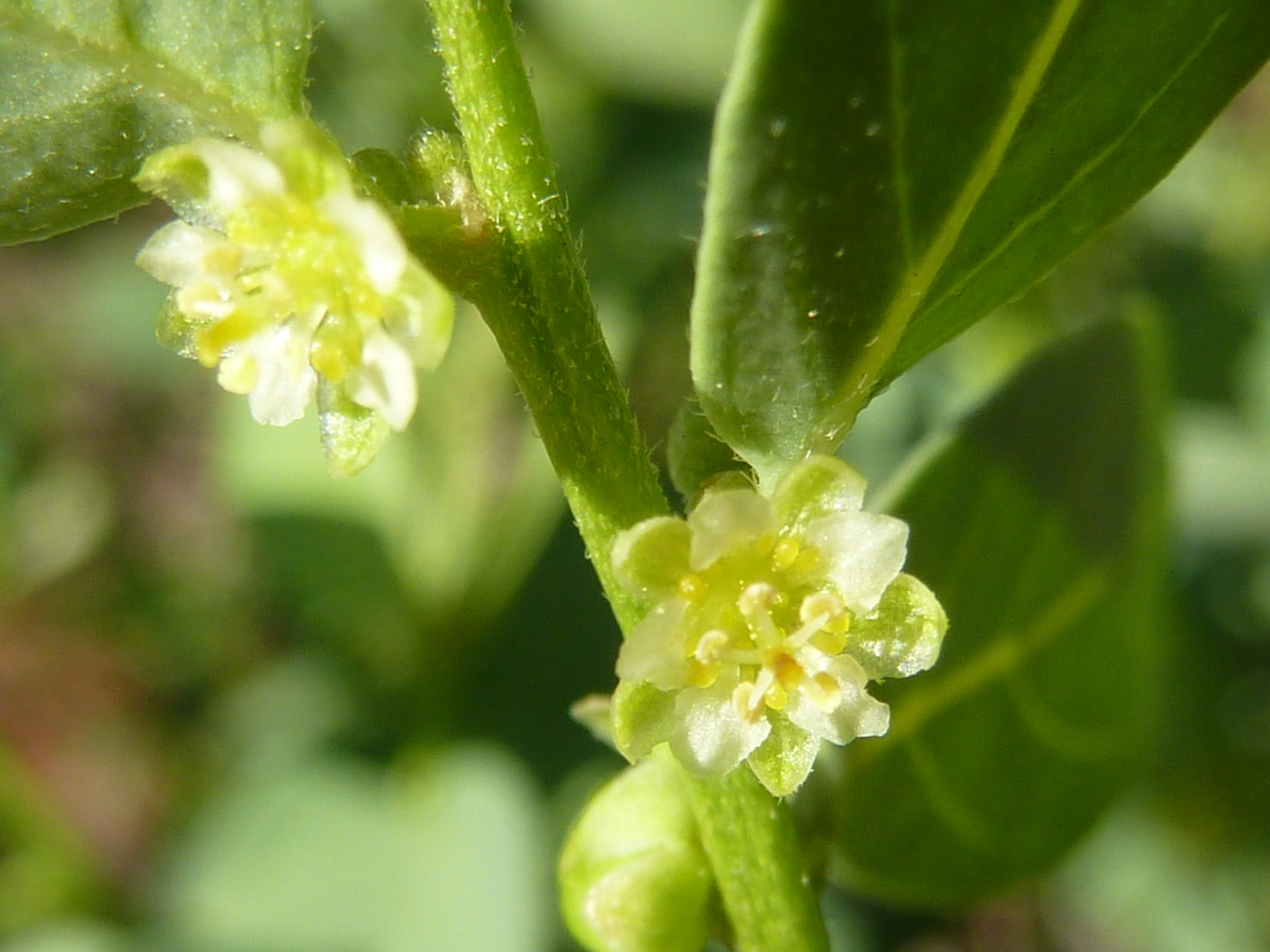
Flowers

== Infra-specific taxa ==
- Clutia pulchella var. pulchella – widespread
- Clutia pulchella var. franksiae Prain – localized in South Africa
- Clutia pulchella var. obtusata Sond. – localized in South Africa and Zimbabwe
