= Chaetocarpus castanocarpus =

Scientific classification
- Kingdom: Plantae
- Clade: Tracheophytes
- Clade: Angiosperms
- Clade: Eudicots
- Clade: Rosids
- Order: Malpighiales
- Family: Peraceae
- Genus: Chaetocarpus
- Species: C. castanocarpus

Binomial name
- Chaetocarpus castanocarpus (Roxb.) Thw.

Synonyms
- Adelia castanocarpa Roxb.; Chaetocarpus pungens Thwaites; Regnaldia clutioides Baill.; Regnaldia myrtioides Baill.

Species of flowering plant

Chaetocarpus castanocarpus is a plant of the family Peraceae. The tree is evergreen and about 45 metres (148 ft) high. Leaves are simple and alternate. Flower color may vary from greenish yellow to yellow. It is distributed in Myanmar, Cambodia, Indonesia, India, Sri Lanka, Thailand, Andaman Islands, Bangladesh, Vietnam and Laos. Tree trunk is used for construction purposes. Leaves are used as a leafy vegetable.

== Culture ==
Known as හැඩවක (Hedawaka / Hedoke) in Sinhala by Sinhalese people in Sri Lanka. Leaves and roots are widely used as an Ayurvedic purposes which used for the treatments muscular pains and tendons pains.
