= Chaetocarpus coriaceus =

Conservation status
- Vulnerable (IUCN 2.3)

Scientific classification
- Kingdom: Plantae
- Clade: Tracheophytes
- Clade: Angiosperms
- Clade: Eudicots
- Clade: Rosids
- Order: Malpighiales
- Family: Peraceae
- Genus: Chaetocarpus
- Species: C. coriaceus

Binomial name
- Chaetocarpus coriaceus Thw.

Species of flowering plant

Chaetocarpus coriaceus is a plant of the family Peraceae which is endemic to Sri Lanka.

== Uses ==
Wood – fuelwood.

== Culture ==
Known as පොල් හැඩවක (pol hedawaka) in Sinhala.
