= Perula =

Perula or perule can refer to:

- One of the scales of a leaf bud (also called a perular scale)
- A plant genus in the family Euphorbiaceae, now considered a synonym of Pera
- A plant genus in the family Moraceae, considered a probable synonym of Ficus
- Perula (moth), a genus of moths in the family Pyralinae
