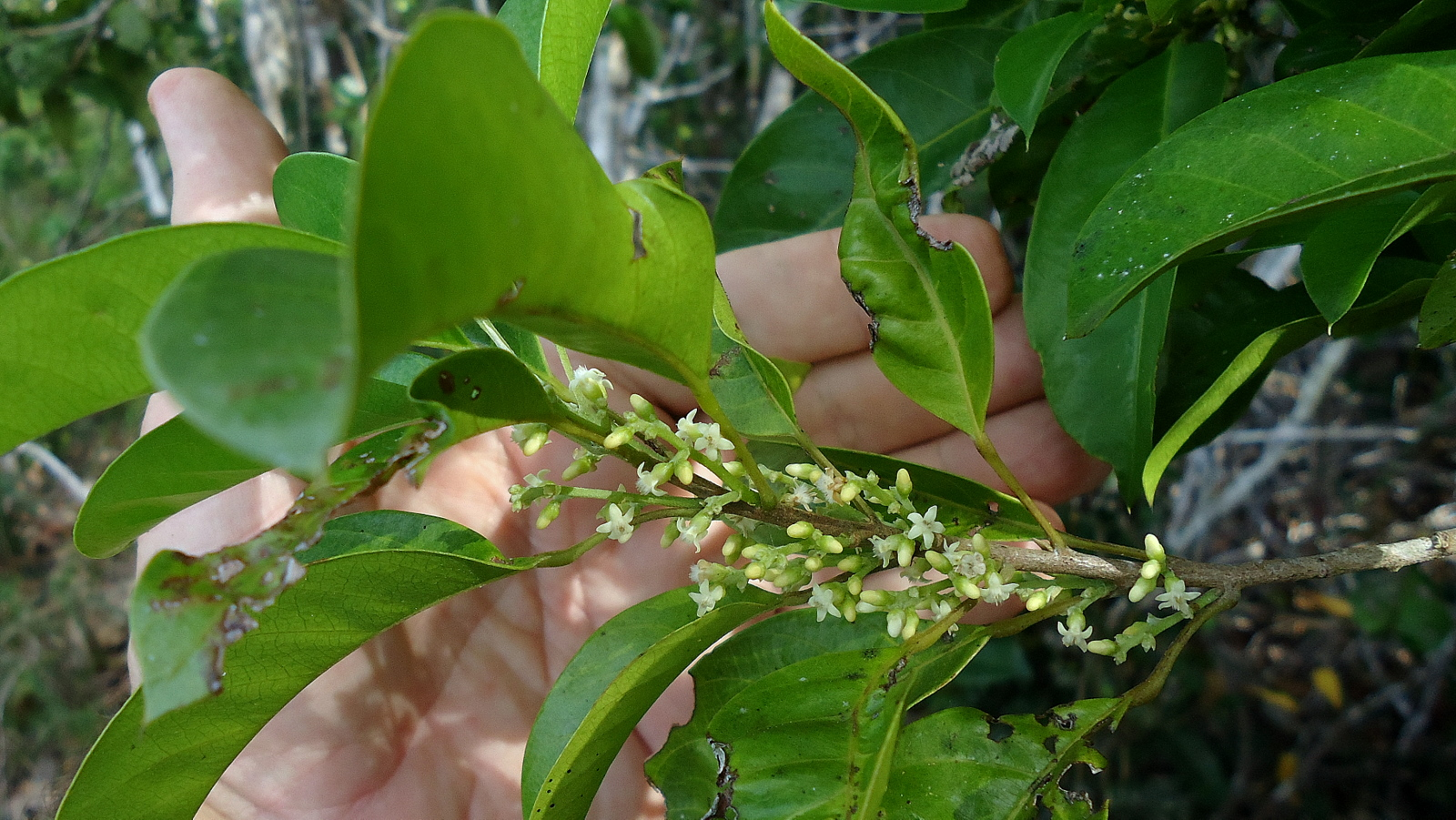
- Pogonophora schomburgkiana

Scientific classification
- Kingdom: Plantae
- Clade: Embryophytes
- Clade: Tracheophytes
- Clade: Angiosperms
- Clade: Eudicots
- Clade: Rosids
- Order: Malpighiales
- Family: Peraceae
- Genus: Pogonophora; Miers ex Benth., 1854

Synonyms
- Poraresia Gleason

= Pogonophora (plant) =

Genus of flowering plants

Pogonophora is a plant genus of the family Peraceae first described as a genus in 1854. It is native to central Africa and northern South America.

Species

1. Pogonophora letouzeyi Feuillet, 1993 - Gabon, Congo
2. Pogonophora schomburgkiana Miers ex Benth., 1854 - Colombia, Venezuela, Guyana, Suriname, Fr Guinea, N + E Brazil

formerly included

moved to other genera (Micrandra, Pausandra)

- P. cunuri - Micrandra spruceana
- P. trianae - Pausandra trianae
