= Trigonopleura =

Scientific classification
- Kingdom: Plantae
- Clade: Tracheophytes
- Clade: Angiosperms
- Clade: Eudicots
- Clade: Rosids
- Order: Malpighiales
- Family: Peraceae
- Genus: Trigonopleura; Hook.f.

Type species
- Trigonopleura malayana Hook.f.

Synonyms
- Peniculifera Ridl.

Genus of flowering plants

Trigonopleura is a plant genus of the family Peraceae, first described as a genus in 1887. It is native to Indonesia, Malaysia, and the Philippines.

Species

1. Trigonopleura dubia (Elmer) Merr. - Philippines
2. Trigonopleura macrocarpa Airy Shaw - Sarawak
3. Trigonopleura malayana Hook.f. - Peninsular Malaysia, Sumatra, Bangka, Borneo, Sulawesi
