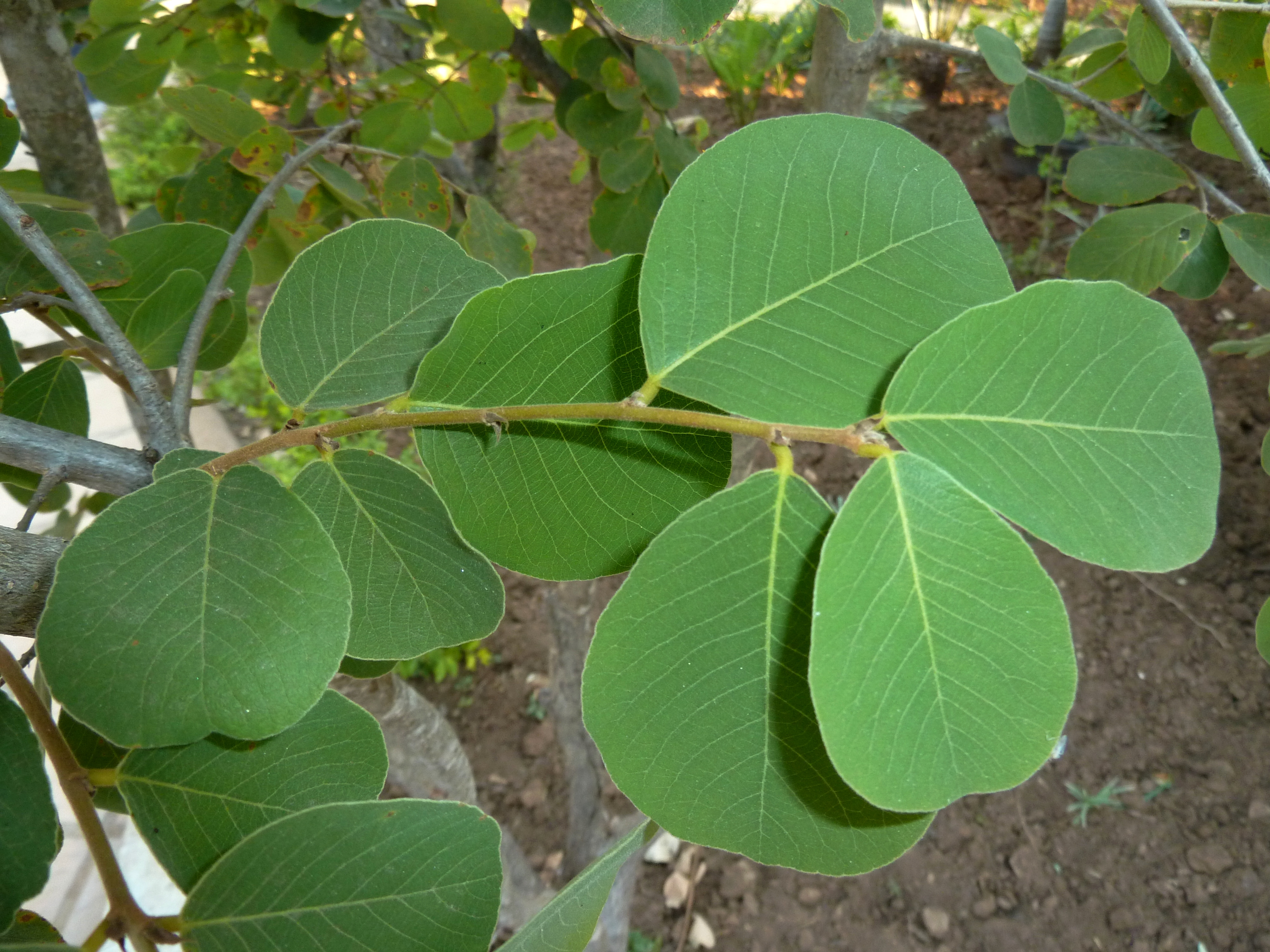
- Bridelia mollis leaves

Conservation status
- Least Concern (IUCN 3.1)

Scientific classification
- Kingdom: Plantae
- Clade: Tracheophytes
- Clade: Angiosperms
- Clade: Eudicots
- Clade: Rosids
- Order: Malpighiales
- Family: Phyllanthaceae
- Genus: Bridelia
- Species: B. mollis

Binomial name
- Bridelia mollis Hutch.

= Bridelia mollis =

Species of flowering plant

Bridelia mollis is a tree in the family Phyllanthaceae. It is native to southern Africa (Mozambique, Malawi, Zimbabwe, Zambia, Botswana, Namibia, and Limpopo).
