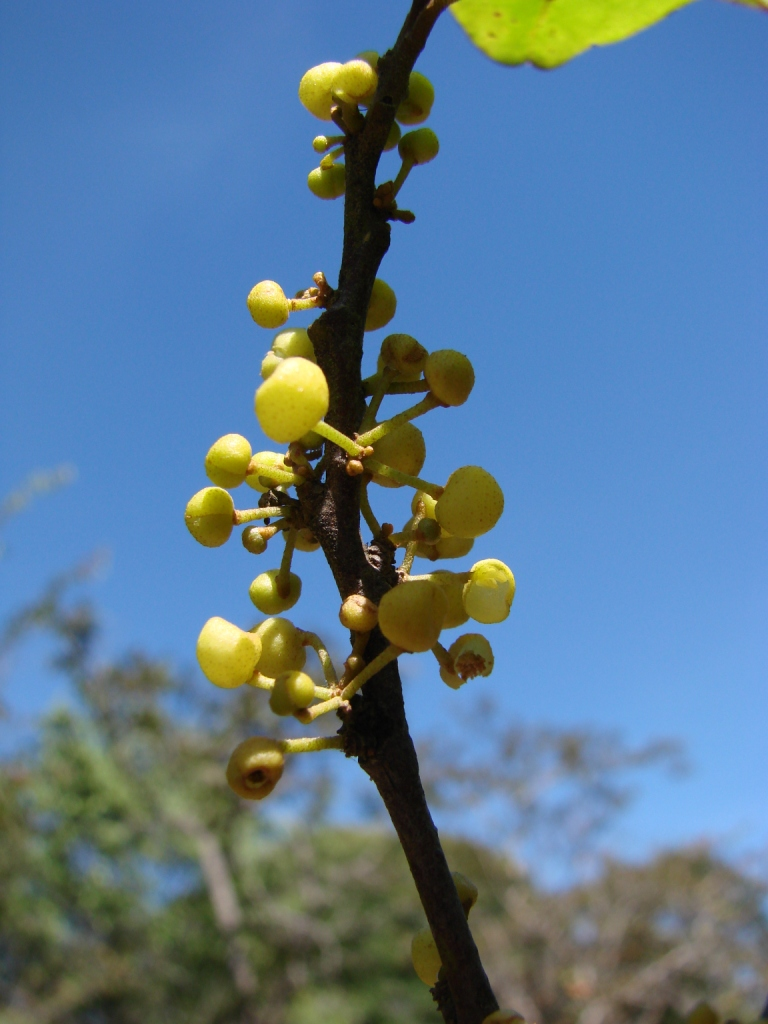
- Fruits of Pera glabrata

Scientific classification
- Kingdom: Plantae
- Clade: Tracheophytes
- Clade: Angiosperms
- Clade: Eudicots
- Clade: Rosids
- Order: Malpighiales
- Family: Peraceae
- Genus: Pera; Mutis

Synonyms
- Perula Schreb.; Spixia Leandro; Peridium Schott; Schismatopera Klotzsch; Clistranthus Poit. ex Baill.

= Pera (plant) =

Genus of flowering plants

Pera is a genus of plants in the family Peraceae native to tropical America, from southern Mexico and the West Indies south as far as Paraguay. It first described as a genus in 1784.

Species

1. Pera androgyna - Distrito Federal in Brazil
2. Pera anisotricha - Brazil
3. Pera aperta - Panama
4. Pera arborea Central America, Colombia, Venezuela
5. Pera barbellata - S Mexico, N Central America
6. Pera benensis - Colombia, Peru, Bolivia, NW Brazil
7. Pera bicolor - NW Brazil, Venezuela, 3 Guianas
8. Pera bumeliifolia - Bahamas, Cuba, Hispaniola
9. Pera citriodora - S Venezuela, N Brazil
10. Pera coccinea - Pará, Mato Grosso
11. Pera colombiana - Colombia
12. Pera decipiens - N South America
13. Pera distichophylla - N South America
14. Pera eiteniorum - Brazil
15. Pera ekmanii - Cuba
16. Pera elliptica - Bolivia
17. Pera furfuracea - Bahia
18. Pera glabrata - Trinidad, tropical S America
19. Pera glomerata - Tortuga Island in Haiti
20. Pera heteranthera - Brazil
21. Pera longipes - Cuba
22. Pera manausensis - Amazonas in Brazil
23. Pera membranacea - Pará, Maranhão
24. Pera microcarpa - Cuba
25. Pera oppositifolia - Cuba
26. Pera orientensis - Cuba
27. Pera ovalifolia - Cuba
28. Pera pallidifolia - Cuba
29. Pera polylepis - Cuba
30. Pera pulchrifolia - Amazonas in Brazil
31. Pera rubra - Rio de Janeiro
32. Pera tomentosa - S Venezuela, Brazil, Peru, Bolivia

Species

moved to Chaetocarpus

- P. echinocarpa - Chaetocarpus echinocarpus
