= Phyllanthus hohenackeri var. johnstonei =

Conservation status
- Vulnerable (IUCN 2.3)

Scientific classification
- Kingdom: Plantae
- Clade: Embryophytes
- Clade: Tracheophytes
- Clade: Angiosperms
- Clade: Eudicots
- Clade: Rosids
- Order: Malpighiales
- Family: Phyllanthaceae
- Genus: Phyllanthus
- Species: P. hohenackeri
- Variety: P. h. var. johnstonei

Trinomial name
- Phyllanthus hohenackeri var. johnstonei (Hook.f.) N.P.Balakr. & Chakr. (2009)

Synonyms
- Diasperus johnstonei (Hook.f.) Kuntze (1891); Glochidion hohenackeri var. johnstonei (Hook.f.) Chakrab. & M.Gangop. (1995); Glochidion johnstonei Hook.f. (1887)

Species of flowering plant

Phyllanthus hohenackeri var. johnstonei is a variety of flowering plant in the family Phyllanthaceae. It is a tree or shrub endemic to southwestern India.

It was first described as Glochidion johnstonei by Joseph Dalton Hooker in 1887. In 2009 it was made a variety of Phyllanthus hohenackeri.
