= Bridelia speciosa =

Scientific classification
- Kingdom: Plantae
- Clade: Tracheophytes
- Clade: Angiosperms
- Clade: Eudicots
- Clade: Rosids
- Order: Malpighiales
- Family: Phyllanthaceae
- Genus: Bridelia
- Species: B. speciosa

Binomial name
- Bridelia speciosa Müll.Arg.

Species of flowering plant

Bridelia speciosa is a tree in the family Phyllanthaceae native to tropical western Africa (Burkina Faso, Ghana, Ivory Coast, Nigeria, Cameroon).
