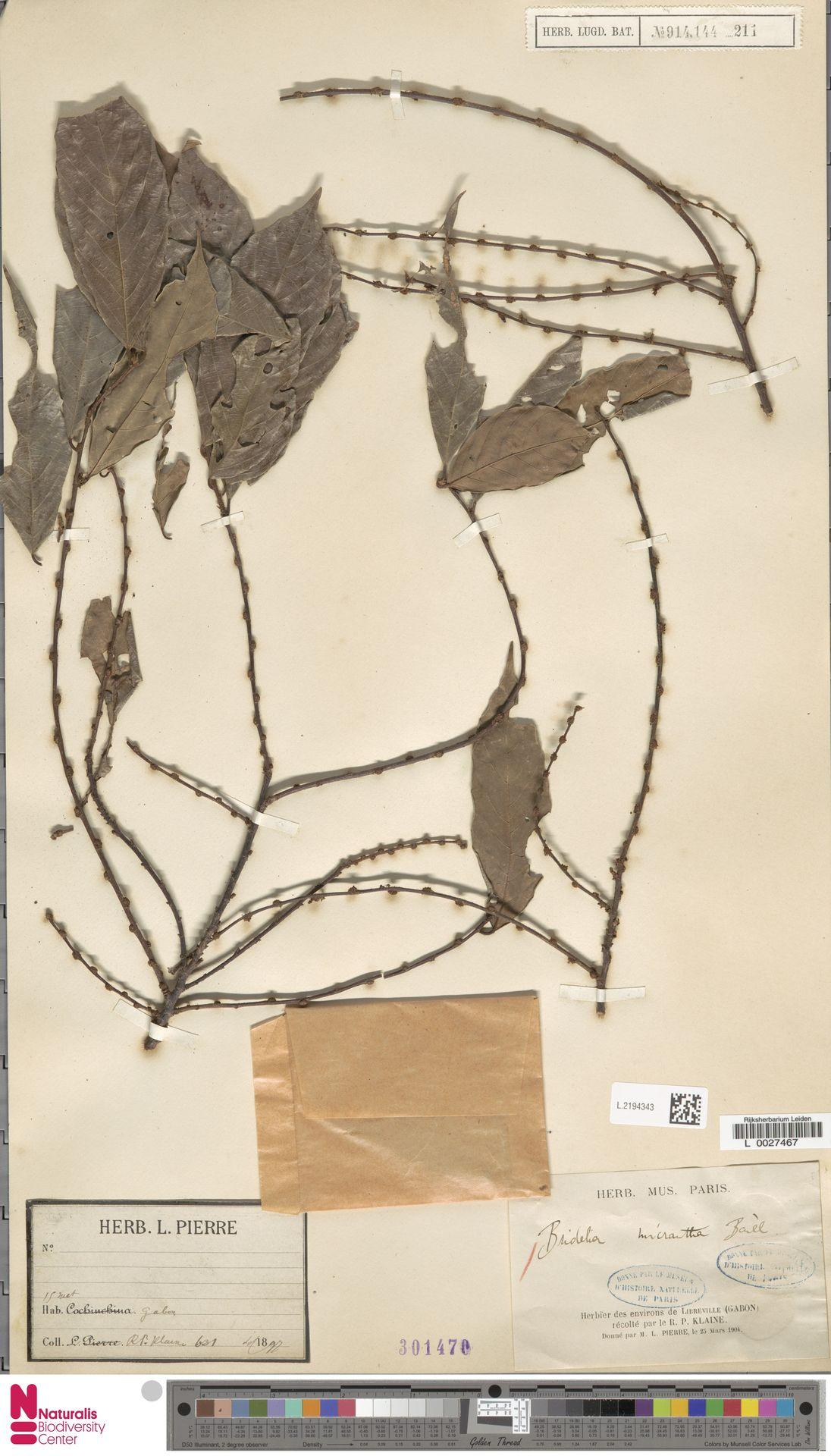
- Bridelia grandis Pierre ex Hutch. (type of) - Bridelia grandis Pierre ex Hutch. (species)

Conservation status
- Least Concern (IUCN 3.1)

Scientific classification
- Kingdom: Plantae
- Clade: Tracheophytes
- Clade: Angiosperms
- Clade: Eudicots
- Clade: Rosids
- Order: Malpighiales
- Family: Phyllanthaceae
- Genus: Bridelia
- Species: B. grandis

Binomial name
- Bridelia grandis Pierre ex Hutch.

= Bridelia grandis =

Species of plant

Bridelia grandis is a species of evergreen tree. It occurs in secondary forests of Central and West Africa. Its wood is traded under the name Assas, a name it shares with Bridelia micrantha.

== Description ==
The species is capable of reaching 30 meters in height, though usually smaller and reaching a diameter of about 80 cm. Its trunk is straight and cylindrical, the bark is rough and deeply fissured with a dark brown to black appearance. Leaves: simple, alternate distichous arrangement, leathery surface texture, they are commonly red when young before growing into a dark green color at maturity; stipules present, 6 – 10 mm, petiole, 4 – 8 mm long. Leaf blade has an elliptic to obovate outline, apex is acuminate while the base is rounded to cuneate, length within a range of 6 – 14 cm and the width is within a range of 2 – 6 cm; it has persistent soft hairs beneath. Flower, unisexual and largely monoecious. Dark purple colored fruit when ripe with a fleshy mesocarp and hard endocarp.

== Distribution ==
Occurs in West and Central Africa.

== Chemistry ==
Polyphenols and condensed tannins can be extracted from the stem bark, extracts showed some effectiveness against oral streptococci.

== Uses ==
Bark extracts used as ingredient in decoction to treat dysentery and improve lactation. In Cameroon, the Baka people use stem bark extracts to treat for oral cavity issues. Wood is used in furniture and canoe making.
