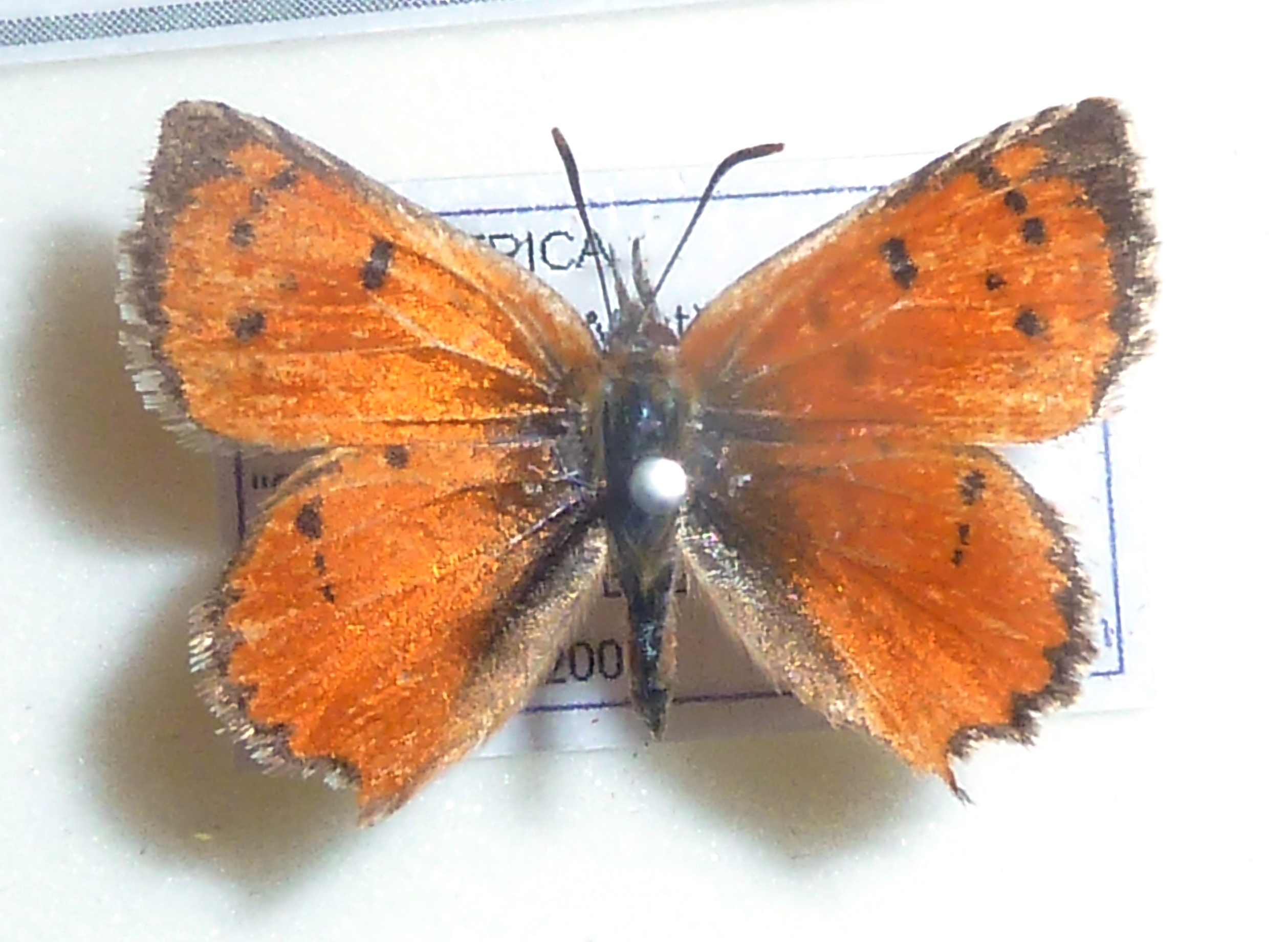

Conservation status
- Endangered (IUCN 3.1)

Scientific classification
- Kingdom: Animalia
- Phylum: Arthropoda
- Clade: Pancrustacea
- Class: Insecta
- Order: Lepidoptera
- Family: Lycaenidae
- Genus: Chrysoritis
- Species: C. aureus

Binomial name
- Chrysoritis aureus van Son, 1966

Synonyms
- Poecilmitis aureus (van Son, 1966); Chrysoritis aureus

= Chrysoritis aureus =

Heidelberg copper

Species of butterfly

Chrysoritis aureus, the Heidelberg copper or golden opal, is a species of butterfly in the family Lycaenidae. It is endemic to South Africa, where it is found in montane grassland in Gauteng and Mpumalanga provinces.

The wingspan is 24–28 mm for males and 28–32 mm for females. Adults are on wing year-round with peaks in December and March.

The larvae feed on Clutia pulchella varieties. They are attended to by Crematogaster liengmei ants.
