= Bridelia whitmorei =

Conservation status
- Vulnerable (IUCN 2.3)

Scientific classification
- Kingdom: Plantae
- Clade: Tracheophytes
- Clade: Angiosperms
- Clade: Eudicots
- Clade: Rosids
- Order: Malpighiales
- Family: Phyllanthaceae
- Genus: Bridelia
- Species: B. whitmorei

Binomial name
- Bridelia whitmorei Airy Shaw

Species of tree

Bridelia whitmorei is a species of plant in the family Phyllanthaceae. It is a tree endemic to Peninsular Malaysia.
