= Bridelia tenuifolia =

Scientific classification
- Kingdom: Plantae
- Clade: Embryophytes
- Clade: Tracheophytes
- Clade: Spermatophytes
- Clade: Angiosperms
- Clade: Eudicots
- Clade: Rosids
- Order: Malpighiales
- Family: Phyllanthaceae
- Genus: Bridelia
- Species: B. tenuifolia

Binomial name
- Bridelia tenuifolia Müll.Arg.

Species of flowering plant

Bridelia tenuifolia is a tree in the family Phyllanthaceae. It is native to southern Africa (Angola and Namibia).
