= Micrandra minor =

Scientific classification
- Kingdom: Plantae
- Clade: Tracheophytes
- Clade: Angiosperms
- Clade: Eudicots
- Clade: Rosids
- Order: Malpighiales
- Family: Euphorbiaceae
- Genus: Micrandra
- Species: M. minor

Binomial name
- Micrandra minor Benth.

Synonyms
- Micrandra siphonioides var. minor (Benth.) Müll.Arg.

Species of plant

Micrandra minor is a species of flowering plant in the family Euphorbiaceae. It is native to and abundant in southeastern Colombia, southern Venezuela, northeastern Peru, and northern Brazil. An unbutressed, "corpulent" tree reaching 110 ft (34 m), it is typically found growing higher up on riverbanks in the rainforest. When tapped, trees produce copious amounts of a thick white latex that can be processed into the high-quality "Caurá rubber". Unfortunately the trees cannot survive repeated tapping, so they are no longer exploited.
