= Bridelia moonii =

Conservation status
- Vulnerable (IUCN 2.3)

Scientific classification
- Kingdom: Plantae
- Clade: Tracheophytes
- Clade: Angiosperms
- Clade: Eudicots
- Clade: Rosids
- Order: Malpighiales
- Family: Phyllanthaceae
- Genus: Bridelia
- Species: B. moonii

Binomial name
- Bridelia moonii Thw.

Species of flowering plant

Bridelia moonii is a species of plant in the family Phyllanthaceae. It is found in wet lowland forests and is endemic to Sri Lanka. It grows to maximum height of 15 meters.

It is listed as vulnerable according to the latest IUCN Red List report from 1998.

== Characteristics ==
The plant has a yellowish-grey trunk, with the bark of mature trees being cracked into multiple pieces. The tree has bright green oblong leaves, and round, globose fruits. The fruits are about 1 cm in diameter and turn reddish-purple when ripe.

== Culture ==
Known as පත් කෑල (path kela) in Sinhala.
