= Amanoa caribaea =

Scientific classification
- Kingdom: Plantae
- Clade: Tracheophytes
- Clade: Angiosperms
- Clade: Eudicots
- Clade: Rosids
- Order: Malpighiales
- Family: Phyllanthaceae
- Genus: Amanoa
- Species: A. caribaea

Binomial name
- Amanoa caribaea Krug & Urb.

Species of plant

Amanoa caribaea is a species of flowering plant native to Dominica and Guadeloupe, known locally as the karapit, or carapite. It was described by Karl Wilhelm Leopold Krug and Ignatz Urban in 1897. It is in the genus Amanoa and the family Phyllanthaceae.

== Description ==
Amanoa caribaea can grow 30 m (98 ft) tall, and 0.9–1.2 m (3–4 ft) in diameter. It produces buttress roots and prop roots. Its leaves are 5–10 cm long. It flowers in January, and fruits between March and May.
