= Amanoa anomala =

Conservation status
- Critically Endangered (IUCN 3.1)

Scientific classification
- Kingdom: Plantae
- Clade: Tracheophytes
- Clade: Angiosperms
- Clade: Eudicots
- Clade: Rosids
- Order: Malpighiales
- Family: Phyllanthaceae
- Genus: Amanoa
- Species: A. anomala

Binomial name
- Amanoa anomala Little

Species of flowering plant

Amanoa anomala is a species of plant in the family Phyllanthaceae. It is endemic to Ecuador. Its natural habitat is subtropical or tropical moist lowland forests.
