= Amanoa bracteosa =

Conservation status
- Vulnerable (IUCN 2.3)

Scientific classification
- Kingdom: Plantae
- Clade: Tracheophytes
- Clade: Angiosperms
- Clade: Eudicots
- Clade: Rosids
- Order: Malpighiales
- Family: Phyllanthaceae
- Genus: Amanoa
- Species: A. bracteosa

Binomial name
- Amanoa bracteosa Planch.

Species of flowering plant

Amanoa bracteosa is a species of plant in the family Phyllanthaceae. It is found in Ivory Coast, Ghana, Liberia, and Sierra Leone. It is threatened by habitat loss.
