= Amanoa strobilacea =

Conservation status
- Vulnerable (IUCN 2.3)

Scientific classification
- Kingdom: Plantae
- Clade: Tracheophytes
- Clade: Angiosperms
- Clade: Eudicots
- Clade: Rosids
- Order: Malpighiales
- Family: Phyllanthaceae
- Genus: Amanoa
- Species: A. strobilacea

Binomial name
- Amanoa strobilacea Muell.Arg.

Species of flowering plant

Amanoa strobilacea is a species of plant in the family Phyllanthaceae. It is found in Angola, Cameroon, Ghana, and Liberia. It is threatened by habitat loss.
