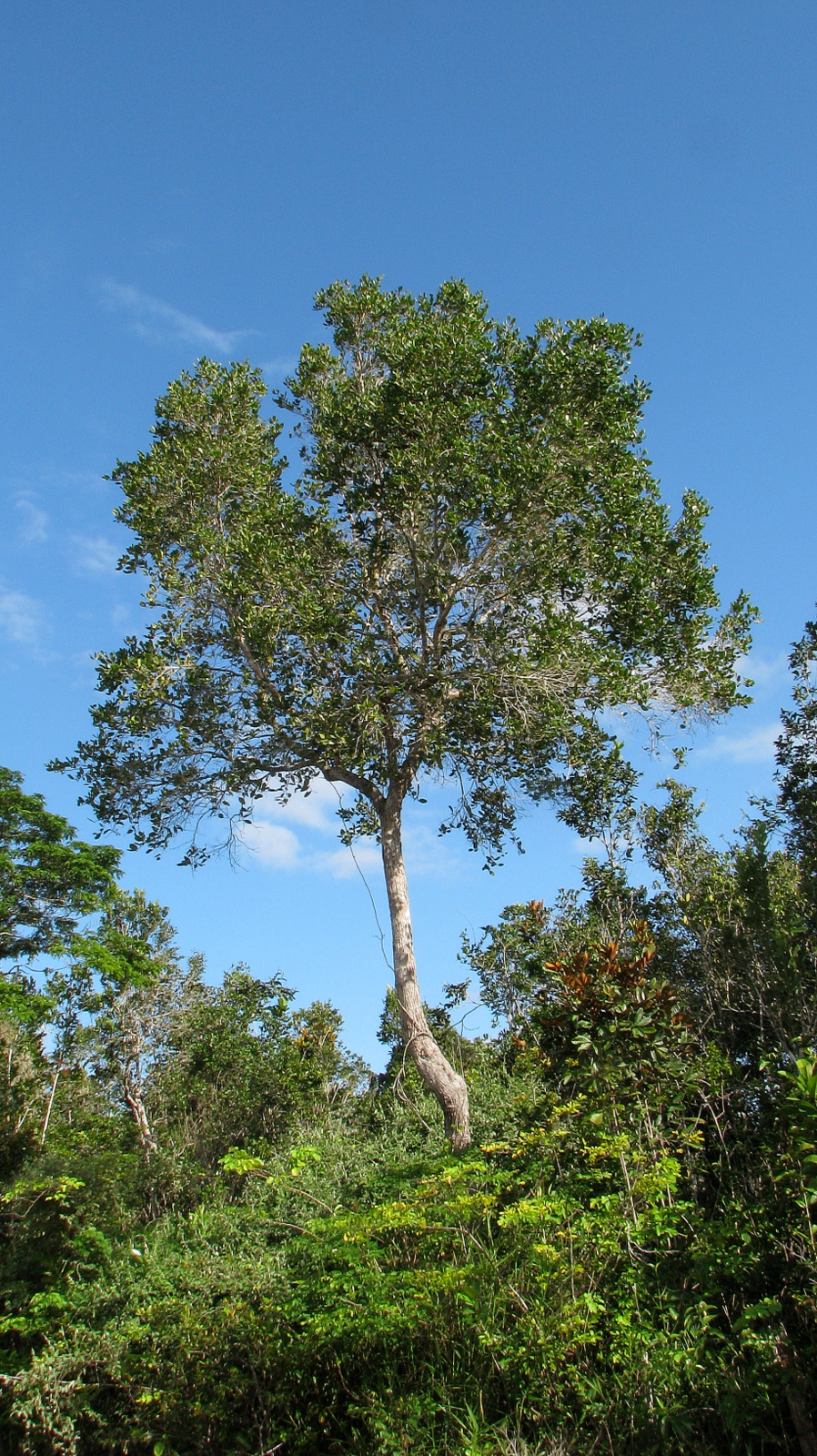
- Chaetocarpus echinocarpus

Scientific classification
- Kingdom: Plantae
- Clade: Tracheophytes
- Clade: Angiosperms
- Clade: Eudicots
- Clade: Rosids
- Order: Malpighiales
- Family: Peraceae
- Genus: Chaetocarpus; Thwaites 1854, conserved name, not Schreb. 1789 (Sapotaceae)

Type species
- Chaetocarpus pungens Thwaites

Synonyms
- Gaedawakka Kuntze; Mettenia Griseb.; Neochevaliera A.Chev. & Beille; Regnaldia Baill.

= Chaetocarpus =

Genus of flowering plants

Chaetocarpus is a genus of plants in the family Peraceae, formerly Euphorbiaceae, erected as a genus in 1854. Species of the genus Chaetocarpus grow as trees or shrubs. They are native to the Americas, Africa, and Asia. Some species are endangered.

Species

- Chaetocarpus acutifolius (Britton & P.Wilson) Borhidi – Sierra de Moa in Cuba
- Chaetocarpus africanus Pax – C Africa
- Chaetocarpus castanocarpus (Roxb.) Thwaites – SE Asia, Yunnan, Assam, Bangladesh, Sri Lanka
- Chaetocarpus cordifolius (Urb.) Borhidi – Cuba, Hispaniola, Jamaica
- Chaetocarpus coriaceus Thwaites – Sri Lanka
- Chaetocarpus cubensis Fawc. & Rendle – Cuba
- Chaetocarpus echinocarpus (Baill.) Ducke – Bolivia, Brazil
- Chaetocarpus ferrugineus Philcox – Sri Lanka
- Chaetocarpus gabonensis Breteler – Gabon
- Chaetocarpus globosus (Sw.) Fawc. & Rendle – Jamaica, Cuba, Dominican Rep.
- Chaetocarpus myrsinites Baill. – Bolivia, Brazil
- Chaetocarpus parvifolius Borhidi – Cuba
- Chaetocarpus pearcei Rusby – Bolivia
- Chaetocarpus pubescens (Thwaites) Hook.f. – Sri Lanka
- Chaetocarpus rabaraba Capuron – Madagascar
- Chaetocarpus schomburgkianus (Kuntze) Pax & K.Hoffm. – Colombia, Venezuela, 3 Guianas, NW Brazil

member of homonymic genus, synonym of Pouteria

- Chaetocarpus pouteria J.F.Gmel, synonym of Pouteria guianensis Aubl. (Sapotaceae)
