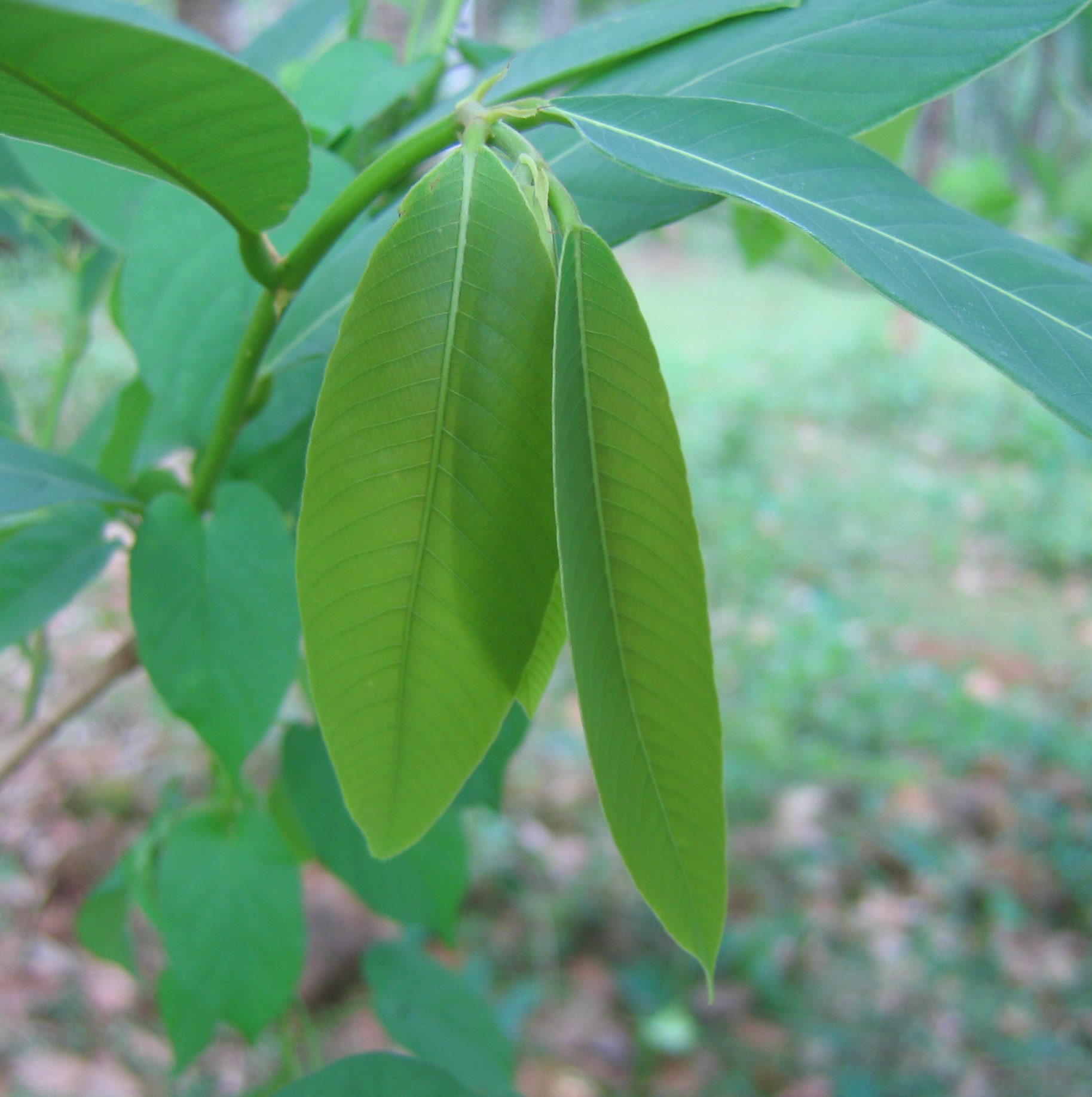

Conservation status
- Least Concern (IUCN 3.1)

Scientific classification
- Kingdom: Plantae
- Clade: Tracheophytes
- Clade: Angiosperms
- Clade: Eudicots
- Clade: Rosids
- Order: Malpighiales
- Family: Phyllanthaceae
- Genus: Bridelia
- Species: B. retusa

Binomial name
- Bridelia retusa (L.) A.Juss.

= Bridelia retusa =

Species of flowering plant

Bridelia retusa is a plant found in Bangladesh, Nepal, India, Sri Lanka, southern China, Indochina, Thailand and Sumatra.

This is the most common Indian species of Bridelia, found in dry deciduous to moist deciduous forests, mixed forest, riverbanks, rocky places, up to 2,000 m (6,560 ft) in South India, 600 m (1,970 ft) in central and Central-East India, 1,600 m (5,250 ft) on the Himalayas and 1,000 m (3,280 ft) in North-east India. It is found throughout the country excluding Andaman and Nicobar Islands. The bark of the roots is used in traditional medicine.

== Description ==
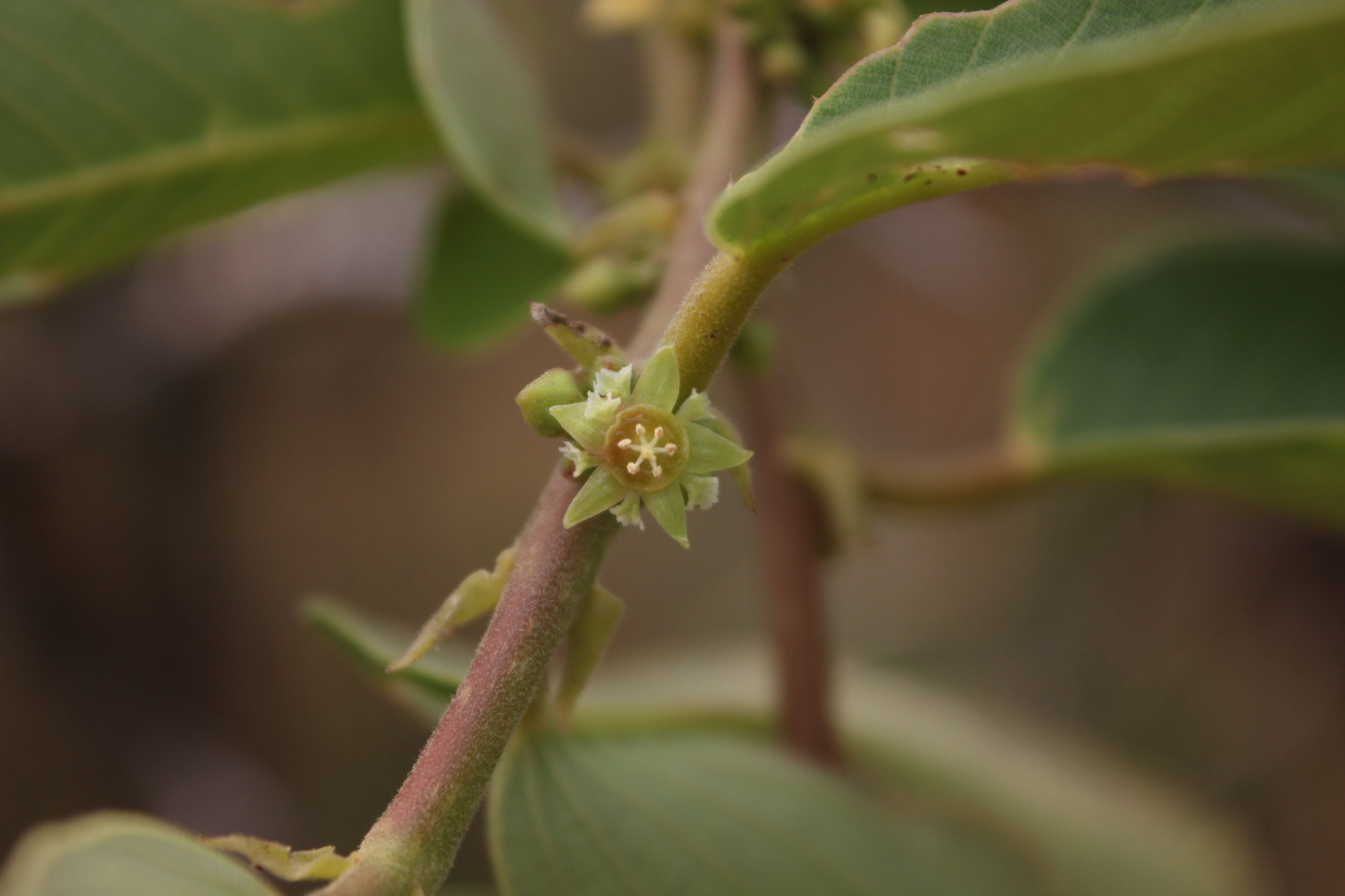
Male flower

Bridelia retusa has pale grey bark, often spiny when young to deter browsers. It becomes dark brown and fissured with the scales lifting off. The leaves are about 15 cm long and are blunt or pointy at the tip. The leaves are rounded or heart-shaped at base and are hairy and paler below.

Flowers are small and green in color and grow on leafless twigs in clusters. The petals are white and very small, while the sepals are larger. The fruit is greenish at first and ripens to a purplish-black color with two stones inside.

== Uses ==
The fruit is eaten by birds such as hornbills. The flowers are an excellent attractor of butterflies and its leaves are used as fodder.
