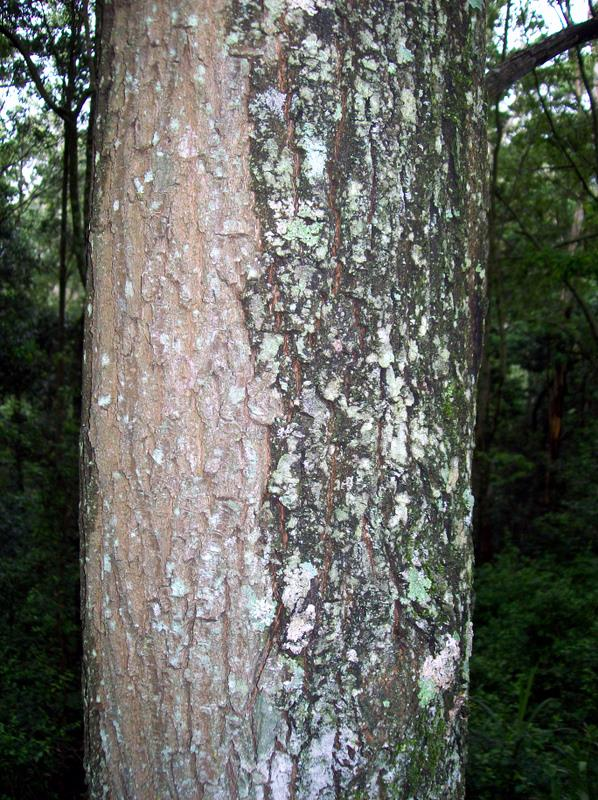
- Trunk wet after rain

Scientific classification
- Kingdom: Plantae
- Clade: Tracheophytes
- Clade: Angiosperms
- Clade: Eudicots
- Clade: Rosids
- Order: Malpighiales
- Family: Phyllanthaceae
- Genus: Bridelia
- Species: B. exaltata

Binomial name
- Bridelia exaltata F.Muell.

= Bridelia exaltata =

Species of tree

Bridelia exaltata, known as the brush ironbark or scrub ironbark, is a tree of eastern Australia. It occurs in and on the margins of the drier rainforests, and also by streams, often in association with the black bean, up to an elevation of 600 metres above sea level. It occurs from Seal Rocks, New South Wales to Maryborough, Queensland.

The generic name honours Samuel Elisée Bridel-Brideri, an expert on mosses. The specific name exaltata refers to the height of the tallest specimens.

== Description ==
A medium-sized tree, occasionally as tall as 35 metres and with a stem diameter of 90 cm. The trunk is cylindrical and not buttressed at the base.

The bark is greyish brown, rough and hard, but with some corky flakes. It can resemble the trunk of the grey persimmon. Small branches are green or brown without hairs, but with wrinkles and lenticels.

=== Leaves ===
The leaves are alternate on the stem, simple in form with smooth entire edges, elliptic or narrow elliptical in shape, 5 to 12 cm long and 2 to 5 cm wide with a blunt tip. They are round at the base, glossy green above, and a duller grey-green and hairy below. Leaf veins are seen on both surfaces, and raised underneath. There are around 15 pairs of lateral leaf veins at an angle of 60 degrees to the midrib. Leaf stalks are hairy, 3 to 5 mm long, purple or green. The leaves are thought to be poisonous to cattle.

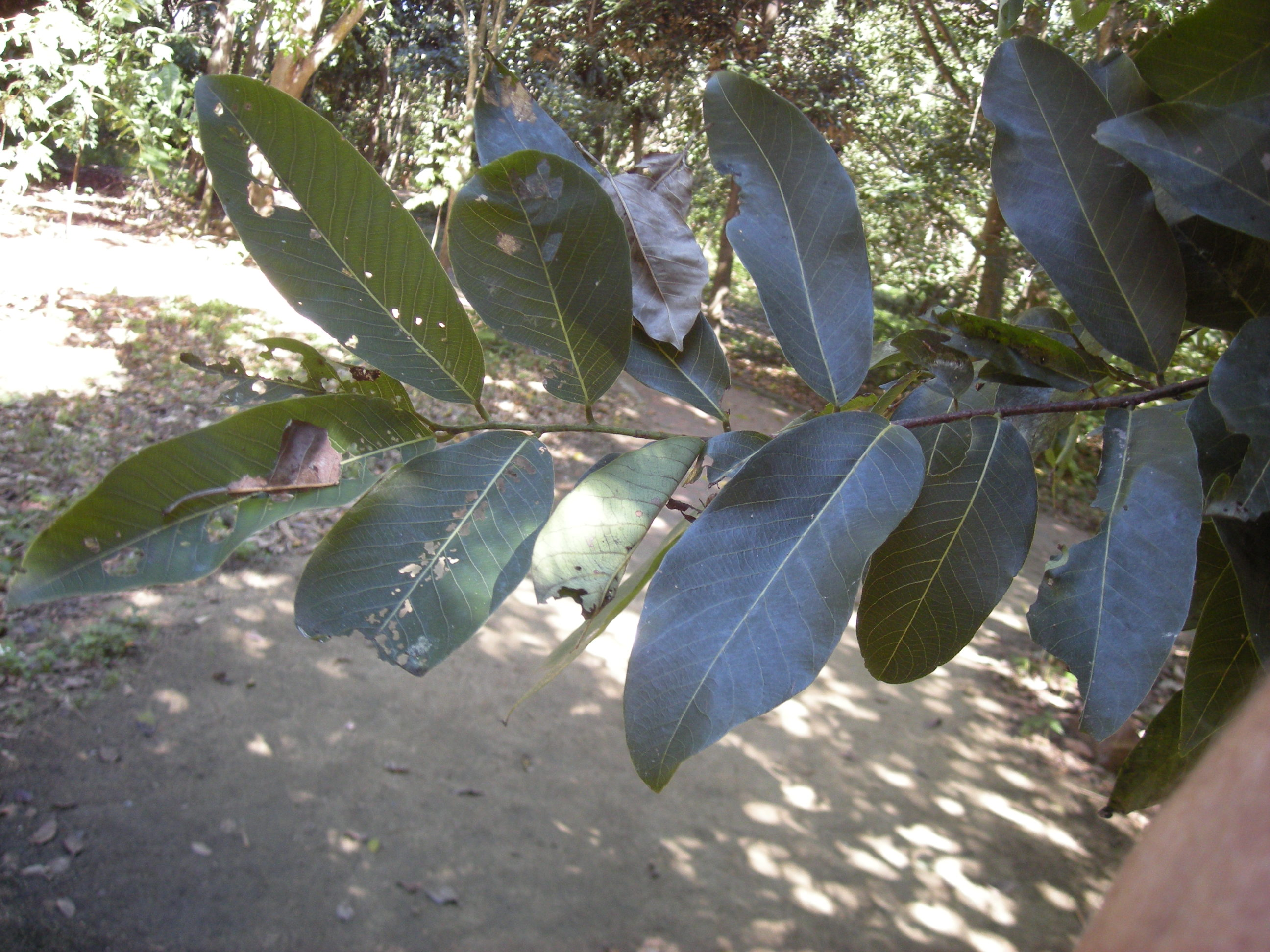
Bridelia exaltata foliage

=== Flowers and fruit ===
Yellowish green flowers form in July. The male and female flowers are separate, but often on the same tree. The fruit is a glossy drupe, 1 cm in diameter, and orange-brown in colour with small green or yellow spots. Inside is a two-celled "stone", which is 8 mm in diameter. Usually, there is one seed in each cell. The fruit is ripe from March to July, and eaten by a variety of birds.
