= Micrandra =

Scientific classification
- Kingdom: Plantae
- Clade: Embryophytes
- Clade: Tracheophytes
- Clade: Spermatophytes
- Clade: Angiosperms
- Clade: Eudicots
- Clade: Rosids
- Order: Malpighiales
- Family: Euphorbiaceae
- Subfamily: Crotonoideae
- Tribe: Micrandreae
- Subtribe: Micrandrinae
- Genus: Micrandra; Benth.

Type species
- Micrandra siphonioides Benth.

Synonyms
- Clusiophyllum Müll.Arg.; Pogonophyllum Didr.; Cunuria Baill.

Genus of flowering plants

Micrandra is a plant genus of the family Euphorbiaceae first described in 1854. It is native to South America.

== Species ==
Species currently included in Micrandra:

1. Micrandra australis (R.E.Schult.) R.E.Schult. - Amazonas in Brazil
2. Micrandra elata (Didr.) Müll.Arg. - Suriname, French Guiana, Guyana, Colombia, Peru (Pasco, Loreto), Brazil (São Paulo, Bahia, Amapá, Amazonas, etc.)
3. Micrandra glabra (R.E.Schult.) R.E.Schult. - S Venezuela (Bolívar, Amazonas), Guyana, Suriname
4. Micrandra gleasoniana (Croizat) R.E.Schult. - Guyana
5. Micrandra heterophylla Poiss. - Amazonas in Venezuela
6. Micrandra inundata P.E.Berry & Wiedenh. - Amazonas in Venezuela
7. Micrandra lopezii R.E.Schult. - Amazonas in Brazil
8. Micrandra minor Benth. - Colombia (Amazonas, Vaupes), Venezuela (Bolívar, Amazonas), Brazil (Amazonas), Peru (Pasco, Loreto)
9. Micrandra rossiana R.E.Schult. - Guyana, Venezuela (Bolívar, Amazonas, Apure, Zulia), Colombia (Vaupés), Ecuador, Brazil (Amazonas, Roraima)
10. Micrandra siphonioides Benth. - French Guiana, Venezuela (Bolívar, Amazonas, Apure), Colombia, Peru, Brazil (Amazonas, Bahia, São Paulo, Pará)
11. Micrandra spruceana (Baill.) R.E.Schult. - Suriname, Venezuela (Amazonas), Colombia (Amazonas, Vaupes), Peru (Loreto, Pasco, San Martín), Brazil (Amazonas, Roraima)
12. Micrandra sprucei (Müll.Arg.) R.E.Schult. - Guyana, Colombia (Vaupés), Venezuela (Amazonas), Brazil (Amazonas)
