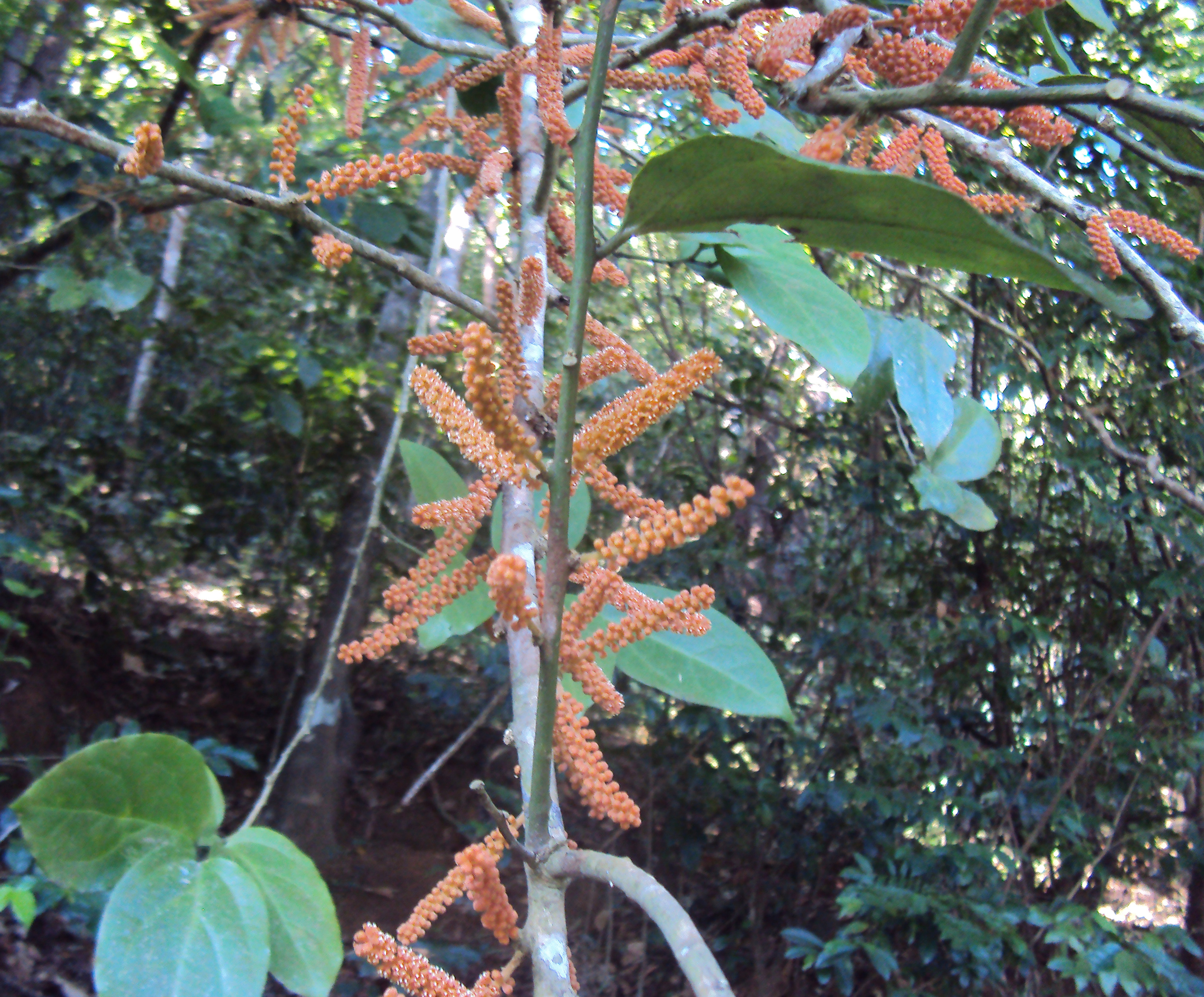
- Scleropyrum pentandrum

Scientific classification
- Kingdom: Plantae
- Clade: Tracheophytes
- Clade: Angiosperms
- Clade: Eudicots
- Order: Santalales
- Family: Santalaceae
- Genus: Scleropyrum; Arn.

Synonyms
- Heydia Dennst.; Scleromelum K.Schum. & Lauterb.

= Scleropyrum =

Genus of flowering plants

Scleropyrum is a genus of flowering plants in the family Santalaceae. It includes five species of evergreen small trees or shrubs native to tropical and subtropical Asia and New Guinea.

- Scleropyrum aurantiacum (K.Schum. & Lauterb.) Pilg.
- Scleropyrum brevistachyum Stauffer ex J.M.Macklin
- Scleropyrum leptostachyum Pilg.
- Scleropyrum maingayi Hook.f.
- Scleropyrum pentandrum (Dennst.) Mabb.

The genus was first described by George Arnott Walker Arnott in 1838.
