= Micrandra spruceana =

Conservation status
- Least Concern (IUCN 3.1)

Scientific classification
- Kingdom: Plantae
- Clade: Tracheophytes
- Clade: Angiosperms
- Clade: Eudicots
- Clade: Rosids
- Order: Malpighiales
- Family: Euphorbiaceae
- Genus: Micrandra
- Species: M. spruceana

Binomial name
- Micrandra spruceana (Baill.) R.E.Schult.

Synonyms
- Cunuria spruceana Baill.; Micrandra cunuri Baill. ex Müll.Arg.; Pogonophora cunuri Baill.

Species of tree

Micrandra spruceana is a species of tree in the family Euphorbiaceae. It is native to South America.
