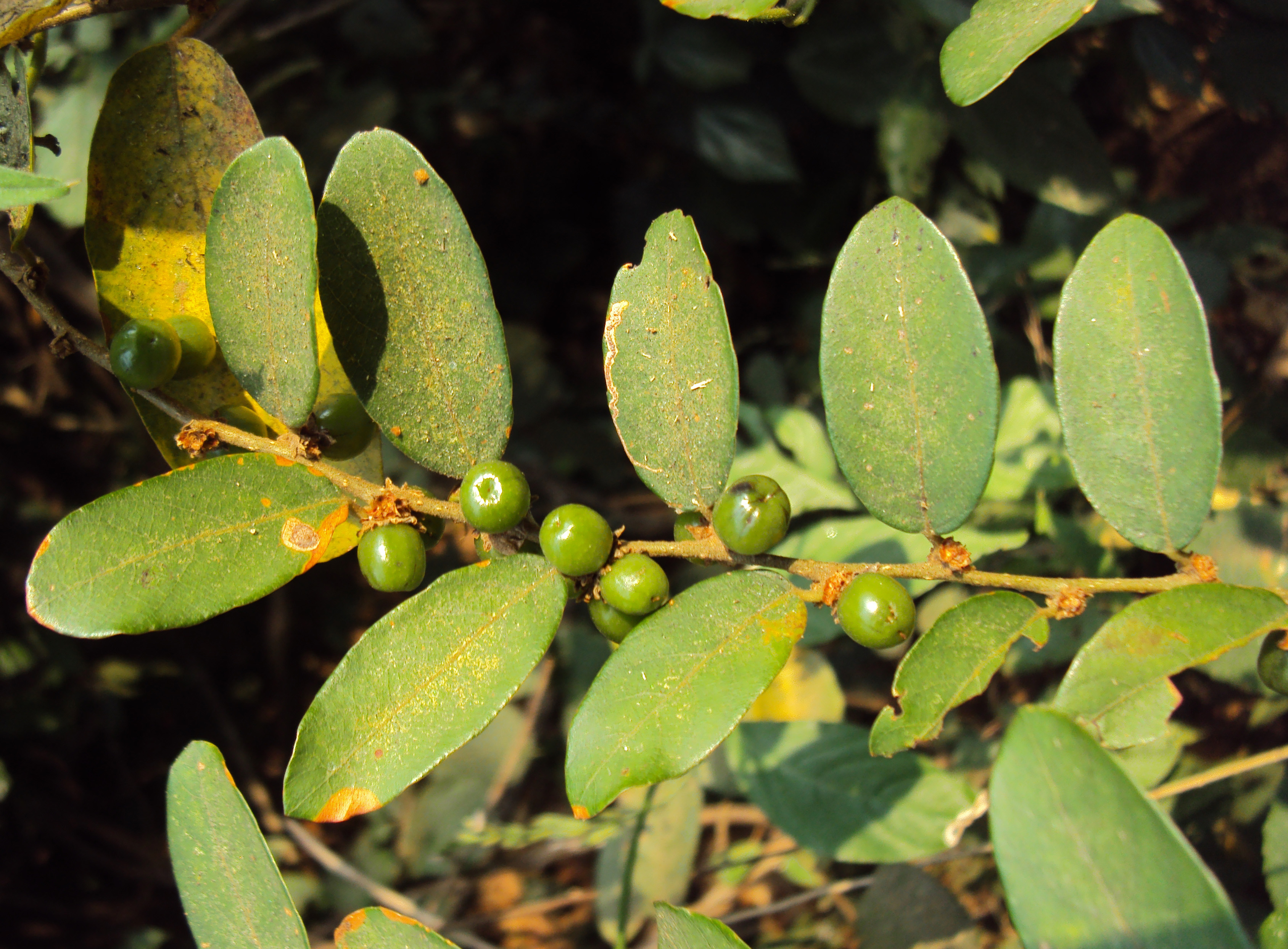
- Leaves and fruits

Scientific classification
- Kingdom: Plantae
- Clade: Tracheophytes
- Clade: Angiosperms
- Clade: Eudicots
- Clade: Rosids
- Order: Malpighiales
- Family: Phyllanthaceae
- Genus: Bridelia
- Species: B. stipularis

Binomial name
- Bridelia stipularis (L.) Blume

Synonyms
- Bridelia dasycalyx Kurz; Bridelia dasycalyx var. aridicola Kurz; Bridelia scandens (Roxb.) Willd.; Bridelia stipularis var. ciliata Gehrm.; Bridelia stipularis subsp. philippinensis Jabl.; Bridelia zollingeri Miq.; Clutia scandens Roxb.; Clutia stipularis L.; Ziziphus racemosa Wall.

= Bridelia stipularis =

Species of flowering plant

Bridelia stipularis is a perennial evergreen climber grows over hedges and bushes and sometimes on bigger trees. It is native to Southeast Asia, southern China, and the Indian subcontinent. Used as medicines in Malaysia and the Philippines. Bridelia stipularis, as other Bridelia species, used as food plants by the larvae of some Lepidoptera species including Endoclita malabaricus.
