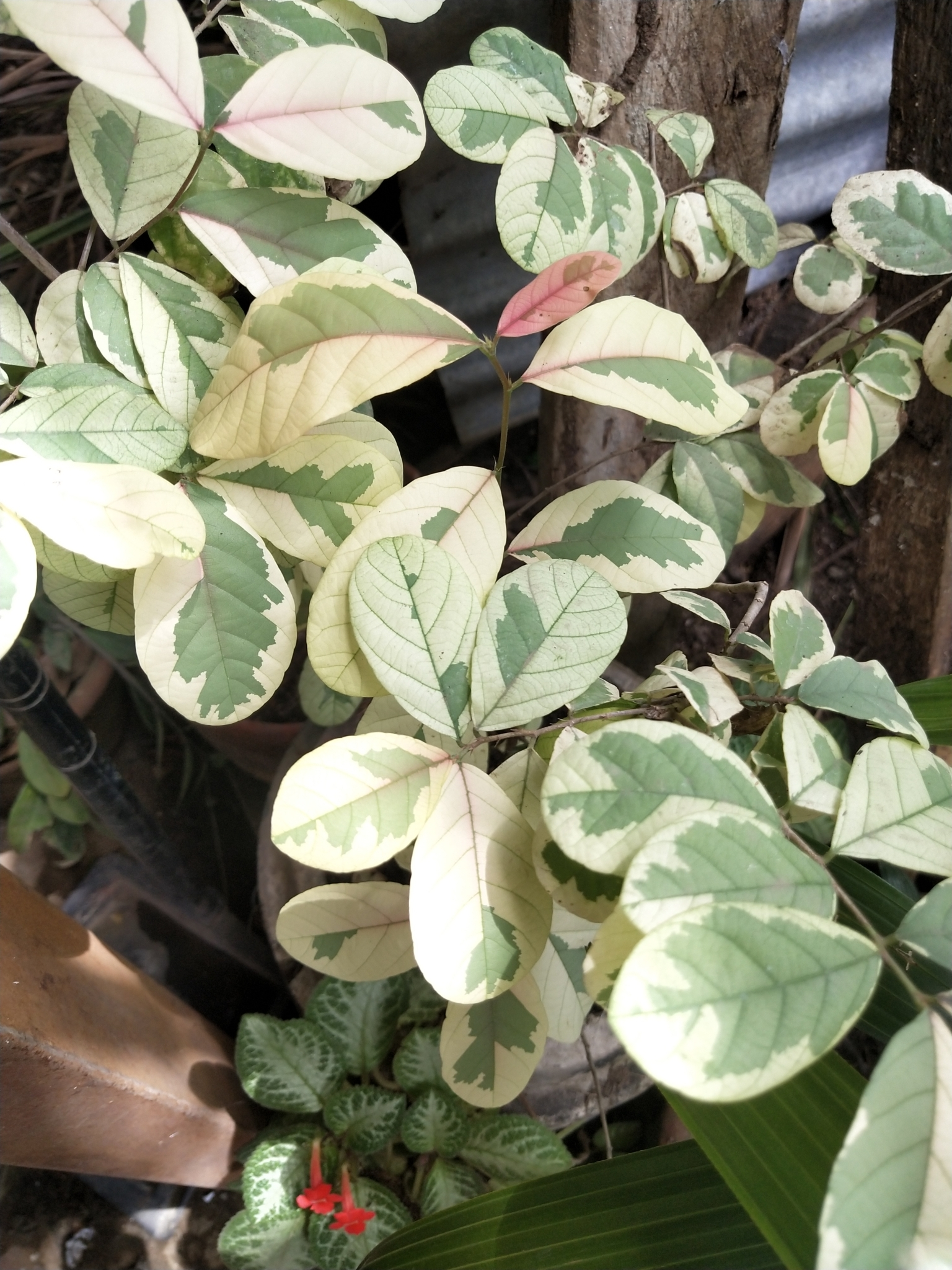
- Variegated variety of Bridelia ovata

Scientific classification
- Kingdom: Plantae
- Clade: Tracheophytes
- Clade: Angiosperms
- Clade: Eudicots
- Clade: Rosids
- Order: Malpighiales
- Family: Phyllanthaceae
- Genus: Bridelia
- Species: B. ovata

Binomial name
- Bridelia ovata Decne.

Synonyms
- Bridelia burmanica Hook.f.; Bridelia kurzii Hook.f.; Bridelia lanceolata Kurz ex Teijsm. & Binn.; Bridelia ovata var. acutifolia Müll.Arg.; Bridelia pedicellata Ridl.; Bridelia tomentosa var. oblonga Gehrm.; Cleistanthus lanceolatus (Kurz ex Teijsm. & Binn.) Müll.Arg.; Kaluhaburunghos lanceolatus (Kurz ex Teijsm. & Binn.) Kuntze

= Bridelia ovata =

Species of plant

Bridelia ovata is a species of flowering plant in the family Phyllanthaceae, native from Indo-China to west Malesia. It was first described by Joseph Decaisne in 1834.

== Distribution ==
Bridelia ovata is native to the Andaman Islands, Cambodia, Java, the Lesser Sunda Islands, Malaya, Myanmar, Sumatra, Thailand and Vietnam.

== Conservation ==
Bridelia kurzii was assessed as "vulnerable" in the 1998 IUCN Red List, where it is said to be native only to the Nicobar Islands and the Andaman Islands. As of February 2023, this species was regarded as a synonym of Bridelia ovata, which has a wider distribution.
