= Phyllanthus hohenackeri =

Conservation status
- Least Concern (IUCN 3.1)

Scientific classification
- Kingdom: Plantae
- Clade: Embryophytes
- Clade: Tracheophytes
- Clade: Angiosperms
- Clade: Eudicots
- Clade: Rosids
- Order: Malpighiales
- Family: Phyllanthaceae
- Genus: Phyllanthus
- Species: P. hohenackeri

Binomial name
- Phyllanthus hohenackeri Müll.Arg. (1865)

Varieties
- Phyllanthus hohenackeri var. hohenackeri; Phyllanthus hohenackeri var. johnstonei (Hook.f.) N.P.Balakr. & Chakr.

Synonyms
- Diasperus hohenacheri (Müll.Arg.) Kuntze (1891); Glochidion hohenackeri (Müll.Arg.) Bedd. (1873); synonyms of var. hohenackeri: Bridelia sinica J.Graham; Diasperus fagifolius (Müll.Arg.) Kuntze; Diasperus ralphii (Hook.f.) Kuntze; Glochidion fagifolium (Müll.Arg.) Miq. ex Bedd.; Glochidion hohenackeri var. kothayarense Jothi & Manickam; Glochidion ralphii Hook.f.; Phyllanthus fagifolius Müll.Arg.; Phyllanthus fagifolius var. caesius Müll.Arg.

Species of flowering plant

Phyllanthus hohenacheri is a species of flowering plant in the family Phyllanthaceae. It is a tree or shrub native to India and Myanmar.

Two varieties are accepted:

- Phyllanthus hohenackeri var. hohenackeri – India and Myanmar
- Phyllanthus hohenackeri var. johnstonei (Hook.f.) N.P.Balakr. & Chakr. – southwestern India
