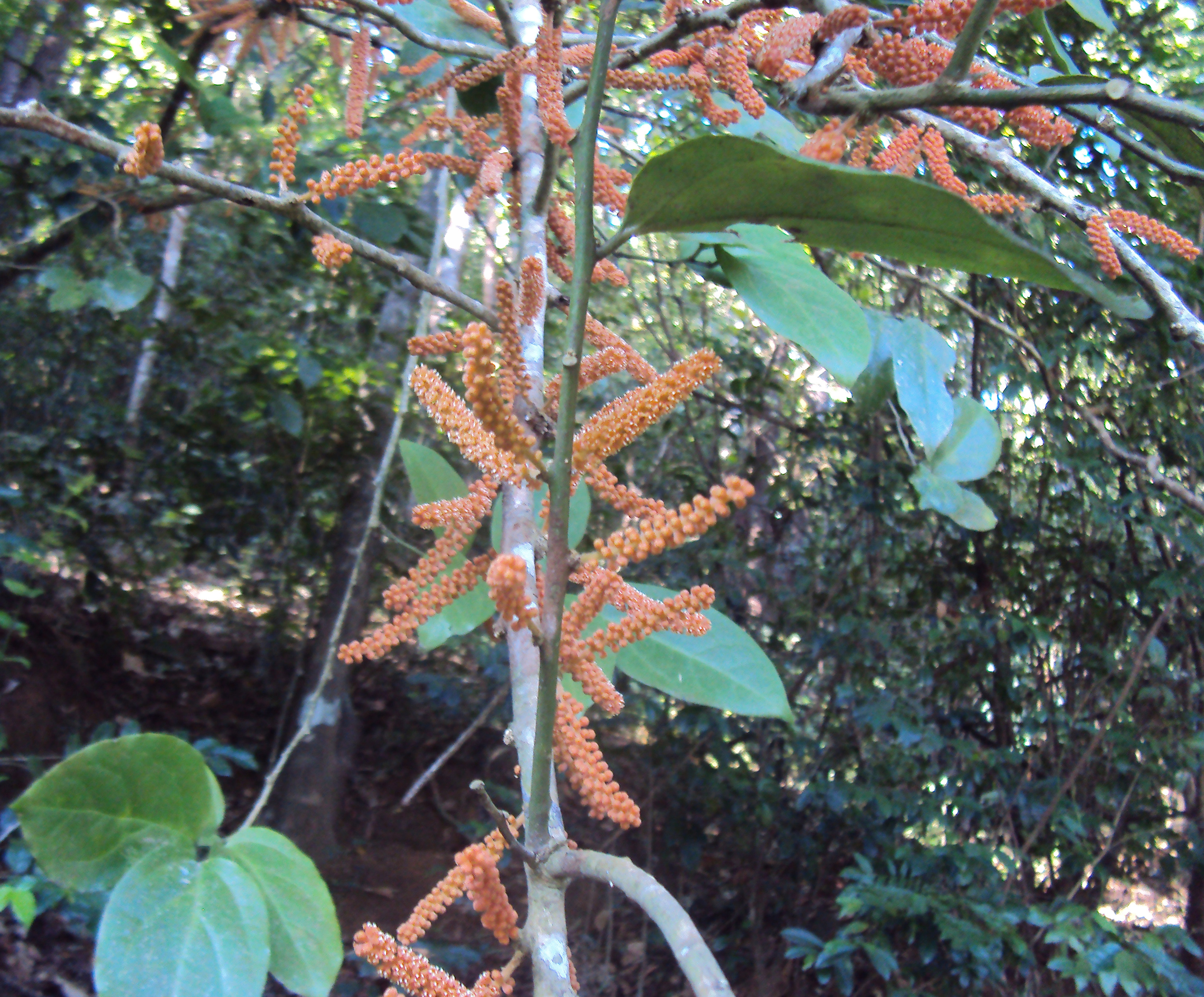

Conservation status
- Least Concern (IUCN 2.3)

Scientific classification
- Kingdom: Plantae
- Clade: Tracheophytes
- Clade: Angiosperms
- Clade: Eudicots
- Order: Santalales
- Family: Santalaceae
- Genus: Scleropyrum
- Species: S. pentandrum

Binomial name
- Scleropyrum pentandrum (Dennst.) Mabb.

Synonyms
- Synonymy: Antidesma parasiticum Dillwyn; Bridelia horrida Dillwyn; Champereia perrottetiana Baill.; Heydia horrida Dennst.; Myrobalanus indica Buch.-Ham. ex Steud.; Pothos pentandrus Dennst.; Pyrularia ceylanica A.DC.; Pyrularia moschifera (Blume) A.DC.; Pyrularia wallichiana A.DC.; Scleropyrum mekongense Gagnep.; Scleropyrum moschiferum (Blume) S.Moore; Scleropyrum ridleyi Gamble; Scleropyrum wallichianum Arn.; Scleropyrum wallichianum var. mekongense (Gagnep.) Lecomte; Scleropyrum wallichianum var. siamense Lecomte; Terminalia horrida Steud; Sphaerocarya moschifera Blume; Sphaerocarya wallichiana Wight & Arn.

= Scleropyrum pentandrum =

Species of flowering plant in the mistletoe family

Scleropyrum pentandrum is a species of flowering plant in family Santalaceae. It is an evergreen tree native to India and Sri Lanka, Indochina, southern China (Yunnan and Guangxi), Peninsular Malaysia, Java, and western New Guinea.
