= William Antônio Rodrigues =

Brazilian botanist

- Born: 1928; São João del Rei, Brazil
- Scientific career
- Fields: Botany
- Institutions: Universidade Federal do Paraná
- Author abbrev. (botany): W.A.Rodrigues

William Antônio Rodrigues (born 1928) is a Brazilian botanist.

Rodrigues was born in São João del Rei, Brazil in 1928. He was a faculty member of the Universidade Federal do Paraná.

He collected, and described plants from Brazil. Part of his research focused on Myristicaceae. He is the authority for at least 88 taxa including: IPNI. List of plant names with authority W.A.Rodrigues.
