= Cleistanthus oblongifolius =

Scientific classification
- Kingdom: Plantae
- Clade: Tracheophytes
- Clade: Angiosperms
- Clade: Eudicots
- Clade: Rosids
- Order: Malpighiales
- Family: Phyllanthaceae
- Tribe: Bridelieae
- Subtribe: Pseudolachnostylidinae
- Genus: Cleistanthus
- Species: C. oblongifolius

Binomial name
- Cleistanthus oblongifolius (Roxb.) Müll.Arg.

Synonyms
- List: Clutia oblongifolia Roxb. (Basionym); Nanopetalum myrianthum Hassk.; Kaluhaburunghos oblongifolius (Roxb.) Kuntze; Kaluhaburunghos nanopetalus Kuntze; Kaluhaburunghos myrianthus (Hassk.) Kuntze; Kaluhaburunghos chartaceus (Müll.Arg.) Kuntze; Cleistanthus pseudomyrianthus Jabl.; Cleistanthus pseudocanescens Elmer; Cleistanthus myrianthus var. spicatus; Cleistanthus myrianthus f. scortechinii; Cleistanthus myrianthus f. ovalis; Cleistanthus myrianthus subsp. cupreus; Cleistanthus myrianthus var. concinnus; Cleistanthus myrianthus subsp. attenuatus; Cleistanthus myrianthus (Hassk.) Kurz; Cleistanthus misamisensis C.B.Rob.; Cleistanthus mindanaensis C.B.Rob.; Cleistanthus cupreus Vidal; Cleistanthus chartaceus Müll.Arg.; Cleistanthus castus S.Moore; Cleistanthus apiculatus C.B.Rob.; Bridelia oblongifolius (Roxb.) Hook. & Arn.; Bridelia chartacea Wall.; Bridelia attenuata Wall. ex Voigt; Amanoa chartacea Baill. ex Müll.Arg.

Species of Asian tree

Cleistanthus oblongifolius is a species of Asian trees, originally described by William Roxburgh and later placed by Johannes Müller Argoviensis; it is now included in the family Phyllanthaceae.

Distributed throughout Indochina and Malesia, its name in Vietnam is cọc rào; it has been recorded from: the Andaman & Nicobar Islands, Australia (Queensland), Bangladesh, Borneo, Cambodia, Java, Lesser Sunda Islands, peninsular Malaysia, Maluku, Myanmar, New Guinea, Philippines, Solomon Islands, Sulawesi, Sumatera, Thailand and Vietnam.
