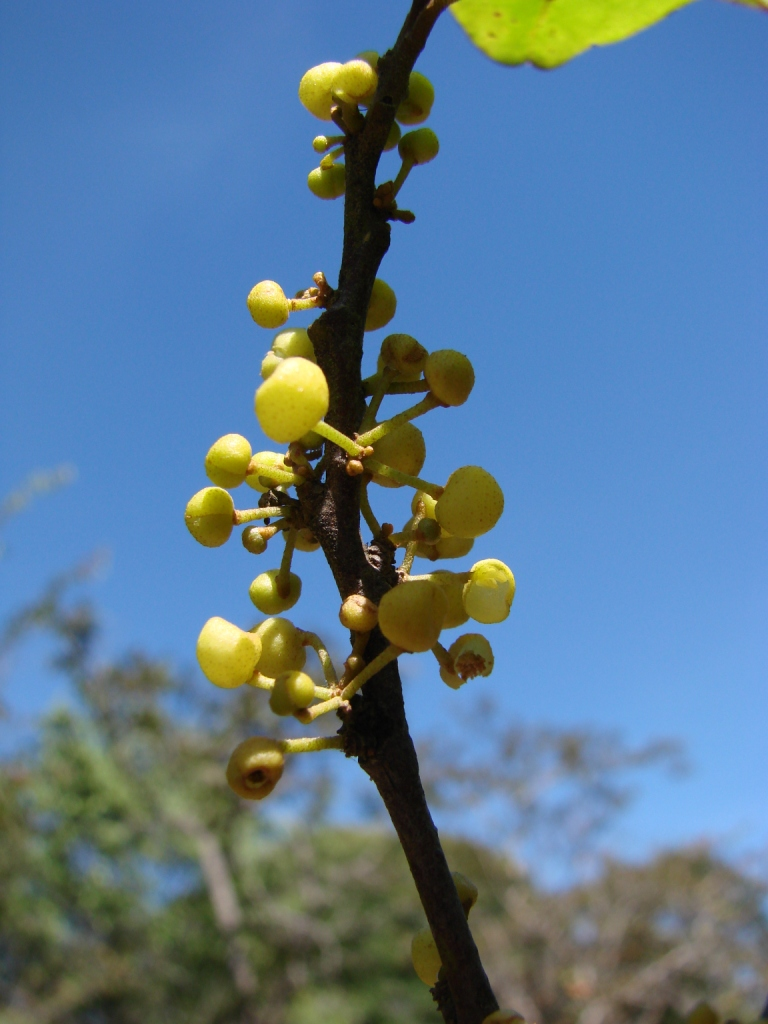
- Fruits of Pera glabrata

Scientific classification
- Kingdom: Plantae
- Clade: Tracheophytes
- Clade: Angiosperms
- Clade: Eudicots
- Clade: Rosids
- Order: Malpighiales
- Family: Peraceae; Klotzsch

Genera
- Chaetocarpus; Clutia; Pera; Pogonophora; Trigonopleura

= Peraceae =

Family of flowering plants

Peraceae Klotzsch is a family of flowering plants in the eudicot order Malpighiales. The family was segregated from the Euphorbiaceae by Johann Friedrich Klotzsch in 1859, and its uniqueness was affirmed by the Royal Botanic Gardens, Kew's Euphorbiaceae expert, Airy Shaw.

The family is accepted in APG IV (2016), but was not recognized in earlier Angiosperm Phylogeny Group III which considered that the recognition of the family may be necessary for a monophyletic Euphorbiaceae, but said that a formal recognition awaited additional molecular and morphological studies of the family.

The family includes 127 species in five genera: Chaetocarpus, Clutia, Pera, Pogonophora, and Trigonopleura, based on molecular and morphological characteristics.
