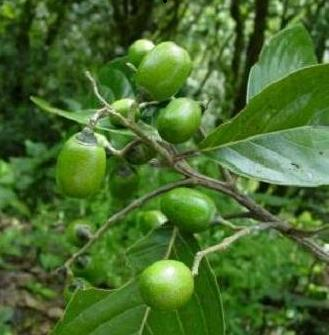
- Mezilaurus, Amazon river area, Peru.

Scientific classification
- Kingdom: Plantae
- Clade: Tracheophytes
- Clade: Angiosperms
- Clade: Magnoliids
- Order: Laurales
- Family: Lauraceae
- Genus: Mezilaurus; Kuntze ex Taub.

Species
- See text.

Synonyms
- Mezia Kuntze; Menestrata Vell.; Silvaea Meisn.

= Mezilaurus =

Genus of trees

Mezilaurus is a genus of plant in the family Lauraceae. It is a neotropical genus consisting of 18-27 species, mostly hardwood evergreen trees, occurring from Costa Rica to the southeast of Brazil (Werff 1987). Thirteen species have been identified in Brazil, distributed mostly in the Amazon region. In Rio de Janeiro state only M. navalium (Allemão) Taub. ex Mez has been recorded. Some species have been reported within the Cerrado and in semideciduous forest surrounding the Pantanal Matogrossense. The name Mezilaurus (half laurel) refers to its similar appearance to the genus Laurus.

The genus was described by Otto Kuntze ex Paul Hermann Wilhelm Taubert and published in Centralblatt Botanischer 50: 21 in 1892. The type species is Mezilaurus navalium (Allemão) Taub. Ex Mez. This genus is closely related to Licaria and Aiouea.

Mezilaurus are monoecious trees or shrubs with leaves alternate, usually congested at the apex of the branches, without papillae on the abaxial epidermis. The inflorescences are panicles with racemose terminations. The flowers are bisexual, with a hypanthium that is narrow at the top. Uncompressed below the tepals, 6 tepals are usually erect and equal, with the inner surface without papillae. There are three fertile stamens. Stamens of the third whorl are fertile. The fruit is black, sometimes domed. The cupula when present with pateliforme summit, small in relation to the fruit, the tepals are deciduous.

The fruit is a berry-like drupe. Seed dispersal is mostly by birds, though monkeys, porcupines and squirrels have also been observed eating the fruits.

This genus has some species of high commercial value, with few or no chemical or biological studies.

== Accepted species ==
23 species are accepted:

- Mezilaurus caatingae van der Werff
- Mezilaurus campaucola van der Werff
- Mezilaurus crassiramea (Meisn.) Taub. ex Mez
- Mezilaurus decurrens (Ducke) Kosterm.
- Mezilaurus duckei van der Werff
- Mezilaurus glabriantha F.M.Alves & V.C.Souza
- Mezilaurus introrsa F.M.Alves & van der Werff
- Mezilaurus itauba (Meissner) Taubert ex Mez
- Mezilaurus lindaviana Schwacke & Mez
- Mezilaurus manausensis van der Werff
- Mezilaurus micrantha van der Werff
- Mezilaurus microphylla F.M.Alves & V.C.Souza
- Mezilaurus navalium (Fr. Allem.) Taub.
- Mezilaurus opaca Kubitzki & van der Werff
- Mezilaurus palcazuensis van der Werff
- Mezilaurus pyriflora van der Werff
- Mezilaurus revolutifolia F.M.Alves & P.L.R.Moraes
- Mezilaurus sessiliflora P.L.R.Moraes & M.C.Vergne
- Mezilaurus sprucei (Meisn.) Taub. ex Mez
- Mezilaurus subcordata (Ducke) Kosterm.
- Mezilaurus synandra (Mez) Kosterm.
- Mezilaurus triunca van der Werff
- Mezilaurus vanderwerffii F.M.Alves & Baitello
