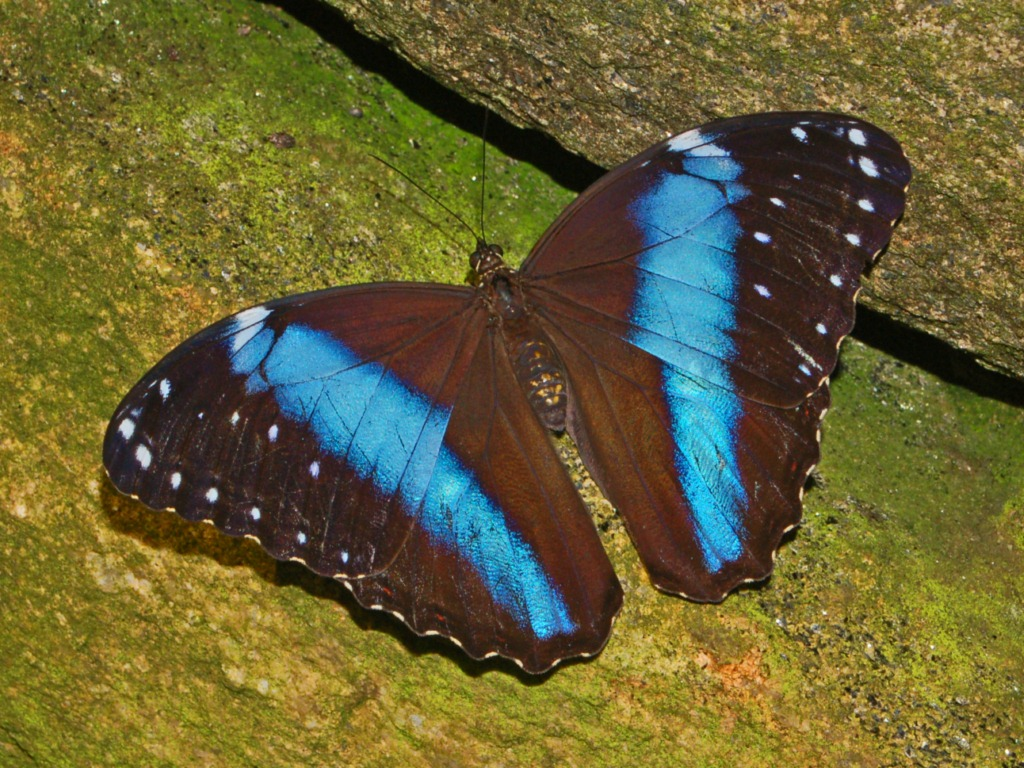

Scientific classification
- Kingdom: Animalia
- Phylum: Arthropoda
- Class: Insecta
- Order: Lepidoptera
- Family: Nymphalidae
- Genus: Morpho
- Species: M. achilles

Binomial name
- Morpho achilles (Linnaeus, 1758)

= Morpho achilles =

Species of butterfly

Morpho achilles, the Achilles morpho, blue-banded morpho, or banded blue morpho, is a Neotropical butterfly.

== Etymology ==
The genus name Morpho comes from the Greek epithet of Aphrodite, goddess of love. Achilles was a Greek hero of the Trojan War, the central character of Homer's Iliad.

== Description ==
In Morpho achilles patroclus, the dorsal sides of the forewings are black, with two broad vertical bands of brilliant blue. The undersides of the hindwings are olive brownish, with several ocelli formed by blue, yellow, and red concentric rings.

== Subspecies ==
- M. a. achilles (Linnaeus, 1758) – Brazil, Suriname, and Guyana
- M. a. agamedes Fruhstorfer, 1912 – Peru
- M. a. fischeri Weber, 1962 – Peru
- M. a. glaisi Le Moult & Réal, 1962 – Venezuela
- M. a. guaraunos Le Moult, 1925 – Venezuela
- M. a. guerrerensis Le Moult & Réal, 1962
- M. a. patroclus C. & R. Felder, 1861 – Colombia
- M. a. phokylides Fruhstorfer, 1912 – Venezuela, Colombia, Ecuador, Bolivia, Peru, and Brazil
- M. a. theodorus Fruhstorfer, 1907 – Ecuador
- M. a. vitrea Butler, 1866 – Bolivia

== Biology ==
The caterpillars feed on various species of climbing plants (Dalbergia, Inga, Machaerium, Machaerium aculeatum, Myrocarpus, Platymiscium, and Pterocarpus), while the adults mainly feed on rotting fruits or fermenting juice and tree sap.

== Distribution ==
This species can be found over a huge range of countries, particularly in Argentina, Suriname, Bolivia, Colombia, Peru, Ecuador, Venezuela, Paraguay, and Brazil.

== Gallery ==
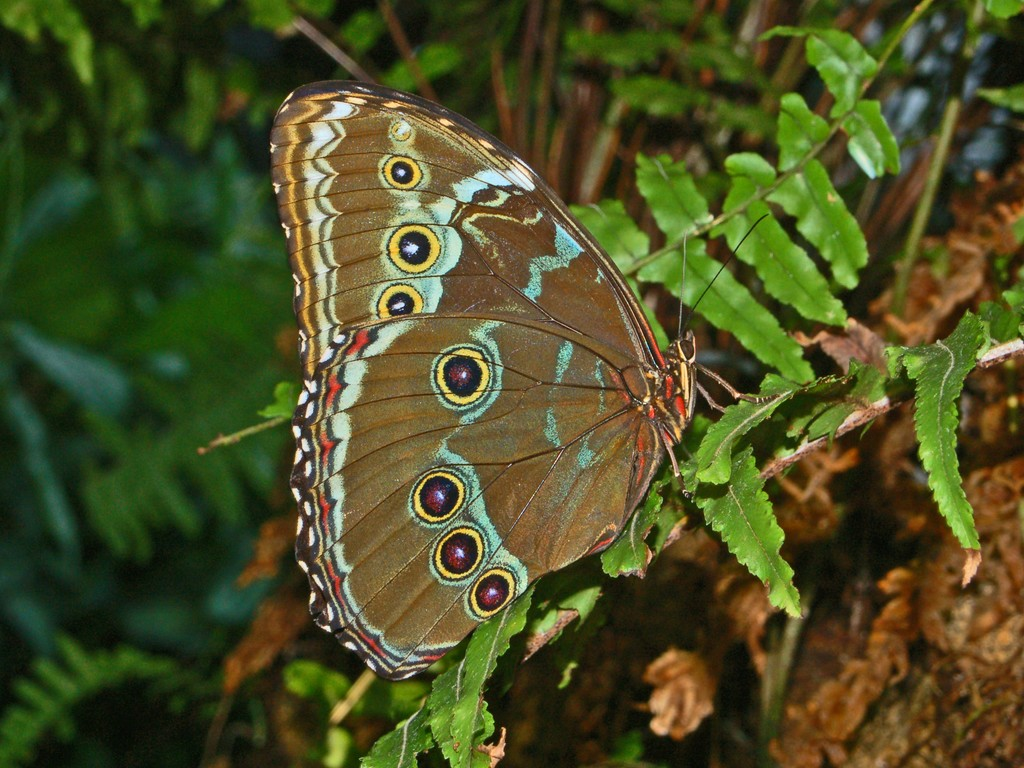
Ventral view

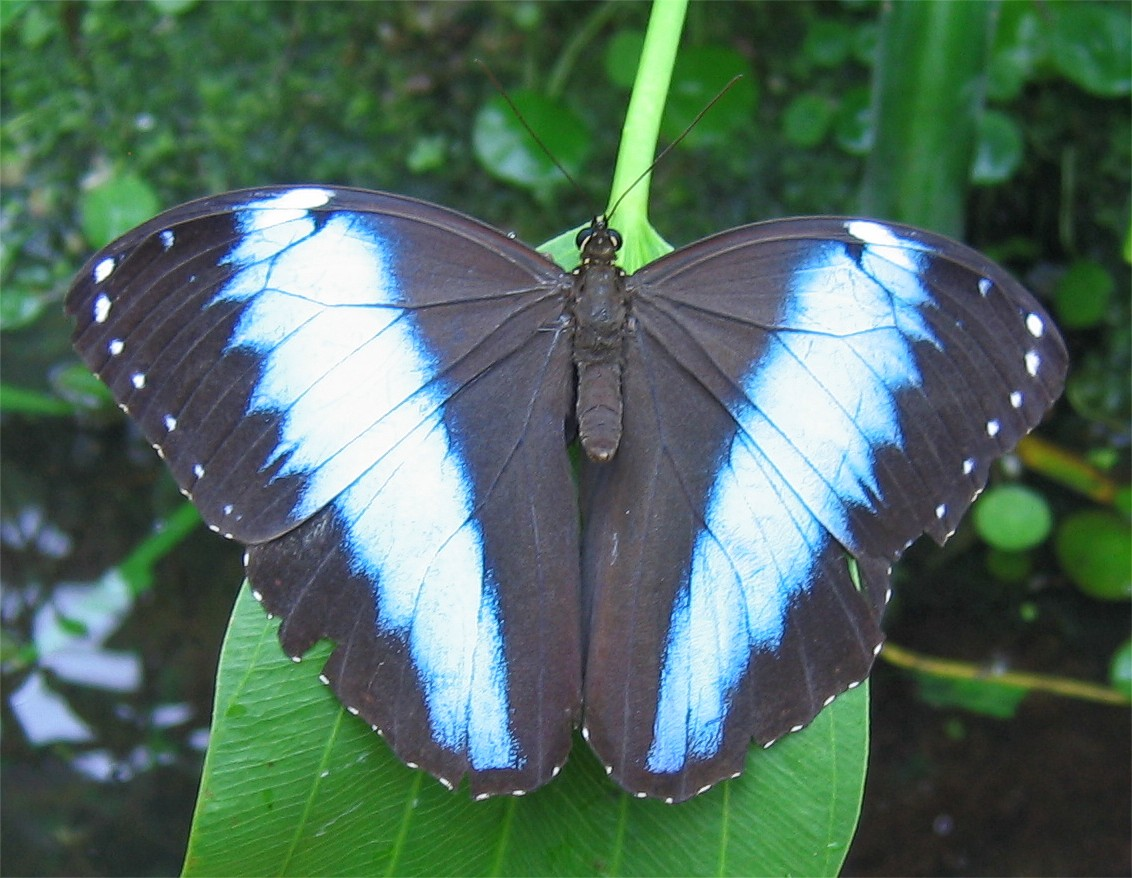
Dorsal view

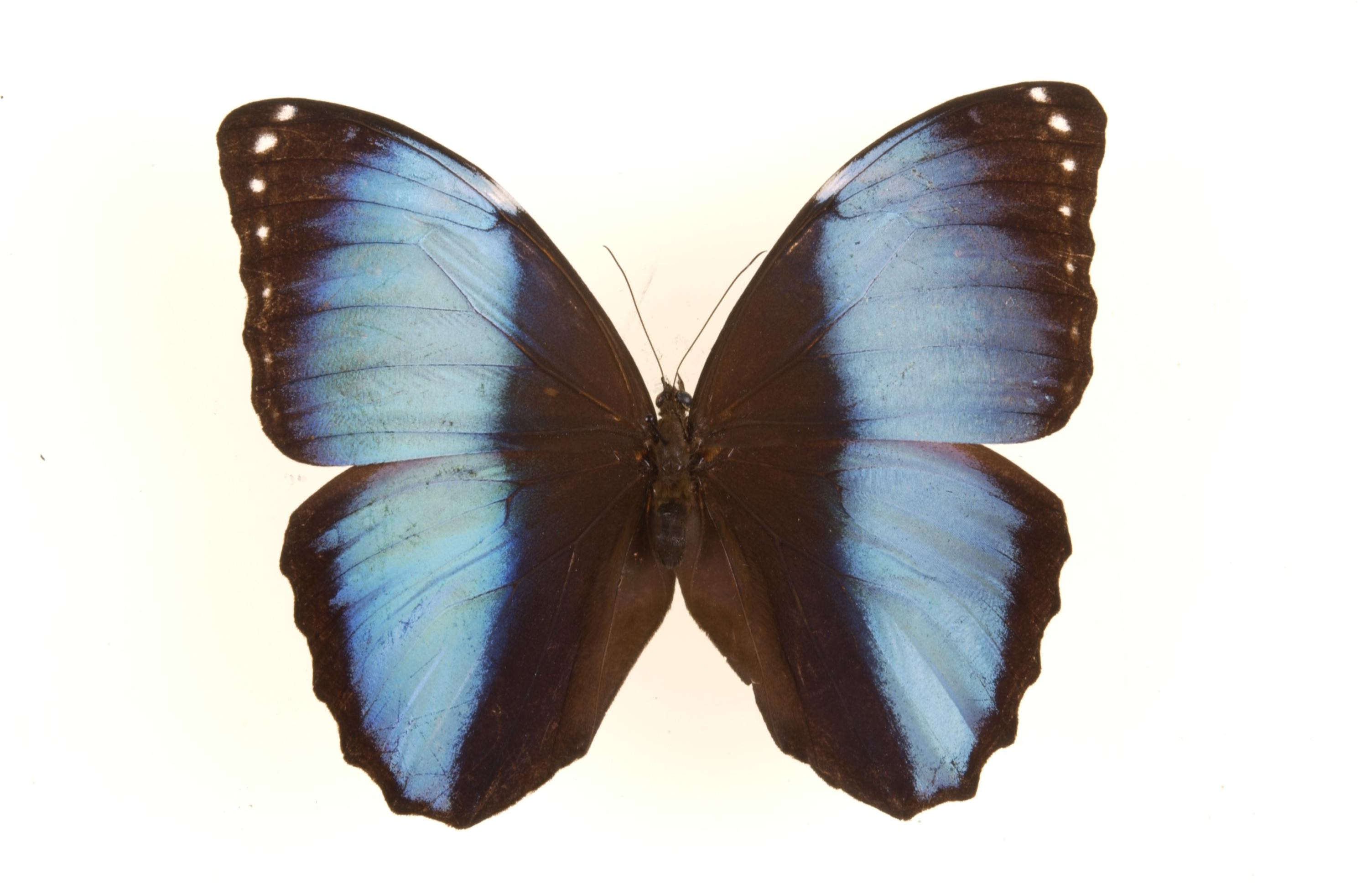
Museum specimen from Mato Grosso, Brazil

== See also ==
- Tropical Andes
