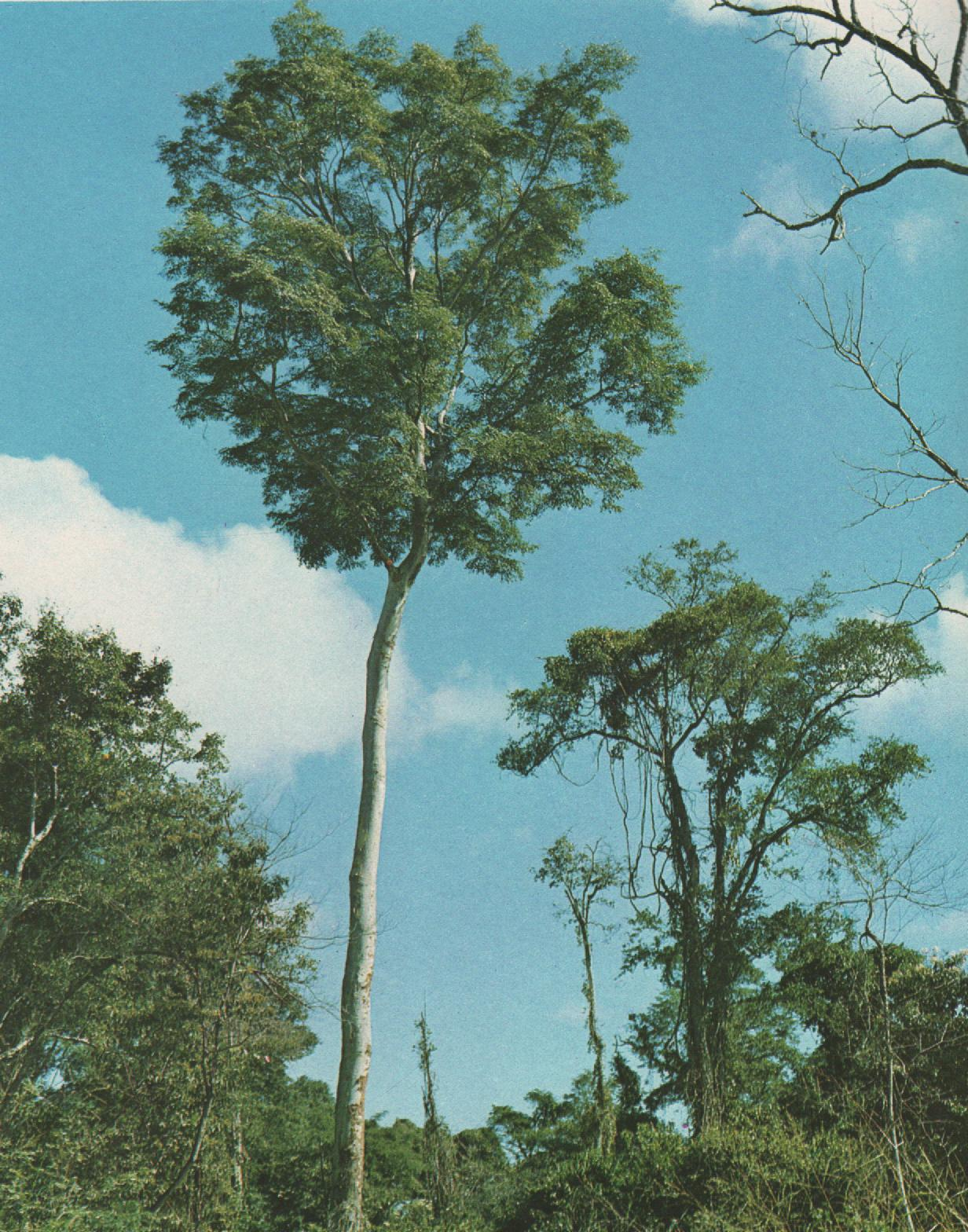
- Amburana cearensis

Scientific classification
- Kingdom: Plantae
- Clade: Tracheophytes
- Clade: Angiosperms
- Clade: Eudicots
- Clade: Rosids
- Order: Fabales
- Family: Fabaceae
- Subfamily: Faboideae
- Clade: ADA clade
- Tribe: Amburaneae; Nakai

Type genus
- Amburana Schwacke & Taub.

Genera
- See text

Synonyms
- Amburana clade; Amburaneae clade; Dussia group sensu Polhill, 1994; Myroxylon group sensu Polhill, 1994; Sophoreae sensu Polhill, 1981 pro parte 2; Swartzieae sensu Cowan, 1981 pro parte A

= Amburaneae =

Tribe of legumes

The tribe Amburaneae is one of the subdivisions of the plant family Fabaceae. It has been circumscribed to include the following genera, which used to be placed in tribes Sophoreae and Swartzieae:

- Amburana Schwacke & Taub.
- Cordyla Lour. (including Dupya)
- Dussia Krug & Urb. ex Taub.
- Mildbraediodendron Harms
- Myrocarpus Allemão
- Myrospermum Jacq.
- Myroxylon L.f.
- Petaladenium Ducke

This clade does not currently have a node-based, phylogenetic definition. It also lacks a clear morphological synapomorphy, however, members of the Amburaneae, as well as species found in its sister group, Dipterygeae, are known to produce a variety of resins (balsams, coumarins, etc.).
