= Tocorimé Pamatojari =

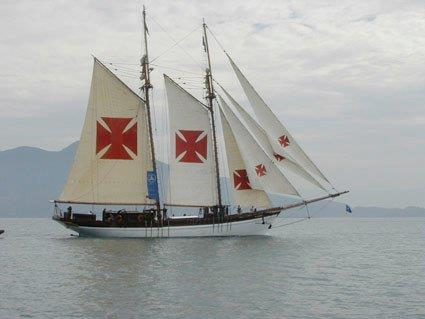
- Tallship Tocorimé Pamatojari in Brazil

History

Brazil
- Builder: Markus Lehmann, Markus Smit, Kit Smit, René de Bruijn
- Launched: 14 May 1999
- Status: in active service

General characteristics
- Length: 36 m (118 ft 1 in) o/a; 22.3 m (73 ft 2 in) lwl
- Beam: 7.1 m (23 ft 4 in)
- Draft: 3.1 m (10 ft 2 in)
- Mast heights: 30 m (98 ft 5 in) (from deck)
- Sail area: 550 m^{2} (5,900 sq ft)
- Speed: 10 knots (19 km/h; 12 mph) (engine); 14 knots (26 km/h; 16 mph) (under sail)
- Range: 2,000 nmi (3,700 km; 2,300 mi) (engine)
- Endurance: 60 days
- Crew: 8-16

Tocorimé Pamatojari is a Brazilian tall ship. Her name means 'The Adventurous Spirit of the number Fourteen', in the native tongue of the Kulina people of the Brazilian Amazon. The name is a tribute to the number 14 and a famous footballer Johan Cruijff.

Tocorimé Pamatojari was built in Santarém, Pará, Brazil. She was constructed using mainly age-old traditional & local Amazonian shipbuilding hand craft techniques. The hull is predominantly made from the Mezilaurus itauba wood.

The founders of the project were René Gerardus de Bruijn, Markus Lehmann (also known as Canoa), Christopher (Kit) & Markus Smit. Jaap Zondervan (logistics) and Will Hamm (music) completed the team.

Crafted with the greatest care and attention to detail and utilizing only the most traditional of hand tools, Tocorimé Pamatojari boldly exhibits its solid Itaúba ribs and planking. The massive and dense 22 metres (72 ft) ipê keel and keelson secure the vessel and the 30 metres (98 ft) Muiricatiara masts stand tall in the sky. Overall, there is a great diversity of tropical woods used in the construction because Tocorimé Pamatojari was built on the beachside of the Tapajós River. Tocorimé Pamatojari contains 2 kilometres (1.2 mi) of planking, 40,000 nails and screws, 40 tonnes of ballast, and 8 kilometres (5.0 mi) of rope.

After 6 years in construction, Tocorimé Pamatojari made her maiden voyage down the Amazon in March 2000.

Tocorimé Pamatojari is currently used as a school ship.
