= Francisco Freire Allemão e Cysneiro =

Brazilian botanist (1797–1874)

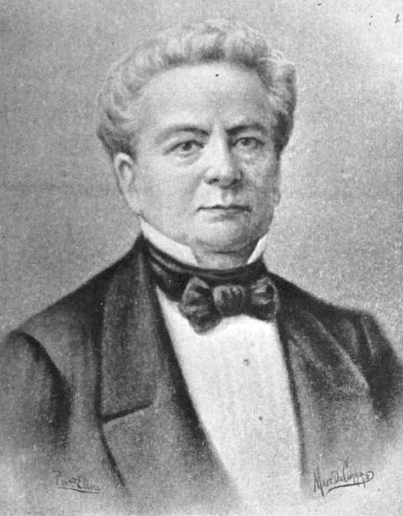
- Born: June 24, 1797; Rio de Janeiro, State of Brazil
- Died: November 24, 1874 (aged 77); Rio de Janeiro, Empire of Brazil
- Education: University of Paris
- Scientific career
- Fields: Botany
- Institutions: Brazilian National Museum
- Author abbrev. (botany): Allemão

Francisco Freire Allemão e Cysneiro (24 June 1797 – 11 November 1874) was a Brazilian botanist who collected in northeast Brazil and along the Rio de Janeiro. His association with the Brazilian National Museum in Rio de Janeiro took place at a time when Brazilian botany was dominated by foreigners.

Among his many duties as physician of the Brazilian court was to fetch the Emperor's bride from Italy.

Some genera and species named by him:

- Astronium urundeuva (Allemao) Engl.
- Myracrodruon urundeuva Fr. Allemão
- Acanthinophyllum strepitans Allemão (Moraceae)
- Amburana cearensis (Allemão) A.C.Sm. (Fabaceae) (synonym: Torresea cearensis Allemão)
- Andradea Allemão (Nyctaginaceae)
- Andradea floribunda Allemão
- Azeredia Arruda ex Allemão (Cochlospermaceae)
- Bumella sartarum Allemão (Sapotaceae)
- Azeredia pernambucana Allemão
- Chrysophyllum arenarium Allemão (Sapotaceae)
- Chrysophyllum cearaense Allemão = Chrysophyllum gonocarpum (Mart. & Eichler) Engl.
- Chrysophyllum cysneiri Allemão = Chrysophyllum gonocarpum (Mart. & Eichler) Engl.
- Chrysophyllum obtusifolium Allemão = Chrysophyllum gonocarpum (Mart. & Eichler) Engl.
- Chrysophyllum perfidum Allemão
- Chrysophyllum tomentosum Allemão
- Cordia oncocalyx Allemão (Boraginaceae)
- Dalbergia nigra Allemão ex Benth.(Fabaceae)
- Echyrospermum balthazarii Allemão ex Mart. (Fabaceae)
- Hyeronima Allemão (Euphorbiaceae)
- Hyeronima alchorneoides Allemão
- Jussiaea fluctuans Allemão & M.Allemão (Onagraceae)
- Lucuma meruocana Allemão (Sapotaceae)
- Lucuma minutiflora Allemão
- Lucuma montana Allemão
- Luetzelburgia auriculata (Allemão) Ducke (Fabaceae)
- Manilkara elata (Allemão ex Miq.) Monach. (synonym: Mimusops elata Allemão in Mart. ex Miq.)
- Mezia navalium Allemão (Lauraceae) (synonyms: Mezilaurus navalium (Allemão) Taub. ex Mez; Silvia navalium Allemão)
- Mimusops triflora Allemão (Sapotaceae)
- Miscolobium nigrum (Vell.) Allemão (Fabaceae)
- Moldenhawera speciosa Allemão (Fabaceae)
- Myrocarpus Allemão
- Ophthalmoblapton macrophyllum Allemão (Euphorbiaceae)
- Pinckneya viridiflora Allemão & Saldanh (Rubiaceae) (synonym: Simira viridiflora (Allem & Saldanha) Steyerm.; Sickingia viridiflora (Allemão & Saldanha) K.Schum.)
- Pterygota brasiliensis Allemão (Sterculiaceae)
- Ribeirea Allemão (Santalaceae)
- Ribeirea calophylla Allemão
- Ribeirea calva Allemão
- Ribeirea cupulata Allemão
- Ribeirea elliptica Allemão
- Tipuana auriculata Allemão (Fabaceae)
- Vatairea heteroptera (Allemão) F.A.Iglesias
- Vazea Allemão ex Mart. (Olacaceae)
- Zollernia mocitayba Allemão ex Emygdio (Caesalpiniaceae)
