= Itaubal =

Municipality in Amapá, Brazil

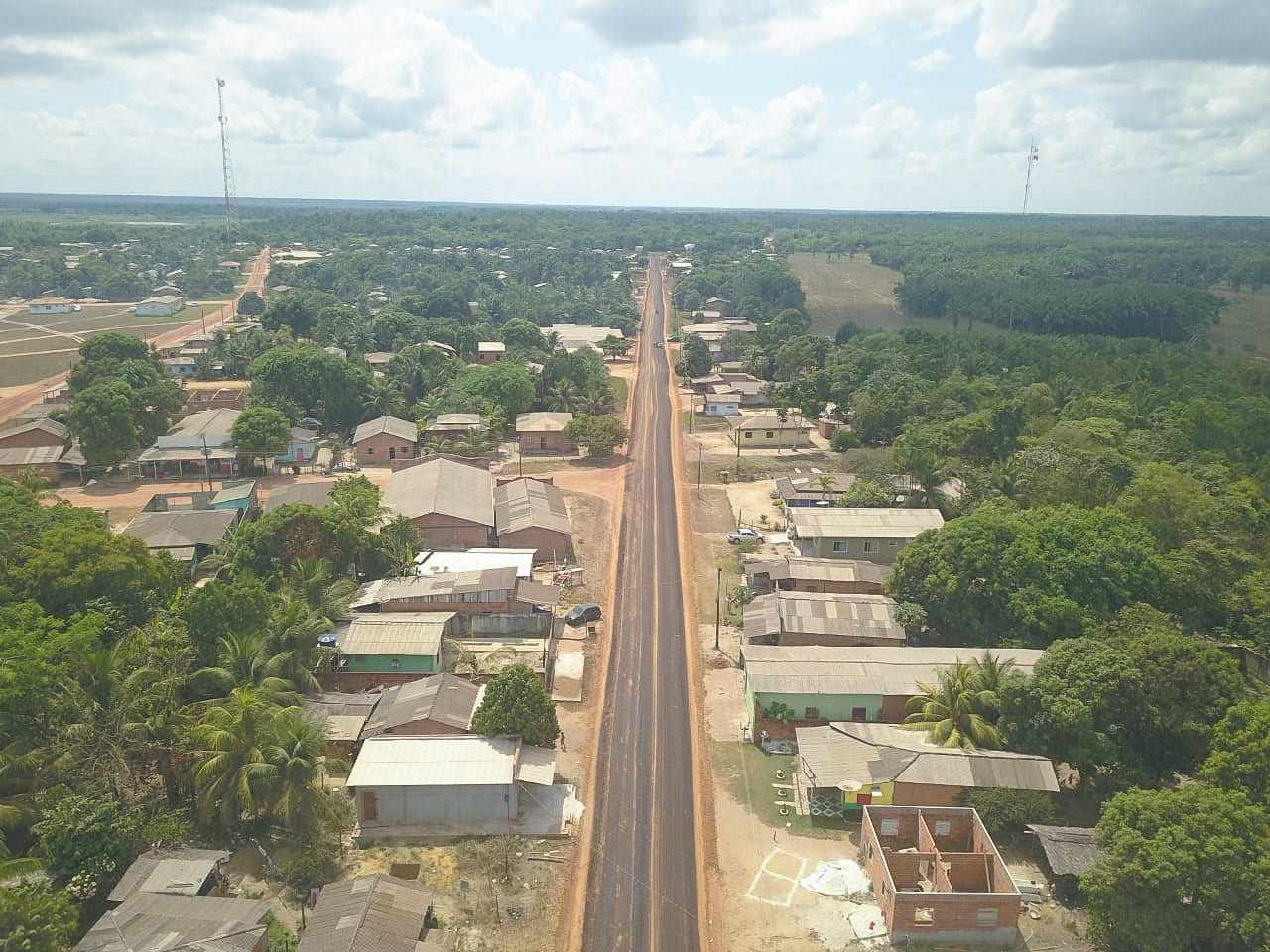

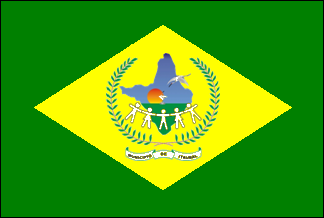
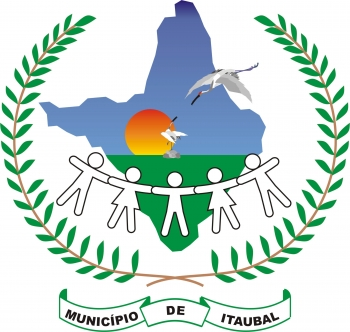
- Flag Seal

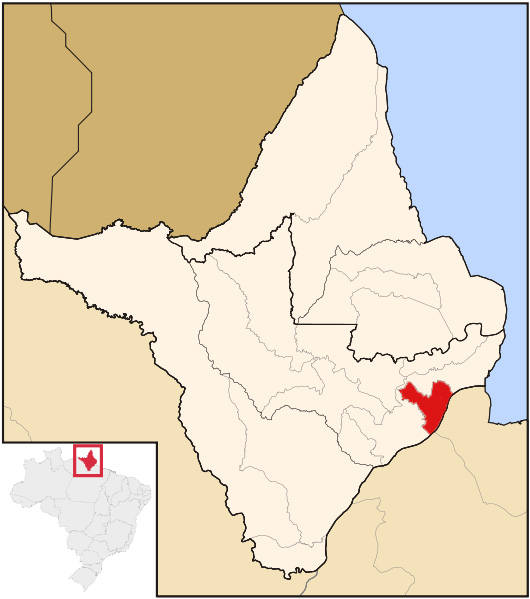
- Location of Itaubal in Amapá

- Location within Brazil
- Coordinates: 00°35′45″N 50°40′15″W
- Country: Brazil
- Region: North
- State: Amapá
- Established: 1 May 1992

Government
  - Mayor: Victor Hugo Lopes Rodrigues (PMDB)

Area
  - Total: 1,704 km^{2} (658 sq mi)
- Elevation: 8.11 m (26.6 ft)

Population (2020)
  - Total: 5,617
- Time zone: UTC-3

Itaubal (Brazilian Portuguese pronunciation: [itawˈbaw]), also Itaubal do Piririm, is a municipality located in the southeast of the state of Amapá, Brazil. Its population is 5,617, and its area is 1,704 square kilometres (658 mi^{2}). Itaubal is located 112 kilometres (70 mi) from the state capital of Macapá.

== History ==
Itaubal was built on the right bank of the Piririm River. First reports of habitation date from 1935. In 1940, more migrants settled in the village. In 1992, it became an independent municipality. The economy is based on forestry, subsistence farming and livestock.

It takes its name from the itaúba (Mezilaurus itauba), a valuable species of laurel. The tree was once found in great abundance in the region but is now endangered. Itaubal is bordered to the southeast by the delta of the Amazon River, and it is surrounded by Macapá to the southwest, west, and north.

== Climate ==
This city has a tropical monsoon climate (Köppen: Am). The wet season, typically occurring during February, is marked by heavy rainfall and high humidity.

== See also ==
- List of municipalities in Amapá
