= Droogmansia megalantha =

Scientific classification
- Kingdom: Plantae
- Clade: Tracheophytes
- Clade: Angiosperms
- Clade: Eudicots
- Clade: Rosids
- Order: Fabales
- Family: Fabaceae
- Subfamily: Faboideae
- Genus: Droogmansia
- Species: D. megalantha

Binomial name
- Droogmansia megalantha (Taub.) De Wild.

Synonyms
- Desmodium huillensis Welw.; Desmodium megalanthum Taub.; Droogmansia huillensis (Hiern) De Wild.; Meibomia huillensis Hiern; Meibomia megalantha (Taub.) Hiern

Species of plant

Droogmansia megalantha is a plant in the legume family Fabaceae, native to southern tropical Africa.

== Description ==
Droogmansia megalantha grows as a shrub up to 1 metre (3 ft) tall. The elliptic or oblong leaves measure up to 12 cm (5 in) long and are glabrescent to pilose. Inflorescences measure up to 35 cm (14 in) long and have many flowers with bright red petals. The oblong or elliptic fruits are hairy and yellowish and measure up to 3.5 cm (1 in) long.

== Distribution and habitat ==
Droogmansia megalantha is native to Angola and Zambia. Its habitat is in woodland.
