= Motilon =

Motilon, or Motilón may refer to:

- Motilón people, an ethnic group of Colombia
- Motilón language
- Motilon (beetle), a genus of insects in the subfamily Prioninae
- Hieronyma macrocarpa, also known as motilón in Spanish, a species of tree
