= Cordyla somalensis =

Conservation status
- Near Threatened (IUCN 2.3)

Scientific classification
- Kingdom: Plantae
- Clade: Tracheophytes
- Clade: Angiosperms
- Clade: Eudicots
- Clade: Rosids
- Order: Fabales
- Family: Fabaceae
- Subfamily: Faboideae
- Genus: Cordyla
- Species: C. somalensis

Binomial name
- Cordyla somalensis J.B.Gillett

Species of legume

Cordyla somalensis is a species of flowering plant in the family Fabaceae. It is found only in Somalia.
