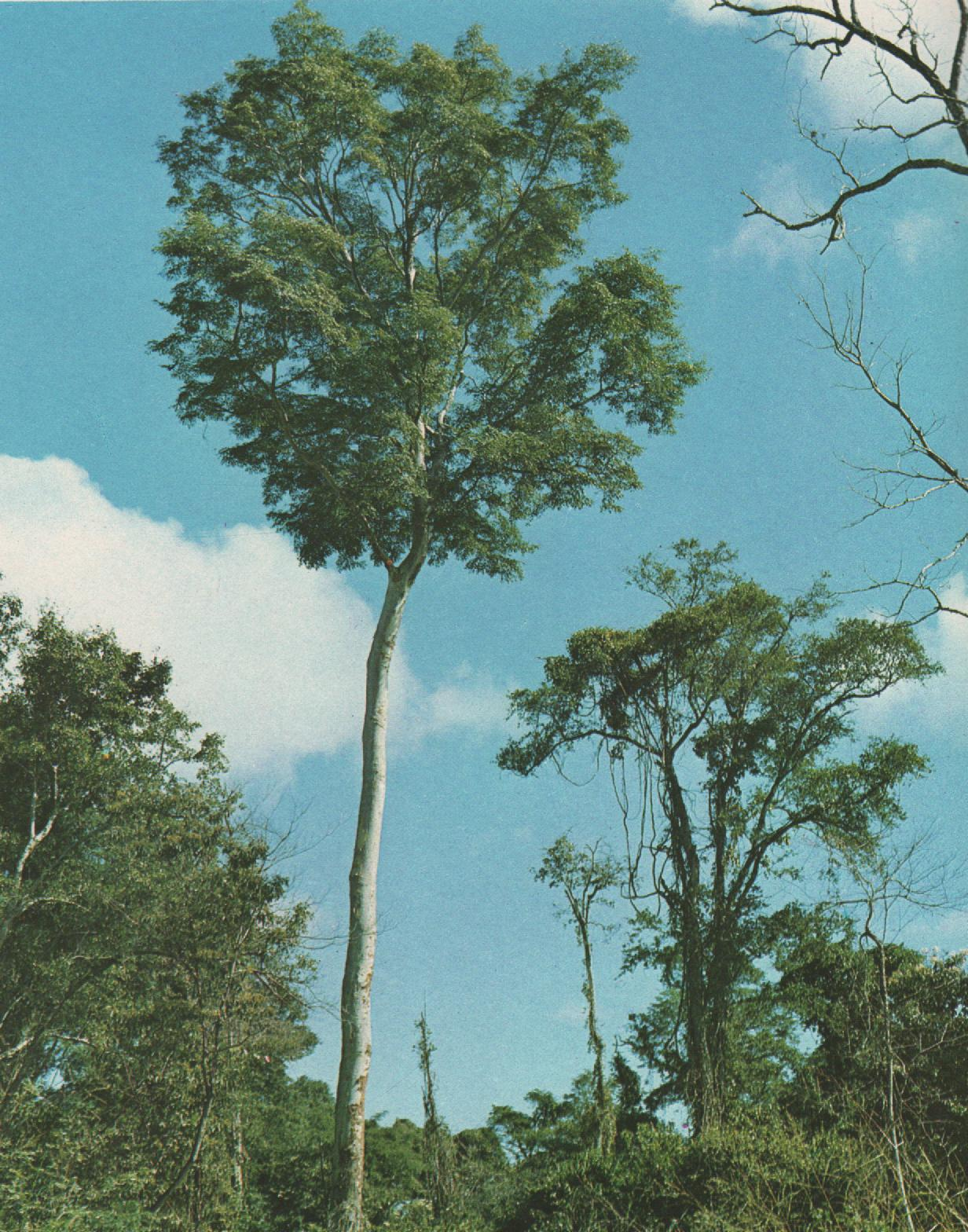
- Amburana cearensis

Scientific classification
- Kingdom: Plantae
- Clade: Embryophytes
- Clade: Tracheophytes
- Clade: Spermatophytes
- Clade: Angiosperms
- Clade: Eudicots
- Clade: Rosids
- Order: Fabales
- Family: Fabaceae
- Subfamily: Faboideae
- Tribe: Amburaneae
- Genus: Amburana; Schwacke & Taubert (1894)

Species
- Amburana acreana (Ducke) A.C.Sm.; Amburana cearensis (Allemão) A.C.Sm.; Amburana erythrosperma Seleme, C.H.Stirt. & Mansano

Synonyms
- Torresea Allemão

= Amburana =

Genus of legumes

Amburana is a genus of legume in the family Fabaceae. It contains three species, which are native to Brazil, Peru, Bolivia, Paraguay, and northwestern Argentina.

- Amburana acreana (Ducke) A.C.Sm. – Peru and Bolivia to northern and southeastern Brazil
- Amburana cearensis (Allemão) A.C.Sm. — Umburana do Cheiro – Brazil, Bolivia, Paraguay, and northwestern Argentina
- Amburana erythrosperma Seleme, C.H.Stirt. & Mansano – Brazil (Bahia)
