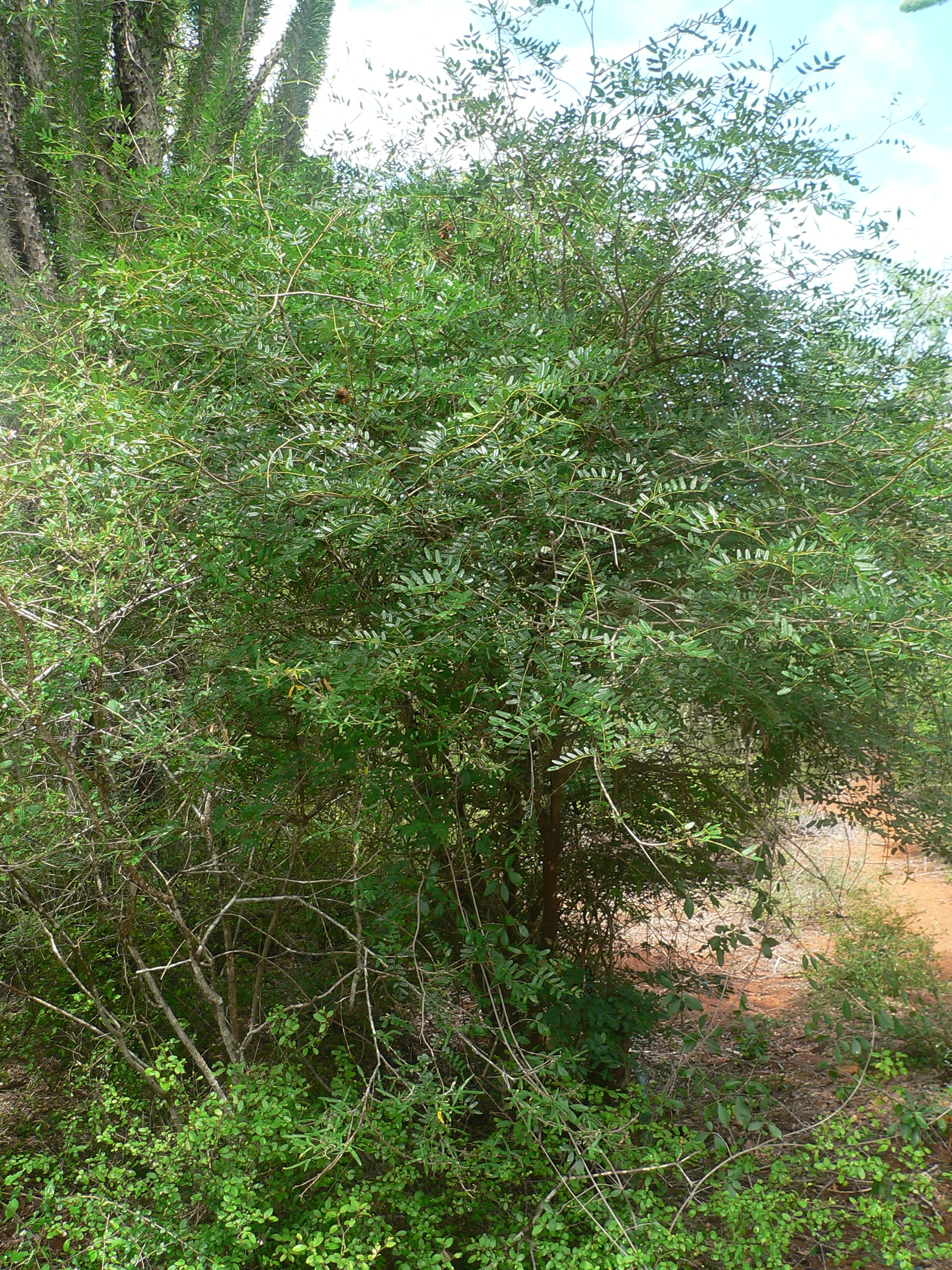

Conservation status
- Least Concern (IUCN 3.1)

Scientific classification
- Kingdom: Plantae
- Clade: Tracheophytes
- Clade: Angiosperms
- Clade: Eudicots
- Clade: Rosids
- Order: Fabales
- Family: Fabaceae
- Subfamily: Faboideae
- Genus: Cordyla
- Species: C. madagascariensis

Binomial name
- Cordyla madagascariensis R.Vig.

Subspecies
- Cordyla madagascariensis subsp. madagascariensis; Cordyla madagascariensis subsp. tamarindoides (Capuron) Du Puy & Labat

Synonyms
- Dupuya madagascariensis (R.Vig.) J.H.Kirkbr.

= Cordyla madagascariensis =

Species of legume

Cordyla madagascariensis, synonym Dupuya madagascariensis, is a species of legume in the family Fabaceae. It is endemic to Madagascar.
