= Hieronyma crassistipula =

Conservation status
- Critically Endangered (IUCN 3.1)

Scientific classification
- Kingdom: Plantae
- Clade: Tracheophytes
- Clade: Angiosperms
- Clade: Eudicots
- Clade: Rosids
- Order: Malpighiales
- Family: Phyllanthaceae
- Genus: Hieronyma
- Species: H. crassistipula

Binomial name
- Hieronyma crassistipula Urb.

Synonyms
- Hieronima crassistipula Urb. (orth.var.); Hyeronima crassistipula Urb. (orth.var.)

Species of flowering plant

Hieronyma crassistipula is a species of plant in the family Phyllanthaceae, which was recently separated from the Euphorbiaceae. It is a tree endemic to Cuba's Isla de la Juventud.

It is native to gallery forests growing on quartzite sand from 5 to 15 meters elevation. It is an extremely rare plant, with fewer than 50 mature individuals known from three locations. It is threatened by habitat loss from deforestation and non-native invasive plants. The IUCN Red List assesses the species as Critically Endangered.
