= Hieronyma jamaicensis =

Conservation status
- Vulnerable (IUCN 2.3)

Scientific classification
- Kingdom: Plantae
- Clade: Tracheophytes
- Clade: Angiosperms
- Clade: Eudicots
- Clade: Rosids
- Order: Malpighiales
- Family: Phyllanthaceae
- Genus: Hieronyma
- Species: H. jamaicensis

Binomial name
- Hieronyma jamaicensis Urb.

Synonyms
- Hieronima jamaicensis Urban (orth.var.); Hyeronima jamaicensis Urban (orth.var.)

Species of flowering plant

Hieronyma jamaicensis is a plant species in the family Phyllanthaceae ( recently separated from Euphorbiaceae). that is endemic to Jamaica and threatened by habitat loss.
