= Manilkara elata =

Conservation status
- Endangered (IUCN 2.3)

Scientific classification
- Kingdom: Plantae
- Clade: Tracheophytes
- Clade: Angiosperms
- Clade: Eudicots
- Clade: Asterids
- Order: Ericales
- Family: Sapotaceae
- Genus: Manilkara
- Species: M. elata

Binomial name
- Manilkara elata (Allemão ex Miq.) Monach.

Synonyms
- Mimusops elata Allemão in Mart. ex Miq.

Species of tree

Manilkara elata, also called the cow tree, is a species of plant in the family Sapotaceae. It is Endemic to the Amazon region in Brazil, where it is endangered by habitat loss.

== Uses ==
The edible fruit resembles small apples, and its flesh has a creamy, milk-like texture, which gave the tree its name. It is commonly sold by vendors in the Brazilian state of Pará. Indigenous peoples of the Amazon drink the milk exuded from the tree's bark.

The wood is very hard and heavy, with a normal amount of pores. It is extremely durable and highly resistant to insect damage and rotting.
