= Mildbraediodendron =

Scientific classification
- Kingdom: Plantae
- Clade: Tracheophytes
- Clade: Angiosperms
- Clade: Eudicots
- Clade: Rosids
- Order: Fabales
- Family: Fabaceae
- Subfamily: Faboideae
- Tribe: Amburaneae
- Genus: Mildbraediodendron; Harms (1911)
- Species: M. excelsum

Binomial name
- Mildbraediodendron excelsum Harms (1911)

Synonyms
- Mildbraediodendron excelsa Harms

Genus of legumes

Mildbraediodendron excelsum is a species of flowering plant in the family Fabaceae, and the only species in the genus Mildbraediodendron. It is a tree native to sub-Saharan Africa, ranging from Ghana to South Sudan, Uganda, and Democratic Republic of the Congo. It grows in Guineo-Congolian forest and Victoria Basin forest–savanna mosaic. It belongs to the subfamily Faboideae.

It is a tall forest tree with buttresses, a straight trunk, and spreading crown. It is deciduous, with leaves that reappear with flowers.

The genus was named in honor of the German botanist Johannes Mildbraed.
