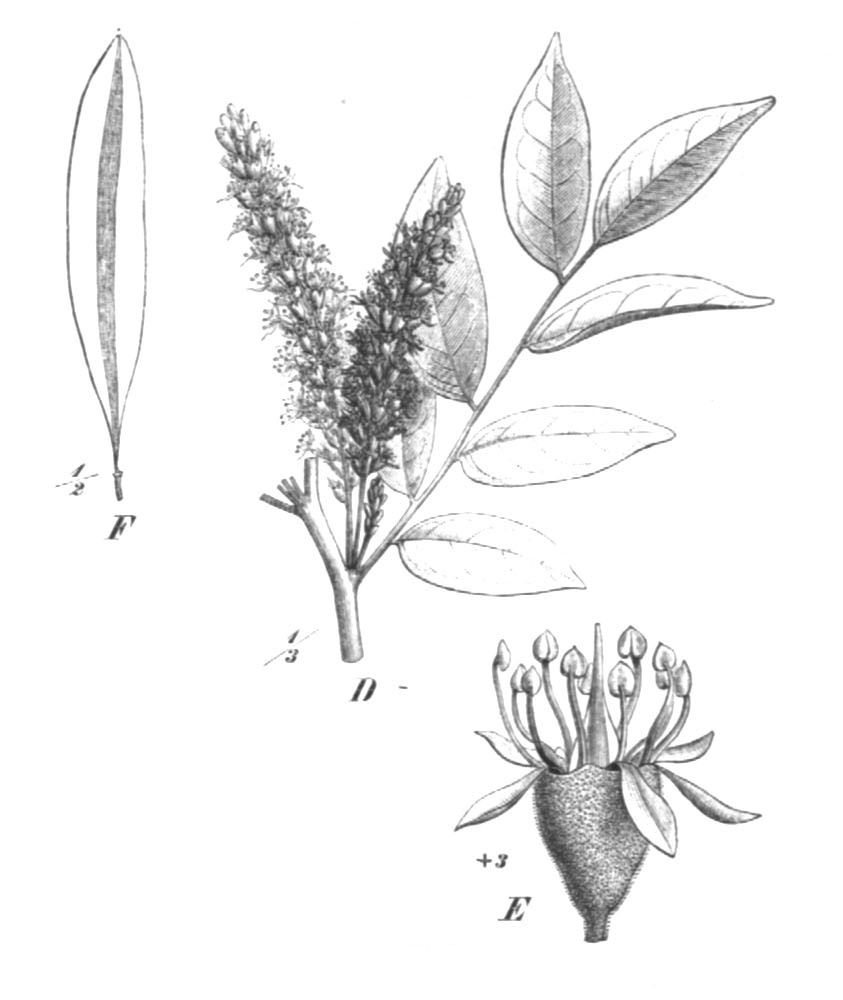

Conservation status
- Data Deficient (IUCN 2.3)

Scientific classification
- Kingdom: Plantae
- Clade: Tracheophytes
- Clade: Angiosperms
- Clade: Eudicots
- Clade: Rosids
- Order: Fabales
- Family: Fabaceae
- Subfamily: Faboideae
- Genus: Myrocarpus
- Species: M. frondosus

Binomial name
- Myrocarpus frondosus Fr. Allem

= Myrocarpus frondosus =

Species of legume

Myrocarpus frondosus, the ibirá-payé, incienso, cabreúva or qu, is a species of flowering plant in the family Fabaceae. It is found in Argentina, Brazil, and Paraguay. It is threatened by habitat loss.
