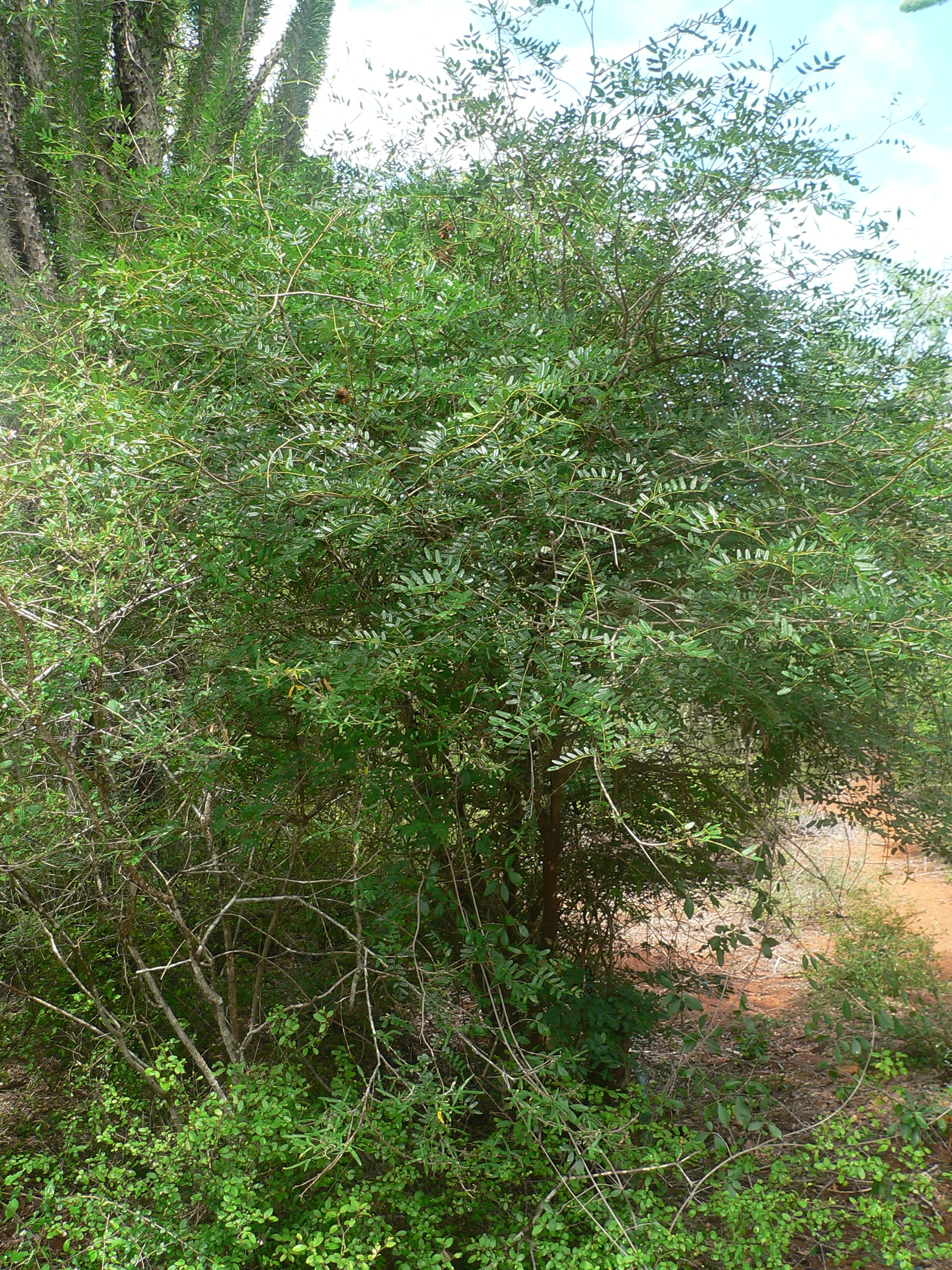
- Cordyla madagascariensis

Scientific classification
- Kingdom: Plantae
- Clade: Tracheophytes
- Clade: Angiosperms
- Clade: Eudicots
- Clade: Rosids
- Order: Fabales
- Family: Fabaceae
- Subfamily: Faboideae
- Tribe: Amburaneae
- Genus: Cordyla; Lour.

Species
- 7; see text

Synonyms
- Calycandra Lepr. ex A.Rich. (1831); Dupuya J.H.Kirkbr. (2005)

= Cordyla =

Genus of legumes

Cordyla is a genus of flowering plants in the family Fabaceae. It includes seven species native to sub-Saharan Africa, ranging across northern Africa from Senegal to Somalia, and through eastern Africa from Sudan to KwaZulu-Natal, including Madagascar.

== Species ==
As of April 2023, seven species were accepted:

- Cordyla africana Lour. – A tree native to eastern Africa from Kenya to KwaZulu-Natal
- Cordyla densiflora Milne-Redh. – a tree endemic to Tanzania
- Cordyla haraka Capuron – a tree endemic to eastern Madagascar
- Cordyla madagascariensis R.Vig. – a tree endemic to Madagascar
- Cordyla pinnata (A. Rich.) Milne-Redh. – a tree native to western Africa from Senegal to Chad
- Cordyla richardii Milne-Redh. – a shrub or tree native to South Sudan and northern Uganda
- Cordyla somalensis J.B. Gillett – a shrub or tree native to Ethiopia and Somalia
