= Amburana acreana =

Conservation status
- Vulnerable (IUCN 2.3)

Scientific classification
- Kingdom: Plantae
- Clade: Tracheophytes
- Clade: Angiosperms
- Clade: Eudicots
- Clade: Rosids
- Order: Fabales
- Family: Fabaceae
- Subfamily: Faboideae
- Genus: Amburana
- Species: A. acreana

Binomial name
- Amburana acreana (Ducke) A.C.Sm.

Synonyms
- Amburana cearensis var. acreana (Ducke) J.F.Macbr. Torresea acreana Ducke

Species of legume

Amburana acreana is a species of legume in the family Fabaceae. It is found in Bolivia, Brazil, and Peru. Its main threat is habitat loss.
