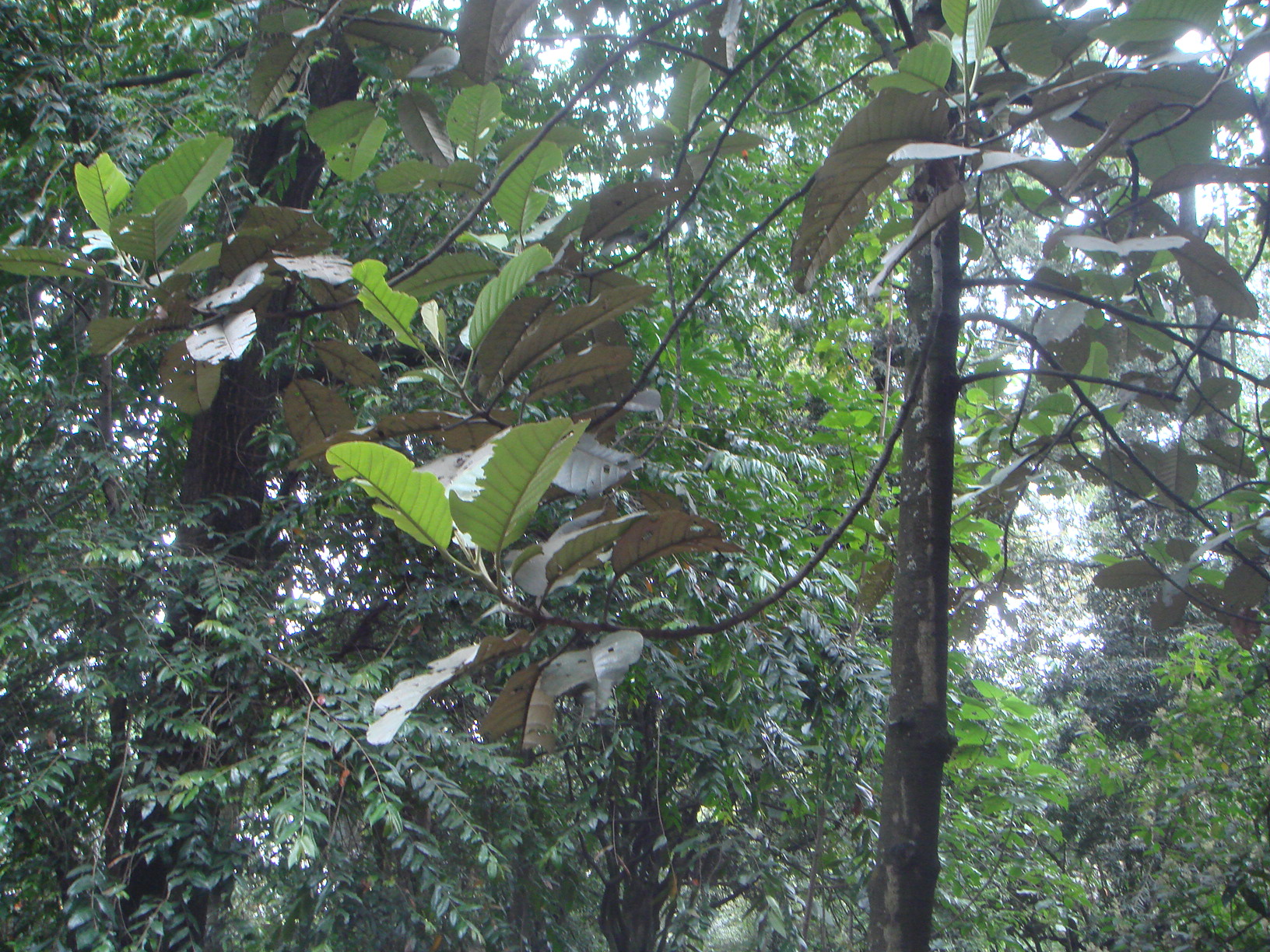
- Hieronyma macrocarpa

Scientific classification
- Kingdom: Plantae
- Clade: Tracheophytes
- Clade: Angiosperms
- Clade: Eudicots
- Clade: Rosids
- Order: Malpighiales
- Family: Phyllanthaceae
- Subfamily: Antidesmatoideae
- Tribe: Antidesmateae
- Subtribe: Hieronyminae
- Genus: Hieronyma; Allemão 1848 not Walp. 1853

Type species
- Hieronyma alchorneoides Allemão

Synonyms
- Hieronima, spelling variant; Hyeronima, spelling variant; Stilaginella Tul.

= Hieronyma =

Genus of flowering plants

Hieronyma is a genus in the plant family Phyllanthaceae. It was first described as a genus in 1848. This family was formerly united with spurges, crotons, copperleaves, etc. (Euphorbiaceae), but have turned out to be well distinct. The genus is native to South America, Central America, southern Mexico, and the West Indies. It is dioecious, with male and female flowers on separate plants.

The spelling Hieronyma has been conserved; the spellings Hieronima and Hyeronima are spelling variants of this name.

Hieronyma is used locally as a foodplant, e.g. by the Nukak of Guaviare Department in the Amazon natural region of Colombia. Several species are threatened by deforestation.

Species

- Hieronyma alchorneoides - S Mexico, C America, S America, W Indies
- Hieronyma antioquensis - Colombia
- Hieronyma asperifolia - Ecuador, Colombia
- Hieronyma clusioides - Cuba, Puerto Rico
- Hieronyma crassistipula - Isla de la Juventud
- Hieronyma cubana - Cuba
- Hieronyma domingensis - Hispaniola
- Hieronyma duquei - Peru, Ecuador, Colombia, Venezuela
- Hieronyma fendleri - S Mexico, C America, NW + W S America
- Hieronyma havanensis - Cuba
- Hieronyma huilensis - - Colombia, NW Venezuela
- Hieronyma jamaicensis - Jamaica
- Hieronyma macrocarpa - from Venezuela to Peru
- Hieronyma montana - Dominican Rep
- Hieronyma nipensis - E Cuba
- Hieronyma oblonga - S Mexico, C America, S America
- Hieronyma ovata - E Cuba
- Hieronyma paucinervis - E Cuba
- Hieronyma reticulata - Bolivia
- Hieronyma rufa - Colombia
- Hieronyma scabrida - Ecuador, Colombia
