= Droogmansia pteropus =

Conservation status
- Least Concern (IUCN 3.1)

Scientific classification
- Kingdom: Plantae
- Clade: Tracheophytes
- Clade: Angiosperms
- Clade: Eudicots
- Clade: Rosids
- Order: Fabales
- Family: Fabaceae
- Subfamily: Faboideae
- Genus: Droogmansia
- Species: D. pteropus

Binomial name
- Droogmansia pteropus (Baker) De Wild.

Synonyms
- Desmodium stuhlmannii Taub.; Dolichos platypus Baker; Dolichos pteropus Baker; Droogmansia friesii Schindl.; Droogmansia hockii De Wild.; Droogmansia longestipitata De Wild.; Droogmansia longipes R.E.Fr.; Droogmansia platypus (Baker) Schindl.; Droogmansia quarrei De Wild.; Droogmansia stuhlmannii (Taub.) De Wild.; Droogmansia whytei Schindl.

Species of plant

Droogmansia pteropus is a plant in the legume family Fabaceae, native to southern tropical Africa.

== Description ==
Droogmansia pteropus grows as a shrub up to 3 metres (10 ft) tall, or rarely as a small tree. The elliptic or oblong leaves measure up to 9 cm (4 in) long and are pubescent underneath. Inflorescences have many flowers with bright red petals. The fruits are yellowish-brown and measure up to 7 cm (3 in) long.

== Distribution and habitat ==
Droogmansia pteropus is native to southern tropical Africa, across a region from the Democratic Republic of the Congo to Mozambique. Its habitat is in wooded grassland or savanna at altitudes of 710–2,250 m (2,300–7,400 ft).
