= Mezilaurus navalium =

Conservation status
- Vulnerable (IUCN 2.3)

Scientific classification
- Kingdom: Plantae
- Clade: Tracheophytes
- Clade: Angiosperms
- Clade: Magnoliids
- Order: Laurales
- Family: Lauraceae
- Genus: Mezilaurus
- Species: M. navalium

Binomial name
- Mezilaurus navalium (Allemão) Taub. ex Mez

Synonyms
- Endiandra navalium (Allemão) Benth.; Mezia navalium (Allemão) Kuntze; Silvaea navalium Meisn.; Silvia navalium Allemão

Species of flowering plant

Mezilaurus navalium is a species of flowering plant in the family Lauraceae. It is a tree endemic to Rio de Janeiro state of southeastern Brazil.
