= Hieronyma clusioides =

Conservation status
- Least Concern (IUCN 3.1)

Scientific classification
- Kingdom: Plantae
- Clade: Tracheophytes
- Clade: Angiosperms
- Clade: Eudicots
- Clade: Rosids
- Order: Malpighiales
- Family: Phyllanthaceae
- Genus: Hieronyma
- Species: H. clusioides

Binomial name
- Hieronyma clusioides (Tul.) Griseb. (1860)

Synonyms
- Antidesma cubanum var. pallidum (Müll.Arg.) M.Gómez (1894); Antidesma rosaurianum M.Gómez (1889); Hieronima clusioides (Tul.) Muell.-Arg. (orth.var.); Hieronyma pallida Müll.Arg. (1866); Hyeronima clusioides (Tul.) Muell.-Arg. (orth.var.); Stilaginella clusioides Tul. (1851)

Species of plant

Hieronyma clusioides is a species of plant in the family Phyllanthaceae, which was recently separated from the Euphorbiaceae. It is native to Puerto Rico and eastern Cuba. It is known as cedro macho in Puerto Rico.
