= Cordyla haraka =

Conservation status
- Least Concern (IUCN 3.1)

Scientific classification
- Kingdom: Plantae
- Clade: Tracheophytes
- Clade: Angiosperms
- Clade: Eudicots
- Clade: Rosids
- Order: Fabales
- Family: Fabaceae
- Subfamily: Faboideae
- Genus: Cordyla
- Species: C. haraka

Binomial name
- Cordyla haraka Capuron

Synonyms
- Dupuya haraka (Capuron) J.H.Kirkbr.

Species of legume

Cordyla haraka, synonym Dupuya haraka, is a species of legume in the family Fabaceae. It is endemic to Madagascar.
