= Cordyla richardii =

Conservation status
- Vulnerable (IUCN 2.3)

Scientific classification
- Kingdom: Plantae
- Clade: Tracheophytes
- Clade: Angiosperms
- Clade: Eudicots
- Clade: Rosids
- Order: Fabales
- Family: Fabaceae
- Subfamily: Faboideae
- Genus: Cordyla
- Species: C. richardii

Binomial name
- Cordyla richardii Milne-Redh.

Species of legume

Cordyla richardii is a species of flowering plant in the family Fabaceae.

It is native to Sudan, South Sudan, and Uganda.
