= Droogmansia montana =

Conservation status
- Endangered (IUCN 3.1)

Scientific classification
- Kingdom: Plantae
- Clade: Tracheophytes
- Clade: Angiosperms
- Clade: Eudicots
- Clade: Rosids
- Order: Fabales
- Family: Fabaceae
- Subfamily: Faboideae
- Genus: Droogmansia
- Species: D. montana

Binomial name
- Droogmansia montana Jacq.-Fél.

Species of plant

Droogmansia montana is a plant in the legume family Fabaceae, native to Guinea.

== Description ==
Droogmansia montana grows as a shrub up to 1.5 metres (5 ft) tall. Inflorescences have flowers with bright yellow and purple petals. The fruits are pod-shaped.

== Distribution and habitat ==
Droogmansia montana is endemic to Guinea. Its habitat is in plateau grasslands at altitudes of 520–1,030 m (1,700–3,400 ft).

== Conservation ==
Droogmansia montana occurs on the Kounounkan Plateau in Guinea. Only four plants were observed in 2017 field work. The main threats are from bush fire, urban expansion and livestock farming. With these threats and the very low species population, Droogmansia montana is assessed as Endangered.
