= Droogmansia =

Scientific classification
- Kingdom: Plantae
- Clade: Tracheophytes
- Clade: Angiosperms
- Clade: Eudicots
- Clade: Rosids
- Order: Fabales
- Family: Fabaceae
- Subfamily: Faboideae
- Clade: Millettioids
- Tribe: Desmodieae
- Genus: Droogmansia; De Wild. (1902)

Genus of legumes

Droogmansia is a genus of flowering plants in the legume family, Fabaceae. It belongs to the subfamily Faboideae. It includes 22 species which are native to tropical Africa, ranging from Guinea to Tanzania, Mozambique, Zimbabwe, and Angola.

== Species ==
As of 2023, Plants of the World Online accepted 22 species:

- Droogmansia angolensis Torre
- Droogmansia chevalieri (Harms) Hutch. & Dalziel
- Droogmansia dorae Torre
- Droogmansia elongata B.G.Schub.
- Droogmansia gossweileri Torre
- Droogmansia grandiflora B.G.Schub.
- Droogmansia lancifolia Schindl.
- Droogmansia ledermannii Schindl.
- Droogmansia longirhachis B.G.Schub.
- Droogmansia megalantha (Taub.) De Wild.
- Droogmansia mildbraedii Schindl.
- Droogmansia montana Jacq.-Fél.
- Droogmansia munamensis De Wild.
- Droogmansia pteropus (Baker) De Wild.
- Droogmansia reducta De Wild.
- Droogmansia scaettaiana A.Chev. & Sillans
- Droogmansia sillansiana A.Chev.
- Droogmansia tenuis B.G.Schub.
- Droogmansia tisserantii Sillans
- Droogmansia vanderystii De Wild.
- Droogmansia vanmeelii B.G.Schub.
- Droogmansia velutina B.G.Schub.
