= Petaladenium =

Conservation status
- Least Concern (IUCN 3.1)

Scientific classification
- Kingdom: Plantae
- Clade: Tracheophytes
- Clade: Angiosperms
- Clade: Eudicots
- Clade: Rosids
- Order: Fabales
- Family: Fabaceae
- Subfamily: Faboideae
- Genus: Petaladenium; Ducke (1938)
- Species: P. urceoliferum

Binomial name
- Petaladenium urceoliferum Ducke (1938)

Genus of plants

Petaladenium urceoliferum is a species of flowering plant in the family Fabaceae. It is a tree native to northern Brazil. It grows in tropical lowland Amazon rainforest in the basin of the Rio Negro, a northern tributary of the Amazon. It is the only member of the genus Petaladenium. The genus belongs to tribe Amburaneae in subfamily Faboideae.

It produces three chemical compounds in its leaves that are not found in other members of the Amburaneae: (2S,4S,5R)-5-hydroxy-4-methoxypipecolic acid, (2S,4R,5S)-5-hydroxy-4-methoxypipecolic acid, and (2S,4R,5R)-4-hydroxy-5-methoxypipecolic acid. Petaladenium urceoliferum is unique among legumes in having fimbriate–glandular wing petals.
