= Orthographical variant =

Mistaken spelling of a scientific name

In biology, within the science of scientific nomenclature, i.e. the naming of organisms, an orthographical variant (abbreviated orth. var.) in botany or an orthographic error in zoology, is a spelling mistake, typing mistake or writing mistake within a scientific publication that resulted in a somewhat different name being accidentally used for an already-named organism. The rules that govern what to do when this happens are laid out in the relevant codes of nomenclature.

== In botanical names ==
In botanical nomenclature, an orthographical variant (abbreviated orth. var.) is a variant spelling of the same name. For example, Hieronima and Hyeronima are orthographical variants of Hieronyma. One of the spellings must be treated as the correct one. In this case, the spelling Hieronyma has been conserved and is to be used as the correct spelling.

An inadvertent use of one of the other spellings has no consequence: the name is to be treated as if it were correctly spelled. Any subsequent use is to be corrected.

Orthographical variants are treated in Art 61 of the ICBN.

== In zoological names ==
In zoology, "orthographical variants" in the formal sense do not exist; a misspelling or orthographic error is treated as a lapsus, a form of inadvertent error. The first reviser is allowed to choose one variant for mandatory further use, but in other ways, these errors generally have no further formal standing. Inadvertent misspellings are treated in Art. 32-33 of the ICZN.
