= Droogmansia chevalieri =

Conservation status
- Endangered (IUCN 3.1)

Scientific classification
- Kingdom: Plantae
- Clade: Tracheophytes
- Clade: Angiosperms
- Clade: Eudicots
- Clade: Rosids
- Order: Fabales
- Family: Fabaceae
- Subfamily: Faboideae
- Genus: Droogmansia
- Species: D. chevalieri

Binomial name
- Droogmansia chevalieri (Harms) Hutch. & Dalziel

Synonyms
- Dolichos chevalieri Harms

Species of plant

Droogmansia chevalieri is a plant in the legume family Fabaceae, native to West Africa.

== Description ==
Droogmansia chevalieri grows as a woody herb. The leaves grow singly. The inflorescences are in the upper leaves and feature racemes of small flowers. The fruits are pod-shaped.

== Distribution and habitat ==
Droogmansia chevalieri is native to Guinea, Sierra Leone and Ivory Coast. Its habitat is in grasslands at altitudes of 600–1,600 m (2,000–5,200 ft).

== Conservation ==
Droogmansia chevalieri is threatened by mining, railway construction, fires and agriculture. With these threats and the likely low species population, Droogmansia chevalieri is assessed as Endangered.
