= Droogmansia scaettaiana =

Conservation status
- Near Threatened (IUCN 3.1)

Scientific classification
- Kingdom: Plantae
- Clade: Tracheophytes
- Clade: Angiosperms
- Clade: Eudicots
- Clade: Rosids
- Order: Fabales
- Family: Fabaceae
- Subfamily: Faboideae
- Genus: Droogmansia
- Species: D. scaettaiana

Binomial name
- Droogmansia scaettaiana A.Chev. & Sillans

Species of plant

Droogmansia scaettaiana is a plant in the legume family Fabaceae, native to West Africa.

== Description ==
Droogmansia scaettaiana grows as a perennial shrub up to 2 metres (7 ft) tall. The species is likely a pyrophyte (one adapted to recover from fire).

== Distribution and habitat ==
Droogmansia scaettaiana is native to the region from Guinea to Ivory Coast. Its habitat is in grassland or savanna at altitudes of 330–1,700 m (1,100–5,600 ft).

== Conservation ==
Droogmansia scaettaiana is threatened by mining activity at sites in Guinea and Liberia. Urbanization and agriculture pose a threat in other areas.
