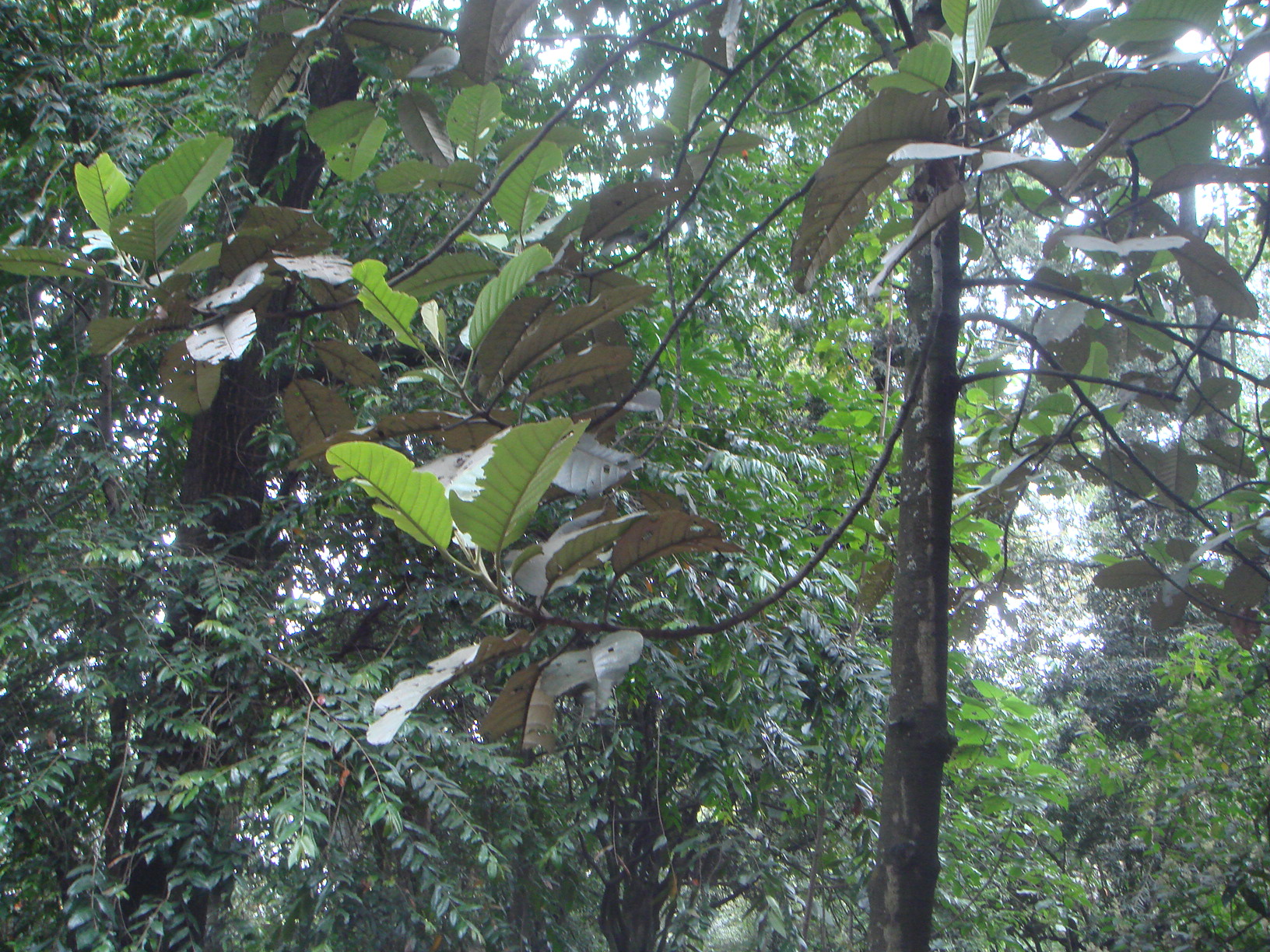

Conservation status
- Vulnerable (IUCN 2.3)

Scientific classification
- Kingdom: Plantae
- Clade: Tracheophytes
- Clade: Angiosperms
- Clade: Eudicots
- Clade: Rosids
- Order: Malpighiales
- Family: Phyllanthaceae
- Genus: Hieronyma
- Species: H. macrocarpa

Binomial name
- Hieronyma macrocarpa Schltr.

Synonyms
- Hieronima macrocarpa Schltr. (orth.var.); Hyeronima macrocarpa Schltr. (orth.var.)

= Hieronyma macrocarpa =

Species of flowering plant

Hieronyma macrocarpa is a species of plant in the family Phyllanthaceae, which was recently separated from the Euphorbiaceae. It is found in Colombia and Ecuador.
