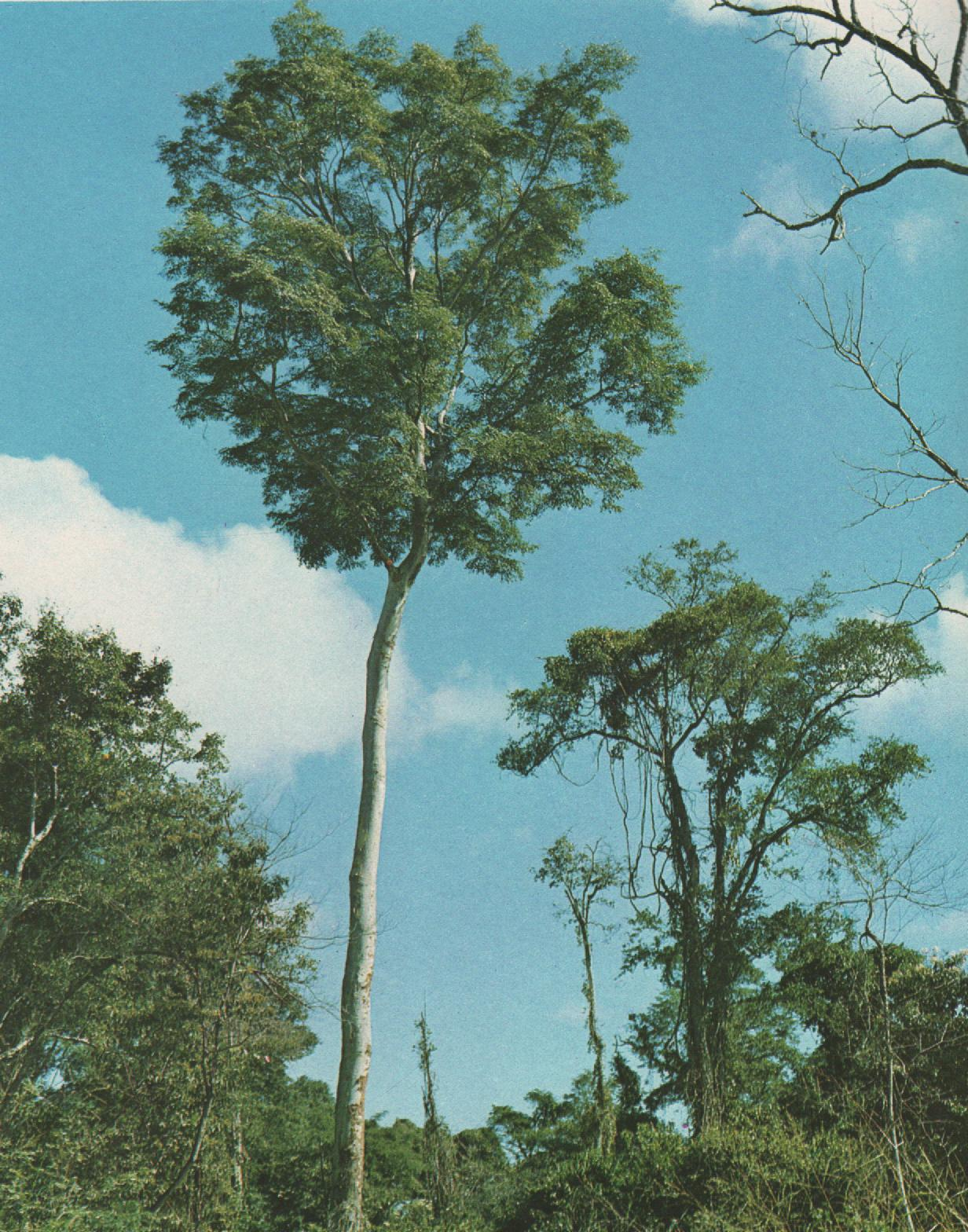

Conservation status
- Endangered (IUCN 3.1)

Scientific classification
- Kingdom: Plantae
- Clade: Tracheophytes
- Clade: Angiosperms
- Clade: Eudicots
- Clade: Rosids
- Order: Fabales
- Family: Fabaceae
- Subfamily: Faboideae
- Genus: Amburana
- Species: A. cearensis

Binomial name
- Amburana cearensis (Allemão) A.C.Sm.

Synonyms
- Amburana claudii Schwacke & Taub.; Torresea cearensis Allemão (basionym)

= Amburana cearensis =

Species of legume

Amburana cearensis is a species of timber tree in the family Fabaceae. This plant is native to northern, eastern, and west-central Brazil, northwestern Argentina, Bolivia, and Paraguay. It is threatened by habitat loss.

Portuguese common names include ambaúrana, amburana, amburana de cheiro, angelim, baru, cabocla, cerejeira rajada, cumaré, cumaru, cumaru de cheiro, cumaru do ceará, cumbaru das caatingas, emburana, emburana de cheiro, imburana, imburana brava, imburana cheirosa, imburana de cheiro, louro ingá, umburana, umburana lisa, umburana macho, umburana vermelha, umburana de cheiro, umburana-de-cheiro, and umburana do cheiro.

Spanish common names include ishpingo and roble criollo.
