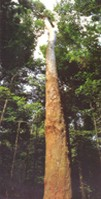

Conservation status
- Vulnerable (IUCN 2.3)

Scientific classification
- Kingdom: Plantae
- Clade: Tracheophytes
- Clade: Angiosperms
- Clade: Magnoliids
- Order: Laurales
- Family: Lauraceae
- Genus: Mezilaurus
- Species: M. itauba

Binomial name
- Mezilaurus itauba (Meissner) Taubert ex Mez

= Mezilaurus itauba =

Species of tree

Mezilaurus itauba is a species of tree in the family Lauraceae. It is found in Bolivia, Brazil, Ecuador, French Guiana, Peru, and Suriname.
