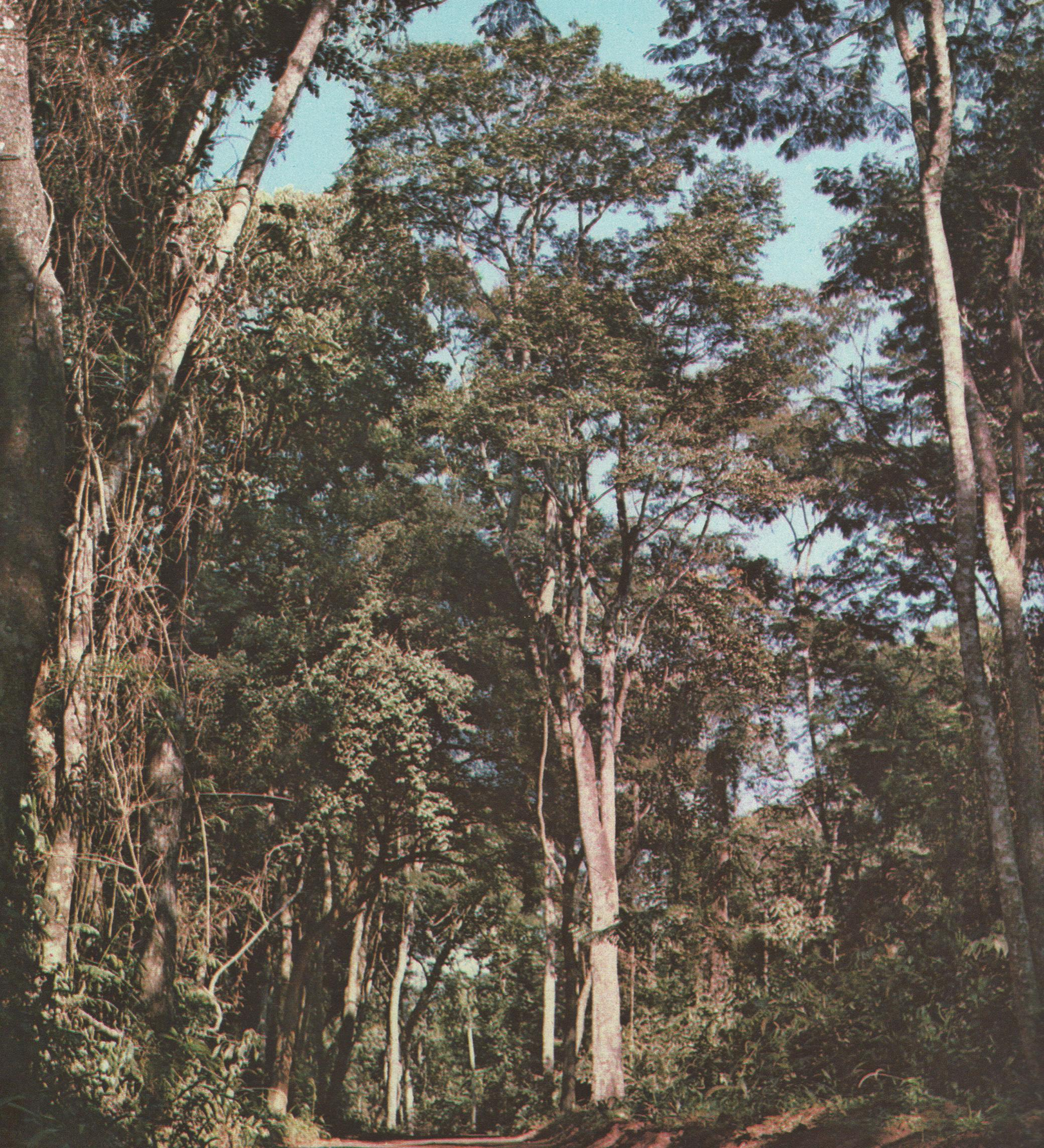
- Myrocarpus frondosus

Scientific classification
- Kingdom: Plantae
- Clade: Embryophytes
- Clade: Tracheophytes
- Clade: Angiosperms
- Clade: Eudicots
- Clade: Rosids
- Order: Fabales
- Family: Fabaceae
- Subfamily: Faboideae
- Tribe: Amburaneae
- Genus: Myrocarpus; Allemão (1847)

Species
- five; see text

= Myrocarpus =

Genus of legumes

Myrocarpus is a genus of flowering plants in the family Fabaceae. It includes five species of trees native to tropical South America, ranging from Venezuela to northern Argentina. Typical habitats include wet to seasonally-dry tropical lowland forest and woodland.

It contains the following species:

- Myrocarpus emarginatus A.L.B.Sartori & A.M.G.Azevedo
- Myrocarpus fastigiatus Allemão
- Myrocarpus frondosus Allemão
- Myrocarpus leprosus Pickel
- Myrocarpus venezuelensis Rudd

Members of this genus produce hydroxypipecolic acids in their leaves.
