= Paul Hermann Wilhelm Taubert =

German botanist (1862–1897)

Paul Hermann Wilhelm Taubert (12 August 1862 – 1 January 1897) was a German botanist.

Taubert was born in Berlin, where he studied botany as a pupil of Ignatz Urban. While a student, he collected plants in Cyrenaica (1887). From 1889 to 1895 he was associated with the Botanical Museum in Berlin, working as a scientific assistant in 1893–95. Afterwards, he embarked on a botanical expedition to Brazil, where he conducted botanical investigations in the states of Pernambuco, Ceará, Piauí, Maranhão and Amazonas. He died in Manáos on 1 January 1897 (age 34).

He was the taxonomic authority of many plant species. In 1893 Karl Moritz Schumann named the plant genus Taubertia (family Menispermaceae) in his honor.

== Selected works ==
- Monographie der gattung Stylosanthes. Verh. Bot. Ver. Prov. Brandenb. v. 32, p. 1-34. (1890) – Monograph on the genus Stylosanthes.
- Leguminosae in: Natürliche Pflanzenfamilien. Vol. III, 3. (1891).
- Leguminosae novae v. minus cognitae austro-americanae II ... Flora, v. 75, p. 68-86. (1892).
- Plantae Glaziovianae novae vel minus cognitae IV ... Engler's Bot. Jahrb. v. 17, p. 502-526. (1893).
- Beitrage zur kenntnis der flora des central- brasilianischen staates Goyaz ... Engler's Bot. Jahrb. v. 21, p. 401-457, pi. 2–3. (1895–96, with Ernst Heinrich Georg Ule) – Contributions to the knowledge of flora of the central Brazilian state of Goiás.
