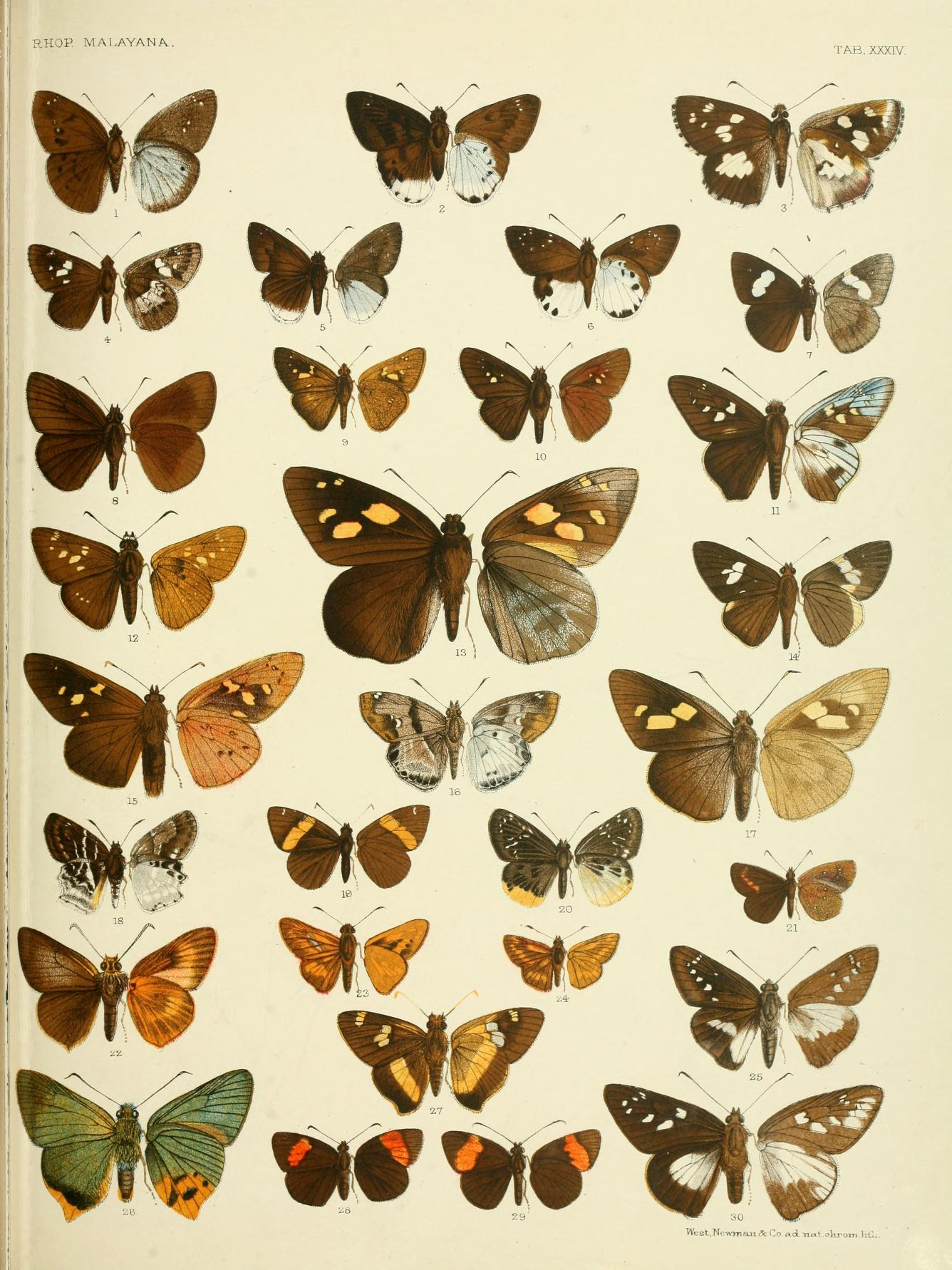
- In William Lucas Distant's Rhopalocera Malayana (figure 25)

Scientific classification
- Kingdom: Animalia
- Phylum: Arthropoda
- Clade: Pancrustacea
- Class: Insecta
- Order: Lepidoptera
- Family: Hesperiidae
- Subfamily: Hesperiinae
- Genus: Eetion de Nicéville, 1895
- Species: E. elia

Binomial name
- Eetion elia (Hewitson, [1866])

Synonyms
- Hesperia elia Hewitson, [1866]; Eetion elia magniplaga Fruhstorfer, 1911; Eetion elia ayankara Fruhstorfer, 1911

= Eetion elia =

Species of butterfly

Eetion elia, the white-spot palmer, is a butterfly of the family Hesperiidae. It was described by William Chapman Hewitson in 1866. It is found in Malaysia and Singapore, as well as on Sumatra and Borneo. The habitat consists of fringes of secondary forests. It is the only species in the monotypic genus Eetion, erected by Lionel de Nicéville in 1895.

The wingspan is about 38 mm.This genus is established for a species separated from all its allies by a row of transparent spots in the hindwing (right across the centre of the hindwing). The white median band of the hindwing is narrow. The white of the anal-marginal portion of the hindwing above is immediately adjoining to the transverse row of hyaline spots.

The larvae probably feed on Cleistanthus sumatranus.
