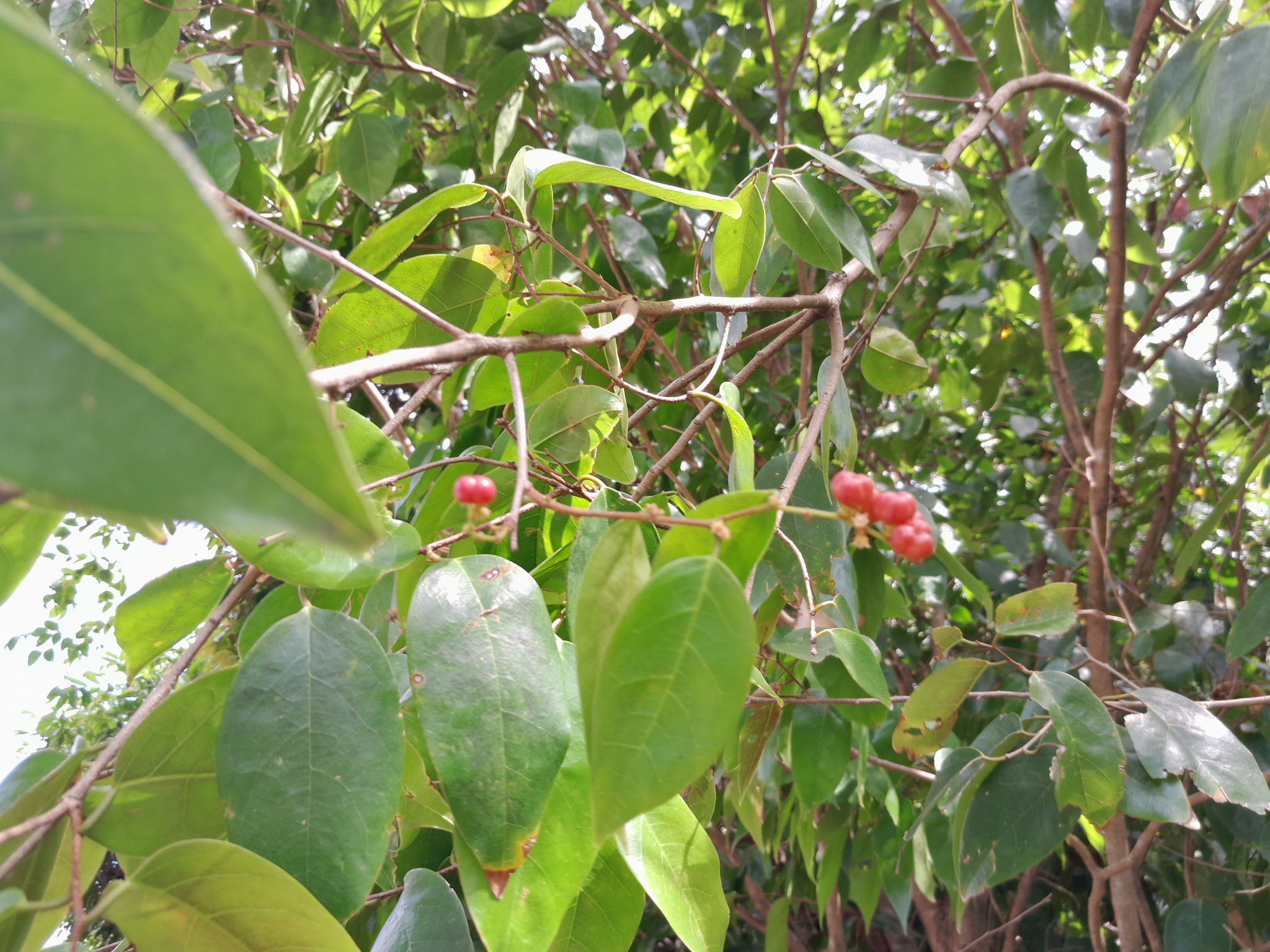

Conservation status
- Least Concern (IUCN 3.1)
- Least Concern (NCA)

Scientific classification
- Kingdom: Plantae
- Clade: Embryophytes
- Clade: Tracheophytes
- Clade: Spermatophytes
- Clade: Angiosperms
- Clade: Eudicots
- Clade: Rosids
- Order: Malpighiales
- Family: Phyllanthaceae
- Genus: Cleistanthus
- Species: C. hylandii

Binomial name
- Cleistanthus hylandii Airy Shaw

= Cleistanthus hylandii =

Bernie's Cleistanthus

Species of flowering plant

Cleistanthus hylandii, commonly known as Bernie's Cleistanthus, is an evergreen plant in the family Phyllanthaceae which is endemic to Cape York Peninsula in far northern Queensland, Australia.

== Description ==
Cleistanthus hylandii is a shrub or small tree up to 8 m (26 ft) high. The leaves are simple and alternate, and held on petioles from 2 to 15 mm (0.1 to 0.6 in) long. Leaves are mostly glabrous (without hairs) and are ovate to elliptic. New growth is pink or reddish.

The inflorescences are produced either terminally or in the leaf axils, the flowers very small at about 2 mm (0.1 in) diameter. The fruit is a brown to green capsule about 7 mm (0.3 in) diameter.

== Taxonomy ==
This species was first described in 1976 by the English botanist Airy Shaw, based on material collected by the Australian botanist Bernard Hyland near the Claudie River in Cape York Peninsula. His paper, titled New or Noteworthy Australian Euphorbiaceae was published in the Kew Bulletin.

=== Etymology ===
The genus name Cleistanthus is derived from the Ancient Greek words kleistós (closed), and ánthos (flower), and refers to the petals being enclosed by the sepals in some species. The species epithet hylandii was chosen by Shaw to honour Hyland.

== Conservation ==
This species is listed by both IUCN and the Queensland Department of Environment and Science as least concern.

== Gallery ==
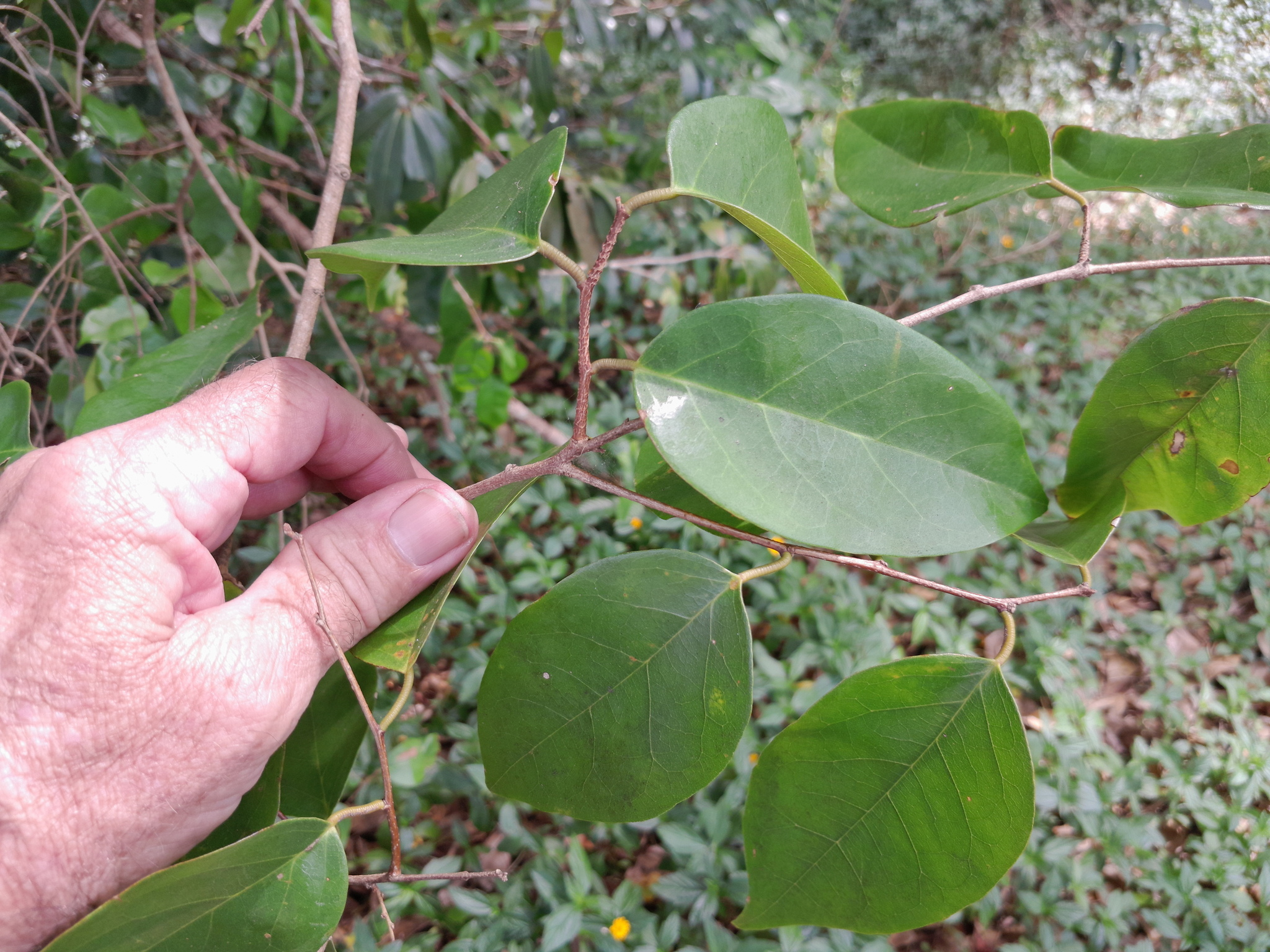

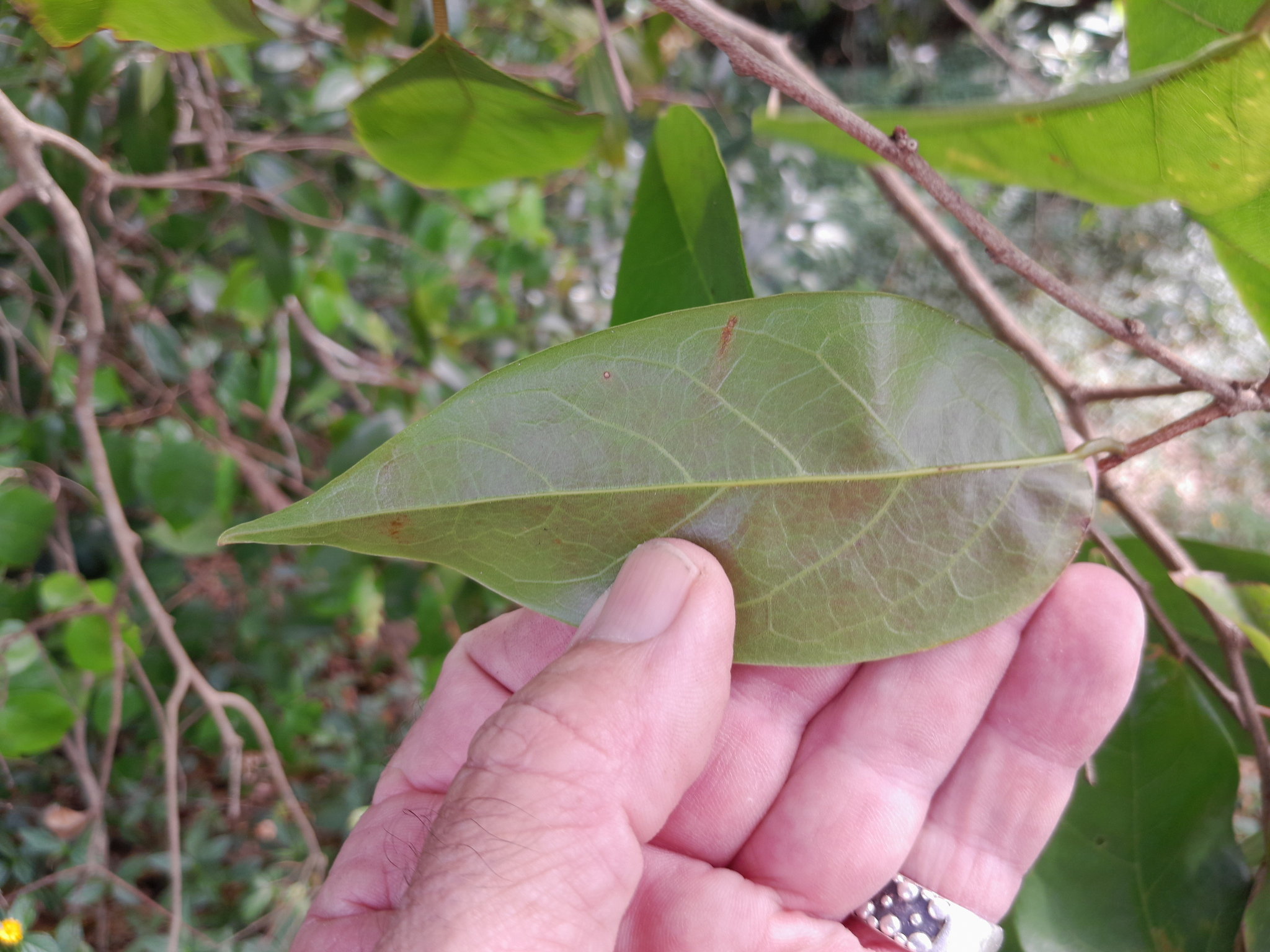
