= Cleistanthus sankunnianus =

Scientific classification
- Kingdom: Plantae
- Clade: Tracheophytes
- Clade: Angiosperms
- Clade: Eudicots
- Clade: Rosids
- Order: Malpighiales
- Family: Phyllanthaceae
- Genus: Cleistanthus
- Species: C. sankunnianus

Binomial name
- Cleistanthus sankunnianus Sivar. & Balach.

Species of flowering plant

Cleistanthus sankunnianus is a plant species described by V.V. Sivarajan & Indu Balachandran 1984; it is included in the family Phyllanthaceae. No subspecies are listed in the Catalogue of Life.

This species found in the herbal garden at Kottakkal Aryavaidyasala (Kerala, India). The glabrous ovary brings the species under Sects. Australis (Jablonszky) and Nanopetalum (Hassk.). The persistent calyx, sessile male flowers and non-striated capsules are similar to C. stipitatus, but differs from C. stipitatus with its glabrous ovary. The species differs from C. travencorensis in several details. The species name is after P. Sankunni Varier, the founder of Arya Vaidya Sala, Kottakkal.
