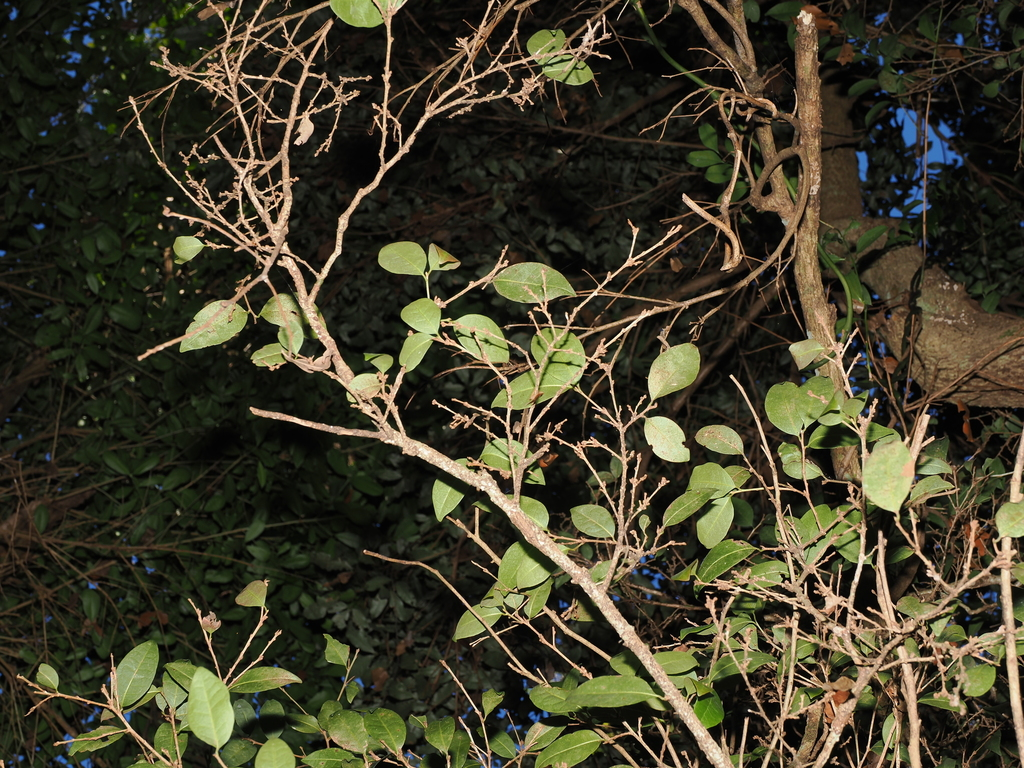

Scientific classification
- Kingdom: Plantae
- Clade: Embryophytes
- Clade: Tracheophytes
- Clade: Spermatophytes
- Clade: Angiosperms
- Clade: Eudicots
- Clade: Rosids
- Order: Malpighiales
- Family: Phyllanthaceae
- Genus: Cleistanthus
- Species: C. cunninghamii

Binomial name
- Cleistanthus cunninghamii (Müll.Arg.) Müll.Arg.

Synonyms
- Lebidiera cunninghamii

= Cleistanthus cunninghamii =

Species of plant

Cleistanthus cunninghamii, the omega, is a species of large shrub to small tree. It grows up to 9 metres tall in littoral or dry rainforest, and is found in eastern Australia in the states of New South Wales and Queensland.
