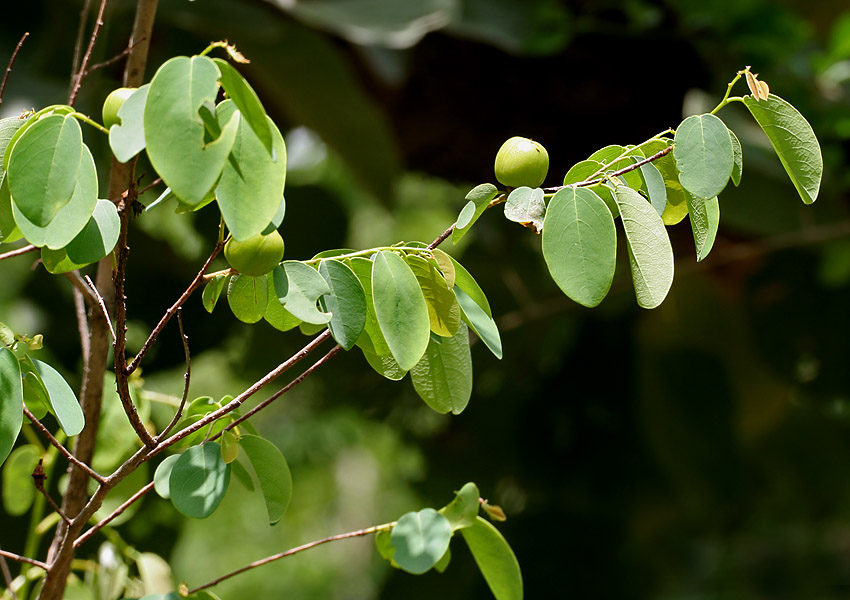

Conservation status
- Vulnerable (IUCN 2.3)

Scientific classification
- Kingdom: Plantae
- Clade: Tracheophytes
- Clade: Angiosperms
- Clade: Eudicots
- Clade: Rosids
- Order: Malpighiales
- Family: Phyllanthaceae
- Genus: Cleistanthus
- Species: C. collinus

Binomial name
- Cleistanthus collinus (Roxb.) Benth. ex Hook.f.

Synonyms
- Lebidieropsis orbiculata var. lambertii Lebidieropsis orbiculata var. collina Lebidieropsis orbiculata (Roth) Müll.Arg. Lebidieropsis collina (Roxb.) Müll.Arg. Emblica palasis Buch.-Ham. Bridelia collina (Roxb.) Hook. & Arn. Andrachne orbiculata Roth; Andrachne cadishaco Roxb. ex Wall. Amanoa collina (Roxb.) Baill.

= Cleistanthus collinus =

Species of plant

Cleistanthus collinus is a plant species first described by Roxburgh, with its current name after Bentham and Hooker; it is included in the family Phyllanthaceae. The IUCN categorizes this species as vulnerable. No subspecies are listed in the Catalogue of Life.

== Properties ==
Cleistanthus collinus (Karra) contains a plant poison also called oduvan (Tamil), kadise (Kannada), Vadisaku (Telugu), Oduku (Malayalam) and Gaja Madara (Sinhala) . Ingestion of its leaves or a decoction of its leaves causes hypokalemia (kaliuresis and cardiac arrhythmias), metabolic acidosis, hypotension and hypoxia probably due to distal renal tubular acidosis, ARDS and toxin induced vasodilatation respectively. Hypokalemia and acidosis probably also induces rhabdomyolysis resulting in myoglobinuric kidney failure and neuromuscular weakness. Its effects are probably mediated by injury to the distal renal tubules, pulmonary epithelium and peripheral blood vessels due to glutathione depletion (animal studies have shown benefit with N-acetylcysteine).

== Gallery ==
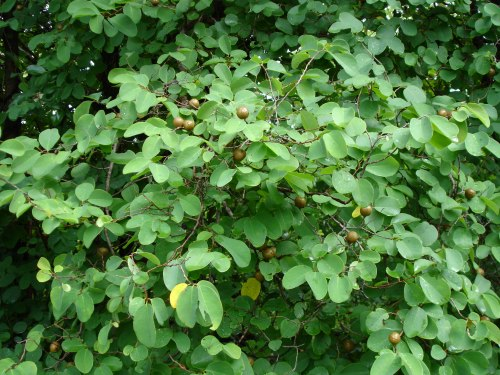
Karra at fruiting

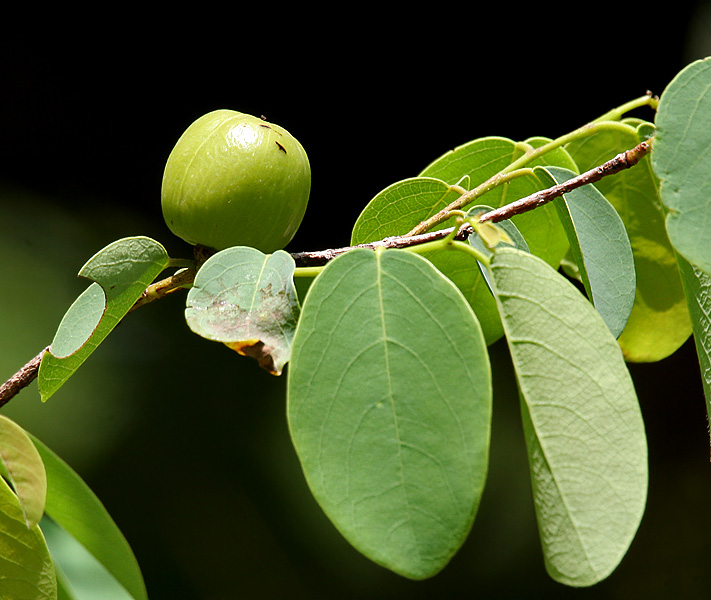

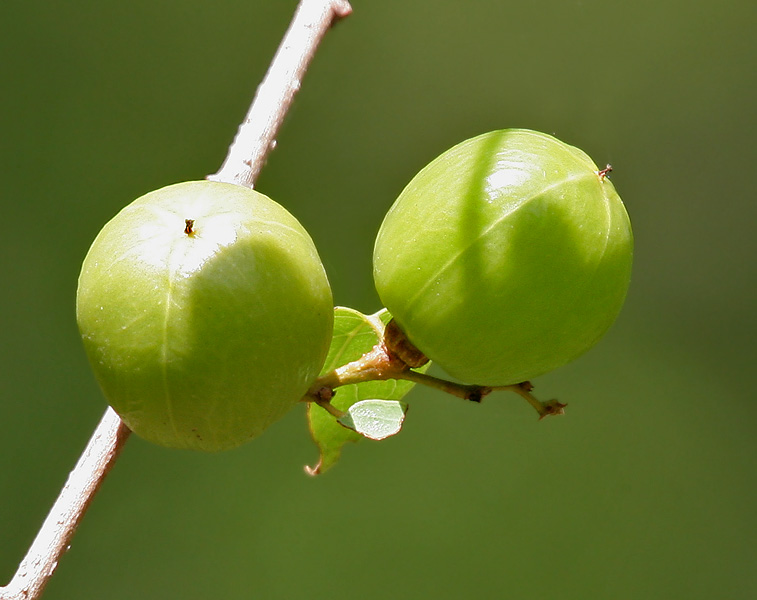

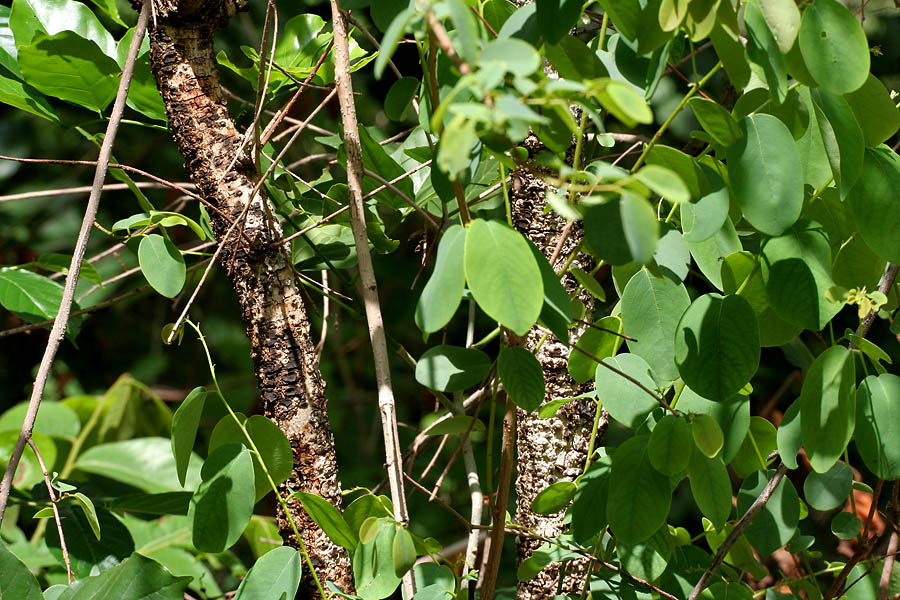
