= Cleistanthus schlechteri =

Scientific classification
- Kingdom: Plantae
- Clade: Tracheophytes
- Clade: Angiosperms
- Clade: Eudicots
- Clade: Rosids
- Order: Malpighiales
- Family: Phyllanthaceae
- Genus: Cleistanthus
- Species: C. schlechteri

Binomial name
- Cleistanthus schlechteri (Pax) Hutch.

Synonyms
- Securinega schlechteri Pax

Species of tree

Cleistanthus schlechteri is a plant species first described by Pax, with its current name after Hutchinson; it is included in the family Phyllanthaceae.

== Subspecies and status ==
The following subspecies are listed in the Catalogue of Life:

- C. s. pubescens
- C. s. schlechteri

Cleistanthus schlechteri var. schlechteri (False Tamboti, Zulu: Umzithi) is a protected tree in South Africa.

== Description ==
=== General ===
Small tree (up to 6 m), deciduous, multi or single stemmed, fairly upright and minimally spreading crown. Many twigs and branches, trunks pale buff-grey, bark cracks into small, flat, more or less rectangular blocks.

=== Leaves ===
Simple, borne on very short, gnarled, lateral twigs. Very small, oval to obovate, smooth, glabrous, marginally entire, dark green and glossy above.

=== Flowers ===
Both the sexes are borne on separate trees in small bunches, yellow-green to pale green; (October/November).

=== Fruits ===
Capsules 10 x 8 mm, glabrous and glossy; brown to dark-brown when ripe (January/February).
