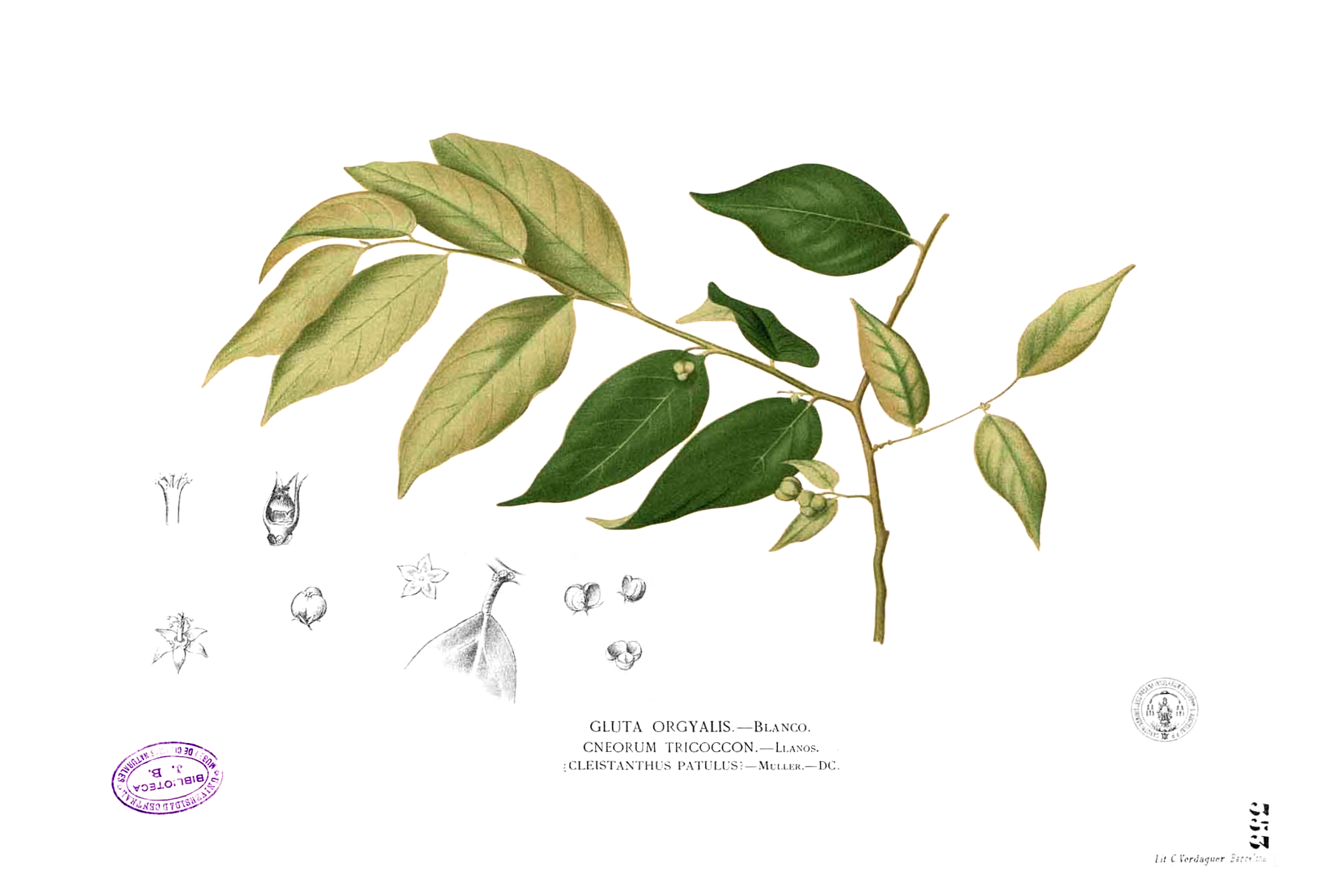
- Cleistanthus orgyialis

Scientific classification
- Kingdom: Plantae
- Clade: Tracheophytes
- Clade: Angiosperms
- Clade: Eudicots
- Clade: Rosids
- Order: Malpighiales
- Family: Phyllanthaceae
- Subfamily: Phyllanthoideae
- Tribe: Bridelieae
- Subtribe: Pseudolachnostylidinae
- Genus: Cleistanthus; Hook.f. ex Planch.

Synonyms
- Clistanthus Post & Kuntze, spelling variation; Godefroya Gagnep.; Kaluhaburunghos Kuntze; Lebidiera Baill.; Lebidieropsis Müll.Arg.; Leiopyxis Miq.; Nanopetalum Hassk.; Paracleisthus Gagnep.; Schistostigma Lauterb.; Stenonia Baill.; Stenoniella Kuntze

= Cleistanthus =

Genus of flowering plants

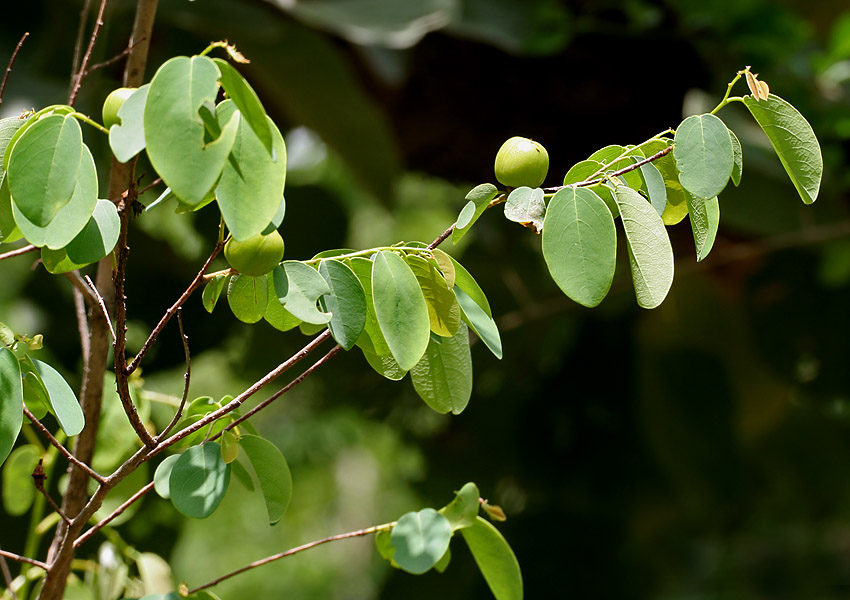
Cleistanthus collinus in Narsapur, Medak district, India.

Cleistanthus is a plant genus of the family Phyllanthaceae, tribe Bridelieae, first described as a genus in 1848. It is widespread in much of the Old World Tropics in Asia, Africa, Australia, and various oceanic islands. Cleistanthus collinus is known for being toxic and may be the agent of homicides or suicides.

Species

1. Cleistanthus acuminatus – Sri Lanka
2. Cleistanthus andamanicus – Andaman Islands
3. Cleistanthus angustifolius – Luzon
4. Cleistanthus annamensis – Vietnam
5. Cleistanthus apodus – Queensland, eastern New Guinea
6. Cleistanthus bakonensis – Borneo
7. Cleistanthus balakrishnanii – Nicobar Islands
8. Cleistanthus bambidianus – Gabon
9. Cleistanthus baramicus – Borneo
10. Cleistanthus beccarianus – Sarawak
11. Cleistanthus bipindensis – Central Africa
12. Cleistanthus boivinianus – Madagascar
13. Cleistanthus bracteosus – Peninsular Malaysia
14. Cleistanthus bracteosus – Indonesia, Philippines
15. Cleistanthus capuronii – eastern Madagascar
16. Cleistanthus carolinianus – Palau
17. Cleistanthus caudatus – Central Africa
18. Cleistanthus celebicus – Sabah, Sulawesi
19. Cleistanthus chlorocarpus – Sarawak
20. Cleistanthus collinus – Indian Subcontinent
21. Cleistanthus concinnus – Hainan, Vietnam
22. Cleistanthus contractus – Peninsular Malaysia, Sabah
23. Cleistanthus coriaceus – Sarawak
24. Cleistanthus cunninghamii – Queensland, New South Wales
25. Cleistanthus curtisii – Peninsular Malaysia
26. Cleistanthus dallachyanus – Queensland, Northern Territory
27. Cleistanthus decurrens – Thailand, Philippines, Borneo, Peninsular Malaysia
28. Cleistanthus denudatus – Thailand
29. Cleistanthus discolor – Queensland
30. †Cleistanthus diversifolius – ?
31. Cleistanthus dolichophyllus – Peninsular Malaysia
32. Cleistanthus duvipermaniorum – Democratic Republic of the Congo, Angola
33. Cleistanthus eberhardtii – Vietnam
34. Cleistanthus ellipticus – Peninsular Malaysia
35. Cleistanthus elongatus – Sarawak
36. Cleistanthus erycibifolius – Peninsular Malaysia, Borneo, Negros
37. Cleistanthus everettii – Borneo, Philippines
38. Cleistanthus evrardii – Democratic Republic of the Congo, Republic of the Congo
39. Cleistanthus ferrugineus – Sri Lanka
40. Cleistanthus flavescens – Peninsular Malaysia
41. Cleistanthus floricola – Flores
42. Cleistanthus gabonensis – Gabon
43. Cleistanthus glaber – Borneo, Peninsular Malaysia, Mindanao
44. Cleistanthus glabratus – Sarawak
45. Cleistanthus glandulosus – Peninsular Malaysia, southern Thailand, Sumatra
46. Cleistanthus gracilis – Peninsular Malaysia, southern Thailand, Sumatra, Borneo
47. Cleistanthus helferi – Peninsular Malaysia, Thailand, Myanmar
48. Cleistanthus hirsutopetalus – Peninsular Malaysia, Thailand, Singapore
49. Cleistanthus hirsutulus – Peninsular Malaysia, Thailand, Sumatra, Borneo, Vietnam
50. Cleistanthus hylandii – Queensland
51. Cleistanthus indochinensis – Vietnam
52. Cleistanthus inglorius – Papua New Guinea
53. Cleistanthus insignis – Morobe
54. Cleistanthus insularis – Palau
55. Cleistanthus inundatus – Democratic Republic of the Congo, Republic of the Congo, Angola
56. Cleistanthus isabellinus – Sabah, Philippines, New Guinea
57. Cleistanthus itsoghensis – Central Africa
58. Cleistanthus jacobsianus – Sarawak
59. Cleistanthus kingii – Peninsular Malaysia
60. Cleistanthus kwangensis – Democratic Republic of the Congo, Angola
61. Cleistanthus langkawiensis – Langkawi
62. Cleistanthus lanuginosus – Peninsular Malaysia
63. Cleistanthus letouzeyi – Cameroon, Gabon, Equatorial Guinea
64. Cleistanthus libericus – Western and Central Africa
65. Cleistanthus longinervis – Peninsular Malaysia
66. Cleistanthus macrophyllus – Peninsular Malaysia, southern Thailand, Borneo, Yunnan
67. Cleistanthus maingayi – Peninsular Malaysia, Sarawak
68. Cleistanthus major – Peninsular Malaysia
69. Cleistanthus malabaricus – southwestern India
70. Cleistanthus malaccensis – Peninsular Malaysia
71. Cleistanthus meeboldii – Myanmar
72. Cleistanthus megacarpus – Philippines, Indonesia
73. Cleistanthus membranaceus – Peninsular Malaysia
74. Cleistanthus micranthus – Fiji
75. Cleistanthus monoicus – Guangdong
76. Cleistanthus morii – Chuuk
77. Cleistanthus namatanaiensis – Bismarck Archipelago
78. Cleistanthus ngounyensis – Gabon
79. Cleistanthus nitidus – Peninsular Malaysia
80. Cleistanthus normanbyanus – D'Entrecasteaux Islands
81. Cleistanthus oblongatus – Sarawak
82. Cleistanthus oblongifolius – Bangladesh, Southeast Asia, Papuasia, Queensland
83. Cleistanthus occidentalis – western Madagascar
84. Cleistanthus pallidus – Sri Lanka
85. Cleistanthus papuanus – Papua New Guinea
86. Cleistanthus papyraceus – Myanmar, Thailand
87. Cleistanthus parvifolius – Peninsular Malaysia
88. Cleistanthus patulus – India, Sri Lanka
89. Cleistanthus paxii – Sarawak
90. Cleistanthus pedicellatus – Guangxi, Peninsular Malaysia, Borneo, Philippines, New Guinea
91. Cleistanthus peninsularis – Papua New Guinea, Queensland
92. Cleistanthus perrieri – eastern Madagascar
93. Cleistanthus petelotii – Guangxi, Vietnam
94. Cleistanthus pierlotii – Democratic Republic of the Congo, Gabon
95. Cleistanthus pierrei – Vietnam
96. Cleistanthus pilosus – Basilan, Mindanao
97. Cleistanthus podocarpus – Peninsular Malaysia
98. Cleistanthus podopyxis – Borneo
99. Cleistanthus polyneurus – Peninsular Malaysia
100. Cleistanthus polyphyllus – Peninsular Malaysia, southern Thailand
101. Cleistanthus polystachyus – tropical Africa
102. Cleistanthus praetermissus – Peninsular Malaysia, southern Thailand, Borneo
103. Cleistanthus pseudopallidus – Sumatra
104. Cleistanthus pseudopodocarpus – Peninsular Malaysia, Sumatra, Borneo
105. Cleistanthus pubens – Borneo
106. Cleistanthus pyrrhocarpus – Borneo
107. Cleistanthus ripicola – tropical Africa
108. Cleistanthus robinsonii – Palawan, Sibuyan
109. Cleistanthus robustus – Sri Lanka, Andaman Islands
110. Cleistanthus rotundatus – Cambodia
111. Cleistanthus rufescens – Peninsular Malaysia, Sumatra, Borneo, Philippines
112. Cleistanthus rufus – Peninsular Malaysia, southern Thailand
113. Cleistanthus salicifolius – Sarawak
114. Cleistanthus sankunnianus – southwestern India
115. Cleistanthus sarawakensis – Sarawak
116. Cleistanthus schlechteri – from Kenya to KwaZulu-Natal
117. Cleistanthus semiopacus – Queensland
118. Cleistanthus stenonia – Mayotte, Madagascar
119. Cleistanthus stenophyllus – Myanmar
120. Cleistanthus stipitatus – New Caledonia
121. Cleistanthus stipularis – western India
122. Cleistanthus striatus – Borneo
123. Cleistanthus suarezensis – Madagascar
124. Cleistanthus sumatranus – southern China, Southeast Asia, New Guinea
125. Cleistanthus tenerifolius – Sumatra, Kalimantan
126. Cleistanthus tomentosus – southern China, Southeast Asia
127. Cleistanthus tonkinensis – southern China, Vietnam
128. Cleistanthus travancorensis – southwestern India
129. Cleistanthus venosus – Peninsular Malaysia, Sumatra, Borneo, Mindanao
130. Cleistanthus vestitus – Peninsular Malaysia, Sumatra, Borneo, Luzon
131. Cleistanthus winkleri – Borneo
132. Cleistanthus xanthopus – Papua New Guinea
133. Cleistanthus xerophilus – Queensland
134. Cleistanthus zenkeri – tropical Africa
