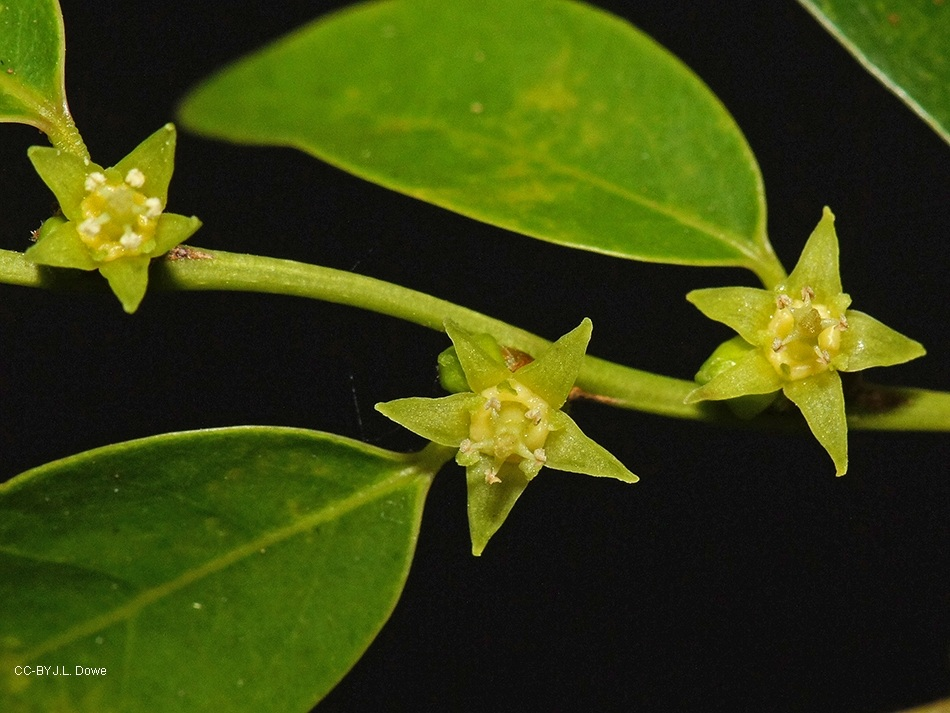
- Flowers

Conservation status
- Least Concern (NCA)
- Least Concern (IUCN 3.1)

Scientific classification
- Kingdom: Plantae
- Clade: Tracheophytes
- Clade: Angiosperms
- Clade: Eudicots
- Clade: Rosids
- Order: Malpighiales
- Family: Phyllanthaceae
- Genus: Cleistanthus
- Species: C. apodus

Binomial name
- Cleistanthus apodus Benth.

Synonyms
- Kaluhaburunghos apodus (Benth.) Kuntze

= Cleistanthus apodus =

Weeping Cleistanthus

Species of flowering plant

Cleistanthus apodus, commonly known as the weeping Cleistanthus, is a tree in the family Phyllanthaceae native to New Guinea and northeast Queensland. It was first described in 1873 by the English botanist George Bentham in his seven-volume book Flora Australiensis.

== Description ==
Cleistanthus apodus is a shrub or small tree growing up to about 12 m (39 ft) tall with a trunk usually less than 20 cm (7.9 in) diameter. The thin leaves are simple and arranged alternately on the twigs, on petioles (stems) about 9 mm (0.35 in) long. Stipules are minute, less than 1 mm (0.039 in) long, and the leaves are dark green and somewhat glossy above, slightly lighter green and dull below. They are ovate to lanceolate in shape, and measure up to 20 cm (7.9 in) long by 8 cm (3.1 in) wide.

The inflorescence is a spike or fascicle produced in the leaf axils carrying very small 5-petaled flowers about 2 mm (0.079 in) diameter.

The fruit is a green to brown stemless capsule up to 10 mm (0.39 in) long and 12 mm (0.47 in) diameter. It has 3 segments and contains about 6 seeds.

=== Phenology ===
This species has been observed flowering between August and October, and fruiting from September to February.

== Taxonomy ==
This species was first described by the English botanist George Bentham in volume VI of his work Flora Australiensis. The description was based on material collected at Rockingham Bay and Cape York Peninsula by John Dallachy and others. In 1891 the German botanist Otto Kuntze published a description of this species with a new combination, i.e. Kaluhaburunghos apodus (Benth.) Kuntze, however his name was not accepted and the original combination given by Bentham remains in place.

=== Taxonomic history ===
At the time of Bentham's publication describing this species, Cleistanthus was included in the family Euphorbiaceae, subfamily Phyllanthoideae. However in the release of the APG II system in 2003, Phyllanthoideae was removed from Euphorbiaceae and promoted to family status as Phyllanthaceae.

=== Etymology ===
The genus name Cleistanthus is derived from the Ancient Greek words kleistós (closed), and ánthos (flower), and refers to the petals being enclosed by the calyx in some species. The species epithet apodus means sessile or stalkless.

== Distribution and habitat ==
This species occurs in northeast Queensland and New Guinea. In Queensland, the natural range is from the Torres Strait Islands south through Cape York Peninsula to the area near Ingham. There is also a single confirmed collection a little way south of Home Hill, approximately 190 km (120 mi) to the southeast of Ingham.

It grows in well developed rainforest and semi-deciduous vine forest on a variety of soil types, particularly on the margins of rivers and streams.

== Conservation ==
The weeping Cleistanthus has been assessed by both the Queensland Government's Department of Environment and Science and the International Union for Conservation of Nature (IUCN) as least concern.

== Gallery ==
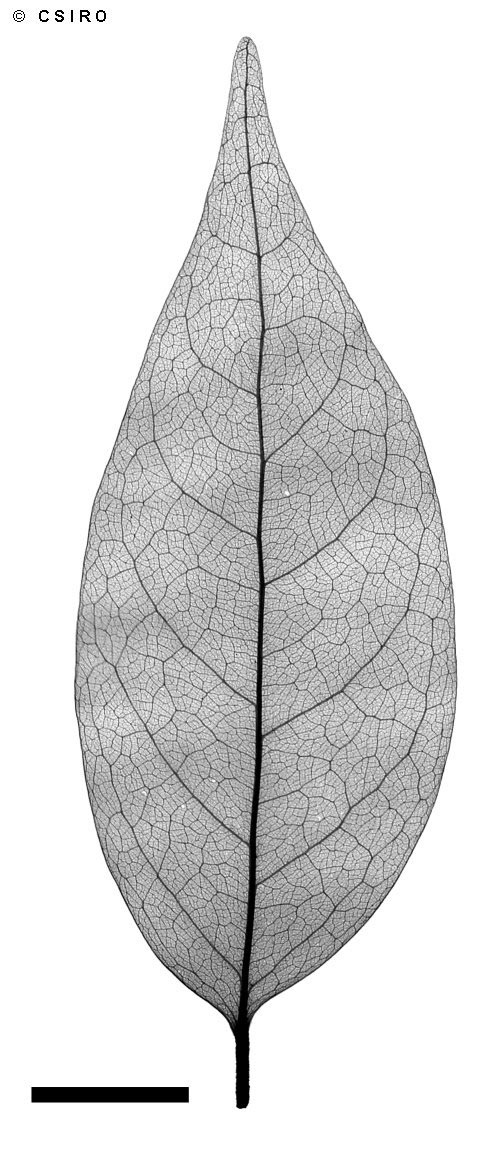
X-ray of leaf

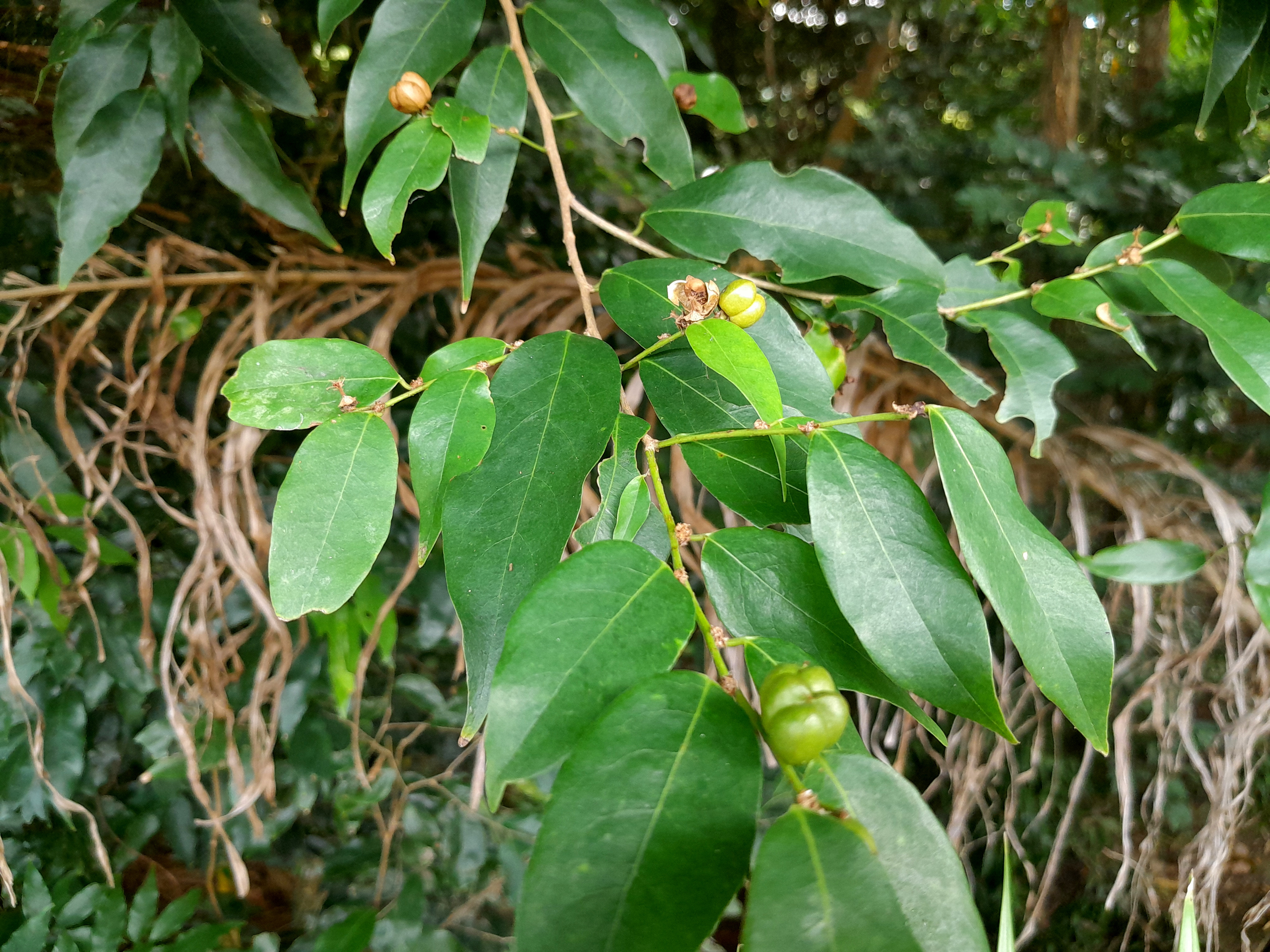
Foliage and maturing fruit

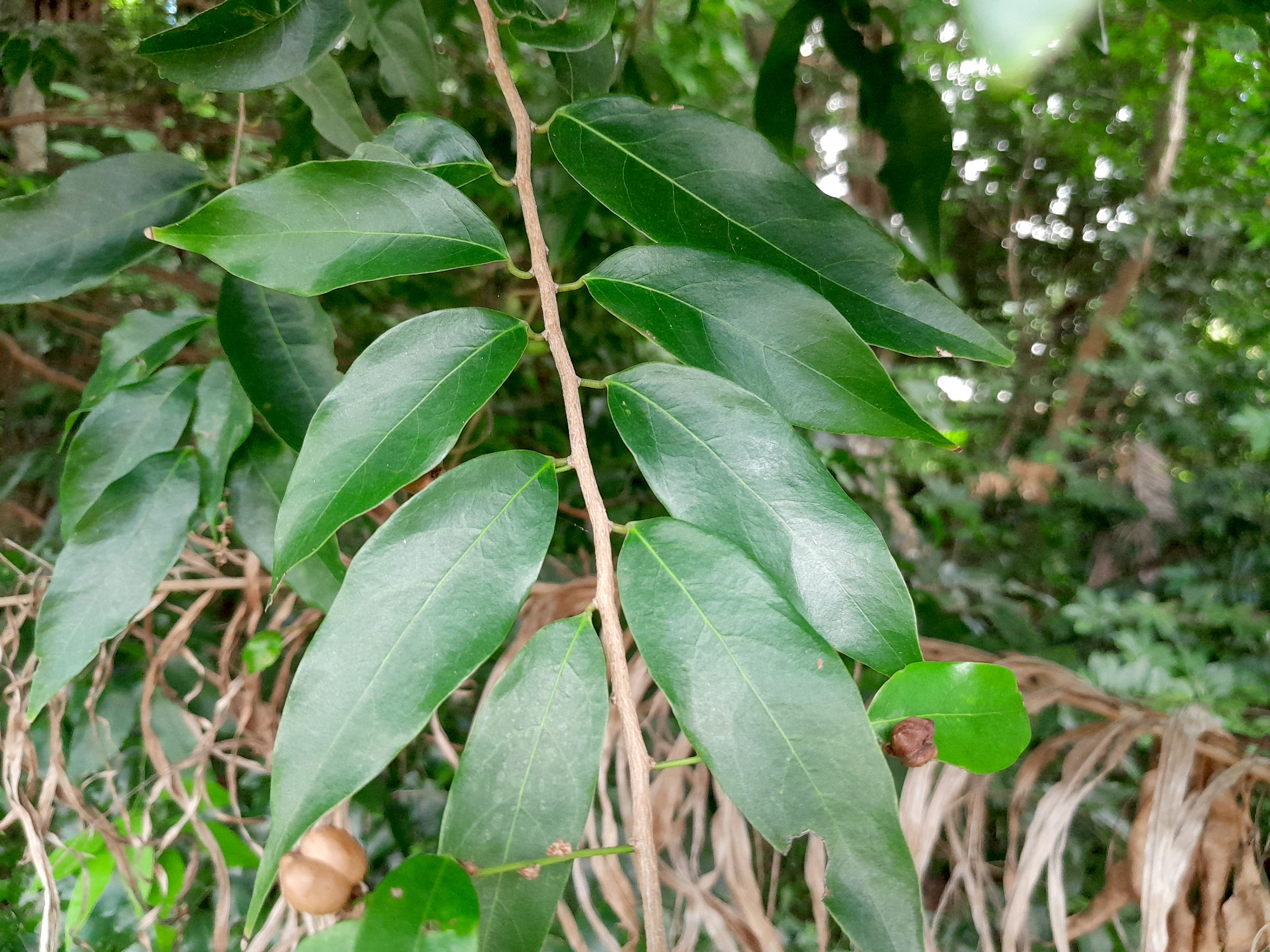
Foliage

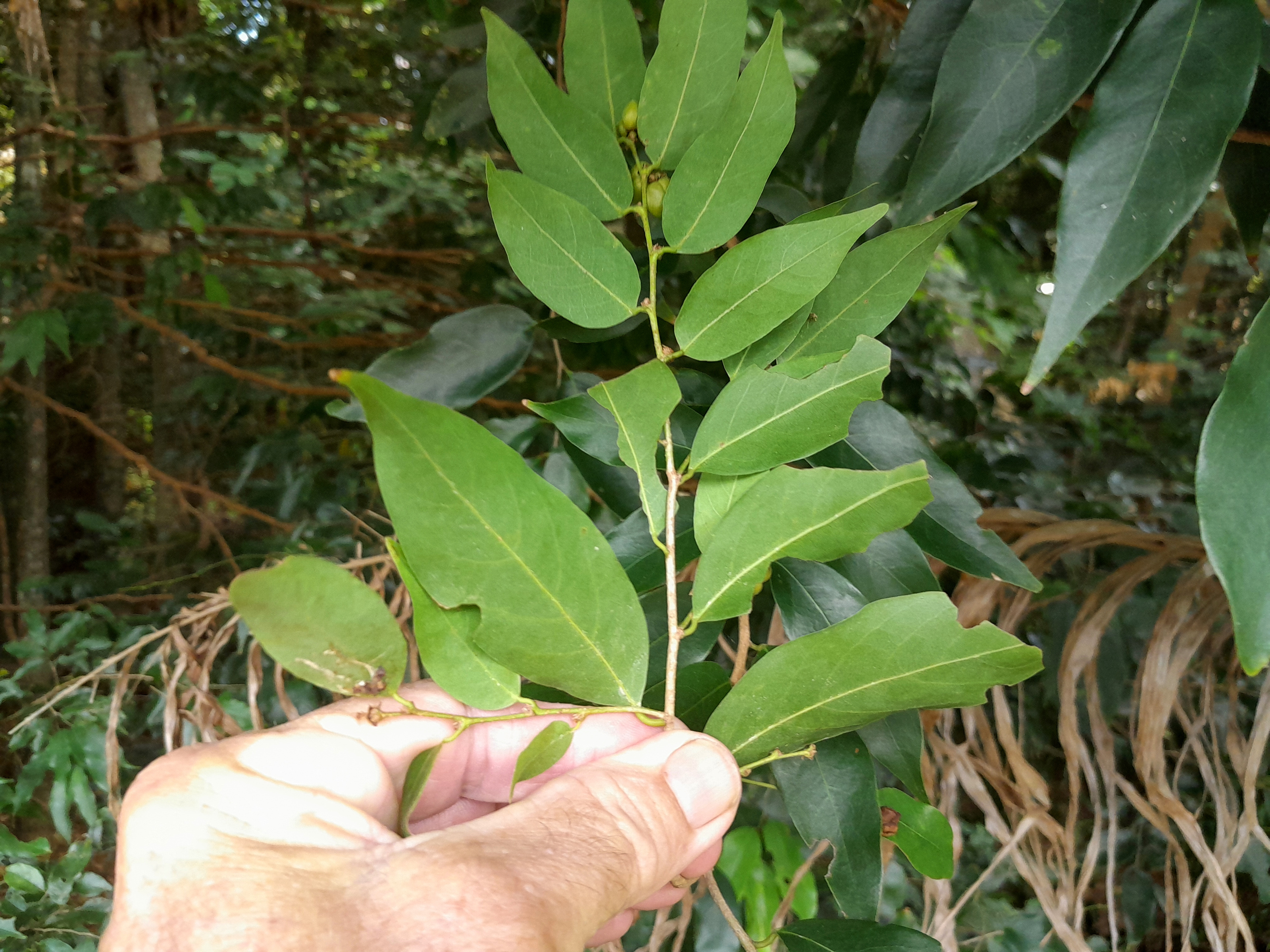
Underside of leaves
