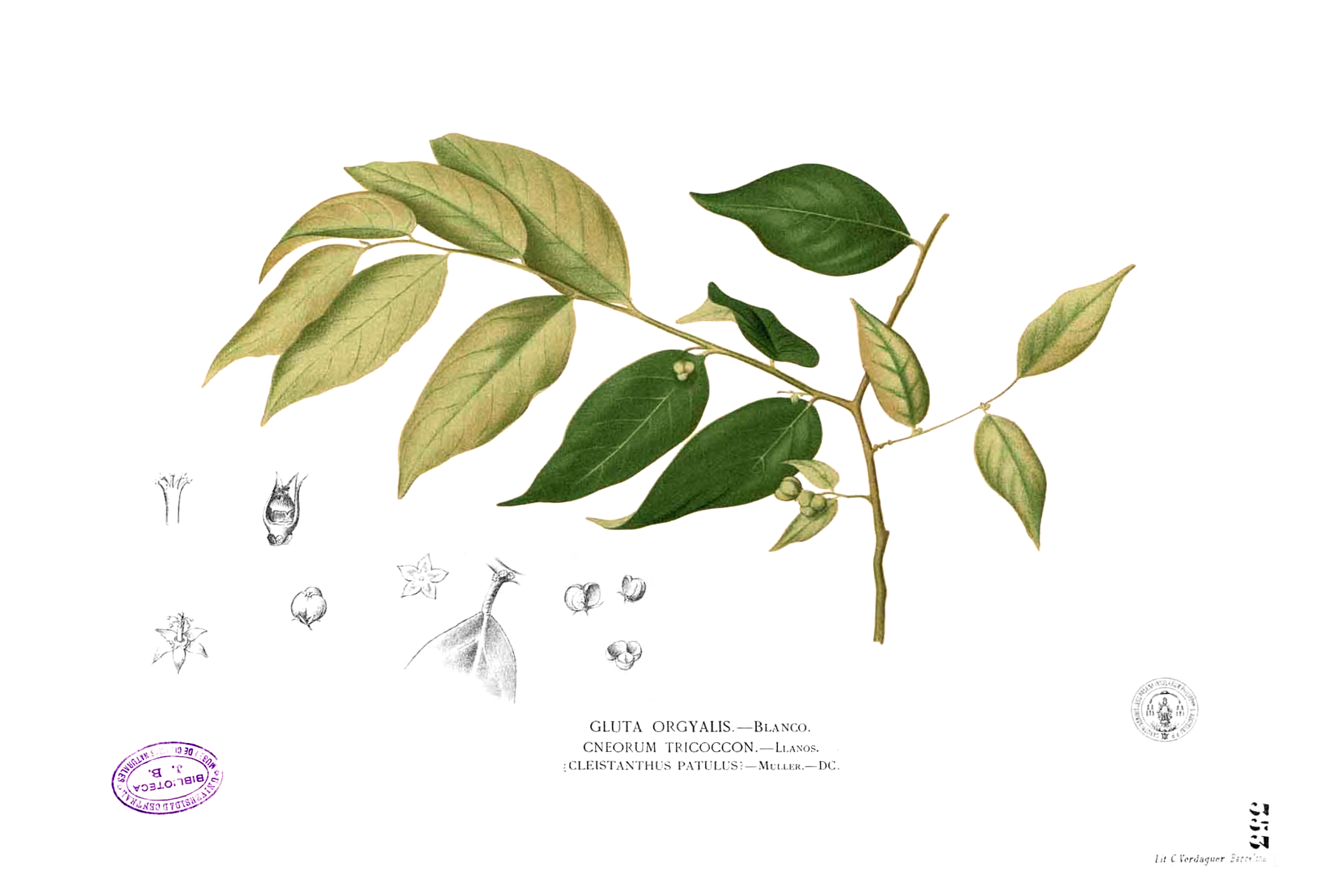
- "Cleistanthus orgyalis", which is a synonym of C. sumatranus

Scientific classification
- Kingdom: Plantae
- Clade: Tracheophytes
- Clade: Angiosperms
- Clade: Eudicots
- Clade: Rosids
- Order: Malpighiales
- Family: Phyllanthaceae
- Genus: Cleistanthus
- Species: C. sumatranus

Binomial name
- Cleistanthus sumatranus (Miq.) Müll.Arg.

Synonyms
- Cleistanthus blancoi Vidal [Illegitimate] Cleistanthus blancoi Rolfe [Illegitimate] Cleistanthus euphlebius Merr. Cleistanthus ferrugineus Fern.-Vill. [Illegitimate] Cleistanthus heterophyllus Hook.f. Cleistanthus laevigatus Jabl. Cleistanthus laevis Hook.f. Cleistanthus minahassae Koord. Cleistanthus oligophlebius Merr. Cleistanthus orgyalis (Blanco) Merr. Cleistanthus saichikii Merr. Cleistanthus vidalii C.B.Rob. Gluta orgyalis Blanco [Invalid] Kaluhaburunghos blancoi (Rolfe) Kuntze; Kaluhaburunghos heterophyllus (Hook.f.) Kuntze; Kaluhaburunghos laevis (Hook.f.) Kuntze; Kaluhaburunghos sumatranus (Miq.) Kuntze; Leiopyxis sumatrana Miq. Paracleisthus subgracilis Gagnep.

= Cleistanthus sumatranus =

Species of tree

Cleistanthus sumatranus is an accepted name of a tree species in the genus Cleistanthus (family Phyllanthaceae). No subspecies are listed in the Catalogue of Life.

It is found in dense deciduous or evergreen forests, from sea level to approximately 700 m (2,300 ft) in Brunei, Cambodia, southern China, Indonesia, Malaysia, Philippines, Singapore, Thailand, and Vietnam. In Chinese, it is called 闭花木 bi hua mu and in Vietnamese Cách hoa (Sumatra).

== Description ==
Cleistanthus sumatranus is an evergreen tree, growing up to 18 m (59 ft) tall.

The leaves have 2–7 mm (0.079–0.276 in) petioles with elliptical leaf blades which are typically 30–100 mm (1.2–3.9 in) by 20–50 mm (0.79–1.97 in). Flowers are small, each with five sepals and five small petals (both male and female), with up to seven occurring in axillary fascicles, subtended by normal or smaller leaves, or on leafless spike-like axes. Flowering is typically from March–August; fruiting from April–October. The capsules are red and ovoid, approximately 10 by 10 mm (0.4 by 0.4 in), containing seeds which are usually single and up to 6 mm (0.24 in) in diameter.
