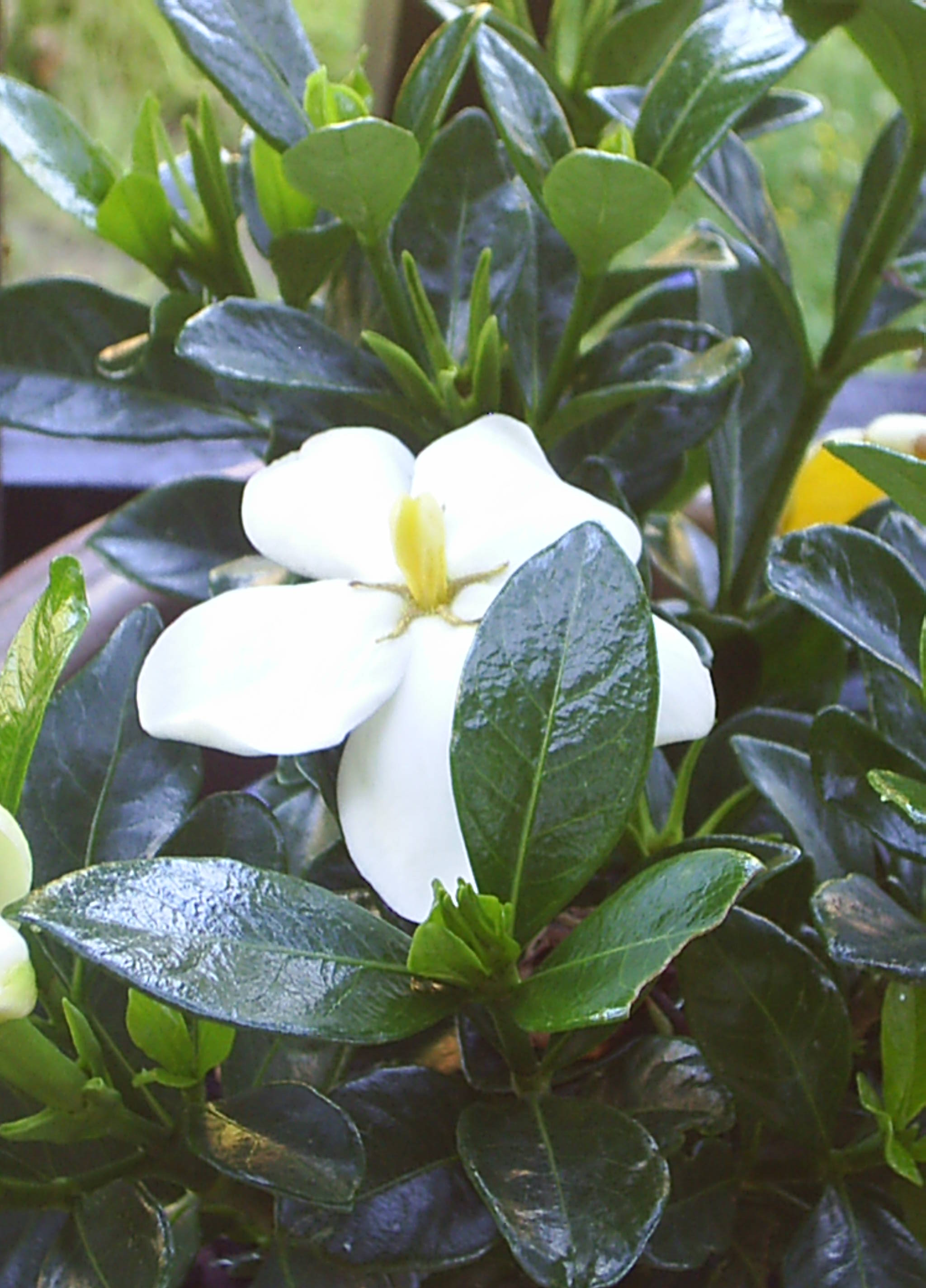
- Gardenia jasminoides

Scientific classification
- Kingdom: Plantae
- Clade: Embryophytes
- Clade: Tracheophytes
- Clade: Angiosperms
- Clade: Eudicots
- Clade: Asterids
- Order: Gentianales
- Family: Rubiaceae
- Subfamily: Ixoroideae
- Tribe: Gardenieae; A.Rich. ex DC.

Type genus
- Gardenia J.Ellis

= Gardenieae =

Tribe of flowering plants in the coffee family

Gardenieae is a tribe of flowering plants in the family Rubiaceae and contains about 586 species in 53 genera.

== Genera ==
Currently accepted names

- Adenorandia Vermoesen (1 sp)
- Agouticarpa C.H.Press. (7 sp)
- Aidia Lour. (55 sp)
- Aidiopsis Tirveng. (1 sp)
- Alleizettella Pit. (2 sp)
- Aoranthe Somers (5 sp)
- Atractocarpus Schltr. & K.Krause (29 sp)
- Aulacocalyx Hook.f. (12 sp)
- Benkara Adans. (19 sp)
- Brachytome Hook.f. (8 sp)
- Brenania Keay (2 sp)
- Bungarimba K.M.Wong (4 sp)
- Calochone Keay (2 sp)
- Casasia A.Rich (10 sp)
- Catunaregam Wolf (12 sp)
- Ceriscoides (Hook.f.) Tirveng. (11 sp)
- Coddia Verdc. (1 sp)
- Deccania Tirveng. (1 sp)
- Dioecrescis Tirveng. (1 sp)
- Duperrea Pierre ex Pit. (1 sp)
- Euclinia Salisb. (3 sp)
- Fosbergia Tirveng. & Sastre (4 sp)
- Ganguelia Robbr. (1 sp)
- Gardenia J.Ellis (134 sp)
- Gardeniopsis Miq. (1 sp)
- Genipa L. (3 sp)
- Heinsenia K.Schum. (1 sp)
- Himalrandia T.Yamaz. (2 sp)
- Hyperacanthus E.Mey. ex Bridson (11 sp)
- Kailarsenia Tirveng. (6 sp)
- Kochummenia K.M.Wong (2 sp)
- Larsenaikia Tirveng. (3 sp)
- Macrosphyra Hook.f. (3 sp)
- Massularia (K.Schum.) Hoyle (1 sp)
- Morelia A.Rich ex DC. (1 sp)
- Oligocodon Keay (1 sp)
- Oxyceros Lour. (12 sp)
- Phellocalyx Bridson (1 sp)
- Pleiocoryne Rauschert (1 sp)
- Porterandia Ridl. (23 sp)
- Preussiodora Keay (1 sp)
- Pseudaidia Tirveng. (1 sp)
- Pseudomantalania J.-F.Leroy (1 sp)
- Randia L. (101 sp)
- Ridsdalea
- Rosenbergiodendron Fagerl. (4 sp)
- Rothmannia Thunb. (42 sp)
- Rubovietnamia Triveng. (2 sp)
- Schumanniophyton Harms (3 sp)
- Singaporandia (Hook.f.) K.M.Wong (1 sp)
- Sphinctanthus Benth. (8 sp)
- Tamilnadia Tirveng. & Sastre (1 sp)
- Tarennoidea Tirveng. & Sastre (2 sp)
- Tocoyena Aubl. (19 sp)
- Vidalasia Tirveng. (5 sp)

Synonyms

- Anamanthodia Hook.f. = Aidia
- Angusta J.Ellis = Gardenia
- Assidora A.Chev. = Schumanniophyton
- Basanacantha Hook.f. = Randia
- Bergkias Sonn. = Gardenia
- Buttneria P.Browne = Casasia
- Canthopsis Miq. = Catunaregam
- Caquepiria J.F.Gmel. = Gardenia
- Ceriscus Gaertn. = Catunaregam
- Chalazocarpus Hiern = Schumanniophyton
- Conosiphon Poepp. = Sphinctanthus
- Cupia (Schult.) DC. = Aidia
- Decameria Welw. = Gardenia
- Dorothea Wernham = Aulacocalyx
- Fagerlindia Tirveng. = Benkara
- Foscarenia Vell. ex Vand. = Randia
- Franciella Guillaumin = Atractocarpus
- Griffithia Wight & Arn. = Benkara
- Gynopachis Blume = Aidia
- Lachnosiphonium Hochst. = Catunaregam
- Lepipogon G.Bertol. = Catunaregam
- Narega Raf. = Catunaregam
- Neofranciella Guillaumin = Atractocarpus
- Pelagodendron Seem. = Aidia
- Piringa Juss. = Gardenia
- Plastolaena Pierre ex A.Chev. = Schumanniophyton
- Pleimeris Raf. = Gardenia
- Polycoryne Keay = Pleiocoryne
- Pseudixora Miq. = Aidia
- Pseudogardenia Keay = Adenorandia
- Sahlbergia Neck. = Gardenia
- Stylocoryna Cav. = Aidia
- Stylocoryne Wight & Arn. = Aidia
- Sukunia A.C.Sm. = Atractocarpus
- Sulipa Blanco = Gardenia
- Sulitia Merr. = Atractocarpus
- Tetrastigma K.Schum. = Schumanniophyton
- Thunbergia Montin = Gardenia
- Trukia Kaneh. = Atractocarpus
- Ucriana Willd. = Tocoyena
- Varneria L. = Gardenia
- Warneria J.Ellis = Gardenia
- Xeromphis Raf. = Catunaregam
- Yangapa Raf. = Gardenia
