= Byrsophyllum =

Scientific classification
- Kingdom: Plantae
- Clade: Tracheophytes
- Clade: Angiosperms
- Clade: Eudicots
- Clade: Asterids
- Order: Gentianales
- Family: Rubiaceae
- Subfamily: Ixoroideae
- Tribe: Gardenieae
- Genus: Byrsophyllum; Hook.f.

Genus of plants

Byrsophyllum is a genus of flowering plants in the family Rubiaceae. It belongs to the subfamily Ixoroideae and the tribe Gardenieae.

The genus is native to India and Sri Lanka.

== Species ==
- Byrsophyllum ellipticum (Thwaites) Hook.f. - Sri Lanka
- Byrsophyllum tetrandrum (Bedd.) Hook.f. - India
