= Sphinctanthus =

Scientific classification
- Kingdom: Plantae
- Clade: Embryophytes
- Clade: Tracheophytes
- Clade: Angiosperms
- Clade: Eudicots
- Clade: Asterids
- Order: Gentianales
- Family: Rubiaceae
- Subfamily: Ixoroideae
- Tribe: Gardenieae
- Genus: Sphinctanthus; Benth.

Species
- See text

Synonyms
- Conosiphon Poepp.

Genus of flowering plants

Sphinctanthus is a genus of flowering plants in the family Rubiaceae, native to tropical South America. It is in a clade with Rosenbergiodendron and Tocoyena.

== Species ==
Currently accepted species include:

- Sphinctanthus acutilobus Huber
- Sphinctanthus aurantiacus (Standl.) Fagerl.
- Sphinctanthus fluvii-dulcis Delprete & C.H.Perss.
- Sphinctanthus hasslerianus Chodat
- Sphinctanthus insignis Steyerm.
- Sphinctanthus maculatus Spruce ex K.Schum.
- Sphinctanthus microphyllus K.Schum.
- Sphinctanthus polycarpus (H.Karst.) Hook.f.
- Sphinctanthus striiflorus (DC.) Hook.f. ex K.Schum.
