= Bungarimba =

Scientific classification
- Kingdom: Plantae
- Clade: Tracheophytes
- Clade: Angiosperms
- Clade: Eudicots
- Clade: Asterids
- Order: Gentianales
- Family: Rubiaceae
- Subfamily: Ixoroideae
- Tribe: Gardenieae
- Genus: Bungarimba; K.M.Wong

Type species
- Bungarimba sessiliflora (Ridl.) K.M.Wong

Genus of plants

Bungarimba is a genus of flowering plants in the family Rubiaceae. The type species was transferred from Porterandia by K.M. Wong in 2004. The genus is found from Borneo, Malaysia, Sumatra and New Guinea.

== Species ==
- Bungarimba kahayanensis K.M.Wong - Kalimantan
- Bungarimba papuana K.M.Wong - Papua New Guinea
- Bungarimba ridsdalei K.M.Wong - Sabah
- Bungarimba sessiliflora (Ridl.) K.M.Wong - Borneo, Malaysia, Sumatra
