= Morelia (disambiguation) =

Morelia is the capital of the state of Michoacán, Mexico.

Morelia may also refer to:

== Places ==
- Morelia, Chiapas, a hamlet in the municipality of Altamirano, Mexico
- Morelia, Caquetá, a municipality in Colombia

== Genera ==
- Morelia (snake), a genus of pythons found in Australia, Indonesia and New Guinea
- Morelia (plant), a genus of plants (family Rubiaceae)

== Other uses ==
- Monarcas Morelia (a.k.a. "el Morelia"), a Mexican football team
- Morelia (TV series), a Mexican telenovela
  - "Morelia", the theme song from the telenovela performed by Cristian Castro and included on the album El Deseo de Oír Tu Voz
- Morelia, a 2019 novel by Renee Gladman
