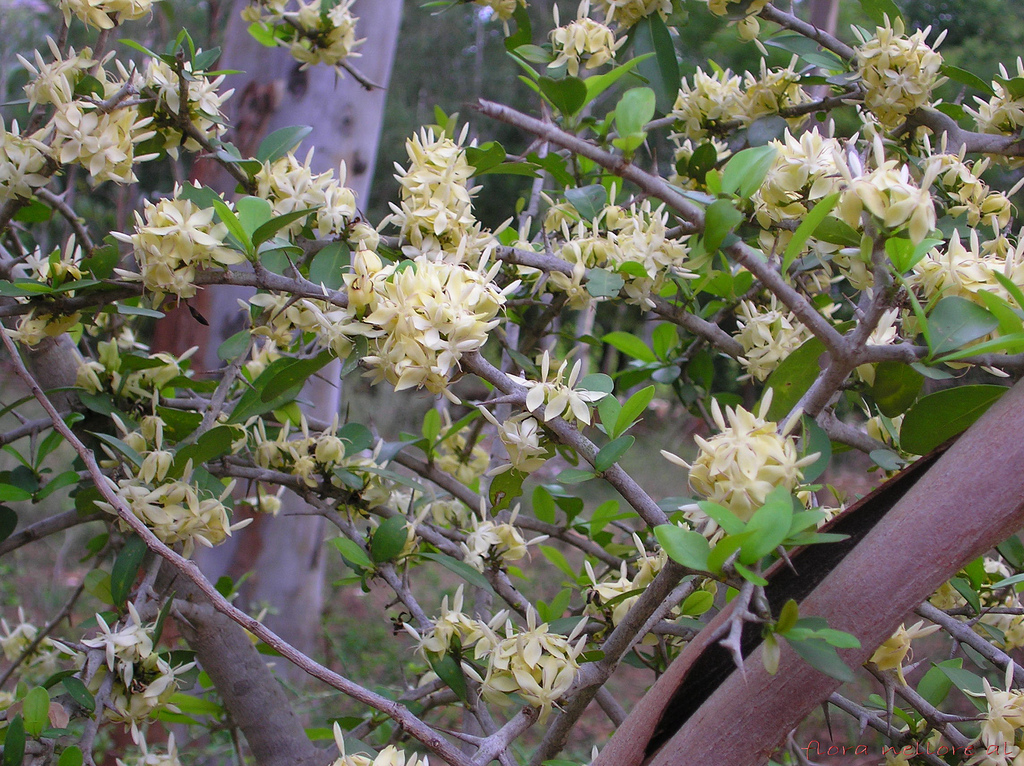

Scientific classification
- Kingdom: Plantae
- Clade: Tracheophytes
- Clade: Angiosperms
- Clade: Eudicots
- Clade: Asterids
- Order: Gentianales
- Family: Rubiaceae
- Tribe: Gardenieae
- Genus: Benkara
- Species: B. malabarica

Binomial name
- Benkara malabarica (Lam.) Tirveng.

= Benkara malabarica =

Genus of plants

Benkara malabarica is a shrub found in India and Sri Lanka. Simple or branched thorns are seen on the stem. The leaves are simple, opposite, and decussate. It has creamy white flowers, and the fruit is a berry containing multiple seeds.

== Gallery ==
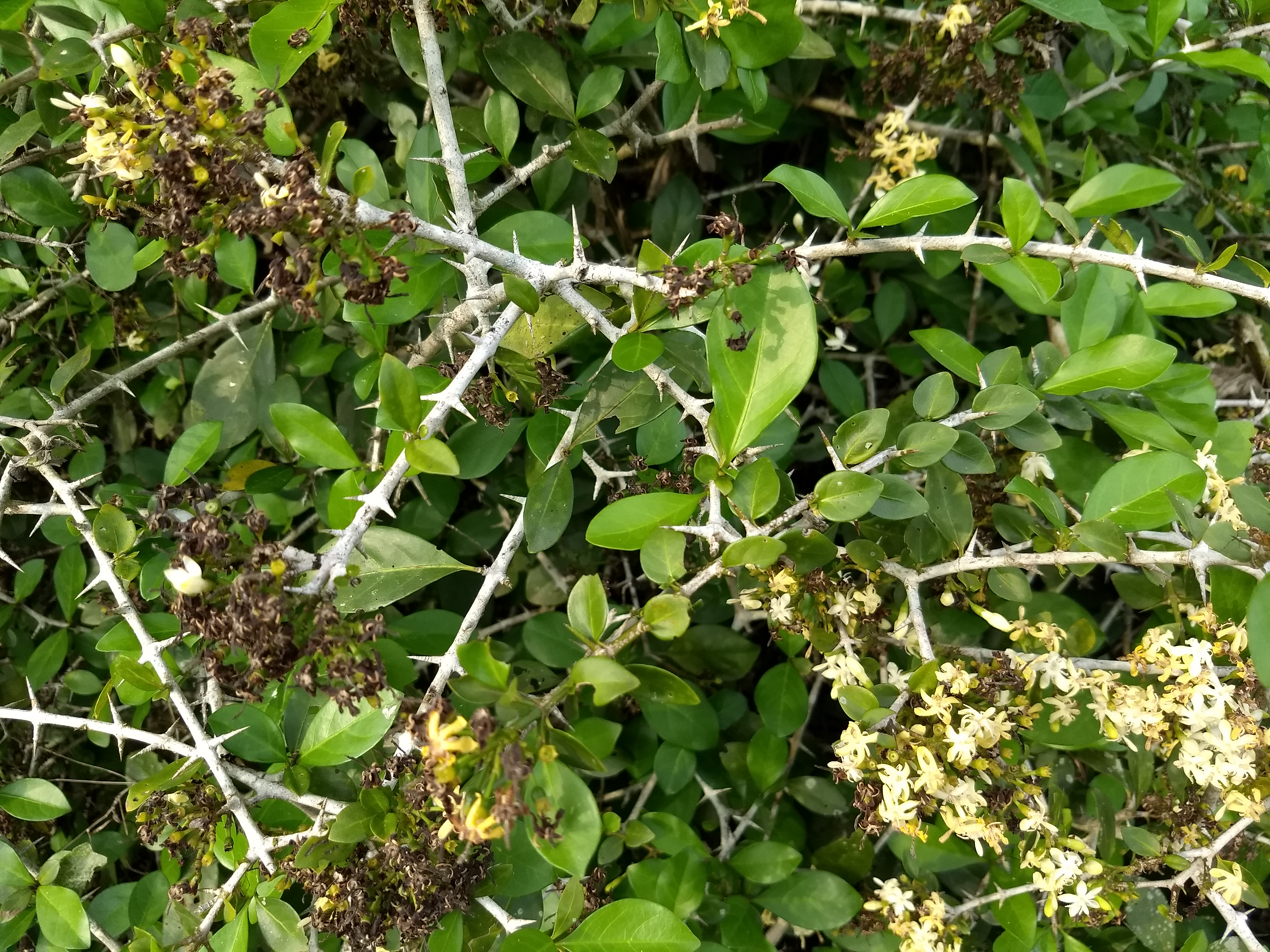
Plant

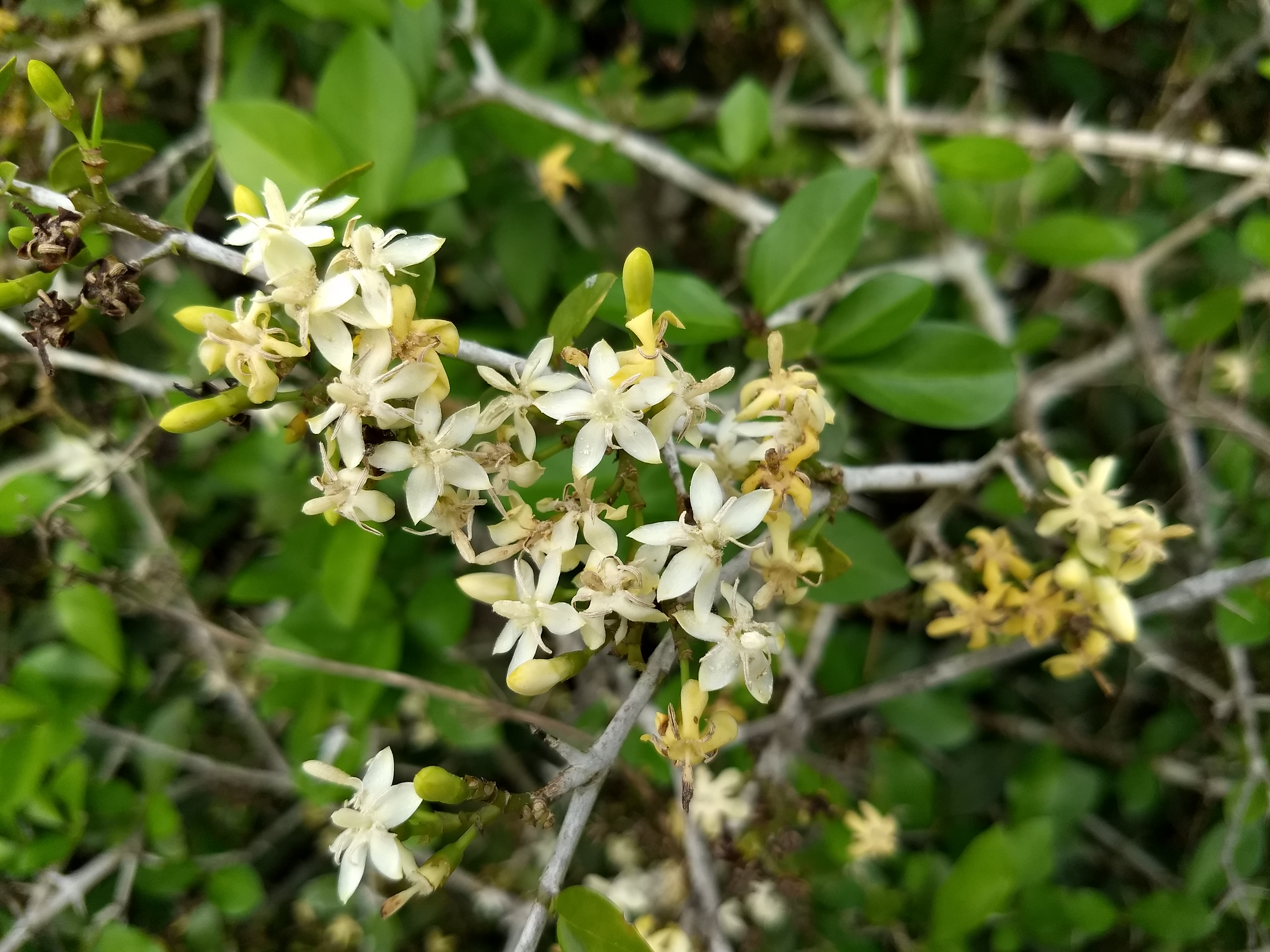
Flowers

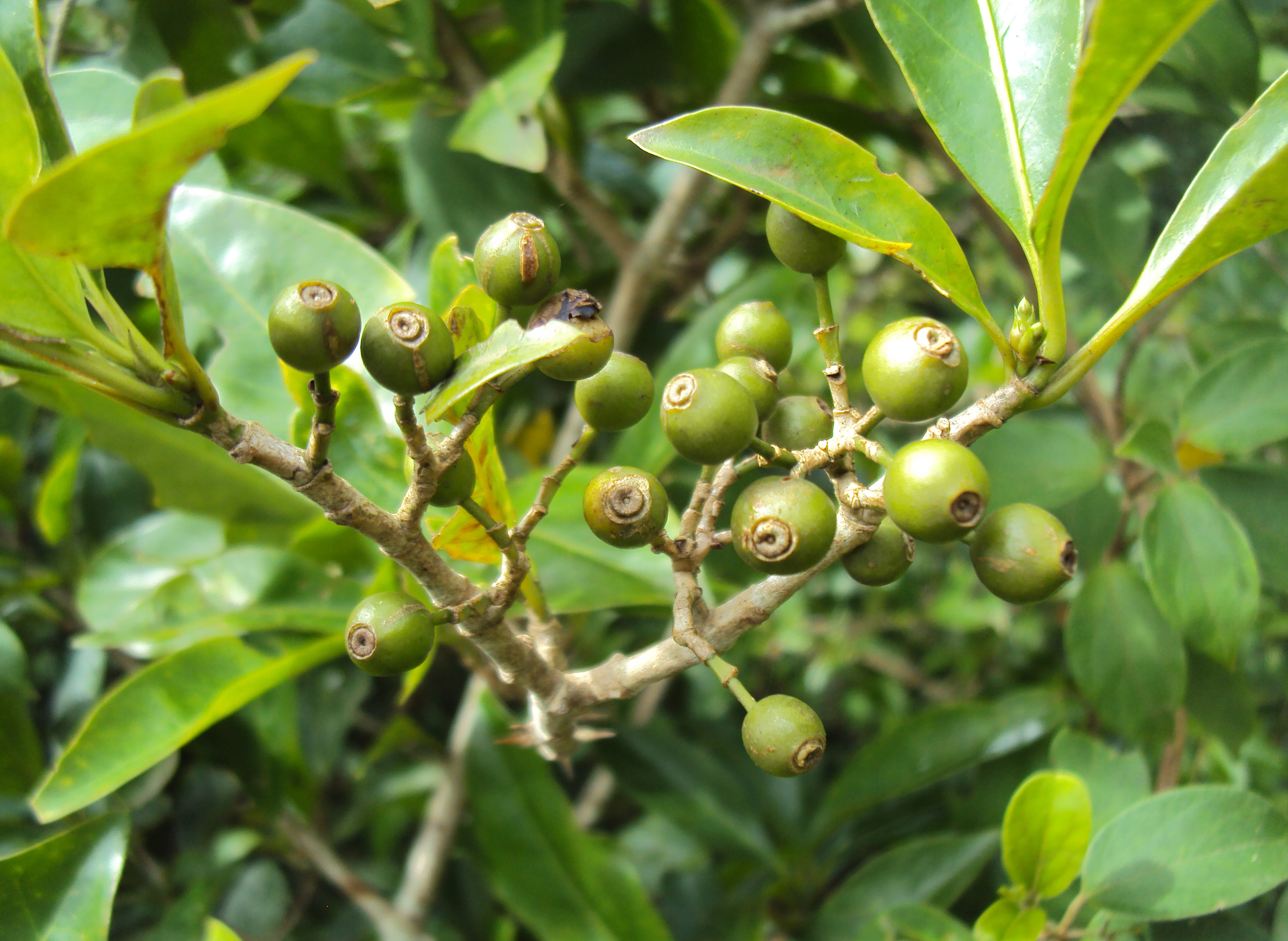
Fruits
