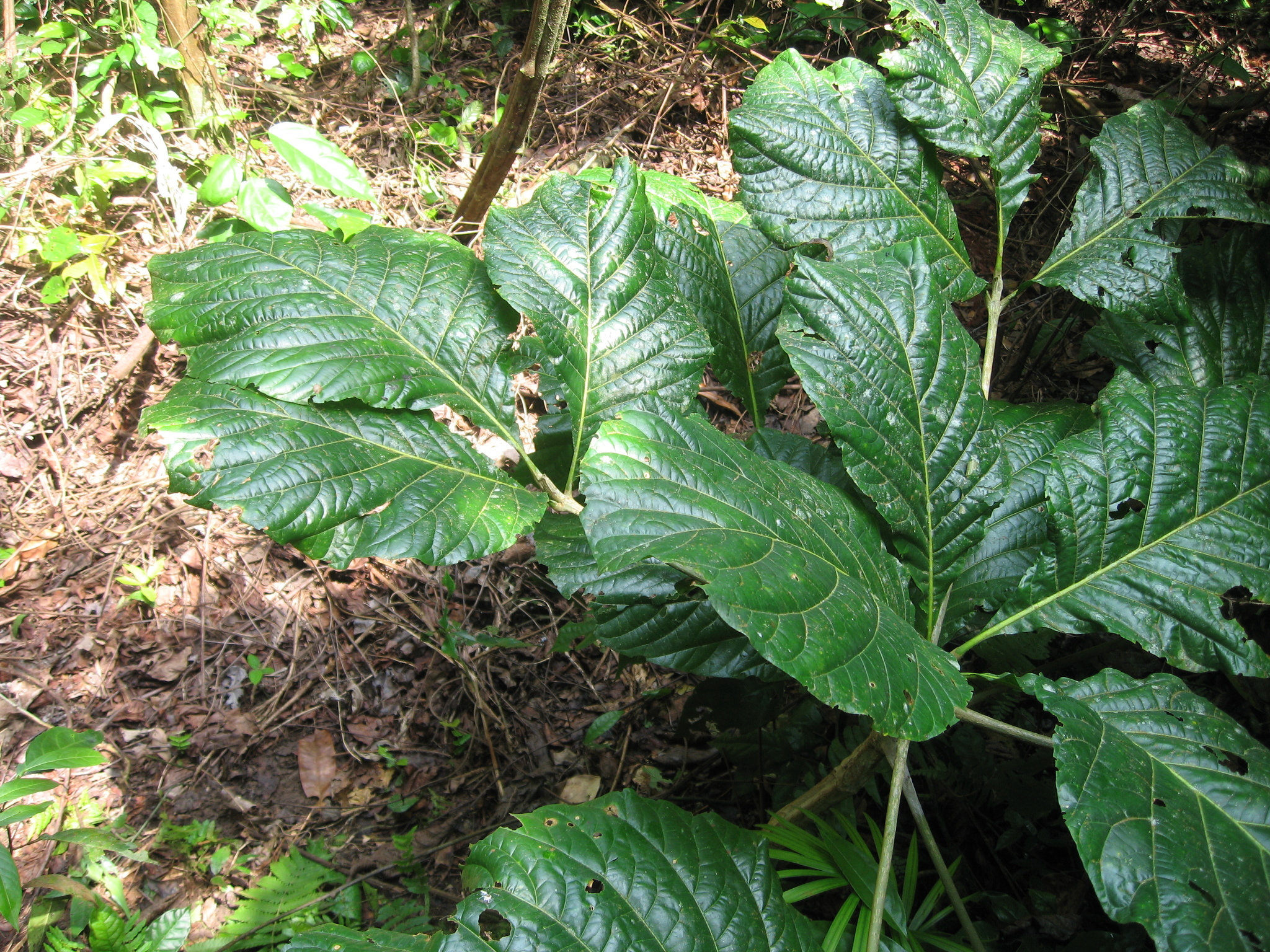
- In Ghana

Conservation status
- Vulnerable (IUCN 2.3)

Scientific classification
- Kingdom: Plantae
- Clade: Tracheophytes
- Clade: Angiosperms
- Clade: Eudicots
- Clade: Asterids
- Order: Gentianales
- Family: Rubiaceae
- Genus: Schumanniophyton
- Species: S. problematicum

Binomial name
- Schumanniophyton problematicum (A.Chev.) Aubrev.

Synonyms
- Assidora problematica A.Chev.

= Schumanniophyton problematicum =

Species of plant

Schumanniophyton problematicum is a species of plant in the family Rubiaceae. It is found in Ivory Coast, Ghana, and Sierra Leone. It is threatened by habitat loss.

== Chemistry ==
The plant has been found to contain the alkaloids rohitukine and rohitukine N-oxide, and the iridoid glycosides scyphiphorin A1–A2 and scyphiphorin B1–B2. Alvocidib is a synthetic analog of rohitukine that acts as a CDK9 kinase inhibitor and is under clinical development for the treatment of acute myeloid leukemia. It has also been studied for the treatment of arthritis and atherosclerotic plaque formation

Rohitukine was initially extracted from Aphanamixis polystachya (the alkaloid name being derived from the synonym Amoora rohituka) and later from Dysoxylum binectariferum. - both of which plant species belong to the family Meliaceae.

The scyphiphorins were first isolated from (and subsequently named for) Scyphiphora hydrophylacea, which, like Schumanniophyton, belongs to the plant family Rubiaceae.
