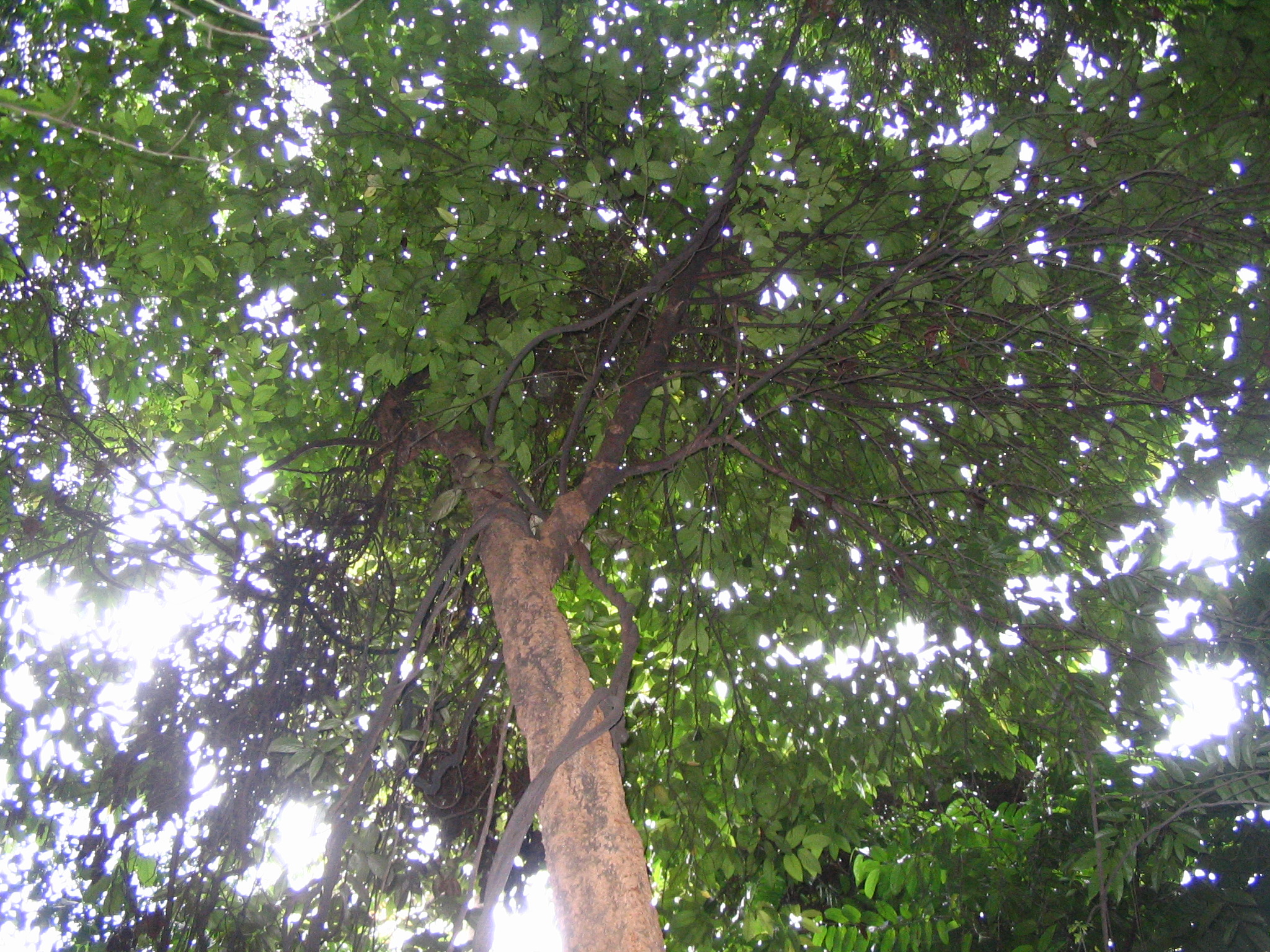
- Aidia wallichiana

Scientific classification
- Kingdom: Plantae
- Clade: Tracheophytes
- Clade: Angiosperms
- Clade: Eudicots
- Clade: Asterids
- Order: Gentianales
- Family: Rubiaceae
- Subfamily: Ixoroideae
- Tribe: Gardenieae
- Genus: Aidia; Lour.

Type species
- Aidia cochinchinensis Lour.

Synonyms
- Anomanthodia Hook.f.; Cupia (Schult.) DC.; Gynopachis Blume; Pelagodendron Seem.; Pseudixora Miq.; Stylocoryna Cav.; Stylocoryne Wight & Arn.

= Aidia =

Genus of plants

Aidia is a genus of flowering plants in the family Rubiaceae. It was described by João de Loureiro in 1790. It has a wide distribution area and occurs in tropical Africa, tropical and subtropical Asia and the western Pacific.

== Species ==
- Aidia abeidii S.E.Dawson & Gereau
- Aidia acuminata (Blume) K.M.Wong
- Aidia acutipetala Ridsdale
- Aidia auriculata (Wall.) Ridsdale
- Aidia bakeri (Merr.) Ridsdale
- Aidia beccariana (Baill.) Ridsdale
- Aidia borneensis Ridsdale
- Aidia bracteata Ridsdale
- Aidia brisipensis Ridsdale
- Aidia chantonea Triveng.
- Aidia cochinchinensis Lour.
- Aidia congesta (Schltr. & K.Krause) Ridsdale
- Aidia corymbosa (Blume) K.M.Wong
- Aidia cowleyi Puttock
- Aidia densiflora (Wall.) Masam.
- Aidia dilleniacea (Baill.) Ridsdale
- Aidia endertii Ridsdale
- Aidia foveata Ridsdale
- Aidia gardneri (Thwaites) Tirveng.
- Aidia genipiflora (DC.) Dandy
- Aidia glabra (Valeton) Ridsdale
- Aidia halleri Ridsdale
- Aidia henryi (E.Pritz.) T.Yamaz.
- Aidia heterophylla Ridsdale
- Aidia impressinervis (King & Gamble) Ridsdale
- Aidia jambosoides (Valeton) Ridsdale
- Aidia kinabaluensis Ridsdale
- Aidia lancifolia K.M.Wong
- Aidia longiflora Ridsdale
- Aidia magnifolia Ridsdale
- Aidia merrillii (Chun) Tirveng.
- Aidia micrantha (K.Schum.) Bullock ex F.White
- Aidia moluccana Ridsdale
- Aidia ochroleuca (K.Schum.) E.M.A.Petit
- Aidia oxyodonta (Drake) T.Yamaz.
- Aidia paiei Ridsdale
- Aidia parvifolia (King & Gamble) K.M.Wong
- Aidia polystachya (Valeton) Ridsdale
- Aidia pseudospicata Ridsdale
- Aidia pulcherrima (Merr.) Ridsdale
- Aidia pycnantha (Drake) Tirveng.
- Aidia quintasii (K.Schum.) G.Taylor
- Aidia racemosa (Cav.) Tirveng.
- Aidia rhacodosepala (K.Schum.) E.M.A.Petit
- Aidia rubens (Hiern) G.Taylor
- Aidia salicifolia (H.L.Li) T.Yamaz.
- Aidia solomonensis Ridsdale
- Aidia tomentosa (Blume) Ridsdale
- Aidia vieillardii (Baill.) Ridsdale
- Aidia vitiensis (Seem.) Puttock
- Aidia wattii G.Taylor
- Aidia waugia Ridsdale
- Aidia yunnanensis (Hutch.) T.Yamaz.
- Aidia zippeliana (Scheff.) Ridsdale
