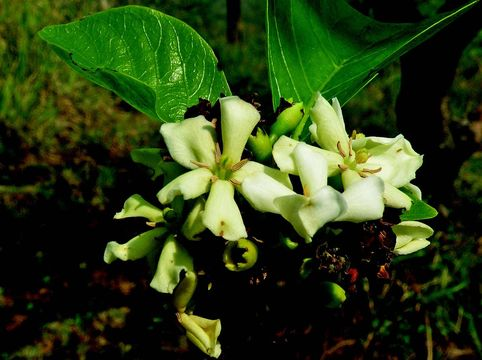
- Deccania pubescens

Scientific classification
- Kingdom: Plantae
- Clade: Tracheophytes
- Clade: Angiosperms
- Clade: Eudicots
- Clade: Asterids
- Order: Gentianales
- Family: Rubiaceae
- Subfamily: Ixoroideae
- Tribe: Gardenieae
- Genus: Deccania; Tirveng.
- Species: D. pubescens

Binomial name
- Deccania pubescens (Roth) Tirveng.

Synonyms
- Gardenia pubescens Roth

= Deccania =

Genus of plants

Deccania is a monotypic genus of flowering plants in the family Rubiaceae. The genus contains only one species, viz. Deccania pubescens, which is endemic to India.
