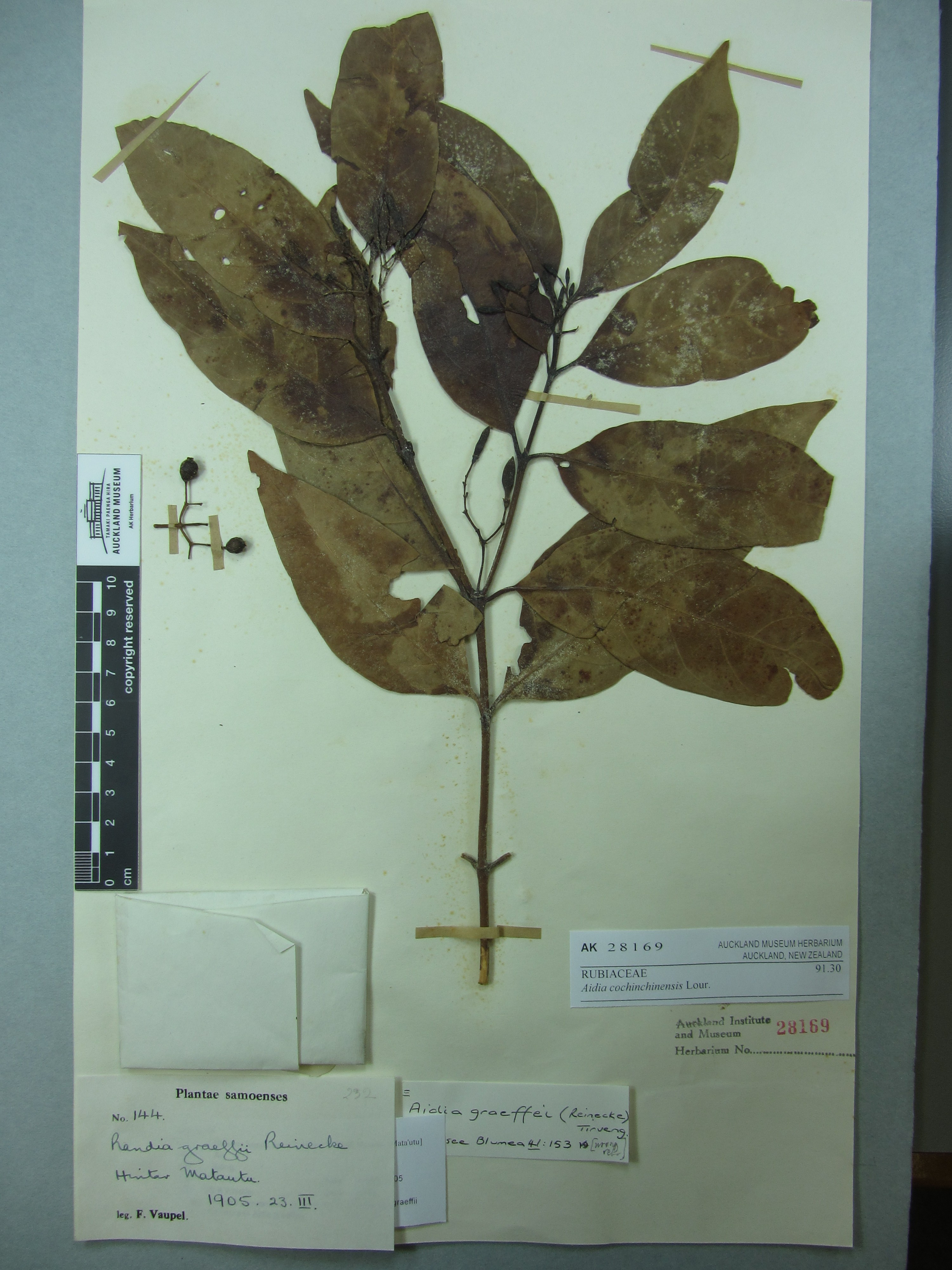

Conservation status
- Least Concern (IUCN 3.1)

Scientific classification
- Kingdom: Plantae
- Clade: Tracheophytes
- Clade: Angiosperms
- Clade: Eudicots
- Clade: Asterids
- Order: Gentianales
- Family: Rubiaceae
- Genus: Aidia
- Species: A. cochinchinensis

Binomial name
- Aidia cochinchinensis Lour.

Synonyms
- Homotypic Synonyms: Fagraea cochinchinensis (Lour.) A.Chev.; Randia cochinchinensis (Lour.) Merr.; Heterotypic Synonyms: Aidia oxyodonta var. microdonta (Pit.) P.H.Hô; Randia oxyodonta var. microdonta Pit.

= Aidia cochinchinensis =

Species of plant

Aidia cochinchinensis is the type species of the genus Aidia, in the family Rubiaceae. It is native to south-central China, including Hainan, and Vietnam.

No subspecies are listed in the Catalogue of Life.

Aidia cochinchinensis has commonly been reported in the Pacific Islands, although Tirvengadum noted that the specimens from the Pacific islands were distinct from Aidia cochinchinensis in Vietnam and in 1983 proposed Aidia racemosa as a unique species in the Pacific. Plants of the World Online (POWO) follows Tirvengadum in identifying the Aidia of the Pacific region, including Australia and Pacific Islands, as A. racemosa.
