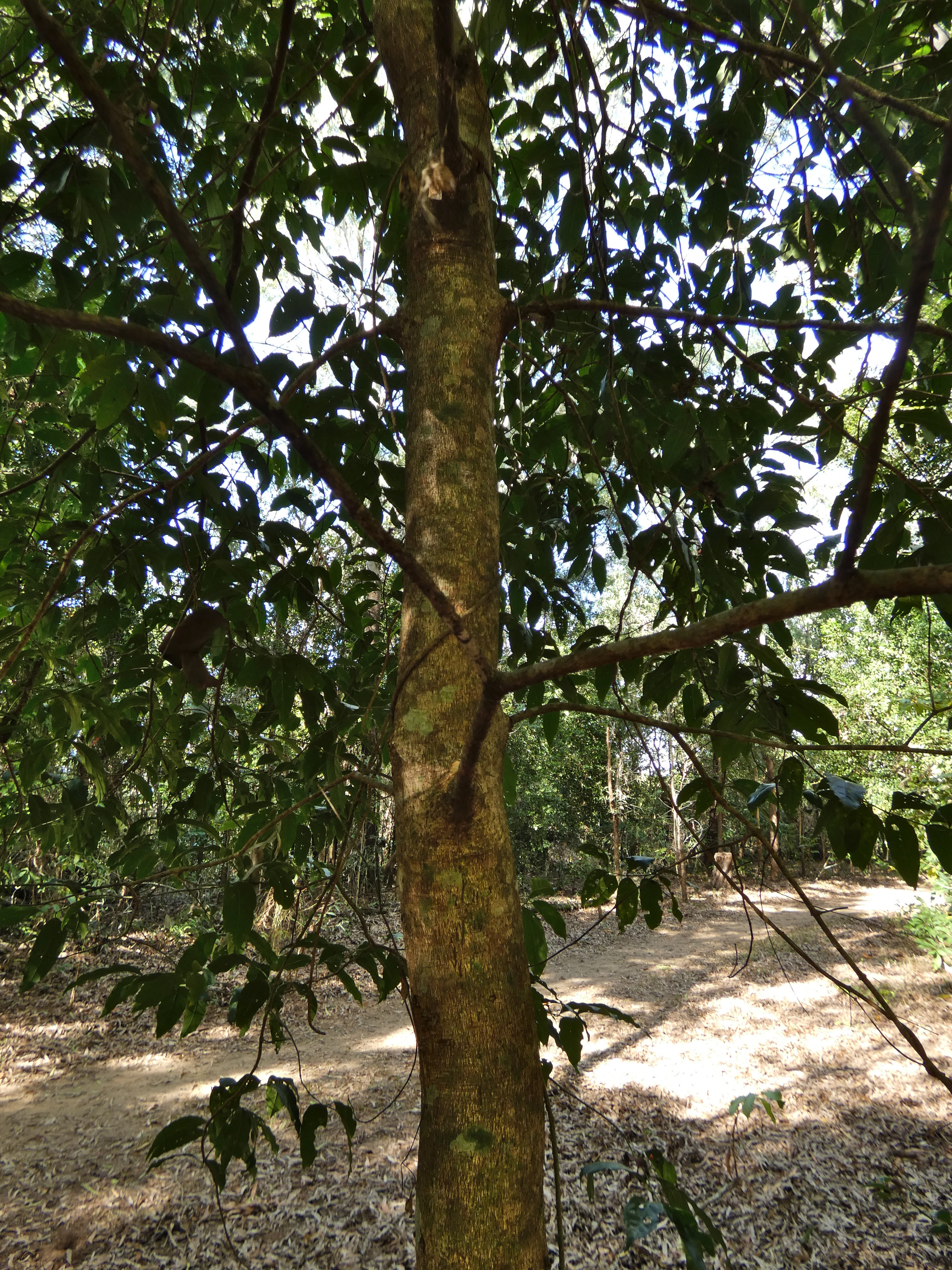
- In Cairns, Australia

Conservation status
- Least Concern (IUCN 3.1)

Scientific classification
- Kingdom: Plantae
- Clade: Embryophytes
- Clade: Tracheophytes
- Clade: Angiosperms
- Clade: Eudicots
- Clade: Asterids
- Order: Gentianales
- Family: Rubiaceae
- Genus: Aidia
- Species: A. racemosa

Binomial name
- Aidia racemosa (Cav.) Tirveng.

Synonyms
- 13 synonyms: Stylocoryna racemosa Cav.; Webera racemosa (Cav.) Boerl.; Aidia graeffei (Reinecke) Tirveng.; Aidia spicata (Valeton) Tirveng.; Aidia thozetiana (F.Muell.) Tirveng.; Gardenia densiflora F.Muell.; Gynopachis axilliflora Miq.; Ixora thozetiana F.Muell.; Randia gaudichaudii Valeton; Randia graeffei Reinecke; Randia graeffei var. alba Reinecke; Randia lamprophylla O.Schwarz; Randia spicata Valeton; Randia suishaensis Hayata

= Aidia racemosa =

Species of flowering plant

Aidia racemosa is a tree in the Rubiaceae family, native to areas from Thailand east to the Pacific islands and south to Australia.

== Distribution ==
Aidia racemosa is native to the following regions: Borneo, Caroline Islands, Christmas Island, Gilbert Islands, Hainan, Jawa, Lesser Sunda Islands, Malaya, Maluku, Mariana Islands, Marshall Islands, Nauru, New Guinea, Nicobar Islands, Philippines, Samoa, Solomon Islands, Sulawesi, Taiwan, Thailand, Tonga, Vanuatu, Vietnam, Wallis-Futuna Islands, and the Australian regions of Northern Territory, Queensland, and Western Australia.

In the Pacific Islands, Aidia has commonly been reported as being Aidia cochinchinensis. However, Tirvengadum noted that the specimens from the Pacific islands were distinct from Aidia cochinchinensis in Vietnam and in 1988 proposed Aidia racemosa as a unique species in the Pacific. Fobserg noted a large diversity of phenotypes in the Pacific islands, and in 1993 retained the name Aidia cochinchinensis as an umbrella term for the Pacific and south Asian types. However, Plants of the World Online (POWO) considers Aidia cochinchinensis (native to south-central China and Vietnam) and Aidia racemosa to be unique species.

== Names ==
Common names for Aidia from various regions include:

- chumag (Marianas)
- smak or snak (Saipan and Rota)
- suma (Agiguan)
- sumac (Guam)
- gulmus, kelmusu, kerms, kerumes, kerums, krumes (Palau)
- gasmatz or gathomatsch (Yap)
- kahmant, katchwel, kent'mant or ken mant (Ponape)
