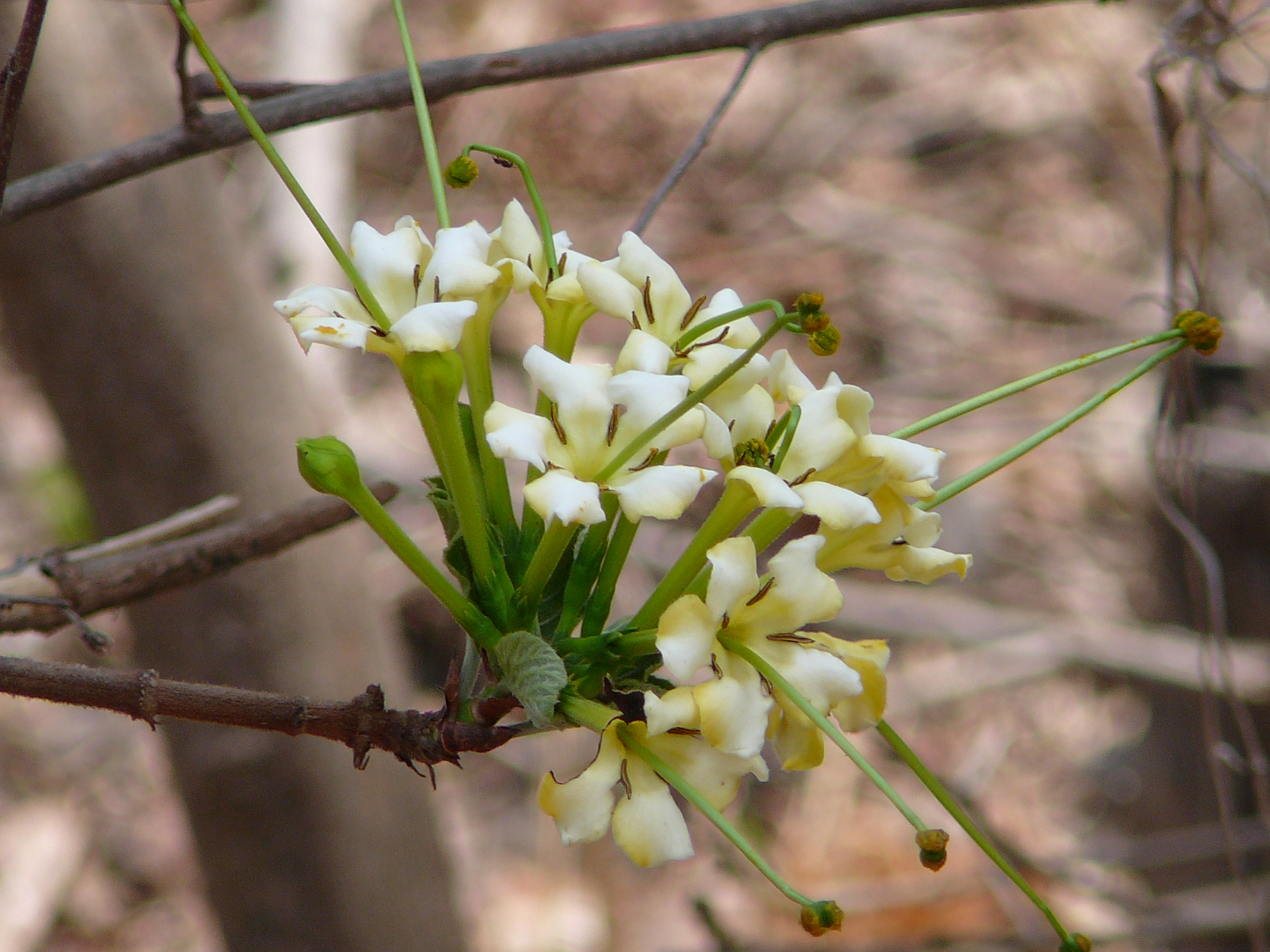
- Macrosphyra longistyla

Scientific classification
- Kingdom: Plantae
- Clade: Embryophytes
- Clade: Tracheophytes
- Clade: Angiosperms
- Clade: Eudicots
- Clade: Asterids
- Order: Gentianales
- Family: Rubiaceae
- Subfamily: Ixoroideae
- Tribe: Gardenieae
- Genus: Macrosphyra; Hook.f.

= Macrosphyra =

Genus of flowering plants in the coffee family

Macrosphyra is a genus of flowering plants in the tribe Gardenieae of the family Rubiaceae native to Africa.

== Species ==
Three species are accepted as of July 2026:

- Macrosphyra brachysiphon Wernham
- Macrosphyra brachystylis Hiern
- Macrosphyra longistyla (DC.) Hook.f. ex Hiern
