= Preussiodora =

Scientific classification
- Kingdom: Plantae
- Clade: Tracheophytes
- Clade: Angiosperms
- Clade: Eudicots
- Clade: Asterids
- Order: Gentianales
- Family: Rubiaceae
- Subfamily: Ixoroideae
- Tribe: Gardenieae
- Genus: Preussiodora; Keay
- Species: P. sulphurea

Binomial name
- Preussiodora sulphurea (K.Schum.) Keay

Synonyms
- Randia sulphurea K.Schum; Randia exserta K.Schum.

Genus of plants

Preussiodora is a genus of plants in the family Rubiaceae. It contains only one species, Preussiodora sulphurea, native to central Africa (Nigeria, Cameroon, Gabon, Congo-Brazzaville, Congo-Kinshasa, and the islands in the Gulf of Guinea).

The genus name of Preussiodora is in honour of Paul Rudolf Preuss (1861–1926), a German botanist and researcher. He founded and directed a botanical garden in Kamerun (now called Cameroon). The Latin specific epithet of sulphurea means sulphur-yellow. Both the genus and the species were first described and published in Bull. Jard. Bot. État Bruxelles Vol.28 on pages 31–32 in 1958.
