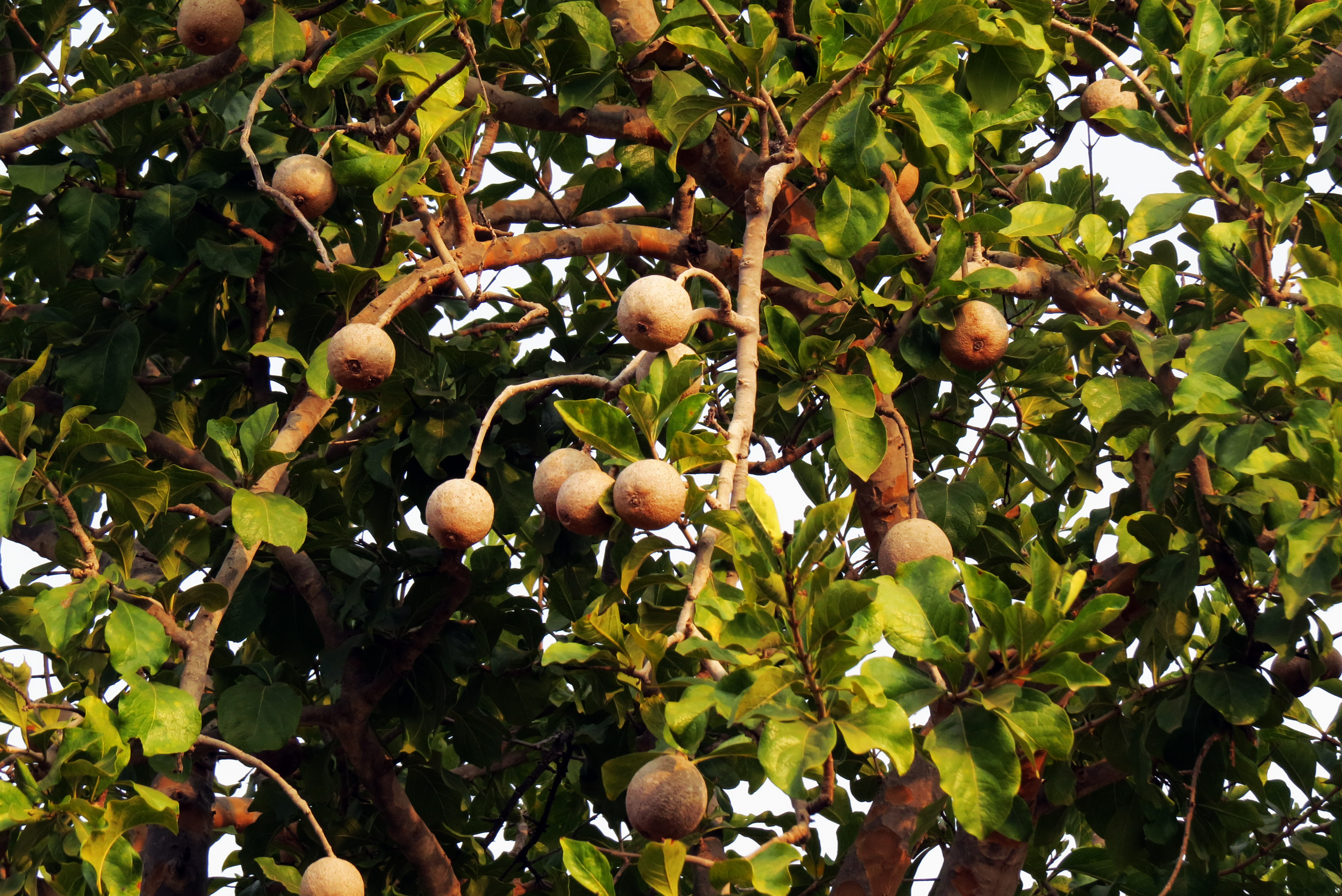
- In Panna National Park
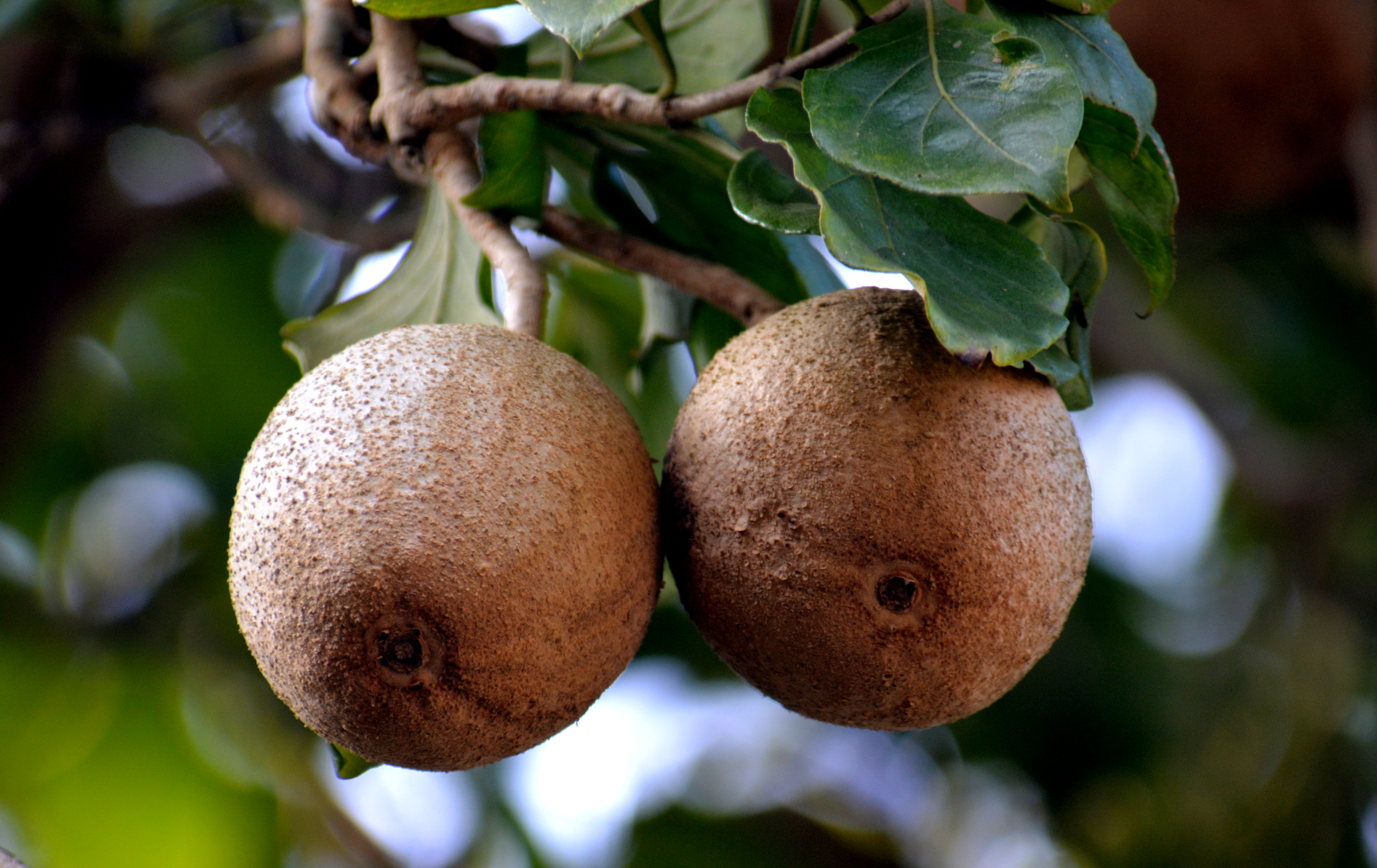
- Close-up of fruit

Scientific classification
- Kingdom: Plantae
- Clade: Embryophytes
- Clade: Tracheophytes
- Clade: Angiosperms
- Clade: Eudicots
- Clade: Asterids
- Order: Gentianales
- Family: Rubiaceae
- Genus: Ceriscoides
- Species: C. turgida

Binomial name
- Ceriscoides turgida (Roxb.) Tirveng.

Synonyms
- Gardenia donia Buch.-Ham. ex Wall.; Gardenia montana Roxb.; Gardenia turgida Roxb.; Randia turgida (Roxb.) Tirveng.

= Ceriscoides turgida =

Species of flowering plant

Ceriscoides turgida (syn. Gardenia turgida), the mountain gardenia, is a species of flowering plant in the family Rubiaceae, native to the Indian Subcontinent and mainland Southeast Asia. A tree reaching 8 m (26 ft), its unripe fruit can be boiled and eaten as a famine food, but its ripe fruit are poisonous.
