= Brenania =

Scientific classification
- Kingdom: Plantae
- Clade: Tracheophytes
- Clade: Angiosperms
- Clade: Eudicots
- Clade: Asterids
- Order: Gentianales
- Family: Rubiaceae
- Subfamily: Ixoroideae
- Tribe: Gardenieae
- Genus: Brenania; Keay

Type species
- Brenania spathulifolia (R.D.Good) Keay

Genus of plants

Brenania is a genus of flowering plants in the family Rubiaceae. It is found from Nigeria to Cameroon, Gabon, Cabinda, Central African Republic, Congo, and D.R.Congo. The genus was described in 1958 and contained only the type species Brenania spathulifolia (now considered a synonym of B. brieyi, although per ICN B. spathulifolia retains its status as type).

== Species ==
- Brenania brieyi (De Wild.) E.M.A.Petit - Nigeria, Cabinda, Central African Republic, Cameroon, Gabon, Congo, D.R.Congo
- Brenania rhomboideifolia E.M.A.Petit - D.R.Congo
