= Calochone acuminata =

Conservation status
- Vulnerable (IUCN 3.1)

Scientific classification
- Kingdom: Plantae
- Clade: Tracheophytes
- Clade: Angiosperms
- Clade: Eudicots
- Clade: Asterids
- Order: Gentianales
- Family: Rubiaceae
- Genus: Calochone
- Species: C. acuminata

Binomial name
- Calochone acuminata Keay

Species of plant

Calochone acuminata is a species of flowering plant in the family Rubiaceae. It is found in Cabinda Province, Cameroon, and Gabon. Its natural habitat is subtropical or tropical moist lowland forests. It is threatened by habitat loss.
