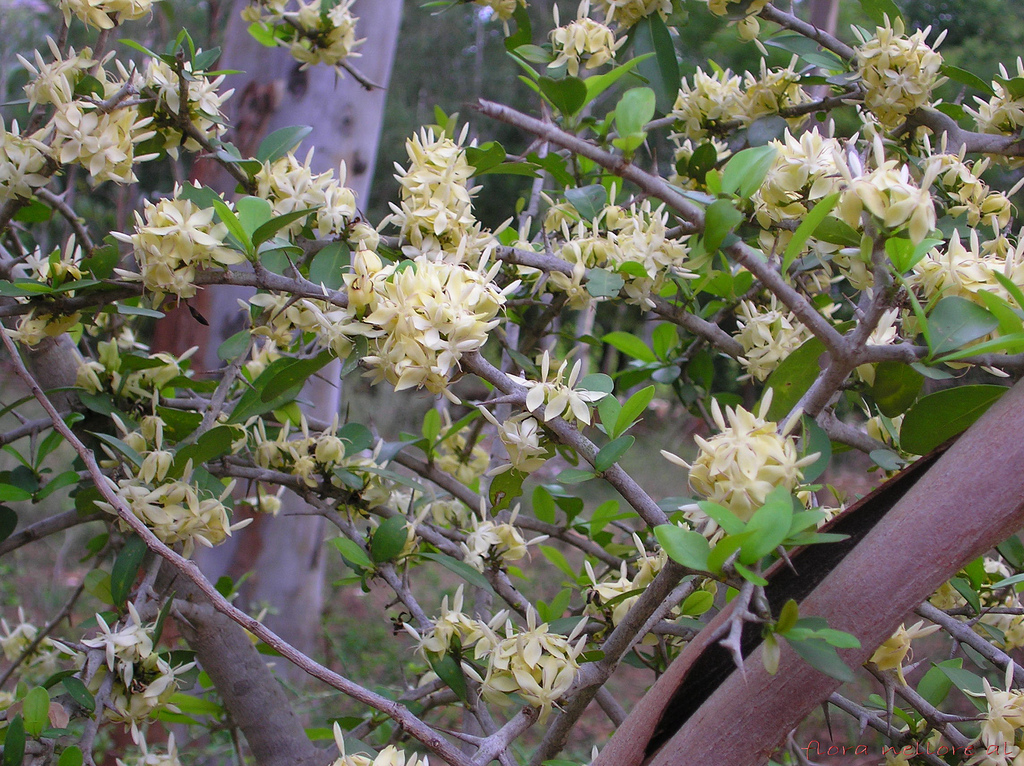
- Benkara malabarica

Scientific classification
- Kingdom: Plantae
- Clade: Tracheophytes
- Clade: Angiosperms
- Clade: Eudicots
- Clade: Asterids
- Order: Gentianales
- Family: Rubiaceae
- Subfamily: Ixoroideae
- Tribe: Gardenieae
- Genus: Benkara; Adans.

Type species
- Benkara malabarica (Lam.) Tirveng.

Synonyms
- Fagerlindia Tirveng.; Griffithia Wight & Arn.

= Benkara =

Genus of plants

Benkara is a genus of flowering plants in the family Rubiaceae. It is found in tropical and subtropical Asia from India east to China and the Ryukyu Islands, south to Java and the Philippines. It was described by Michel Adanson in 1763.

== Species ==
- Benkara armigera (K.Schum.) Ridsdale - Thailand, Cambodia, Laos, Vietnam, Peninsular Malaysia
- Benkara depauperata (Drake) Ridsdale - China, Vietnam
- Benkara emanuelssoniana (Lour.) Ridsdale - Palawan
- Benkara esculenta (Lour.) Ridsdale - Vietnam
- Benkara evenosa (Hutch.) Ridsdale - Yunnan
- Benkara fasciculata (Roxb.) Ridsdale - Assam, Bhutan, Nepal, India, Cambodia, Vietnam, Malaysia, Philippines
- Benkara forrestii (J.Anthony) Ridsdale - Yunnan, Thailand
- Benkara griffithii (Hook.f.) Ridsdale - China, Assam, Bhutan
- Benkara hoaensis (Pierre ex Pit.) Ridsdale - Vietnam
- Benkara malabarica (Lam.) Tirveng - India, Sri Lanka
- Benkara microcarpa (Bartl. ex DC.) Ridsdale - Philippines
- Benkara miquelii (Koord. & Valeton) Ridsdale - Java
- Benkara ovoidea (Pierre ex Pit.) Ridsdale - Thailand, Laos, Cambodia, Vietnam
- Benkara parviflora (King & Gamble) Ridsdale - Peninsular Malaysia
- Benkara pierrei (Pit.) Ridsdale - Thailand, Vietnam
- Benkara rectispina (Merr.) Ridsdale - Hainan
- Benkara scandens (Thunb.) Ridsdale - China, Vietnam, Philippines
- Benkara sinensis (Lour.) Ridsdale - China, Taiwan, Thailand, Vietnam, Nansei-shoto (Ryukyu Islands)
