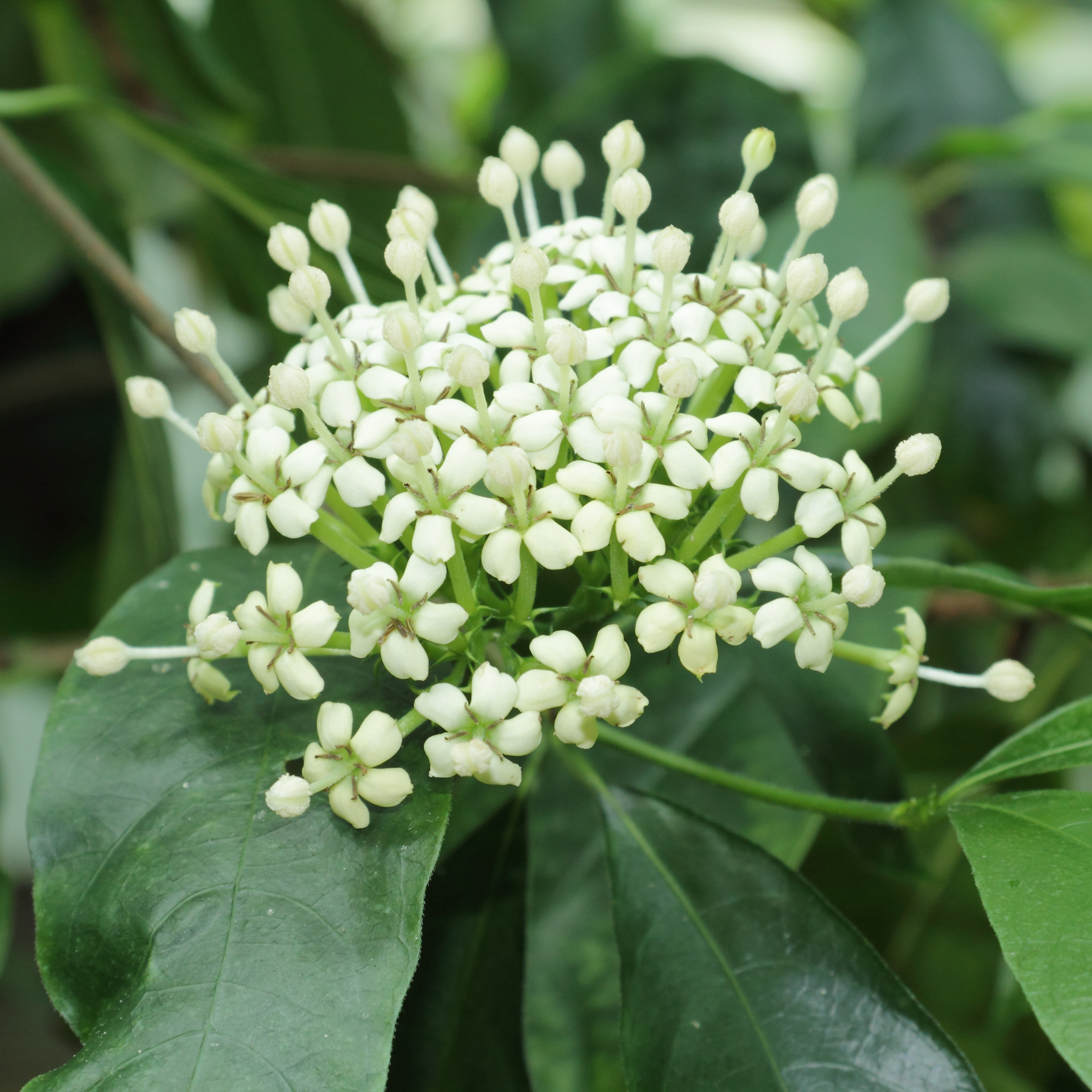
- Duperrea pavettifolia

Conservation status
- Least Concern (IUCN 3.1)

Scientific classification
- Kingdom: Plantae
- Clade: Tracheophytes
- Clade: Angiosperms
- Clade: Eudicots
- Clade: Asterids
- Order: Gentianales
- Family: Rubiaceae
- Subfamily: Ixoroideae
- Tribe: Gardenieae
- Genus: Duperrea; Pierre ex Pit.
- Species: D. pavettifolia

Binomial name
- Duperrea pavettifolia (Kurz) Pit.

Synonyms
- Ixora pavettifolia (Kurz) Craib; Mussaenda pavettifolia Kurz; Duperrea insignis Pierre ex Pit.; Duperrea pavettifolia var. kontumensis T.N.Ninh; Duperrea pavettifolia f. mollissisima H.Chu; Duperrea pavettifolia var. scabra Pit.; Duperrea scabrida Craib; Ixora debilis Drake

= Duperrea =

Genus of plants

Duperrea is a monotypic genus of flowering plants in the family Rubiaceae. The genus contains only one species, viz. Duperrea pavettifolia, which is native to Cambodia, China, Laos, Myanmar, Thailand, and Vietnam.

== Varieties ==
- Duperrea pavettifolia var. pavettifolia
- Duperrea pavettifolia var. scabra Pit.
