= Rubovietnamia =

Scientific classification
- Kingdom: Plantae
- Clade: Tracheophytes
- Clade: Angiosperms
- Clade: Eudicots
- Clade: Asterids
- Order: Gentianales
- Family: Rubiaceae
- Tribe: Gardenieae
- Genus: Rubovietnamia; Tirveng.

Type species
- Rubovietnamia aristata Tirveng.

Genus of plants

Rubovietnamia is a genus of plants in the family Rubiaceae, native to Vietnam, southern China and the Philippines.

As of August 2023, three species are recognised:

- Rubovietnamia coronula Alejandro & Meve – Philippines
- Rubovietnamia nonggangensis F.J.Mou & D.X.Zhang – China
- Rubovietnamia sericantha (W.C.Chen) Y.F.Deng, Y.H.Tong, W.B.Xu & N.H.Xia – China, Vietnam
