= Vidalasia =

Scientific classification
- Kingdom: Plantae
- Clade: Tracheophytes
- Clade: Angiosperms
- Clade: Eudicots
- Clade: Asterids
- Order: Gentianales
- Family: Rubiaceae
- Subfamily: Ixoroideae
- Tribe: Gardenieae
- Genus: Vidalasia; Tirveng.

Genus of plants

Vidalasia is a genus of flowering plants in the family Rubiaceae. The genus is found in Malaysia, Thailand, Vietnam, and the Philippines.

== Species ==
- Vidalasia fusca (Craib) Tirveng.
- Vidalasia morindifolia (Elmer) Tirveng.
- Vidalasia murina (Craib) Tirveng.) Bald
- Vidalasia pubescens (Tirveng. & Sastre) Tirveng.
- Vidalasia tonkinensis (Pit.) Tirveng.
