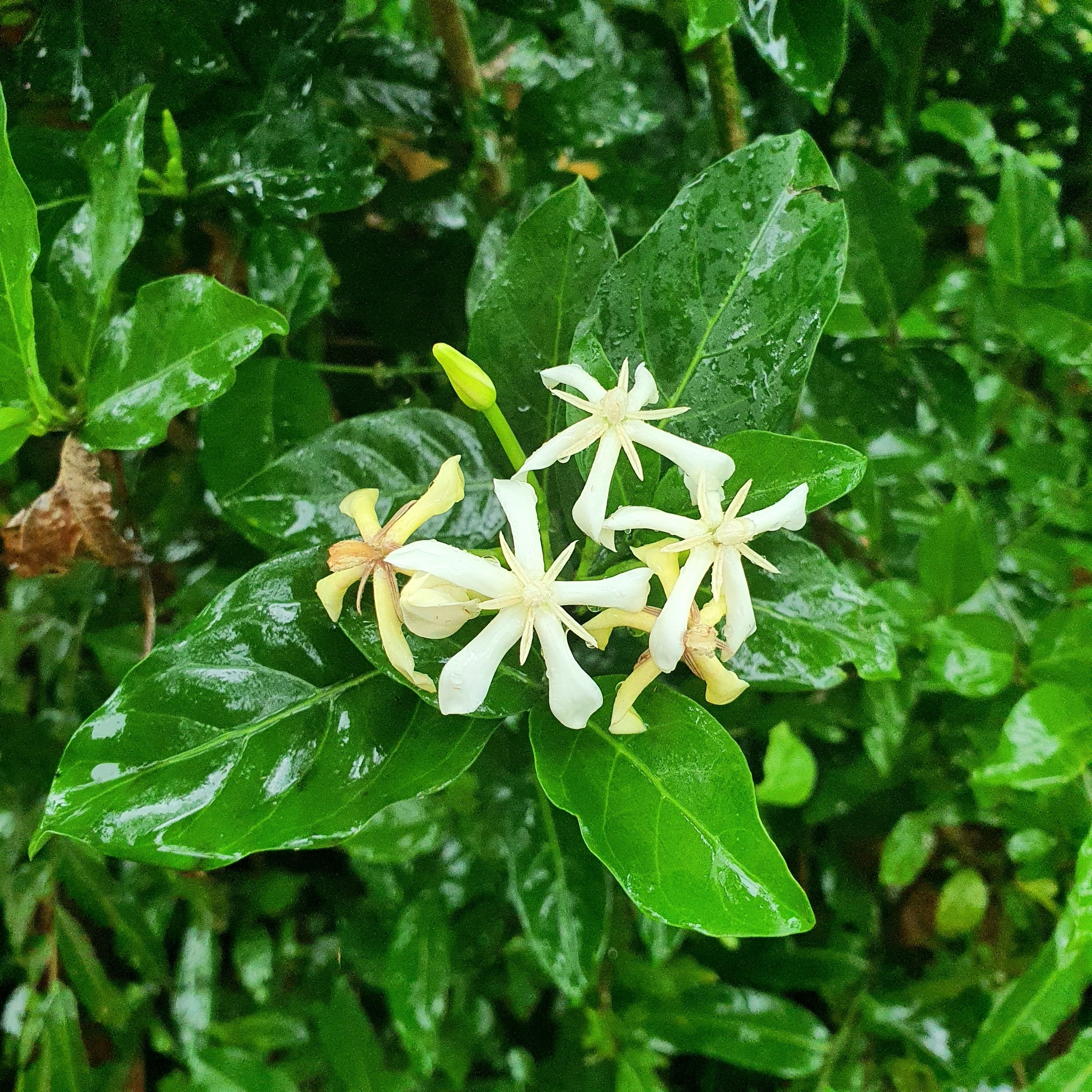

Conservation status
- Least Concern (IUCN 3.1)

Scientific classification
- Kingdom: Plantae
- Clade: Tracheophytes
- Clade: Angiosperms
- Clade: Eudicots
- Clade: Asterids
- Order: Gentianales
- Family: Rubiaceae
- Genus: Oxyceros
- Species: O. longiflorus

Binomial name
- Oxyceros longiflorus (Lam.) T.Yamaz.

Synonyms
- 26 synonyms: Gardenia longiflora (Lam.) Jacob-Makoy; Gardenia multiflora Willd.; Griffithia longiflora (Lam.) Korth.; Oxyanthus multiflorus (Blume) Hassk.; Posoqueria longiflora (Lam.) Roxb.; Posoqueria multiflora Blume; Randia longiflora Lam.; Randia multiflora (Blume) Koord. & Valeton; Solena multiflora (Blume) D.Dietr.; Webera bispinosa (Lam.) Kurz; Webera longiflora (Lam.) Kurz; Aidia oppositifolia var. floribunda (Kurz) Alam & S.N.Uddin; Canthium angulosum Wall.; Cupia scandens (Roxb.) DC.; Griffithia eucantha Korth.; Griffithia palembanica Miq.; Paederia bodinieri H.Lév.; Pseudixora javanica Miq.; Pseudixora zollingeriana Miq.; Randia angulosa Ridl.; Randia cupia Steud.; Randia euacantha (Korth.) Boerl.; Randia longiflora var. ovoidea Pit.; Solena scandens (Roxb.) D.Dietr.; Webera oppositifolia var. floribunda Kurz; Webera scandens Roxb.

= Oxyceros longiflorus =

Species of flowering plant

Oxyceros longiflorus is a species of plant in the coffee and gardenia family Rubiaceae. It is a scrambling climber native to Assam, Bangladesh, Indo-China and Malesia.

== Conservation ==
As of March 2025, this species has been assessed to be of least concern by the International Union for Conservation of Nature.
