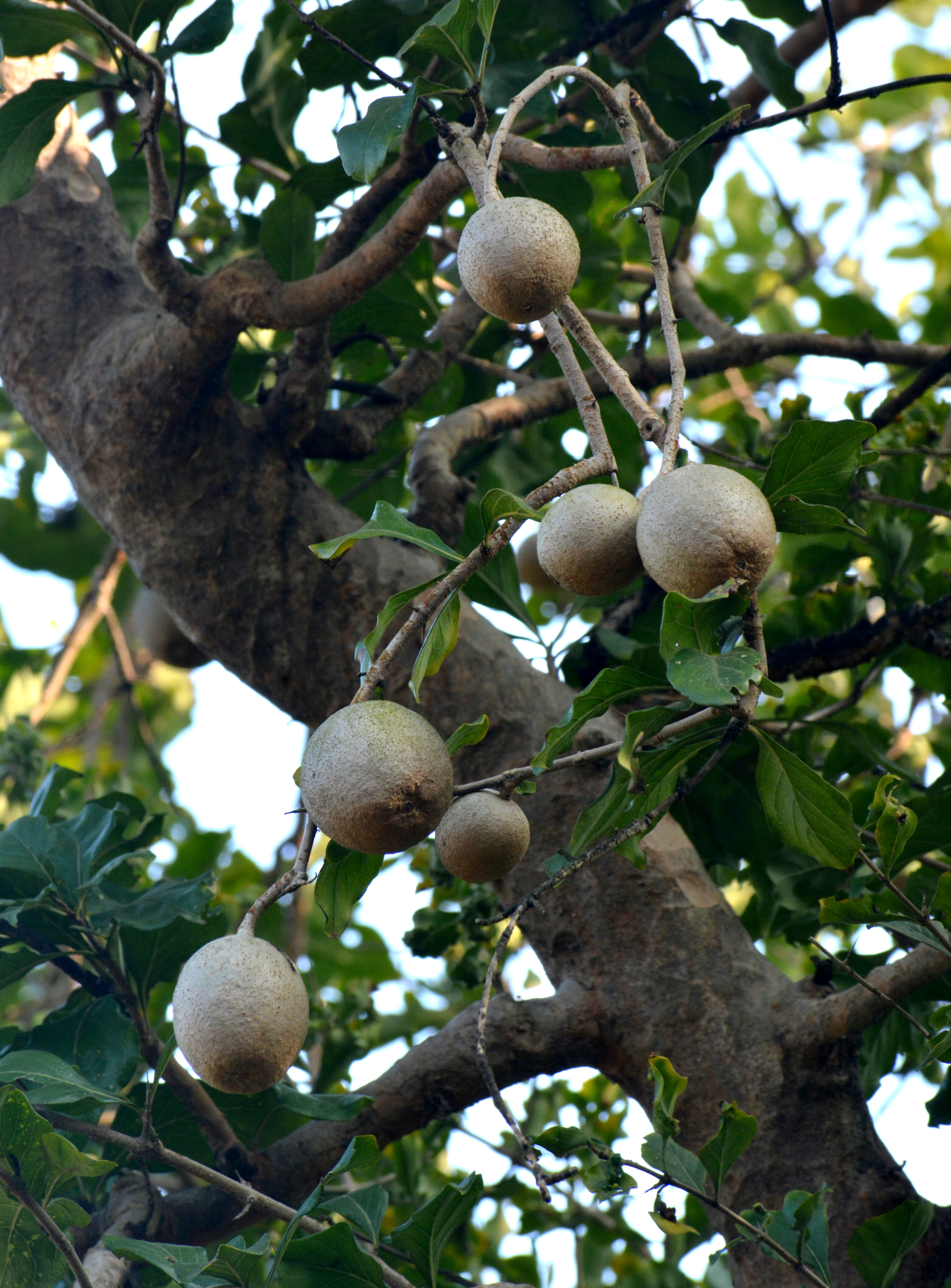
- Ceriscoides turgida

Scientific classification
- Kingdom: Plantae
- Clade: Tracheophytes
- Clade: Angiosperms
- Clade: Eudicots
- Clade: Asterids
- Order: Gentianales
- Family: Rubiaceae
- Subfamily: Ixoroideae
- Tribe: Gardenieae
- Genus: Ceriscoides (Hook.f.) Tirveng.

= Ceriscoides =

Genus of plants

Ceriscoides is a genus of flowering plants in the family Rubiaceae. The genus is found from the Hainan province to tropical Asia.

== Species ==
- Ceriscoides campanulata (Roxb.) Tirveng.
- Ceriscoides celebica Azmi
- Ceriscoides curranii (Merr.) Tirveng.
- Ceriscoides howii H.S.Lo
- Ceriscoides imbakensis Azmi
- Ceriscoides kerrii Azmi
- Ceriscoides mamillata (Craib) Tirveng.
- Ceriscoides parvifolia Azmi
- Ceriscoides perakensis (King & Gamble) K.M.Wong
- Ceriscoides sessiliflora (Wall. ex C.B.Clarcke) Tirveng.
- Ceriscoides turgida (Roxb.) Tirveng.
