= Dioecrescis =

Conservation status
- Least Concern (IUCN 3.1)

Scientific classification
- Kingdom: Plantae
- Clade: Tracheophytes
- Clade: Angiosperms
- Clade: Eudicots
- Clade: Asterids
- Order: Gentianales
- Family: Rubiaceae
- Subfamily: Ixoroideae
- Tribe: Gardenieae
- Genus: Dioecrescis; Tirveng.
- Species: D. erythroclada

Binomial name
- Dioecrescis erythroclada (Kurz) Tirveng.

Synonyms
- Gardenia erythroclada Kurz

Genus of flowering plants

Dioecrescis is a monotypic genus of flowering plants in the family Rubiaceae. The genus contains only one species, viz. Dioecrescis erythroclada, which is native to India, Bangladesh, Cambodia, Laos, Myanmar, Thailand, and Vietnam.
