= Tarennoidea =

Scientific classification
- Kingdom: Plantae
- Clade: Tracheophytes
- Clade: Angiosperms
- Clade: Eudicots
- Clade: Asterids
- Order: Gentianales
- Family: Rubiaceae
- Subfamily: Ixoroideae
- Tribe: Gardenieae
- Genus: Tarennoidea; Tirveng. & Sastre

Genus of flowering plants

Tarennoidea is a genus of flowering plants belonging to the family Rubiaceae.

Its native range is Tropical and Subtropical Asia to Northern Australia.

Species:

- Tarennoidea axillaris (Ridl.) Tirveng. & Sastre
- Tarennoidea wallichii (Hook.f.) Tirveng. & Sastre
