= Ganguelia =

Scientific classification
- Kingdom: Plantae
- Clade: Tracheophytes
- Clade: Angiosperms
- Clade: Eudicots
- Clade: Asterids
- Order: Gentianales
- Family: Rubiaceae
- Subfamily: Ixoroideae
- Tribe: Gardenieae
- Genus: Ganguelia; Robbr.
- Species: G. gossweileri

Binomial name
- Ganguelia gossweileri (S.Moore) Robbr.

Synonyms
- Oxyanthus gossweileri S.Moore

Genus of plants

Ganguelia is a monotypic genus of flowering plants in the family Rubiaceae. The genus contains only one species, viz. Ganguelia gossweileri, which is endemic to Angola. It was established when the species Oxyanthus gossweileri was transferred to a new genus in the tribe Gardenieae.
