= Aidia gardneri =

Scientific classification
- Kingdom: Plantae
- Clade: Tracheophytes
- Clade: Angiosperms
- Clade: Eudicots
- Clade: Asterids
- Order: Gentianales
- Family: Rubiaceae
- Genus: Aidia
- Species: A. gardneri

Binomial name
- Aidia gardneri (Thwaites) Tirveng.

Synonyms
- Griffithia gardneri Thwaites (1859); Randia gardneri (Thwaites) Bedd.

Species of plant

Aidia gardneri is a species of flowering plant in the family Rubiaceae. It occurs in Sri Lanka and Tamil Nadu (southern India).
