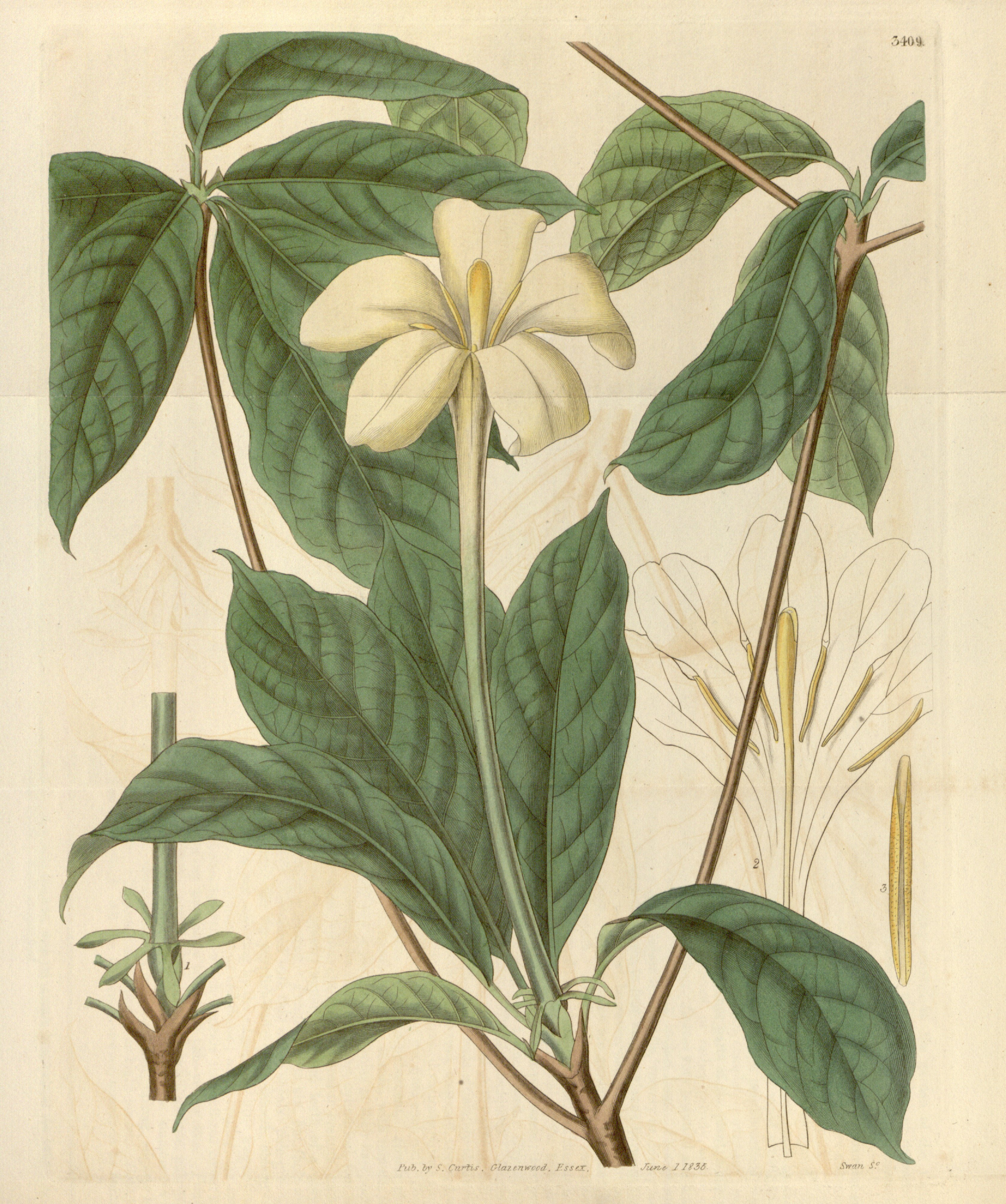
- Illustration of Euclinia longiflora

Scientific classification
- Kingdom: Plantae
- Clade: Tracheophytes
- Clade: Angiosperms
- Clade: Eudicots
- Clade: Asterids
- Order: Gentianales
- Family: Rubiaceae
- Subfamily: Ixoroideae
- Tribe: Gardenieae
- Genus: Euclinia; Salisb.

Type species
- Euclinia longiflora Salisb.

= Euclinia =

Genus of plants

Euclinia is a genus of flowering plants in the family Rubiaceae. The genus is found in tropical Africa and Madagascar.

== Species ==
- Euclinia longiflora Salisb. - tropical Africa
- Euclinia squamifera (R.D.Good) Keay - Cameroon, Gabon, Cabinda Province
- Euclinia suavissima (Homolle ex Cavaco) J.-F.Leroy - Madagascar
