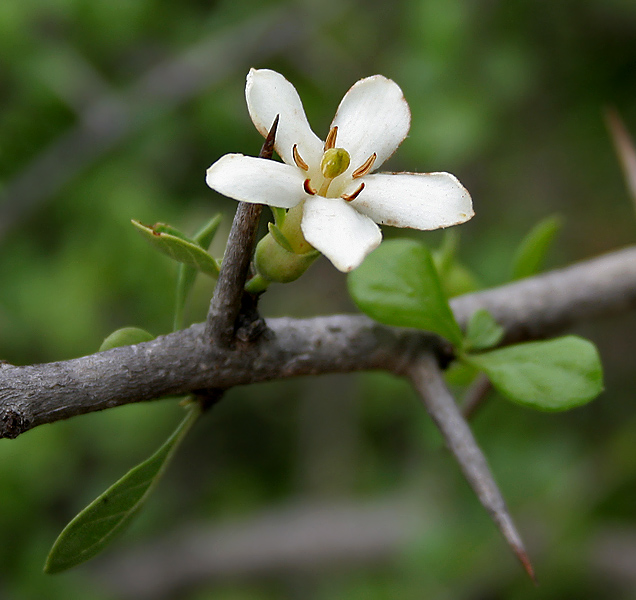

Scientific classification
- Kingdom: Plantae
- Clade: Tracheophytes
- Clade: Angiosperms
- Clade: Eudicots
- Clade: Asterids
- Order: Gentianales
- Family: Rubiaceae
- Genus: Catunaregam
- Species: C. spinosa

Binomial name
- Catunaregam spinosa Thunb., Tirveng.

Synonyms
- List: Canthium chinense Pers.; Canthium coronatum Lam.; Canthium spinosum (Thunb.) J.St.-Hil.; Catunaregam brandisii Kottaim.; Ceriscus malabaricus Gaertn.; Gardenia dumetorum Retz.; Gardenia dumosa Salisb.; Gardenia floribunda Roxb.; Gardenia glabra R.Br. ex Wall.; Gardenia latifolia Schltdl. ex Hook.f.; Gardenia spinosa L.f.; Gardenia spinosa Thunb.; Gardenia stipularis Rottler; Genipa dumetorum (Retz.) Baill.; Narega coduva Raf.; Posoqueria dumetorum (Retz.) Willd. ex Roxb.; Posoqueria floribunda Roxb.; Randia brandisii Gamble; Randia dumetorum (Retz.) Poir.; Randia floribunda (Roxb.) DC.; Randia lachnosiphonium Hochst.; Randia oxypetala Lindl.Randia rottleri Wight & Arn.; Randia spinosa (Thunb.) Poir.; Randia stipulosa Miq.; Randia tomentosa Wight & Arn.; Randia uniflora Regel; Solena dumetorum (Retz.) D.Dietr.; Solena floribunda (Roxb.) D.Dietr.; Solena longispina D.Dietr.; Solena nutans D.Dietr.; Xeromphis retzii Raf.; Xeromphis spinosa (Thunb.) Keay

= Catunaregam spinosa =

Mountain pomegranate

Species of plant

Catunaregam spinosa, the mountain pomegranate, is a flowering plant in the family Rubiaceae, found in South Asia and other Asian countries. Almost all parts of the plant are used as a traditional medicine in Ayurveda and fruits have been reported to be used in medicine as well as in food. Various flavonoids, alkaloids, tannins, lignans, terpenoids, and volatile oils have been reported from this plant. Several studies have reported the modern pharmaceutical activities of C. spinosa such as piscicidal, molluscicidal, antioxidant, anti-inflammatory, antidiabetic, and antihyperlipidemic activities

== Culture ==
- Known as "කුකුරුමාන් - kukuruman" in Sinhala,"karai"(காரை) in Tamil and "Madanphal or Mainphal" in Nepali.
- Known as "Manga/Manga Tree"(మంగ/మంగచెట్టు and పిండీతకము) in Telugu speaking regions of Andhra Pradesh and Telangana. మంగ used to be a commonly held first name for many women in this region. There were films like Mangamma Sapatham, Mangamma gari Manavaraalu, Mangamma gaari manavadu, ganga manga, and many local plays with the name మంగ given to the female protagonist.
- Known as "गेळफळ" (gelphal) or "पहील्या दिवशीचे फळ", translating as "first days flower" (as it appears white at first) and next day when it turns yellow it called "second days flower" (दुसर्या दिवशीचे फळ) in Marathi.
- The Lepcha of Sikkim call it rung gaong koong.
