= Aoranthe =

Scientific classification
- Kingdom: Plantae
- Clade: Tracheophytes
- Clade: Angiosperms
- Clade: Eudicots
- Clade: Asterids
- Order: Gentianales
- Family: Rubiaceae
- Subfamily: Ixoroideae
- Tribe: Gardenieae
- Genus: Aoranthe; Somers

Genus of plants

Aoranthe is a genus of flowering plants in the family Rubiaceae. It is found in tropical Africa.

== Species ==
- Aoranthe annulata (K.Schum.) Somers
- Aoranthe castaneofulva (S.Moore) Somers
- Aoranthe cladantha (K.Schum.) Somers
- Aoranthe nalaensis (De Wild.) Somers
- Aoranthe penduliflora (K.Schum.) Somers
