= Aidiopsis =

Scientific classification
- Kingdom: Plantae
- Clade: Tracheophytes
- Clade: Angiosperms
- Clade: Eudicots
- Clade: Asterids
- Order: Gentianales
- Family: Rubiaceae
- Subfamily: Ixoroideae
- Tribe: Gardenieae
- Genus: Aidiopsis; Tirveng.
- Species: A. orophila

Binomial name
- Aidiopsis orophila (Miq.) Ridsdale

Genus of plants

Aidiopsis is a monotypic genus of flowering plants in the family Rubiaceae. The type species was Aidiopsis forbesii but this is now considered a synonym of Aidiopsis orophila. It is native to Thailand, Malaysia, Sumatra, Java and the Andaman Islands.
