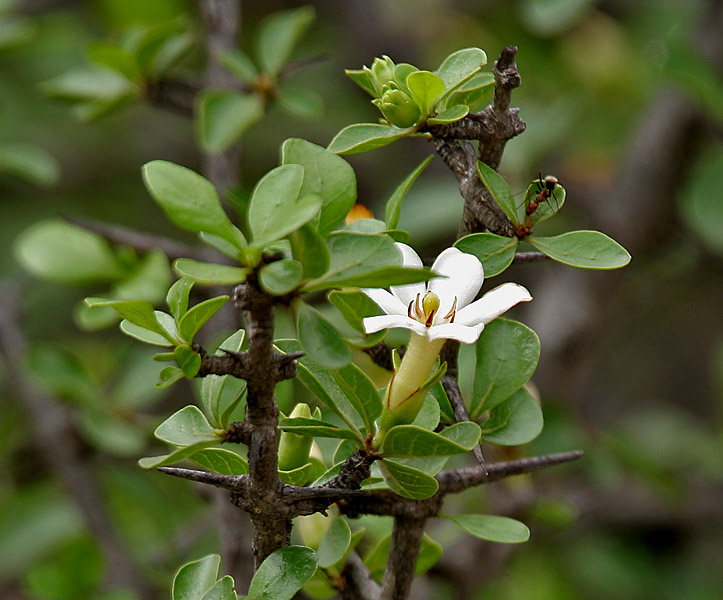
- Catunaregam spinosa (Mountain Pomegranate) flower

Scientific classification
- Kingdom: Plantae
- Clade: Tracheophytes
- Clade: Angiosperms
- Clade: Eudicots
- Clade: Asterids
- Order: Gentianales
- Family: Rubiaceae
- Subfamily: Ixoroideae
- Tribe: Gardenieae
- Genus: Catunaregam; Wolf

Type species
- Catunaregam spinosa (Thunb.) Tirveng.

Synonyms
- Canthopsis Miq.; Ceriscus Gaertn.; Lachnosiphonium Hochst.; Lepipogon G.Bertol.; Narega Raf.; Xeromphis Raf.

= Catunaregam =

Genus of plants

Catunaregam is a genus of flowering plants in the family Rubiaceae, native to tropical Africa and tropical Southeast Asia.

== Species ==
The following species are recognized in this genus:

- Catunaregam longispina (Link) Tirveng. - India, Bangladesh, Bhutan, Burma, Thailand, Vietnam
- Catunaregam nilotica (Stapf) Tirveng. - Guinea, Nigeria, Central African Republic, Cameroon, Chad, Eritrea, Ethiopia, Somalia, Sudan, Kenya, Tanzania, Uganda
- Catunaregam nutans (Roxb.) Tirveng. - India, Assam
- Catunaregam obovata (Hochst.) A.E.Gonç. - Mozambique, KwaZulu-Natal, Eswatini
- Catunaregam oocarpa (Ridl.) Tirveng. - Thailand, Malaysia, Sumatra
- Catunaregam pentandra (Gürke) Bridson - Tanzania, Malawi, Mozambique, Zimbabwe
- Catunaregam pygmaea Vollesen - Tanzania
- Catunaregam spinosa (Thunb.) Tirveng. - China, Taiwan, Bangladesh, India, Bhutan, Pakistan, Sri Lanka, Cambodia, Laos, Burma, Thailand, Vietnam, Java, Malaysia
- Catunaregam stenocarpa Bridson - Mozambique
- Catunaregam stipulosa (Zoll. & Moritzi) Deb & M.Gangop.
- Catunaregam swynnertonii (S.Moore) Bridson - Mozambique, Zimbabwe
- Catunaregam taylorii (S.Moore) Bridson - D.R.Congo, Tanzania, Malawi, Zambia, Zimbabwe, Eswatini, Transvaal
- Catunaregam tomentosa (Blume ex DC.) Tirveng.
- Catunaregam torulosa (Dennst.) Deb & M.Gangop.
