= Aoranthe penduliflora =

Conservation status
- Vulnerable (IUCN 3.1)

Scientific classification
- Kingdom: Plantae
- Clade: Tracheophytes
- Clade: Angiosperms
- Clade: Eudicots
- Clade: Asterids
- Order: Gentianales
- Family: Rubiaceae
- Genus: Aoranthe
- Species: A. penduliflora

Binomial name
- Aoranthe penduliflora (K.Schum.) Somers

Synonyms
- Amaralia penduliflora (K.Schum.) Wernham; Porterandia penduliflora (K.Schum.) Keay; Randia penduliflora K.Schum.

Species of plant

Aoranthe penduliflora is a species of flowering plant in the family Rubiaceae. It is a tree endemic to Tanzania, where it grows in the Eastern Arc Mountains (Usambara Mountains, Nguru Mountains, and Udzungwa Mountains), and the coastal Rondo Plateau. It is threatened by habitat loss caused by logging, mining, and agriculture. It grows as a tree with simple, opposite leaves. The flowers are cream and red, and the fruit ripens orange. It grows in forest patches from 200 to 960 metres elevation.

The species was first described as Randia penduliflora by Karl Moritz Schumann in 1895. In 1988 Carl Somers placed the species in genus Aoranthe as A. penduliflora.
