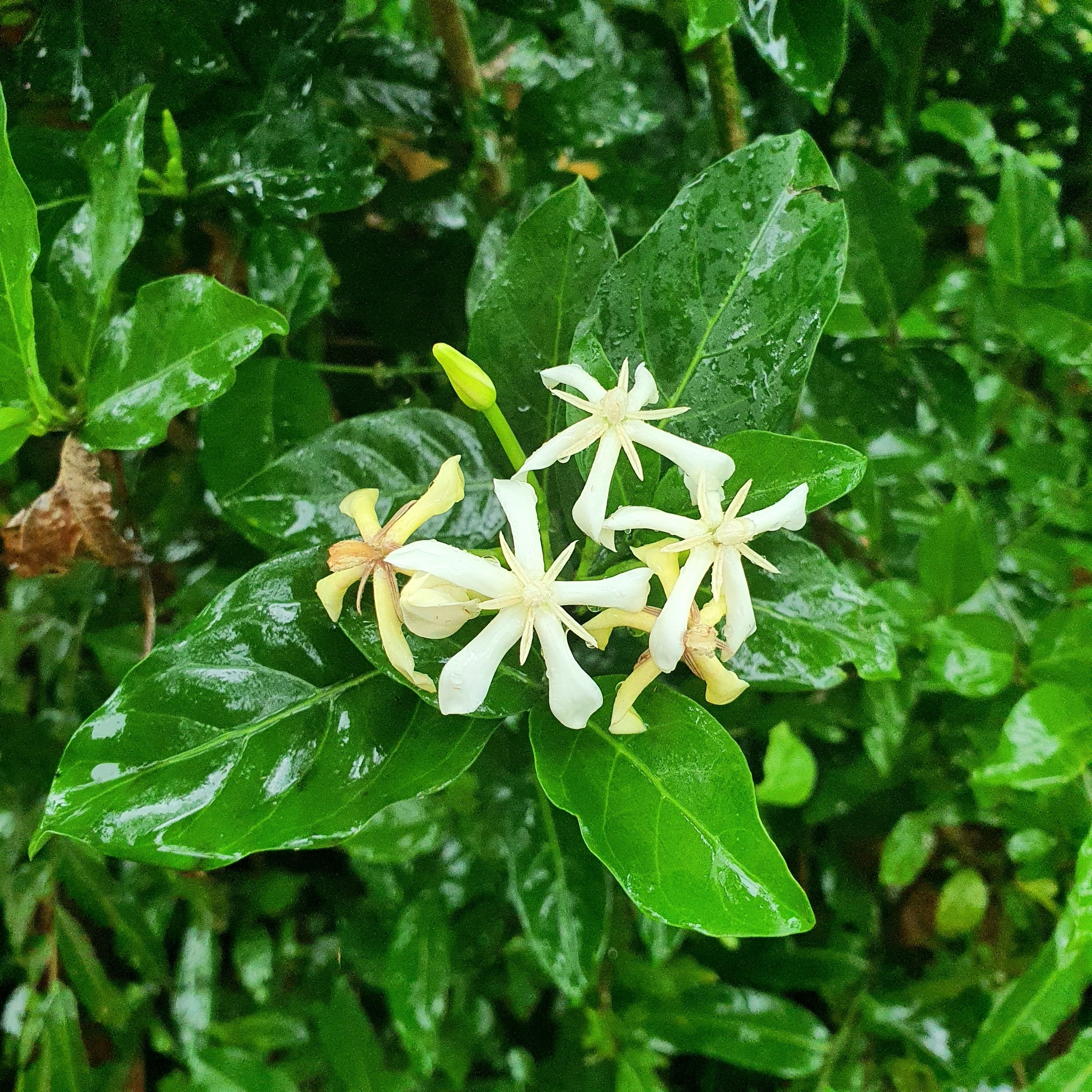
- Oxyceros longiflorus

Scientific classification
- Kingdom: Plantae
- Clade: Embryophytes
- Clade: Tracheophytes
- Clade: Angiosperms
- Clade: Eudicots
- Clade: Asterids
- Order: Gentianales
- Family: Rubiaceae
- Subfamily: Ixoroideae
- Tribe: Gardenieae
- Genus: Oxyceros; Lour.

Type species
- Oxyceros horridus Lour.

= Oxyceros =

Genus of flowering plants in the coffee family

Oxyceros is a genus of climbing flowering plants in the tribe Gardenieae of the family Rubiaceae. The native distribution of the genus is from the Indian subcontinent, through Indo China to Malesia and New Guinea.

== Species ==
As of March 2025, Plants of the World Online accepts the following 12 species:

- Oxyceros bispinosus (Griff.) Tirveng.
- Oxyceros drupaceus (C.F.Gaertn.) Ridsdale
- Oxyceros horridus Lour.
- Oxyceros jasminiflorus (S.Moore) Ridsdale
- Oxyceros kesslerianus Ridsdale
- Oxyceros kunstleri (King & Gamble) Tirveng.
- Oxyceros longiflorus (Lam.) T.Yamaz.
- Oxyceros patulus (Horsf. ex Schult.) Ridsdale
- Oxyceros penangianus (King & Gamble) Tirveng.
- Oxyceros pubicalyx K.M.Wong
- Oxyceros rugulosus (Thwaites) Tirveng.
- Oxyceros vidalii Tirveng.
