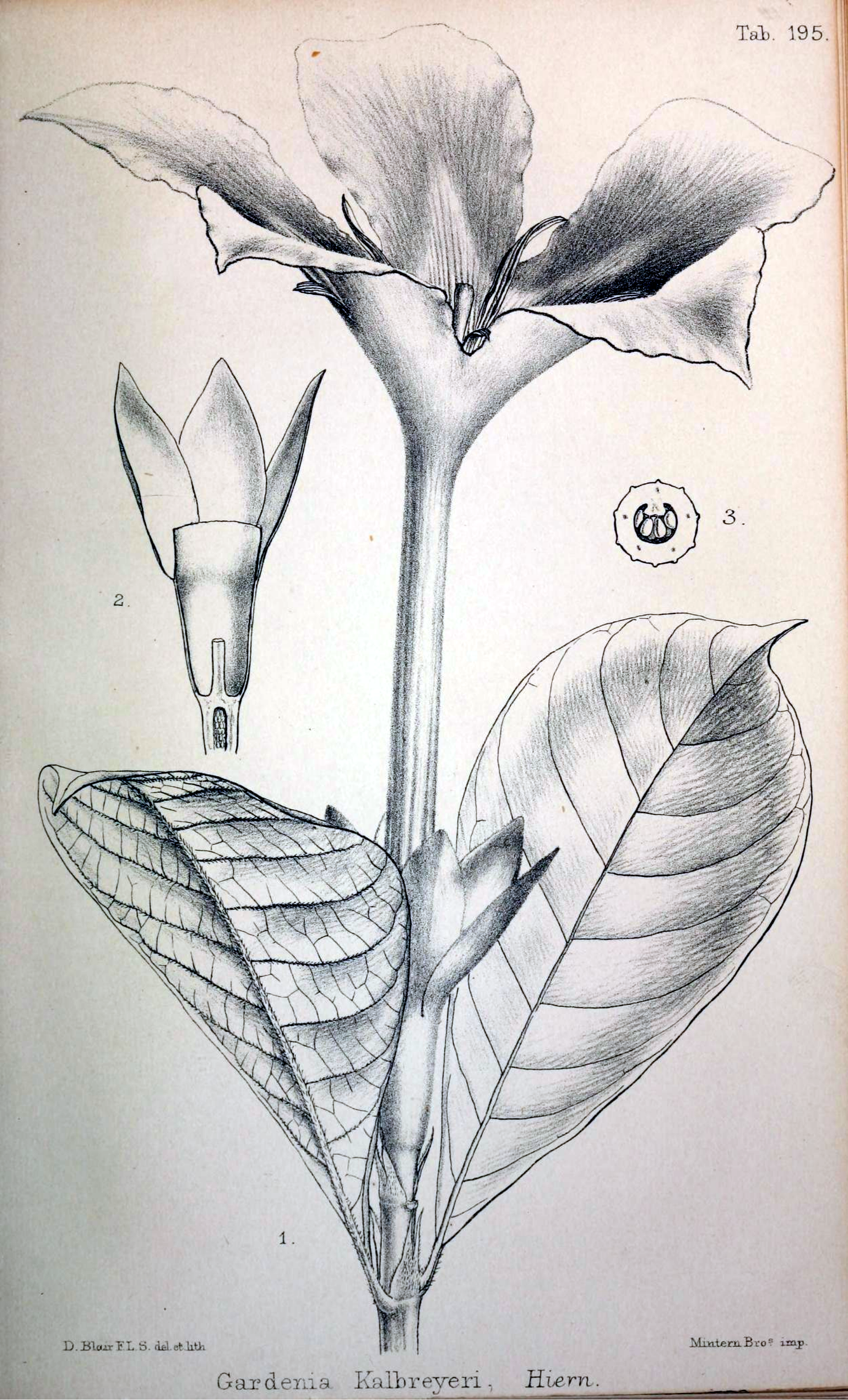

Scientific classification
- Kingdom: Plantae
- Clade: Tracheophytes
- Clade: Angiosperms
- Clade: Eudicots
- Clade: Asterids
- Order: Gentianales
- Family: Rubiaceae
- Subfamily: Ixoroideae
- Tribe: Gardenieae
- Genus: Adenorandia; Vermoesen
- Species: A. kalbreyeri

Binomial name
- Adenorandia kalbreyeri (Hiern) Robbr. & Bridson

Synonyms
- Gardenia gossleriana J.E.Br. & K.Schum.; Gardenia kalbreyeri Hiern; Pseudogardenia kalbreyeri (Hiern) Keay; Randia purpureomaculata C.H.Wright

= Adenorandia =

Genus of flowering plants

Adenorandia is a monotypic genus of flowering plants in the family Rubiaceae. It was described by Vermoesen in 1922. The genus contains only one species, viz. Adenorandia kalbreyeri, which is found from west-central tropical Africa.

== Description ==
Scandent shrub or liana with stems over 6 m long. Leaves opposite, simple and entire; stipules 4–10 mm long, usually falling off; petiole 3–12 mm long; blade obovate, 7–24 cm × 4–10 cm, base cuneate to truncate, apex acuminate, pubescent below, pinnately veined with lateral veins in 8–15 pairs. Flowers solitary, terminal on lateral branches, bisexual, regular, 5-merous, very fragrant; pedicel up to 1 cm long; calyx tubular, 2–4 cm long, widening at apex with ovate-lanceolate lobes up to 2.5 cm × 1.5 cm, densely pubescent; corolla tubular, tube 10–16 cm long, lobes ovate to lanceolate, 4–8 cm × 2–4.5 cm, white, yellowish or greenish with red-purple streaks inside, pubescent; stamens inserted in the upper part of the corolla tube, sessile, anthers up to 3 cm × 3 mm; ovary inferior, 1-celled, style with glabrous columnar basal part and pubescent ellipsoid upper part up to 3 cm × 1 cm, shortly 2-lobed at apex. Fruit a leathery, almost globose berry up to 8 cm × 6 cm, with 10–12 longitudinal grooves and more or less persistent calyx tube, many-seeded. Seeds discoid.

== Distribution and habitat ==
Adenorandia kalbreyeri is known from Ivory Coast, Nigeria, Cameroon, Gabon, Republic of the Congo, Democratic Republic of the Congo, and the Cabinda Province of Angola. It occurs in primary as well as secondary rain forest, often in forest edges, also in secondary regrowth in abandoned cultivation areas.

== Cultivation and use ==
A blue fluid is extracted from the fruit of Adenorandia kalbreyeri, which acts as a black cosmetic and as a tattoo dye. The plant has a high ornamental value as a climber with fragrant lily-like flowers.
