= Fosbergia =

Scientific classification
- Kingdom: Plantae
- Clade: Tracheophytes
- Clade: Angiosperms
- Clade: Eudicots
- Clade: Asterids
- Order: Gentianales
- Family: Rubiaceae
- Subfamily: Ixoroideae
- Tribe: Gardenieae
- Genus: Fosbergia; Tirveng. & Sastre

Genus of plants

Fosbergia is a genus of flowering plants in the family Rubiaceae. The genus is found in southern China, Thailand, and Vietnam.

== Species ==
- Fosbergia alleizettii Tirveng. & Sastre
- Fosbergia petelotii Merr. ex Tirveng. & Sastre
- Fosbergia shweliensis (J.Anthony) Tirveng. & Sastre
- Fosbergia thailandica Tirveng. & Sastre
