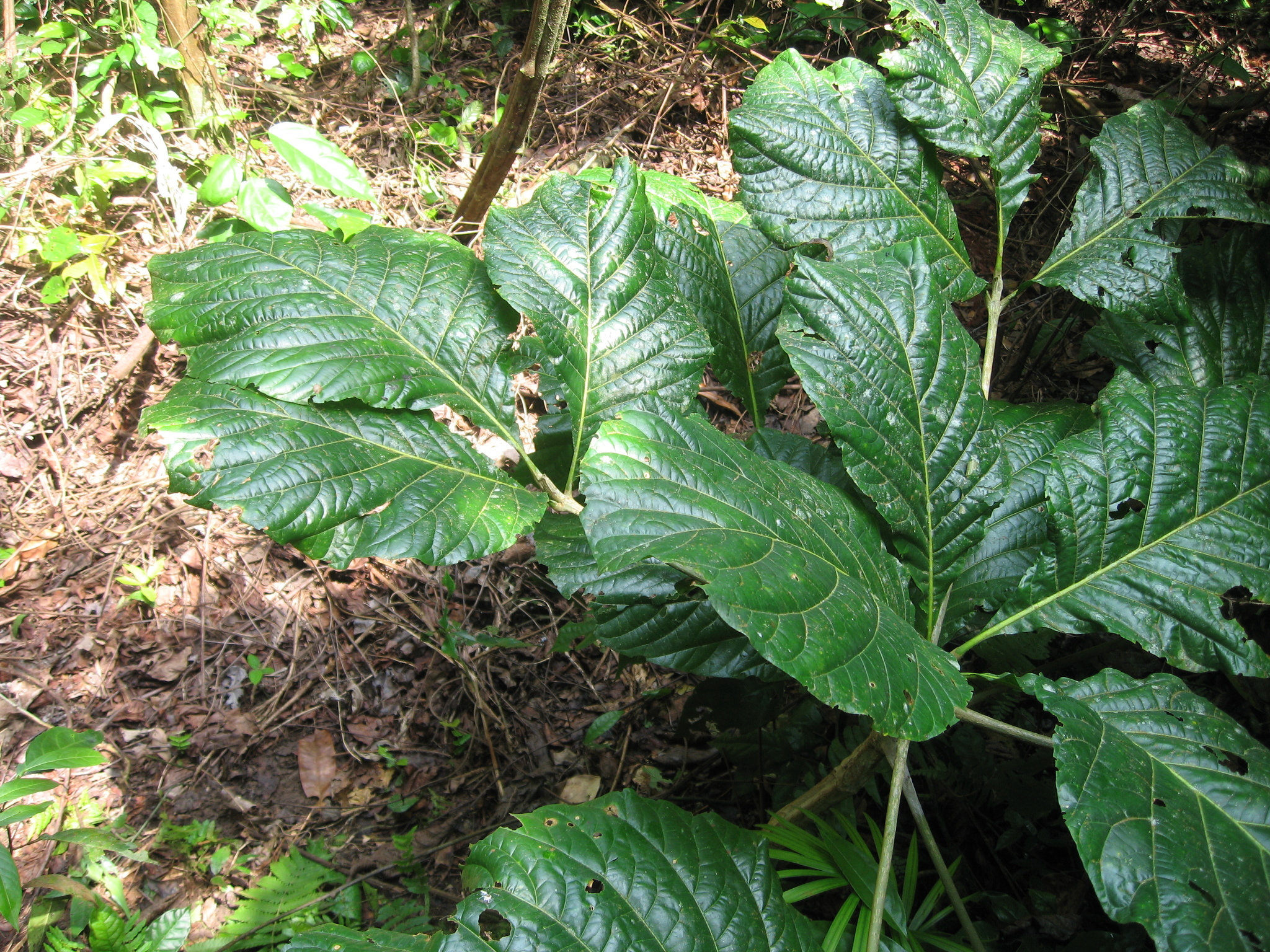
- Schumanniophyton problematicum in Ghana

Scientific classification
- Kingdom: Plantae
- Clade: Tracheophytes
- Clade: Angiosperms
- Clade: Eudicots
- Clade: Asterids
- Order: Gentianales
- Family: Rubiaceae
- Tribe: Gardenieae
- Genus: Schumanniophyton

= Schumanniophyton =

Genus of plants

Schumanniophyton is a genus of three species of small tree native to west Africa and belonging to the family Rubiaceae. It contains the following species and varieties:

- Schumanniophyton hirsutum (Hiern) R.D.Good, native from W. Central Tropical Africa to N. Angola.
- Schumanniophyton magnificum (K.Schum.) Harms Forest shrub or small tree, 12–16 ft. high, having soft-wooded stems bearing very large leaves. Flowers white or yellow, in a dense cluster subtended by broad bracts and borne at ends of shoots opposite a single leaf and just above a pair of leaves. Native from Nigeria to N. Angola.
- Schumanniophyton magnificum var. klaineanum (Perre ex A.Chev.) N.Hallé, native to Gabon.
- Schumanniophyton magnificum var. trimerum (R.D.Good) N.Hallé, native to W. Central Tropical Africa.
- Schumanniophyton problematicum, (A.Chev.) Aubrev. Forest tree 20–40 ft. high, having large deciduous leaves grouped in threes at the ends of the branches. Flowers yellowish-white, fragrant. Native from Liberia to Ghana.

== Taxonomy ==
The genus was described by Hermann Harms and published in Die Natürlichen Pflanzenfamilien by Adolf Engler and Karl Anton Eugen Prantl 1: 313 in the year 1897. It is named in honour of German botanist Karl Moritz Schumann (17 June 1851 in Görlitz – 22 March 1904 in Berlin) who served as curator of the Botanisches Museum in Berlin-Dahlem from 1880 until 1894 and also as the first chairman of the Deutsche Kakteen-Gesellschaft (German Cactus Society) which he founded on November 6, 1892.

== Uses in traditional medicine ==
S. magnificum: The bark decoction is used as an enema to treat dysentery and also as a lotion after circumcision having either antiseptic or analgesic properties. The juice of the fresh leaves and extracts prepared from the stem are used in the treatment of snakebite.

== Possible entheogen ==
In a paper on the genus Mostuea (Gelsemiaceae) French botanist, taxonomist and explorer Auguste Chevalier (1873–1956) quotes the Catholic priest and renowned authority on Gabonese language and culture, Father André Raponda-Walker (1871–1968) as placing an unnamed Gabonese species of Schumanniophyton in the same class of sleep-dispelling, aphrodisiac and hallucinogenic plants as Tabernanthe iboga (Apocynaceae) and Mostuea batesii (syn. M. stimulans). The passage runs as follows:

"This root" [that of Mostuea batesii] (writes Father Walker) "is considered to possess an action comparable to those of Tabernanthe iboga and Schumanniophyton. It is a potent aphrodisiac and also a stimulant. During nights set aside for dancing, the Blacks chew the roots, whole or grated, to drive away sleep. But the majority consume them during their dances - either on their own or mixed with Iboga - for the sexual excitement which they cause. Excessive use of this drug can lead to cerebral troubles". [translated from the French of Auguste Chevalier]

The aqueous extract of Schumanniophyton magnificum demonstrated aphrodisiac effects in an in vivo study. Specifically, the extract significantly increased mount, ejaculation, and intromission frequencies in male rats compared to a control group. It also significantly doubled serum testosterone levels (2.15 ± 0.70 ng/ml). UHPLC/MS analysis of the extract identified seven major compounds, including Schumanniofioside A, Noreugenin, and Rohitukine, which possess antioxidant and antibacterial properties. Additionally, the extract significantly increased penile nitric oxide levels (P < 0.05). These effects were comparable to those observed with sildenafil citrate, suggesting S. magnificum extract may be a potential alternative for managing erectile dysfunction. This study provides the first scientific investigation into the folkloric use of S. magnificum as an aphrodisiac by the "Baka" Pygmies of Cameroon.

== Chemistry ==
Analyses of Schumanniophyton magnificum have yielded a variety of chromone alkaloids, including schummaniophytine, isoschummaniophytine, N-methyl schummaniophytine, schumaginine, and schumannificine, as well as the related bases trigonelline, rohitukine, and the chromone noreugenin. The n-butanol extract of the root bark of the Cameroonian species has also been shown to contain new chromone glycosides and schummaniofioside A and B.
