= Brachytome =

Scientific classification
- Kingdom: Plantae
- Clade: Tracheophytes
- Clade: Angiosperms
- Clade: Eudicots
- Clade: Asterids
- Order: Gentianales
- Family: Rubiaceae
- Subfamily: Ixoroideae
- Tribe: Gardenieae
- Genus: Brachytome; Hook.f.

Type species
- Brachytome wallichii Hook.f.

Genus of plants

Brachytome is a genus of 8 species of flowering plants in the family Rubiaceae. It was described by Joseph Dalton Hooker in 1871. It occurs in mainland Southeast Asia from Bangladesh, east to south central China and south to Peninsular Malaysia.

== Species ==
- Brachytome hainanensis C.Y.Wu ex W.C.Chen - Hainan, Vietnam
- Brachytome hirtella Hu - Tibet, Yunnan, Vietnam
- Brachytome kachinensis Govaerts - Myanmar (Burma)
- Brachytome pitardii Tirveng. - Vietnam
- Brachytome russellii Deb & M.G.Gangop. - Myanmar (Burma)
- Brachytome scortechinii King & Gamble - Laos, Thailand, Malaysia
- Brachytome wallichiii Hook.f. - Yunnan, Assam, Bangladesh, Cambodia, Burma, Vietnam
- Brachytome wardii C.E.C.Fisch. - Myanmar (Burma)
