= Byrsophyllum tetrandrum =

Conservation status
- Endangered (IUCN 2.3)

Scientific classification
- Kingdom: Plantae
- Clade: Tracheophytes
- Clade: Angiosperms
- Clade: Eudicots
- Clade: Asterids
- Order: Gentianales
- Family: Rubiaceae
- Genus: Byrsophyllum
- Species: B. tetrandrum

Binomial name
- Byrsophyllum tetrandrum (Bedd.) Bedd.

Synonyms
- Gardenia tetrandra Bedd.

Species of plant

Byrsophyllum tetrandrum is a species of flowering plant in the family Rubiaceae. It is a small tree native to Agastyamalai in the Western Ghats of Kerala and Tamil Nadu in southern India, where it grows in submontane forest. Its habitat has been damaged from exposure to fires, animal grazing, commercial agriculture and deforestation.

The species was first described as Gardenia tetrandra by Richard Henry Beddome in 1868. In 1874 Beddome placed the species in genus Byrsophyllum as B. tetrandrum.
