= Tocoyena pittieri =

Conservation status
- Vulnerable (IUCN 2.3)

Scientific classification
- Kingdom: Plantae
- Clade: Tracheophytes
- Clade: Angiosperms
- Clade: Eudicots
- Clade: Asterids
- Order: Gentianales
- Family: Rubiaceae
- Genus: Tocoyena
- Species: T. pittieri

Binomial name
- Tocoyena pittieri (Standl.) Standl.

Species of plant

Tocoyena pittieri is a species of plant in the family Rubiaceae. It is found in Colombia, Costa Rica, Honduras, and Panama.
