= Calochone =

Scientific classification
- Kingdom: Plantae
- Clade: Tracheophytes
- Clade: Angiosperms
- Clade: Eudicots
- Clade: Asterids
- Order: Gentianales
- Family: Rubiaceae
- Subfamily: Ixoroideae
- Tribe: Gardenieae
- Genus: Calochone; Keay

Genus of plants

Calochone is a genus of flowering plants in the family Rubiaceae. The genus is found in Cameroon, Gabon, Cabinda Province, Republic of the Congo, and Democratic Republic of the Congo.

== Species ==
- Calochone acuminata Keay - Cabinda, Cameroon, Gabon
- Calochone redingii (De Wild.) Keay - Gabon, Cabinda Province, Republic of the Congo, and Democratic Republic of the Congo
