= Gardeniopsis =

Scientific classification
- Kingdom: Plantae
- Clade: Tracheophytes
- Clade: Angiosperms
- Clade: Eudicots
- Clade: Asterids
- Order: Gentianales
- Family: Rubiaceae
- Subfamily: Ixoroideae
- Genus: Gardeniopsis; Miq.
- Species: G. longifolia

Binomial name
- Gardeniopsis longifolia Miq.

Genus of plants

Gardeniopsis is a monotypic genus of flowering plants in the family Rubiaceae. The genus contains only one species, viz. Gardeniopsis longifolia, which is found in Thailand, Borneo, Malaysia, and Sumatra.
