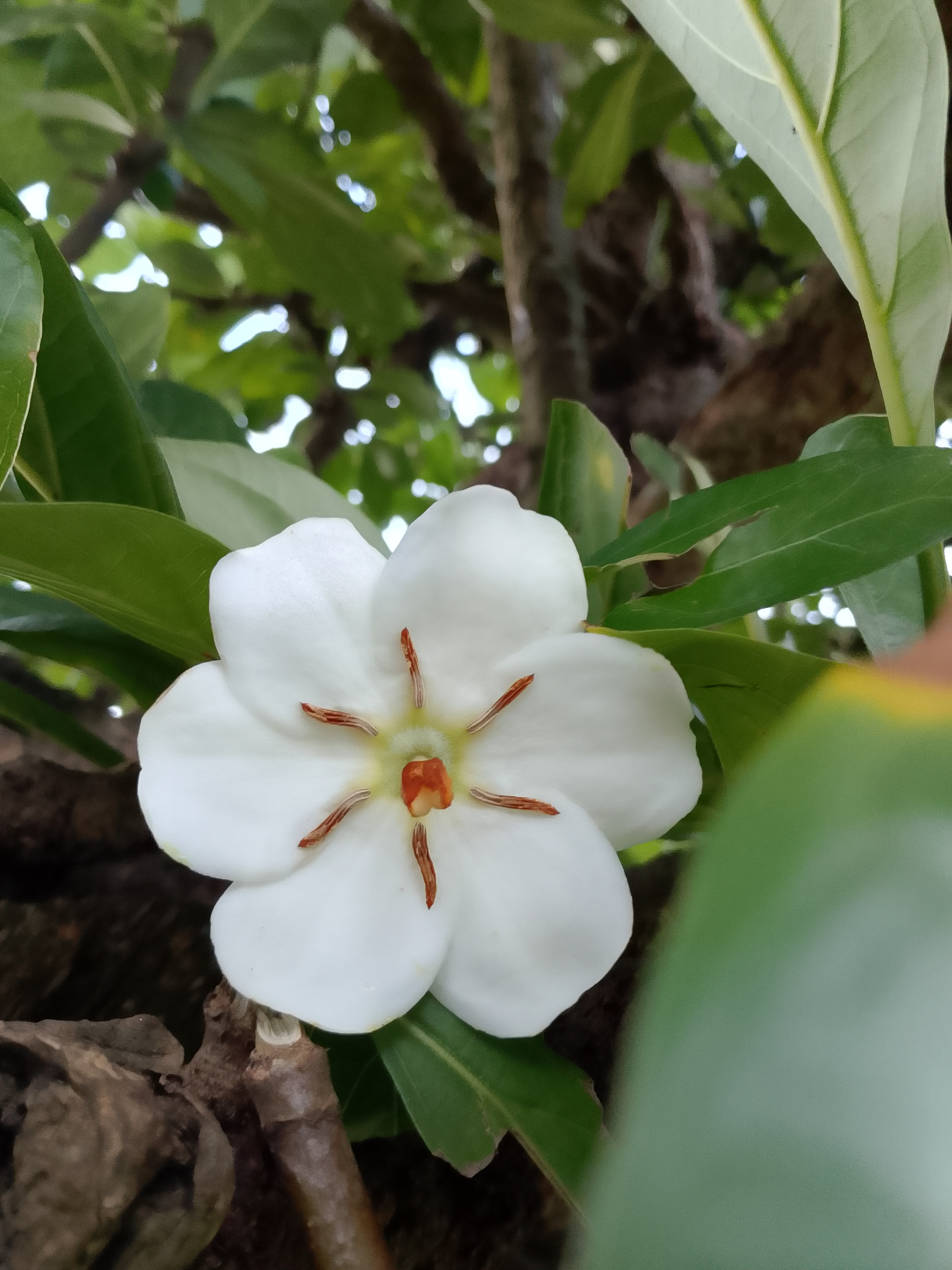
- A flower of Tamilnadia uliginosa

Scientific classification
- Kingdom: Plantae
- Clade: Tracheophytes
- Clade: Angiosperms
- Clade: Eudicots
- Clade: Asterids
- Order: Gentianales
- Family: Rubiaceae
- Genus: Tamilnadia; Tirveng. & Sastre

= Tamilnadia =

Genus of plants

Tamilnadia is a genus of flowering plants belonging to the family Rubiaceae.

Its native range is Indian subcontinent to Indo-China.

Species:

- Tamilnadia uliginosa (Retz.) Tirveng. & Sastre
