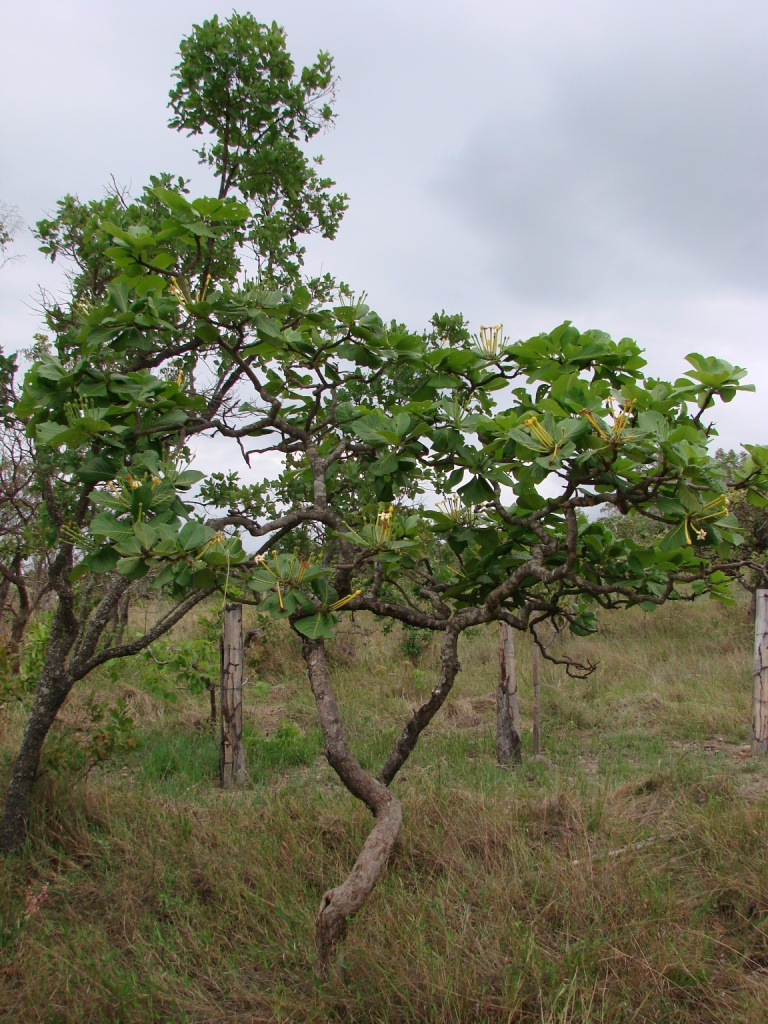
- Tocoyena formosa

Scientific classification
- Kingdom: Plantae
- Clade: Tracheophytes
- Clade: Angiosperms
- Clade: Eudicots
- Clade: Asterids
- Order: Gentianales
- Family: Rubiaceae
- Tribe: Gardenieae
- Genus: Tocoyena; Aubl.

Species
- Around 25, see text

= Tocoyena =

Genus of plants

Tocoyena is a genus of plant in the family Rubiaceae.

== Species ==
Tocoyena contains the following species (incomplete list):

- Tocoyena atlantica R. Borges & Gaem
- Tocoyena brasiliensis Mart.
- Tocoyena bullata (Vell.) Mart.
- Tocoyena foetida Poepp. & Endl.
- Tocoyena formosa (Cham. & Schltdl.) K. Schum.
- Tocoyena guyanensis K. Schum.
- Tocoyena pittieri (Standl.) Standl.
- Tocoyena selloana Schum.
- Tocoyena sellowiana (Cham. & Schltdl.) K. Schum.
