= Pseudaidia =

Scientific classification
- Kingdom: Plantae
- Clade: Tracheophytes
- Clade: Angiosperms
- Clade: Eudicots
- Clade: Asterids
- Order: Gentianales
- Family: Rubiaceae
- Genus: Pseudaidia; Tirveng.

Genus of plants

Pseudaidia is a genus of flowering plants belonging to the family Rubiaceae.

Its native range is India, Sri Lanka.

Species:

- Pseudaidia speciosa (Bedd.) Tirveng.
