= Porterandia =

Scientific classification
- Kingdom: Plantae
- Clade: Tracheophytes
- Clade: Angiosperms
- Clade: Eudicots
- Clade: Asterids
- Order: Gentianales
- Family: Rubiaceae
- Subfamily: Ixoroideae
- Tribe: Gardenieae
- Genus: Porterandia; Ridl.

Genus of flowering plants in the coffee family

Porterandia is a genus of flowering plants in the tribe Gardenieae of the family Rubiaceae native to Asia. Borneo is the centre of diversity, hosting 19 native species.
