= Oligocodon =

Scientific classification
- Kingdom: Plantae
- Clade: Tracheophytes
- Clade: Angiosperms
- Clade: Eudicots
- Clade: Asterids
- Order: Gentianales
- Family: Rubiaceae
- Genus: Oligocodon; Keay

Genus of plants

Oligocodon is a genus of flowering plants belonging to the family Rubiaceae.

Its native range is Benin to Central Congo.

== Species ==
Species:

- Oligocodon cunliffeae (Wernham) Keay
