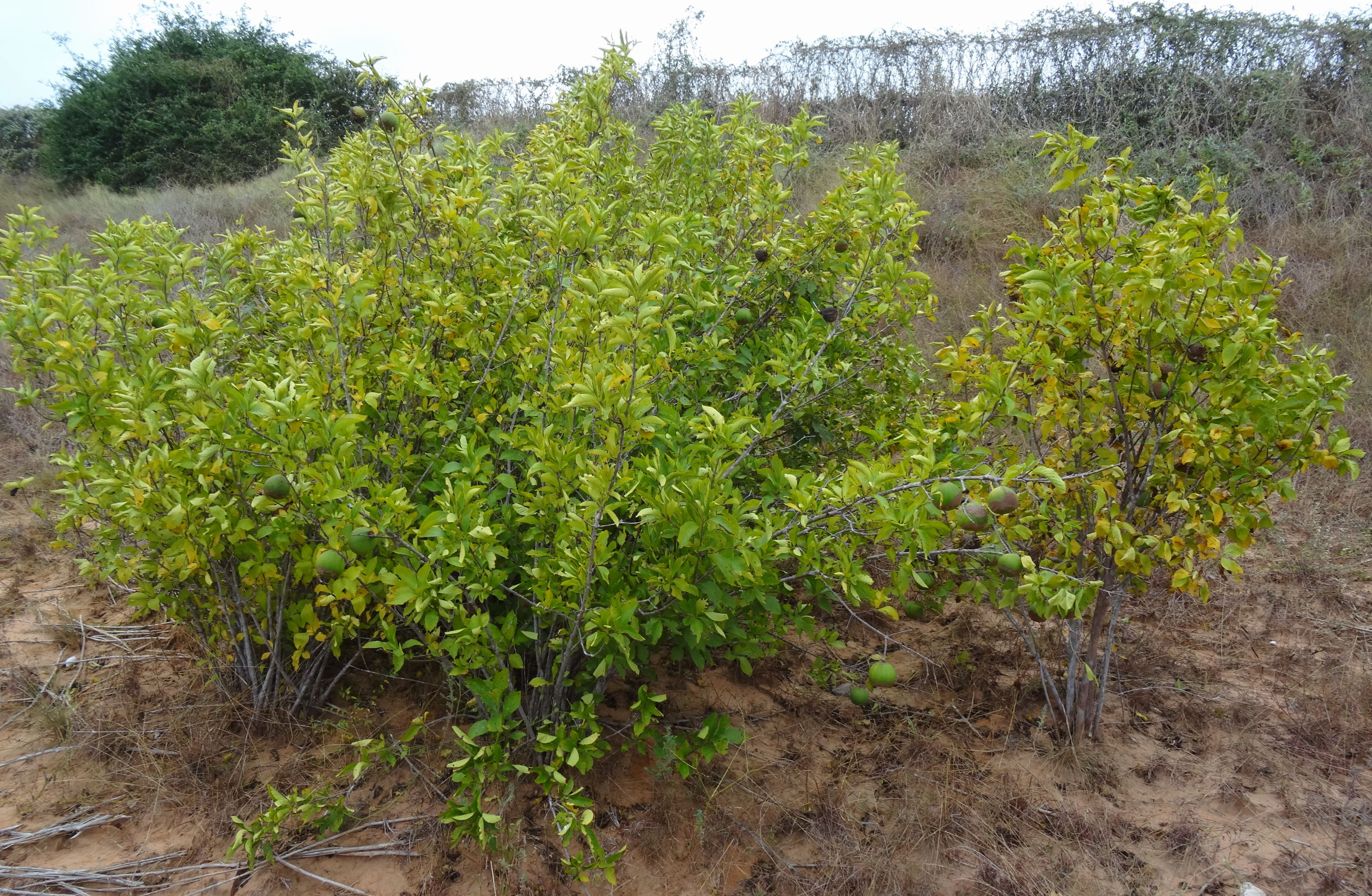
- Phellocalyx volleseni in Pemba, Mozambique

Scientific classification
- Kingdom: Plantae
- Clade: Embryophytes
- Clade: Tracheophytes
- Clade: Spermatophytes
- Clade: Angiosperms
- Clade: Eudicots
- Clade: Asterids
- Order: Gentianales
- Family: Rubiaceae
- Genus: Phellocalyx; Bridson

= Phellocalyx =

Genus of plants

Phellocalyx is a genus of flowering plants belonging to the family Rubiaceae.

Its native range is Tanzania to Mozambique.

== Species ==
Species:

- Phellocalyx vollesenii Bridson
