= Massularia =

Scientific classification
- Kingdom: Plantae
- Clade: Tracheophytes
- Clade: Angiosperms
- Clade: Eudicots
- Clade: Asterids
- Order: Gentianales
- Family: Rubiaceae
- Genus: Massularia (K.Schum.) Hoyle

Genus of plants

Massularia is a genus of flowering plants belonging to the family Rubiaceae.

Its native range is Western and Western Central Tropical Africa.

== Species ==
Species:

- Massularia acuminata (G.Don) Bullock ex Hoyle
- Massularia stevartiana Sonké, E.Bidault & Droissart
