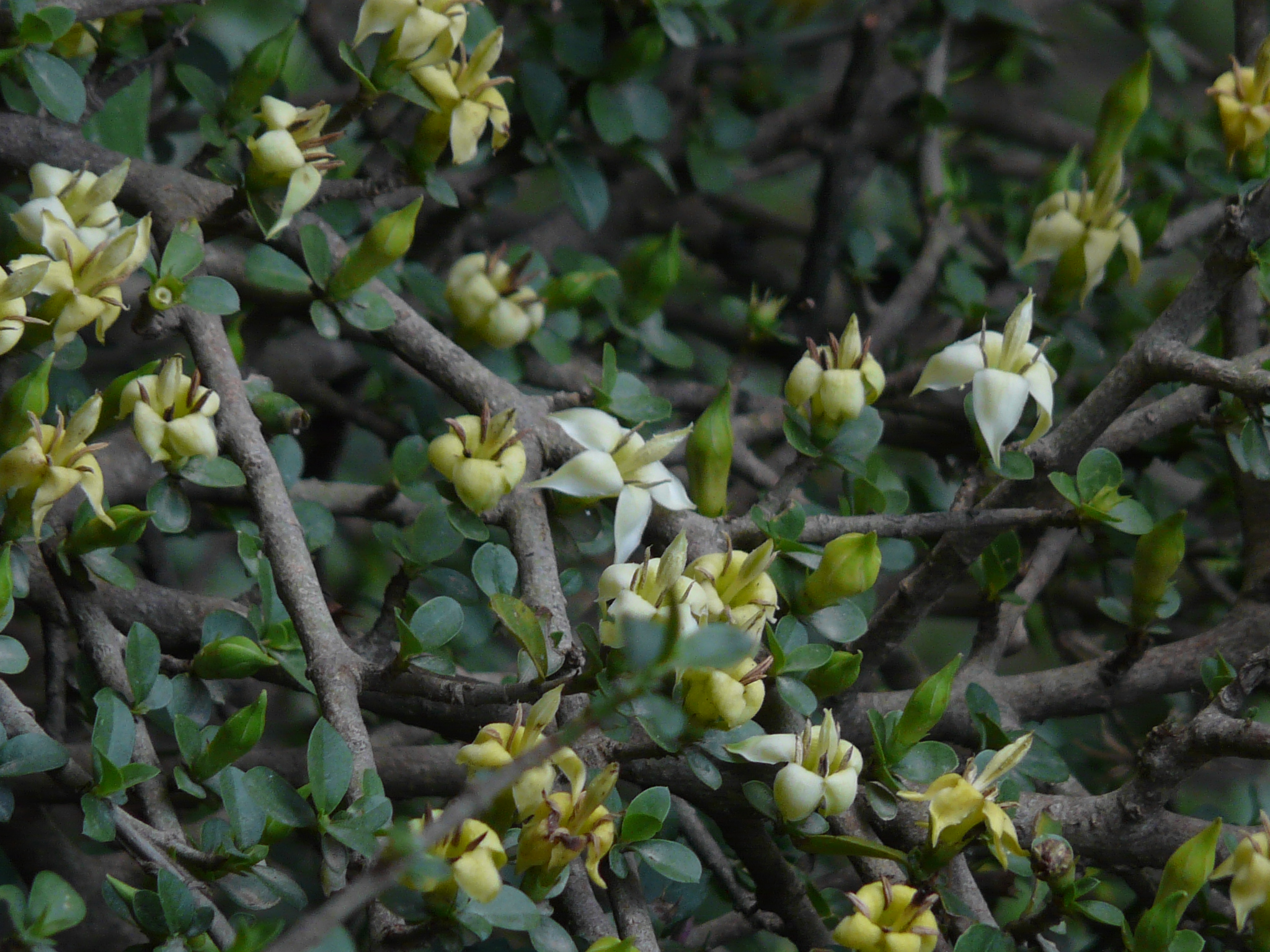
- Himalrandia tetrasperma

Scientific classification
- Kingdom: Plantae
- Clade: Tracheophytes
- Clade: Angiosperms
- Clade: Eudicots
- Clade: Asterids
- Order: Gentianales
- Family: Rubiaceae
- Genus: Himalrandia; T.Yamaz.

= Himalrandia =

Genus of plants

Himalrandia is a genus of flowering plants belonging to the family Rubiaceae.

Its native range is Easterb Afghanistan to Southern Central China.

Species:

- Himalrandia lichiangensis (W.W.Sm.) Tirveng.
- Himalrandia tetrasperma (Wall. ex Roxb.) T.Yamaz.
