= Morelia senegalensis =

Scientific classification
- Kingdom: Plantae
- Clade: Tracheophytes
- Clade: Angiosperms
- Clade: Eudicots
- Clade: Asterids
- Order: Gentianales
- Family: Rubiaceae
- Genus: Morelia; A.Rich. ex DC. (1830)
- Species: M. senegalensis

Binomial name
- Morelia senegalensis A.Rich. ex DC. (1830)

Synonyms
- Lamprothamnus fosteri Hutch. (1907)

Species of flowering plant

Morelia senegalensis is a species of flowering plant in the family Rubiaceae. It is the sole species in genus Morelia. It is a shrub or tree native to western and central tropical Africa, ranging from Senegal to South Sudan and the Democratic Republic of the Congo.
