= Mostrenco =

Mostrenco is a word deriving from the Spanish language, most famous as an origin of the English term "mustang". It can refer to:

== Places ==
- Mostrenco, Panama
- El Mostrenco, Venezuela

== Organisms ==
- Mostrenco cattle
- Algarrobo, bayahonda and mesquite trees (Prosopis species) in the Fabaceae
- An indigoberry (Randia armata) in the Rubiaceae

== Other ==
It is also a Spanish slang term denoting a homeless person or a drifter, or someone considered unintelligent or daft. The former meaning, in combination with the related mestengo ("ownerless"), gave rise to the term "mustang".
