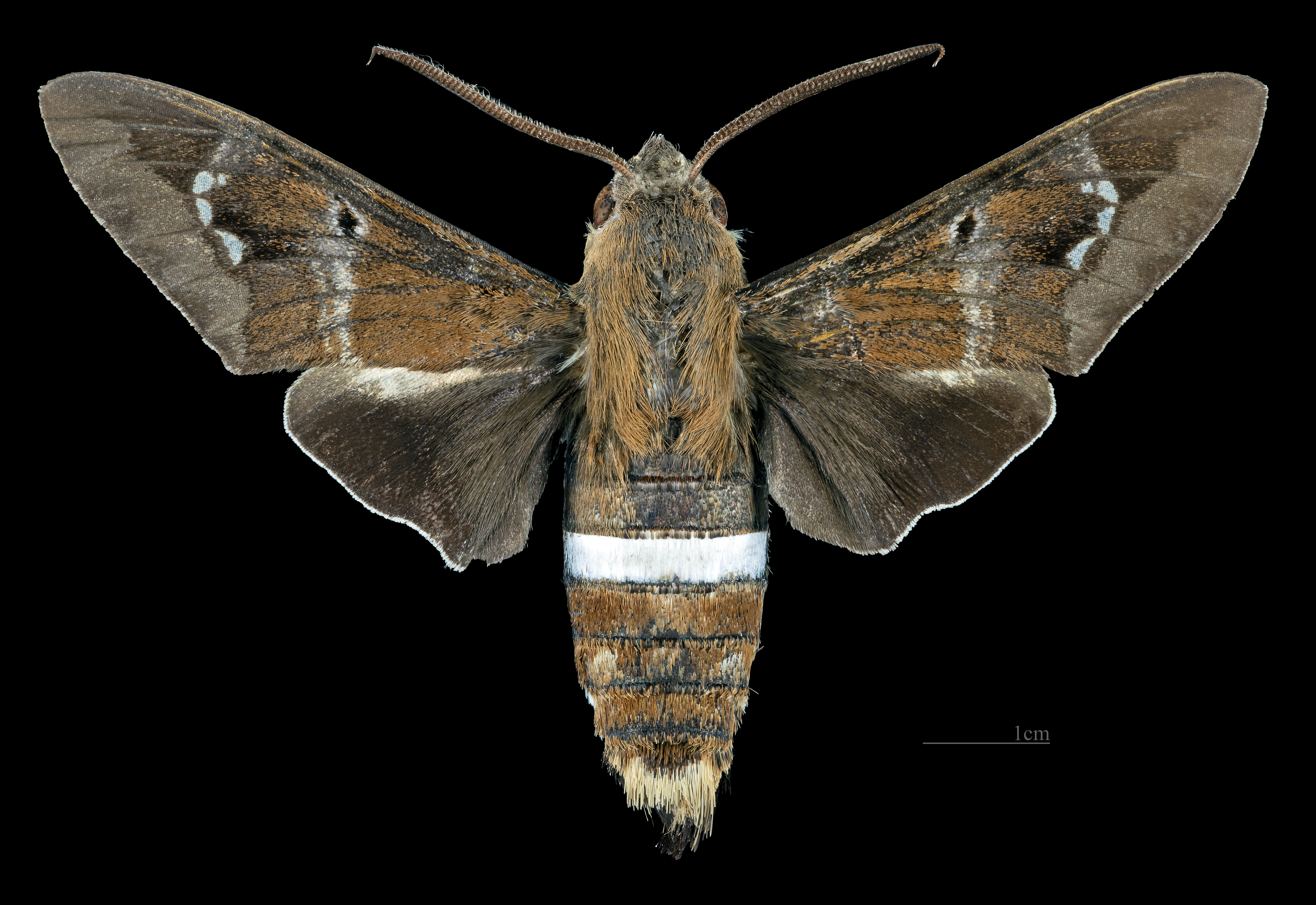
- Male dorsal
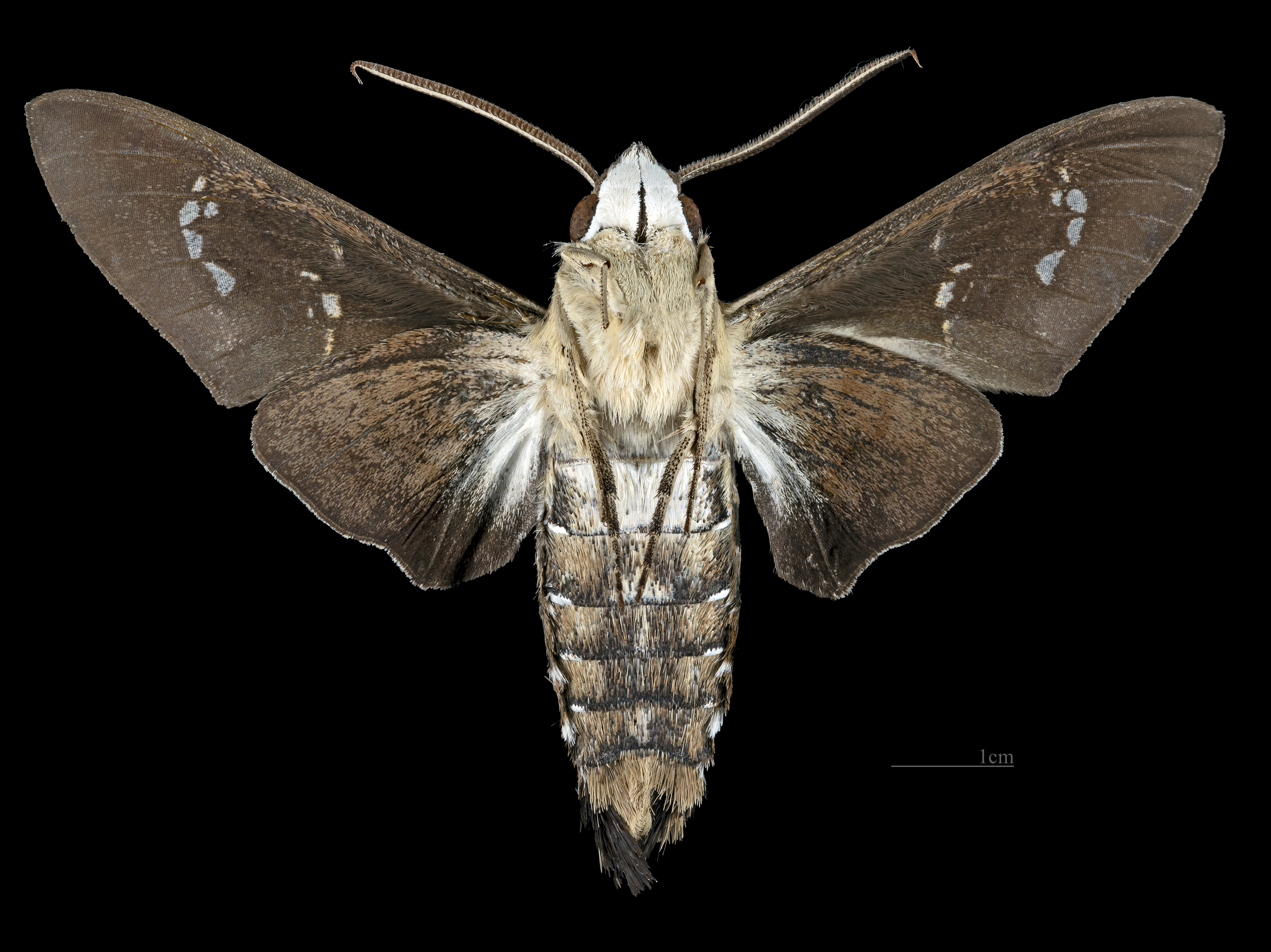
- Male ventral

Conservation status
- Secure (NatureServe)

Scientific classification
- Kingdom: Animalia
- Phylum: Arthropoda
- Clade: Pancrustacea
- Class: Insecta
- Order: Lepidoptera
- Family: Sphingidae
- Genus: Aellopos
- Species: A. clavipes

Binomial name
- Aellopos clavipes (Rothschild & Jordan, 1903)

Synonyms
- Sesia clavipes Rothschild & Jordan, 1903; Sesia clavipes eumelas Jordan, 1924

= Aellopos clavipes =

Clavipes sphinx

Species of moth

Aellopos clavipes, also known as the clavipes sphinx, is a moth of the family Sphingidae.

== Distribution ==
It lives mainly in Central America but ranges from Venezuela to California, Arizona, and Texas in the United States.

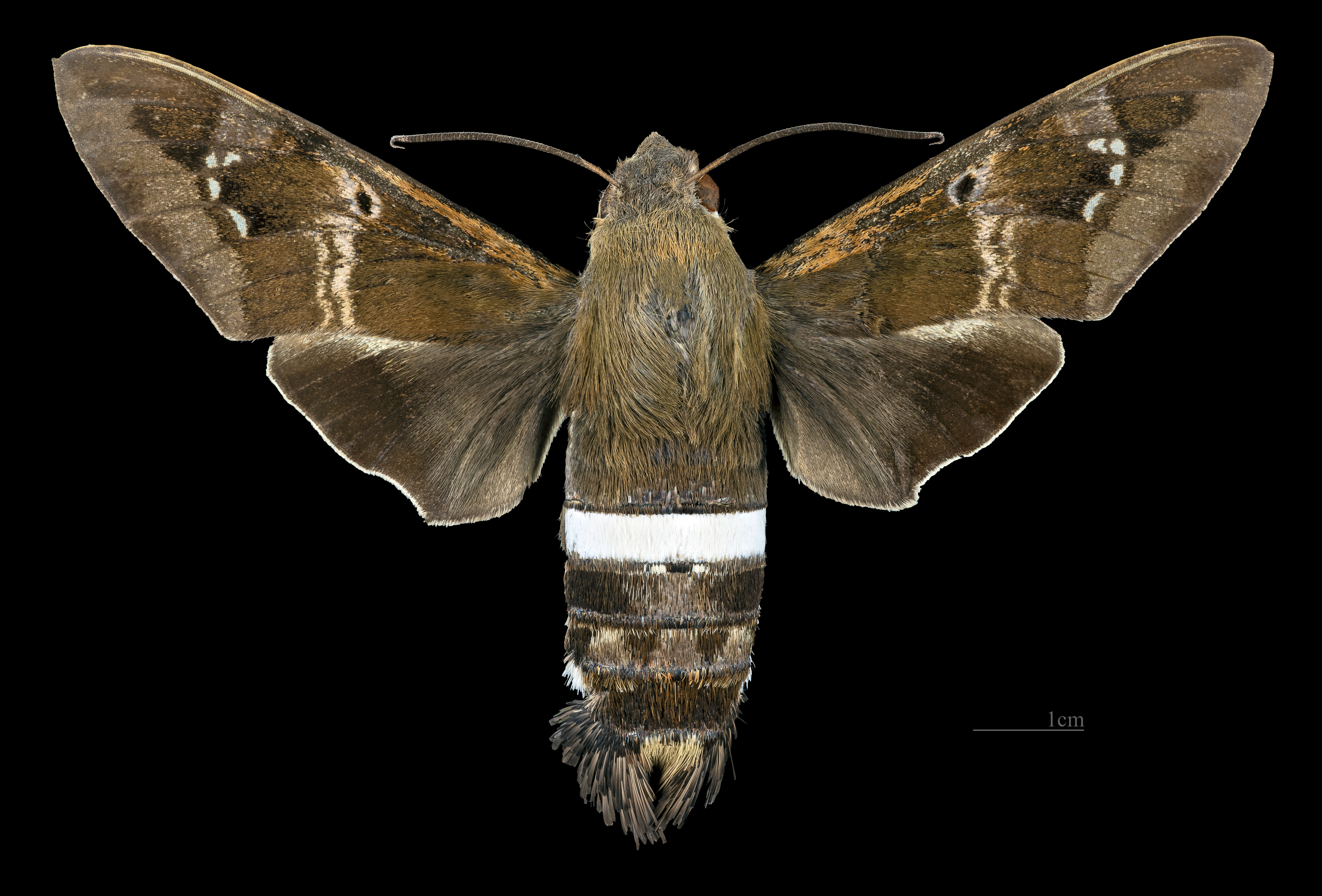
Female dorsal

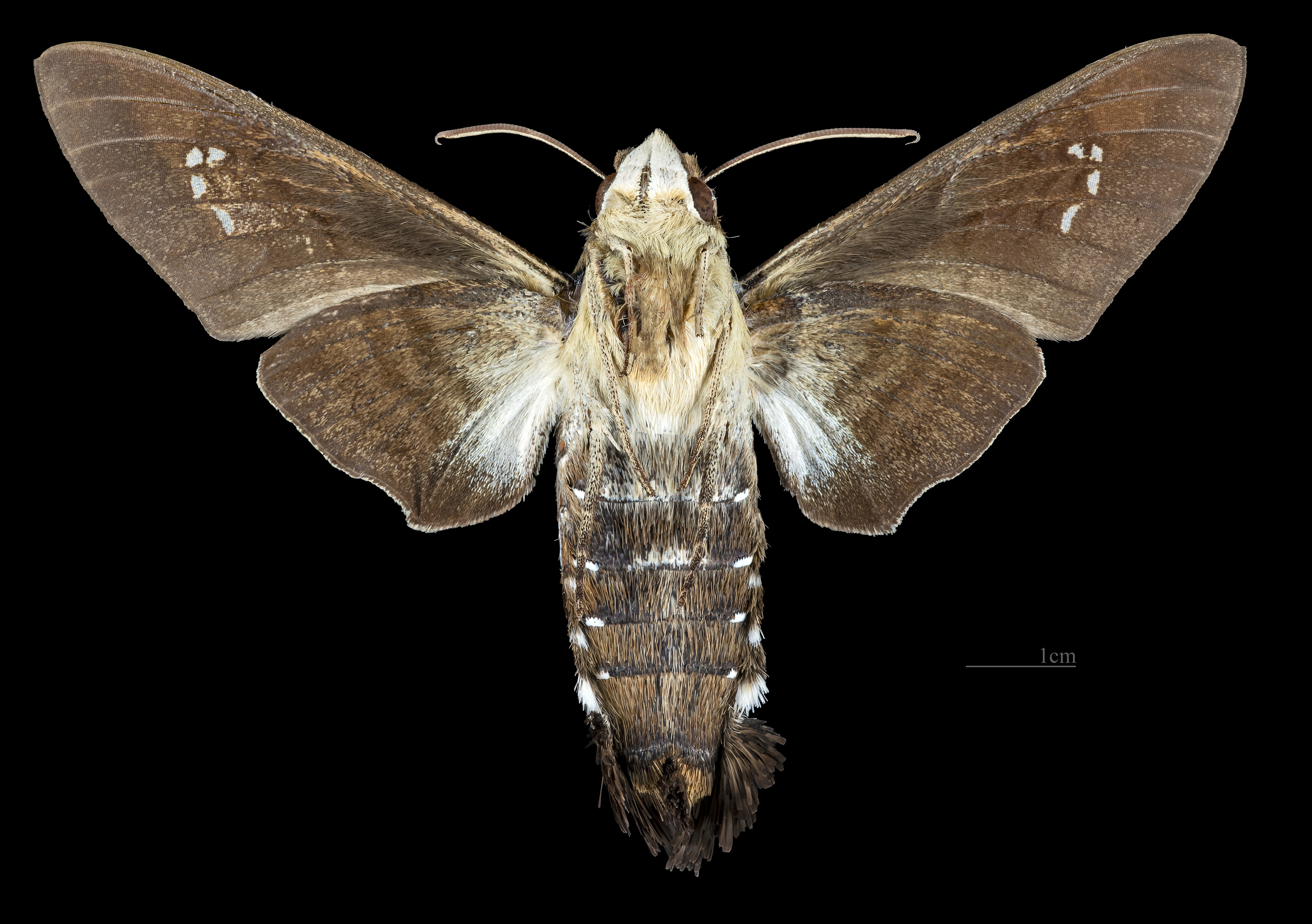
Female ventral

== Biology ==
Adults are on wing from May to December in Costa Rica. There are probably three main generations with adults on wing in December, from April to May and in September.

The larvae feed on various Rubiaceae species, including Randia rhagocarpa, Randia monantha, Randia aculeata, Guettarda macrosperma and Genipa americana. Pupation takes place in shallow underground chambers.

== Subspecies ==
- Aellopos clavipes clavipes
- Aellopos clavipes eumelas (Jordan, 1924) (Jamaica)
