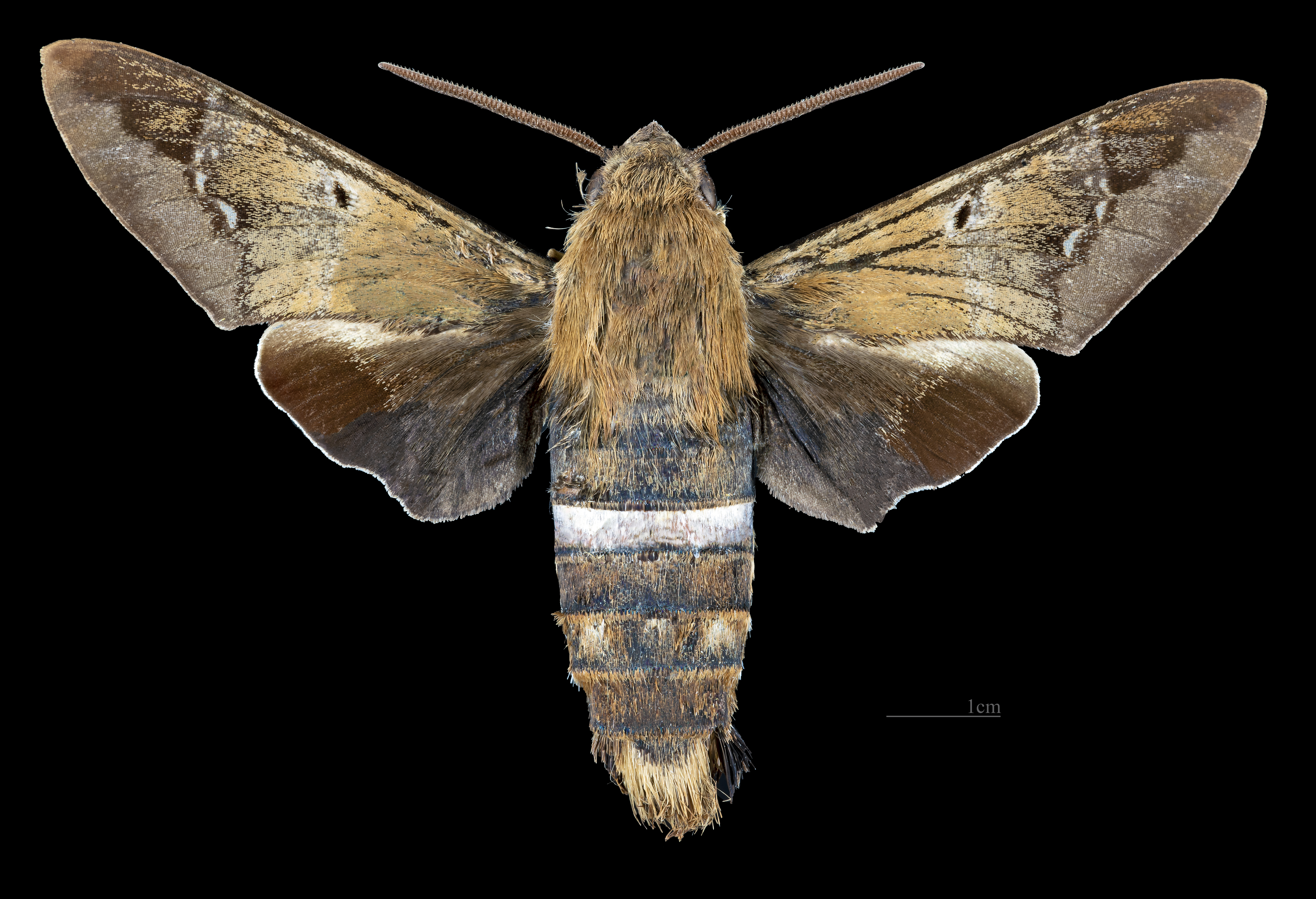
- Male dorsal
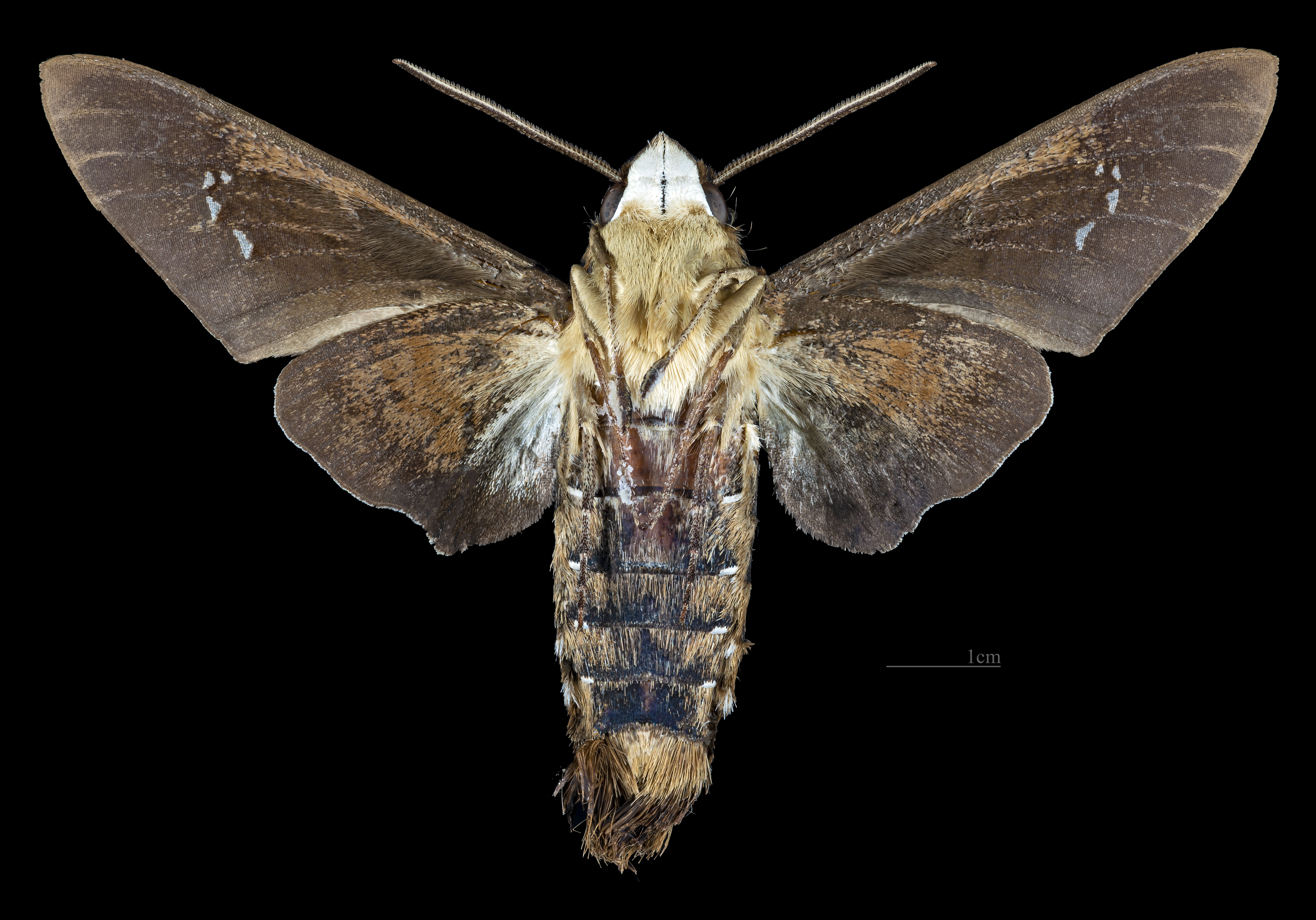
- Male venral

Scientific classification
- Kingdom: Animalia
- Phylum: Arthropoda
- Class: Insecta
- Order: Lepidoptera
- Family: Sphingidae
- Genus: Aellopos
- Species: A. tantalus

Binomial name
- Aellopos tantalus (Linnaeus, 1758)

Synonyms
- Sphinx tantalus Linnaeus, 1758; Sphinx ixion Linnaeus, 1758; Macroglossa sisyphus Burmeister, 1855; Sphinx terpunctata Goeze, 1780; Sphinx tantalus zonata Drury, 1773

= Aellopos tantalus =

Tantalus sphinx

Species of moth

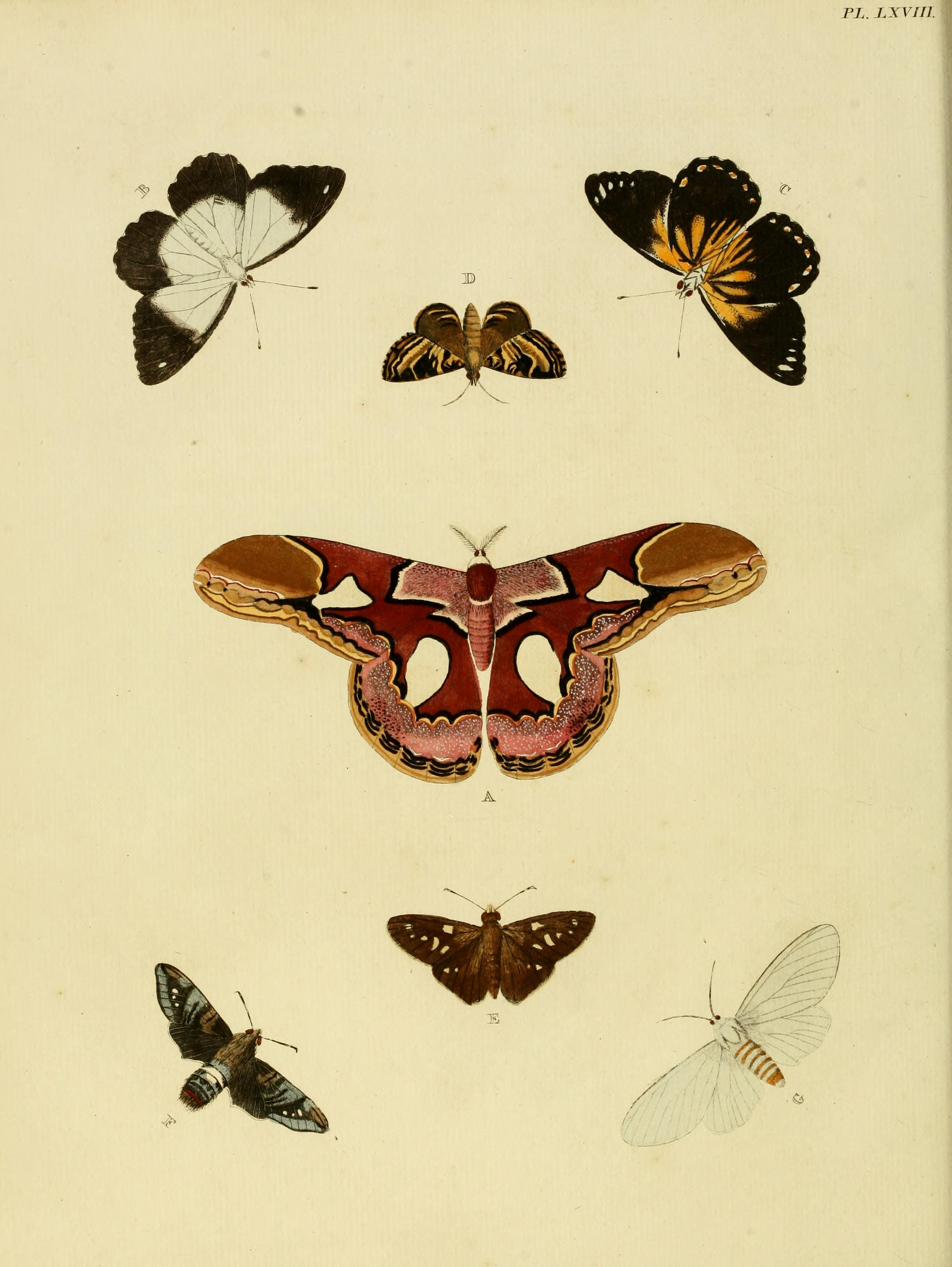

Aellopos tantalus, known as the Tantalus sphinx, is a moth of the family Sphingidae. It is found in Florida, the Antilles, from Mexico to Venezuela, Colombia, Ecuador, Suriname, and in the Amazon basin.

The wingspan is 45–57 millimetres (1.8–2.2 in). Adults are on wing year-round. The adults feed on nectar of various flowers, including Eugenia axillaris, Draceana fragrans and Ernodea littoralis.

The larvae feed on Rubiaceae species, including Casasia clusiifolia and Randia aculeata. Pupation takes place in loose cocoons in shallow underground chambers or in leaf litter.

== Subspecies ==
- Aellopos tantalus tantalus
- Aellopos tantalus zonata (Drury, 1773) (St. Kitts and Mexico)
