= Randia portoricensis =

Scientific classification
- Kingdom: Plantae
- Clade: Tracheophytes
- Clade: Angiosperms
- Clade: Eudicots
- Clade: Asterids
- Order: Gentianales
- Family: Rubiaceae
- Genus: Randia
- Species: R. portoricensis

Binomial name
- Randia portoricensis (Urb.) Britton & Standl.

Species of plant

Randia portoricensis, known commonly as the Puerto Rico indigoberry, is a species of shrub in the family Rubiaceae. It is endemic to Puerto Rico, and is found in thickets and semi-dry forests.
