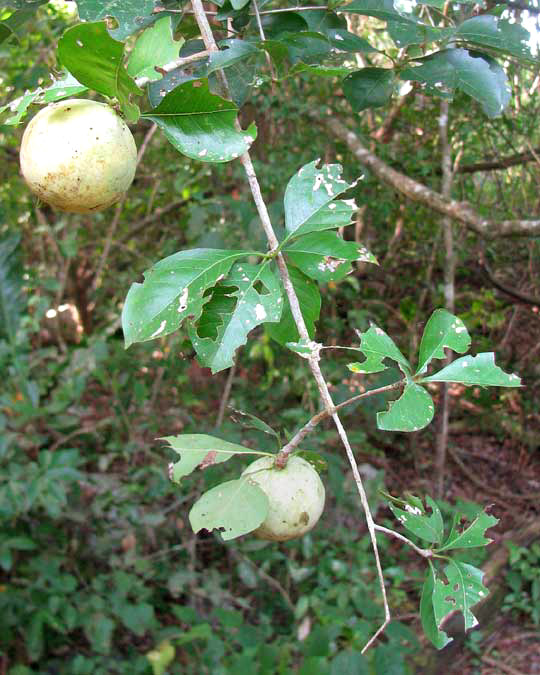
- Randia longiloba stem with leaves and spherical fruit

Scientific classification
- Kingdom: Plantae
- Clade: Embryophytes
- Clade: Tracheophytes
- Clade: Angiosperms
- Clade: Eudicots
- Clade: Asterids
- Order: Gentianales
- Family: Rubiaceae
- Genus: Randia
- Species: R. longiloba

Binomial name
- Randia longiloba Hemsl.

Synonyms
- Randia millspaughiana S.F.Blake

= Randia longiloba =

Species of plant

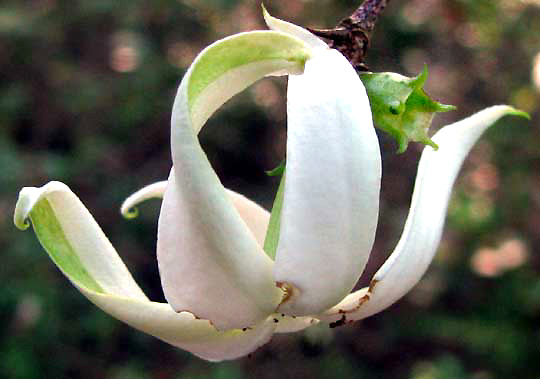
Randia longiloba flower side view; the immature, green fruit topped with five small sepals is visible at the top right.

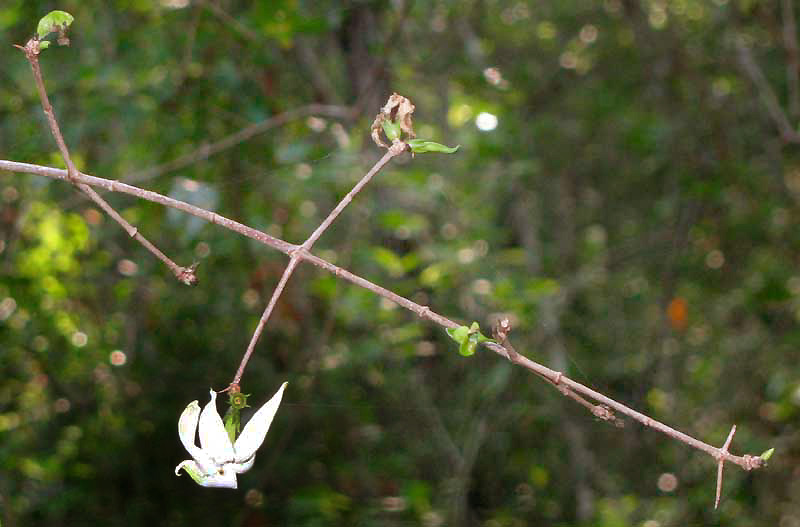
Randia longiloba flower with white corolla

Randia longiloba, with no English name, is a species of small tree endemic just to southeastern Mexico. It belongs to the family Rubiaceae.

== Description ==
Randia longiloba is recognized by these distinctive features:

- It is a shrub or small tree reaching 10 m (33 ft) high, armed at branch tips with paired spines up to 10 mm (0.4 in) long. Stipules up to 2 mm (0.08 in) long clustering at petiole bases are triangular, sharp-pointed, and may or may not persist with age.
- Leaves with short petioles are up to 10 cm long (4 inches) and about half as wide. They cluster at tips of stems and side spurs and are generally elliptic in shape. Blade margins bear no teeth, lobes or indentations, and have up to 10 secondary veins.
- Plants are dioecious, with a few very aromatic flowers arranged in clusters. Atop inferior ovaries, the bottom parts of the white corollas form tubes atop which 5 petals or lobes spread broadly. Male flowers are considerably smaller than female ones.
- Fruits are berry-type, spherical or nearly so, smooth and hairless, and up to 5 cm (2.0 in) in diameter. Seeds are up to 6 mm (0.24 in) long.

== Distribution ==
Randia longiloba is endemic just to the southeastern Mexican states of Campeche, Chiapas, Quintana Roo and Yucatan.

== Habitat ==
In Mexico's Yucatan Peninsula, Randia longiloba occurs in low- and medium-height dry forest and moist forests, including those with columnar cacti. Also they occur in acahuales, which basically constitute the revegetation stage of traditional slash-and-burn agriculture, with the possibility of using the cut woody plants, not just burn them.

== Ecology ==
The fruit of Randia longiloba provides food for birds and squirrels.

== Human interactions ==
=== In traditional ceremonies ===
In Mexico's Yucatan Peninsula the Mayan people hollow out the spherical fruits of Randia longiloba so that the hard rinds can serve as cups to hold sacred atole during religious ceremonies.

=== In traditional medicine ===
An infusion of Randia longiloba bark has been used to treat dengue fever.

=== As a nematicide ===
Extracts from Randia longiloba produce a mortality greater than 80% for the root-knot nematode Meloidogyne incognita, known as probably the most economically important plant-parasitic nematode.

=== For making charcoal ===
In the Mexican state of Quintana Roo the wood of Randia longiloba is converted to charcoal.

== Taxonomy ==
Randia longiloba was named and formally described by William Botting Hemsley in 1886. In the text, the name is written Randia ? longiloba, as a proposal, remarking that although he'd not seen the fruit, since the flowers had one-celled ovaries, "... it seems better to refer it to Randia rather than Gardenia.

=== Etymology ===
The genus name Randia is a New Latin construction meant to honor the English botanist Isaac Rand.

The species name longiloba is New Latin based on the Latin longus, meaning "long", and Greek lobos, for lobe -- "long-lobed". Probably this refers to the species' long corolla lobes, for when Hemsley formally described Randia longiloba he remarked that the corolla lobes relative to the corolla tube were long.
