= Rosenbergiodendron reflexum =

Scientific classification
- Kingdom: Plantae
- Clade: Tracheophytes
- Clade: Angiosperms
- Clade: Eudicots
- Clade: Asterids
- Order: Gentianales
- Family: Rubiaceae
- Genus: Rosenbergiodendron
- Species: R. reflexum

Binomial name
- Rosenbergiodendron reflexum C.M. Taylor & Lorence

Species of plant

Rosenbergiodendron reflexum is a species of shrub in the family Rubiaceae. It is native to Peru.
