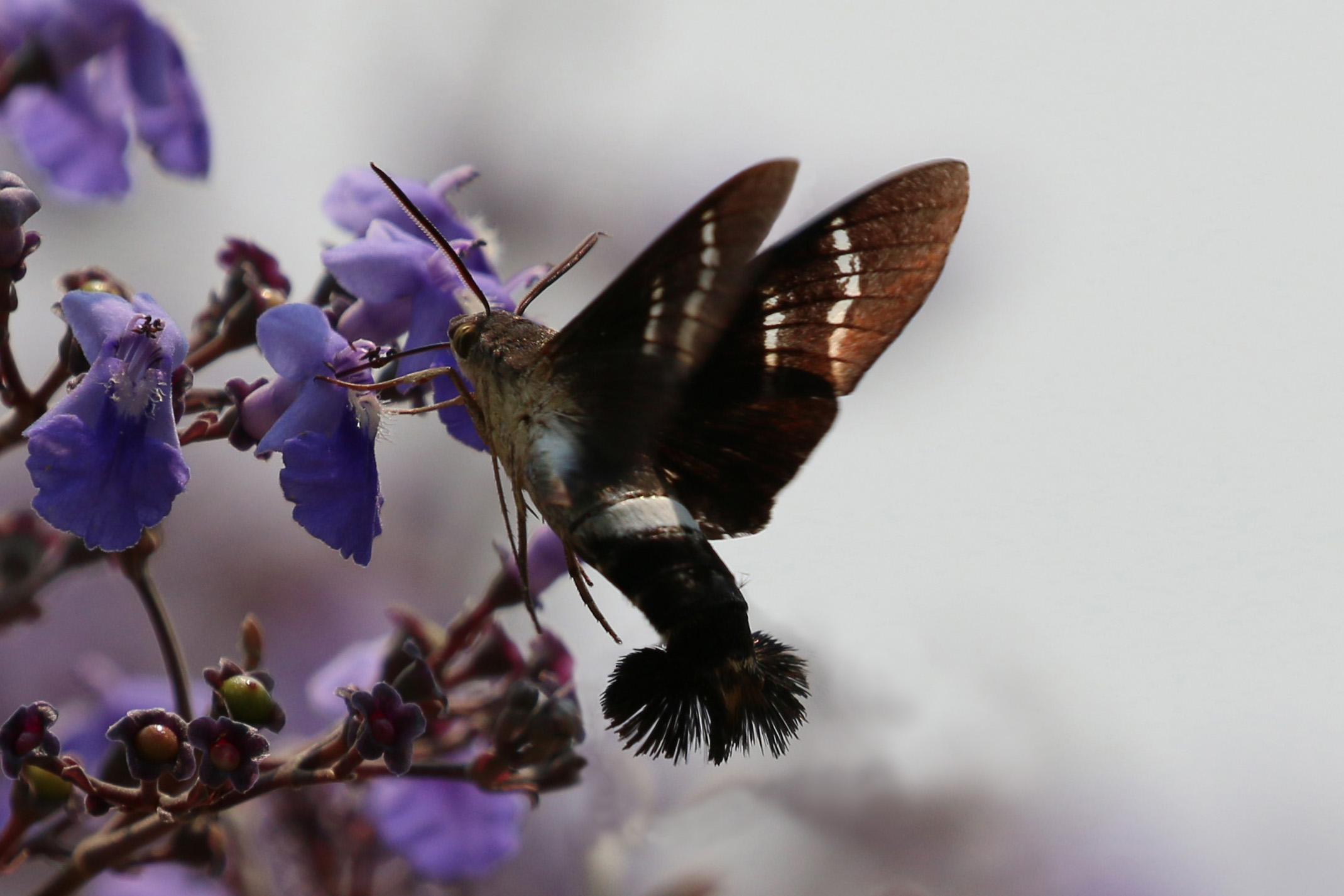
- A. t. titan in the Pantanal, Brazil

Scientific classification
- Kingdom: Animalia
- Phylum: Arthropoda
- Class: Insecta
- Order: Lepidoptera
- Family: Sphingidae
- Genus: Aellopos
- Species: A. titan

Binomial name
- Aellopos titan (Cramer, 1777)

Synonyms
- Sphinx titan Cramer, 1777; Aellopos titan aguacana Gehlen, 1944; Sesia titan cubana Clark, 1936

= Aellopos titan =

Titan sphinx

Species of moth

Aellopos titan, the Titan sphinx, is a moth of the family Sphingidae. The species was first described by Pieter Cramer in 1777.

== Distribution ==
It has been found all the way from Maine in the United States through Central America and south to Argentina and Uruguay in South America.

== Description ==
The wingspan is 55–65 mm.

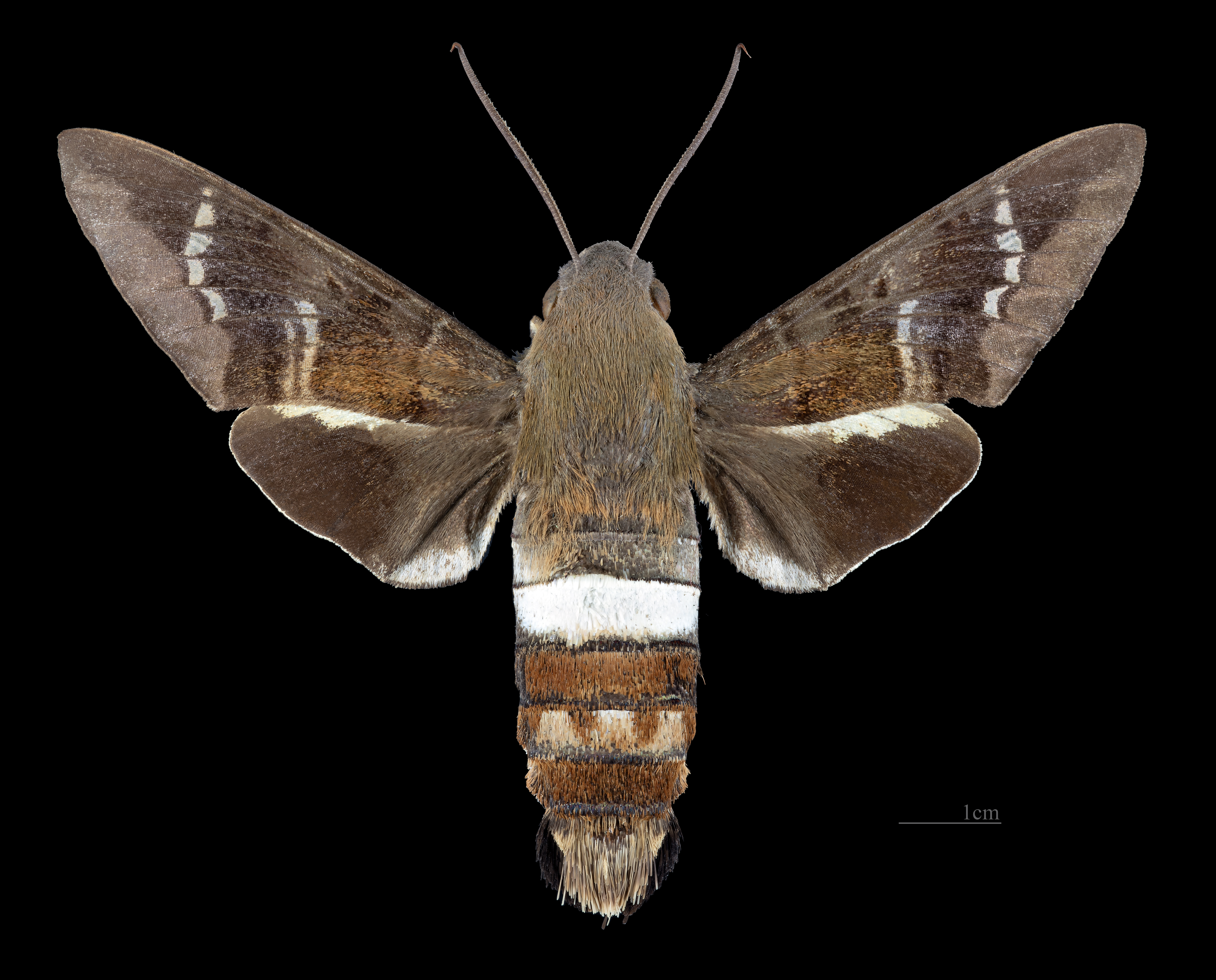
Male dorsal

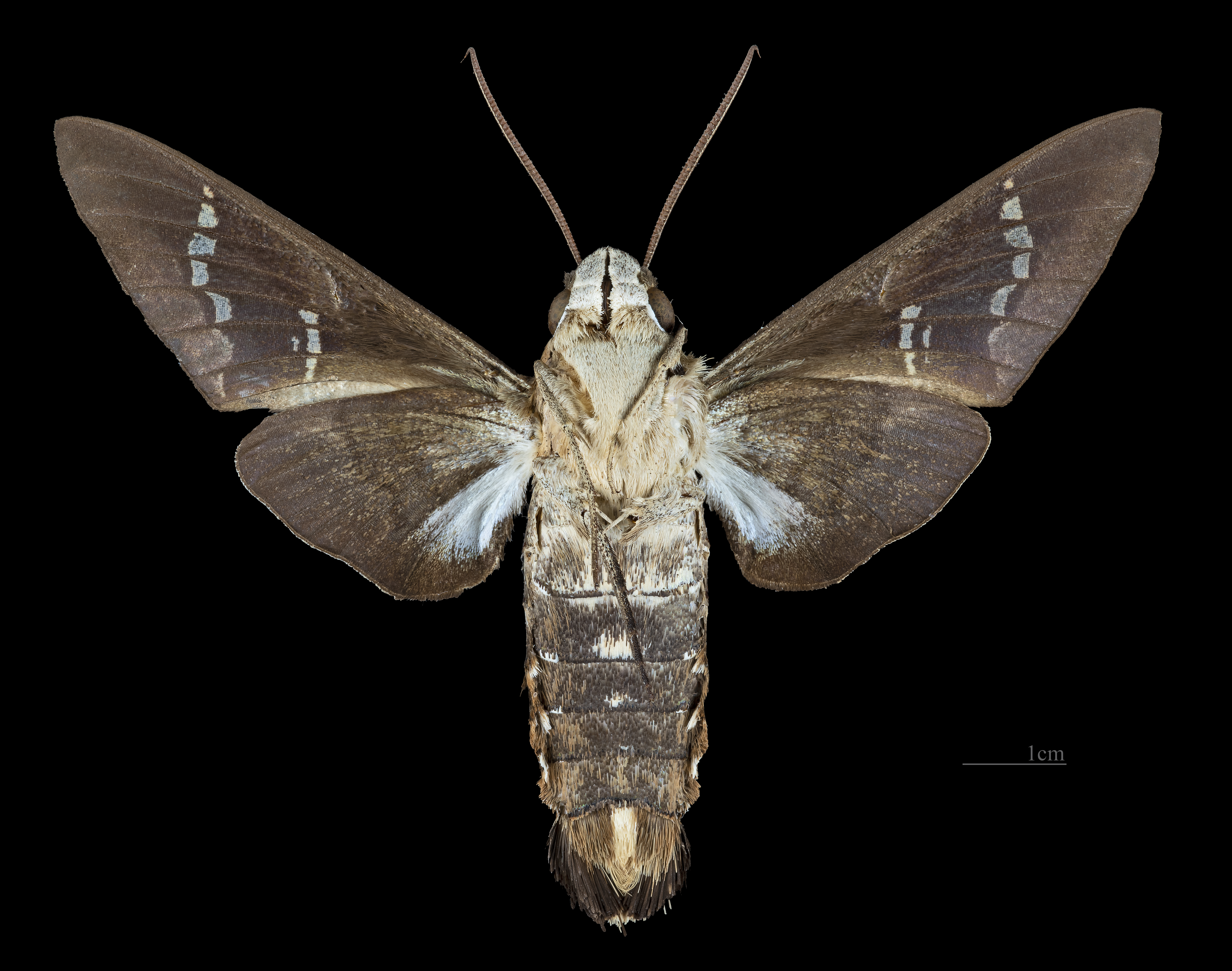
Male ventral

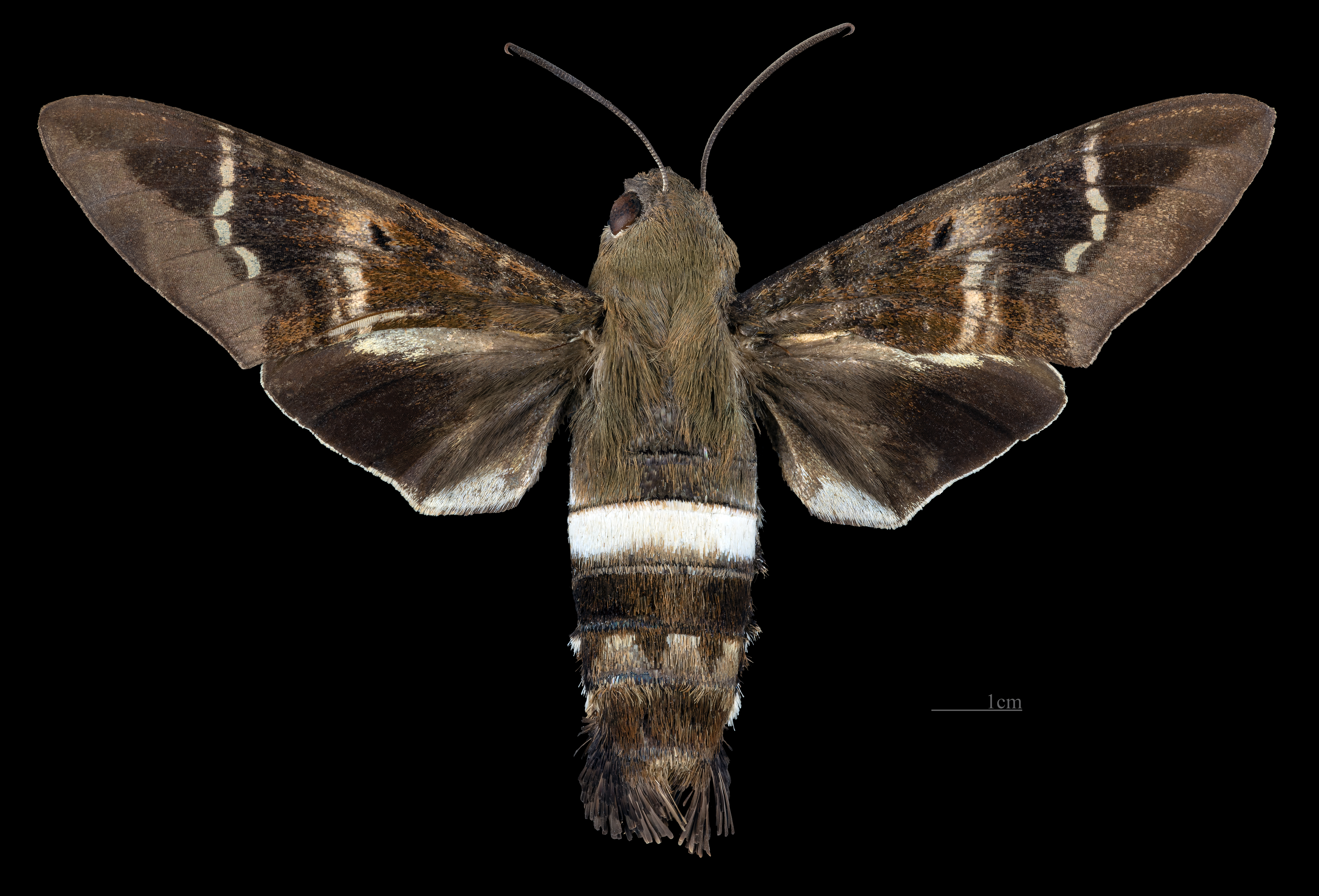
Female dorsal

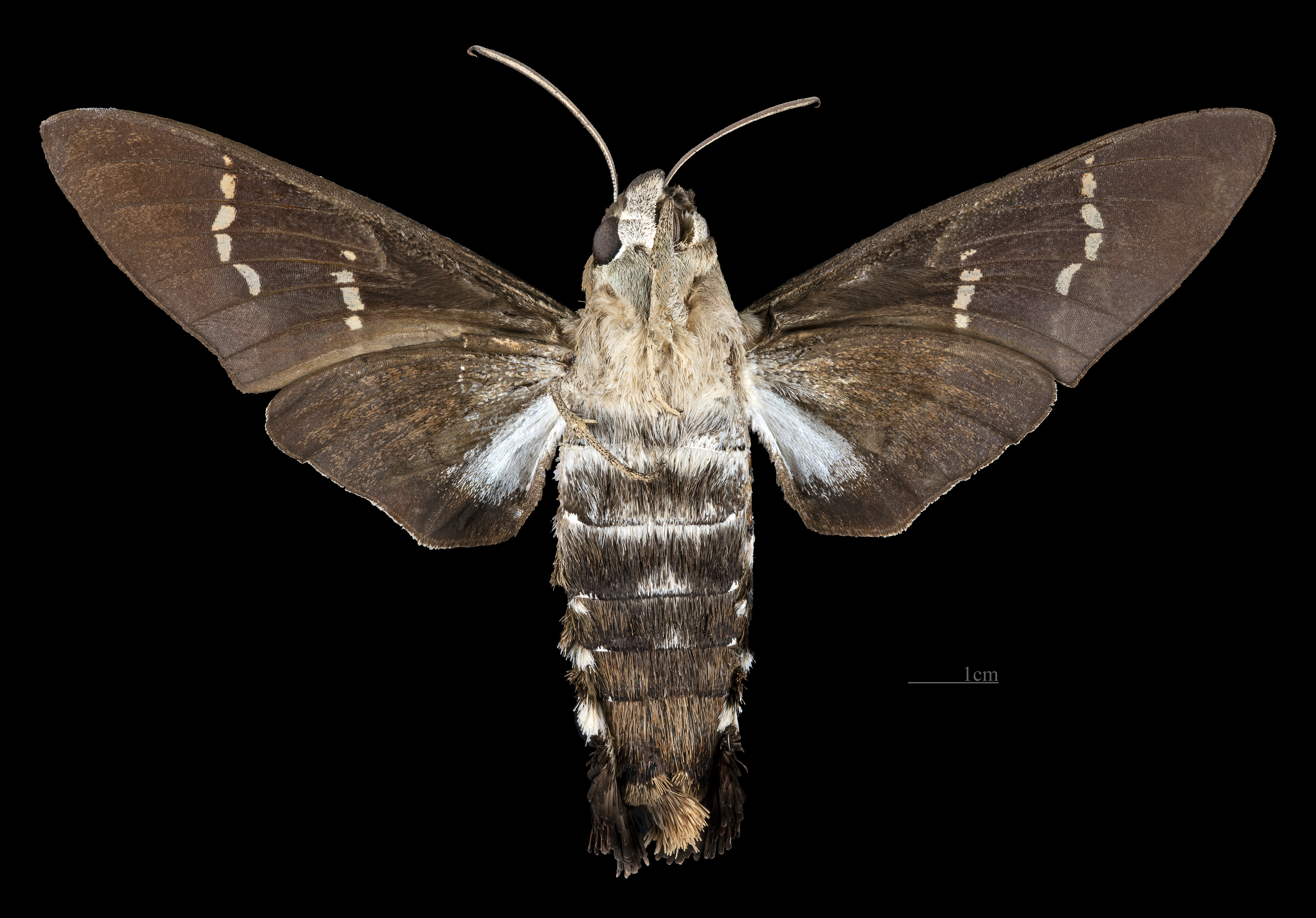
Female ventral

== Subspecies ==
- Aellopos titan titan - Brazil
- Aellopos titan cubana (Clark, 1936) - Cuba
