= Randia pleiomeris =

Conservation status
- Data Deficient (IUCN 2.3)

Scientific classification
- Kingdom: Plantae
- Clade: Tracheophytes
- Clade: Angiosperms
- Clade: Eudicots
- Clade: Asterids
- Order: Gentianales
- Family: Rubiaceae
- Genus: Randia
- Species: R. pleiomeris

Binomial name
- Randia pleiomeris Standley

Species of plant

Randia pleiomeris is a species of plant in the family Rubiaceae. It is found in El Salvador and Guatemala. It is threatened by habitat loss.
