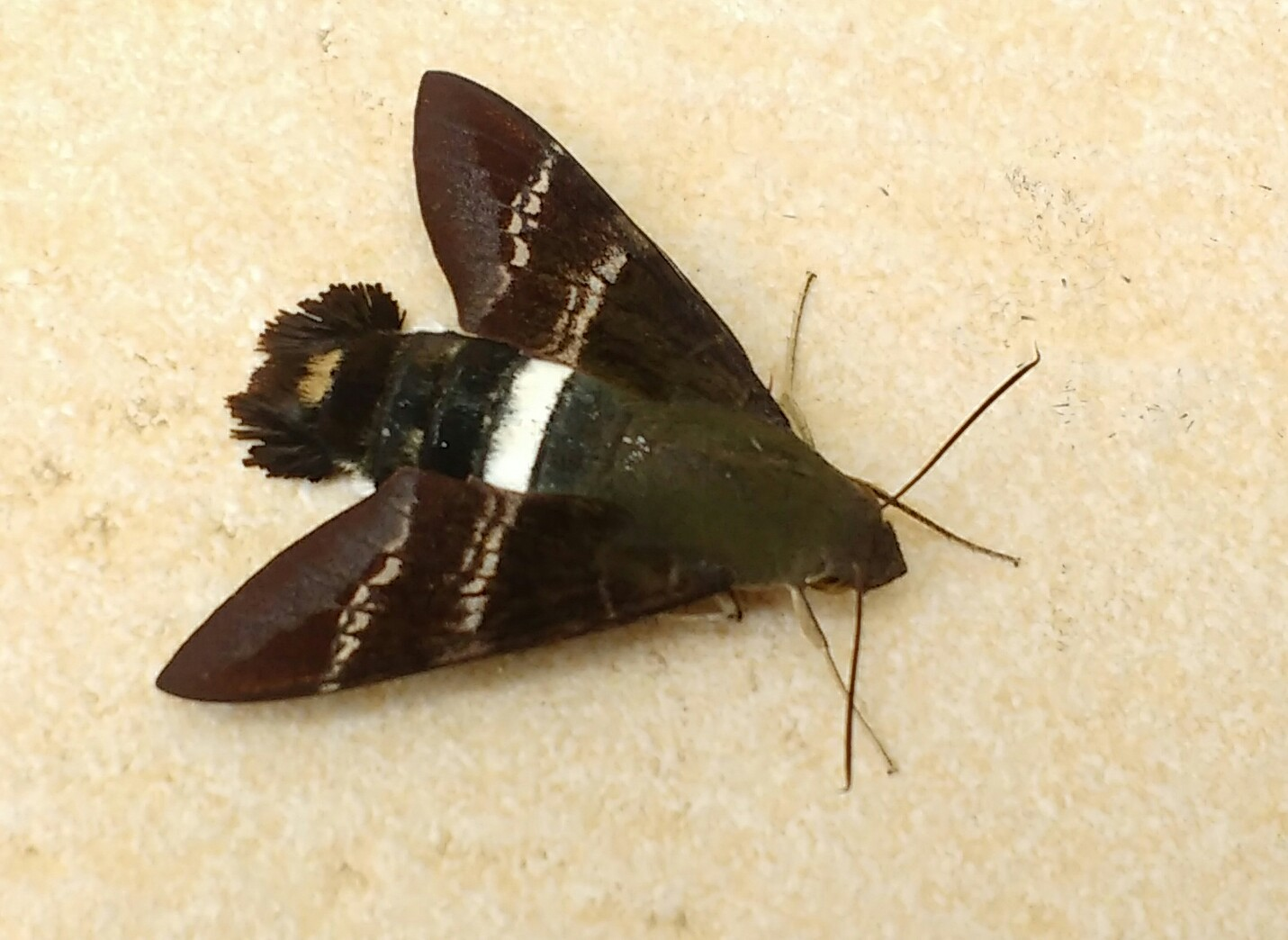

Scientific classification
- Kingdom: Animalia
- Phylum: Arthropoda
- Class: Insecta
- Order: Lepidoptera
- Family: Sphingidae
- Genus: Aellopos
- Species: A. fadus

Binomial name
- Aellopos fadus (Cramer, 1776)

Synonyms
- Sphinx fadus Cramer, 1775; Macroglossa balteata Kirtland, 1851; Macroglossum annulosum Swainson, 1823; Sesia fadus flavosignata (Closs, 1916)

= Aellopos fadus =

Fadus sphinx

Species of moth

Aellopos fadus, the Fadus sphinx, is a moth of the family Sphingidae. The species was first described by Pieter Cramer in 1776.

== Distribution ==
It lives in Central America and the northern part of South America.

== Description ==
The wingspan is 57–60 mm.

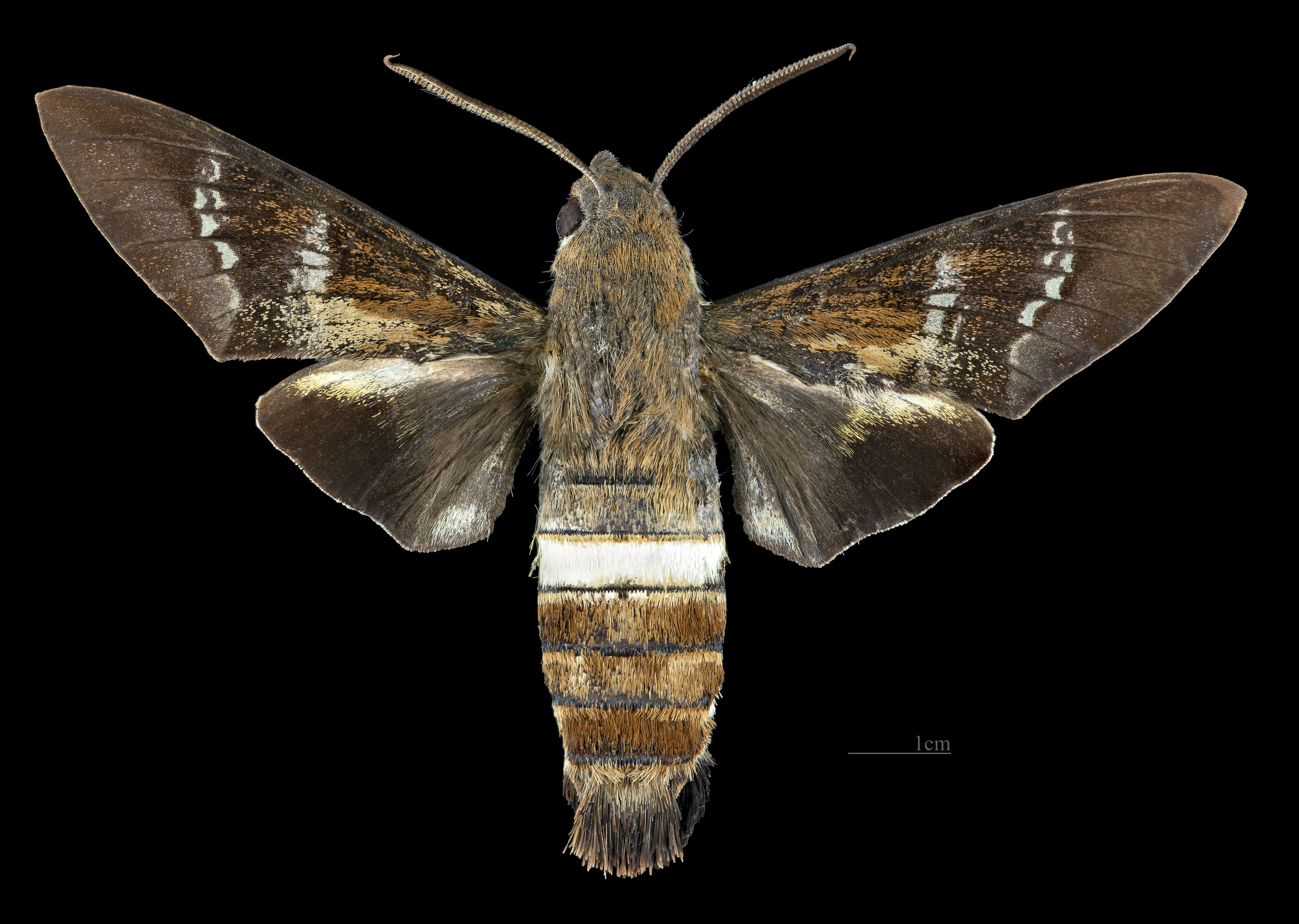
Male dorsal

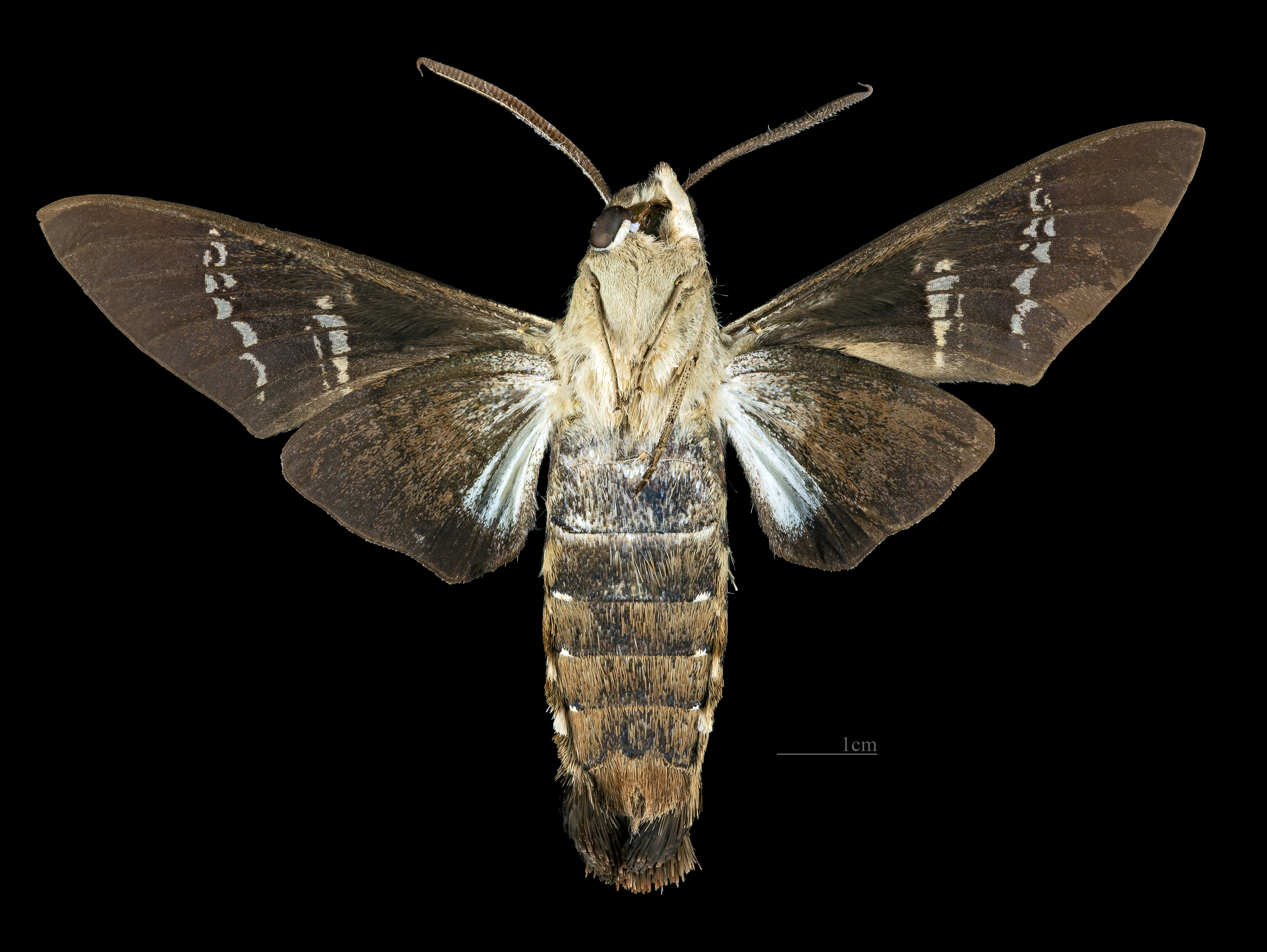
Male ventral

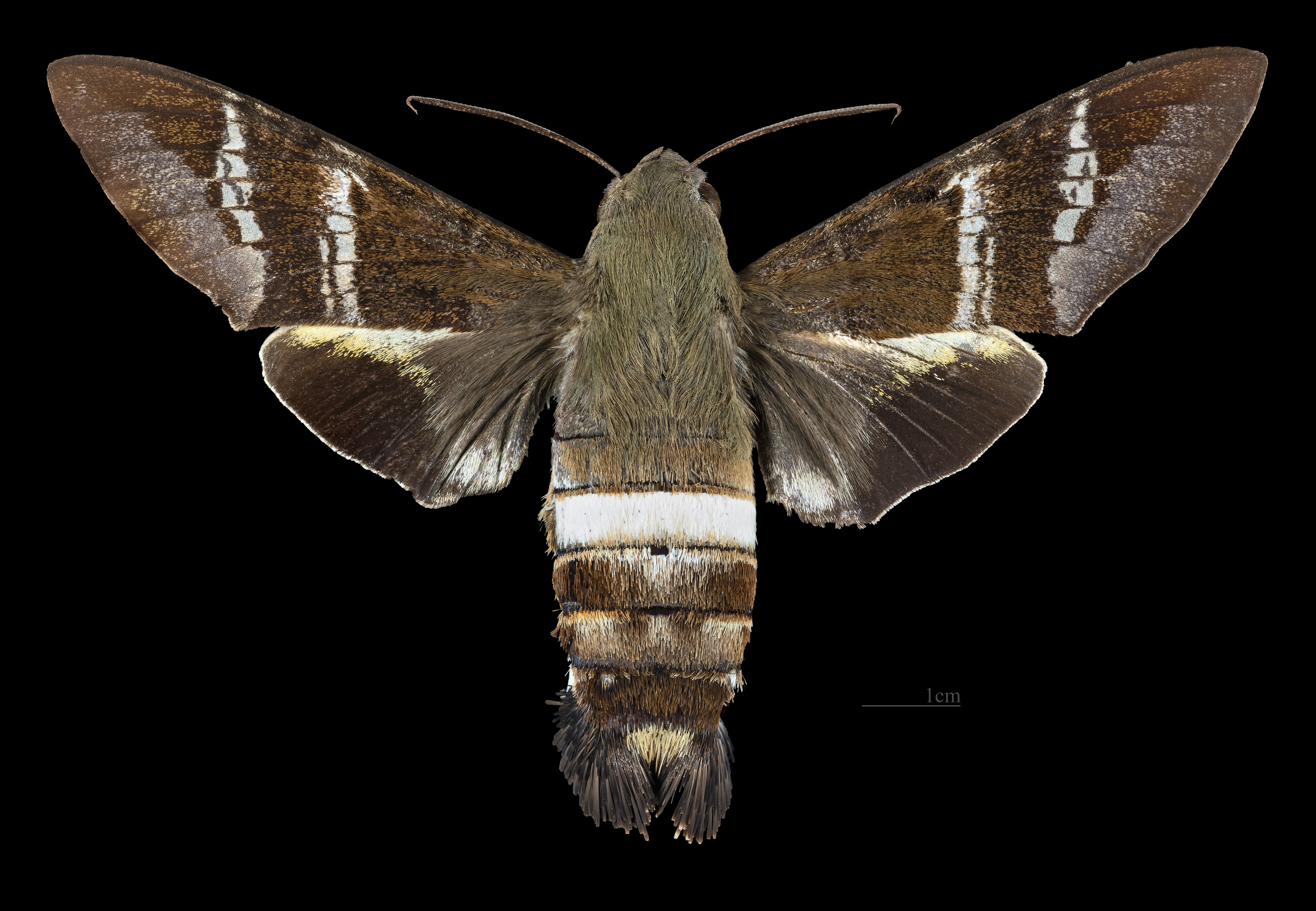
Female dorsal

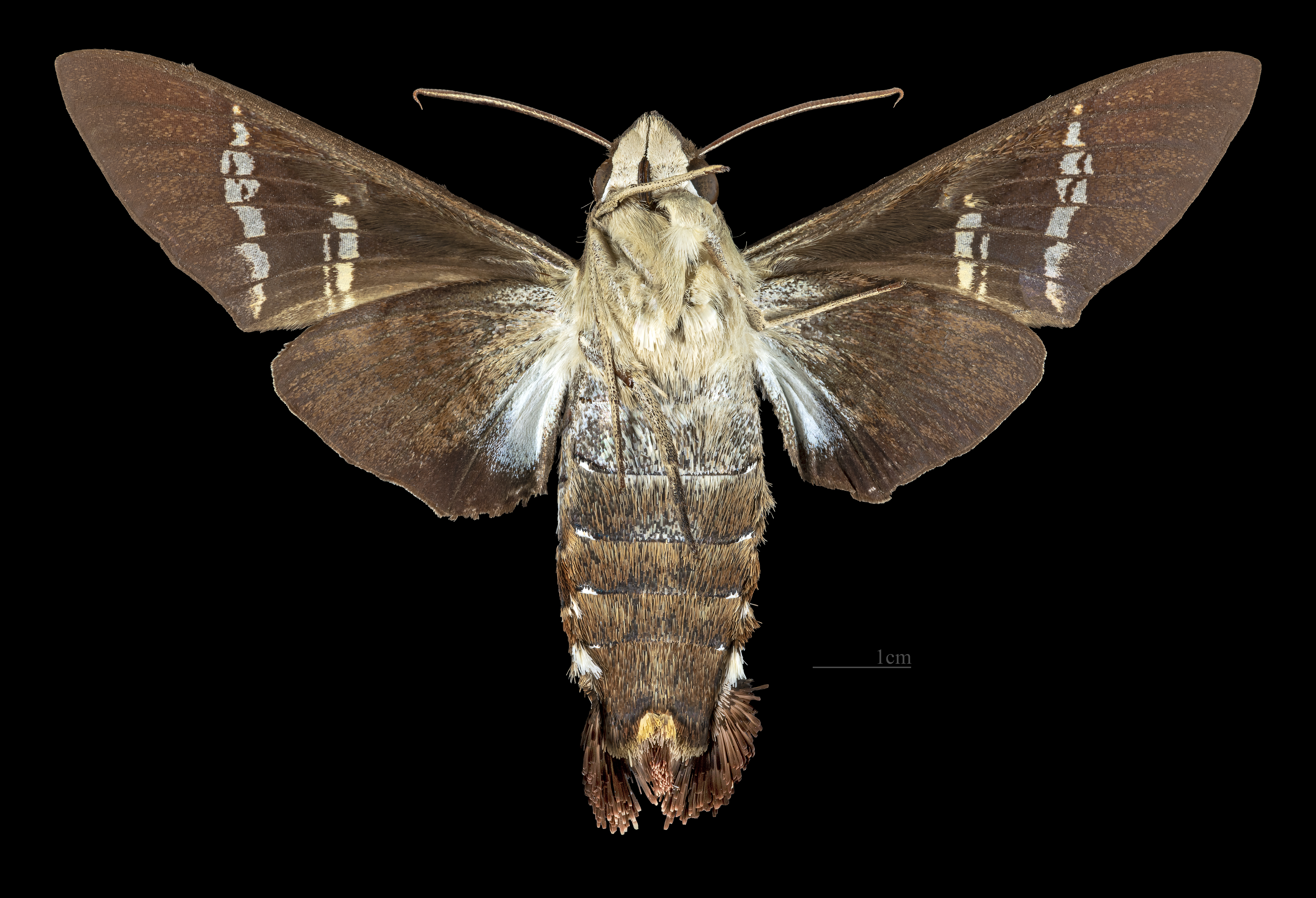
Female ventral

== Biology ==
Adults are on wing year round in the tropics. They feed on nectar from various flowers, including Abelia species.

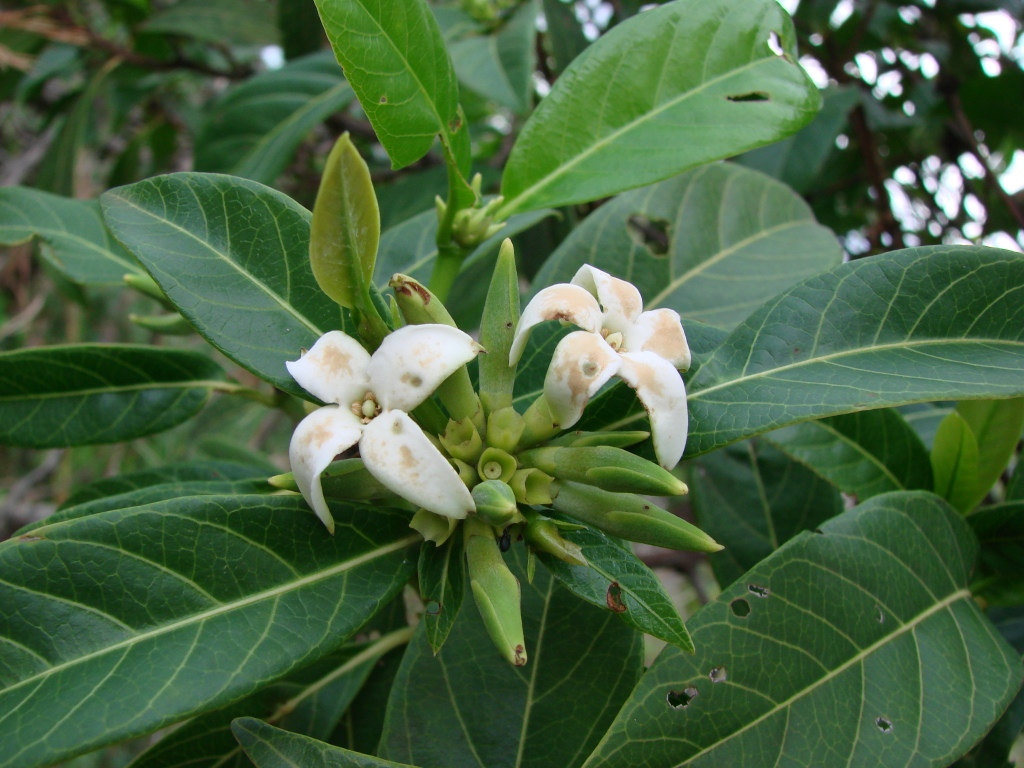
