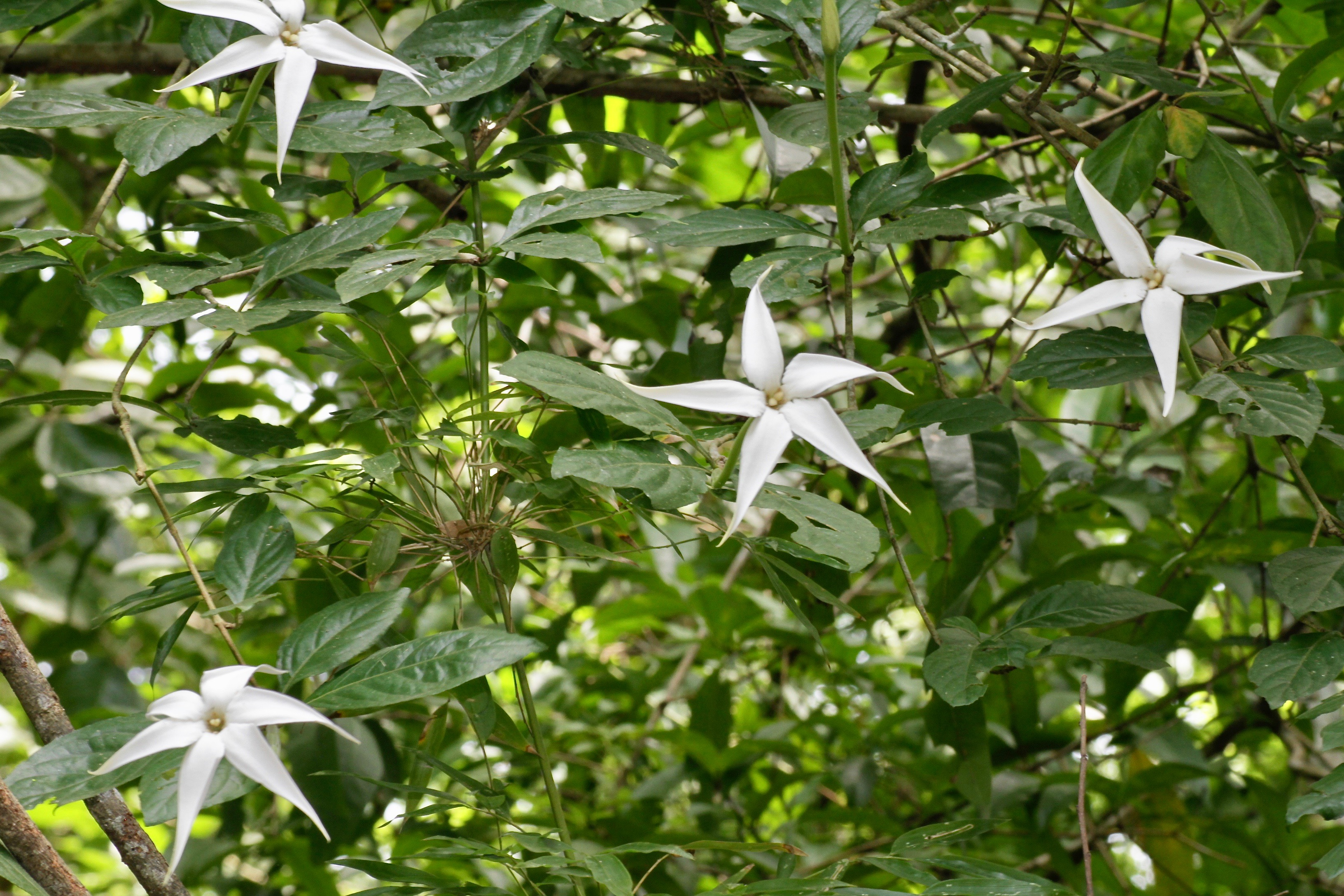
- Rosenbergiodendron formosum

Scientific classification
- Kingdom: Plantae
- Clade: Tracheophytes
- Clade: Angiosperms
- Clade: Eudicots
- Clade: Asterids
- Order: Gentianales
- Family: Rubiaceae
- Subfamily: Ixoroideae
- Tribe: Gardenieae
- Genus: Rosenbergiodendron; Fagerl.

Type species
- Rosenbergiodendron formosum (Jacq.) Fagerl.

= Rosenbergiodendron =

Genus of plants

Rosenbergiodendron is a genus of plants in the Rubiaceae. At present (May 2014), it contains 4 recognized species, all native to tropical America.

- Rosenbergiodendron densiflorum (K.Schum.) Fagerl. - Jamaica, Trinidad, the Leeward Islands, French Guinea, Guyana, Suriname, Venezuela, Colombia, Brazil
- Rosenbergiodendron formosum (Jacq.) Fagerl.
  - Rosenbergiodendron formosum var. formosum - Panama, Colombia, Venezuela, Ecuador
  - Rosenbergiodendron formosum var. nitidum (K.Schum.) C.Gust. - Venezuela
- Rosenbergiodendron longiflorum (Ruiz & Pav.) Fagerl - French Guinea, Guyana, Suriname, Venezuela, Colombia, Brazil, Ecuador, Peru, Paraguay
- Rosenbergiodendron reflexum C.M.Taylor & Lorence - Peru
