= Randia carlosiana =

Conservation status
- Endangered (IUCN 3.1)

Scientific classification
- Kingdom: Plantae
- Clade: Tracheophytes
- Clade: Angiosperms
- Clade: Eudicots
- Clade: Asterids
- Order: Gentianales
- Family: Rubiaceae
- Genus: Randia
- Species: R. carlosiana

Binomial name
- Randia carlosiana K.Krause

Species of plant

Randia carlosiana is a species of flowering plant in the family Rubiaceae. It is endemic to Ecuador.
