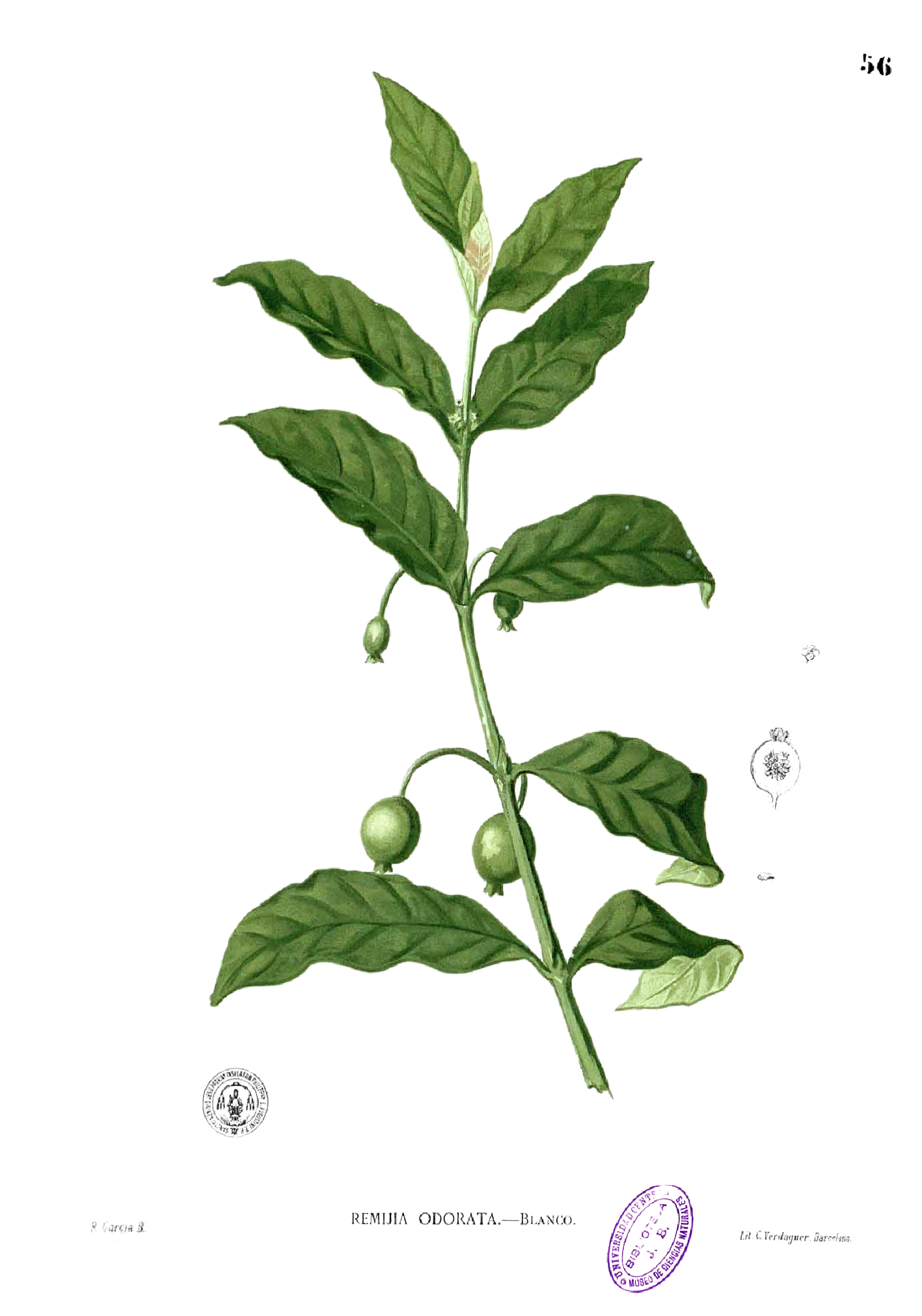
- Randia densiflora

Scientific classification
- Kingdom: Plantae
- Clade: Tracheophytes
- Clade: Angiosperms
- Clade: Eudicots
- Clade: Asterids
- Order: Gentianales
- Family: Rubiaceae
- Subfamily: Ixoroideae
- Tribe: Gardenieae
- Genus: Randia; L.

Species
- Many, see text.

Synonyms
- Basanacantha Hook.f. Foscarenia Vell. ex Vand. Gynaecopachys Hassk. Rangia Griseb.

= Randia (plant) =

Genus of plants

Randia, commonly known as indigoberry, is a mostly Neotropical genus of shrubs or small trees in the Rubiaceae. As of February 2022 Plants of the World Online lists a total of 112 accepted species in the genus. Several Australian species have been reassigned to the genus Atractocarpus. These include the garden plants Atractocarpus chartaceus and A. fitzalanii.

Carl Linnaeus retained the name Randia, applied by Houston to commemorate Isaac Rand.

Species of this genus are generally dioecious, with separate male and female plants, although exceptions exist. They are trees, shrubs, and lianas, and may be deciduous or evergreen.

== Selected species ==
- Randia aculeata L. (= Genipa aculeata) – White Indigoberry
- Randia altiscandens (Ducke) C.M.Taylor
- Randia aristeguietae Steyerm.
- Randia armata (Sw.) DC.
- Randia carlosiana K.Krause
- Randia ciliolata C.Wright (= Genipa ciliolata)
- Randia cinerea (Fernald) Standl. (= Genipa cinerea)
- Randia densiflora
- Randia echinocarpa Moc. & Sessé ex DC. (= Genipa echinocarpa) – Papache
- Randia keithii
- Randia laevigata Standl. – Sapuchi
- Randia longiloba Hemsl.
- Randia matudae Lorence & Dwyer (= Casasia chiapensis)
- Randia mixe sp. nov.
- Randia moorei F.Muell. ex Benth
- Randia nelsonii Greenm.
- Randia nicaraguensis Lorence & Dwyer
- Randia nitida (Kunth) DC.
- Randia obcordata S.Watson – Papache Borracho
- Randia parvifolia Lam. – Smallflower Indigoberry
- Randia pleiomeris Standl.
- Randia portoricensis (Urban) Britt. & Standl. – Puerto Rico Indigoberry
- Randia rhagocarpa Standl. – Crucillo
- Randia sezitat Guillaumin (= Genipa sezitat)
- Randia sonorensis Wiggins – Papache del Zorro
- Randia spinifex (Roem. & Schult.) Standl. (= Genipa sagreana)
- Randia thurberi S.Watson
- Randia tubericollis

=== Formerly placed here ===
- Atractocarpus benthamianus (F.Muell.) Puttock (as R. benthamiana F.Muell.)
- Atractocarpus carolinensis (Valeton) Puttock (as R. carolinensis Valeton)
- Atractocarpus chartaceus (F.Muell.) Puttock (as R. chartacea (F.Muell.) F.Muell.)
- Atractocarpus crosbyi (Burkill) Puttock (as R. crosbyi Burkill)
- Atractocarpus decorus (Valeton) Puttock (as R. decora Valeton)
- Atractocarpus fitzalanii (F.Muell.) Puttock (as R. fitzalanii (F.Muell.) Benth.)
- Atractocarpus hirtus (F.Muell.) Puttock (as R. hirta (F.Muell.) F.Muell.)
- Atractocarpus macarthurii (F.Muell.) Puttock (as R. macarthurii F.Muell.)
- Atractocarpus sessilis (F.Muell.) Puttock (as R. sessilis F.Muell.)
- Atractocarpus stipularis (F.Muell.) Puttock ex P.S.Green (as Randia stipularis F.Muell.)
- Atractocarpus tahitiensis (Nadeaud) Puttock (as R. tahitiensis Nadeaud)
- Atractocarpus tenuiflorus (A.C.Sm.) Puttock (as R. tenuiflora A.C.Sm.)
- Atractocarpus versteegii (Valeton) Puttock (as R. versteegii Valeton)
- Aidia cochinchinensis Lour. (as R. henryi E.Pritz. or R. cochinchinensis (Lour.) Merr.)
- Aidia genipiflora (DC.) Dandy (as R. genipiflora DC.)
- Benkara malabarica (Lam.) Tirveng. (as R. malabarica Lam.)
- Benkara sinensis (Lour.) Ridsdale (as R. sinensis (Lour.) Schult.)
- Catunaregam spinosa (Thunb.) Tirveng. (as R. dumetorum (Retz.) Poir. or R. spinosa (Thunb.) Poir.)
- Catunaregam tomentosa (Blume ex DC.) Tirveng. (as R. tomentosa (Blume ex DC.) Hook.f.)
- Coddia rudis (E.Mey. ex Harv.) Verdc. (as R. rudis E. Mey. ex Harv.)
- Porterandia penduliflora (K.Schum.) Keay (as R. penduliflora K.Schum. or R. sericantha K.Schum. ex Engl.)
- Rosenbergiodendron formosum (Jacq.) Fagerl. (as R. formosa (Jacq.) K.Schum. or R. mussaenda (L.f.) DC.)
- Rosenbergiodendron longiflorum (Ruiz & Pav.) Fagerl. (as R. ruiziana DC.)
- Rothmannia longiflora Salisb. (as R. maculata DC.)
- Rothmannia whitfieldii (Lindl.) Dandy (as R. malleifera (Hook.) Benth. & Hook.f.)
- Tamilnadia uliginosa (Retz.) Tirveng. & Sastre (as R. uliginosa (Retz.) Poir.)
