= Randia nicaraguensis =

Scientific classification
- Kingdom: Plantae
- Clade: Tracheophytes
- Clade: Angiosperms
- Clade: Eudicots
- Clade: Asterids
- Order: Gentianales
- Family: Rubiaceae
- Genus: Randia
- Species: R. nicaraguensis

Binomial name
- Randia nicaraguensis Lorence & Dwyer

Species of plant

Randia nicaraguensis is a plant species endemic to Nicaragua. It occurs in tropical drought-deciduous forests at elevations below 850 m.

Randia nicaraguensis is a dioecious, deciduous shrub or small tree up to 3 m tall, with a spiny trunk, spiny twigs and exfoliating bark. Leaves are thick and leathery, obovate to lanceolate with winged rachis, the blade up to 10 cm long. Flowers are produced in the tips of branches. Flowers are trumpet-shaped, white or yellow with a green center, up to 15 mm long. Fruits are hard, spherical, up to 70 mm in diameter.
