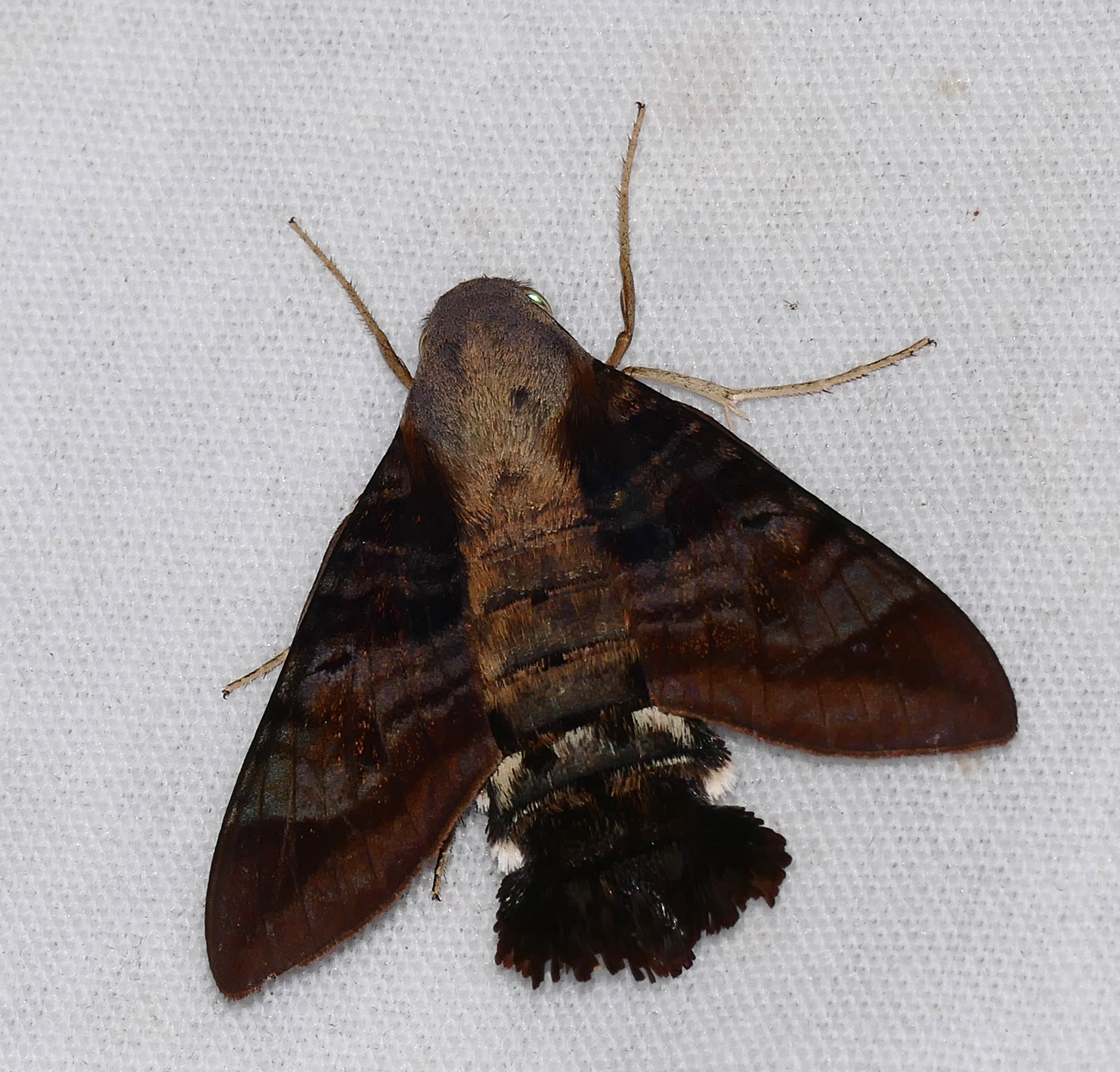

Scientific classification
- Kingdom: Animalia
- Phylum: Arthropoda
- Class: Insecta
- Order: Lepidoptera
- Family: Sphingidae
- Genus: Aellopos
- Species: A. ceculus

Binomial name
- Aellopos ceculus (Cramer, 1777)

Synonyms
- Sphinx ceculus Cramer, 1777; Macroglossum fasciatum Swainson, 1823; Sesia gehleni Closs, 1922

= Aellopos ceculus =

Species of moth

Aellopos ceculus is a moth of the family Sphingidae.

== Distribution ==
It lives mainly in the northern section of South America but has known to be found as far north as Mexico.

== Description ==
The wingspan is 42–47 mm. It can be distinguished from all other Aellopos species by the yellow median band found on the hindwing upperside.

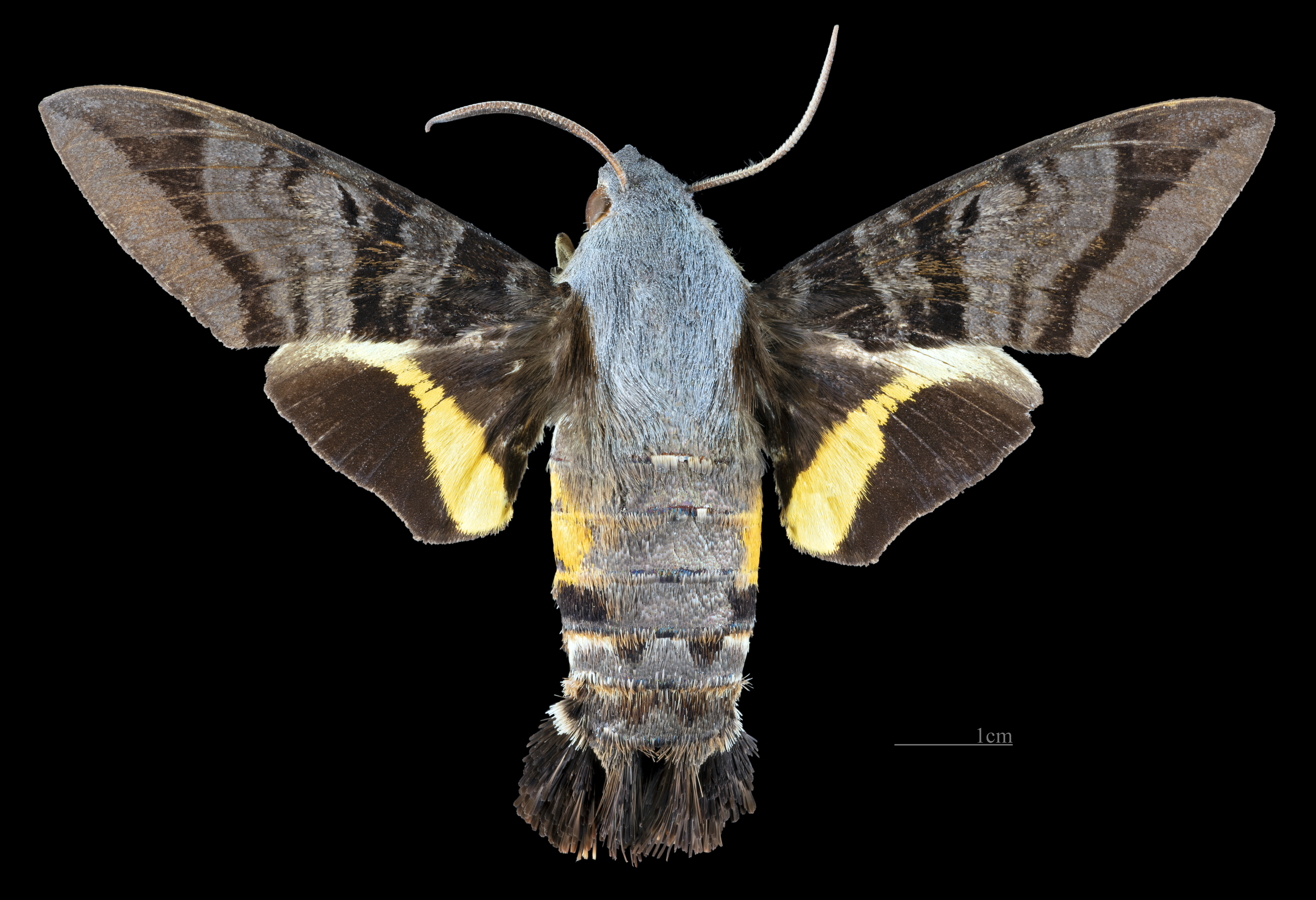
Aellopos ceculus ♂

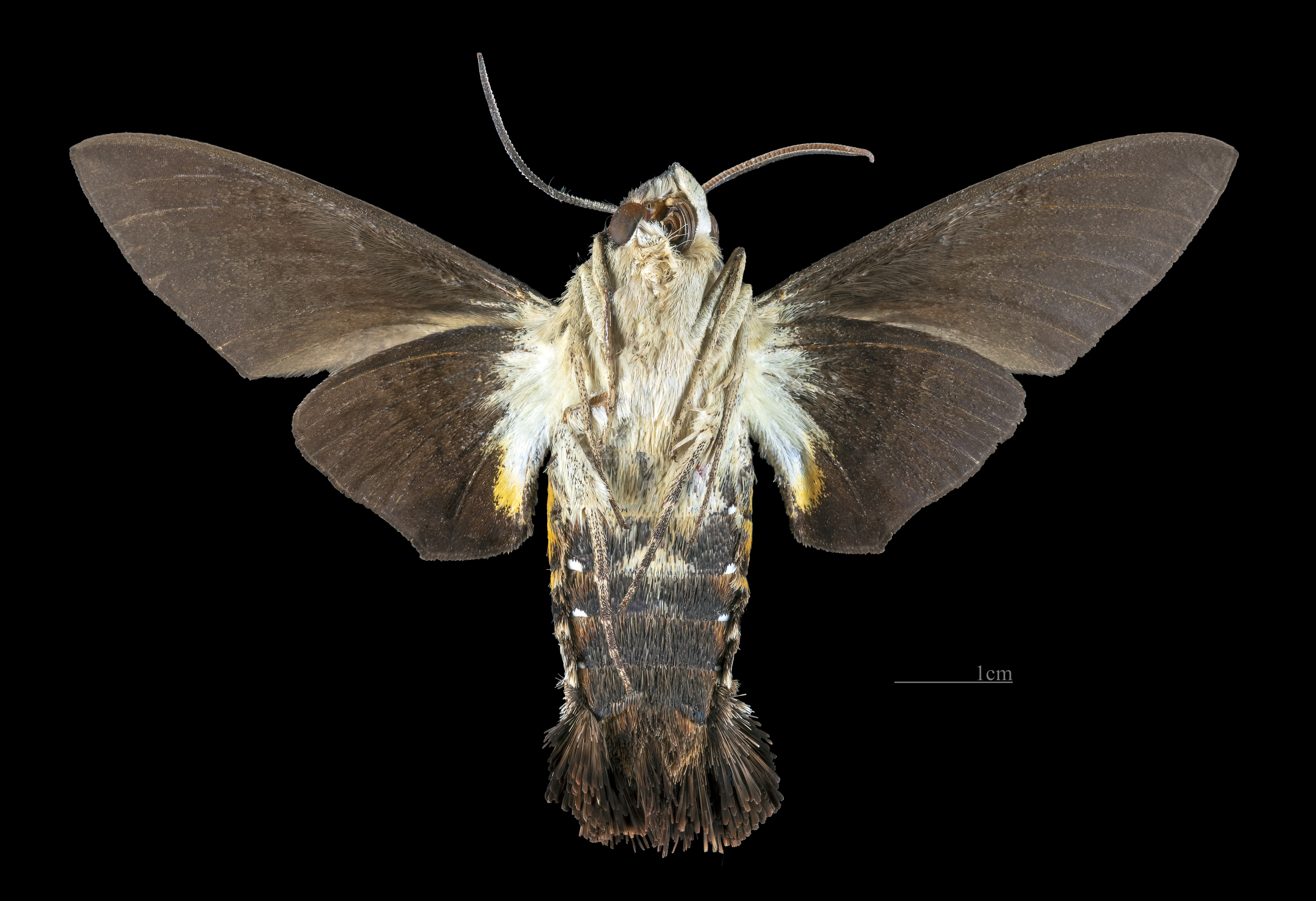
Aellopos ceculus ♂ △

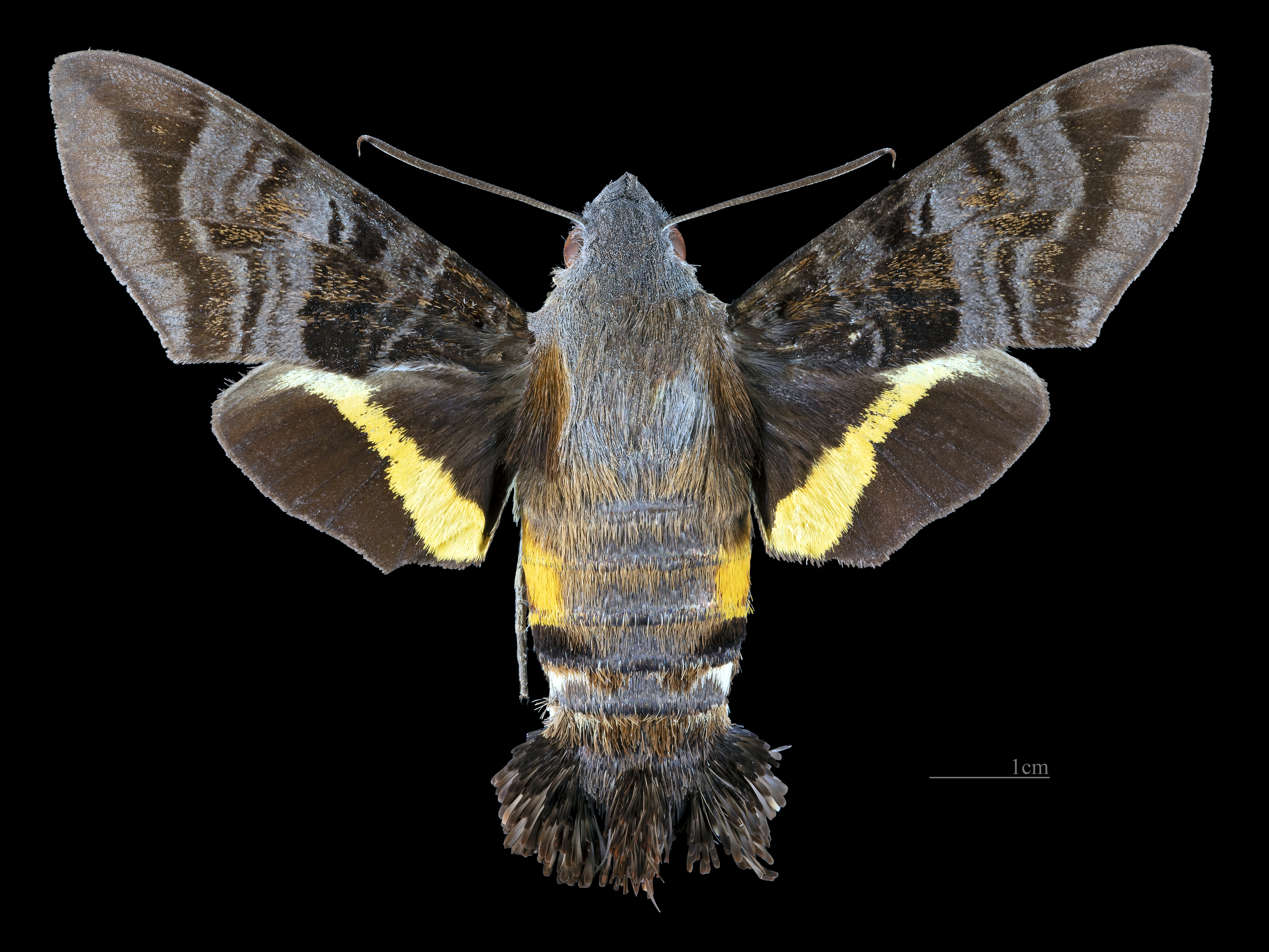
Aellopos ceculus ♀

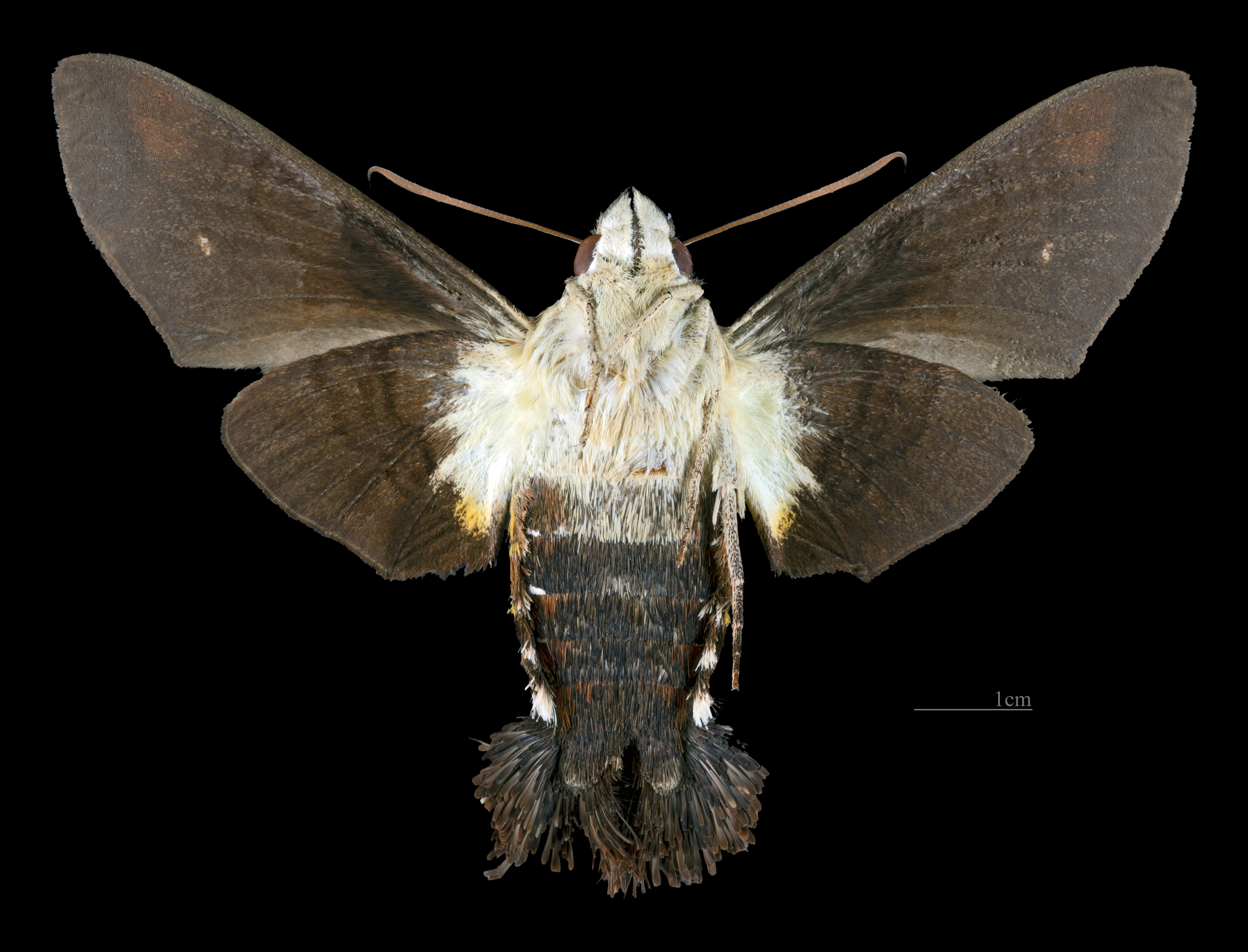
Aellopos ceculus ♀ △

== Biology ==
Adults are on wing year round in Costa Rica. There are probably three main generations, with adults on wing from December to January, April to May and in September.

The larvae feed on various Rubiaceae species.
