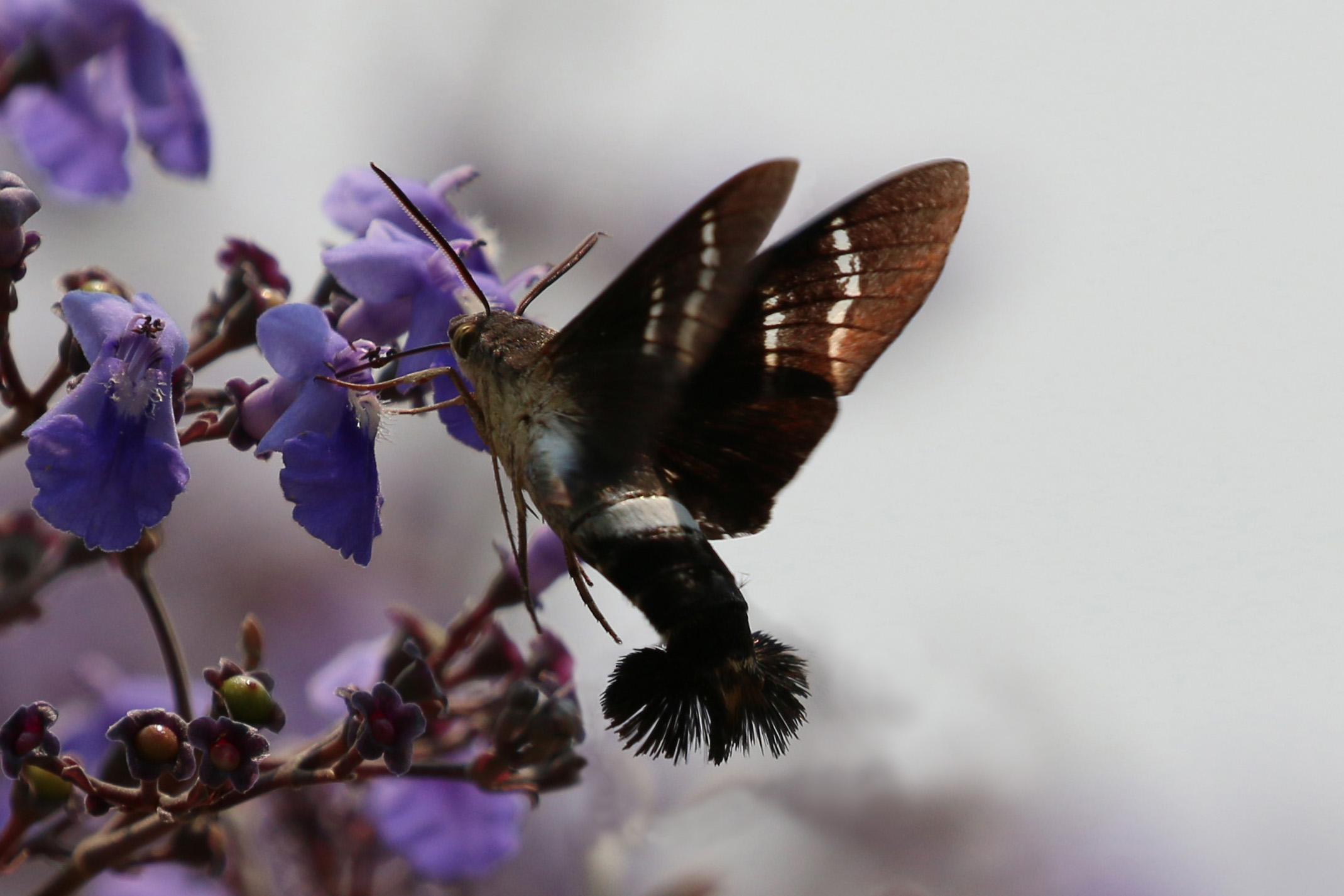
- A. titan titan in flight The Pantanal, Brazil

Scientific classification
- Kingdom: Animalia
- Phylum: Arthropoda
- Clade: Pancrustacea
- Class: Insecta
- Order: Lepidoptera
- Family: Sphingidae
- Subtribe: Dilophonotina
- Genus: Aellopos; Hübner, [1819]

= Aellopos =

Genus of moths

The genus Aellopos consists of large day-flying moths in the family Sphingidae. It was first described by Jacob Hübner in 1819. Species in this genus occur from Maine in the United States through Central America and down to Argentina and Uruguay in South America.

== Species ==
- Aellopos blaini (Herrich-Schaffer, 1869)
- Aellopos ceculus (Cramer, 1777)
- Aellopos clavipes (Rothschild & Jordan, 1903) – clavipes sphinx moth
- Aellopos fadus (Cramer, 1775) – Fadus sphinx moth
- Aellopos tantalus (Linnaeus, 1758) – Tantalus sphinx moth
- Aellopos titan (Cramer, 1777) – Titan sphinx moth
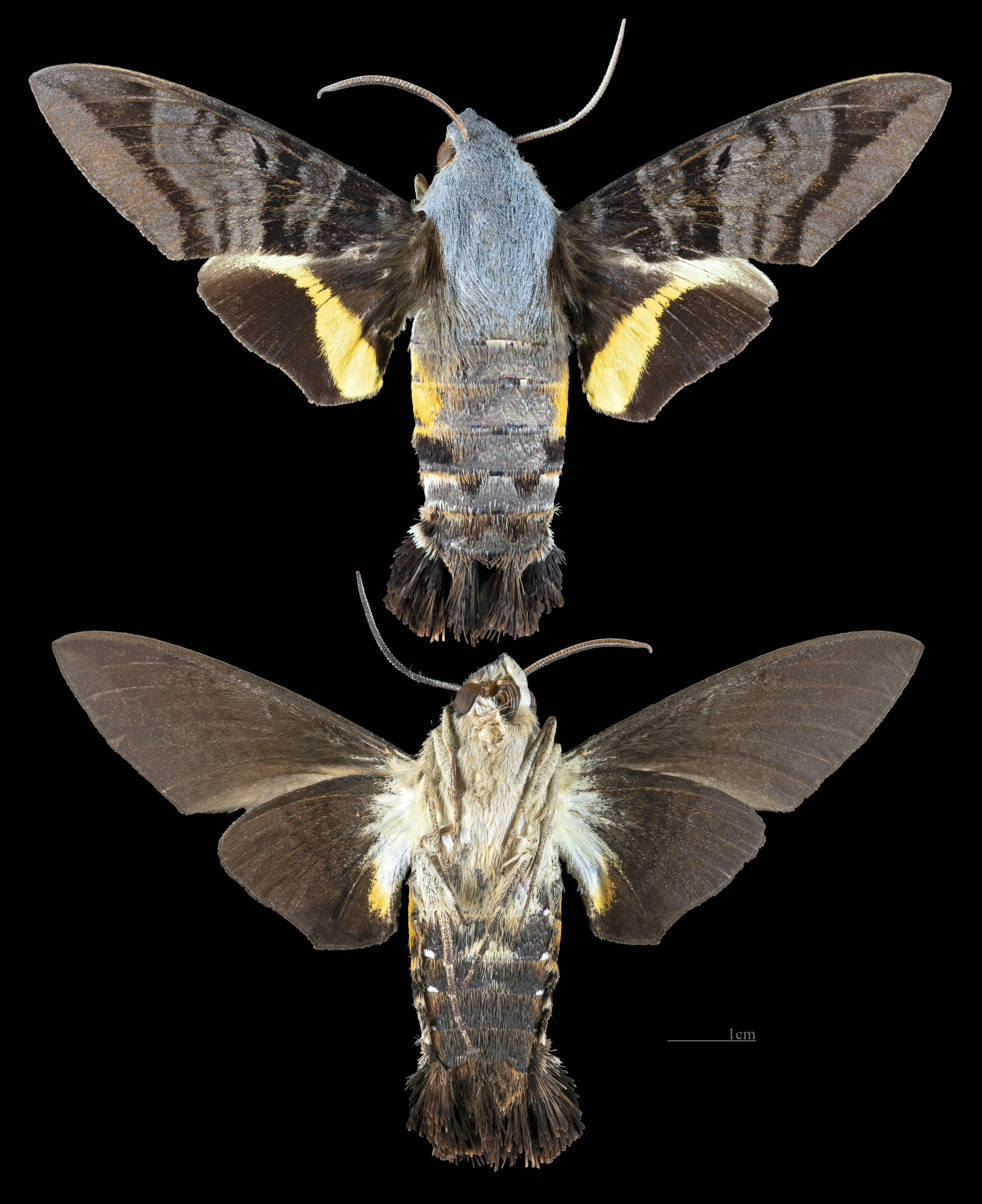
Aellopos ceculus

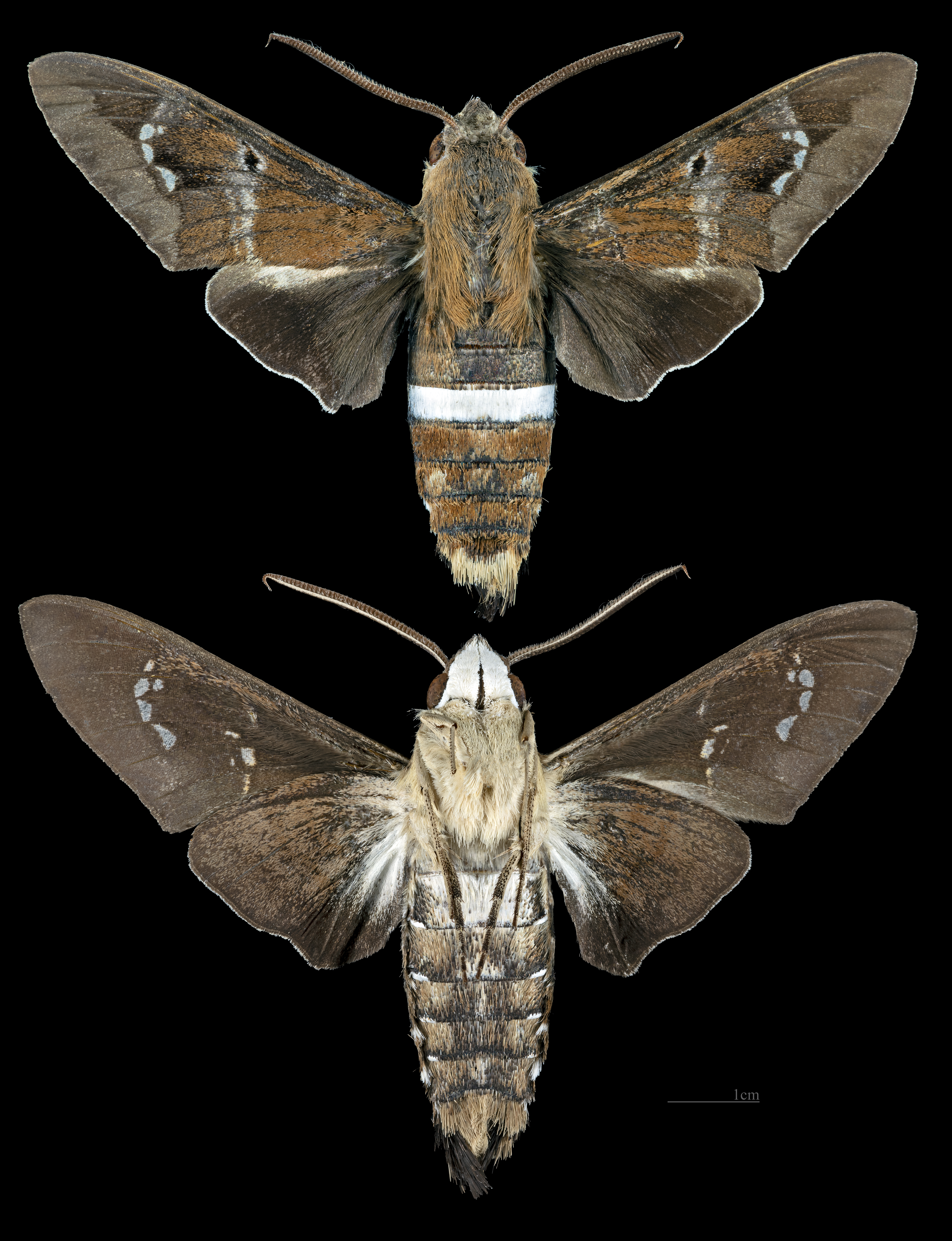
Aellopos clavipes

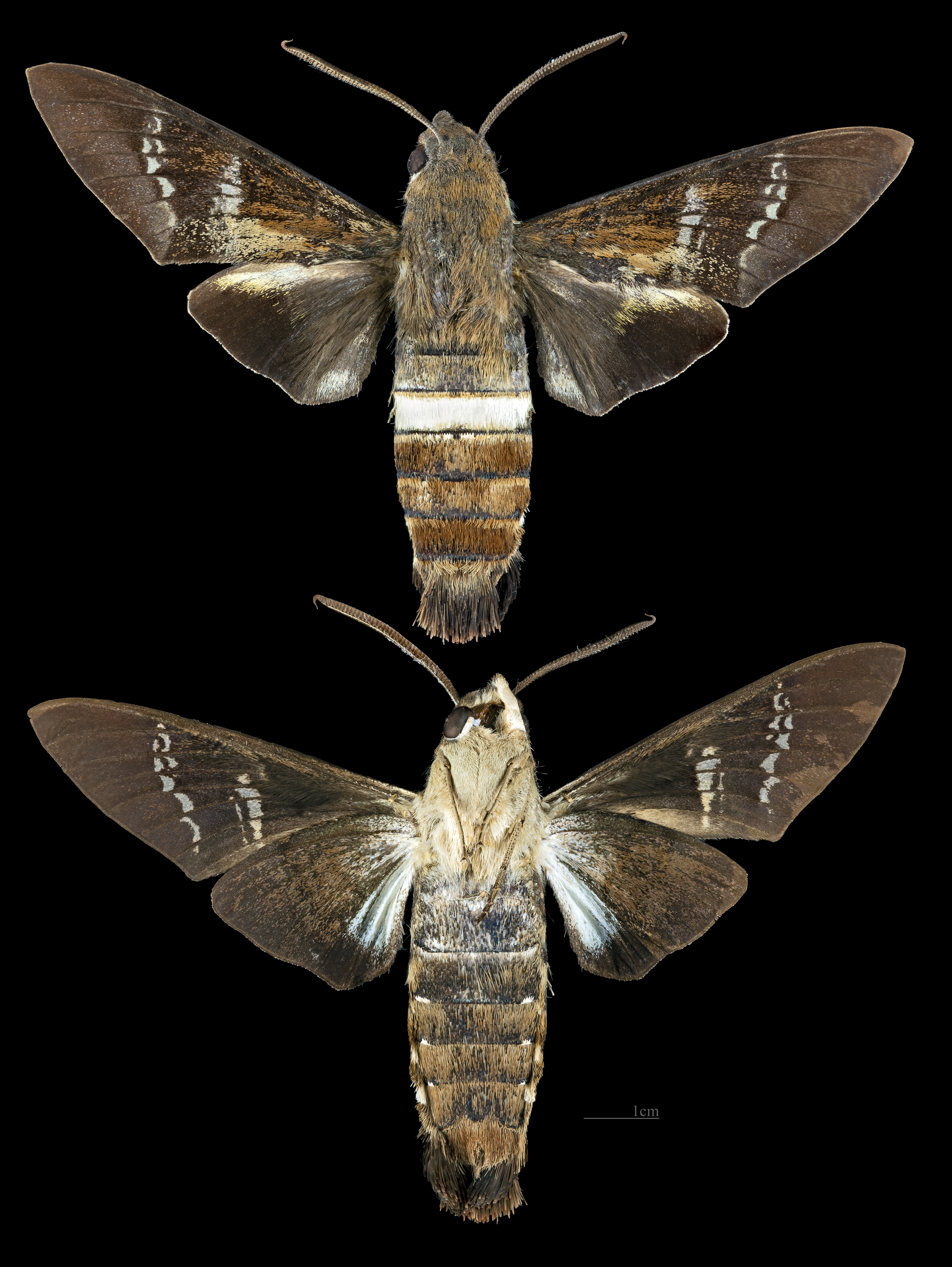
Aellopos fadus

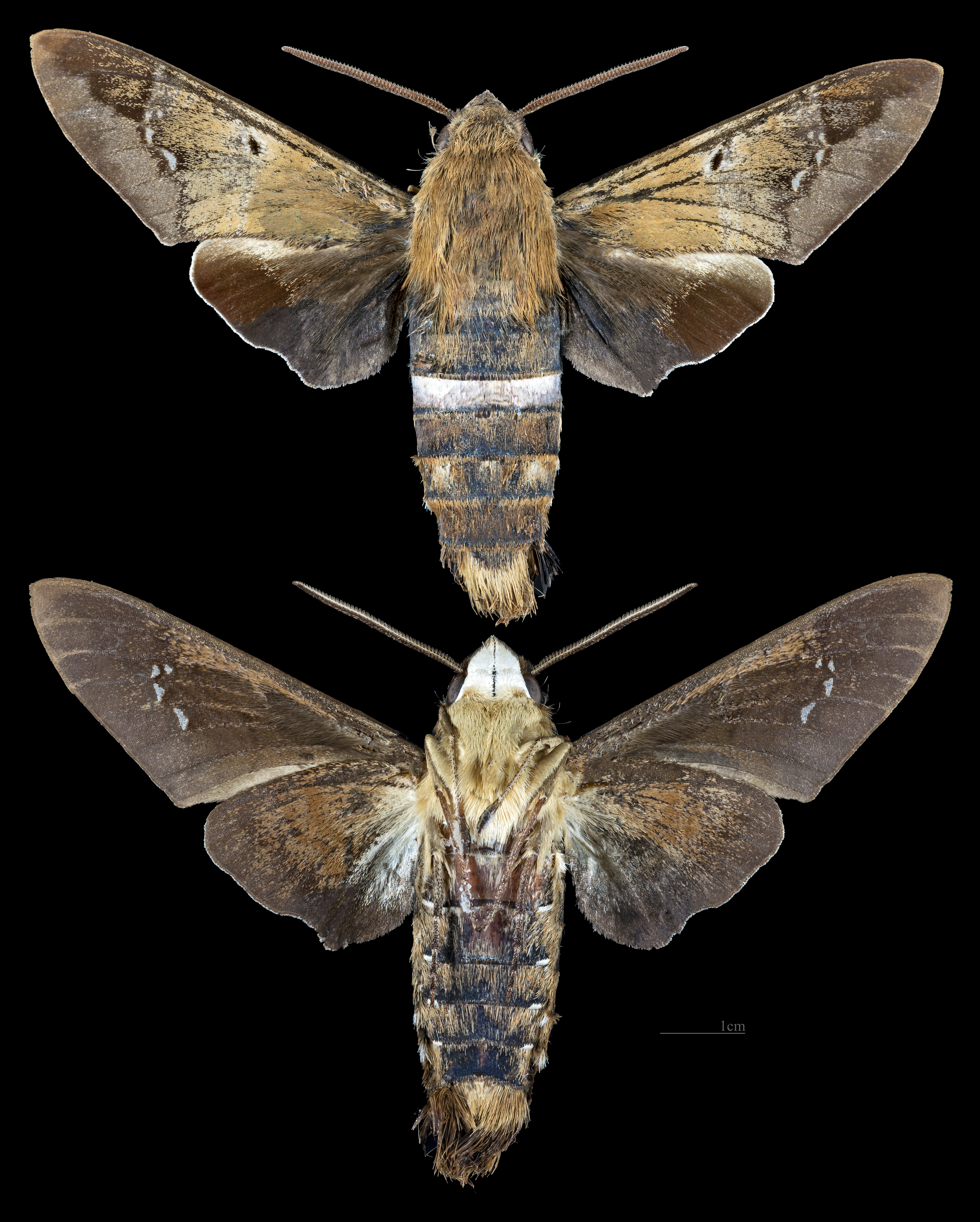
Aellopos tantalus

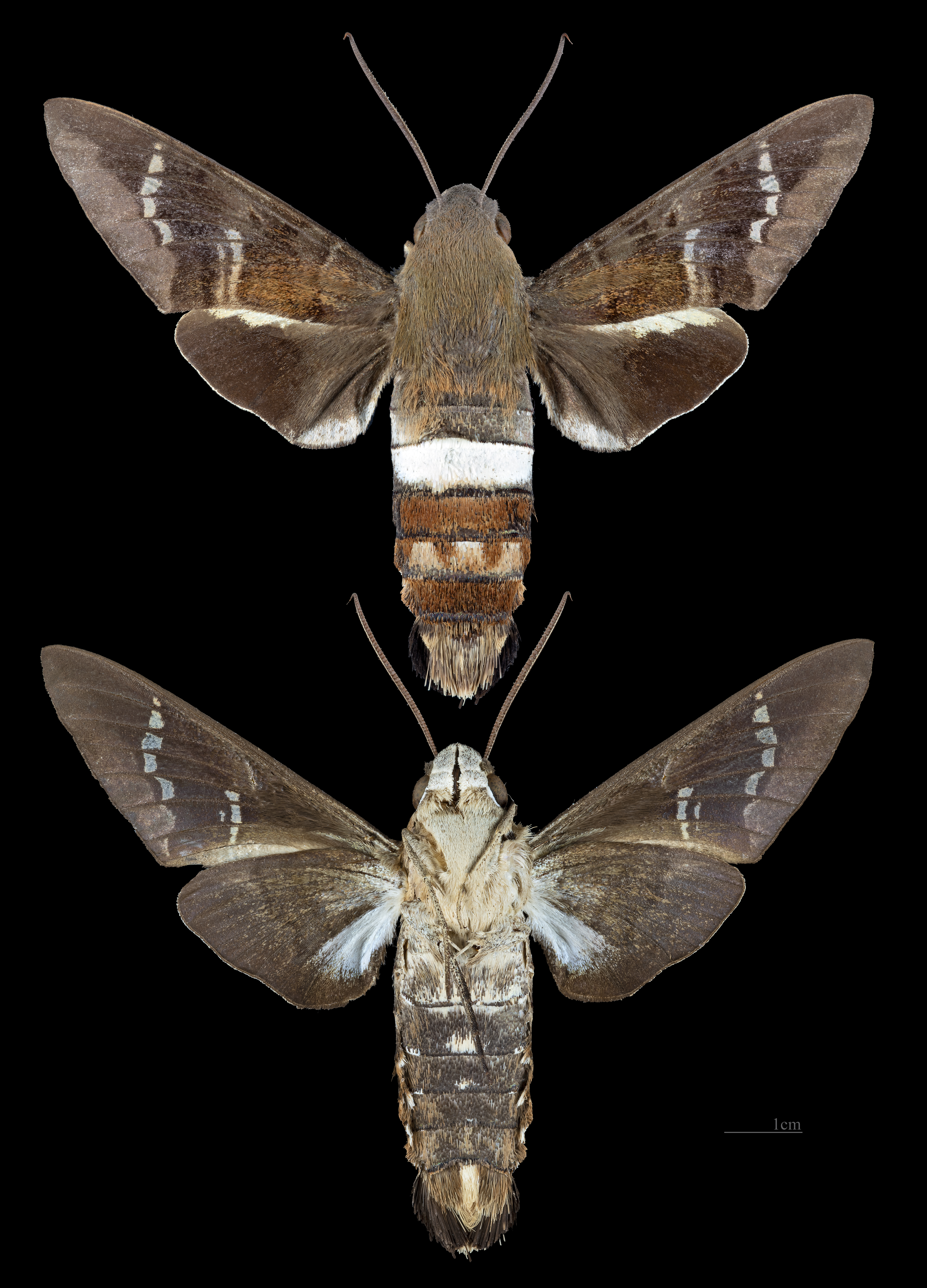
Aellopos titan
