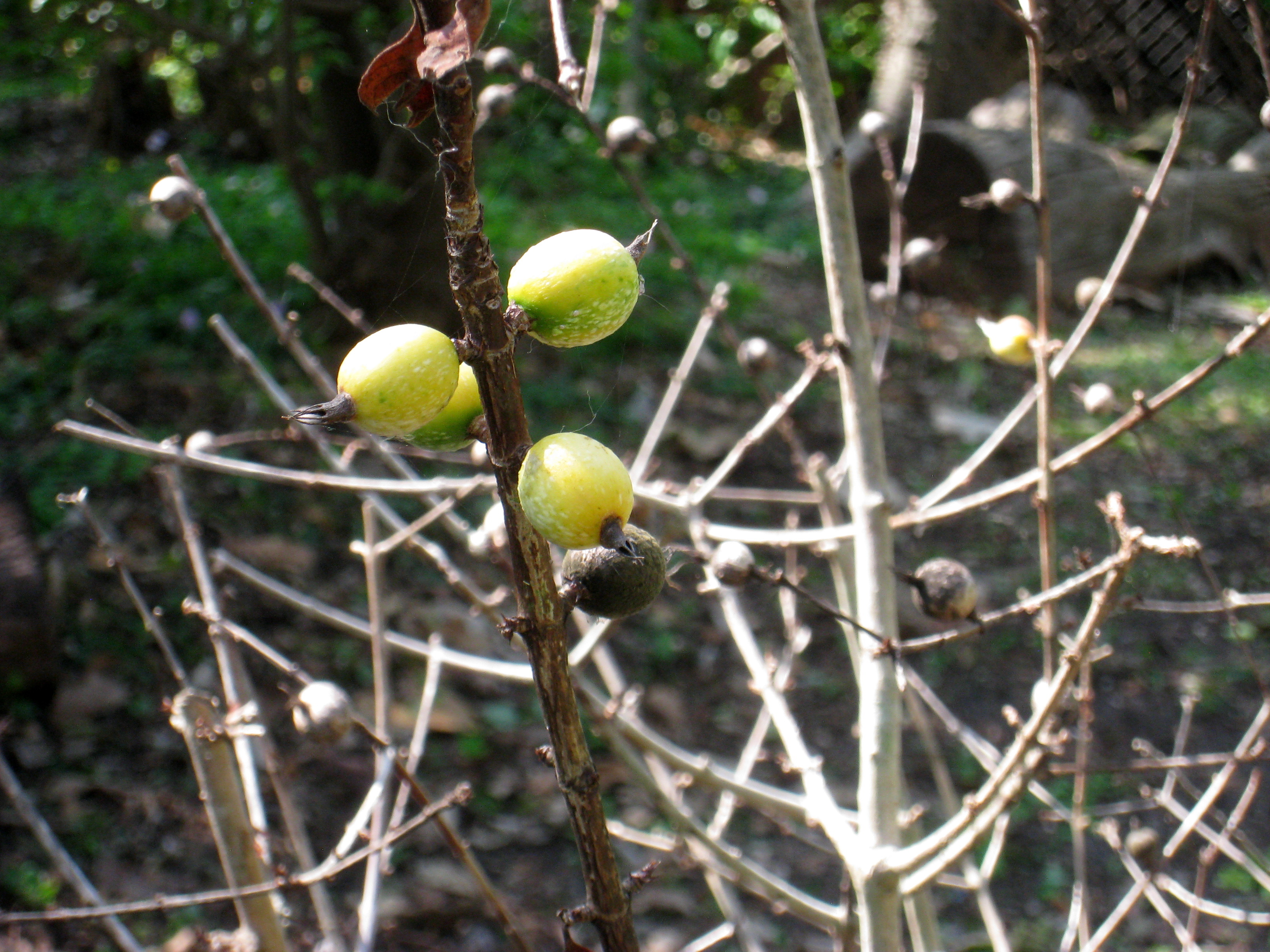

Scientific classification
- Kingdom: Plantae
- Clade: Embryophytes
- Clade: Tracheophytes
- Clade: Angiosperms
- Clade: Eudicots
- Clade: Asterids
- Order: Gentianales
- Family: Rubiaceae
- Genus: Rosenbergiodendron
- Species: R. formosum

Binomial name
- Rosenbergiodendron formosum (Jacq.) Fagerl.

Synonyms
- Gardenia mussaenda L.f. Mussaenda formosa Jacq. Randia formosa (Jacq.) K. Schum. Randia mussaenda (L.f.) DC.

= Rosenbergiodendron formosum =

Species of plant

Rosenbergiodendron formosum is a species of flowering plant in the madder and coffee family, Rubiaceae, and is native to Panama, Colombia, Venezuela, and Ecuador.

Common names include blackberry jam fruit, raspberry bush, and jasmin de rosa.

== Description ==
Rosenbergiodendron formosum grows as small evergreen bush-shrubs, usually only to a height of 4–5 feet tall if planted in the ground or 3–4 feet if planted in a container. It can also be physically transformed into a miniature tree known as a bonsai.

This plant, closely related to the Gardenia, produces white flowers that are 1.5–2 inches in diameter. The flowers are star shaped, tubular, very fragrant and tend to attract nocturnal moths.

The olive-shaped yellow fruits are wood shelled, about 1 inch in diameter, and look like small loquats. They can be easily crushed when chewed. The fruit contains two cells with small flat seeds surrounded by sweet, black, soft pulp that tastes like blackberry jam.
