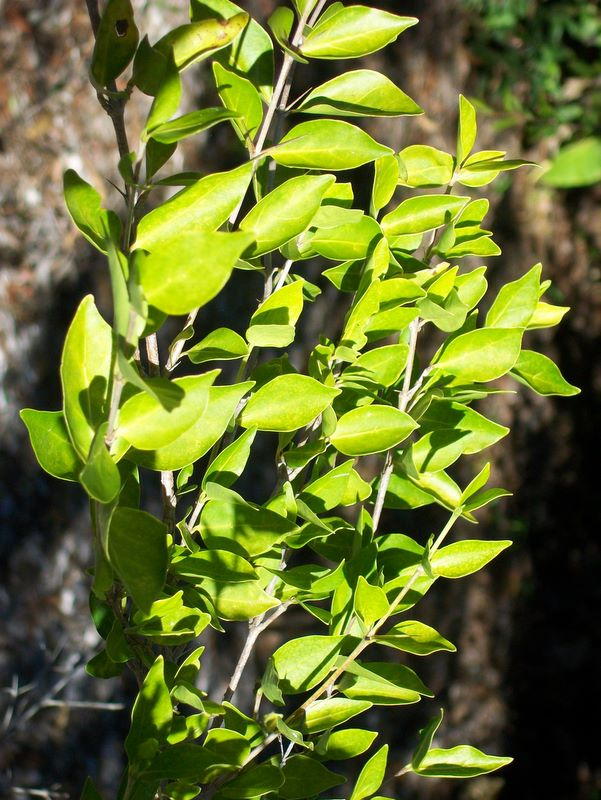

Conservation status
- Endangered (EPBC Act)

Scientific classification
- Kingdom: Plantae
- Clade: Tracheophytes
- Clade: Angiosperms
- Clade: Eudicots
- Clade: Asterids
- Order: Gentianales
- Family: Rubiaceae
- Genus: Randia
- Species: R. moorei

Binomial name
- Randia moorei F.Muell. ex Benth

Synonyms
- _{Xeromphis sp. sensu Harden}

= Randia moorei =

Spiny gardenia

Species of plant

Randia moorei, commonly known as the spiny gardenia, is a rare Australian shrub growing in the far north eastern areas of the state of New South Wales and adjacent areas in Queensland. The habitat is subtropical rainforest north of Lismore.

Randia moorei was described by George Bentham in his Flora Australiensis in 1867. It is one of many plants named in honour of Charles Moore. Unlike several other Australian species, it was not transferred to the genus Atractocarpus, and remains in the genus Randia, historically a wastebasket taxon for the time being. New South Wales botanist Gwen Harden classified it in the genus Xeromphis.

Growing as a shrub or small tree, Randia moorei reaches 8 m (25 ft) in height. Its roots can sucker if disturbed. There are often spines on the stems. Broadly oval, the leaves measure 2–6 cm (0.8–2.4 in) in length by 1–3 cm (0.4–1.4 in) wide, with a narrow tip. present. The fragrant flowers occur in groups of three at the ends or on the side of branchlets, and are followed by a round golden berry, measuring 0.6–0.9 cm long.

Randia moorei is found on basalt soils from Lismore in northern New South Wales north into the Gold Coast Hinterland. It is found in subtropical dry rainforest as an understory plant under hoop pine (Araucaria cunninghamii) and brush box (Lophostemon confertus), often along watercourses. Much of its habitat has been cleared for urban and agricultural development, such as banana plantations, as well as clearing for upgrading of the Pacific Highway.

To complicate matters, the spiny gardenia resembles the Cockspur Vine (Maclura cochinchinensis) and invasive small-leaved privet (Ligustrum sinense), so inadvertent removal is possible.
