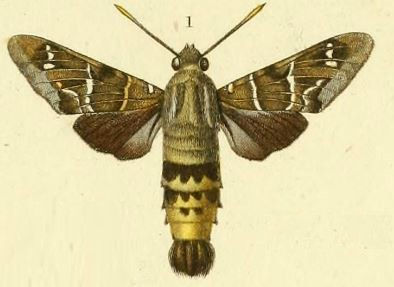

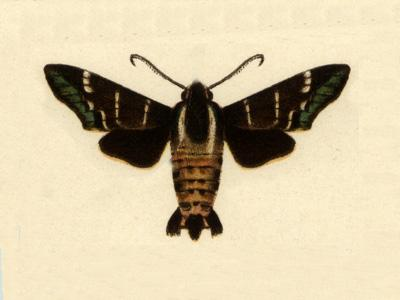

Scientific classification
- Kingdom: Animalia
- Phylum: Arthropoda
- Class: Insecta
- Order: Lepidoptera
- Family: Sphingidae
- Genus: Aellopos
- Species: A. blaini

Binomial name
- Aellopos blaini Herrich-Schäffer, 1869

Synonyms
- Aellopos aedon Boisduval, 1875; Aellopos blainii Grote, 1870; Macroglossa aedon

= Aellopos blaini =

Species of moth

Aellopos blaini is a moth of the family Sphingidae. It is found in Cuba, Jamaica, Hispaniola and Puerto Rico.

It can be distinguished from all other Aellopos species with an entirely black hindwing upperside by the lack of a transverse white band on abdominal tergite four. The hindwing upperside is entirely black.

The larvae feed on Rubiaceae species.
