= Rosenbergiodendron longiflorum =

Conservation status
- Least Concern (IUCN 3.1)

Scientific classification
- Kingdom: Plantae
- Clade: Tracheophytes
- Clade: Angiosperms
- Clade: Eudicots
- Clade: Asterids
- Order: Gentianales
- Family: Rubiaceae
- Genus: Rosenbergiodendron
- Species: R. longiflorum

Binomial name
- Rosenbergiodendron longiflorum (Ruiz & Pav.) Fagerl.

Synonyms
- Basanacantha macrocarpa Rusby; Gardenia longiflora Ruiz & Pav.; Randia formosa var. longiflora (Ruiz & Pav.) K.Schum.; Randia ruiziana DC.; Randia speciosa DC.; Randia williamsii Standl.; Solena ruiziana (DC.) D.Dietr.; Solena speciosa (DC.) D.Dietr.

Species of plant

Rosenbergiodendron longiflorum is a flowering plant in the family Rubiaceae. It is native to tropical South America.
