= Randia armata =

Conservation status
- Least Concern (IUCN 3.1)

Scientific classification
- Kingdom: Plantae
- Clade: Tracheophytes
- Clade: Angiosperms
- Clade: Eudicots
- Clade: Asterids
- Order: Gentianales
- Family: Rubiaceae
- Genus: Randia
- Species: R. armata

Binomial name
- Randia armata (Sw.) DC.

Subspecies
- Randia armata subsp. armata; Randia armata subsp. panamensis (Standl.) Lorence

Synonyms
- Basanacantha armata (Sw.) Ernst; Gardenia armata Sw.; Solena armata (Sw.) D.Dietr.

Species of flowering plant

Randia armata, also known as cruceta, epsinho de judeu, or esporão de galo, is a species of plant in the family Rubiaceae. It is a shrub or tree native to Mexico and tropical America.

== Description ==
Randia armata is small, growing up to 10 m (33 ft) tall, and often branches near the ground. The branches have sharp spines that grow in opposite pairs, as well as scars from stipules falling off, and the bark is green or cream in color. It has simple, opposite leaves that drop briefly in the dry season. When they grow back, flowers are also produced. These flowers are long, white tubes that grow alone at the end of branches. Synchronous flowering is common.

The fruit is large, smooth, and spherical. It starts green and matures into yellow late in the wet season.

Flower

Ripe fruit

Immature fruit

Seeds

== Distribution and habitat ==
Randia armata grows in forests in wet, tropical biomes.

== Uses ==
Randia armata may be used as medicine or as food for both animals and humans.
