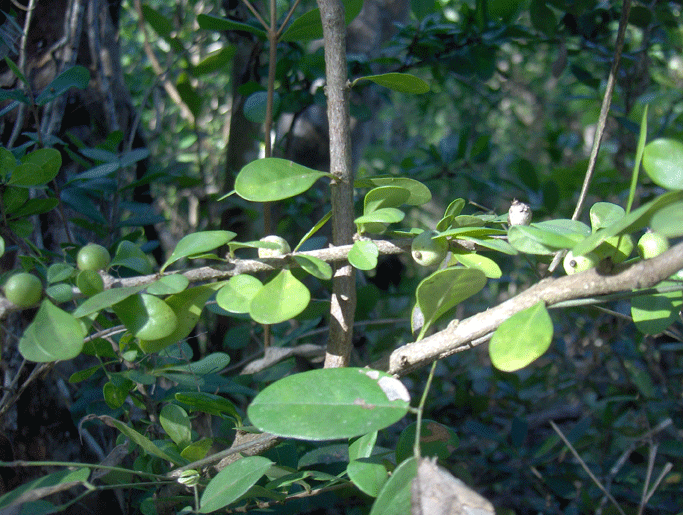

Conservation status
- Least Concern (IUCN 3.1)

Scientific classification
- Kingdom: Plantae
- Clade: Tracheophytes
- Clade: Angiosperms
- Clade: Eudicots
- Clade: Asterids
- Order: Gentianales
- Family: Rubiaceae
- Genus: Randia
- Species: R. aculeata

Binomial name
- Randia aculeata L.

Synonyms
- Gardenia randia Sw.; Randia aculeata var. mitis (L.) Griseb.; Randia latifolia Lam.; Randia mitis L.

= Randia aculeata =

Species of plant

Randia aculeata, commonly known as white indigoberry or white indigo berry, is a species in the Rubiaceae. It is a shrub or small tree that grows from 2 to 6 m tall. R. aculeata is native to Florida, Bermuda, the Bahamas, elsewhere among the Caribbean islands, and also from Mexico, Puerto Rico south through Central and South America to Colombia.
