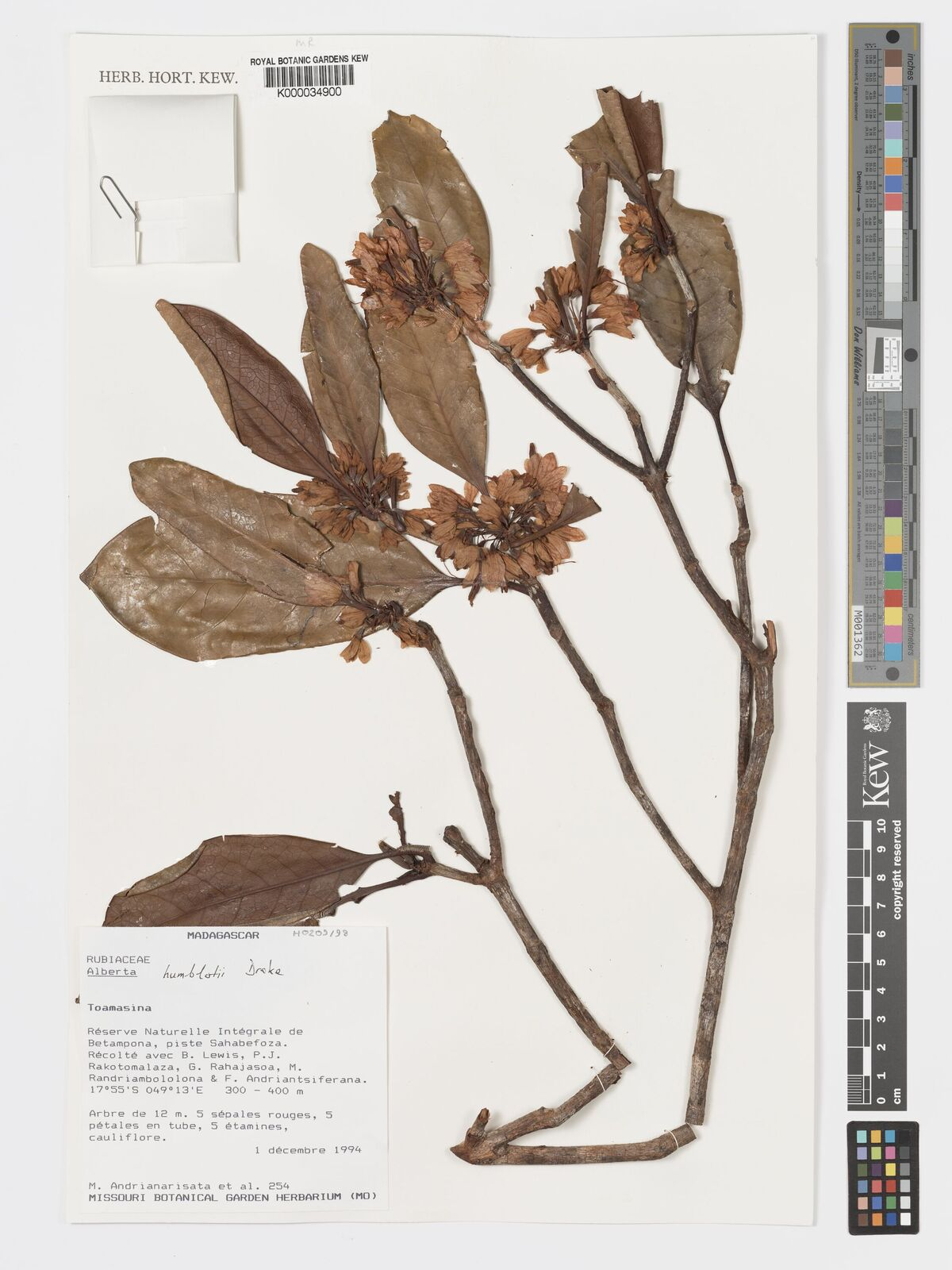

Conservation status
- Least Concern (IUCN 3.1)

Scientific classification
- Kingdom: Plantae
- Clade: Tracheophytes
- Clade: Angiosperms
- Clade: Eudicots
- Clade: Asterids
- Order: Gentianales
- Family: Rubiaceae
- Genus: Razafimandimbisonia
- Species: R. humblotii

Binomial name
- Razafimandimbisonia humblotii (Drake) Kainul. & B.Bremer

Synonyms
- Alberta humblotii Drake; Alberta humblotii var. obovata Cavaco

= Razafimandimbisonia humblotii =

Species of flowering plant

Razafimandimbisonia humblotii is a species of flowering plant in the family Rubiaceae. It is a tree native to Madagascar. Its IUCN conservation status is Least Concern.

== Taxonomy ==
Emmanuel Drake del Castillo described Razafimandimbisonia humblotii in 1897, and placed it in the genus Alberta. In 1968, Alberto Cavaco named the species Alberta humblotii var. obovata.

In 2009, Kent Kainulainen and Birgitta Bremer created the genus Razafimandimbisonia, moving R. humblotii and four other species into it.

== Distribution ==
Razafimandimbisonia humblotii is native to central and eastern Madagascar. It is endemic to Madagscar, and is present in Antsiranana Province, Fianarantsoa Province, and Toamasina Province.

The species grows in the seasonally dry tropical biome, in moist montane forests and rainforests. It is present at altitudes of 170–2,195 metres (558–7,201 ft). The species occupies an area of around 64 square kilometres (25 sq mi), though this may be a significant underestimate. There are at least twelve subpopulations.

== Description ==
Razafimandimbisonia humblotii is a tree up to 15 metres (49 ft) high. The leaves are leathery and persistent. The fruits are dehiscent.

== Conservation ==
In 2019, the IUCN assessed Razafimandimbisonia humblotii as of Least Concern. It is present in ten protected areas, including Andringitra National Park and Mananara-Nord National Park. The species is threatened by habitat loss, which may be caused by logging and fire.
