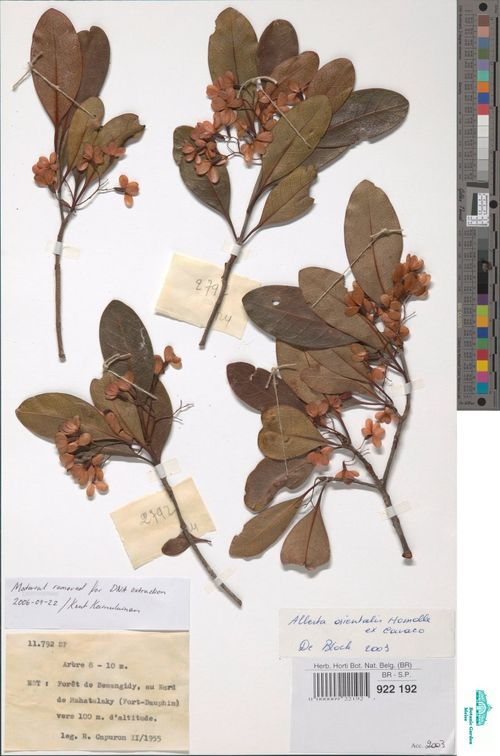

Conservation status
- Vulnerable (IUCN 3.1)

Scientific classification
- Kingdom: Plantae
- Clade: Embryophytes
- Clade: Tracheophytes
- Clade: Spermatophytes
- Clade: Angiosperms
- Clade: Eudicots
- Clade: Asterids
- Order: Gentianales
- Family: Rubiaceae
- Genus: Razafimandimbisonia
- Species: R. orientalis

Binomial name
- Razafimandimbisonia orientalis (Homolle ex Cavaco) Kainul. & B.Bremer

Synonyms
- Alberta orientalis Homolle ex Cavaco

= Razafimandimbisonia orientalis =

Species of flowering plant

Razafimandimbisonia orientalis is a species of flowering plant in the family Rubiaceae. It is a tree endemic to Madagascar.

The species was described in 1965, and moved to its current genus in 2009. The IUCN classifies Razafimandimbisonia orientalis as Vulnerable.

== Taxonomy ==
Razafimandimbisonia orientalis was first validly published in 1965, by Anne-Marie Homolle. It was initially classified in the genus Alberta. In 2009, the species was moved to the newly created genus Razafimandimbisonia, along with four other species.

== Distribution ==
It is native to the seasonally dry tropical biome of south-east Madagascar. It is endemic to Madagascar, and occurs in Fianarantsoa Province and Toliara Province. Its extent of occurrence is around 13,268 square kilometres (5,123 sq mi).

Razafimandimbisonia orientalis occurs in humid and coastal forests. It grows in rocky and sandy soils. It is found at elevations of 7–1,972 metres (20–6,470 ft).

Type material has been collected near the Mananjary River, in Vatovavy.

== Description ==
Razafimandimbisonia orientalis is a tree that grows up to 10 metres (33 ft) tall.

== Conservation ==
In 2019, the IUCN assessed Razafimandimbisonia orientalis as vulnerable. It is at risk from habitat loss due to fire, mining, and deforestation. The species occurs in two protected areas (Tsitongambarika and Ankarabolava).
