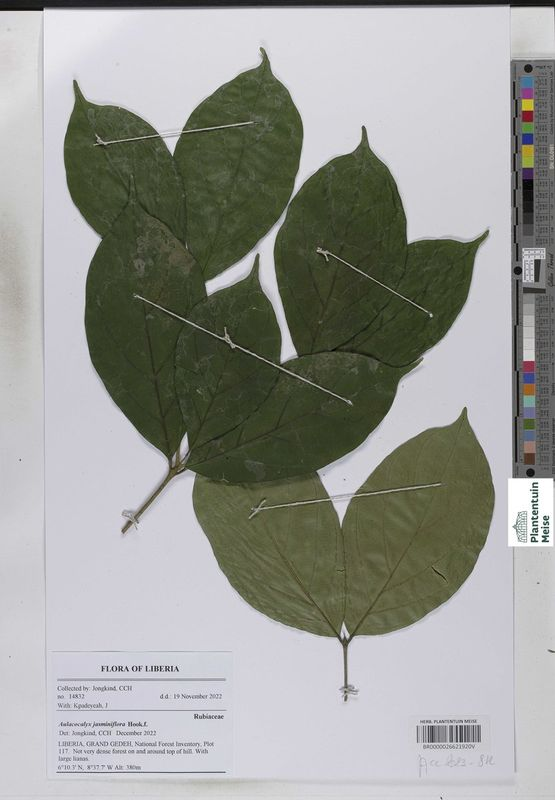
- Aulacocalyx jasminiflora

Scientific classification
- Kingdom: Plantae
- Clade: Embryophytes
- Clade: Tracheophytes
- Clade: Angiosperms
- Clade: Eudicots
- Clade: Asterids
- Order: Gentianales
- Family: Rubiaceae
- Subfamily: Ixoroideae
- Tribe: Gardenieae
- Genus: Aulacocalyx; Hook.f.

Type species
- Aulacocalyx jasminiflora Hook.f.

Synonyms
- Dorothea Wernham

= Aulacocalyx =

Genus of plants

Aulacocalyx is a genus of flowering plants in the family Rubiaceae. Aulacocalyx are shrubs or trees, which normally have white flowers. The genus is found in tropical Africa.

Aulacocalyx was described in 1873, and has eleven species.

== Taxonomy ==
Joseph Dalton Hooker described Aulacocalyx in 1873. He placed it in the tribe Alberteae, as he believed it to have one ovule in each locule. Ronald William John Keay later moved it to the tribe Gardenieae, after recognising that it had multiple ovules in each locule. In 1986, it was moved to its own tribe, Aulacocalyceae.

In 1958, the genus Dorothea was synonymised with Aulacocalyx. Heinsenia was formerly considered a subgenus of Aulacocalyx.

== Species ==
Eleven species are accepted as of July 2026.

- Aulacocalyx camerooniana Sonké & S.E.Dawson - Cameroon
- Aulacocalyx caudata (Hiern) Keay - Nigeria, Cameroon, Gabon, Equatorial Guinea
- Aulacocalyx divergens (Hutch. & Dalziel) Keay - Ghana, Guinée, Liberia, Sierra Leone
- Aulacocalyx jasminiflora Hook.f. - widespread from Liberia to Zambia
  - Aulacocalyx jasminiflora subsp. jasminiflora
  - Aulacocalyx jasminiflora subsp. kivuensis E.Figueiredo - eastern Zaire (Congo-Kinshasa)
- Aulacocalyx lamprophylla K.Krause - Cameroon
- Aulacocalyx laxiflora E.M.A.Petit - Tanzania, Zambia, Zaire (Congo-Kinshasa)
- Aulacocalyx lujae De Wild. - Congo-Brazzaville, Zaire (Congo-Kinshasa)
- Aulacocalyx mapiana (Hiern) Bridson & Figueiredo - Cameroon
- Aulacocalyx pallens (Hiern) Bridson& Figueiredo - Gabon, São Tomé and Príncipe, Zaire (Congo-Kinshasa)
  - Aulacocalyx pallens subsp. letestui (Pellegr.) Figueiredo - Gabon, Zaire (Congo-Kinshasa)
  - Aulacocalyx pallens subsp. pallens - São Tomé and Príncipe
- Aulacocalyx subulata (N.Hallé) Figueiredo - Gabon
  - Aulacocalyx subulata subsp. glabra Figueiredo
  - Aulacocalyx subulata subsp. subulata
- Aulacocalyx talbotii (Wernham) Keay - Nigeria, Cameroon, Gabon, Congo-Brazzaville

== Distribution ==
Aulacocalyx is found in West Africa, including São Tomé. Most species are found in the Guineo-Congolian rainforests, at elevations of up to 1,000 metres (3,300 ft).

== Description ==
Aulacocalyx are shrubs or trees that grows up 18 metres (59 ft) high. The branches are usually striped.

The leaves are arranged oppositely, and have stems. The leaves are elliptical, ovate, or obovate, and sometimes have domatia.

The inflorescence has one to many flowers. The calyx has five lobes. The corolla is usually white, but can be grayish-green or yellow. The corolla usually has five lobes.

The fruit is round, dark brown to black when dry, and has a persistent calyx. The seeds are black when dry.
