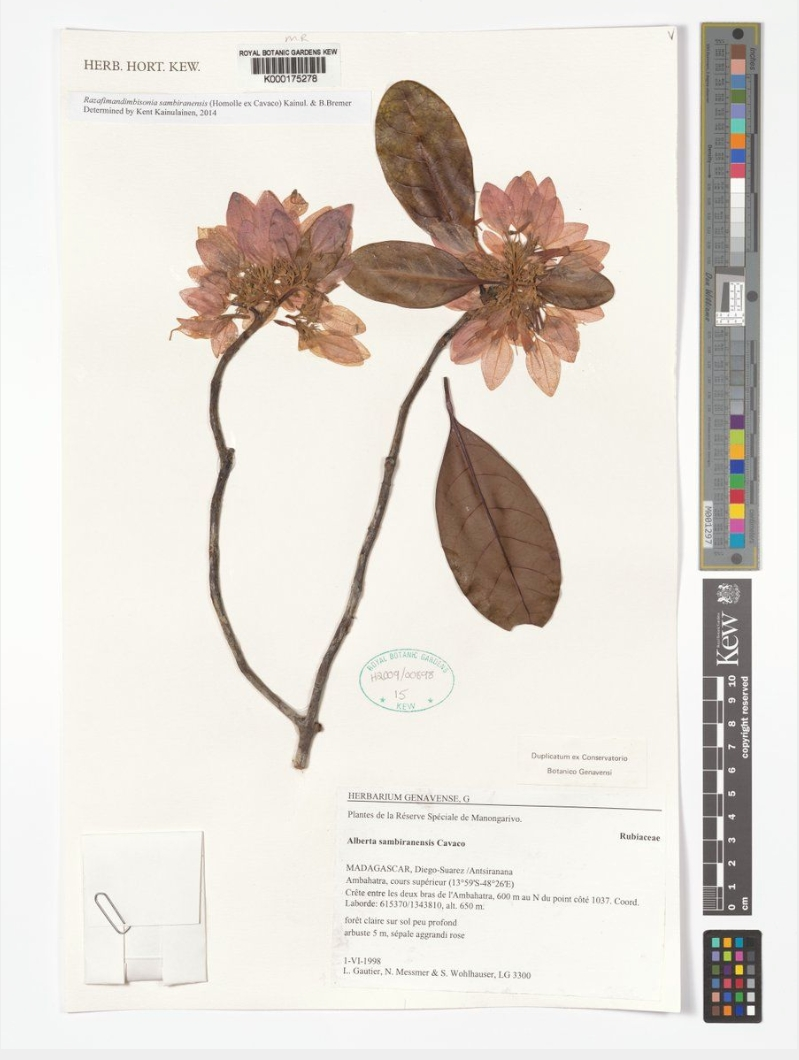

Conservation status
- Least Concern (IUCN 3.1)

Scientific classification
- Kingdom: Plantae
- Clade: Embryophytes
- Clade: Tracheophytes
- Clade: Spermatophytes
- Clade: Angiosperms
- Clade: Eudicots
- Clade: Asterids
- Order: Gentianales
- Family: Rubiaceae
- Genus: Razafimandimbisonia
- Species: R. sambiranensis

Binomial name
- Razafimandimbisonia sambiranensis (Homolle ex Cavaco) Kainul. & B.Bremer

Synonyms
- Alberta sambiranensis Homolle ex Cavaco; Alberta sambiranensis var. australis Cavaco; Alberta sambiranensis var. coriacea Cavaco

= Razafimandimbisonia sambiranensis =

Species of flowering plant

Razafimandimbisonia sambiranensis is a species of flowering plant in the family Rubiaceae. It is a tree native to the humid forests of Madagascar.

The species was described in 1965, and moved to its current genus in 2009. It is listed as a species of least concern by the IUCN.

== Taxonomy ==
The first valid publication of the species was by Alberto Cavaco in 1965, following an invalid publication by Anne-Marie Homolle. In 1968, Cavaco described two varieties: Alberta sambiranensis var. australis and Alberta sambiranensis var. coriacea.

In 2009, Kent Kainulainen and Birgitta Bremer moved the species, along with four others, to the new genus Razafimandimbisonia.

== Distribution ==
Razafimandimbisonia sambiranensis is native to the seasonally dry tropical biome of south-east Madagascar. The species occurs in twenty known locations. Its extent of occurrence is estimated at 191,260 square kilometres (73,850 sq mi), though it may be larger than this.

It grows in humid and subhumid forests, at elevations of 200–1,700 metres (660–5,580 ft).

== Description ==
Razafimandimbisonia sambiranensis is a tree up to 15 metres (49 ft) high. It has dehiscent fruits.

The species has one calycophyll, whereas the other members of Razafimandimbisonia have five.

== Conservation ==
In 2020, the IUCN assessed Razafimandimbisonia sambiranensis as a species of least concern. The species faces no significant threats, though its population size is thought to be decreasing. Its habitat may be affected by logging, agriculture, mining, and fire.

The species occurs in protected areas, including Loky Manambato, the Manongarivo Special Reserve, the Ankeniheny-Zahamena Corridor, and Andringitra National Park.
