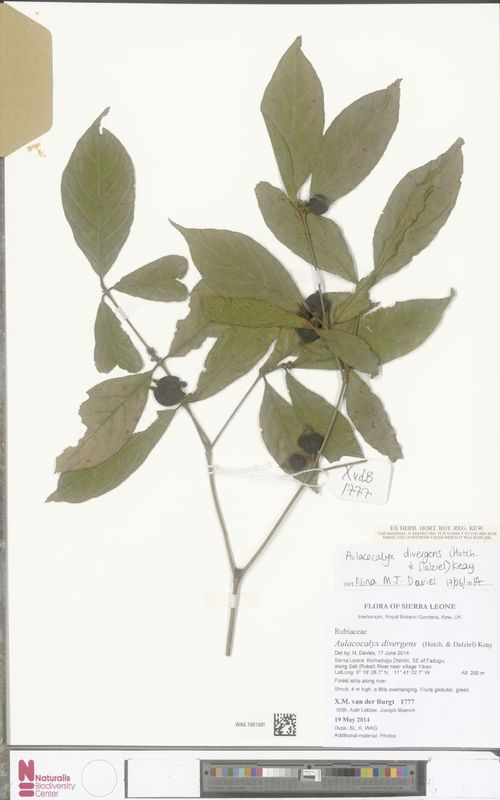

Conservation status
- Vulnerable (IUCN 3.1)

Scientific classification
- Kingdom: Plantae
- Clade: Embryophytes
- Clade: Tracheophytes
- Clade: Angiosperms
- Clade: Eudicots
- Clade: Asterids
- Order: Gentianales
- Family: Rubiaceae
- Genus: Aulacocalyx
- Species: A. divergens

Binomial name
- Aulacocalyx divergens (Hutch. & Dalziel) Keay

Synonyms
- Dorothea divergens Hutch. & Dalziel

= Aulacocalyx divergens =

Species of flowering plant

Aulacocalyx divergens is a species of flowering plant in the family Rubiaceae. It is a shrub or tree with white flowers.

The species is native to the forests of west Africa. It was described in 1931, and is listed as Vulnerable by the IUCN.

== Taxonomy ==
The species was described in 1931, as Dorothea divergens, by John Hutchinson and John McEwan Dalziel. In 1958, Ronald William John Keay described it as Aulacocalyx divergens.

== Distribution ==
Aulacocalyx divergens is native to the wet tropical biomes of Guinea, Liberia, and Sierra Leone. The species may be present in the Ivory Coast, and there is one record from Ghana. Its extent of occurrence is 84,415–170,000 square kilometres (32,593–65,637 sq mi).

Aulacocalyx divergens grows in the understory of primary forests, along rivers and rocky streams, at elevations of 260–977 metres (853–3,205 ft). It is present in gallery forests, the Guinean forest–savanna mosaic, the Western Guinean lowland forests, and the Guinean montane forests. The species is not resistant to fire.

Aulacocalyx divergens is the only Aulacocalyx species found west of the Dahomey Gap.

== Description ==
Aulacocalyx divergens is a shrub or tree that grows 3–25 metres (9.8–82.0 ft) high. The branches are striped.

The leaves are elliptical to oblong, 6.5–10 centimetres (2.6–3.9 in) long, and 3–4 centimetres (1.2–1.6 in) wide. The leaves are dark green to dark brown when dry, and have 2–4 millimetres (0.079–0.157 in) long stems.

The inflorescences grow on 2–4 millimetres (0.079–0.157 in) stems, and usually have two to four flowers. The flower stems are 1–2.5 millimetres (0.039–0.098 in) long. The flowers are white, and have a sickly scent. The calyx tube is 1.5–3 millimetres (0.059–0.118 in) long. The corolla is white, and 2.2–4 centimetres (0.87–1.57 in) long. The corolla has five lobes, 10–18 millimetres (0.39–0.71 in) long, and 3–4 millimetres (0.12–0.16 in) wide.

The fruits are round, black when dry, and 8–12 millimetres (0.31–0.47 in) wide. The seeds are around 6 millimetres (0.24 in) long, and around 2.5 millimetres (0.098 in) wide. The seeds are black when dry.

== Conservation ==
In 2021, the IUCN listed Aulacocalyx divergens as vulnerable. The extent and quality of its habitat are in decline due to slash-and-burn agriculture. The species is found within the Mount Nimba Strict Nature Reserve, and in the Loma Mountains forest reserve.
