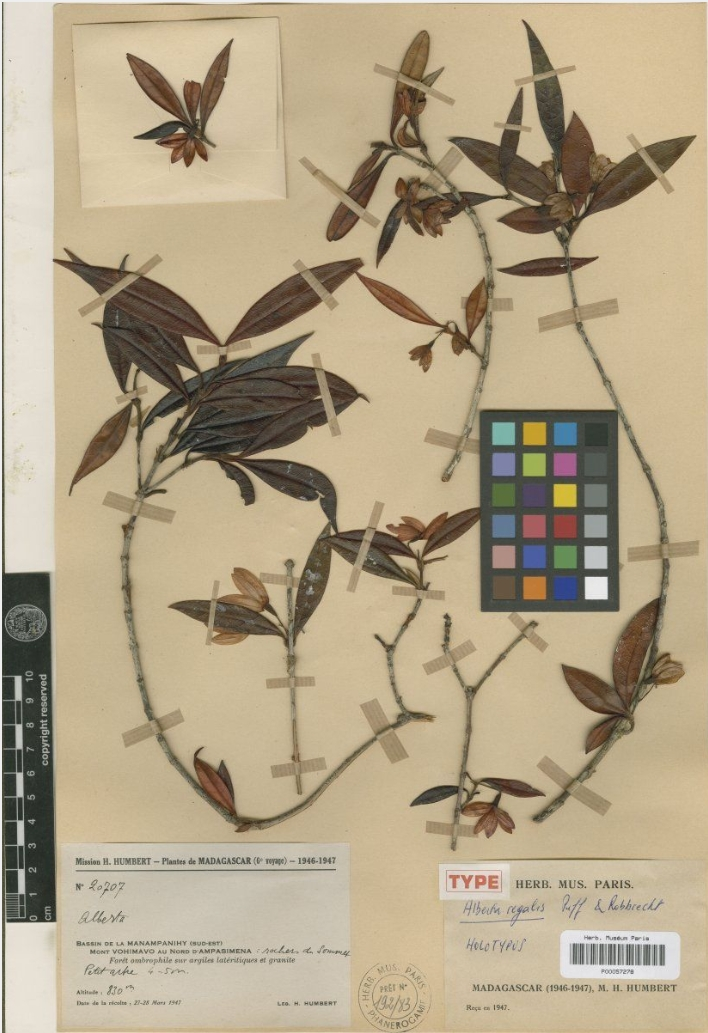

Conservation status
- Critically Endangered (IUCN 3.1)

Scientific classification
- Kingdom: Plantae
- Clade: Tracheophytes
- Clade: Angiosperms
- Clade: Eudicots
- Clade: Asterids
- Order: Gentianales
- Family: Rubiaceae
- Genus: Razafimandimbisonia
- Species: R. regalis

Binomial name
- Razafimandimbisonia regalis (Puff & Robbr.) Kainul. & B.Bremer

Synonyms
- Alberta regalis Puff & Robbr.

= Razafimandimbisonia regalis =

Species of flowering plant

Razafimandimbisonia regalis is a species of flowering plant in the family Rubiaceae. It is a shrub or tree.

Razafimandimbisonia regalis is endemic to a single region of south-east Madagascar. The species was described in 1984. It is classified as Critically Endangered by the IUCN.

== Taxonomy ==
In 1984, Christian Puff and Elmar Robbrecht described the species, placing in the genus Alberta. In 2009, Kent Kainulainen and Birgitta Bremer moved the species to the newly created genus Razafimandimbisonia.

== Distribution ==
Razafimandimbisonia regalis is native to the seasonally dry tropical biome of Mount Vohimavo, in south-east Madagascar. It is found in only one known region, and has an estimated area of occupancy of 4 square kilometres (1.5 sq mi). It is present at elevations of around 830 metres (2,720 ft).

The species occurs in shrublands, on granite, and in humid forests.

== Description ==
Razafimandimbisonia regalis is a shrub or tree. It has dehiscent fruits, and five calycophylls.

== Conservation ==
In 2019, the IUCN assessed Razafimandimbisonia regalis as Critically Endangered. The species is threatened by habitat loss, which may be caused by logging and fire. It is not known to occur in any protected area.
