= Euphorbia rubrostriata =

Conservation status
- Data Deficient (IUCN 3.1)

Scientific classification
- Kingdom: Plantae
- Clade: Tracheophytes
- Clade: Angiosperms
- Clade: Eudicots
- Clade: Rosids
- Order: Malpighiales
- Family: Euphorbiaceae
- Genus: Euphorbia
- Species: E. rubrostriata

Binomial name
- Euphorbia rubrostriata Drake

Synonyms
- Euphorbia mainiana Poiss.

Species of flowering plant

Euphorbia rubrostriata, synonym Euphorbia mainiana, is a species of plant in the family Euphorbiaceae. It is endemic to Madagascar. Its natural habitats are subtropical or tropical dry shrubland and rocky areas. It is threatened by habitat loss.

== Taxonomy ==
Euphorbia rubrostriata was first described by Emmanuel Drake del Castillo in 1903. As of February 2023, there is some confusion over the synonymy of this species. Plants of the World Online (PoWO) accepted only one synonym, Euphorbia mainiana. The African Plant Database also accepted this synonym, but in addition treated Euphorbia isaloensis as a synonym, which PoWO regarded as a separate species. Other sources, based on the now discontinued World Checklist of Selected Plant Families, regarded Euphorbia rubrostriata as a synonym of Euphorbia milii var. milii.
