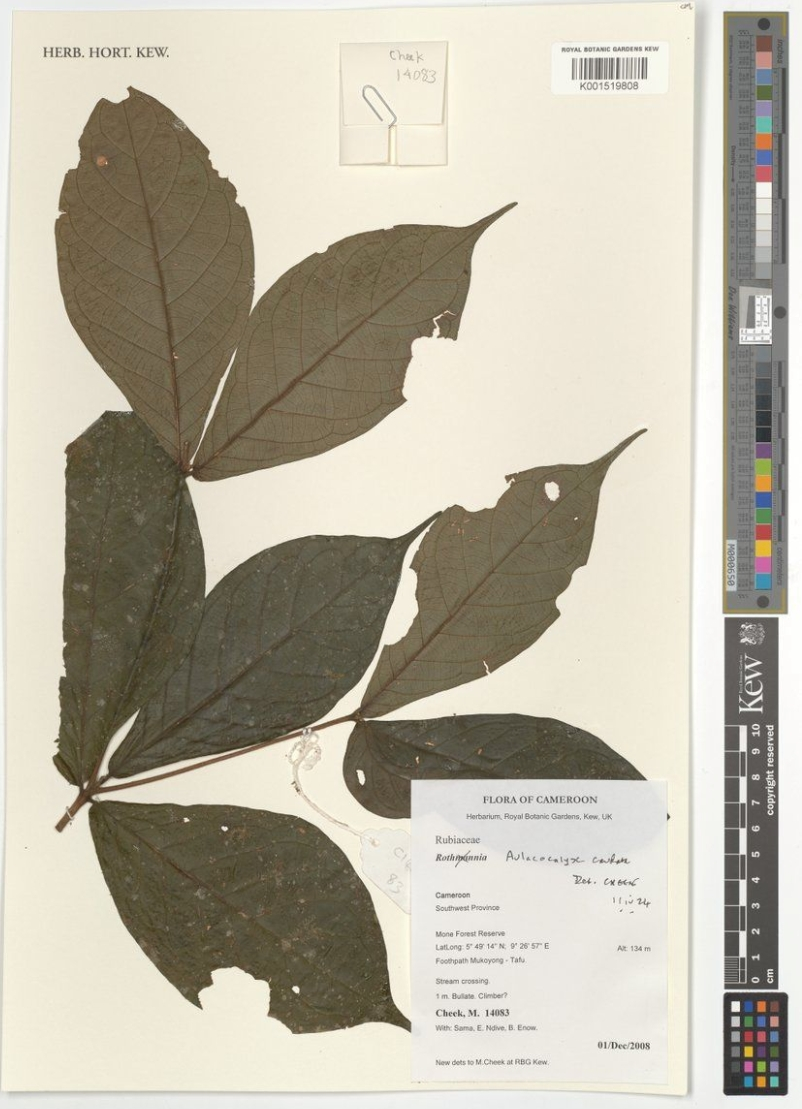

Conservation status
- Least Concern (IUCN 3.1)

Scientific classification
- Kingdom: Plantae
- Clade: Embryophytes
- Clade: Tracheophytes
- Clade: Angiosperms
- Clade: Eudicots
- Clade: Asterids
- Order: Gentianales
- Family: Rubiaceae
- Genus: Aulacocalyx
- Species: A. caudata

Binomial name
- Aulacocalyx caudata (Hiern) Keay

Synonyms
- Randia caudata Hiern; Aulacocalyx leptactinoides K.Schum.; Randia leptactinioides (K.Schum.) K.Schum. ex Hutch. & Dalziel; Rothmannia leptactinioides (K.Schum.) Fagerl.

= Aulacocalyx caudata =

Species of flowering plant

Aulacocalyx caudata is a species of flowering plant in the family Rubiaceae. It is a shrub or tree with white flowers and green fruits. The species is native to west Africa.

Aulacocalyx caudata was first described in 1877, and moved to its current genus in 1958. It is listed as of Least Concern by the IUCN.

== Taxonomy ==
The species was first described by William Philip Hiern in 1877, and placed in the genus Randia. In 1958, Ronald William John Keay moved the species to the genus Aulacocalyx.

The holotype was collected in Spanish Guinea (now Equatorial Guinea).

== Distribution ==
The species is native to the wet tropical biomes of Cameroon, Equatorial Guinea, Gabon, and Nigeria. It grows in primary, secondary, and riverine forests, and on mountain slopes at elevations of up to 800 metres (2,600 ft). Its area of occurrence is estimated to be 432,353.27 square kilometres (166,932.53 sq mi).

== Description ==
Aulacocalyx caudata is a shrub or tree that grows 2–4 metres (6.6–13.1 ft) high.

The leaves are 8.5–13 centimetres (3.3–5.1 in) long, 3.2–6.5 centimetres (1.3–2.6 in) wide, elliptical to ovate, and light green to brown when dry. The leaves grow on 2–3 millimetres (0.079–0.118 in) stems.

The inflorescences grow on 1–5 millimetres (0.039–0.197 in) stems, and usually have two to three flowers. The flowers are fragrant and white. The calyx tube is 2.5–4 millimetres (0.098–0.157 in) long, and green. The corolla is 4.5–8 centimetres (1.8–3.1 in) long, and white. The corolla has five elliptical lobes, which are 15–33 millimetres (0.59–1.30 in) long, and 5–10 millimetres (0.20–0.39 in) wide.

The fruits are round, 1.2–1.4 centimetres (0.47–0.55 in) long, green, and black when dry. The seeds are around 6 millimetres (0.24 in) long, around 4 millimetres (0.16 in) wide, and black when dry.

== Conservation ==
In 2018, the IUCN assessed Aulacocalyx caudata as of Least Concern. The species faces no significant threats. The population is large and stable.
