= Dalbergia emirnensis =

Conservation status
- Vulnerable (IUCN 3.1)
- CITES Appendix II

Scientific classification
- Kingdom: Plantae
- Clade: Tracheophytes
- Clade: Angiosperms
- Clade: Eudicots
- Clade: Rosids
- Order: Fabales
- Family: Fabaceae
- Subfamily: Faboideae
- Genus: Dalbergia
- Species: D. emirnensis

Binomial name
- Dalbergia emirnensis Benth.

Synonyms
- Amerimnon emirnense (Benth.) Kuntze; Dalbergia campenonii Drake

Species of legume

Dalbergia emirnensis is a species of legume in the family Fabaceae. It is found only in Madagascar. It is threatened by habitat loss.

== Taxonomy and history ==
Dalbergia emirnensis was first formally described by English botanist George Bentham in 1860. The specific epithet "emirnensis" is derived from the word "Emirna" or "Emyrna", an archaic spelling of the name of the Imerina people, within whose territory the type specimen was collected. Two varieties, D. emirnensis var. emirnensis and D. emirnensis var. decaryi, were described in 1996 by Jean Marie Bosser and Raymond Rabevohitra, however, a 2023 paper instead treats D. emirnensis var. decaryi as a subspecies of Dalbergia nemoralis, D. nemoralis subsp. decaryi, on the basis of its morphological and genetic differences from D. emirnensis. The same 2023 paper restricted D. emirnensis to populations labelled as D. emirnensis var. emirnensis and placed Dalbergia campenonii, a species described by Emmanuel Drake del Castillo in 1903, into synonymy with D. emirnensis.

== Distribution and habitat ==
Dalbergia emirnensis is known only from the Central Highlands of Madagascar at altitudes of 800–1,500 m (2,600–4,900 ft) above sea level. It is most widespread in the Analamanga region, but can also be found in the northern Alaotra-Mangoro region, the north-eastern corner of the Vakinankaratra region, and in the area where the borders of the Bongolava, Melaky, and Menabe regions meet. It inhabits humid and subhumid remnant forests, wooded grasslands, and secondary thickets in recently burned areas. It is often found along streams and rivers or near forest edges and primarily grows on sandy or rocky ferrallitic soils.

== Description ==
Dalbergia emirnensis is a shrub or tree growing to 42 m (138 ft) tall with a trunk diameter of up to 72 cm (28 in). The branches are largely hairless, with dark grey-brown bark and raised white lenticels. The leaves are arranged alternate to one another, each typically bearing 7 to 11 leaflets, though sometimes as few as 5 or as many as 12. The petiole, rachis, and petiolules are yellow-green in colour and covered in fine hairs. Individual leaflets are bright green, ovate to elliptic with a pointed tip, and measure 27–51 mm (1.1–2.0 in) by 12–22 mm (0.47–0.87 in). The upper surface of the leaflets is slightly glossy and mostly hairless, while the underside is matte. The inflorescence is a hairy, dense, and multibranched panicle measuring 5.9–10 cm (2.3–3.9 in) long.

== Ecology ==
Dalbergia emirnensis is known to flower from November to February, during the beginning and middle of the rainy season, and to fruit from January to May.

== Conservation status ==
Dalbergia emirnensis is listed as vulnerable on the International Union for the Conservation of Nature Red List under criteria A4acd and B2ab(i,ii,iii,iv,v), based on the decline of its habitat and projected population decline. It is threatened by habitat degradation, logging, and the harvesting of wood for firewood and charcoal production.

The international trade of D. emirnensis is regulated under Appendix II of the CITES treaty, and it is known to be conserved ex situ.
