= Nematostylis =

Scientific classification
- Kingdom: Plantae
- Clade: Tracheophytes
- Clade: Angiosperms
- Clade: Eudicots
- Clade: Asterids
- Order: Gentianales
- Family: Rubiaceae
- Subfamily: Ixoroideae
- Tribe: Alberteae
- Genus: Nematostylis; Hook.f.
- Species: N. anthophylla

Binomial name
- Nematostylis anthophylla (A.Rich. ex DC.) Baill.

Synonyms
- Alberta loranthoides (Hook.f.) Cavaco; Nematostylis loranthoides Hook.f.; Pavetta anthophylla A.Rich. ex DC.

Genus of plants

Nematostylis is a monotypic genus of flowering plants in the family Rubiaceae. The genus contains only one species, i.e. Nematostylis anthophylla, which is endemic to Madagascar.

== Taxonomy ==
The genus was described by Joseph Dalton Hooker in 1873 and only held the species Nematostylis loranthoides. This species was made synonym with Nematostylis anthophylla, which then became the type species.
