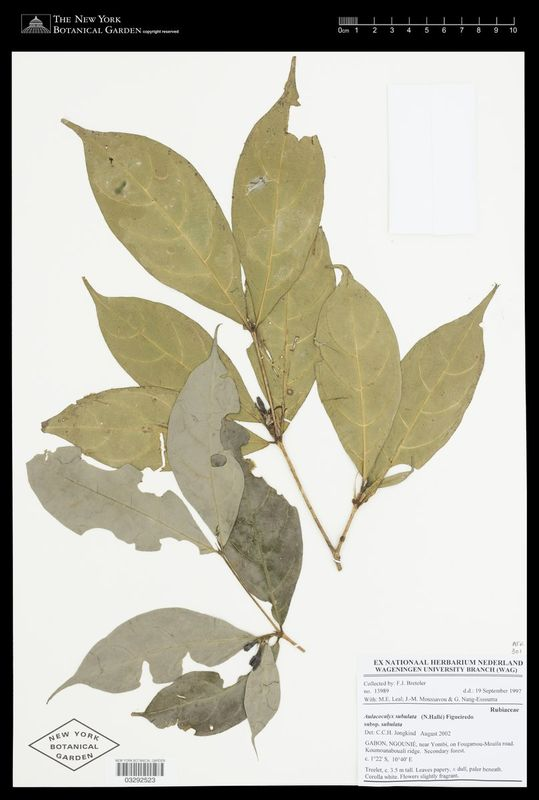
- Aulacocalyx subulata subsp. subulata

Scientific classification
- Kingdom: Plantae
- Clade: Embryophytes
- Clade: Tracheophytes
- Clade: Angiosperms
- Clade: Eudicots
- Clade: Asterids
- Order: Gentianales
- Family: Rubiaceae
- Genus: Aulacocalyx
- Species: A. subulata

Binomial name
- Aulacocalyx subulata (N.Hallé) Figueiredo

Subspecies
- Aulacocalyx subulata subsp. glabra Figueiredo; Aulacocalyx subulata subsp. subulata

Synonyms
- Aulacocalyx lujae var. subulata N.Hallé

= Aulacocalyx subulata =

Species of flowering plant

Aulacocalyx subulata is a species of flowering plant in the family Rubiaceae. It is a shrub or tree with white flowers and green fruits. The species is native to Gabon, and was described in 1970.

== Taxonomy ==
Aulacocalyx subulata was first described in 1970, by Nicolas Hallé, as a variety of Aulacocalyx lujae. In 1997, Estrela Figueiredo placed it as a distinct species.

Two subspecies are recognised:

- Aulacocalyx subulata subsp. glabra Figueiredo
- Aulacocalyx subulata subsp. subulata

== Distribution ==
Aulacocalyx subulata is native to the wet tropical biome of Gabon. It grows in forests.

== Description ==
Aulacocalyx subulata is a shrub or tree that grows up to 3 metres (9.8 ft) high. The branchlets are striped.

The leaves are elliptical to lanceolate or oblanceolate, 8–14 centimetres (3.1–5.5 in) long, 3–5.5 centimetres (1.2–2.2 in) wide, and may be slightly asymmetrical. The upperside is dark green, and the underside is paler. The leaf stems are 3–5 millimetres (0.12–0.20 in) long.

The inflorescences grow on 1–9 millimetres (0.039–0.354 in) stems, and have two to eleven flowers. The calyx tube is 1.5–3 millimetres (0.059–0.118 in) long. The hypanthium is shorter than the calyx tube. The corolla tube is wider at the top, creamy to white in colour, and 1.6–2 centimetres (0.63–0.79 in) long. The corolla has five lobes, which are 7–9 millimetres (0.28–0.35 in) long, and 2.5–3.5 millimetres (0.098–0.138 in) wide.

The fruits are round, green, and 1–1.4 centimetres (0.39–0.55 in) wide. The fruits turn black when dry. The seeds are around 7 millimetres (0.28 in) long, around 5 millimetres (0.20 in) wide, and black when dry.
