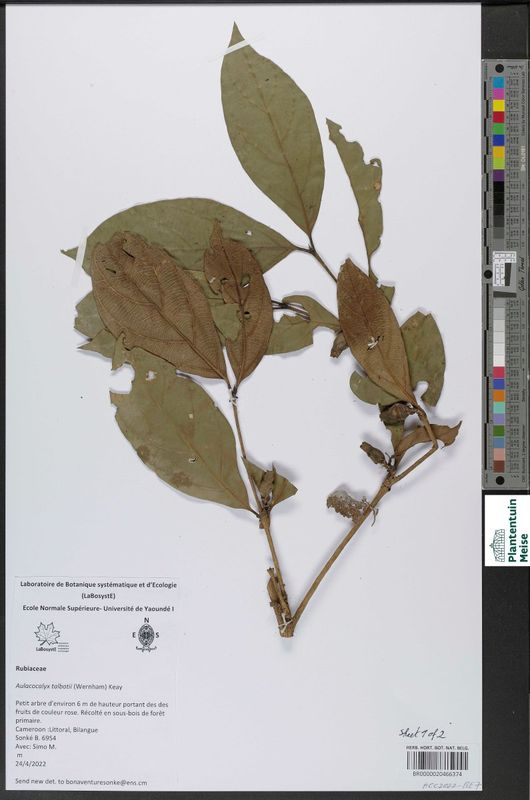

Conservation status
- Least Concern (IUCN 3.1)

Scientific classification
- Kingdom: Plantae
- Clade: Tracheophytes
- Clade: Angiosperms
- Clade: Eudicots
- Clade: Asterids
- Order: Gentianales
- Family: Rubiaceae
- Genus: Aulacocalyx
- Species: A. talbotii

Binomial name
- Aulacocalyx talbotii (Wernham) Keay

Synonyms
- Dorothea talbotii Wernham

= Aulacocalyx talbotii =

Species of flowering plant

Aulacocalyx talbotii is a species of flowering plant in the family Rubiaceae. It is a shrub or tree with cream-coloured flowers, and dark brown or purplish fruits. The species is native to west-central Africa.

Aulacocalyx talbotii was described in 1913, and is listed as of Least Concern by the IUCN.

== Taxonomy ==
Aulacocalyx talbotii was described by Herbert Fuller Wernham in 1913, and initially placed in the genus Dorothea. It was the type species of Dorothea. In 1958, Ronald William John Keay synonymised Dorothea and Aulacocalyx.

== Distribution ==
Aulacocalyx talbotii is native to Nigeria, Cameroon, Gabon, and the Republic of the Congo. Its estimated extent of occurrence is 204,821 square kilometres (79,082 sq mi). The species grows in lowland rainforests.

== Description ==
Aulacocalyx talbotii is a shrub or tree that grows up to 15 metres (49 ft) high. The trunk is greyish-green or cream with brown fibres. The branches are striped.

The leaves are elliptical to oblanceolate, light green to brown when dry, 10–14 centimetres (3.9–5.5 in) long, and 3.5–5 centimetres (1.4–2.0 in) wide. The leaf stem is 3–8 millimetres (0.12–0.31 in) long.

The inflorescence grows on a 3–5 millimetres (0.12–0.20 in) stem, and has three to five cream coloured flowers. The flower stems are 2–6 millimetres (0.079–0.236 in) long. The young buds are rod-shaped. The calyx tube is greenish-brown, 4–7 millimetres (0.16–0.28 in) long, and 5–7 millimetres (0.20–0.28 in) wide at the top. The hypanthium is slightly shorter than the calyx tube. The corolla is 4.5–5.5 centimetres (1.8–2.2 in) long, and yellowish, greyish, or green. The corolla has six to eight lobes, which are 8–12 millimetres (0.31–0.47 in) long, 3–5 millimetres (0.12–0.20 in) wide.

The fruits are around 4 centimetres (1.6 in) long, 3 centimetres (1.2 in) wide, round, and dark brown or purplish. The seeds are around 8 millimetres (0.31 in) long, 7 millimetres (0.28 in) wide, and black when dry.

== Conservation ==
In 2018, the IUCN assessed Aulacocalyx talbotii as of Least Concern. Its habitat may be threatened by urbanisation and logging.
