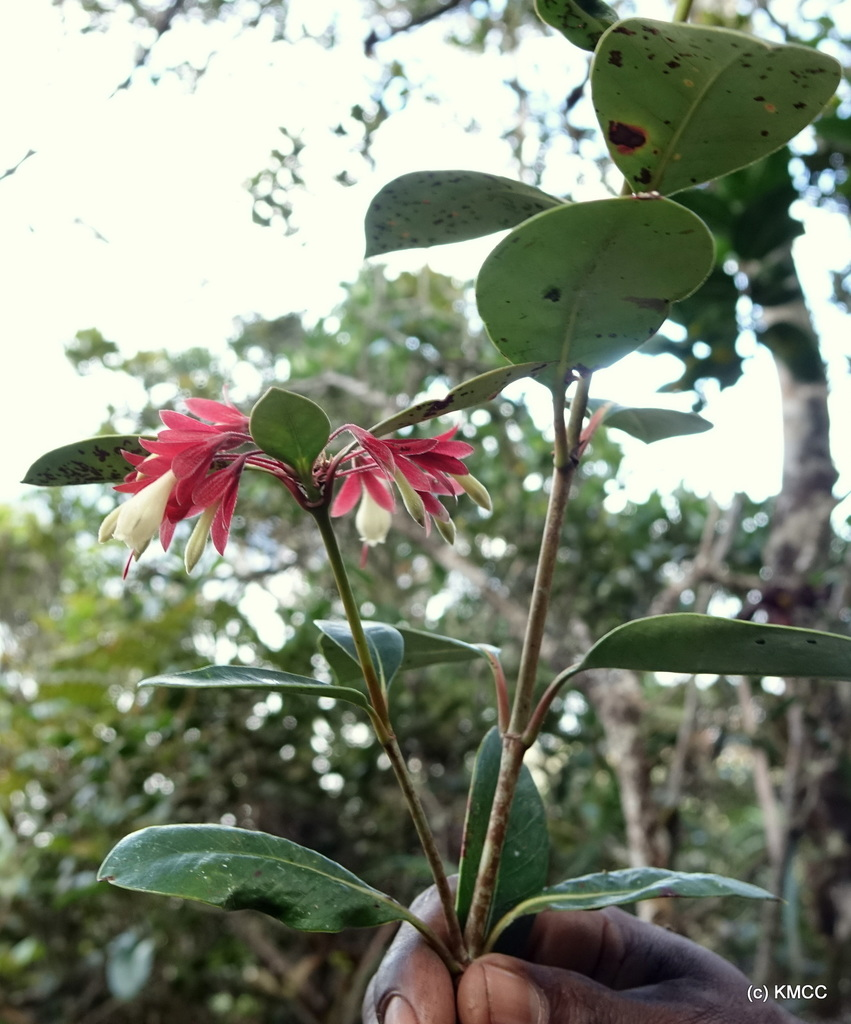
- Razafimandimbisonia minor

Scientific classification
- Kingdom: Plantae
- Clade: Embryophytes
- Clade: Tracheophytes
- Clade: Spermatophytes
- Clade: Angiosperms
- Clade: Eudicots
- Clade: Asterids
- Order: Gentianales
- Family: Rubiaceae
- Subfamily: Ixoroideae
- Tribe: Alberteae
- Genus: Razafimandimbisonia; Kainul. & B.Bremer

Type species
- Razafimandimbisonia minor Kainul. & B.Bremer

= Razafimandimbisonia =

Genus of plants

Razafimandimbisonia is a genus of flowering plants in the family Rubiaceae.

The genus was created in 2009, after Alberta was shown to be paraphyletic. It contains five species, all of which are endemic to Madagascar.

Razafimandimbisonia are shrubs or trees, with leathery leaves, and funnel-shaped corollas.

== Taxonomy ==
The genus Alberta was shown to be paraphyletic in a phylogenetic analysis of the tribe Alberteae. The type species Alberta magna is set apart from the Malagasy Alberta species. A new genus, Razafimandimbisonia, was proposed to accommodate these Malagasy species. It is named in honour of the botanist Sylvain G. Razafimandimbison.

== Species ==
- Razafimandimbisonia humblotii (Drake) Kainul. & B.Bremer
- Razafimandimbisonia minor (Baill.) Kainul. & B.Bremer
- Razafimandimbisonia orientalis (Homolle ex Cavaco) Kainul. & B.Bremer
- Razafimandimbisonia regalis (Puff & Robbr.) Kainul. & B.Bremer
- Razafimandimbisonia sambiranensis (Homolle ex Cavaco) Kainul. & B.Bremer

== Description ==
Razafimandimbisonia are shrubs or trees. The leaves are leathery, persistent, and have strong venation.

The corolla is funnel-shaped and more or less curved. It is uniform in colour, and has short hairs on the outside. The flowers are bilaterally symmetrical.

The fruits split into two when mature. Most species have five calycophylls, although R. sambiranensis has only one.
