= Gigasiphon humblotianum =

Scientific classification
- Kingdom: Plantae
- Clade: Tracheophytes
- Clade: Angiosperms
- Clade: Eudicots
- Clade: Rosids
- Order: Fabales
- Family: Fabaceae
- Genus: Gigasiphon
- Species: G. humblotianum

Binomial name
- Gigasiphon humblotianum (Baill.) Drake

Species of plant

Gigasiphon humblotianum is a legume in the subfamily Cercidoideae, endemic to Madagascar. Its most interesting feature is that the ovary is at the end of a gynophore up to 25 cm long, which in turn is surrounded by a floral tube of equal length. The overall appearance of the flower is similar to Bauhinia.
