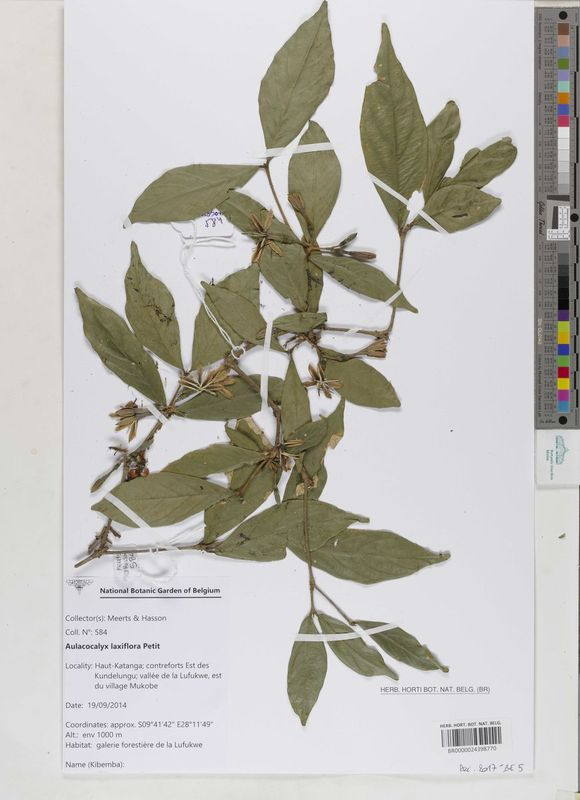

Conservation status
- Least Concern (IUCN 3.1)

Scientific classification
- Kingdom: Plantae
- Clade: Embryophytes
- Clade: Tracheophytes
- Clade: Spermatophytes
- Clade: Angiosperms
- Clade: Eudicots
- Clade: Asterids
- Order: Gentianales
- Family: Rubiaceae
- Genus: Aulacocalyx
- Species: A. laxiflora

Binomial name
- Aulacocalyx laxiflora E.M.A.Petit

= Aulacocalyx laxiflora =

Species of flowering plant

Aulacocalyx laxiflora is a species of flowering plant in the family Rubiaceae. It is a shrub or tree with elliptical leaves and white flowers. The species is native to The Democratic Republic of the Congo, Tanzania, and Zambia.

Aulacocalyx laxiflora was described in 1961, and is listed as of Least Concern by the IUCN.

== Taxonomy ==
The species was described by Ernest Marie Antoine Petit in 1961.

== Distribution ==
Aulacocalyx laxiflora is native to the seasonally dry tropical biome of the Democratic Republic of the Congo, Tanzania, and Zambia. Within Zambia, it is present in the Copperbelt, Northern, and Western regions. The species has an extent of occurrence of around 392,625 square kilometres (151,593 sq mi).

The species grows around Kalambo Falls, in miombo woodlands, gallery forests, and disturbed areas. It grows at elevations of 1,000–1,215 metres (3,281–3,986 ft).

== Description ==
Aulacocalyx laxiflora is a shrub or small tree that grows 2–8 metres (6.6–26.2 ft) high. The bark is more or less flaky.

The leaves are elliptical to elliptical-oblanceolate, 1.5–15 centimetres (0.59–5.91 in) long, and 0.4–6 centimetres (0.16–2.36 in) wide. The leaves may have domatia. The leaf stem is 2–5 millimetres (0.079–0.197 in) long.

The inflorescences grow on a 2–7 millimetres (0.079–0.276 in) stem, and have three to ten flowers. The calyx tube is 1.5–2.5 millimetres (0.059–0.098 in) long. The calyx lobes are linear, and 2–5 millimetres (0.079–0.197 in) long. The corolla is white, and forms a cylindrical, 0.5–2 centimetres (0.20–0.79 in) long tube. The corolla lobes are linear-oblong, 1.2–2 centimetres (0.47–0.79 in) long, and 3–6 millimetres (0.12–0.24 in) wide. The flowers are scented.

The fruit is round, and 1.2–1.3 centimetres (0.47–0.51 in) wide.

The species is similar to Heinsenia diervilleoides.

== Conservation ==
In 2022, the IUCN assessed Aulacocalyx laxiflora as of Least Concern. Agriculture and development may lead to habitat loss. The species is present in Kundelungu National Park.
