= Quercus xanthoclada =

Conservation status
- Data Deficient (IUCN 3.1)

Scientific classification
- Kingdom: Plantae
- Clade: Embryophytes
- Clade: Tracheophytes
- Clade: Spermatophytes
- Clade: Angiosperms
- Clade: Eudicots
- Clade: Rosids
- Order: Fagales
- Family: Fagaceae
- Genus: Quercus
- Subgenus: Quercus subg. Cerris
- Section: Quercus sect. Cyclobalanopsis
- Species: Q. xanthoclada

Binomial name
- Quercus xanthoclada Drake

Synonyms
- Cyclobalanopsis xanthoclada (Drake) Schottky

Species of flowering plant

Quercus xanthoclada is a species of oak. It is a tree native to Laos, Myanmar, and Vietnam in northern Indochina. It grows in moist montane oak–laurel forests from 800 to 1,200 metres elevation.

The species was described by Emmanuel Drake del Castillo in 1890.
