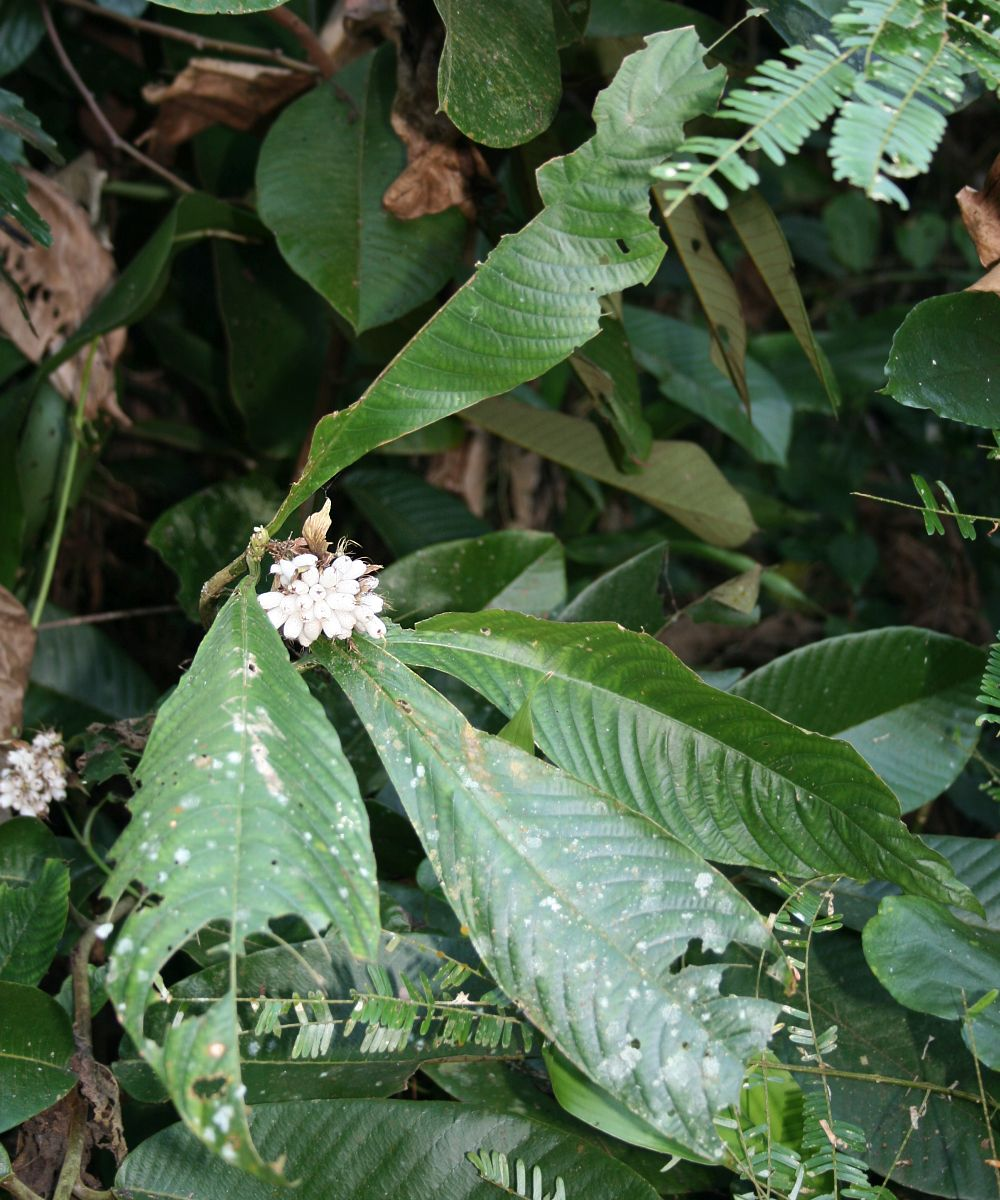
- Mycetia tonkinensis

Scientific classification
- Kingdom: Plantae
- Clade: Tracheophytes
- Clade: Angiosperms
- Clade: Eudicots
- Clade: Asterids
- Order: Gentianales
- Family: Rubiaceae
- Subfamily: Rubioideae
- Tribe: Argostemmateae
- Genus: Mycetia; Reinw.

Type species
- Mycetia cauliflora Reinw. (1825)

Synonyms
- Adenosacme Wall. ex Miq. (1857), nom. superfl.; Berliera Buch.-Ham. ex Wall. (1832), nom. nud.; Lawia Wight (1847); Lemairea de Vriese (1854); Myrioneuron R.Br. ex Benth. & Hook.f. (1873)

= Mycetia =

Genus of flowering plants

Mycetia is a genus of flowering plants in the family Rubiaceae. It includes 54 species, ranging from the Indian subcontinent through Indochina, southern China, and Malesia to New Guinea.

== Species ==
54 species are accepted:

- Mycetia acuminata (Wight) Kuntze
- Mycetia angustifolia Ridl.
- Mycetia anlongensis H.S.Lo
- Mycetia balansae Drake
- Mycetia basiflora Puff
- Mycetia brachybotrys Merr.
- Mycetia bracteata Hutch.
- Mycetia brevipes F.C.How
- Mycetia brevisepala H.S.Lo
- Mycetia cauliflora Reinw.
- Mycetia chasalioides (Craib) Craib
- Mycetia clarkei (Hook.f.) Razafim. & B.Bremer
- Mycetia dagohoyana Dela Bajan, Tandang & Alejandro
- Mycetia effusa (Pit.) Razafim. & B.Bremer
- Mycetia faberi (Hemsl.) Razafim. & B.Bremer
- Mycetia fangii K.J.Yan & Z.Q.Song
- Mycetia fasciculata (Blume) Blume ex Korth.
- Mycetia flava (Ridl.) Ridl.
- Mycetia glandulosa Craib
- Mycetia gracilis Craib
- Mycetia griffithii Z.Q.Song & Razafim.
- Mycetia hainanensis H.S.Lo
- Mycetia hirsuta (Kurz) Razafim. & B.Bremer
- Mycetia hirta Hutch.
- Mycetia holotricha (Miq.) Kuntze
- Mycetia javanica (Blume) Reinw. ex Korth.
- Mycetia listeri Deb
- Mycetia longiflora F.C.How ex H.S.Lo
- Mycetia longifolia (Wall.) Kuntze
- Mycetia macrocarpa F.C.How ex ined.
- Mycetia malayana (G.Don) Craib
- Mycetia mindanaensis (Elmer) Govaerts
- Mycetia minor Ridl.
- Mycetia mukerjiana Deb & Ratna Dutta
- Mycetia myrioneura Merr.
- Mycetia nepalensis H.Hara
- Mycetia nutans (R.Br. ex Kurz) Razafim. & B.Bremer
- Mycetia obovata (Miq.) Kuntze
- Mycetia ovatistipulata Fukuoka
- Mycetia paniculiformis Fukuoka
- Mycetia parishii Craib
- Mycetia parviflora (Hook.f.) Razafim. & B.Bremer
- Mycetia pubifolia (Pit.) Razafim. & B.Bremer
- Mycetia radiciflora (C.B.Clarke) Airy Shaw
- Mycetia rivicola Craib
- Mycetia rodgeri Deb & Mondal
- Mycetia siamensis Fukuoka
- Mycetia sinensis (Hemsl.) Craib
- Mycetia squamulosopilosa Pit.
- Mycetia stipulata (Hook.f.) Kuntze
- Mycetia suedixieana Tandang & Ordas
- Mycetia sumatrana Merr.
- Mycetia tonkinensis (Pit.) Razafim. & B.Bremer
- Mycetia yunnanica H.S.Lo
