= Tournaya =

Scientific classification
- Kingdom: Plantae
- Clade: Tracheophytes
- Clade: Angiosperms
- Clade: Eudicots
- Clade: Rosids
- Order: Fabales
- Family: Fabaceae
- Genus: Tournaya; A.Schmitz
- Species: T. gossweileri

Binomial name
- Tournaya gossweileri (Baker f.) A.Schmitz

Synonyms
- Bauhinia gossweileri Baker f.; Gigasiphon gossweileri (Baker f.) Torre & Hillc.

Species of flowering plant

Tournaya is a monotypic genus of flowering plants belonging to the family Fabaceae. It just contains one species, Tournaya gossweileri (Baker f.) A.Schmitz

Its native range is western central Tropical Africa and is found in the countries of Angola, Congo, Gabon and Zaïre.

The genus name of Tournaya is in honour of Roland Louis Jules Alfred Tournay (1925–1972), a Belgian botanist and publisher of the bulletin of the National Botanic Garden of Belgium (now the Meise Botanic Garden). The Latin specific epithet of gossweileri is due to the Swiss-born Angolan botanist, John Gossweiler (1873-1952), who collected the type specimen of G. lanceolata. Both the genus and the species were first described and published in Bull. Jard. Bot. Natl. Belg. Vol.43 on page 397-398 in 1973.

It was downgraded to a synonym of Gigasiphon in 2010, but then re-established as a separate genus in 2020.
