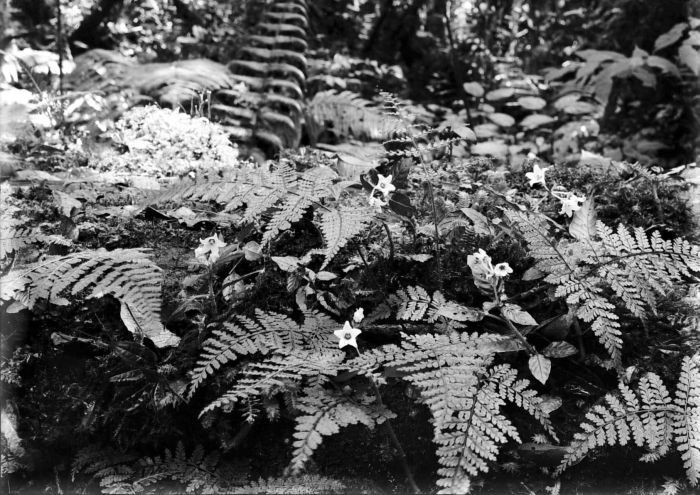
- COLLECTIE TROPENMUSEUM Argostemma montanum. Rubiceae tussen varens Tjibodas TMnr

Scientific classification
- Kingdom: Plantae
- Clade: Tracheophytes
- Clade: Angiosperms
- Clade: Eudicots
- Clade: Asterids
- Order: Gentianales
- Family: Rubiaceae
- Subfamily: Rubioideae
- Tribe: Argostemmateae

= Argostemmateae =

Tribe of plants

Argostemmateae is a tribe of flowering plants in the family Rubiaceae and contains about 215 species in 4 genera. Its representatives are found in tropical Africa, and tropical and subtropical Asia.

== Genera ==
Currently accepted names

- Argostemma Wall. (163 sp)
- Leptomischus Drake
- Mouretia Pit. (4 sp)
- Mycetia Reinw. (45 sp)
- Neohymenopogon Bennet (3 sp)

Synonyms

- Adenosacme Wall. ex G.Don = Mycetia
- Argostemmella Ridl. = Argostemma
- Lawia Wight = Mycetia
- Pomangium Reinw. = Argostemma
