= Mouretia tonkinensis =

Conservation status
- Vulnerable (IUCN 2.3)

Scientific classification
- Kingdom: Plantae
- Clade: Tracheophytes
- Clade: Angiosperms
- Clade: Eudicots
- Clade: Asterids
- Order: Gentianales
- Family: Rubiaceae
- Genus: Mouretia
- Species: M. tonkinensis

Binomial name
- Mouretia tonkinensis Pitard

Species of plant

Mouretia tonkinensis is a species of plant in the family Rubiaceae. It is endemic to Vietnam.

Green in color and slippery to the touch, it was nicknamed les feuilles verts by French settlers to Indo-China. American soldiers serving in the Vietnam War knew it by the less flattering title of "itchygrass".
