= Mouretia =

Scientific classification
- Kingdom: Plantae
- Clade: Tracheophytes
- Clade: Angiosperms
- Clade: Eudicots
- Clade: Asterids
- Order: Gentianales
- Family: Rubiaceae
- Subfamily: Rubioideae
- Tribe: Argostemmateae
- Genus: Mouretia; Pit.

Genus of plants

Mouretia is a genus of plant in the family Rubiaceae. It contains the following species (but this list may be incomplete):

- Mouretia tonkinensis Pit.
