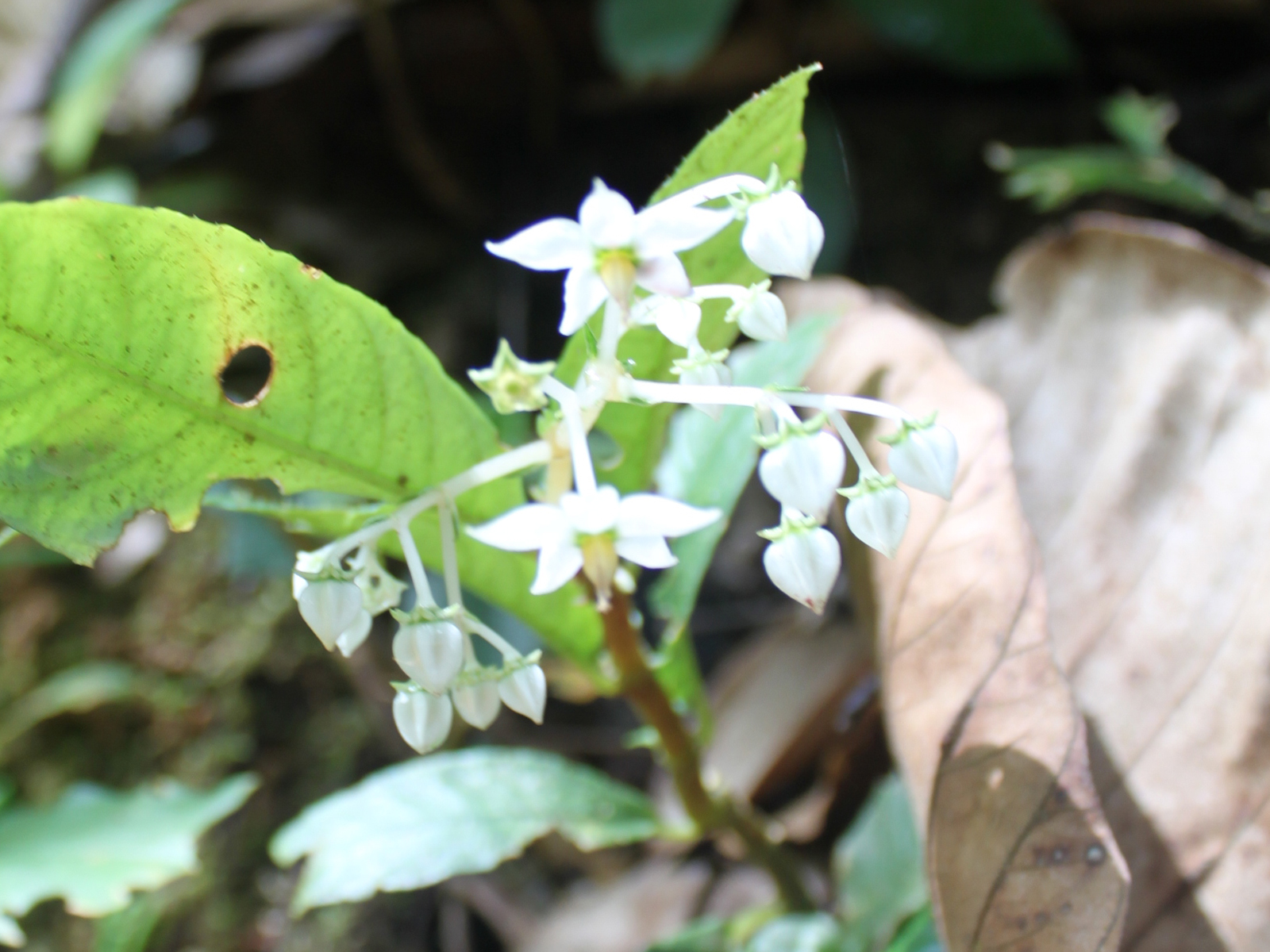

Scientific classification
- Kingdom: Plantae
- Clade: Tracheophytes
- Clade: Angiosperms
- Clade: Eudicots
- Clade: Asterids
- Order: Gentianales
- Family: Rubiaceae
- Genus: Argostemma
- Species: A. ophirense

Binomial name
- Argostemma ophirense Maingay ex Hook.f.

= Argostemma ophirense =

Species of plant

Argostemma ophirense is a species of herbaceous flowering plant in the family Rubiaceae. It can be found on ground or on rocks in the rainforests of Thailand, Malaysia, and Borneo.
