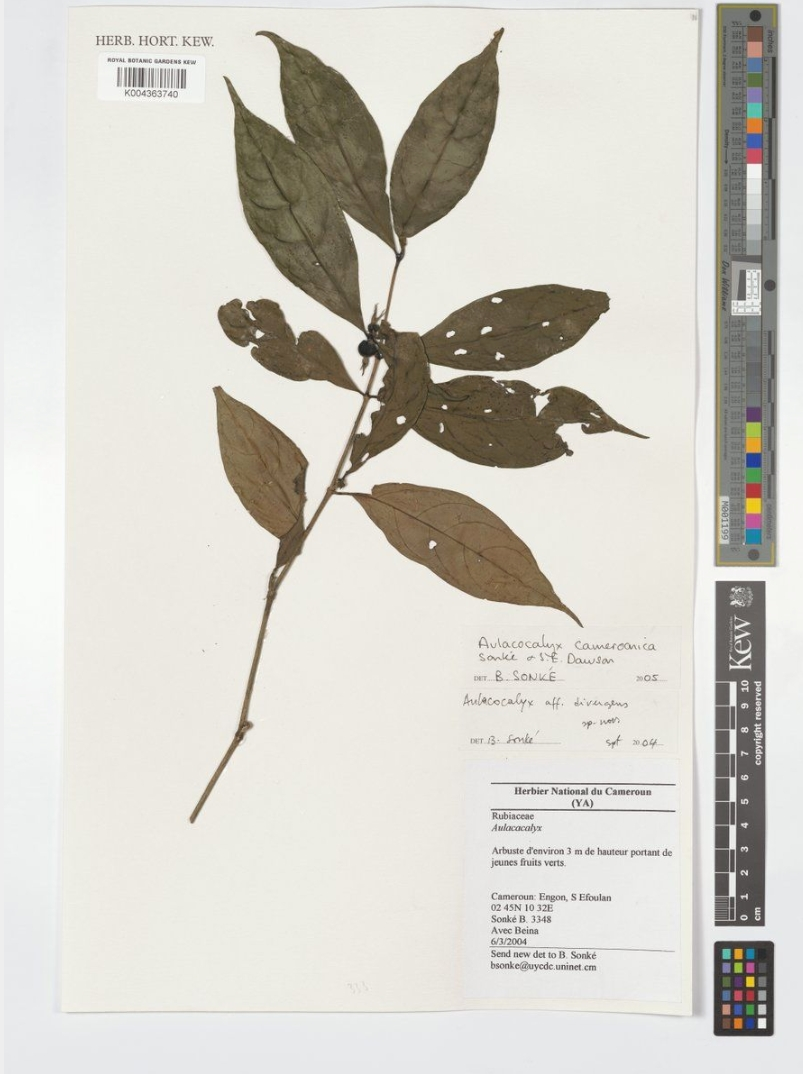

Conservation status
- Critically Endangered (IUCN 3.1)

Scientific classification
- Kingdom: Plantae
- Clade: Embryophytes
- Clade: Tracheophytes
- Clade: Spermatophytes
- Clade: Angiosperms
- Clade: Eudicots
- Clade: Asterids
- Order: Gentianales
- Family: Rubiaceae
- Genus: Aulacocalyx
- Species: A. camerooniana

Binomial name
- Aulacocalyx camerooniana Sonké & S.E.Dawson

= Aulacocalyx camerooniana =

Species of flowering plant

Aulacocalyx camerooniana is a species of flowering plant in the family Rubiaceae. It was first described in 2005.

Aulacocalyx camerooniana is a shrub with white flowers, and green fruits. Unusually for the genus Aulacocalyx, the leaves are unequally sized.

A. camerooniana is known only from a small area of southern Cameroon. The number of mature plants is likely to be fewer than two-hundred and fifty, and the species has been assesssed as Critically Endangered.

== Taxonomy ==
Bonaventure Sonké and Sally Emma Dawson described the species in 2005. The type specimens were collected from Cameroon in 2004.

== Distribution ==
Aulacocalyx camerooniana is native to the wet tropical biome of southern Cameroon. The species is only known from the west of Campo Ma'an National Park, and its estimated area of occupancy is 4 square kilometres (1.5 sq mi).

Aulacocalyx camerooniana grows in evergreen forests, at elevations of 620–800 metres (2,030–2,620 ft).

== Description ==
Aulacocalyx camerooniana is a shrub that grows 2–3 metres (6.6–9.8 ft) tall. The bark is pale brown.

Unlike other species of Aulacocalyx, A. camerooniana has leaves of unequal size. In each pair of leaves, one is twice the area of the other. The leaves are 10–12 centimetres (3.9–4.7 in) long, and 3.5–4.4 centimetres (1.4–1.7 in) wide. The leaf stems are 4–7 millimetres (0.16–0.28 in) long.

Aulacocalyx camerooniana has white flowers. The calyx is a 1.5–2 millimetres (0.059–0.079 in) long tube, with dense hairs on the outside, and 5–7 millimetres (0.20–0.28 in) long lobes. The corolla is an 8–10 millimetres (0.31–0.39 in) long tube, contorted to the left, and has 5.5–9.5 millimetres (0.22–0.37 in) lobes. The IUCN describes the species as "highly conspicuous in flower".

Each branch has only one inflorescence. The inflorescence has two to three flowers, and a 7–8 millimetres (0.28–0.31 in) long stem.

The fruits are green, and somewhat spherical. The seeds are pyramidal, and dark brown.

== Conservation ==
In 2017, the IUCN assessed Aulacocalyx camerooniana as Critically Endangered. The number of mature individuals is between three and two-hundred and fifty. Although it grows in a protected area, the species could be threatened by human activity, including agriculture and logging. Trends in the population size are unknown.
