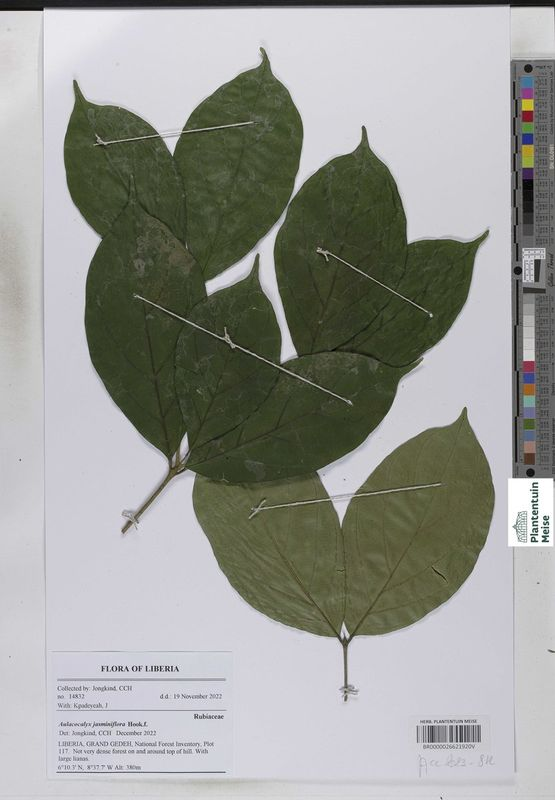

Conservation status
- Least Concern (IUCN 3.1)

Scientific classification
- Kingdom: Plantae
- Clade: Tracheophytes
- Clade: Angiosperms
- Clade: Eudicots
- Clade: Asterids
- Order: Gentianales
- Family: Rubiaceae
- Genus: Aulacocalyx
- Species: A. jasminiflora

Binomial name
- Aulacocalyx jasminiflora Hook.f.

Subspecies
- Aulacocalyx jasminiflora subsp. jasminiflora; Aulacocalyx jasminiflora subsp. kivuensis E.Figueiredo

= Aulacocalyx jasminiflora =

Species of flowering plant

Aulacocalyx jasminiflora is a species of flowering plant in the family Rubiaceae. It is a shrub or tree with white and green flowers. The species is native to west African forests.

Aulacocalyx jasminiflora was described in 1873, and is listed as of Least Concern by the IUCN.

== Taxonomy ==
Aulacocalyx jasminiflora was first described in 1873, by Joseph Dalton Hooker, in Icones Plantarum.

There are two recognised subspecies:

- Aulacocalyx jasminiflora subsp. jasminiflora
- Aulacocalyx jasminiflora subsp. kivuensis E.Figueiredo

== Distribution ==
Aulacocalyx jasminiflora is native to the wet tropical biome of west Africa. It is present in Angola, Cameroon, the Central African Republic, the Republic of the Congo, the Democratic Republic of the Congo, Equatorial Guinea, Gabon, Ghana, Guinea, Ivory Coast, Liberia, Nigeria, Sierra Leone, and Zambia. The species' extent of occurrence is around 4,283,854 square kilometres (1,654,005 sq mi).

The species grows in the understory of primary, secondary, and gallery forests, at elevations of up to 1,500 metres (4,900 ft).

== Description ==
Aulacocalyx jasminiflora is a shrub or tree that grows up to 1.5–6 metres (4.9–19.7 ft) high. The trunk is fluted.

The leaves are oblong-elliptical, 7–16 centimetres (2.8–6.3 in) long, and 1.8–6 centimetres (0.71–2.36 in) wide. The leaf stem is 2–4 millimetres (0.079–0.157 in) long.

The inflorescence lacks a stalk, and normally has two or three flowers. The corolla is white on top, green on the bottom, and narrowly funnel shaped or cylindrical. The corolla forms a 1.5–3 centimetres (0.59–1.18 in) tube, and has lobes. The lobes are narrowly oblong, 0.7–2 centimetres (0.28–0.79 in) long, and 0.2–0.6 centimetres (0.079–0.236 in) wide. The calyx is pale green, and forms a tube around 1.5 millimetres (0.059 in) long. The calyx has lobes, which are triangular or narrow and tapering, and 1–5 millimetres (0.039–0.197 in) long.

The fruit is 1–1.2 centimetres (0.39–0.47 in) wide, and covered in short soft hairs. The seeds are likely dispersed by birds.

== Conservation ==
In 2019, the IUCN assessed Aulacocalyx jasminiflora as of Least Concern, although the population is thought to be declining. The species' habitat is threatened by agriculture, logging, mining, and urbanisation.

The species is present in protected areas, including the Mount Nimba Strict Nature Reserve, the Atewa Range Forest Reserve, the Omo Forest Reserve, Korup National Park, the Dja Faunal Reserve, Lobéké National Park, the Monte Alén National Park, Waka National Park, Moukalaba-Doudou National Park, Odzala-Kokoua National Park, the Dzanga-Sangha Special Reserve, Okapi Wildlife Reserve, the Yangambi Biosphere Reserve, the Dimonika Biosphere Reserve, and Kahuzi-Biéga National Park.
