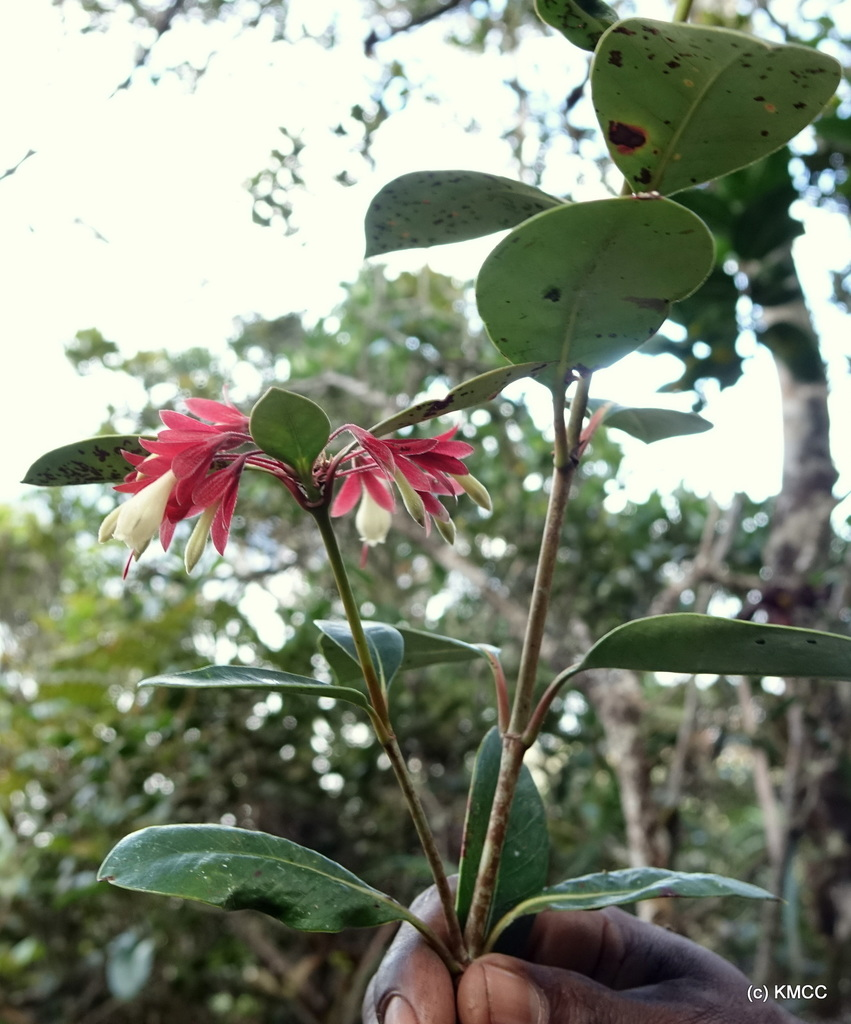

Conservation status
- Least Concern (IUCN 3.1)

Scientific classification
- Kingdom: Plantae
- Clade: Embryophytes
- Clade: Tracheophytes
- Clade: Spermatophytes
- Clade: Angiosperms
- Clade: Eudicots
- Clade: Asterids
- Order: Gentianales
- Family: Rubiaceae
- Genus: Razafimandimbisonia
- Species: R. minor

Binomial name
- Razafimandimbisonia minor (Baill.) Kainul. & B.Bremer

Synonyms
- Alberta minor Baill.; Alberta humblotii var. acuminata Cavaco; Alberta laurifolia Baker; Alberta minor var. isaloensis Cavaco

= Razafimandimbisonia minor =

Species of flowering plant

Razafimandimbisonia minor is a species of flowering plant in the family Rubiaceae. It is a shrub or tree with leathery leaves. It is endemic to Madagascar, and grows in shrublands and forests.

R. minor was described in 1879, and moved to its current genus in 2009. It is the type species of Razafimandimbisonia. The IUCN lists the species as of Least Concern.

== Taxonomy ==
In 1879, Henri Ernest Baillon described Alberta minor, a synonym of Razafimandimbisonia minor. In 2009, Kent Kainulainen and Birgitta Bremer moved the species to the newly created genus Razafimandimbisonia.

Razafimandimbisonia minor is the type species of the genus Razafimandimbisonia.

== Distribution ==
Razafimandimbisonia minor is native to the seasonally dry tropical biome of central Madagascar. It is endemic to the country. Within Madagascar, it is present in the provinces of Antsiranana, Antananarivo, Fianarantsoa, Toamasina, and Toliara. Its estimated extent of occurrence is 366,116 square kilometres (141,358 sq mi).

The species occurs in shrublands, forests of Uapaca bojeri trees, and rocky areas. The species grows on laterite, weathered granite, and quartzitic substrates, and is found at elevations of 10–2,100 metres (33–6,890 ft).

== Description ==
Razafimandimbisonia minor is a shrub or tree up to 15 metres (49 ft) high.

It has leathery, persistent leaves. The corolla is tube-shaped, and more or less curved. The fruits are dehiscent.

== Conservation ==
In 2019, the IUCN assessed Razafimandimbisonia minor as of Least Concern. It is present in twelve protected areas, including Andringitra National Park, Marolambo National Park, and Isalo National Park. There are thirty-one known sub-populations.

The species is threatened by fire, deforestation, and mining.
