= Inversodicraea koukoutamba =

Conservation status
- Critically Endangered (IUCN 3.1)

Scientific classification
- Kingdom: Plantae
- Clade: Tracheophytes
- Clade: Angiosperms
- Clade: Eudicots
- Clade: Rosids
- Order: Malpighiales
- Family: Podostemaceae
- Genus: Inversodicraea
- Species: I. koukoutamba

Binomial name
- Inversodicraea koukoutamba Cheek

Species of flowering plant

Inversodicraea koukoutamba is a flowering plant in the family Podostemaceae discovered in Guinea, Africa in the Bafing River. The family is known as the 'orchids of the falls' (although not orchids). It is a rubbery aquatic plant which can grow up to 20 m (66 ft).
