= Leptomischus =

Scientific classification
- Kingdom: Plantae
- Clade: Tracheophytes
- Clade: Angiosperms
- Clade: Eudicots
- Clade: Asterids
- Order: Gentianales
- Family: Rubiaceae
- Subfamily: Rubioideae
- Tribe: Argostemmateae
- Genus: Leptomischus; Drake

Type species
- Leptomischus primuloides Drake

Synonyms
- Indopolysolenia Bennet; Polysolen Rauschert; Polysolenia Hook.f.

Genus of flowering plants

Leptomischus is a genus of plants in the family Rubiaceae, native to southern China and southeast Asia. A 2019 molecular phylogenetic study placed it in the tribe Argostemmateae.

== Species ==
As of September 2021, Plants of the World Online recognises the following species:

- Leptomischus erianthus H.S.Lo – Yunnan
- Leptomischus flaviflorus Hareesh, L.Wu & M.Sabu – Arunachal Pradesh
- Leptomischus funingensis H.S.Lo – Yunnan
- Leptomischus guangxiensis H.S.Lo – Guangxi
- Leptomischus hiepii L.Wu, K.S.Nguyen & Aver. – Vietnam
- Leptomischus parviflorus H.S.Lo – Yunnan, Vietnam, Hainan
- Leptomischus primuloides Drake – Yunnan, Vietnam, Myanmar
- Leptomischus wallichii (Hook.f.) H.S.Lo – Assam
