= Aulacocalyx lamprophylla =

Scientific classification
- Kingdom: Plantae
- Clade: Embryophytes
- Clade: Tracheophytes
- Clade: Spermatophytes
- Clade: Angiosperms
- Clade: Eudicots
- Clade: Asterids
- Order: Gentianales
- Family: Rubiaceae
- Genus: Aulacocalyx
- Species: A. lamprophylla

Binomial name
- Aulacocalyx lamprophylla K.Krause

Species of flowering plant

Aulacocalyx lamprophylla is a species of flowering plant in the family Rubiaceae. It is native to the wet tropical biome of Cameroon. The species was described by Kurt Krause in 1920.
