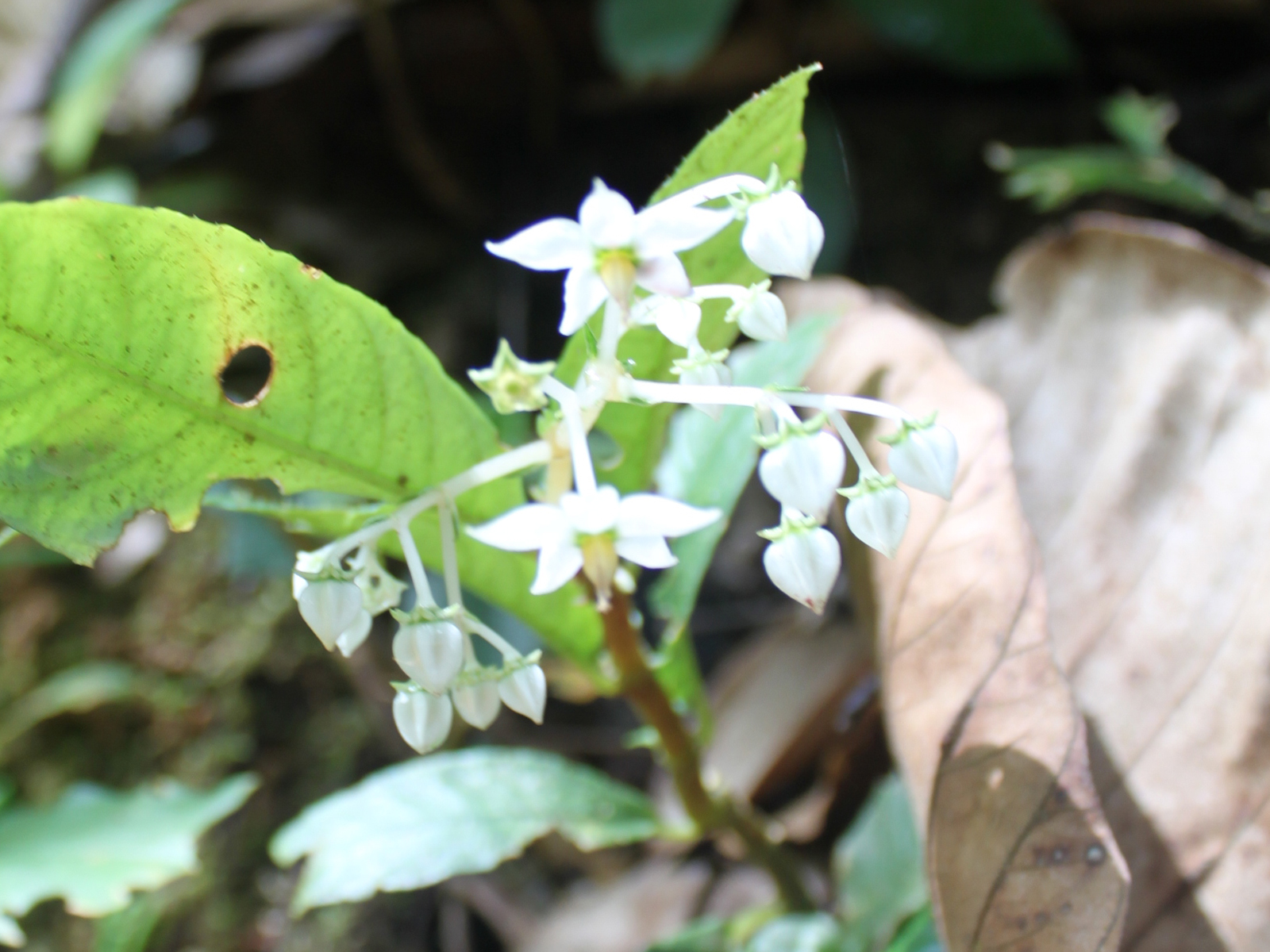
- Argostemma ophirense in Thailand

Scientific classification
- Kingdom: Plantae
- Clade: Embryophytes
- Clade: Tracheophytes
- Clade: Spermatophytes
- Clade: Angiosperms
- Clade: Eudicots
- Clade: Asterids
- Order: Gentianales
- Family: Rubiaceae
- Subfamily: Rubioideae
- Tribe: Argostemmateae
- Genus: Argostemma; Wall.

Synonyms
- Argostemmella Ridl.; Pomangium Reinw.

= Argostemma =

Genus of flowering plants

Argostemma is a genus of flowering plants in the family Rubiaceae. It can be found in (sub)tropical Asia and western and west-central tropical Africa.

== Species ==
1. Argostemma acuminatissimum Ridl.
2. Argostemma aequifolium Ridl.
3. Argostemma africana K.Schum.
4. Argostemma angustifolium Miq.
5. Argostemma anisophyllum Merr.
6. Argostemma annamiticum Ridl.
7. Argostemma anupama Sivar.
8. Argostemma apiculatum B.Bremer
9. Argostemma arachnosum Merr.
10. Argostemma attenuatum Valeton
11. Argostemma bariense Pierre ex Pit.
12. Argostemma begoniaceum Miq.
13. Argostemma bicolor King
14. Argostemma bifolium Ridl.
15. Argostemma borragineum Blume ex DC.
16. Argostemma brachyantherum Stapf
17. Argostemma brevicaule Valeton
18. Argostemma brookei B.Bremer
19. Argostemma bryophilum K.Schum.
20. Argostemma burttii B.Bremer
21. Argostemma buwaldae Bakh.f.
22. Argostemma calcicola B.Bremer
23. Argostemma callitrichum Valeton
24. Argostemma carstensense Wernham
25. Argostemma chaii B.Bremer
26. Argostemma coenosciadicum Suringar
27. Argostemma concinnum Hemsl.
28. Argostemma condensum Craib
29. Argostemma courtallense Arn.
30. Argostemma cordatum Nuraliev
31. Argostemma crassinerve Valeton
32. Argostemma debile Ridl.
33. Argostemma densifolium Ridl.
34. Argostemma denticulatum Ridl.
35. Argostemma discolor Merr.
36. Argostemma dispar Craib
37. Argostemma distichum Valeton
38. Argostemma diversifolium Ridl.
39. Argostemma dulitense Merr.
40. Argostemma ebracteolatum Geddes
41. Argostemma elatostemma Hook.f.
42. Argostemma elongatum Ridl.
43. Argostemma enerve Ridl.
44. Argostemma epitrichum Valeton
45. Argostemma fallax Bakh.f.
46. Argostemma fasciculata Sridith & K.Larsen
47. Argostemma flavescens Bakh.f.
48. Argostemma fragile Geddes
49. Argostemma gaharuense B.Bremer
50. Argostemma geesinkii B.Bremer
51. Argostemma gracile Stapf
52. Argostemma grandiflorum Ridl.
53. Argostemma griseum Valeton
54. Argostemma hainanicum H.S.Lo
55. Argostemma hameliifolium Wernham
56. Argostemma havilandii Ridl.
57. Argostemma hirsutum Ridl.
58. Argostemma hirtellum Ridl.
59. Argostemma hirtum Ridl.
60. Argostemma hookeri King
61. Argostemma humifusum W.W.Sm.
62. Argostemma humile Benn.
63. Argostemma inaequale Benn.
64. Argostemma inaequilaterum Benn.
65. Argostemma invalidum Ridl.
66. Argostemma jabiense Valeton
67. Argostemma johorense Ridl.
68. Argostemma junghuhnii Miq.
69. Argostemma khasianum C.B.Clarke
70. Argostemma klossii Ridl.
71. Argostemma korthalsii Miq.
72. Argostemma kurzii C.B.Clarke
73. Argostemma laeve Benn.
74. Argostemma laevigatum Benn.
75. Argostemma lanceolarium Ridl.
76. Argostemma lanceolatum Ridl.
77. Argostemma laxum Geddes
78. Argostemma linearifolium Valeton
79. Argostemma linguafelis Wernham
80. Argostemma lobbii Hook.f.
81. Argostemma lobulatum Craib
82. Argostemma longifolium Benn.
83. Argostemma longistimula Ridl.
84. Argostemma longistipula Ridl.
85. Argostemma macrosepalum Miq.
86. Argostemma maquilingense Elmer
87. Argostemma monophyllum Ridl.
88. Argostemma montanum Blume ex DC.
89. Argostemma montense Ridl.
90. Argostemma montisdoormannii Valeton
91. Argostemma moultonii Ridl.
92. Argostemma multinervium Ridl.
93. Argostemma muscicola Ridl.
94. Argostemma nanum Valeton
95. Argostemma neesianum Walp.
96. Argostemma nervosum Ridl.
97. Argostemma neurocalyx Miq.
98. Argostemma neurosepalum Bakh.f.
99. Argostemma nigrum M.R.Hend.
100. Argostemma nutans King
101. Argostemma oblongum King
102. Argostemma oliganthum Kurz
103. Argostemma ophirense Maingay ex Hook.f.
104. Argostemma parishii Hook.f.
105. Argostemma parvifolium Benn.
106. Argostemma parvum Geddes
107. Argostemma pauciflorum Blume ex DC.
108. Argostemma pedicellatum Elmer
109. Argostemma pedunculosum Miq.
110. Argostemma perakense King
111. Argostemma perplexum Merr. & L.M.Perry
112. Argostemma pictum Wall.
113. Argostemma phyllocharis Sridith
114. Argostemma plumbeum Craib
115. Argostemma propinquum Ridl.
116. Argostemma psychotrichoides Ridl.
117. Argostemma puffii Sridith
118. Argostemma pulchellum Geddes
119. Argostemma pumilum Benn.
120. Argostemma pusillum Valeton
121. Argostemma pygmaeum Valeton
122. Argostemma quarantena Balan
123. Argostemma reptans Ridl.
124. Argostemma ridleyi King
125. Argostemma riparium Ridl.
126. Argostemma roemeri Valeton
127. Argostemma rostratum Wall.
128. Argostemma rotundicalyx Sridith
129. Argostemma rugosum Ridl.
130. Argostemma rupestre Ridl.
131. Argostemma rupestrinum Elmer
132. Argostemma sarmentosum Wall.
133. Argostemma saxatile Chun & F.C.How ex W.C.Chen
134. Argostemma sessilifolium Ridl.
135. Argostemma siamense Puff
136. Argostemma solaniflorum Elmer
137. Argostemma squalens Ridl.
138. Argostemma stellare Ridl.
139. Argostemma stellatum Craib
140. Argostemma stenophyllum Merr.
141. Argostemma subcrassum King
142. Argostemma subfalcifolium Bakh.f.
143. Argostemma subinaequale Benn.
144. Argostemma succulentum Ridl.
145. Argostemma sumatranum Boerl. & Koord.
146. Argostemma tavoyanum Wall. ex Benn.
147. Argostemma tenue Ridl.
148. Argostemma teysmannianum Miq.
149. Argostemma thaithongae Sridith
150. Argostemma timorense Benn.
151. Argostemma trichanthum Ridl.
152. Argostemma trichosanthes Merr.
153. Argostemma triflorum Ridl.
154. Argostemma uniflorum Blume ex DC.
155. Argostemma unifolioloides King
156. Argostemma unifolium Benn.
157. Argostemma urticifolium King
158. Argostemma variegatum Merr.
159. Argostemma verticillatum Wall.
160. Argostemma victorianum Nob.Tanaka
161. Argostemma viscidum Ridl.
162. Argostemma wallichii Walp.
163. Argostemma wollastonii Wernham
164. Argostemma wrayi King
165. Argostemma yappii King
166. Argostemma yunnanense F.C.How ex S.H.Lo
