= Poortmannia =

Scientific classification
- Kingdom: Plantae
- Clade: Tracheophytes
- Clade: Angiosperms
- Clade: Eudicots
- Clade: Asterids
- Order: Solanales
- Family: Solanaceae
- Genus: Poortmannia; Drake
- Species: P. speciosa

Binomial name
- Poortmannia speciosa Drake

Synonyms
- Markea grandiflora Steyerm.; Trianaea neovisae Romero; Trianaea speciosa (Drake) Soler.; Trianaea spectabilis Cuatrec.

Species of flowering plant

Poortmannia is a genus of flowering plants belonging to the family Solanaceae. It is also in Solanoideae subfamily, tribe Solandreae Miers and also subtribe Juanulloinae. The genus has only one known species, Poortmannia speciosa Drake.

Its native range is tropical South America and it is found in the countries of Colombia, Ecuador and Peru. It is found in moist evergreen and montane forests at altitudes of 1,300–1,900 metres (4,300–6,200 ft) above sea level.

== Description ==
They are epiphytic shrubs, root-climbing lianas or small trees. It has cylindrical stems with verrucose bark. The leaves are coriaceous, 10–30 cm (4–12 in) long and elliptic, oblong or oblanceolate shaped, entire, abaxially prominently veined. The petiole (leaf stalk) is short and stout. The inflorescence are axillary with few flowered cymes. The pedicels (flower stalk) are shorter than the peduncles. The flowers are pendant-like, large, 5-merous, with valvate aestivation. The calyx is green, purplish tinged, campanulate (bell shaped), 5-keeled, lobes coriaceous, deltoid or lanceolate, free halfway to near the base. The corolla is green or greenish, campanulate, 5–15 cm (2–6 in) long, fleshy, lobes obtuse-deltoid, strongly reflexed. The stamens are slightly exserted and the filaments are ciliate, enlarged at base, inserted near the base of corolla, connivent around the straight style. The anthers are oblong, dorsifixed near the base. The nectary is fleshy and the ovary is 5-carpellate, 10-locular. The stigma is clavate and 5-lobed. The fruit (or seed capsule) is a large berry surrounded by the accrescent calyx. Inside the capsule, it has numerous elongated reniform seeds.

== Taxonomy ==
The genus name of Poortmannia is in honour of Hugo Anne Cornelis Poortman (1858–1953), Dutch garden architect; collected plants in Colombia and Ecuador; created various manor and castle gardens. The Latin specific epithet of speciosa means showy. Both the genus and the species were first described and published in Bull. Annuel Soc. Philom. Paris, séries 8, Vol.4 on page 128 in 1892.

The genus is not recognized by the United States Department of Agriculture and the Agricultural Research Service, as they class it as a synonym of Trianaea Planch. & Linden. As well as a few other sources, although a recent phylogenetic study by Orejuela et al., (2017) recognizes it as a distinct genus based on DNA sequences.
