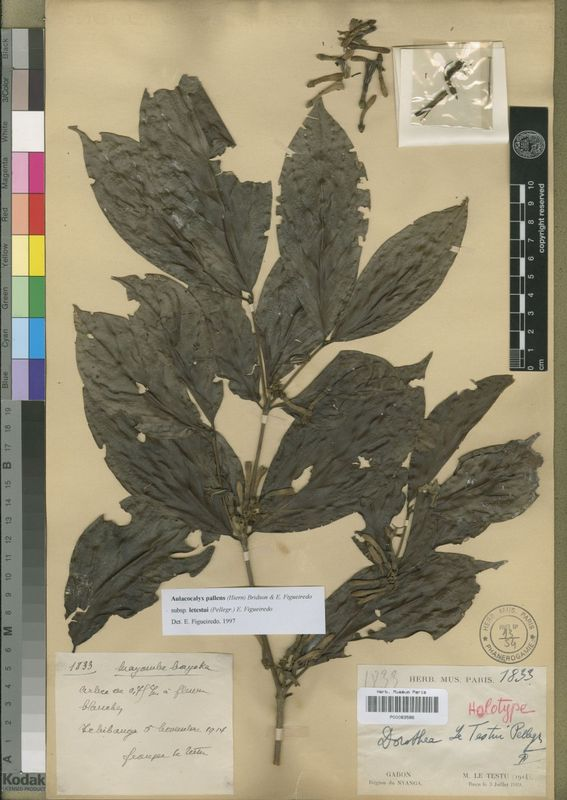
- Aulacocalyx pallens subsp. letestui

Conservation status
- Vulnerable (IUCN 3.1)

Scientific classification
- Kingdom: Plantae
- Clade: Embryophytes
- Clade: Tracheophytes
- Clade: Angiosperms
- Clade: Eudicots
- Clade: Asterids
- Order: Gentianales
- Family: Rubiaceae
- Genus: Aulacocalyx
- Species: A. pallens

Binomial name
- Aulacocalyx pallens (Hiern) Bridson & Figueiredo

Subspecies
- Aulacocalyx pallens subsp. letestui (Pellegr.) Figueiredo; Aulacocalyx pallens subsp. pallens

Synonyms
- Aidia pallens (Hiern) G.Taylor; Randia pallens Hiern

= Aulacocalyx pallens =

Species of flowering plant

Aulacocalyx pallens is a species of flowering plant in the family Rubiaceae. It is a tree with elliptical to obovate leaves, white flowers, and black fruits. The species is native to west-central Africa.

Aulacocalyx pallens was described in 1877, and is listed as Vulnerable by the IUCN.

== Taxonomy ==
Aulacocalyx pallens was described by William Philip Hiern in 1877, and initially placed in the genus Randia. In 1997, Diane Mary Bridson and Estrela Figueiredo moved it to the genus Aulacocalyx.

There are two recognised subspecies:

- Aulacocalyx pallens subsp. letestui (Pellegr.) Figueiredo - Native to the Democratic Republic of the Congo and Gabon
- Aulacocalyx pallens subsp. pallens - Native to São Tomé and Príncipe

== Distribution ==
Aulacocalyx pallens is native to the wet tropical biome of the Democratic Republic of the Congo, Gabon, and São Tomé. Its extent of occurrence is estimated as 1,047,370 square kilometres (404,390 sq mi).

The species grows in mature and secondary forests, at elevations of 180–1,100 metres (590–3,610 ft).

== Description ==
Aulacocalyx pallens is a tree that grows up to 18 metres (59 ft) high. The branches are striped, and covered with short, soft hairs. The leaves are elliptical to obovate, 11–16 centimetres (4.3–6.3 in) long, and 3.5–6.5 centimetres (1.4–2.6 in) wide. When dry, the leaves are olive, light green, or brown. The leaves have domatia. The leaf stems are 3–6 millimetres (0.12–0.24 in) long.

The inflorescences grow on 1.5–6 millimetres (0.059–0.236 in) stems, and usually have at least five flowers. The calyx tube is 2–2.5 millimetres (0.079–0.098 in) long, and has 0.2–0.5 millimetres (0.0079–0.0197 in) long lobes. The corolla is white, and 1.8–2.9 centimetres (0.71–1.14 in) long. The corolla has five elliptical to oblong lobes, which are 5–8 millimetres (0.20–0.31 in) long, and 2–2.8 millimetres (0.079–0.110 in) wide.

The fruits are 8–10 millimetres (0.31–0.39 in) wide, and black when dry. The seeds are 5–6 millimetres (0.20–0.24 in) long, around 5 millimetres (0.20 in) wide, and black when dry.

== Conservation ==
In 2020, the IUCN assessed Aulacocalyx pallens as Vulnerable. Some populations are threatened by agriculture. The species is present in Parque Natural Obô de São Tomé.
