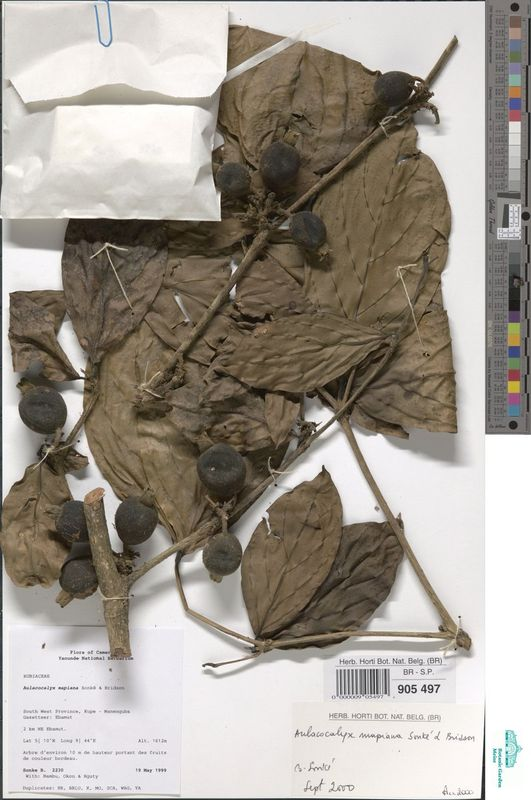

Conservation status
- Vulnerable (IUCN 3.1)

Scientific classification
- Kingdom: Plantae
- Clade: Embryophytes
- Clade: Tracheophytes
- Clade: Spermatophytes
- Clade: Angiosperms
- Clade: Eudicots
- Clade: Asterids
- Order: Gentianales
- Family: Rubiaceae
- Genus: Aulacocalyx
- Species: A. mapiana

Binomial name
- Aulacocalyx mapiana Sonké & Bridson

= Aulacocalyx mapiana =

Species of flowering plant

Aulacocalyx mapiana is a species of flowering plant in the family Rubiaceae. It is a shrub or tree native to Cameroon and Equatorial Guinea. The species was described in 2001, and is listed as Vulnerable by the IUCN.

== Taxonomy ==
The species was described by Bonaventure Sonké and Diane Mary Bridson in 2001.

== Distribution ==
Aulacocalyx mapiana is native to the wet tropical biome of Cameroon (Southwest Region and South Region) and Equatorial Guinea (Wele-Nzas). Its estimated extent of occurrence is 20,586 square kilometres (7,948 sq mi).

The species grows in evergreen, submontane forests (Cameroonian Highlands forests and Atlantic Equatorial coastal forests) at elevations of 200–1,600 metres (660–5,250 ft).

== Description ==
Aulacocalyx mapiana is a shrub or small tree. It grows up to 15 metres (49 ft) high.

== Conservation ==
In 2020, the IUCN listed Aulacocalyx mapiana as Vulnerable. The species is relatively rare. It is threatened by agriculture, logging, and mining.

The species is present in Banyang-Mbo Wildlife Sanctuary and Campo Ma'an National Park, and is found near the Rumpi Hills Wildlife Sanctuary.
