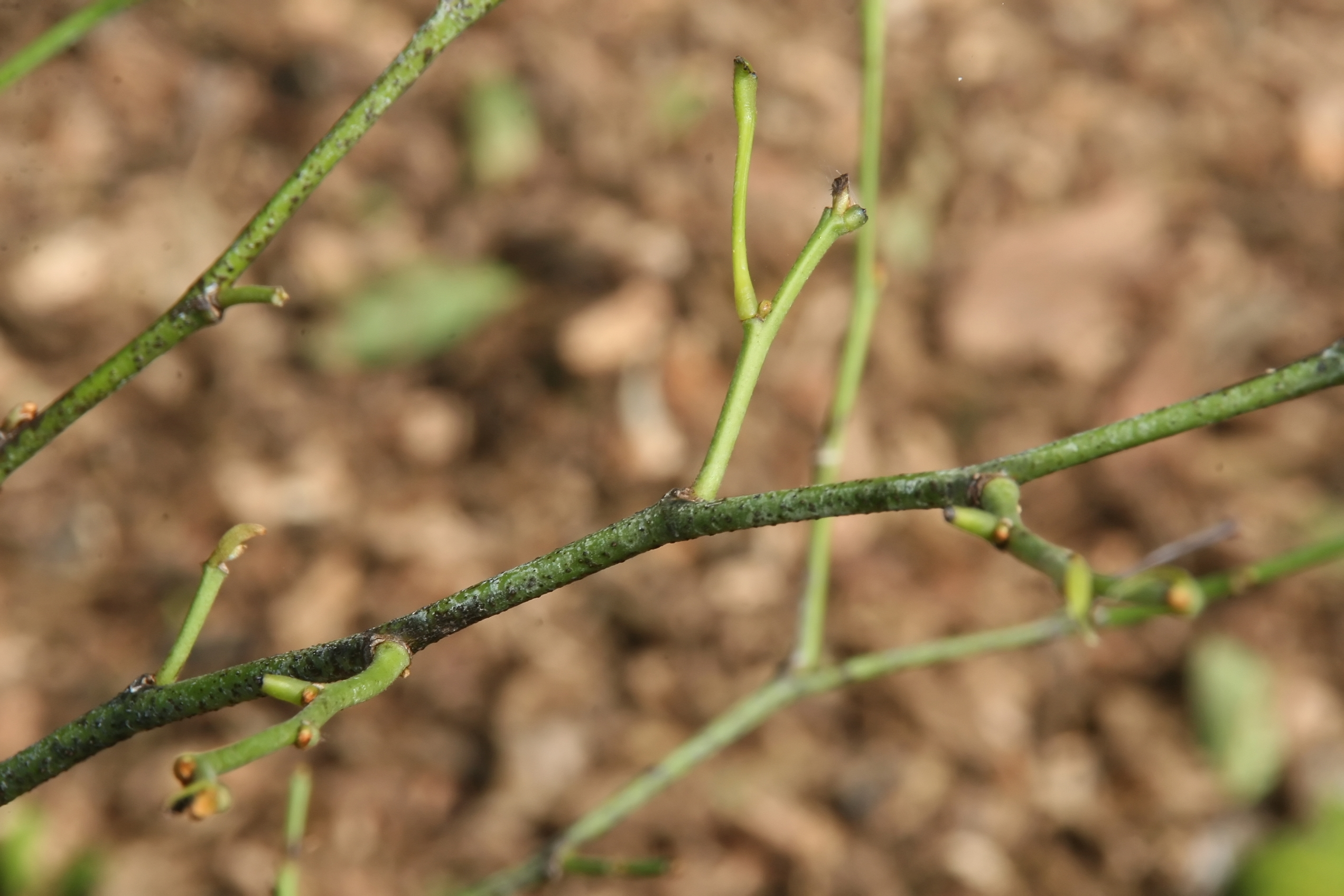

Conservation status
- Endangered (IUCN 3.1)

Scientific classification
- Kingdom: Plantae
- Clade: Tracheophytes
- Clade: Angiosperms
- Clade: Eudicots
- Clade: Rosids
- Order: Fabales
- Family: Fabaceae
- Genus: Gigasiphon
- Species: G. macrosiphon

Binomial name
- Gigasiphon macrosiphon (Harms) Brenan

Synonyms
- Bauhinia macrosiphon Harms

= Gigasiphon macrosiphon =

Species of legume

Gigasiphon macrosiphon is a species of plant in the family Fabaceae. It is known from several localities in Kenya and Tanzania. Only about 33 individuals were found in surveys in 2013. Population decline is believed to be mainly due to habitat loss. The IUCN currently classifies the species as Endangered.
