= Aulacocalyx lujae =

Conservation status
- Endangered (IUCN 3.1)

Scientific classification
- Kingdom: Plantae
- Clade: Tracheophytes
- Clade: Angiosperms
- Clade: Eudicots
- Clade: Asterids
- Order: Gentianales
- Family: Rubiaceae
- Genus: Aulacocalyx
- Species: A. lujae

Binomial name
- Aulacocalyx lujae De Wild.

Species of flowering plant

Aulacocalyx lujae (also spelled Aulacocalyx lujai) is a species of flowering plant in the family Rubiaceae. It is a shrub or tree with white flowers, that is native to west-central Africa. The species was described in 1915, and is listed as Endangered by the IUCN.

== Taxonomy ==
The species was described by Émile Auguste Joseph De Wildeman in 1915.

== Distribution ==
Aulacocalyx lujae is native to the wet tropical biome of Gabon, the Democratic Republic of the Congo, and the Republic of the Congo. Its extent of occurrence is around 225,370 square kilometres (87,020 sq mi). The species grows in rainforests, at elevations of 350–600 metres (1,150–1,970 ft).

== Description ==
Aulacocalyx lujae is a shrub or tree that grows up to 6 metres (20 ft) high. The branches are striped.

The leaves are 11–14 centimetres (4.3–5.5 in) long, 3.5–5.5 centimetres (1.4–2.2 in) wide, elliptical to lanceolate or oblanceolate, and light green to brown when dry. The leaf stem is 3–5 millimetres (0.12–0.20 in) long.

The inflorescence grows on a stem around 4 millimetres (0.16 in) long, and normally has five to twenty flowers. The calyx is 2.5–3 millimetres (0.098–0.118 in) long, and has triangular, 0.2–1 millimetre (0.0079–0.0394 in) long lobes. The corolla is 2.2–2.5 centimetres (0.87–0.98 in) long, and white. The corolla has five elliptical to lanceolate lobes, which are 7–9 millimetres (0.28–0.35 in) long, and 2.5–3 millimetres (0.098–0.118 in) wide.

== Conservation ==
In 2019, the IUCN listed Aulacocalyx lujae as Endangered. The species is threatened by agriculture and logging. One subpopulation is present in Lopé National Park, a protected area.

== Etymology ==
The species is named after the collector "Éd. Luja", and was originally published as Aulacocalyx lujai. The specific epithet was amended from "lujai" to "lujae", per article 60.8. of the International Code of Nomenclature for algae, fungi, and plants.
