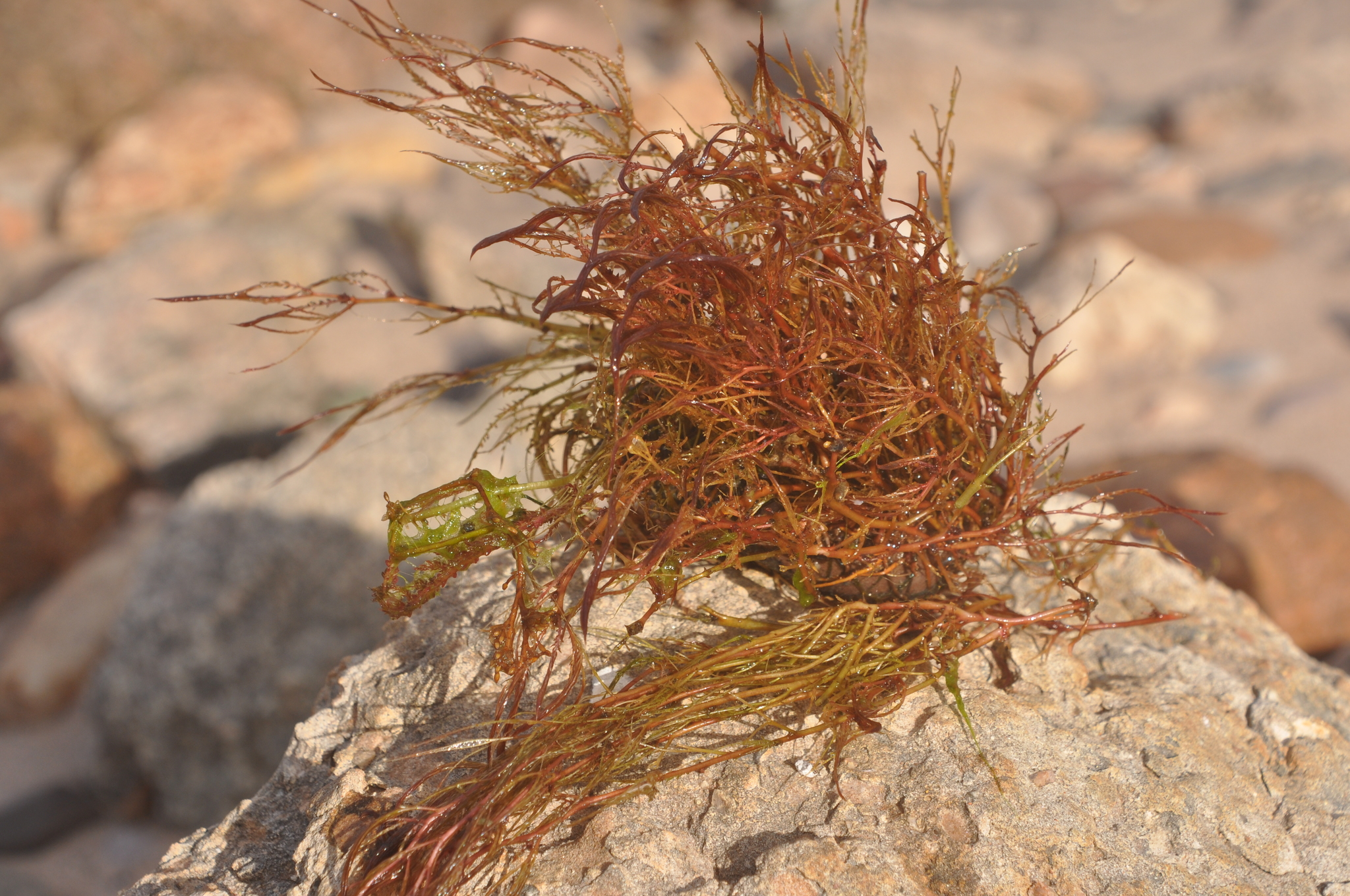
- Inversodicraea warmingiana

Scientific classification
- Kingdom: Plantae
- Clade: Embryophytes
- Clade: Tracheophytes
- Clade: Angiosperms
- Clade: Eudicots
- Clade: Rosids
- Order: Malpighiales
- Family: Podostemaceae
- Genus: Inversodicraea; Engl. ex R.E.Fr.

Species
- See text

= Inversodicraea =

Genus of flowering plants

Inversodicraea are a genus of flowering plants in the family Podostemaceae, found in Africa. They are confined to areas that receive a spray of water from waterfalls, and some species are confined to a single waterfall.

== Species ==
Currently accepted species include:

- Inversodicraea abbayesii G.Taylor
- Inversodicraea achoundongii J.J.Schenk, Herschlag & D.W.Thomas
- Inversodicraea adamesii G.Taylor
- Inversodicraea annithomae (C.Cusset) Rutish. & Thiv
- Inversodicraea boumiensis (C.Cusset) Cheek
- Inversodicraea congolana Hauman
- Inversodicraea cristata Engl.
- Inversodicraea cussetiana (Cheek & Ameka) Cheek
- Inversodicraea digitata H.E.Hess
- Inversodicraea ebo Cheek
- Inversodicraea eladii Cheek
- Inversodicraea feika Cheek
- Inversodicraea fluitans H.E.Hess
- Inversodicraea gabonensis (C.Cusset) Cheek
- Inversodicraea harrisii (C.Cusset) Cheek
- Inversodicraea kamerunensis (Engl.) Engl.
- Inversodicraea koukoutamba Cheek
- Inversodicraea ledermannii (Engl.) Engl.
- Inversodicraea liberia Cheek
- Inversodicraea mortonii (C.Cusset) Cheek
- Inversodicraea ntemensis (Y.Kita, Koi, Rutish. & M.Kato) J.J.Schenk, Herschlag & D.W.Thomas
- Inversodicraea paulsitae (C.Cusset) Cheek
- Inversodicraea pepehabae Cheek
- Inversodicraea pygmaea G.Taylor
- Inversodicraea tassing Cheek
- Inversodicraea tchoutoi Cheek
- Inversodicraea tenax (C.H.Wright) Engl. ex R.E.Fr.
- Inversodicraea thollonii (Baill.) Cheek
- Inversodicraea torrei (C.Cusset) Cheek
- Inversodicraea warmingiana (Gilg) Engl.
- Inversodicraea xanderi Cheek
