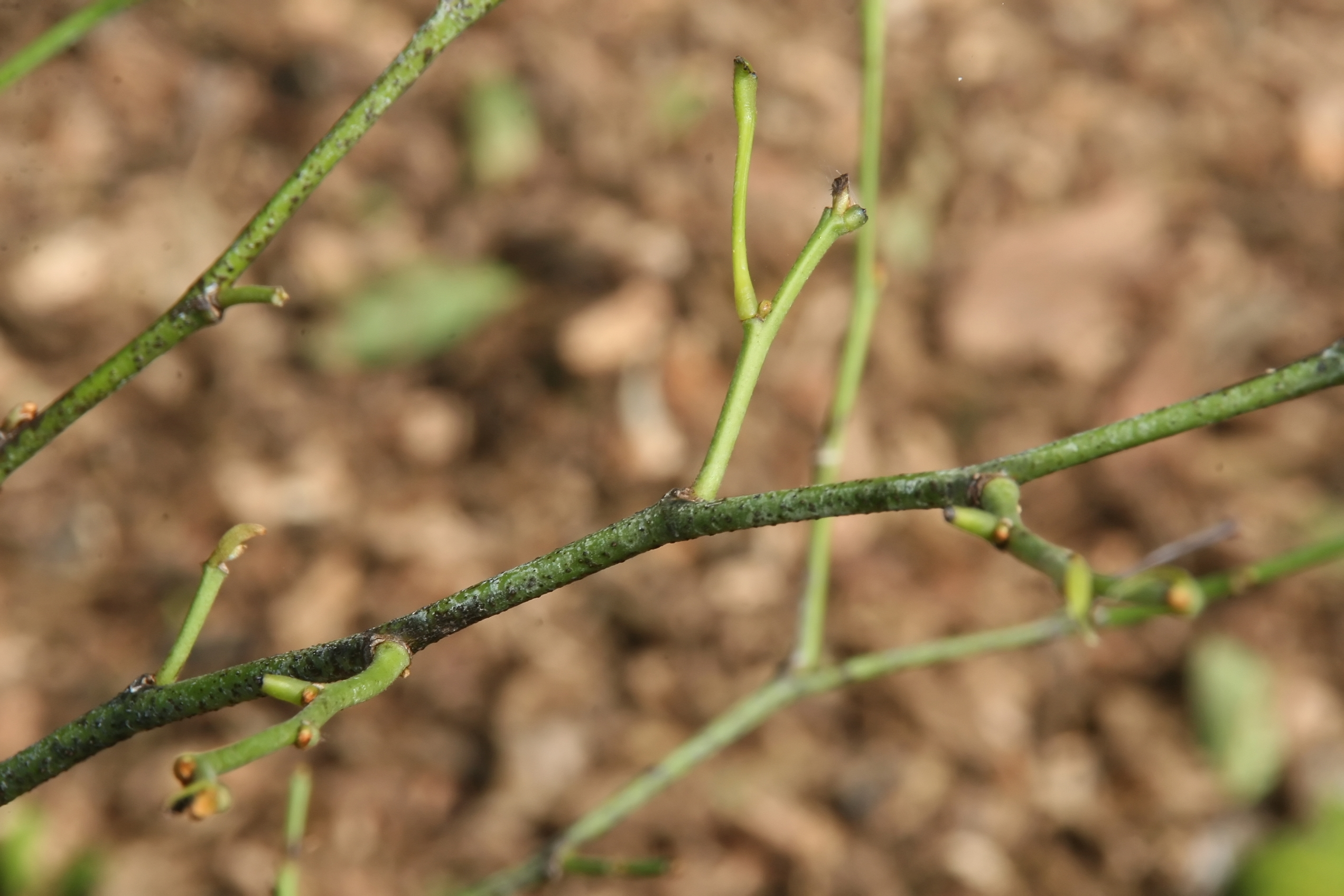
- Gigasiphon macrosiphon

Scientific classification
- Kingdom: Plantae
- Clade: Tracheophytes
- Clade: Angiosperms
- Clade: Eudicots
- Clade: Rosids
- Order: Fabales
- Family: Fabaceae
- Subfamily: Cercidoideae
- Tribe: Bauhinieae
- Genus: Gigasiphon; Drake

Type species
- Gigasiphon humblotianum (Baill.) Drake

Species
- 5; see text

= Gigasiphon =

Genus of legumes

Gigasiphon is a genus of plants in the family Fabaceae. The genus is circumscribed is defined by "a long-tubular hypanthium, an arborescent habit, and a calyx divided into two lobes". It includes five species native to eastern Africa, Madagascar, the Philippines, New Guinea, and Lesser Sunda Islands.

== Species ==
Gigasiphon comprises the following species:

- Gigasiphon amplum (Span.) de Wit
- Gigasiphon dolichocalyx (Merr.) de Wit
- Gigasiphon humblotianum (Baill.) Drake
- Gigasiphon macrosiphon (Harms) Brenan
- Gigasiphon schlechteri (Harms) de Wit

Note: Gigasiphon gossweileri is now in the African monotypic genus Tournaya
