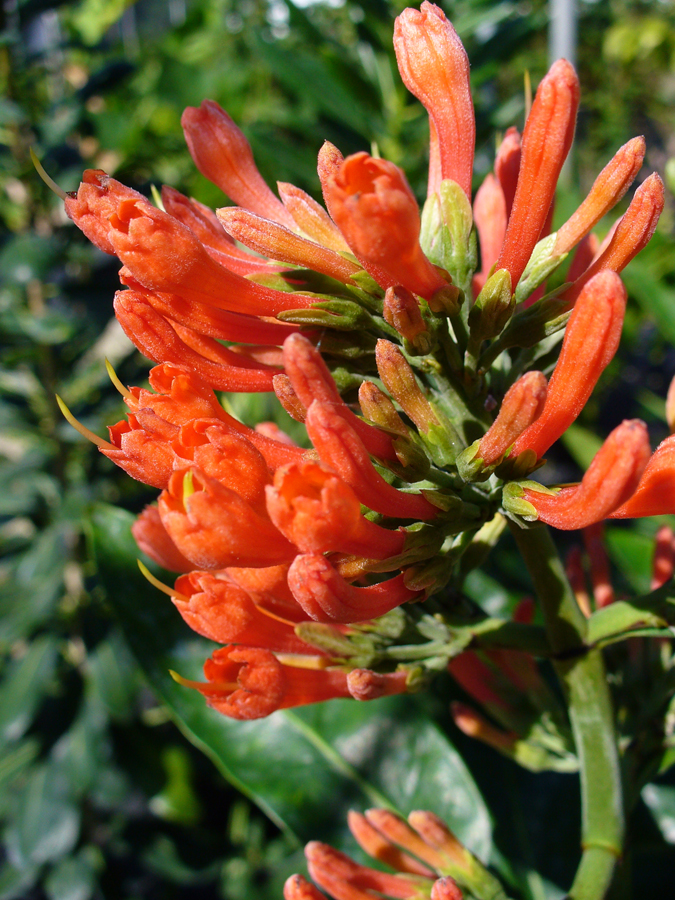
- Alberta magna

Scientific classification
- Kingdom: Plantae
- Clade: Tracheophytes
- Clade: Angiosperms
- Clade: Eudicots
- Clade: Asterids
- Order: Gentianales
- Family: Rubiaceae
- Subfamily: Ixoroideae
- Tribe: Alberteae; Hook.f.

Type genus
- Alberta E.Mey.

= Alberteae =

Tribe of plants

Alberteae is a tribe of flowering plants in the family Rubiaceae and contains about 18 species in 3 genera. Its representatives are found in tropical and southern Africa and in Madagascar.

== Genera ==
Currently accepted names

- Alberta E.Mey. (1 sp)
- Aulacocalyx Hook.f. (12 sp)
- Razafimandimbisonia Kainul. & B.Bremer (5 sp)

Synonyms

- Dorothea Wernham = Aulacocalyx
- Ernestimeyera Kuntze = Alberta
