= Anne-Marie Homolle =

French botanist

Anne-Marie Homolle (1912–2006), was a French botanist noted for studying and collecting plants of Madagascar. She identified at least 260 species of plants native to Madagascar, and two genera were named in her honor: Homollea (in the family Rubiaceae) and Homolliella (now a synonym of Paracephaelis Baill.).

The standard author abbreviation Homolle is used to indicate this person as the author when citing a botanical name.
