= Heinsenia =

Scientific classification
- Kingdom: Plantae
- Clade: Tracheophytes
- Clade: Angiosperms
- Clade: Eudicots
- Clade: Asterids
- Order: Gentianales
- Family: Rubiaceae
- Subfamily: Ixoroideae
- Tribe: Gardenieae
- Genus: Heinsenia; K.Schum.
- Species: H. diervilleoides

Binomial name
- Heinsenia diervilleoides K.Schum.

Genus of plants

Heinsenia is a monotypic genus of plants, shrubs or small trees growing in Africa. Its only species is Heinsenia diervilleoides. The Royal Botanic Gardens, Kew collected a specimen.
