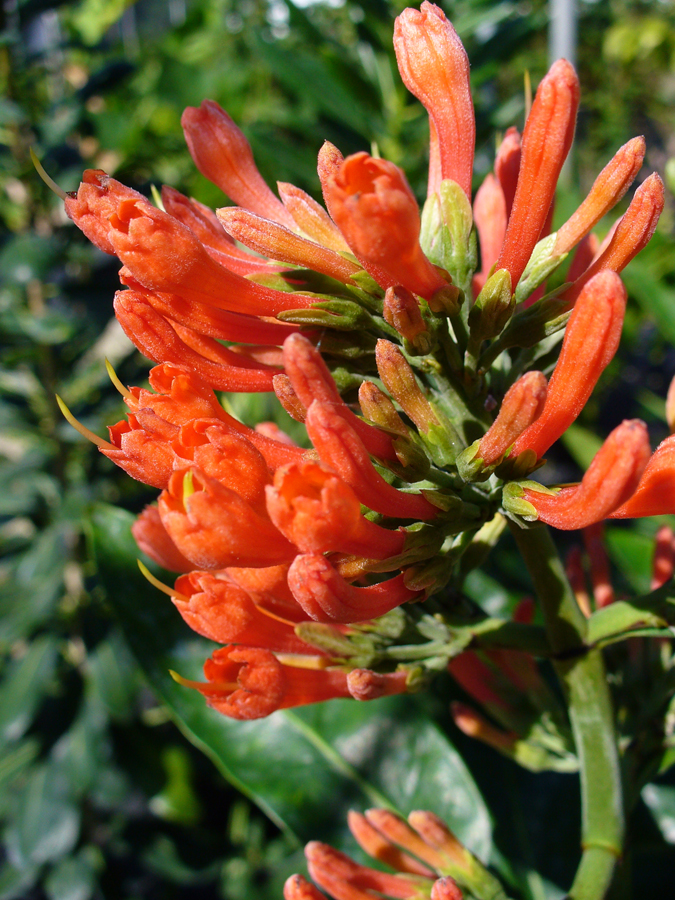

Conservation status
- Near Threatened (IUCN 3.1)

Scientific classification
- Kingdom: Plantae
- Clade: Embryophytes
- Clade: Tracheophytes
- Clade: Spermatophytes
- Clade: Angiosperms
- Clade: Eudicots
- Clade: Asterids
- Order: Gentianales
- Family: Rubiaceae
- Subfamily: Ixoroideae
- Tribe: Alberteae
- Genus: Alberta; E.Mey.
- Species: A. magna

Binomial name
- Alberta magna E.Mey.

Synonyms
- Ernestimeyera Kuntze

= Alberta magna =

Natal flame bush

Species of plant

Alberta is a monotypic genus of flowering plants in the family Rubiaceae. Most species have been transferred to the genus Razafimandimbisonia, except for the type species Alberta magna. It is native to KwaZulu-Natal, South Africa and is commonly known as Natal flame bush.

== Taxonomy ==
The genus Alberta was shown to be paraphyletic in a phylogenetic analysis of the tribe Alberteae. The type species Alberta magna is set apart from the Malagasy Alberta species that are now included in the genus Razafimandimbisonia.
