= Ronald William John Keay =

British botanist (1920–1998)

Ronald William John Keay CBE
- Born: 20 May 1920; Richmond Surrey, London, England
- Died: 7 April 1998 (aged 77)
- Education: University of Oxford
- Scientific career
- Fields: Botany
- Author abbrev. (botany): Keay

Ronald William John Keay (20 May 1920 – 7 April 1998) was a British botanist, who did much of his work in tropical Africa.

Keay was educated at the University of Oxford. He was an expert in West African forest flora working at the Royal Botanic Gardens, Kew, and at the Forest Herbarium Ibadan (FHI), part of the Forestry Research Institute of Nigeria (FRIN), and was director of that institute from 1960 to 1962. He collected specimens in Rhodesia, Nigeria, West Cameroon, the Congo, Rhodesia and Zambia.

During the 1970s and '80s he was a member, council member, treasurer and vice president of the Royal Society. After his retirement from the Royal Society he served as president of the Institute of Biology and also the treasurer of the Linnean Society of London.

== Publications ==
=== Books ===
- Keay, RWJ (1989). Trees of Nigeria. Oxford University Press. ISBN 0198545606.
- Hutchinson J; Dalziel JM; Keay RWJ (1973). Flora of West Tropical Africa, Volume 1, Part 2. MillBank Crown Agents for Overseas Governments & Administrations. ISBN 0855920270. OCLC 833210804.
- Richards P.W.; Keay R.W.J.; Aubréville A. (1959). Vegetation Map of Africa South of the Tropic of Cancer. Association pour l'étude taxonomique de la flore d'Afrique tropicale.
- Levaux, P.; Brown, D.A.; Keay, Ronald W.J. (1984). Evaluation of the Community's Programme Scientific and Technical Training (Science and Technology). ISBN 92-825-4508-3.
- Hutchinson, John; Dalziel, John McEwen; Keay, Ronald W.J.; Hepper, F.N. (1963). Flora of West Tropical Africa: The British West African Territories, Liberia, the French and Portuguese Territories South of Latitude 18 ̊N. to Lake Chad, and Fernando Po. Vol. 2 of Flora of west tropical Africa (2nd ed.). Crown Agents for Oversea Governments and Administrations. 544 pp.
- Dalziel, J.M.; Hutchinson, J.; Keay, Ronald W.J. (1954). Glossary of Botanical Terms (Reprinted from The Flora of West Tropical Africa, for J. Hutchinson ... & J. M. Dalziel ... 2nd ed. revised by R.W.J.Keay ed.).
- Jones, A.P.D.; Keay, Ronald W.J. (1948). The Natural Forest Inviolate Plot. Akure Forest Reserve, Ondo Province, Nigeria.

=== Conference proceedings ===
- Garlick, James Patton; Keay, Ronald William John (1970). Human ecology in the tropics. Vol. 9 Symposia of the Society for the Study of Human Biology. Pergamon Press. 112 pp.
- Keay, RWJ (1949). An Outline of Nigerian Vegetation. Lagos: Government Printer.

== Species named in his honour ==
- Habenaria keayi Summerh., Bot. Mus. Leafl. 14: 217 (1951).
- Ledermanniella keayi (G.Taylor) C.Cusset, Adansonia sér. 2, 14(2): 274 (1974). (basionym: Inversodicraea keayi G.Taylor, Bull. Brit. Mus. (Nat. Hist.), Bot. 1: 78 (1953) Fig. 14
