= Alberto Cavaco =

- Born: Alberto Júdice Leote Cavaco; August 4, 1915; Tavira, Algarve, Portugal
- Died: June 1, 2001 (aged 85); Cascais, Lisbon District, Portugal
- Education: University of Coimbra; University of Montpellier
- Known for: Taxonomy of vascular plants
- Scientific career
- Fields: Botany

Alberto Júdice Leote Cavaco (4 August 1915 – 1 June 2001) was a Portuguese botanist. The standard author abbreviation Cavaco is used to indicate this person as the author when citing a botanical name.

== Career ==
After completing his studies at the University of Coimbra, Cavaco worked as an assistant to António Rocha da Torre in Mozambique during the Botanical Mission of Mozambique, led by Francisco Mendonça. The Willdenowia expedition lasted seven months, with the team divided into smaller groups. Torre and Cavaco conducted research in the Save River region, collecting over 1,080 specimens under Torre's name.

Cavaco later worked at the Laboratoire Arago in Banyuls-sur-Mer, France, and subsequently earned a doctorate at the University of Montpellier. He became a research master at the National Museum of Natural History in Paris, where he established and developed various scientific activities.

Until the late 1970s, he collaborated with the Faculty of Sciences, University of Lisbon and was involved with the Portuguese Society of Natural Sciences. He is honored in two plant names: the genus Cavacoa J. Léonard (1955: 320) and Schizolaena cavacoana Lowry & al. (1999: 193).
