= Emmanuel Drake del Castillo =

French botanist (1855–1904)

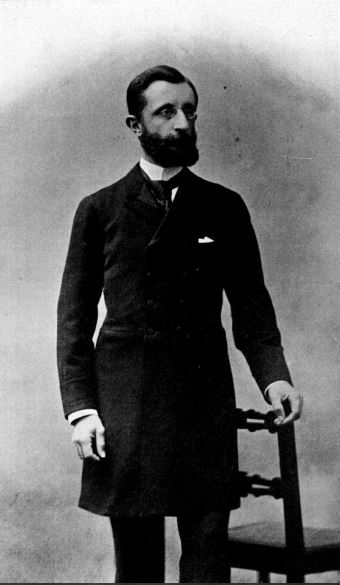
- Born: 28 December 1855; Paris, France
- Died: 14 May 1904 (aged 48); Saint-Cyran-du-Jambot, France
- Citizenship: French
- Scientific career
- Fields: Botany
- Workplaces: Muséum national d'histoire naturelle
- Academic advisors: Louis Édouard Bureau
- Author abbrev. (botany): Drake

Emmanuel Drake del Castillo (28 December 1855 – 14 May 1904) was a French botanist.

He was born at Paris and studied with Louis Édouard Bureau (1830–1918) at the Muséum national d'histoire naturelle (National Museum of Natural History). Between 1886 and 1892, he published Illustrationes Florae Insulae Maris Pacifici ("Illustrations of the flora of the islands of the Pacific Ocean") a summarization of his work on the flora of French Polynesia. He also studied the flora of Madagascar.

In addition, he put together a herbarium which contained more than 500,000 samples. He died in 1904 at Saint-Cyran-du-Jambot, bequeathing his herbarium to the Muséum national d'histoire naturelle.

== Taxa ==
He was the taxonomic authority of numerous plants. The following is a list of botanical genera that he described:

- Alluaudia, family Didiereaceae
- Apaloxylon, family Leguminosae
- Bathiaea, family Leguminosae
- Cullumiopsis, family Asteraceae (now classed a synonym of Macledium Cass. )
- Gigasiphon, family Leguminosae
- Leptomischus, family Rubiaceae
- Poortmannia, family Solanaceae.

== Partial bibliography ==
- Illustrationes florae insularum Maris Pacifici / Paris: G. Masson, 1886–1892.
- Histoire naturelle des plantes (de Madagascar) T. 1, 3–6, / Emmanuel Drake del Castillo, Henri Baillon / Paris : impr. nationale, 1886-1902 - Natural history of plants (Madagascar).
- Remarques sur la flore de la Polynésie et sur ses rapports avec celle des terres voisines / Paris: G. Masson, 1890 - Notes on the flora of Polynesia and its relationship with other lands.
- Flore de la Polynésie française : description des plantes vasculaires qui croissent spontanément ou qui sont généralement cultivées aux Iles de la Société, Marquise, Pomotou, Gambier et Wallis / Paris: Masson, 1892 - Flora of French Polynesia; description of vascular plants that are native or are generally grown in the Society Islands, Marquesas Islands, Gambier Islands and Wallis Islands.
