= Yellow mangosteen =

Yellow mangostine mangosteen is a common name for several plants with round, edible fruits:

- Garcinia xanthochymus, found in India, Southeast Asia, and Japan
- Garcinia dulcis, found in Southeast Asia
- Atractocarpus fitzalanii, not closely related to Garcinia but with similar-looking fruit
