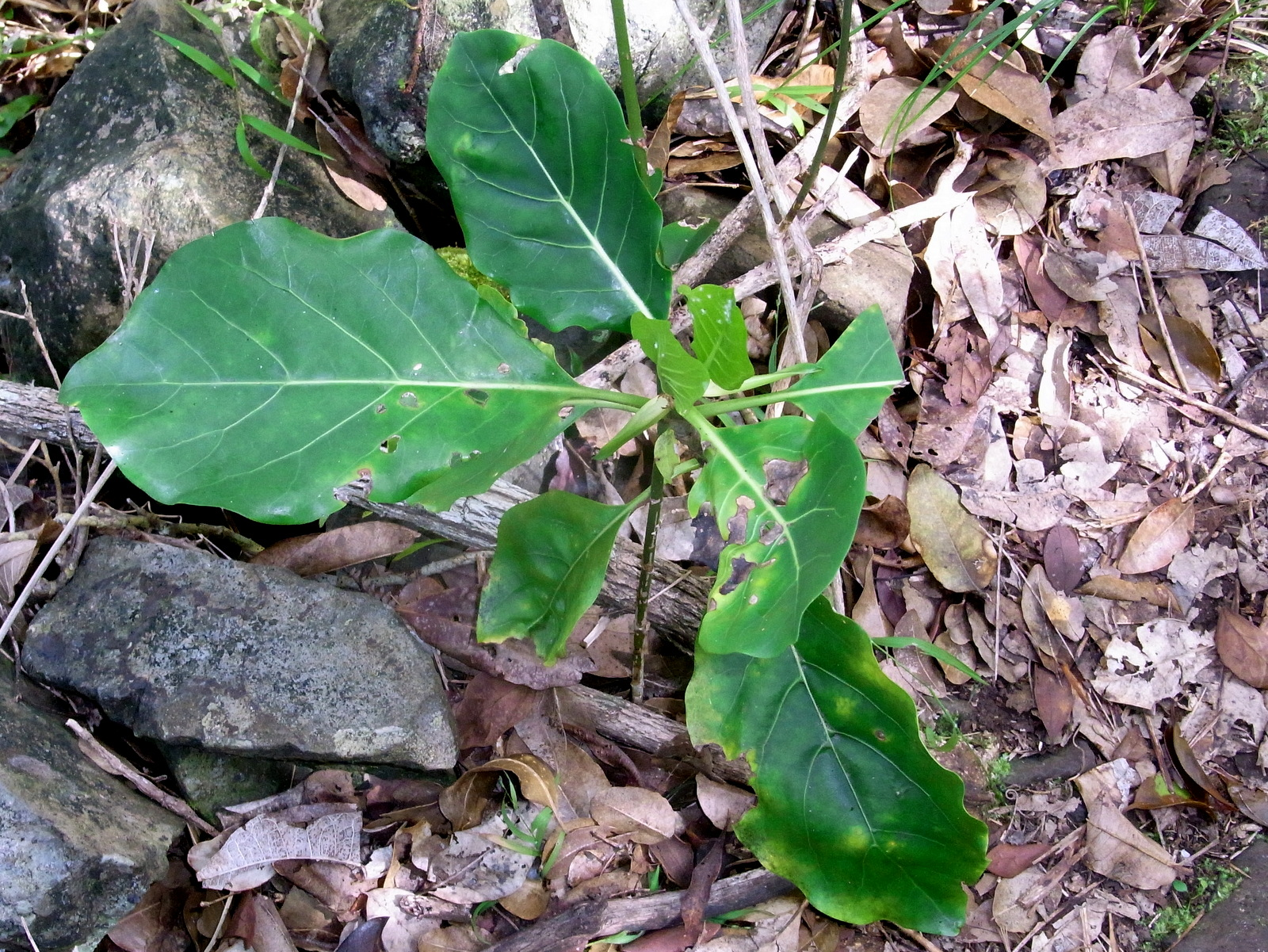

Scientific classification
- Kingdom: Plantae
- Clade: Tracheophytes
- Clade: Angiosperms
- Clade: Eudicots
- Clade: Asterids
- Order: Gentianales
- Family: Rubiaceae
- Genus: Atractocarpus
- Species: A. stipularis

Binomial name
- Atractocarpus stipularis (F.Muell.) Puttock ex P.S.Green (1990)

Synonyms
- Gardenia stipulosa F.Muell. (1869); Randia stipulosa C.Moore & F.Muell. (1869); Randia stipularis F.Muell. (1876); Trukia stipularis (F.Muell.) P.S.Green ex Hutton (1986)

= Atractocarpus stipularis =

Green plum

Species of plant

Atractocarpus stipularis, commonly known as the green plum, is a flowering plant in the coffee family Rubiaceae. The specific epithet alludes to its large stipules.

== Description ==
Atractocarpus stipularis is a small, rounded, sparsely branched tree growing to 3–12 m (9.8–39.4 ft) in height. The smooth, ovate leaves are 12–30 cm (4.7–11.8 in) long and 8–24 cm (3.1–9.4 in) wide. The inflorescences are cymose and are produced in the leaf axils. They bear fragrant white flowers—males with 20 or more, females with 2 or 3. The yellow-green fruits are about 3.4 cm (1.3 in) long. The flowering season is from early November to late February.

== Distribution and habitat ==
Atractocarpus stipularis is endemic to Lord Howe Island in the Tasman Sea, 600 km (370 mi) east of the New South Wales mainland. It is widespread in sheltered sites at all elevations on the island.
