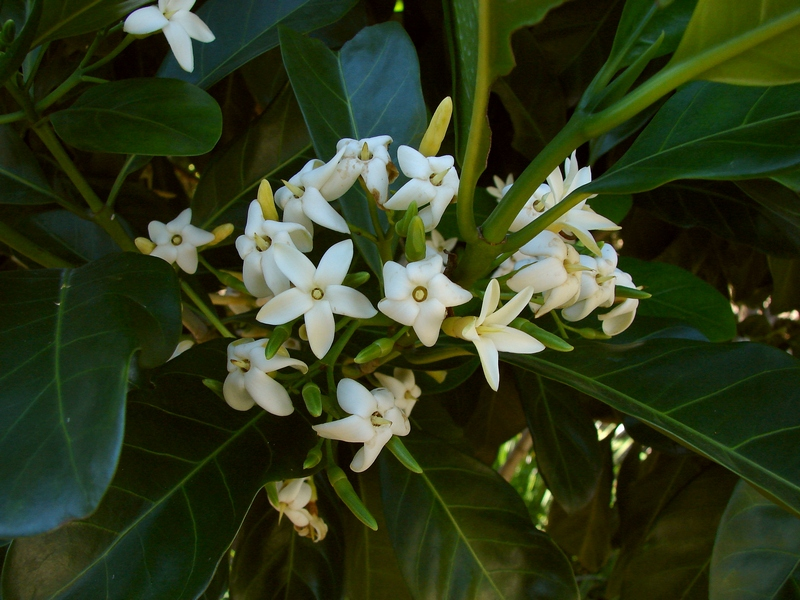
- Atractocarpus fitzalanii

Scientific classification
- Kingdom: Plantae
- Clade: Tracheophytes
- Clade: Angiosperms
- Clade: Eudicots
- Clade: Asterids
- Order: Gentianales
- Family: Rubiaceae
- Subfamily: Ixoroideae
- Tribe: Gardenieae
- Genus: Atractocarpus; Schltr. & K.Krause

Type species
- Atractocarpus bracteatus Schltr. & K.Krause

Synonyms
- Franciella Guillaumin; Neofranciella Guillaumin; Sukunia A.C.Sm.; Sulitia Merr.; Trukia Kaneh.

= Atractocarpus =

Genus of flowering plants

Atractocarpus is a genus of flowering plants in the family Rubiaceae. Its members are commonly known as native gardenias in Australia. The genus name is derived from the Ancient Greek terms atractos "spindle", and karpos "fruit", from the spindle-shaped fruit of the type species.

== Taxonomy ==
Defined by botanists Rudolf Schlechter and Kurt Krause in 1908, the type species is Atractocarpus bracteatus, which is found only on New Caledonia. Subsequently, several other species were described from New Caledonia.

Meanwhile, the genera Randia and Gardenia had been used as wastebasket taxa, where many species that had been difficult to place had been placed by default. Several Australian species of the genus Randia were found to be not closely related to Neotropical species and were transferred in a review of the genera by Australian botanist Christopher Puttock in 1999; these include several garden plant species such as A. benthamianus, A. chartaceus, and A. fitzalanii.

Puttock also proposed that the genera Sukunia, Trukia, Neofranciella, and Sulitia (the last two consisting of once species each) be sunk into Atractocarpus. The resulting genus now contains around forty species, with seven found in Australia, and others in the Federated States of Micronesia, the Philippines, New Guinea, the Solomon Islands, Vanuatu, New Caledonia, Fiji, Tonga, and east to Tahiti. All species are found in a type of lowland rainforest known as mesophyll vine forests, as well as swamp forests and vine thickets.

== Species ==
The following 40 species are accepted by Plants of the World Online as of March 2023

- Atractocarpus aragoensis Guillaumin
- Atractocarpus artensis (Montrouz.) Mouly
- Atractocarpus baladicus (Montrouz. ex Guillaumin & Beauvis.) Mouly
- Atractocarpus benthamianus (F.Muell.) Puttock
- Atractocarpus bracteatus Schltr. & K.Krause
- Atractocarpus brandzeanus (Baill.) Mouly
- Atractocarpus carolinensis (Valeton) Puttock
- Atractocarpus chartaceus (F.Muell.) Puttock
- Atractocarpus colnettianus (Guillaumin) Mouly
- Atractocarpus confertus (Guillaumin) Mouly
- Atractocarpus crosbyi (Burkill) Puttock
- Atractocarpus cucumicarpus S.Moore
- Atractocarpus decorus (Valeton) Puttock
- Atractocarpus deplanchei (Vieill. ex Guillaumin) Mouly
- Atractocarpus fitzalanii (F.Muell.) Puttock
- Atractocarpus heterophyllus (Montrouz.) Guillaumin & Beauvis.
- Atractocarpus hirtus (F.Muell.) Puttock
- Atractocarpus longipes (A.C.Sm.) Puttock
- Atractocarpus longistipitatus Guillaumin
- Atractocarpus macarthurii (F.Muell.) Puttock
- Atractocarpus merikin (F.M.Bailey) Puttock
- Atractocarpus mollis (Schltr.) Mouly
- Atractocarpus ngoyensis (Schltr.) Mouly
- Atractocarpus nigricans (Schltr.) Mouly
- Atractocarpus oblongus S.Moore
- Atractocarpus obscurinervius (Merr.) Puttock
- Atractocarpus pancherianus (Guillaumin) Mouly
- Atractocarpus pentagonioides (Seem.) Puttock
- Atractocarpus platixylon (Vieill. ex Pancher & Sebert) Guillaumin
- Atractocarpus pseudoterminalis (Guillaumin) Mouly
- Atractocarpus pterocarpon (Guillaumin) Puttock
- Atractocarpus rotundifolius Guillaumin
- Atractocarpus sessilis (F.Muell.) Puttock
- Atractocarpus sezitat (Guillaumin) Mouly
- Atractocarpus simulans Guillaumin
- Atractocarpus stipularis (F.Muell.) Puttock ex P.S.Green
- Atractocarpus tahitiensis (Nadeaud) Puttock
- Atractocarpus tenuiflorus (A.C.Sm.) Puttock
- Atractocarpus vaginatus Guillaumin
- Atractocarpus versteegii (Valeton) Puttock
