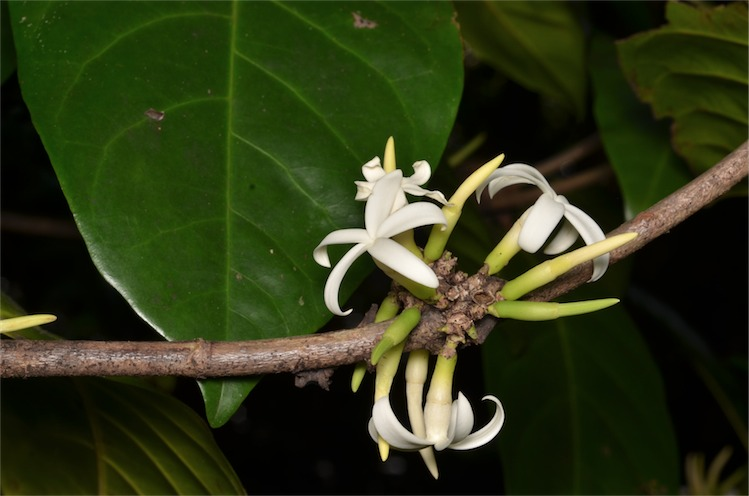
- Inflorescence

Conservation status
- Least Concern (NCA)
- Least Concern (IUCN 3.1)

Scientific classification
- Kingdom: Plantae
- Clade: Embryophytes
- Clade: Tracheophytes
- Clade: Angiosperms
- Clade: Eudicots
- Clade: Asterids
- Order: Gentianales
- Family: Rubiaceae
- Genus: Atractocarpus
- Species: A. sessilis

Binomial name
- Atractocarpus sessilis (F.Muell.) Puttock

Synonyms
- Randia sessilis F.Muell.; Gardenia sessilis F.Muell.

= Atractocarpus sessilis =

Brown randia

Species of flowering plant

Atractocarpus sessilis, commonly known as brown randia, is an evergreen shrub in the family Rubiaceae. It is native to both Queensland, Australia, and Papua New Guinea (PNG).

== Description ==
Atractocarpus sessilis is a much branched shrub or small tree growing to about 15 m (49 ft) tall with a silver-grey trunk about 25 cm (9.8 in) diameter. The leaves are simple, arranged in opposite pairs on the twigs, glossy dark green above and duller below. Mature sun leaves may be 33 cm (13 in) long and 14 cm (5.5 in) wide, shade leaves are smaller. They are coriaceous, obovate to broadly elliptic in shape, and are held on petioles that may be up to 25 mm (1 in) long. They have 6–10 pairs of secondary veins that depart from the midrib at an angle between 55–65°, and reticulate tertiary venation.

The inflorescences are produced in the leaf axils, and as this species is dioecious, male and female flowers are borne on separate plants. Male inflorescences may have 15 or more flowers in a fascicle, while female inflorescences rarely have more than one flower. The flowers are sessile, meaning that there is no supporting stem and they attach directly to the twigs. They are white with five recurved petals measuring up to 18 mm (0.7 in) long and 5 mm (0.2 in) wide; the calyx tube is 8 to 10 mm (0.3 to 0.4 in) long and the corolla tube is 10 to 15 mm (0.4 to 0.6 in) long.

The fruit is a drupe, ellipsoid (like a rugby ball) or ovoid (like a chicken egg) in shape, measuring up to 60 mm (2.4 in) long by 50 mm (2.0 in) diameter, with a persistent calyx at the distal end. They are a dull rusty or ochre colour when mature with a scurfy exterior, and contain numerous seeds measuring about 6 by 7 mm (0.2 by 0.3 in).

== Taxonomy ==
This species was first described as Randia sessilis by the German-born Australian botanist Ferdinand von Mueller in his massive work Fragmenta phytographiæ Australiæ. He based his description on a collection of plant material from Cape York Peninsula. In 1999, a review of the genus Atractocarpus in Australia was published by another Australian botanist, Christopher Francis Puttock, in which he gave this species the new combination Atractocarpus sessilis.

=== Etymology ===
The genus name Atractocarpus is derived from the Ancient Greek terms átraktos, meaning "spindle", and karpós meaning "fruit", and refers to the spindle-shaped fruit of the type species. The species epithet sessilis refers to the sessile flowers.

== Distribution and habitat ==
The brown randia is native to Australia and Papua New Guinea. In Australia it occurs from the area near Mount Molloy, Queensland, north to the top of Cape York Peninsula, while in PNG it is found in the areas adjacent to Cape York in the vicinity of the Fly River. It typically grows in monsoon forest, beach forest and rainforest, at altitudes from sea level up to 550 m (1,800 ft).

== Conservation ==
This species is listed by the Queensland Department of Environment and Science and the International Union for Conservation of Nature (IUCN) as least concern. In support of its assessment, the IUCN states that while the total extent of occurrence of the species is more than 2 million square kilometres, threats exist in PNG but their impact is not known.

== Gallery ==
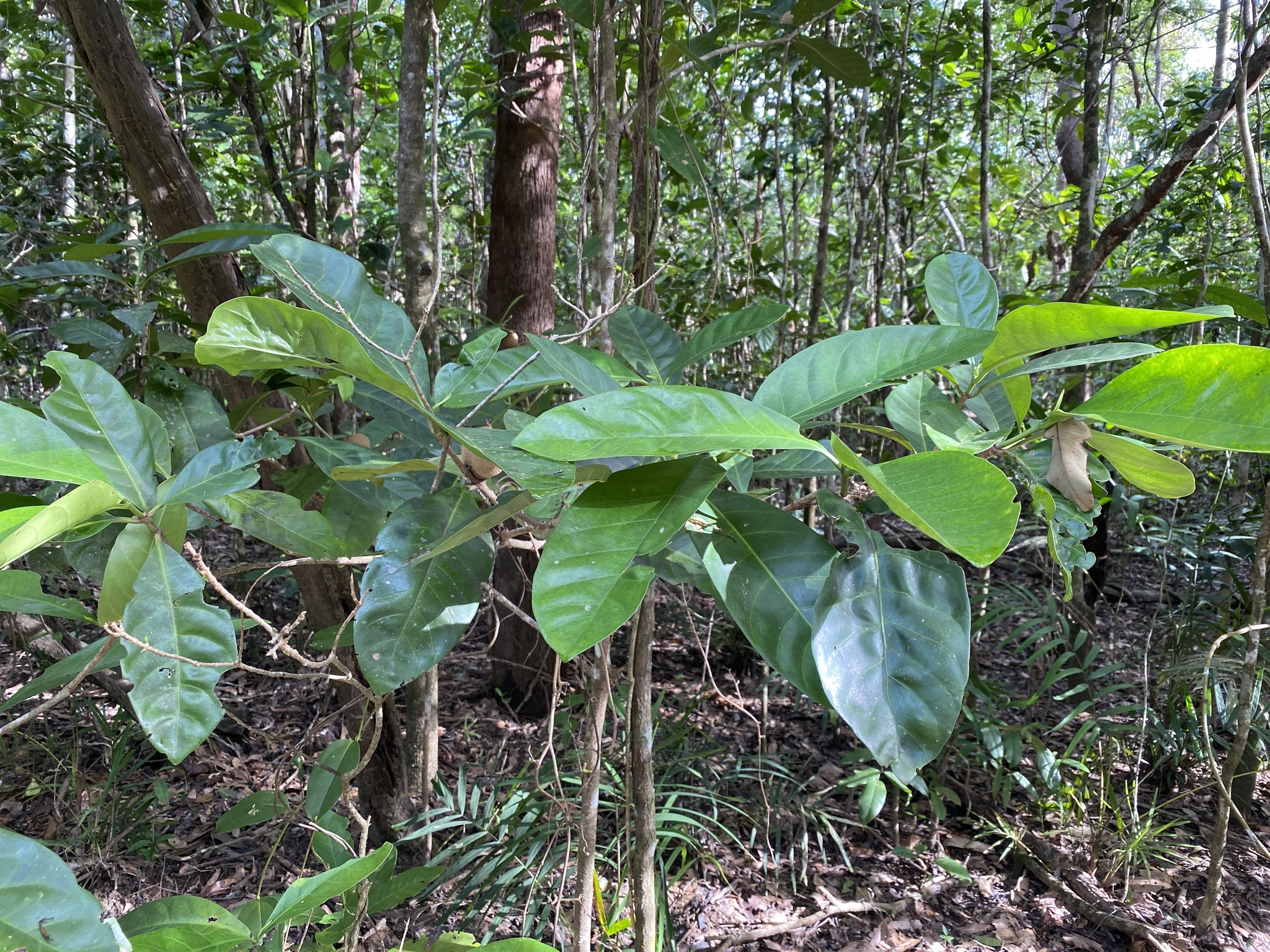
Habit

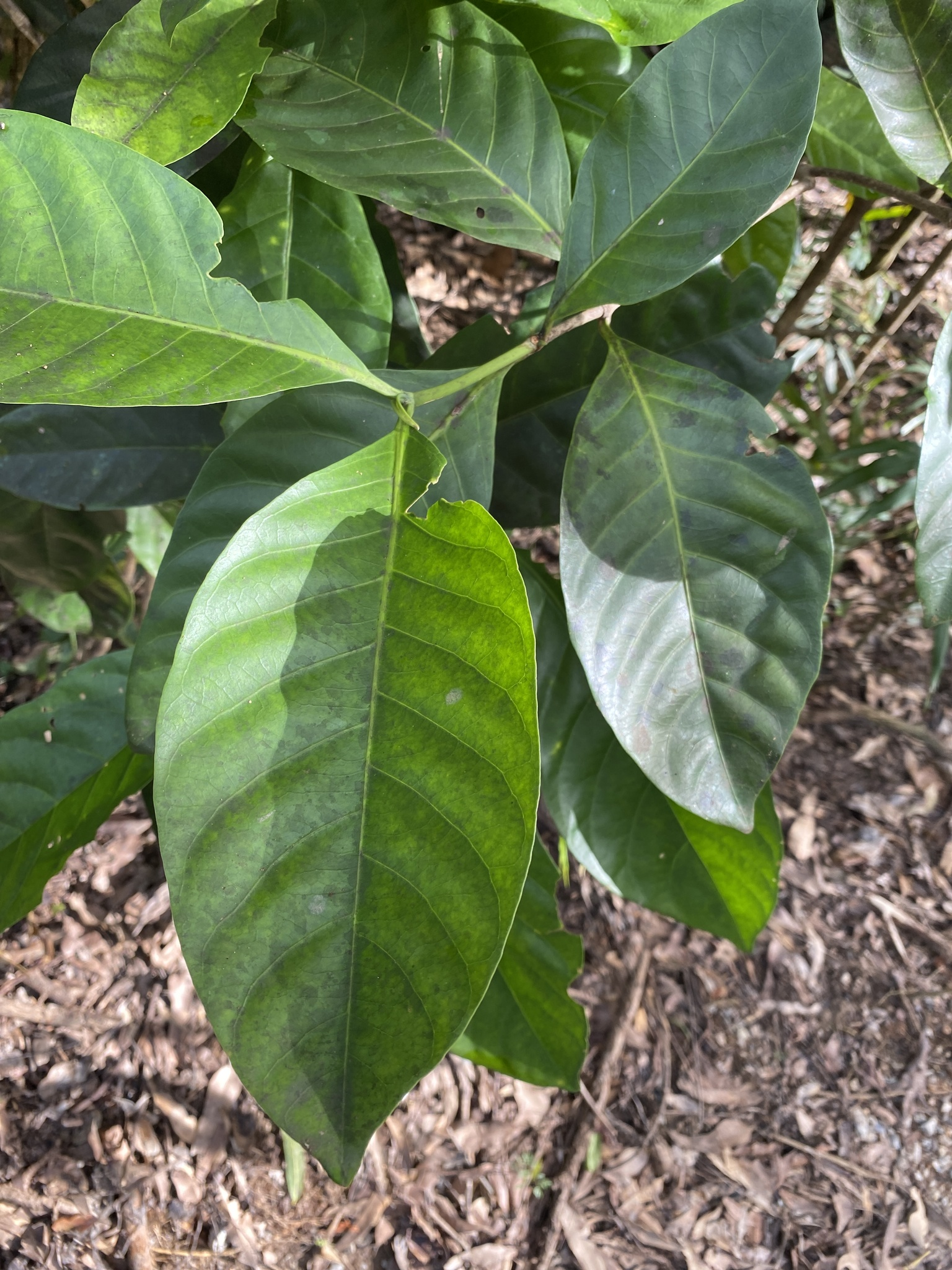
Foliage

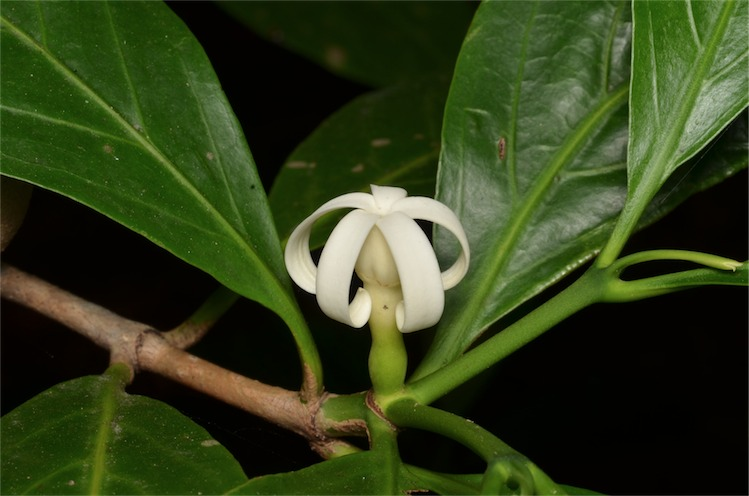
Flower

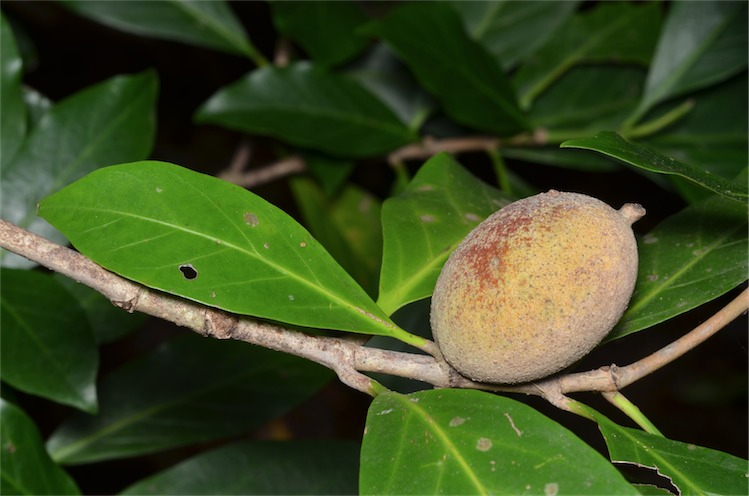
Fruit
