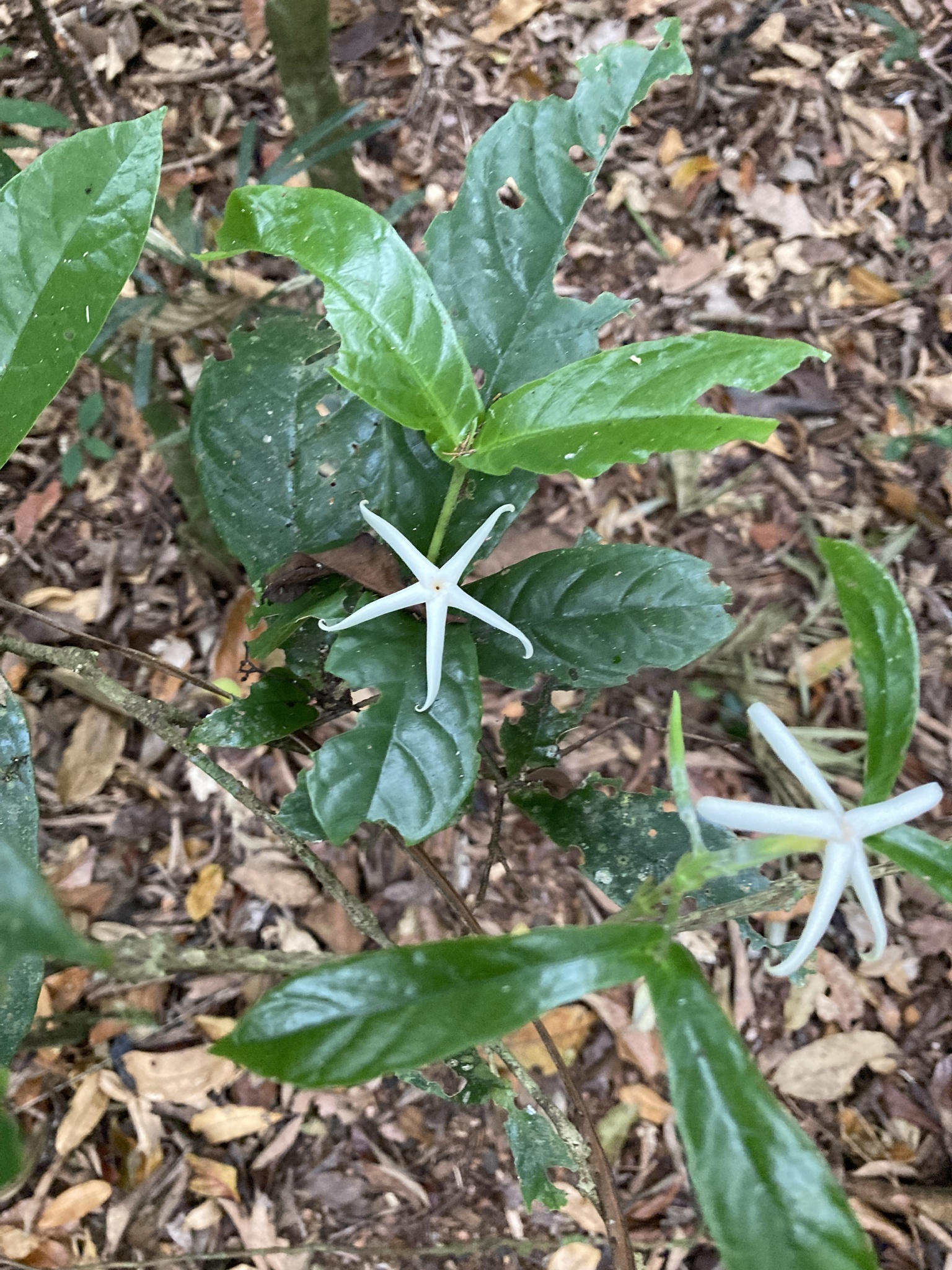
- Flowers

Conservation status
- Least Concern (IUCN 3.1)
- Least Concern (NCA)

Scientific classification
- Kingdom: Plantae
- Clade: Embryophytes
- Clade: Tracheophytes
- Clade: Angiosperms
- Clade: Eudicots
- Clade: Asterids
- Order: Gentianales
- Family: Rubiaceae
- Genus: Atractocarpus
- Species: A. merikin

Binomial name
- Atractocarpus merikin (F.M.Bailey) C.F.Puttock
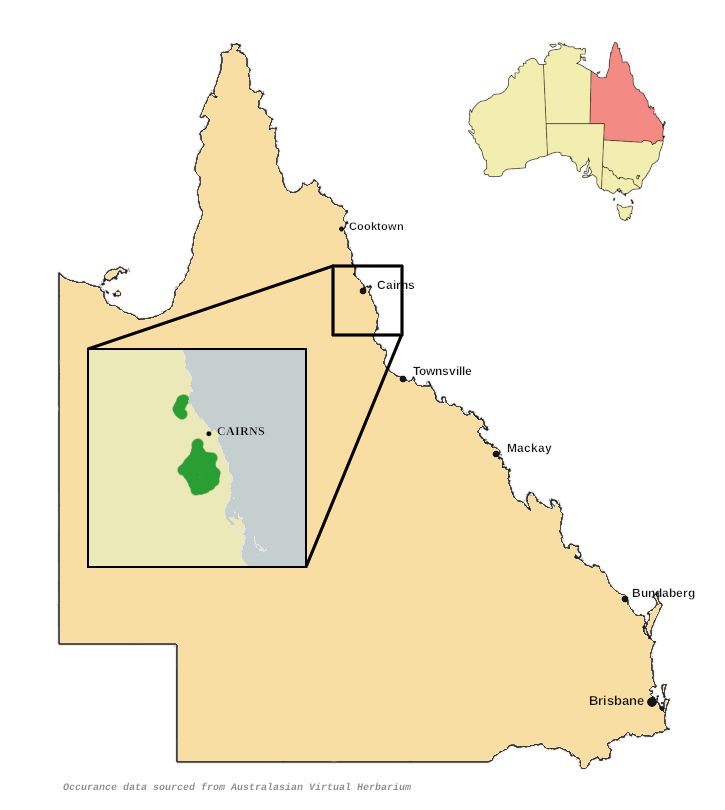

Synonyms
- Gardenia merriken F.M.Bailey

= Atractocarpus merikin =

Mountain gardenia

Species of flowering plant

Atractocarpus merikin, commonly known as the mountain gardenia or merikin, is a plant in the Rubiaceae family endemic to northeast Queensland, Australia.

== Description ==
Atractocarpus merikin is an evergreen shrub growing up to 3 m (9.8 ft) in height, occasionally 5 m (16 ft), with separate male and female plants. The dark green leaves are arranged in opposite pairs and may be up to 18 cm (7.1 in) long by 6 cm (2.4 in) wide. They are narrow at the base and broadest near the far end of the blade, and the base is auriclulate and sessile or almost sessile.

The inflorescences may consist of panicles, fascicles or solitary flowers, and are produced in the leaf axils. The white fragrant flowers have 5 petals and measure about 50 mm (2.0 in) diameter. The calyx lobes are about 1 mm (0.039 in) long, the corolla tube about 15–20 mm (0.59–0.79 in) long.

The fruit is an orange, pink or reddish drupe between 35 and 70 mm (1.4 and 2.8 in) long and 25 and 45 mm (0.98 and 1.77 in) wide, containing numerous brown patelliform (i.e. like a shallow dish) seeds.

=== Phenology ===
Flowering occurs from October to February, fruits ripen from July to February.

== Taxonomy ==
This species was first described in 1902 by the English born Australian botanist Frederick Manson Bailey in his book The Queensland Flora, in which he gave it the name Gardenia merikin. In 1999 the Australian botanist Christopher Francis Puttock transferred the taxon to the genus Atractocarpus, which is the current combination.

=== Etymology ===
The genus name Atractocarpus is created from the Ancient Greek words atractos (spindle) and karpos (fruit). It refers to the shape of the fruit of the type species, Atractocarpus bracteatus. The species epithet merikin is the local indigenous name for the plant.

== Distribution and habitat ==
Merikin grows in well developed rainforest from Mt Spurgeon (source of the Mossman River), to the Tully River, at altitudes from around 80 m (260 ft) to 1,300 m (4,300 ft).

== Conservation ==
This species is listed by the Queensland Department of Environment and Science as least concern. As of 13 October 2023, it has not been assessed by the IUCN.

== Gallery ==
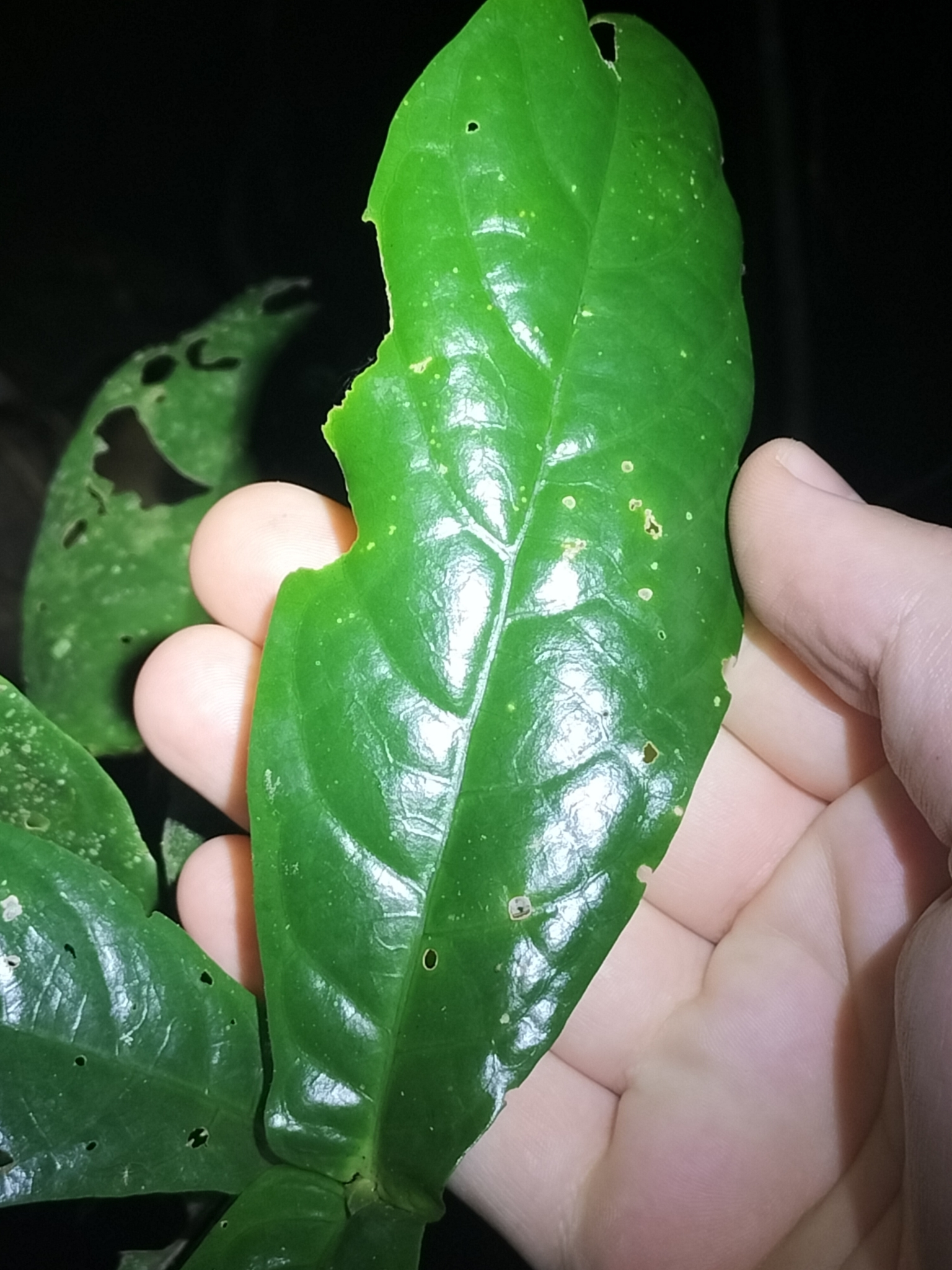
Leaf

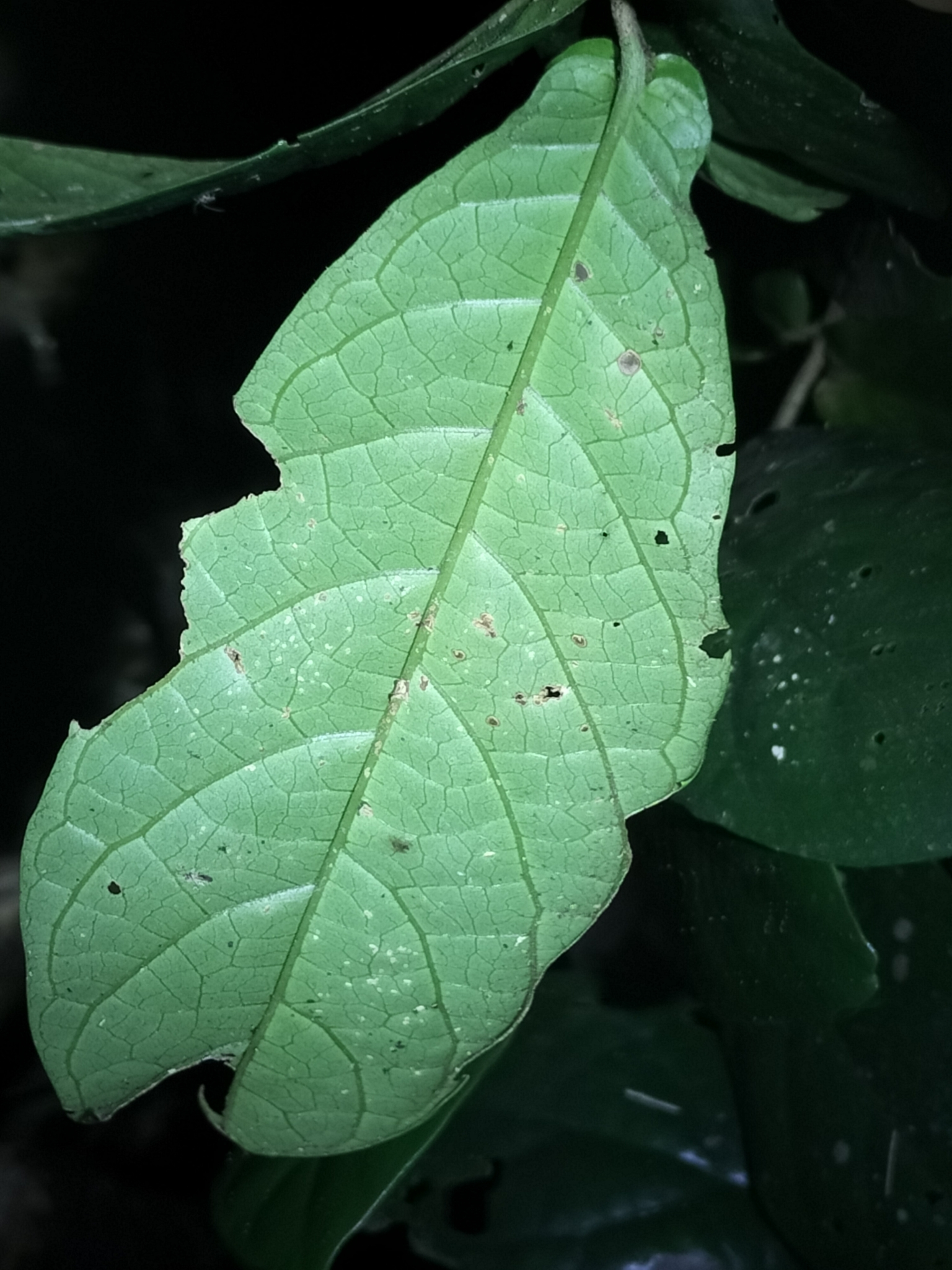
Leaf underside

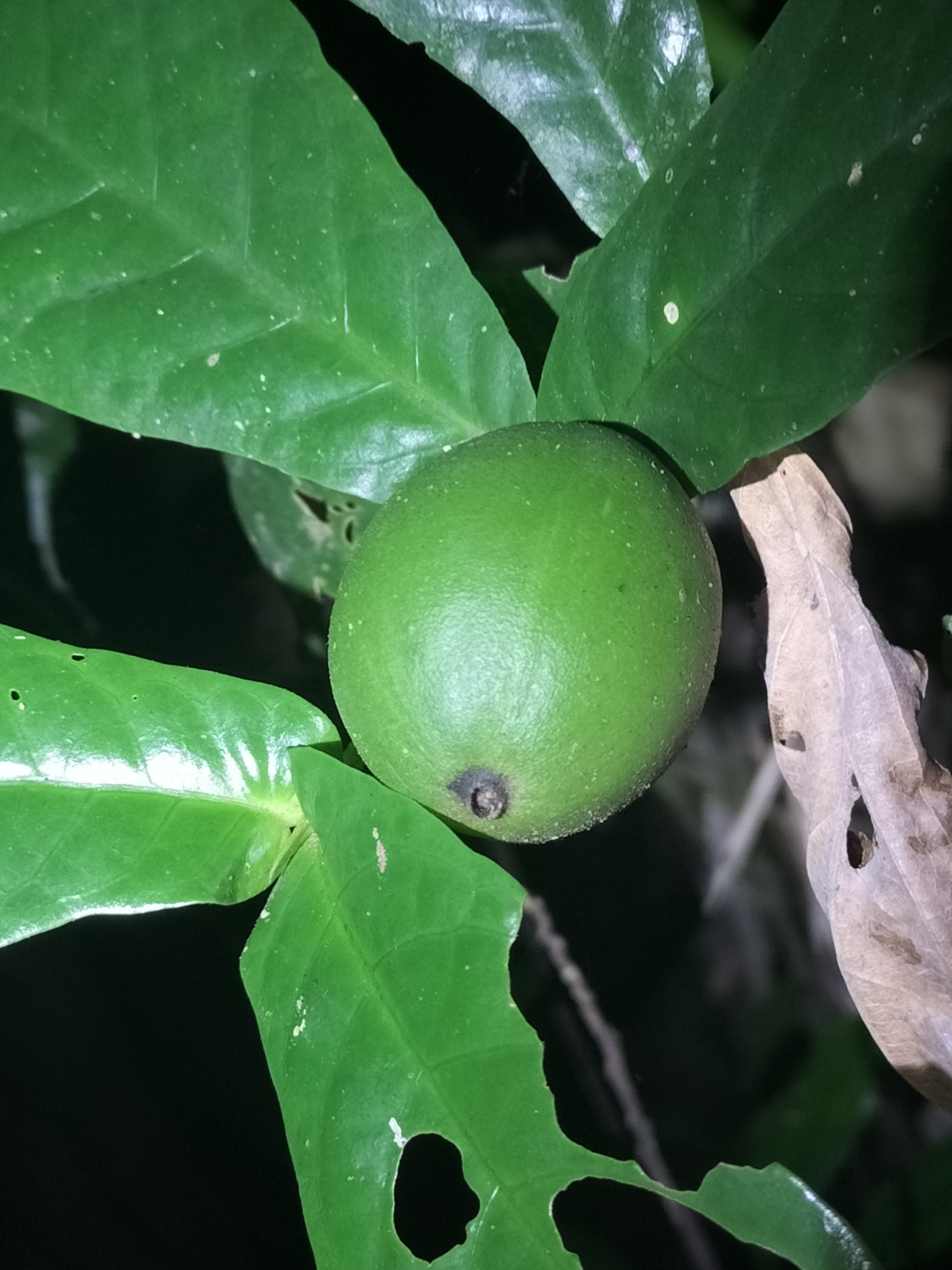
Fruit

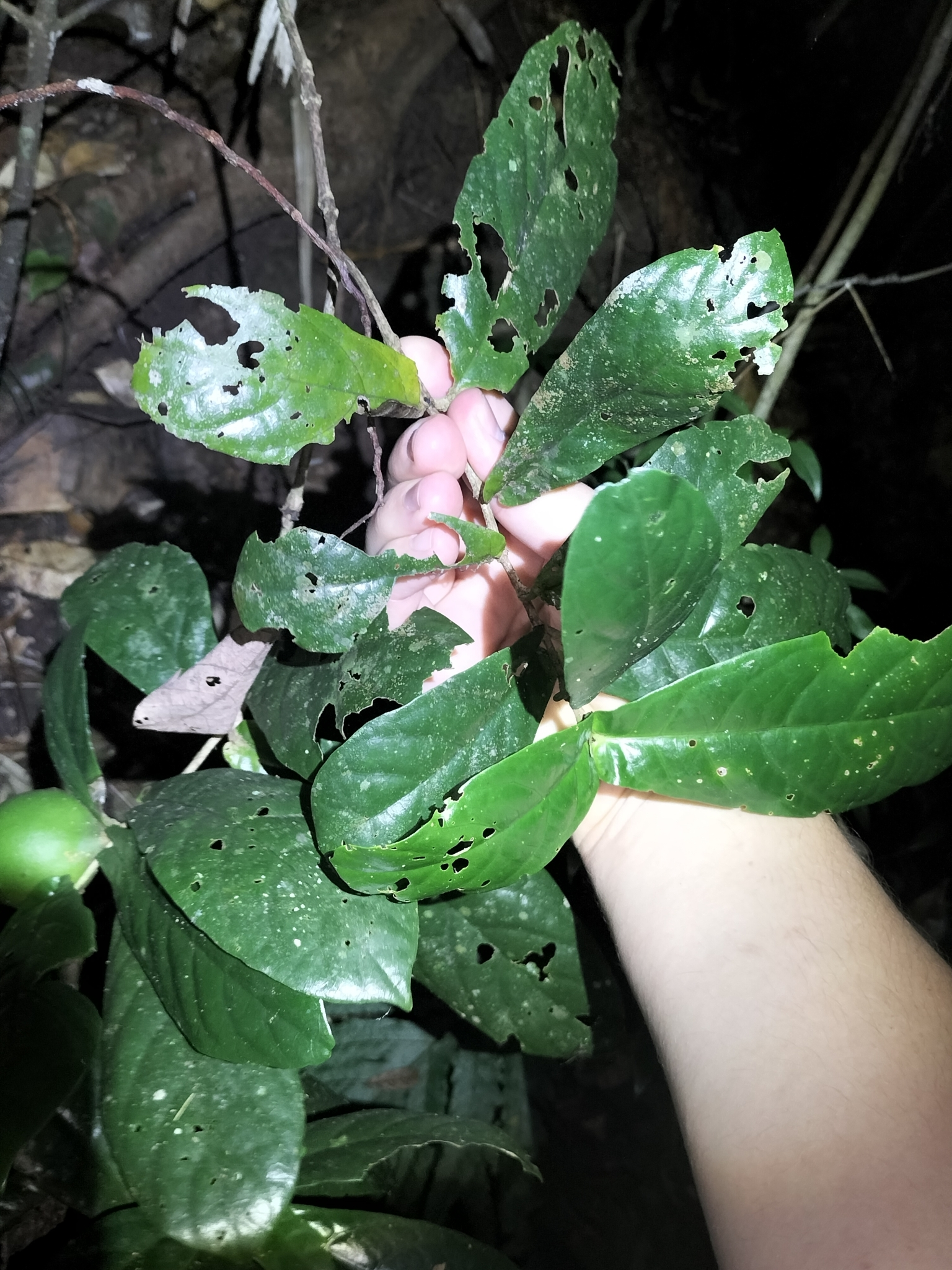
Foliage
