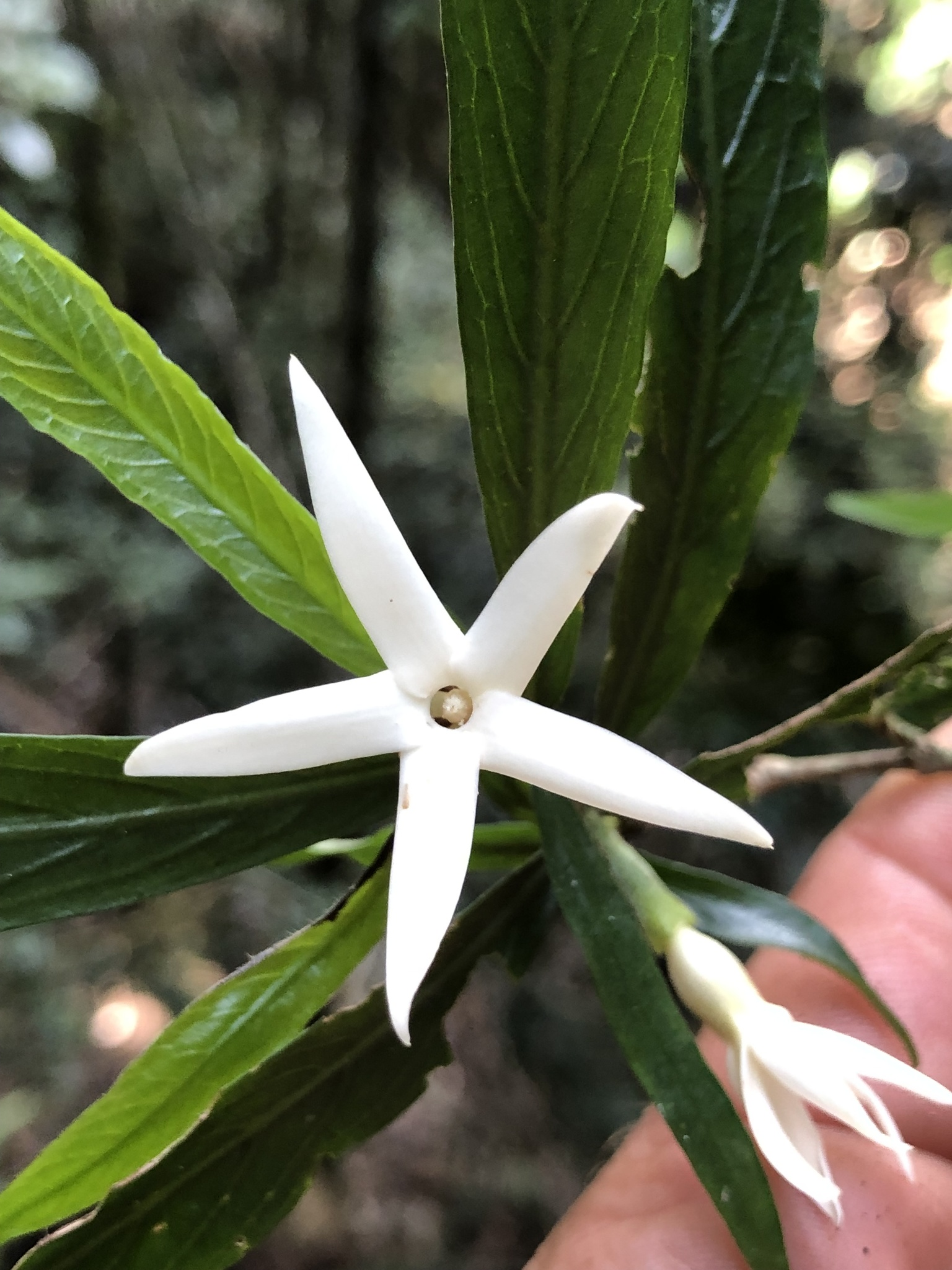

Conservation status
- Least Concern (IUCN 3.1)
- Least Concern (NCA)

Scientific classification
- Kingdom: Plantae
- Clade: Embryophytes
- Clade: Tracheophytes
- Clade: Angiosperms
- Clade: Eudicots
- Clade: Asterids
- Order: Gentianales
- Family: Rubiaceae
- Genus: Atractocarpus
- Species: A. chartaceus

Binomial name
- Atractocarpus chartaceus (F.Muell.) Puttock
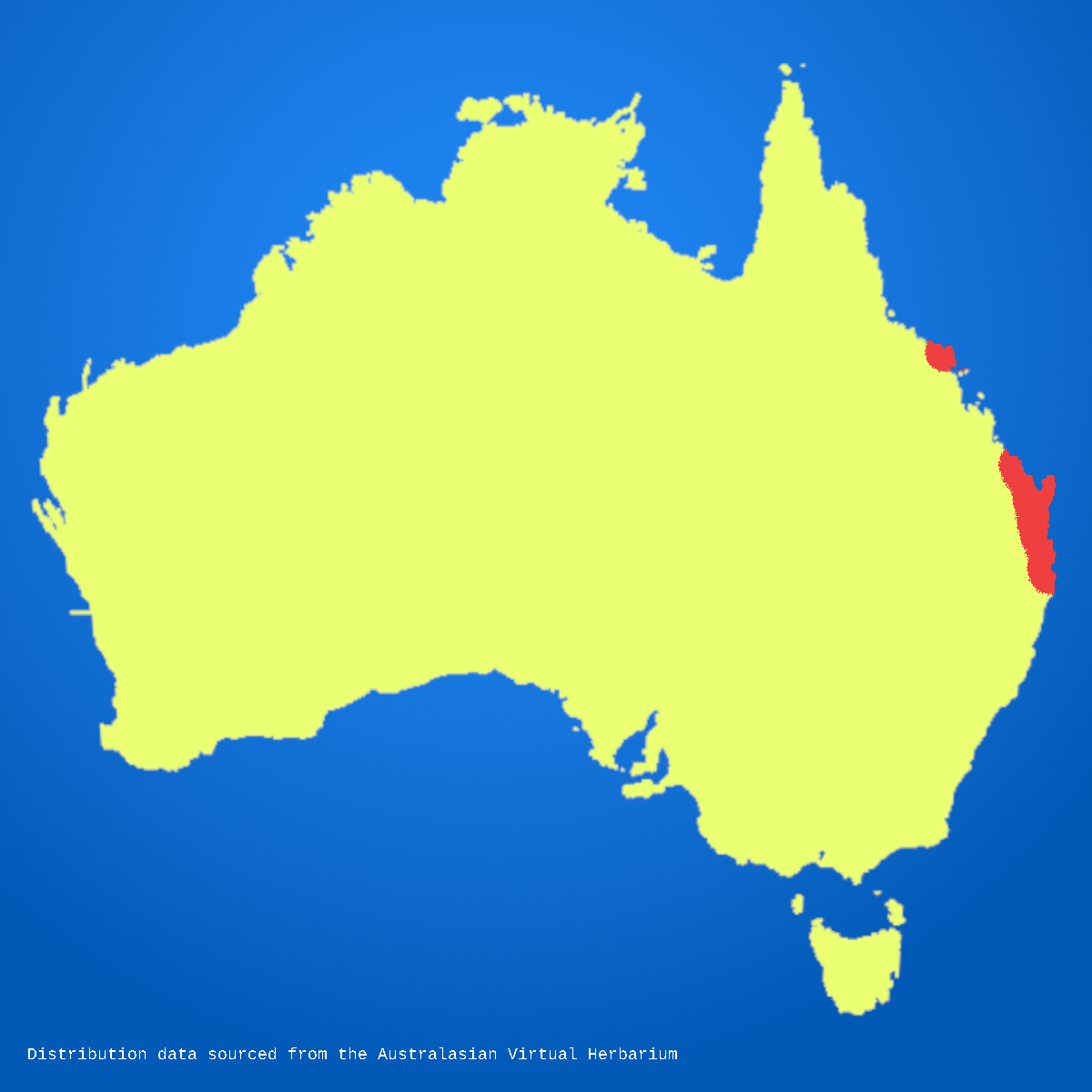

Synonyms
- Gardenia chartacea F.Muell.; Randia chartacea (F.Muell.) F.Muell.

= Atractocarpus chartaceus =

Narrow-leaved gardenia

Species of plant in the coffee family

Atractocarpus chartaceus, commonly known as the narrow-leaved gardenia, is a species of evergreen flowering plant in the coffee family Rubiaceae. It is found in subtropical rainforest of eastern Queensland, Australia, and it is cultivated for its fragrant flowers and colourful fruit.

== Description ==
Atractocarpus chartaceus is an understory shrub or small tree growing up to 6 m (20 ft) in height under ideal conditions, with a stem diameter up to 7.5 cm (3.0 in). The trunk is crooked and asymmetrical at the base. The bark is brownish grey, and relatively smooth with some wrinkles or horizontal cracks. The tips of the branchlets have fawn hairs.

The leaves are dark green and glabrous on the upper surface, and dull grey-green below. They may be opposite and decussate, or arranged in whorls or 3 or 4. The juvenile leaves are very long and narrow, measuring up to 25 by 1 cm (9.8 by 0.4 in), while the mature leaves are broadly oblanceolate, measuring up to 15.5 by 5 cm (6.1 by 2.0 in). They have 8-11 pairs of secondary veins (i.e. the veins that branch off from the midrib) which are quite prominent on both surfaces. The leaves are often marked by the trail of a leaf miner.

This species is dioecious, meaning that female and male flowers are borne on separate plants. The inflorescences are either terminal or axillary and include one, two or three flowers. The individual flowers are actinomorphic and either 5 or 6 merous (i.e. with 5 or 6 petals and sepals), and quite fragrant. Flowering occurs from August to October.

The fruits are a berry in botanical terms, measuring 15 to 30 mm (0.6 to 1 in) long and 7 to 18 mm (0.3 to 0.7 in) in diameter. They are orange or red, finely hairy and the remains of the calyx tube is attached at the distal end. Fruits contain a sweet edible pulp with several 4 to 5 mm (0.16 to 0.20 in) seeds embedded in it. They ripen from April to August.

== Taxonomy ==
The German naturalist and Victorian Government botanist, Ferdinand von Mueller, originally described this species in 1860 as Gardenia chartacea, publishing it in his work Essay on the plants collected by Mr Eugene Fitzalan during Lieut. Smith's Expedition to the Estuary of the Burdekin. In 1875 he revised the name in his monumental work Fragmenta phytographiae Australiae, transferring it to a new genus with the combination Randia chartacea. More than one hundred years later, in 1999, it was revised by botanists Christopher Francis Puttock and Christopher John Quinn, who placed the species in its current genus Atractocarpus.

=== Etymology ===
The genus name Atractocarpus is created from the Ancient Greek atractos (spindle) and karpos (fruit). It refers to the shape of the fruit of the type species, Atractocarpus bracteatus. The species epithet chartaceus is derived from the Latin word charta (paper), which is a reference to the thin papery leaves.

== Distribution and habitat ==
The natural range of the narrow-leaved gardenia is coastal subtropical forests of eastern Australia, from the Richmond River, New South Wales, (about 29°S) to Gladstone, Queensland (about 23°S). There is also a small, very disjunct population in Eungella National Park west of Mackay (about 21°S), some 370 km (230 mi) to the north. Puttock surmises that the disjunction is a result of a lack of observations/collections, rather than the plant being absent from the area.

It is usually found on basaltic and alluvial soils where the annual rainfall is between 1,300 and 1,600 mm (51 and 63 in).

== Ecology ==
Atractocarpus chartaceus has been identified as a host plant for the leaf mining larvae of the genus Gracillariidae.

== Conservation ==
This species is listed by both the IUCN and the Queensland Department of Environment and Science as least concern.

== Cultivation ==
Atractocarpus chartaceus has been in cultivation in Australia for some years. It is an attractive garden ornamental with its glossy foliage, scented flowers and colourful fruit, and the flowers attract numerous birds and insects to the garden. It prefers a shady position and good drainage.. It can be propagated from fresh seed, which may take a few months but is usually successful, or from cuttings of the current season's growth.

== Gallery ==
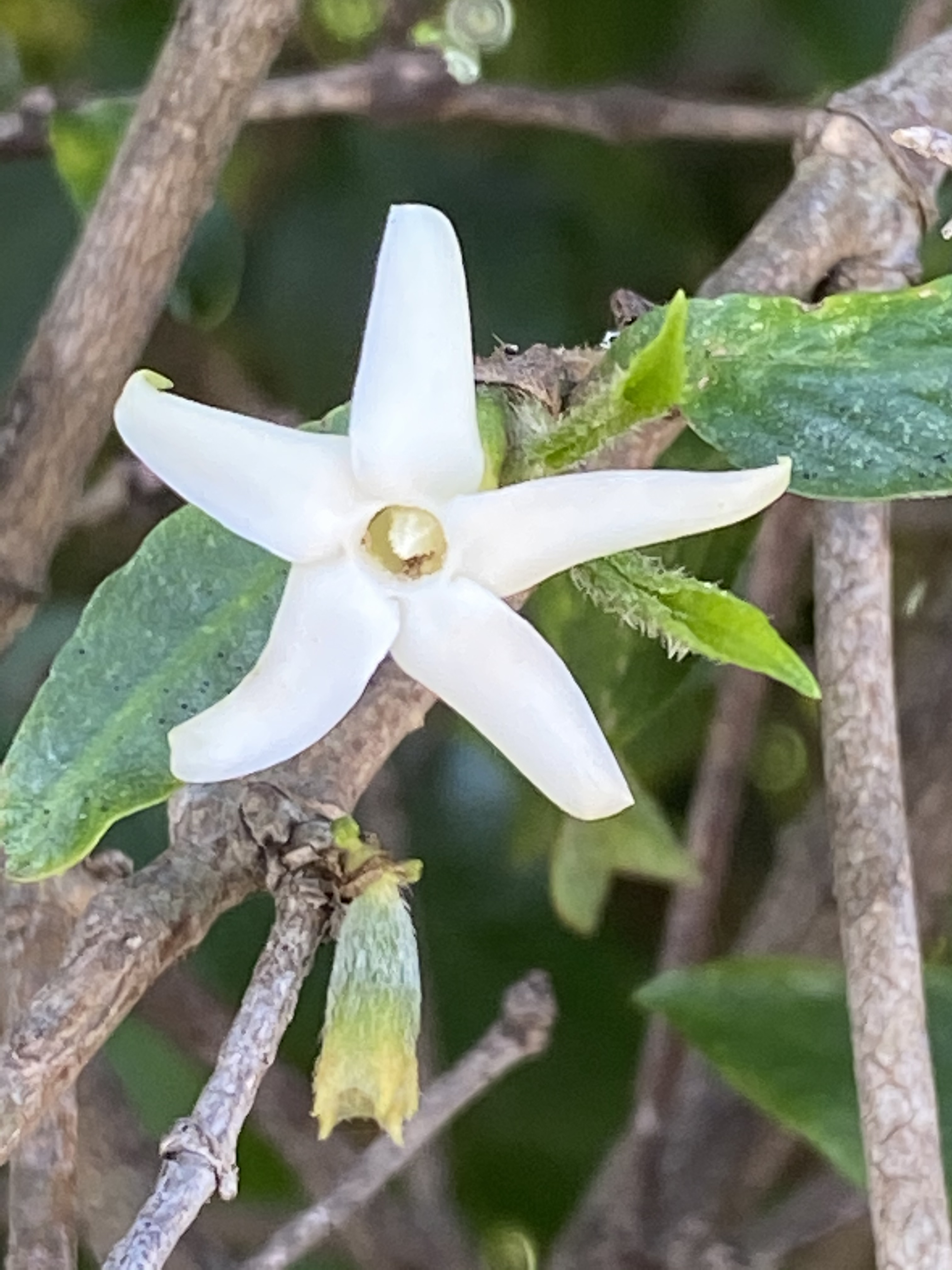
Growing in Wollongong Botanic Gardens

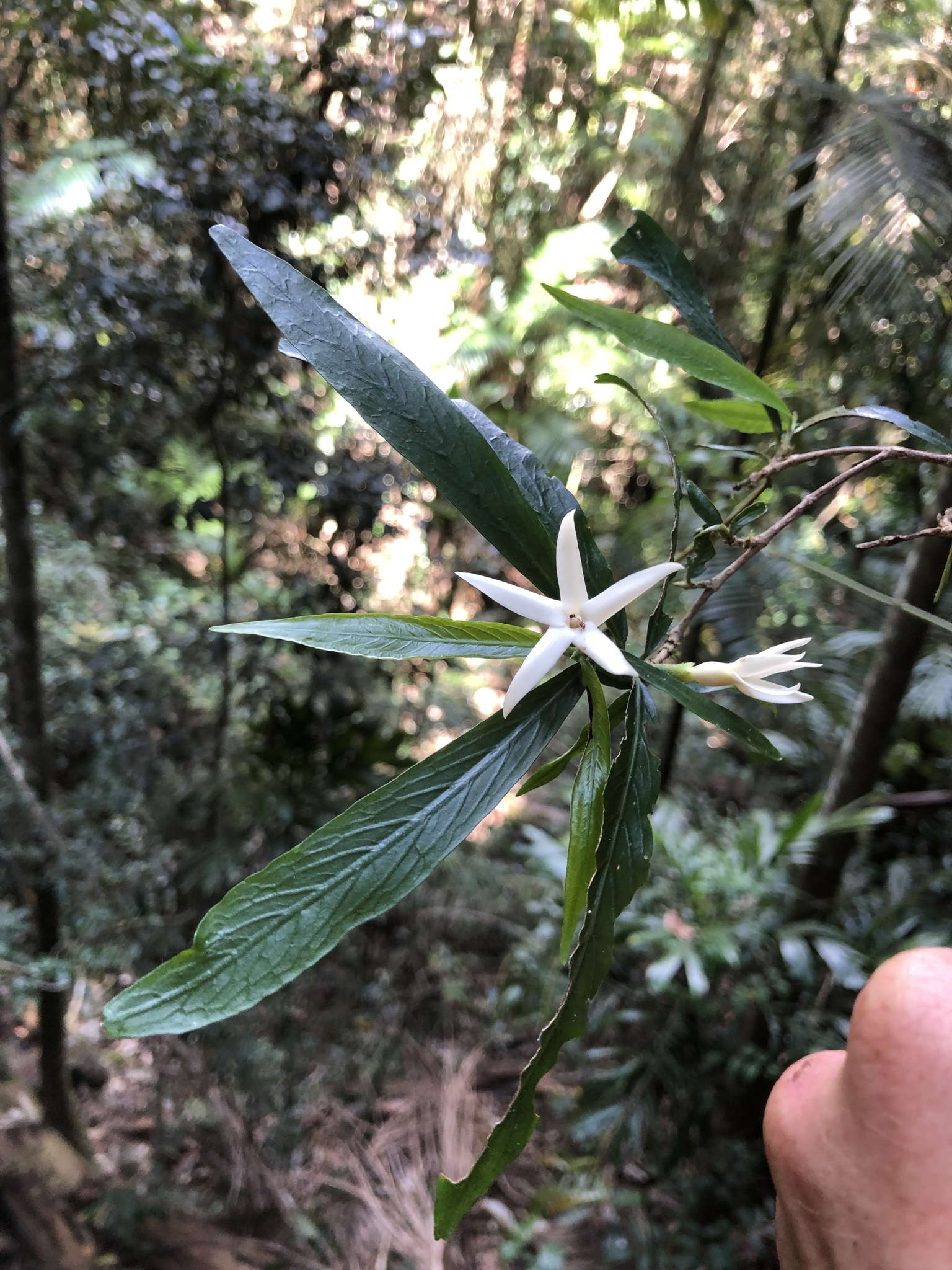
Flowers and leaves, northern NSW

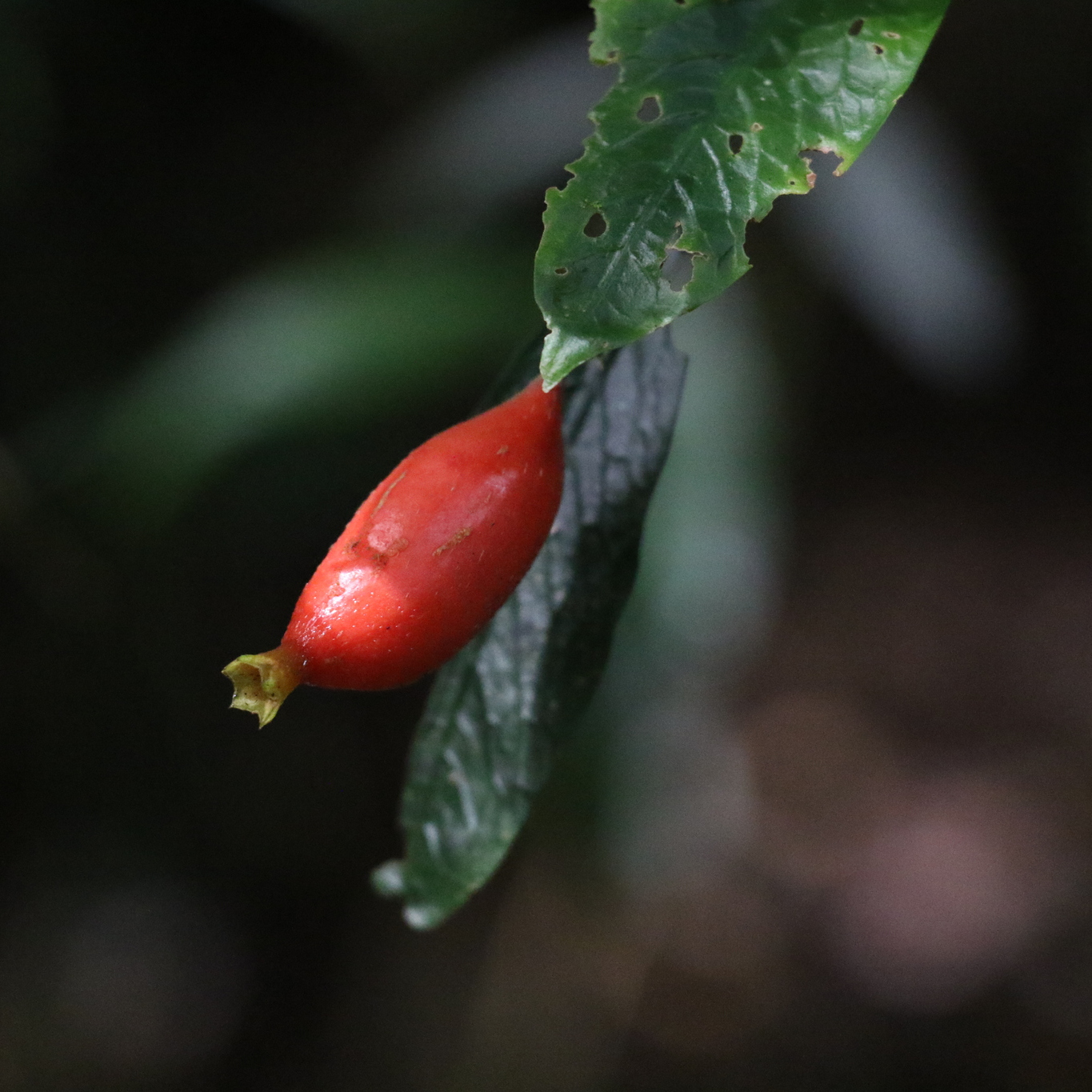
Fruit at Natural Bridge, Queensland

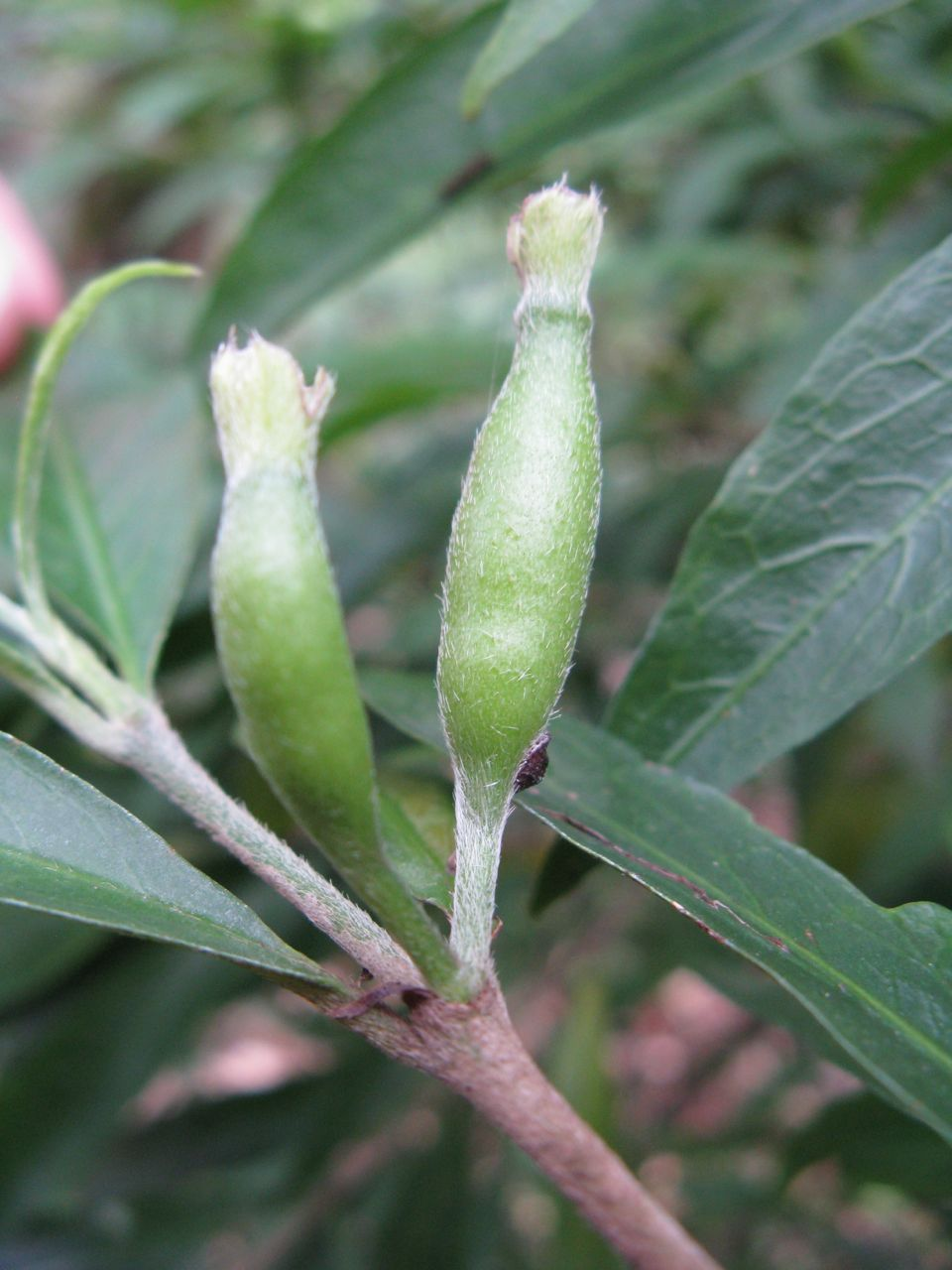
Developing fruit, Australian National Botanic Gardens, Canberra

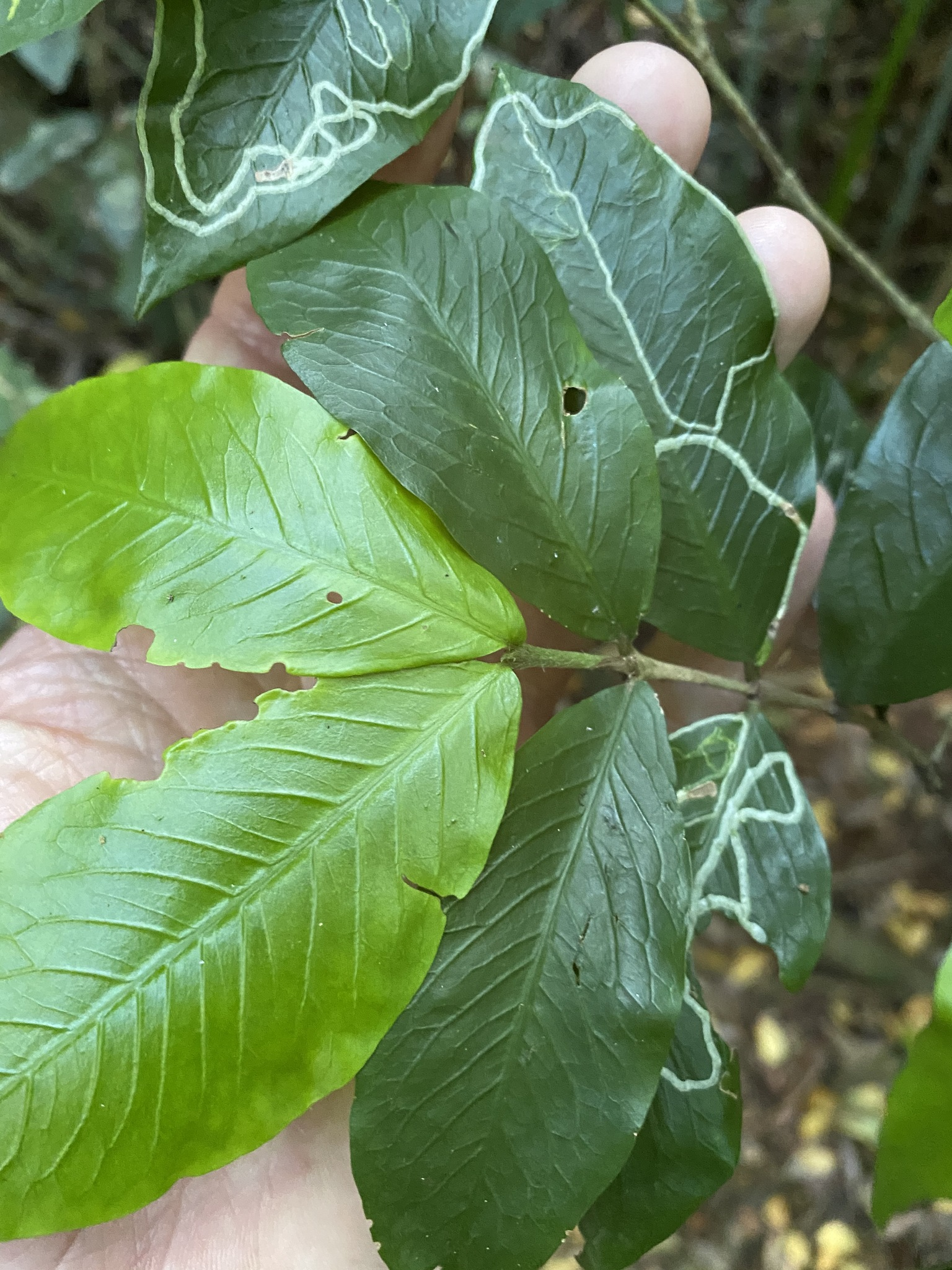
Leaf-miner damage

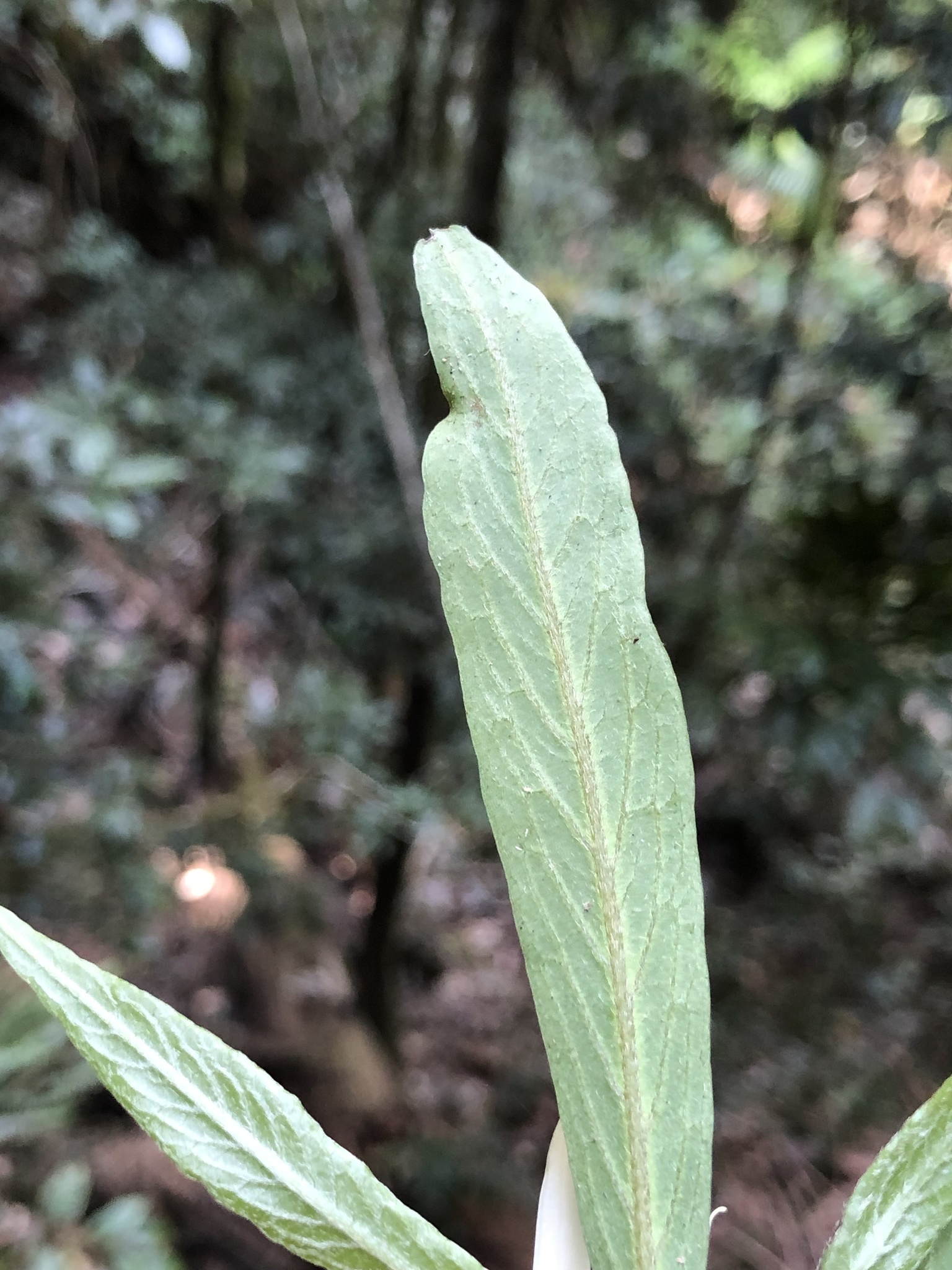
Underside of leaf

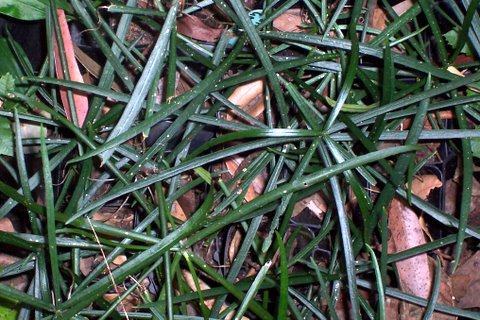
Juvenile foliage
