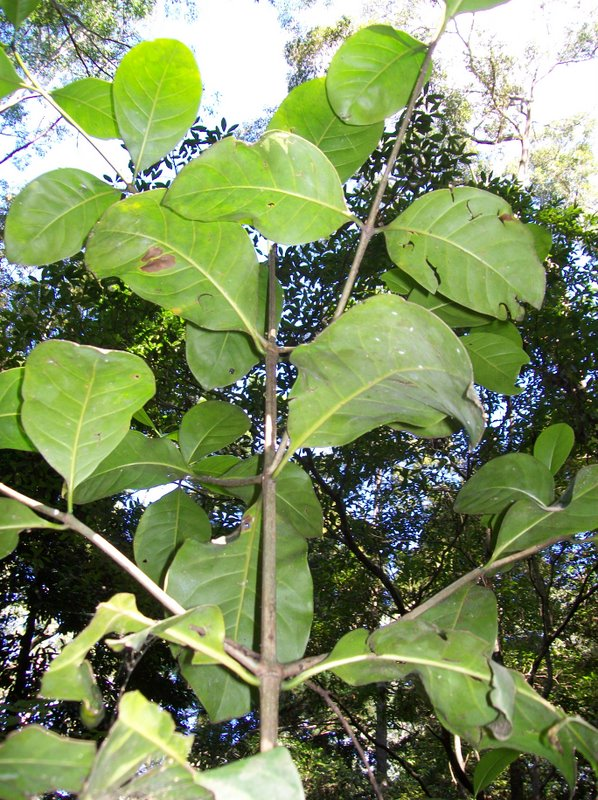

Conservation status
- Least Concern (IUCN 3.1)

Scientific classification
- Kingdom: Plantae
- Clade: Embryophytes
- Clade: Tracheophytes
- Clade: Angiosperms
- Clade: Eudicots
- Clade: Asterids
- Order: Gentianales
- Family: Rubiaceae
- Genus: Atractocarpus
- Species: A. benthamianus

Binomial name
- Atractocarpus benthamianus (F.Muell.) Puttock

Synonyms
- Gardenia benthamiana F.Muell.; Randia benthamiana F.Muell.

= Atractocarpus benthamianus =

Species of plant

Atractocarpus benthamianus is a species of flowering plant in the family Rubiaceae growing in eastern Australia, commonly known as native gardenia. It is an understorey species of subtropical and tropical rainforest on fertile soils. The natural range of distribution is from Forster, New South Wales (32° S) to central Queensland. This plant features beautifully scented flowers.

== Description ==
It grows as a woody shrub or small tree and reaches 8 m (25 ft) tall. The trunk does not form buttresses but may be crooked, and is covered by smooth grey bark with horizontal markings and long lenticels. The new growth is hairy in plants found north of Coffs Harbour (30° S) . The large glossy dark green leaves are obovate to lanceolate and range from 8–20 cm (3–8 in) long by 2–4 cm wide, and arranged in whorls of 3–4 on the branches. The veins and midrib are prominent on the leaf. The small white fragrant flowers appear from June to November, occur in clusters of two or three and have five lanceolate petals around a tube. The orange oval-shaped fruit ripens in May to September, and bears 14-18 seeds in a pulp. The fragrance of the flowers has been likened to that of the common gardenia.

== Distribution and habitat ==
The range is from Forster (32° S) on the New South Wales mid-north coast north through to Nambour (26° S) in Queensland. It is found in warm temperate to subtropical rainforests in areas of wetter climate.

== Uses ==
Its bushy lush foliage, fragrant flowers and colourful fruit give it horticultural potential in gardens in warm temperate and subtropical climates. It is suited to a shady position in gardens, or moderately to brightly lit indoor spaces.

== Taxonomy ==
Atractocarpus benthamianus was originally described by German naturalist and Victorian State Botanist Ferdinand von Mueller, who named it in honour of the botanist George Bentham, who wrote Flora Australiensis in 1870. It is commonly known as native gardenia.

Known for many years as Randia benthamiana, it gained its current binomial name in 1999 with the publishing of a genus revision by botanists Christopher Francis Puttock and Christopher Quinn.
