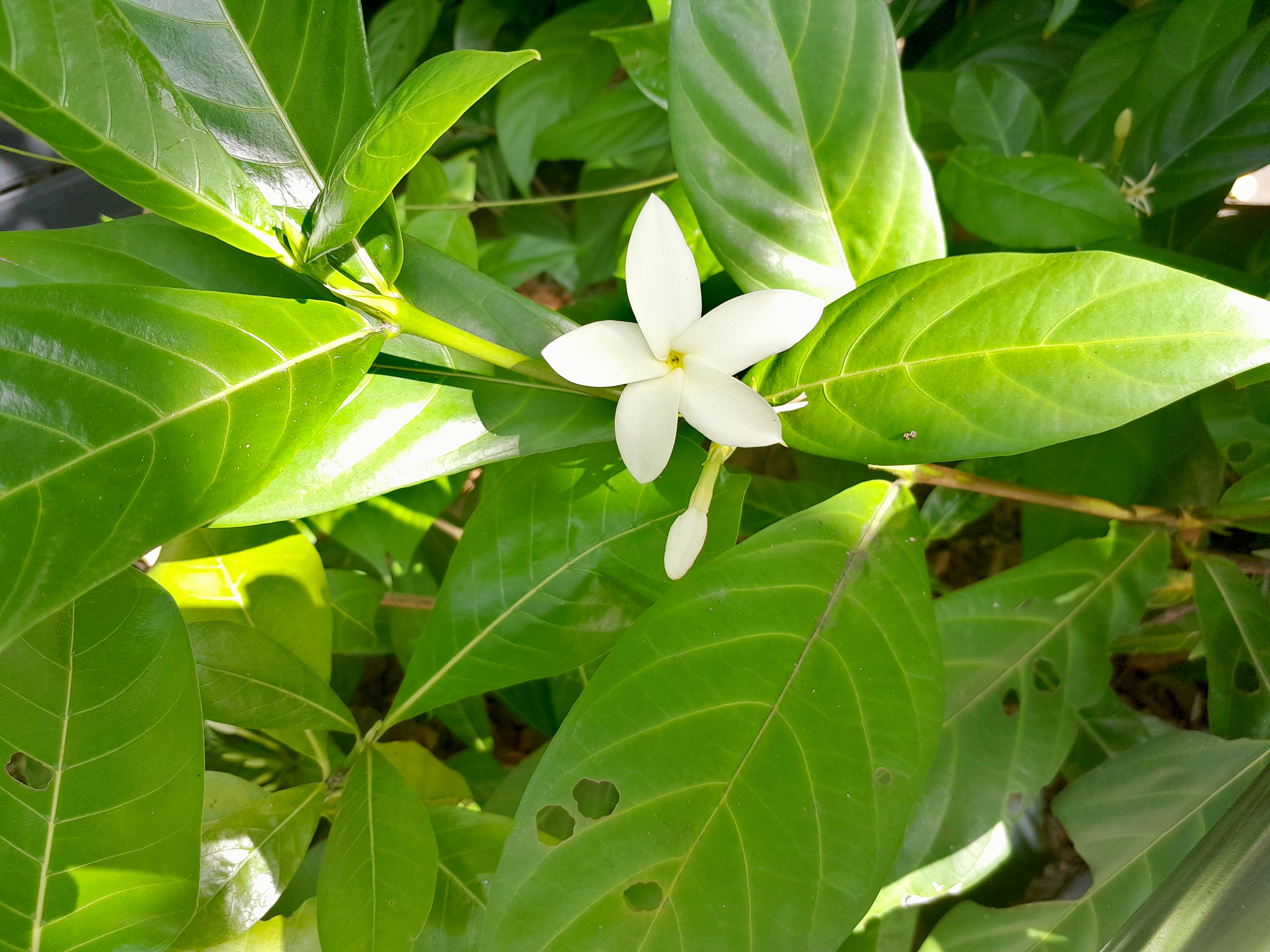
- Cultivated in Cairns Botanic Gardens

Conservation status
- Least Concern (IUCN 3.1)

Scientific classification
- Kingdom: Plantae
- Clade: Embryophytes
- Clade: Tracheophytes
- Clade: Angiosperms
- Clade: Eudicots
- Clade: Asterids
- Order: Gentianales
- Family: Rubiaceae
- Genus: Atractocarpus
- Species: A. decorus

Binomial name
- Atractocarpus decorus (Valeton) Puttock
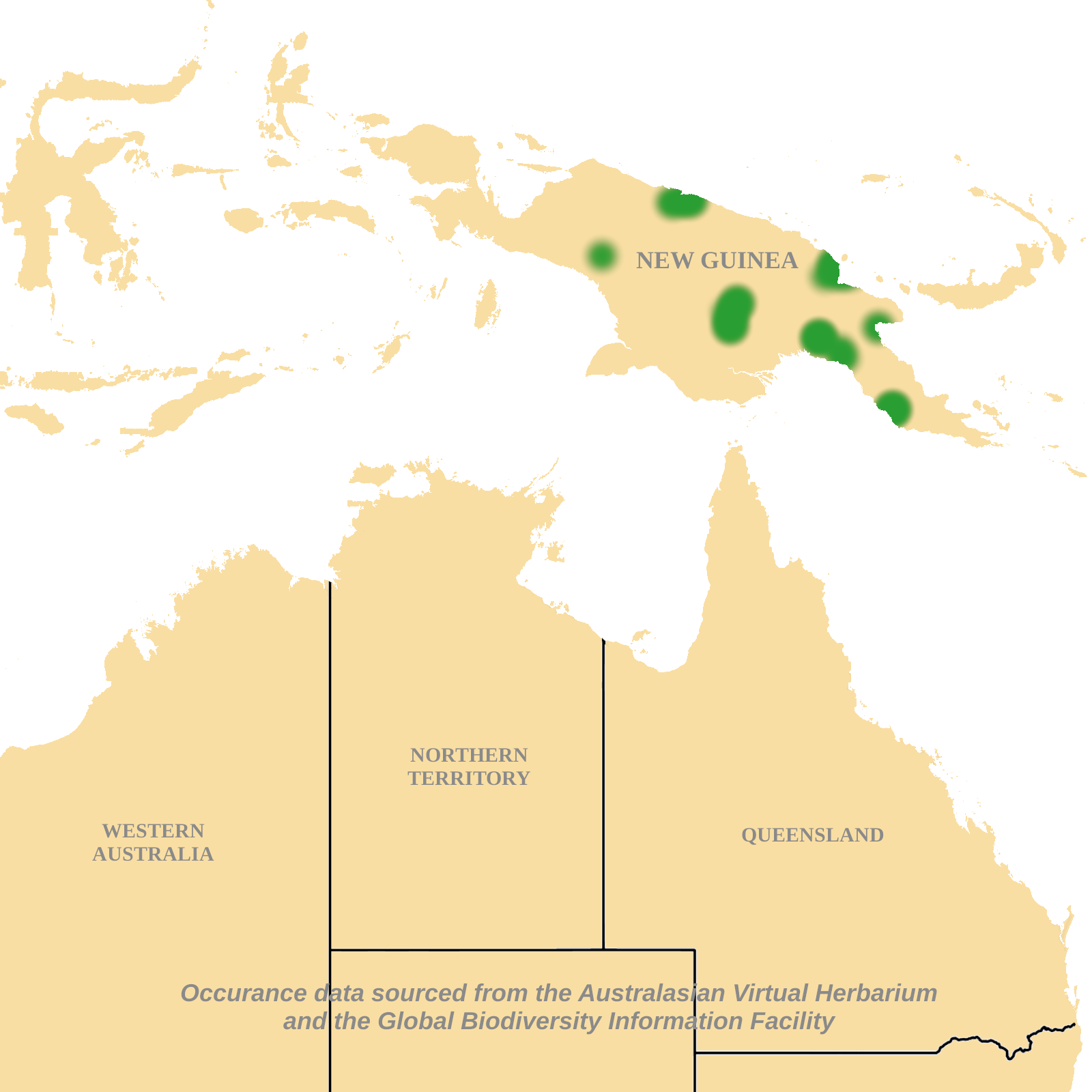

Synonyms
- Randia decora Valeton

= Atractocarpus decorus =

Species of flowering plant

Atractocarpus decorus is a plant in the coffee family Rubiaceae which is endemic to New Guinea. Like many others in the genus, it has glossy dark green leaves and attractive white flowers.

== Description ==
Atractocarpus decorus is a large shrub or small tree growing up to 4 m (13 ft) high. It has large leaves arranged in opposite pairs on the twigs, measuring up to 32 cm (13 in) long by up to 13 cm (5.1 in) wide. They are glossy dark green above and lighter below with 9 to 13 prominent lateral veins each side of the midrib. The female inflorescence consists of a single flower whereas the male inflorescence has between 15 and 30 flowers. Flowers are white with 5 petals, about 5 cm (2.0 in) long and 8 cm (3.1 in) across; the orange fruit is a solitary drupe about 4 cm (1.6 in) long and 3 cm (1.2 in) diameter.

== Taxonomy ==
The species was first described in 1925 as Randia decora by Theodoric Valeton, based on material collected across New Guinea by the German botanist Rudolf Schlechter and Swiss botanist Carl Ludwig Ledermann between 1901 and 1912. In a major review of the genus Atractocarpus in 1999 by Christopher Puttock, this species was transferred to Atractocarpus.

=== Etymology ===
The genus name Atractocarpus is derived from the Ancient Greek terms átraktos, meaning "spindle", and karpós meaning "fruit", and refers to the spindle-shaped fruit of the type species. The species epithet decorus is a Latin word meaning "elegant" or "beautiful".

== Distribution and habitat ==
This species is endemic to New Guinea, and grows in numerous locations on the island at altitudes from near sea level to at least 800 m (2,600 ft).

== Conservation ==
This species was assessed by the International Union for Conservation of Nature (IUCN) in 2018 and given the status of least concern. In its justification statement, the IUCN states "It is a widespread common species with an extent of occurrence exceeding the boundaries for a threatened category under criterion B. No major threats to the species have been identified and population is currently stable".

== Gallery ==
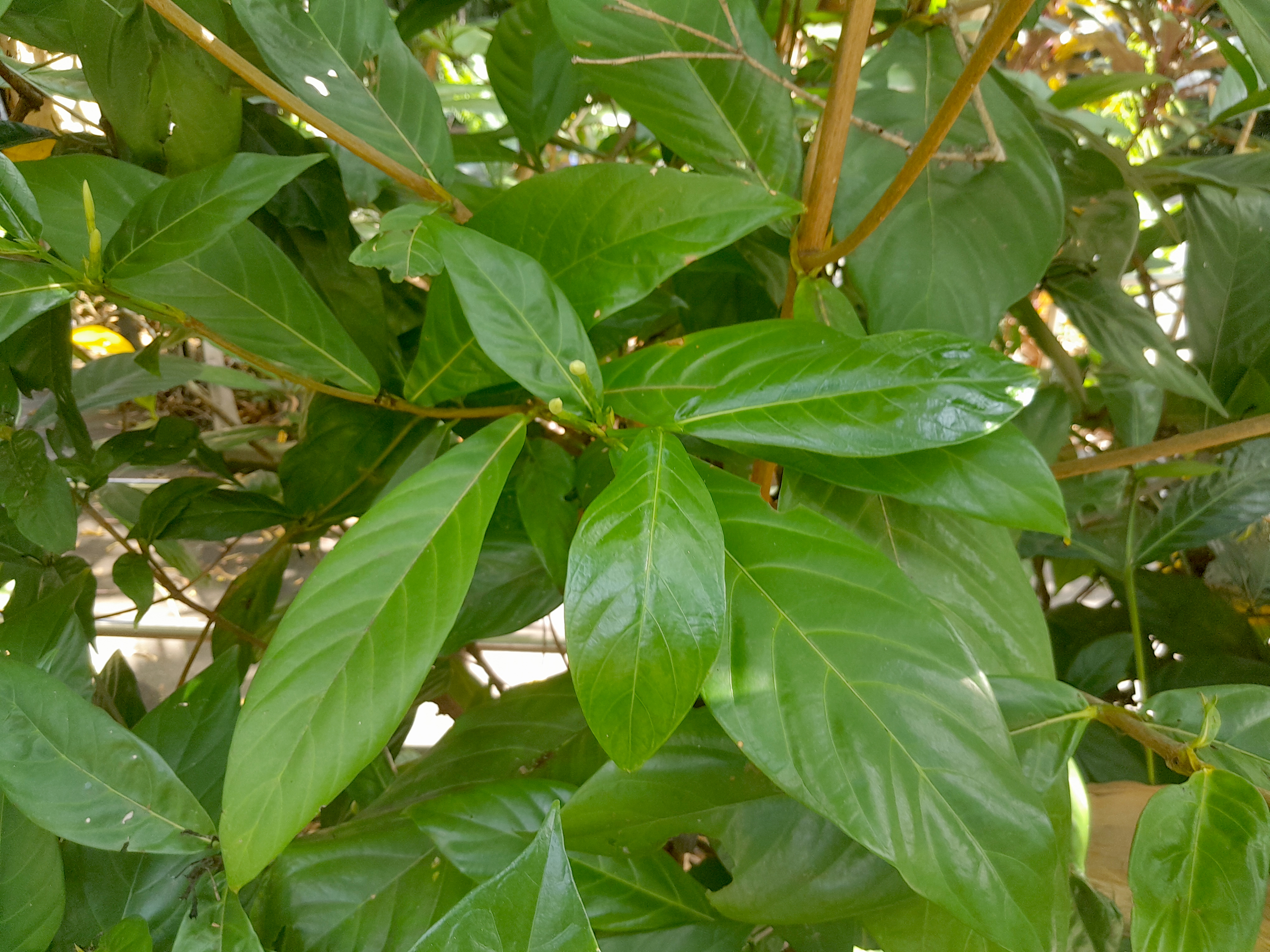
Foliage

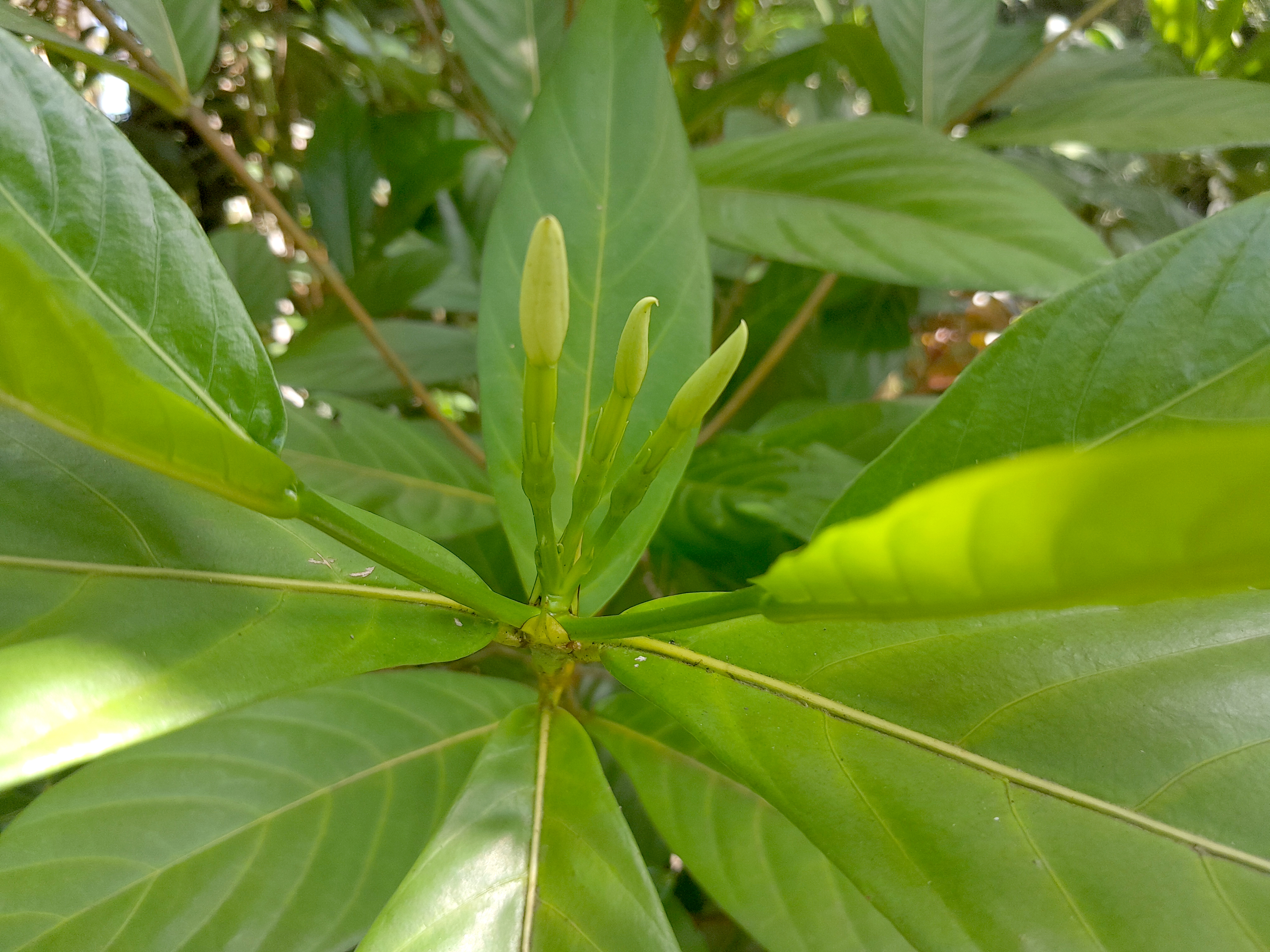
Flower buds

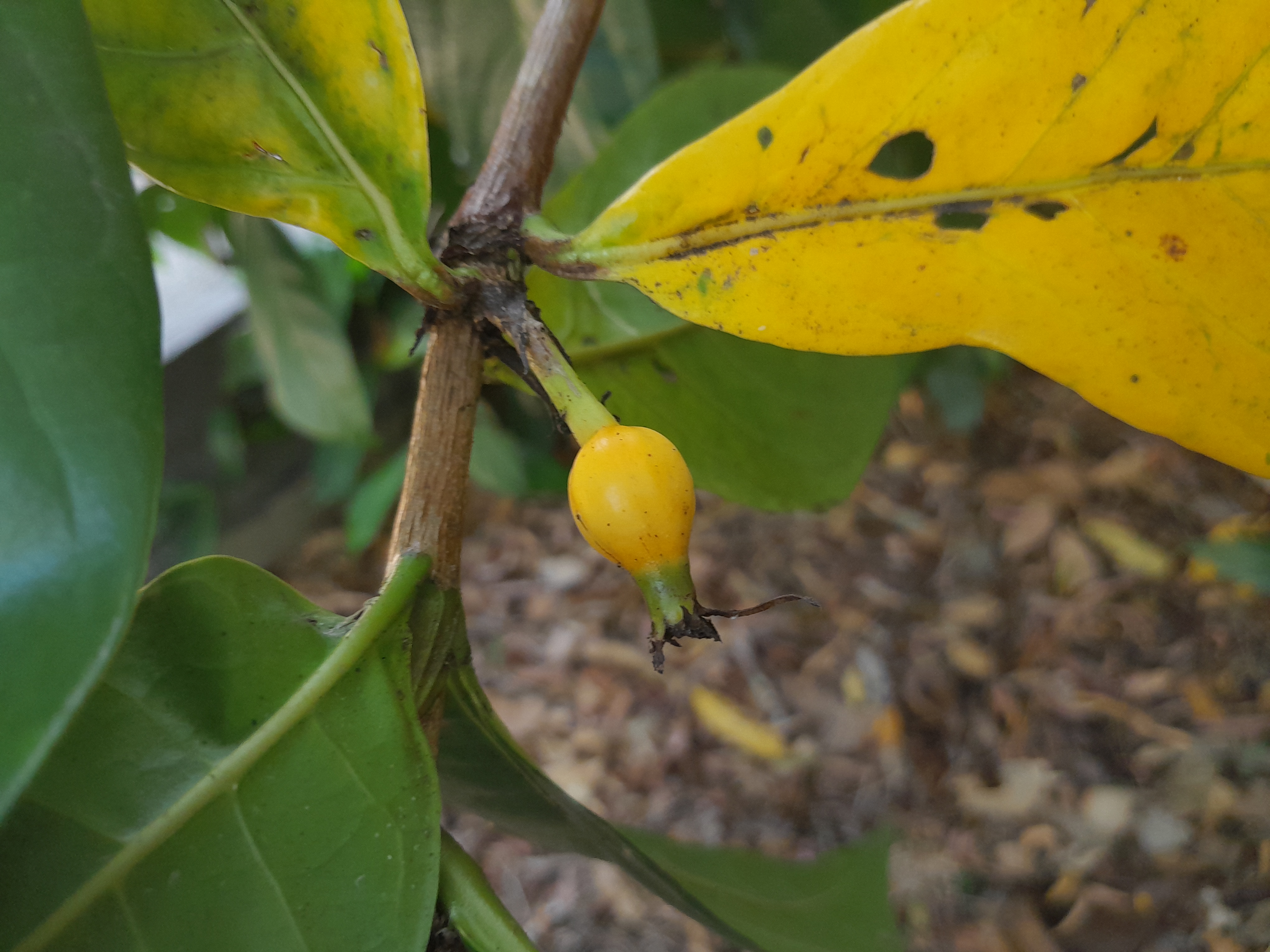
Fruit

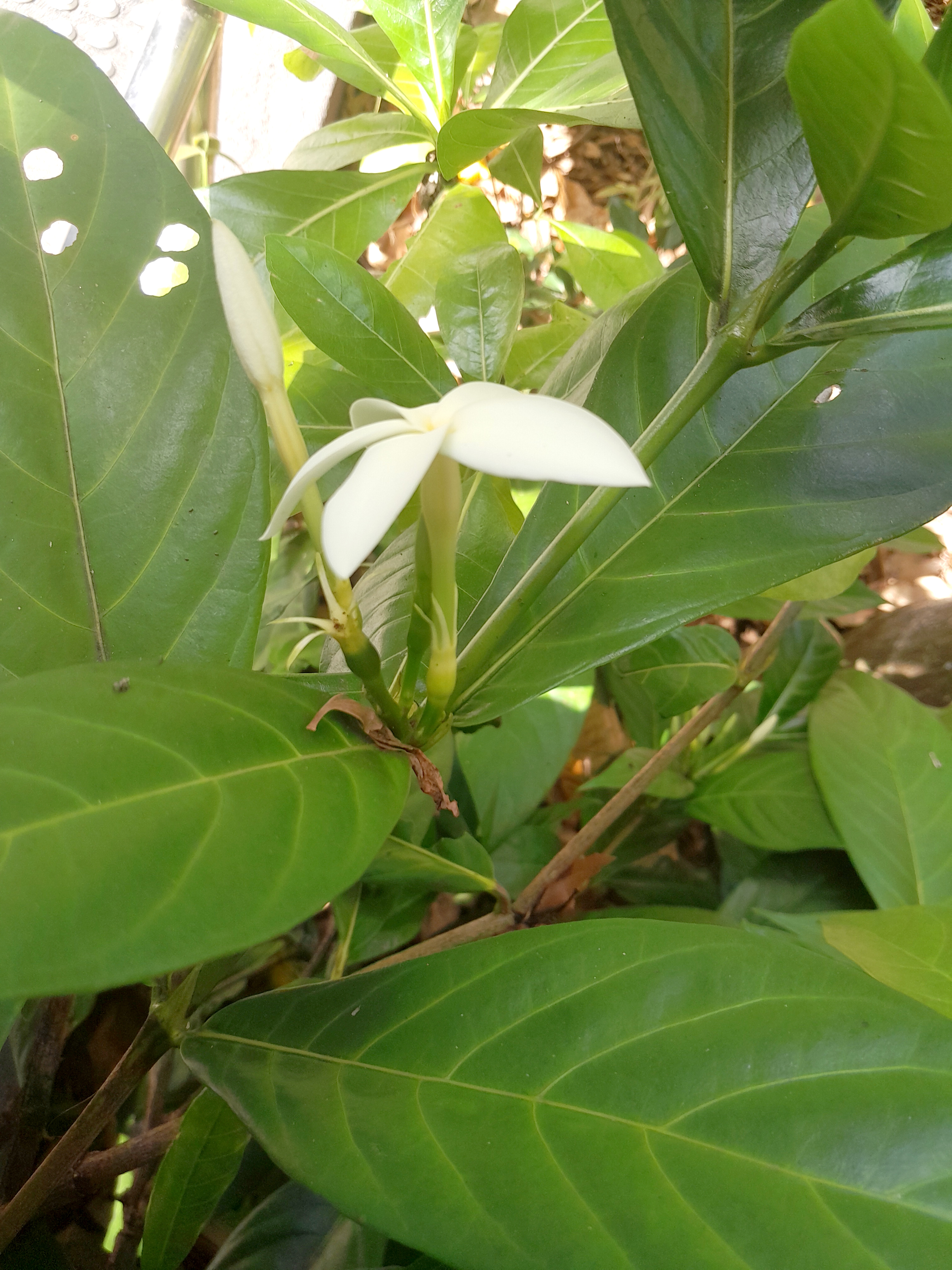
Flowers with calyx visible
