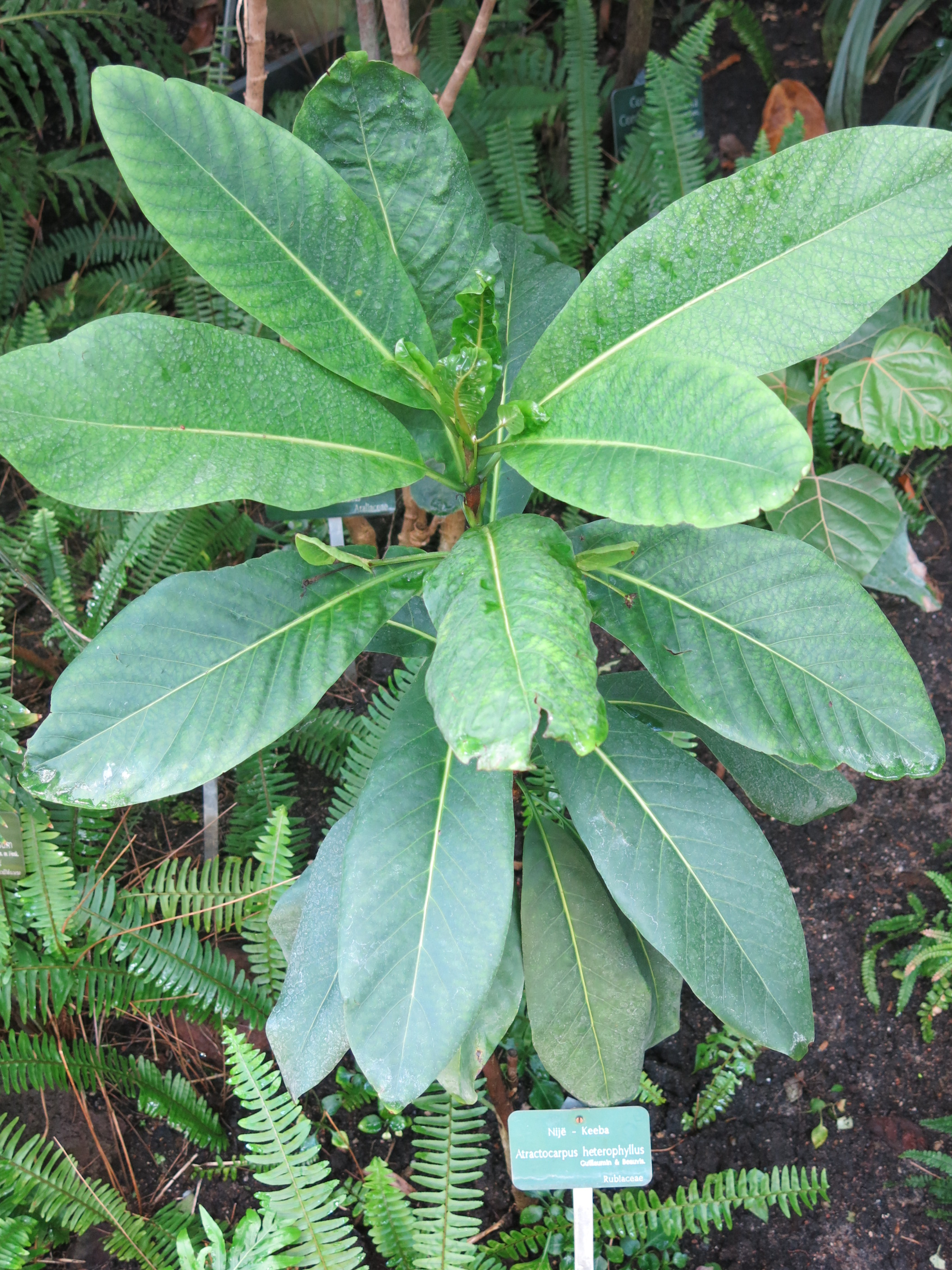
- In the Jardin des Plantes de Paris

Scientific classification
- Kingdom: Plantae
- Clade: Tracheophytes
- Clade: Angiosperms
- Clade: Eudicots
- Clade: Asterids
- Order: Gentianales
- Family: Rubiaceae
- Genus: Atractocarpus
- Species: A. heterophyllus

Binomial name
- Atractocarpus heterophyllus (Montrouz.) Guillaumin & Beauvis.

Synonyms
- Atractocarpus balansaeanus Guillaumin; Gardenia heterophylla Montrouz.; Gardenia fusiformis Baill. ex Heckel

= Atractocarpus heterophyllus =

Species of plant

Atractocarpus heterophyllus is a species of flowering plant in the family Rubiaceae. The plant is native to southeastern New Caledonia.
