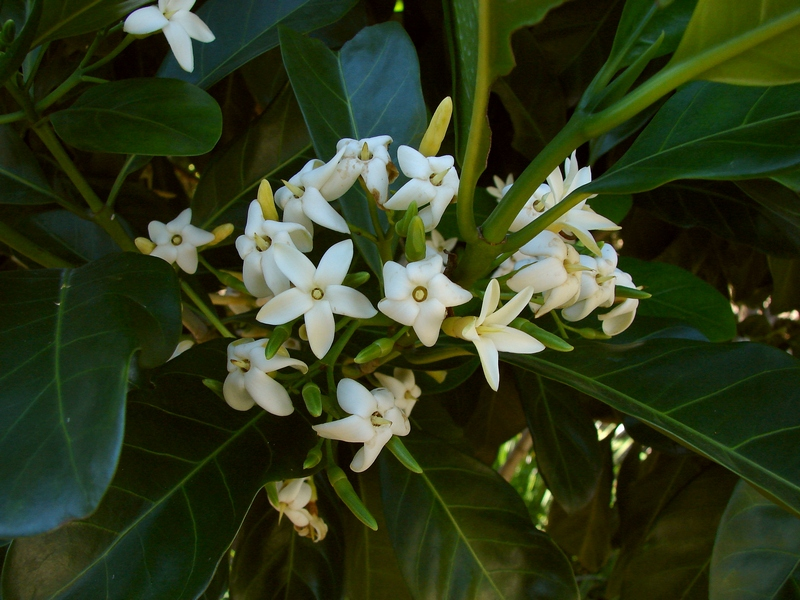

Conservation status
- Least Concern (NCA)
- Least Concern (IUCN 3.1)

Scientific classification
- Kingdom: Plantae
- Clade: Tracheophytes
- Clade: Angiosperms
- Clade: Eudicots
- Clade: Asterids
- Order: Gentianales
- Family: Rubiaceae
- Genus: Atractocarpus
- Species: A. fitzalanii

Binomial name
- Atractocarpus fitzalanii (F.Muell.) Puttock
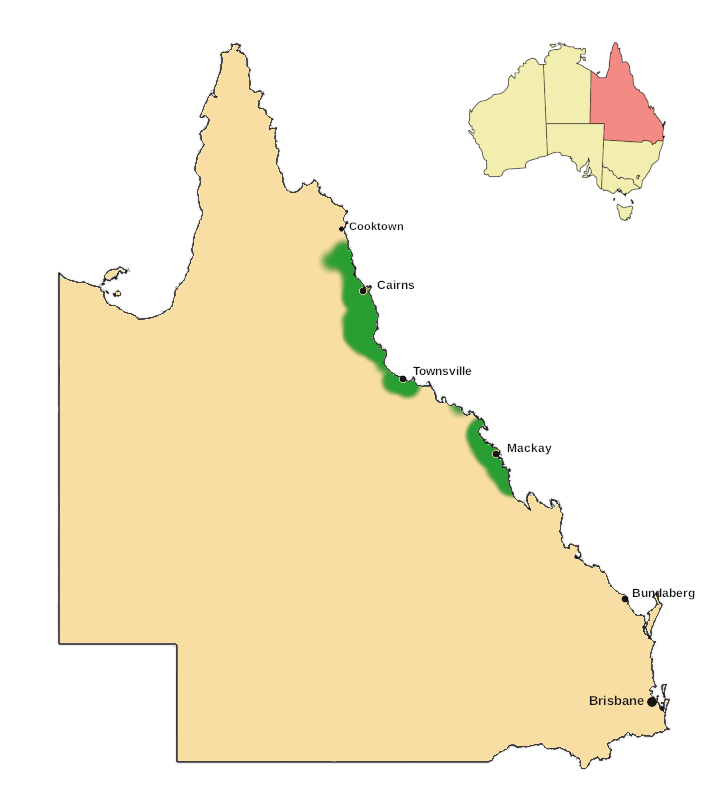

Synonyms
- Gardenia fitzalanii F.Muell.; Randia fitzalanii (F.Muell.) F.Muell. ex Benth.; Trukia fitzalanii (F.Muell.) Fosberg

= Atractocarpus fitzalanii =

Brown gardenia

Species of plant native to Australia

Atractocarpus fitzalanii, commonly known as the brown gardenia or yellow mangosteen, is a species of plant in the coffee and madder family Rubiaceae. It is found in coastal parts of tropical Queensland, Australia. The beautifully scented flowers and glossy foliage has seen this plant enter cultivation in gardens of eastern Australia.

== Description ==
The brown gardenia is a woody shrub or small tree usually growing up to 3 m (9.8 ft) wide and 8 m (26 ft) high, although it may reach up to 20 m (66 ft) on occasions, and it has a smooth grey trunk up to 35 cm (14 in) diameter. The large leaves are obovate to oval-shaped and may be up to 20 cm (7.9 in) long by 10 cm (3.9 in) wide, held on petioles up to 3 cm (1.2 in) long. They are glossy dark green above, dull grey-green below, and have an opposite arrangement. The lateral veins number 6–7 pairs and subtend an angle of 50°–70° to the midrib. The new growth is a bright lime green in colour.

This species is dioecious, meaning that male and female flowers are borne on separate plants. The inflorescences are panicles produced either terminally or in the leaf axils; male inflorescences have 15–30 flowers while female ones have up to 15 flowers. The fragrant white flowers measure about 3 cm (1.2 in) in diameter with a corolla tube about 1.5 cm (0.6 in) long.

The globose fruit is a drupe, yellow-brown in colour and measuring up to 10 cm (3.9 in) long by 9 cm (3.5 in) wide, usually produced singly or rarely in a cluster of 3–4. In the subspecies tenuipes they are paler, measure up to 3.8 cm (1.5 in) long by 3.5 cm (1.4 in) wide, and produced in clusters of 3–7. The calyx is persistent at the apex of the fruit in both subspecies.

=== Phenology ===
The subspecies fitzalanii flowers from October to February, and fruit ripen between September and March. Subspecies tenuipes flowers in October and November, while the fruit mature from May to August.

== Taxonomy ==
This species was originally described as Gardenia fitzalanii in 1860 by the German naturalist and Victorian state botanist Ferdinand von Mueller. The description was based on plant material collected by the Irish-born botanist Eugene Fitzalan during an expedition in August–October 1860 to find the mouth of the Burdekin River.

In 1866 George Bentham transferred the species to the genus Randia, where it remained for over 130 years. In 1999 the Australian botanist Christopher Francis Puttock published a revision of Atractocarpus in Australia, in which he gave this species its current combination.

=== Subspecies ===
Two subspecies are recognised:

- Atractocarpus fitzalanii subsp. fitzalanii
- Atractocarpus fitzalanii subsp. tenuipes

=== Etymology ===
The genus name Atractocarpus is derived from the Ancient Greek terms átraktos meaning 'spindle' and karpós 'fruit', and refers to the spindle-shaped fruit of the type species. The species epithet fitzalanii was given in honour of the collector. The subspecies name tenuipes is from the Latin tenuipes meaning 'slender legged', a reference to the slender pedicels displayed by the group.

== Distribution and habitat ==
A. f. subsp. fitzalanii is widespread in rainforest, monsoon forest, swamp forest, mangrove forest, and riparian forest from just south of Cooktown to just south of Mackay, at altitudes from sea level to around 1,200 m (3,900 ft).

A. f. subsp. tenuipes is found at higher altitudes from 500 to 1,500 m (1,600 to 4,900 ft) and has a more restricted range than its parent, from near Cape Tribulation to the southern Atherton Tableland.

Although the weed potential has not been studied in Australia, weed management personal of Noosa Integrated Catchment Association have found it regularly growing in bushland areas outside of its natural range distribution. Birds are known to disperse the fruit outside of cultivation giving this species a risk as a potential weed in non-native areas such as Hawaii.

== Ecology ==
Moths visit the flowers soon after opening. The fruits are eaten by a variety of birds and animals, including the cassowary (Casuarius casuarius).

== Cultivation ==
Its bushy foliage, flowers and edible fruit allow it to sometimes be used in horticultural gardens. It is suited to a shady position with good drainage in gardens, or moderately to brightly lit indoor spaces. In the city of Cairns for example, more than 280 of these have been planted as street trees.

== Gallery ==
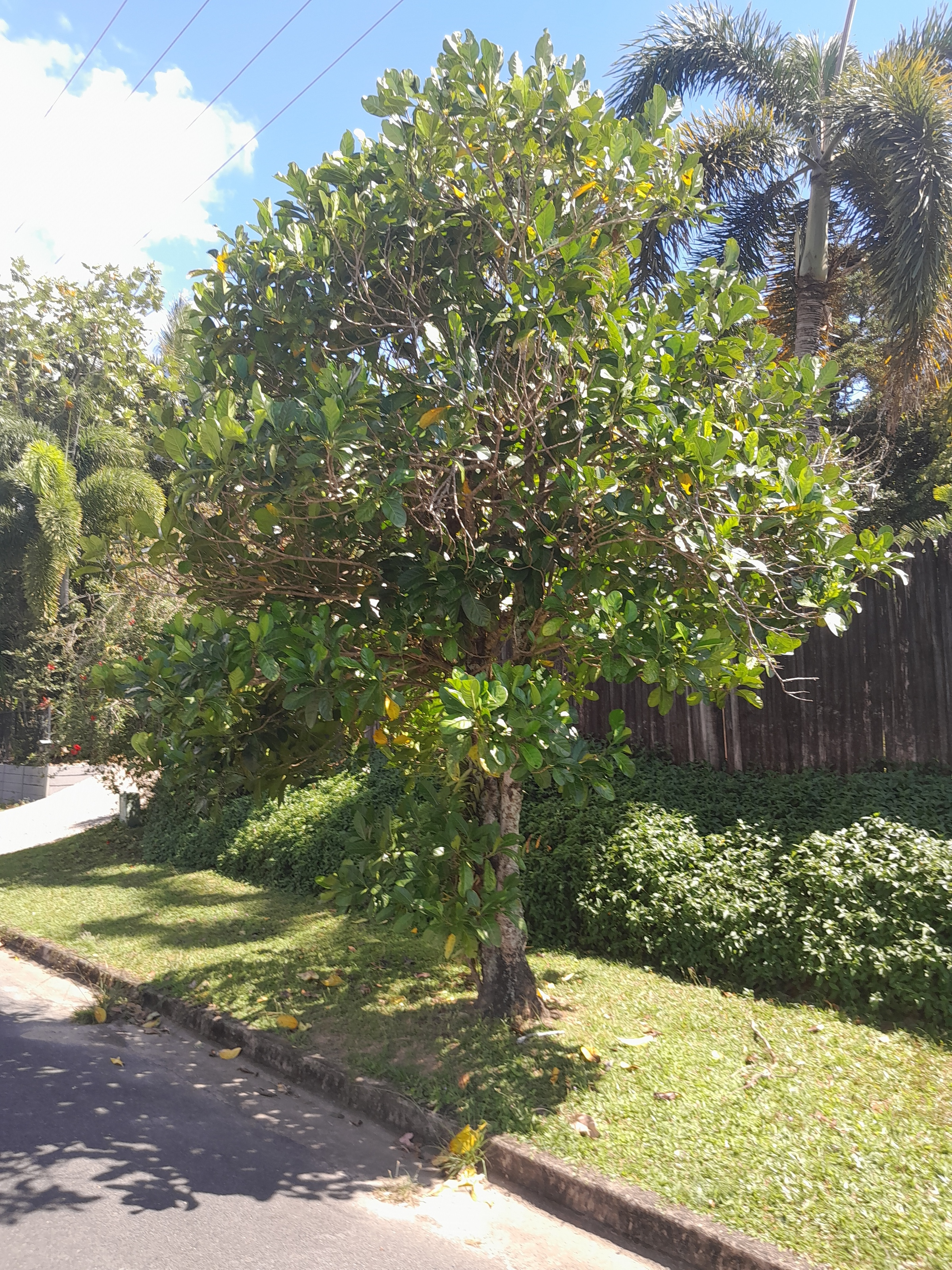
Habit

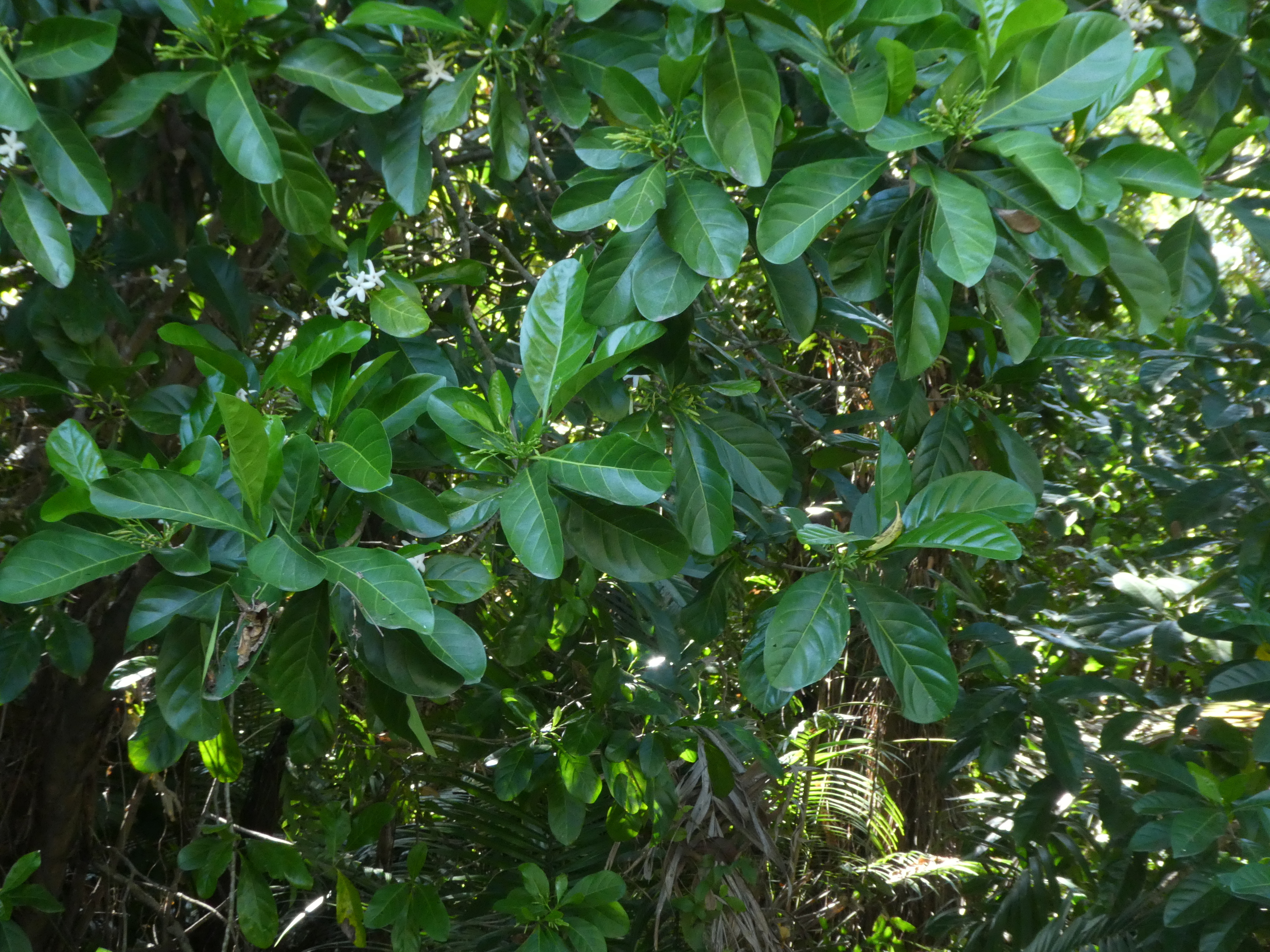
Foliage

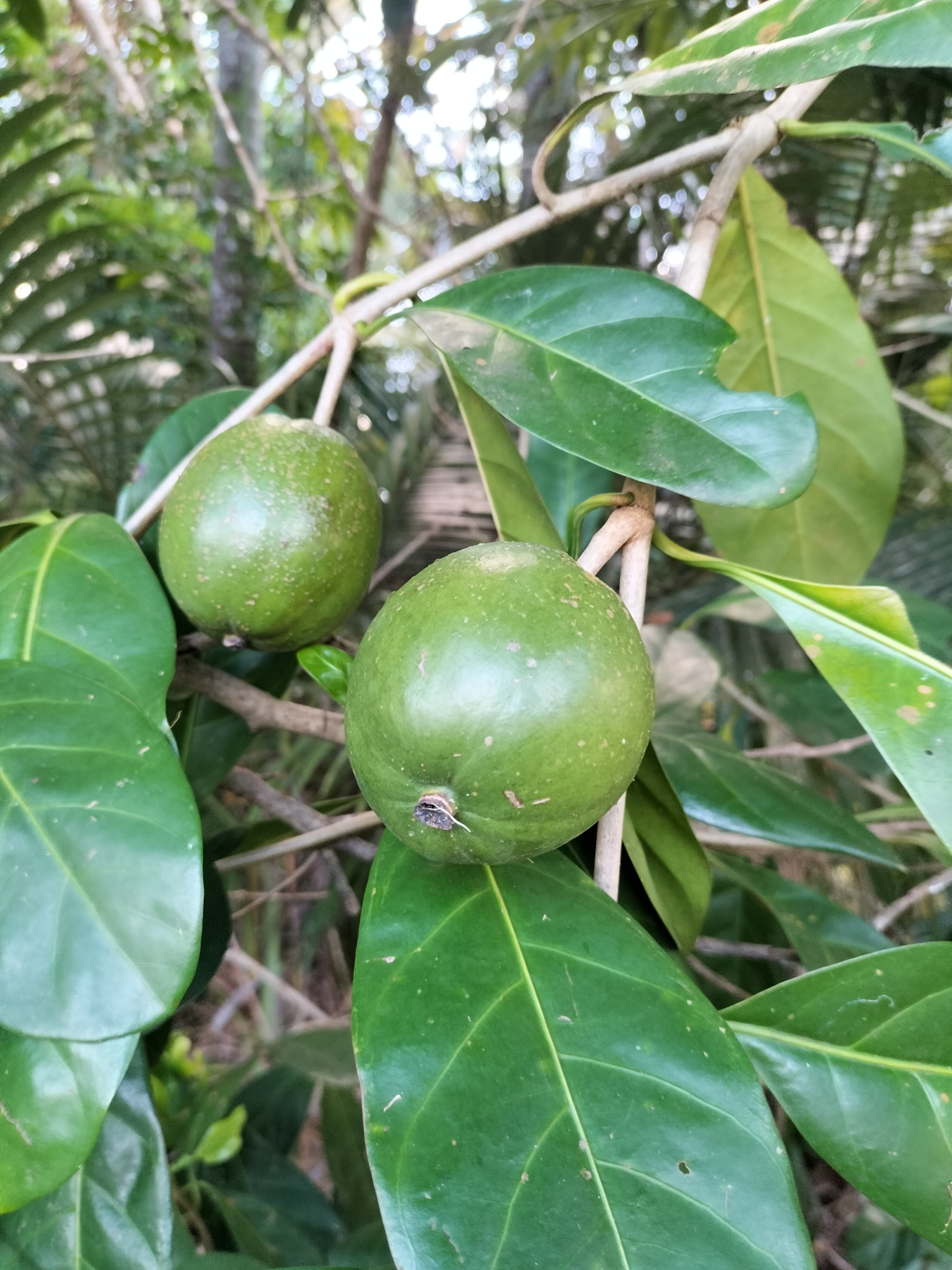
Fruit

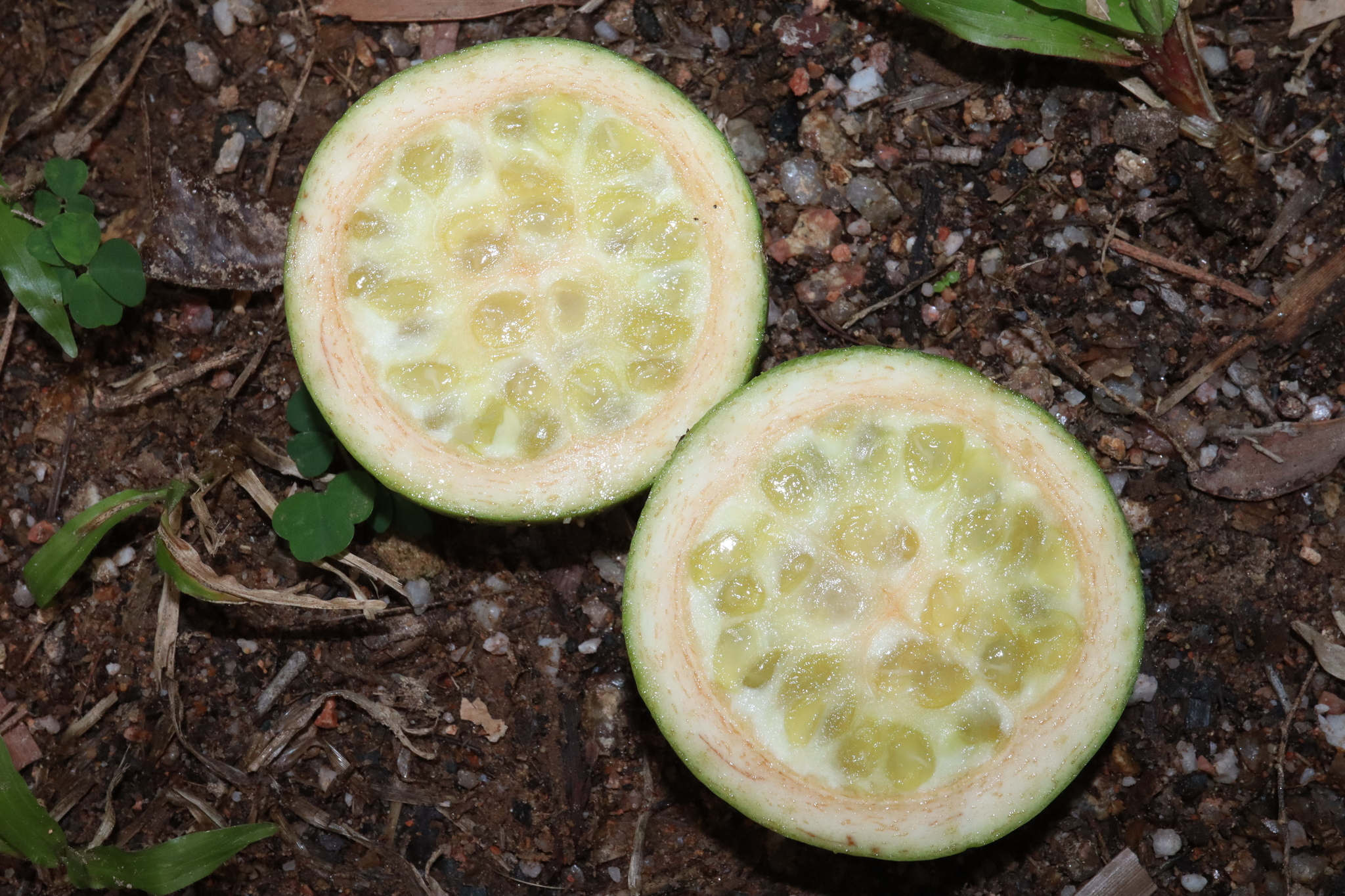
Cut fruit

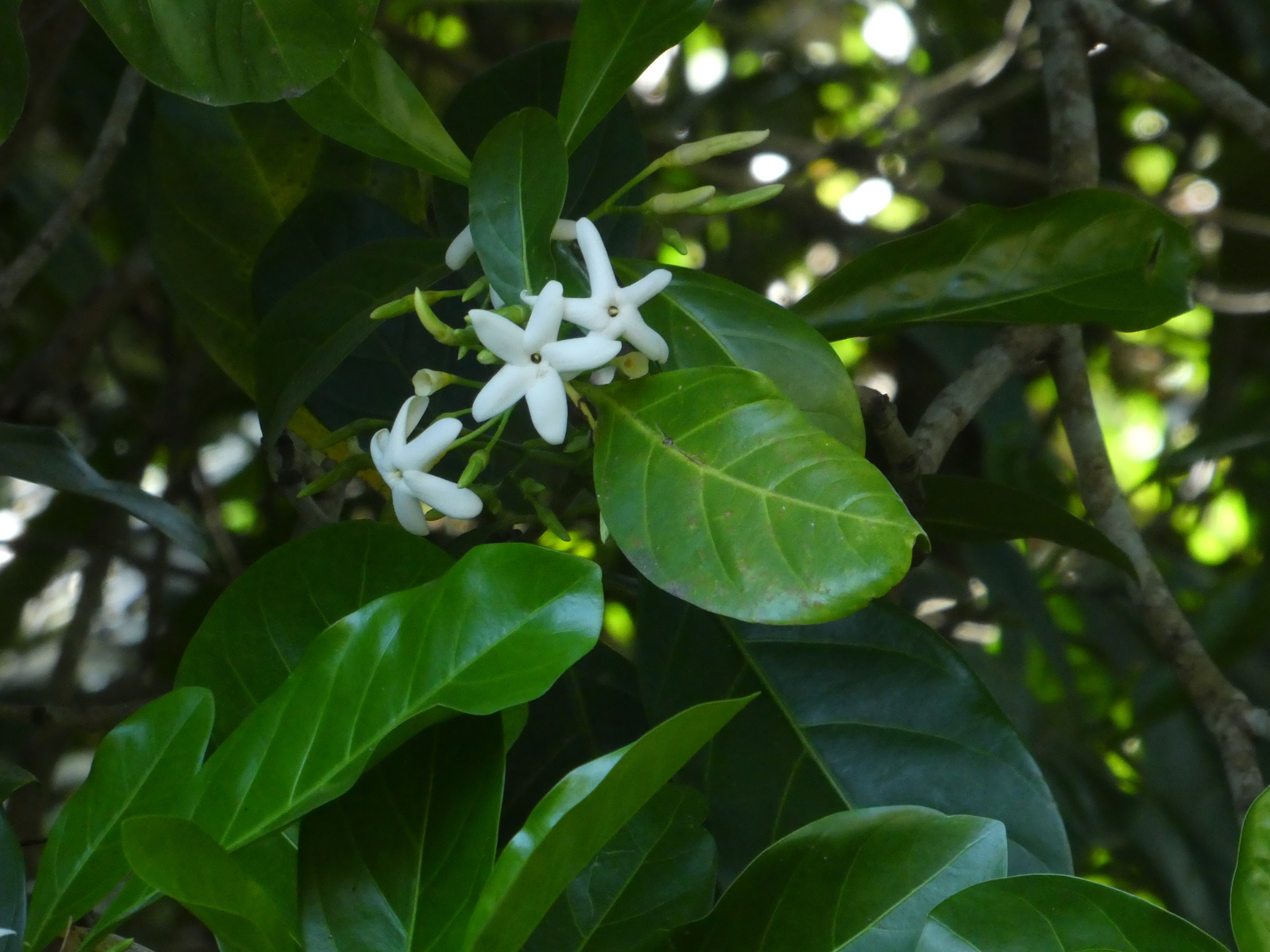
Flowers
