= Allenia (plant) =

Allenia is a taxonomic plant genus synonym that may refer to:

- Allenia Ewart = Micrantheum
- Allenia E.Phillips = Radyera
