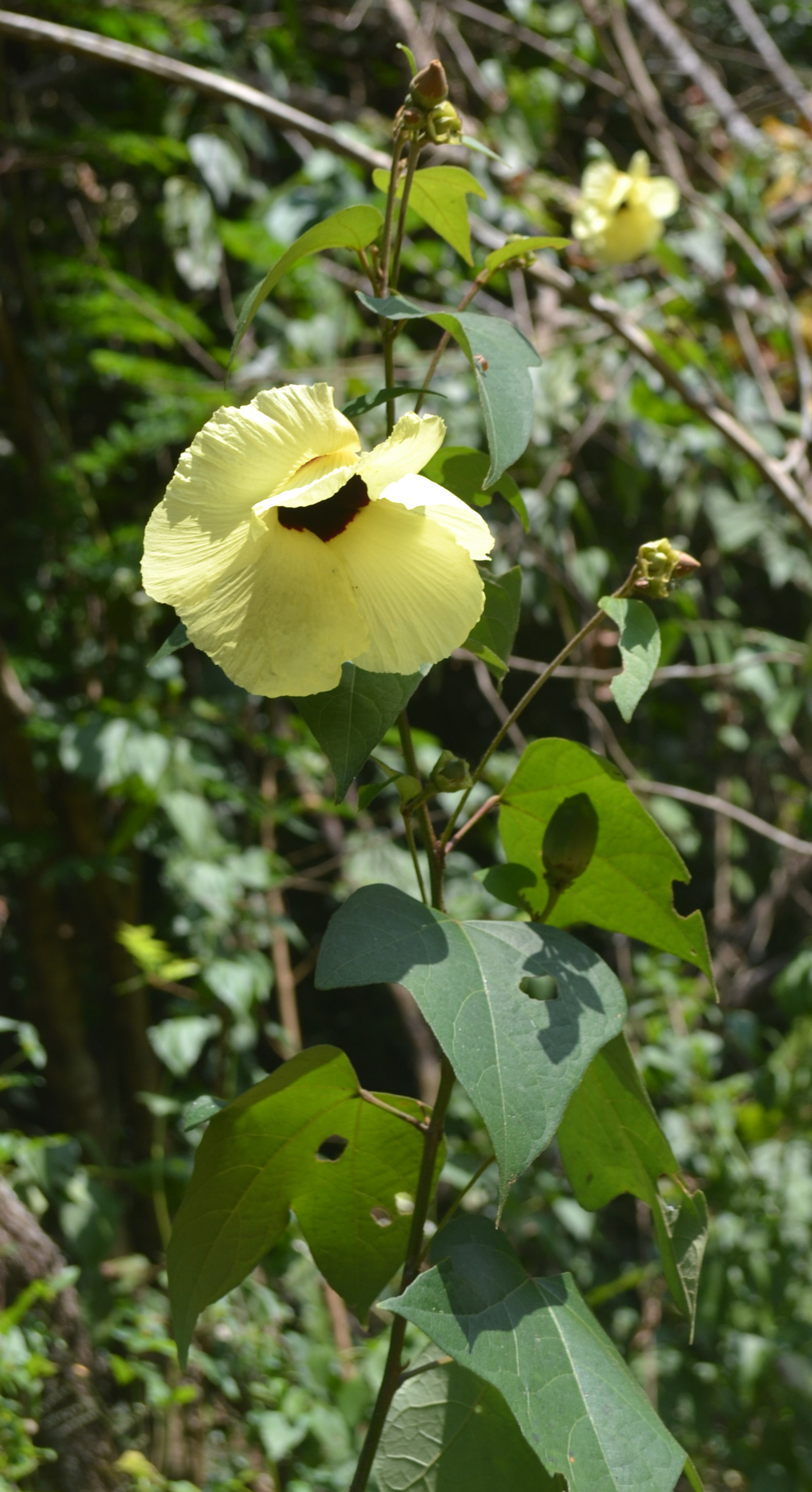
- Flowers of Azanza lampas

Scientific classification
- Kingdom: Plantae
- Clade: Tracheophytes
- Clade: Angiosperms
- Clade: Eudicots
- Clade: Rosids
- Order: Malvales
- Family: Malvaceae
- Subfamily: Malvoideae
- Tribe: Gossypieae
- Genus: Azanza; Alef.

Species
- See text

= Azanza =

Genus of flowering plants

Azanza is an Asian genus of shrubs in the family Malvaceae and tribe Gossypieae. It includes two species native to tropical Asia and tropical Australia.

== Species ==
Plants of the World Online lists two species (previously placed in Thespesia):

- Azanza lampas (Cav.) Alef. – type species – Indian subcontinent, Indochina, southern China, and Malesia
- Azanza thespesioides (R.Br. ex Benth.) F.Areces – Timor and northern Australia
