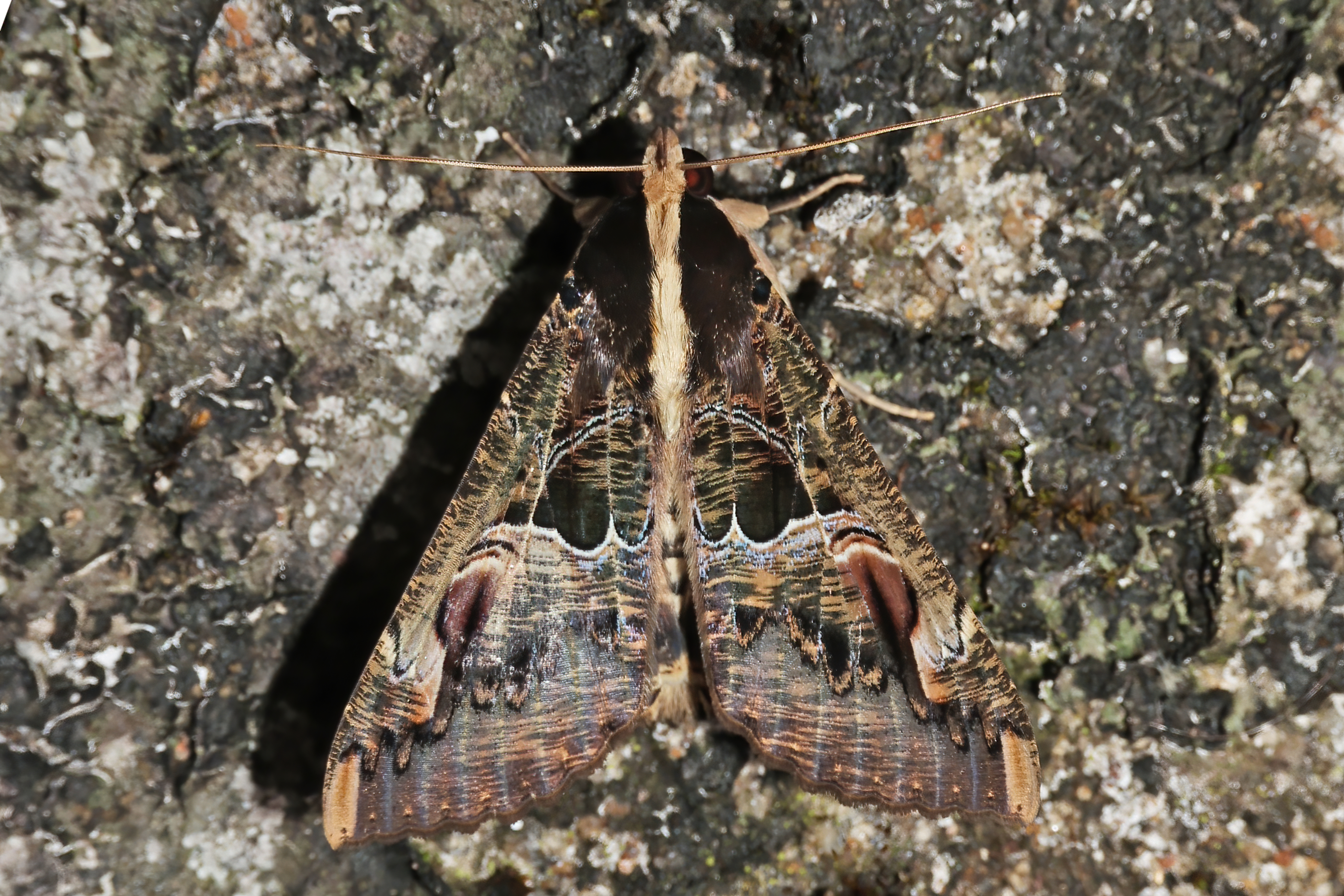
- in Sri Lanka

Scientific classification
- Kingdom: Animalia
- Phylum: Arthropoda
- Class: Insecta
- Order: Lepidoptera
- Superfamily: Noctuoidea
- Family: Erebidae
- Genus: Sphingomorpha
- Species: S. chlorea

Binomial name
- Sphingomorpha chlorea (Cramer, 1777)

= Sphingomorpha chlorea =

Sundowner moth

Species of moth

Sphingomorpha chlorea, the sundowner moth, is a species of moth in the family Erebidae that is native to Africa and southern Asia. The species was first described by Pieter Cramer in 1777. It is a fruit-piercing moth and a notorious pest in orchards. The fruit is pierced while performing a vertical and rhythmic movement of the head.

== Description ==
Its wingspan is about 60–84 mm. Head ochreous white, the basal joint of palpi dark brown. Thorax dark brown above with a broad ochreous-white stripe on vertex. Abdomen dark brown above, with a series of dorsal ochreous-white spots. Forewings reddish-brown with dark stria. There is a pale patch at base of inner margin and an indistinct antemedial angulate line. An irregularly waved medial line with pale outer edge and sometimes tinged with purple and rufous. Some vinous patches beyond it. Reniform is a narrow lunule with a vinous dash beyond it. There is a crenulate postmedial line found with medial black lunules on it and one towards inner margin, and joined by a crenulate line from near apex. A marginal black specks series also present. Hindwings are fuscous brown where the base and a diffused medial irregular band are pale. An ochreous patch with black striæ on it at center of outer margin. Cilia pale. Ventral side pale with fuscous submarginal band towards inner margin of each wing.

== Ecology ==
The adults are attracted to fermented fruit and alcoholic drinks. Its larval food plants include Acacia karoo, Thespesia garckeana, Newtonia buchananii, Sclerocarya birrea, Acacia xanthophloea, Acacia hirtella, Sclerocarya afra, Burkea africana, Acacia tortilis, Citrus, Malus pumila, Pisum sativum, Thespesia.
