= Allenia (disambiguation) =

Allenia may refer to:

- Allenia, a monotypic genus of bird in the family Mimidae
- Allenia, a synonym of the plant genus Micrantheum in the family Picrodendraceae
- Allenia, a synonym of the plant genus Radyera in the family Malvaceae
