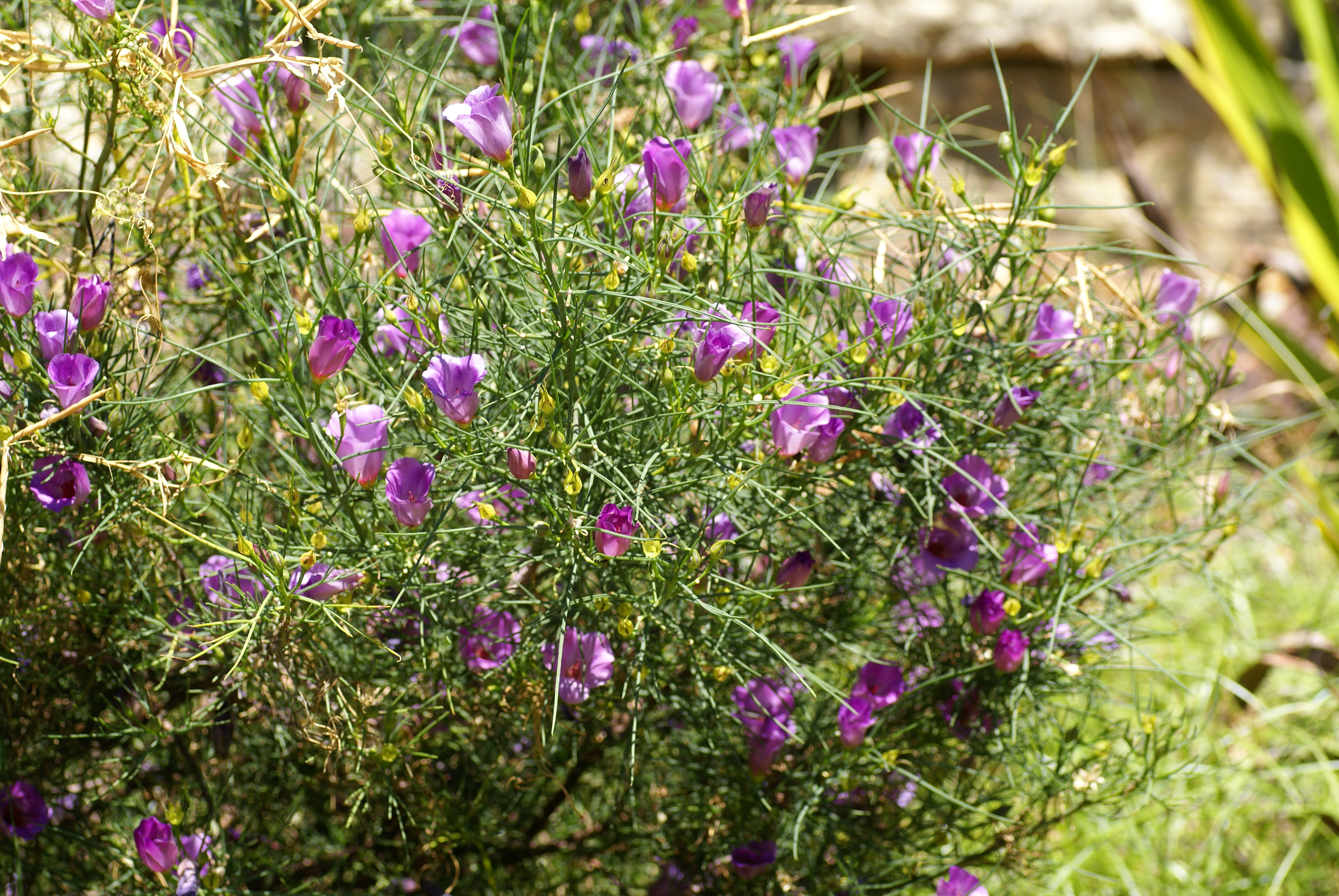

Scientific classification
- Kingdom: Plantae
- Clade: Embryophytes
- Clade: Tracheophytes
- Clade: Angiosperms
- Clade: Eudicots
- Clade: Rosids
- Order: Malvales
- Family: Malvaceae
- Genus: Alyogyne
- Species: A. hakeifolia

Binomial name
- Alyogyne hakeifolia (Giord.) Alef.

Synonyms
- Alyogyne lilacina (Lindl.) Lewton; Alyogyne multifida (Paxton) Lewton; Cienfuegosia hakeifolia (Giord.) Hochr. Cienfuegosia hakeifolia var. genuina Hochr. Cienfuegosia hakeifolia var. lilacina (Lindl.) Hochr. Fugosia hakeifolia (Giord.) Hook. Fugosia hakeifolia var. coronopifolia (Miq.) Benth. Fugosia lilacinus G.Don ex Loudon; Hibiscus caronopifolius Miq. Hibiscus hakeifolius Giord. Hibiscus lilacinus Lindl. Hibiscus multifidus Paxton; Lagunaria lilacina (Lindl.) G.Don

= Alyogyne hakeifolia =

Species of flowering plant

Alyogyne hakeifolia is a species of flowering plant in the family Malvaceae. It is endemic to the southern regions of Australia. The plant is similar to a Hibiscus and was assumed to be part of that genus for many years. It is known to have been cultivated in England since the mid nineteenth century.

== Description ==
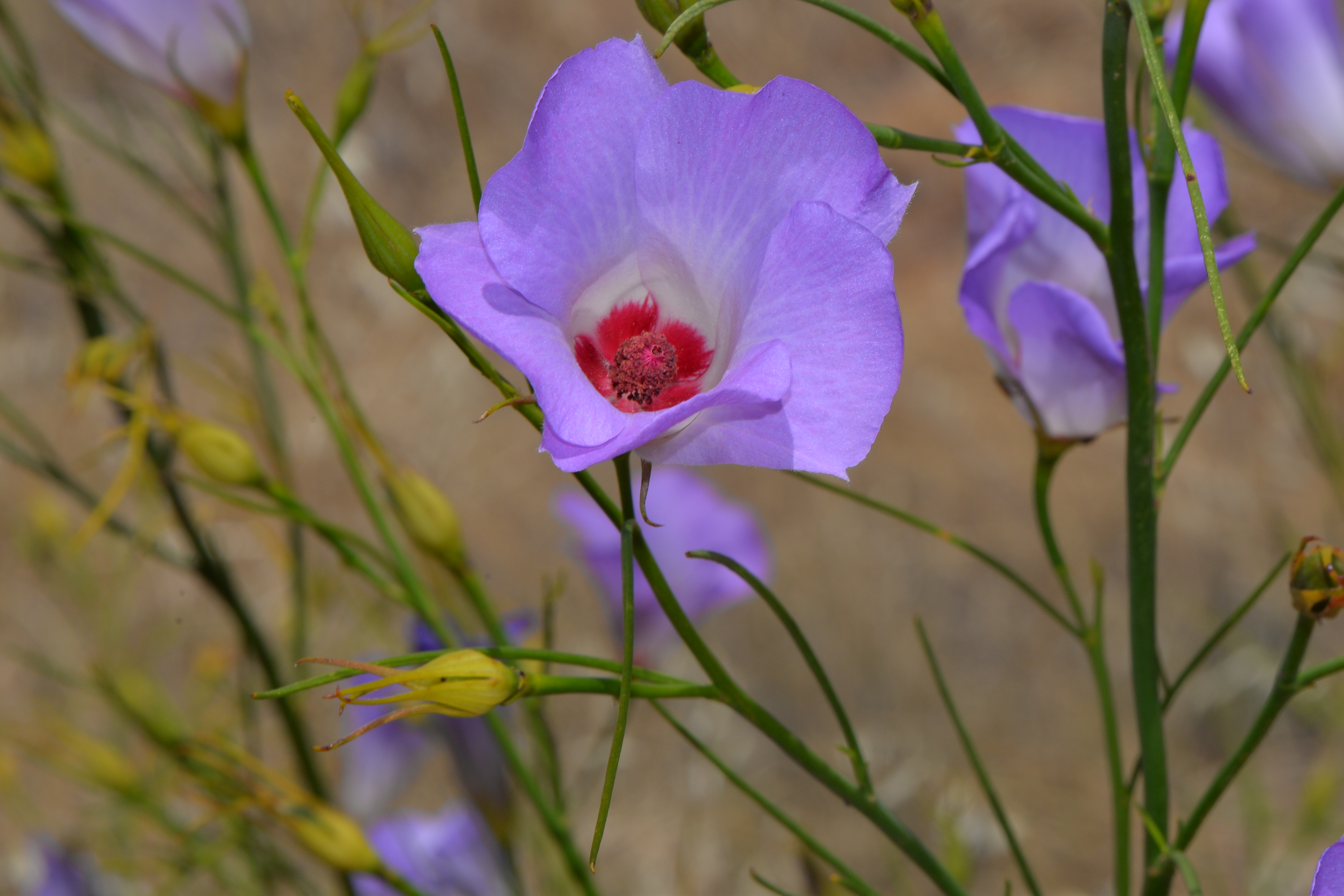
Flower closeup

An erect shrub, up to three meters high, Alyogyne hakeifolia is densely covered in fine leaves. The species is known for its rapid growth, especially under favorable conditions.

Flowering begins between May and August in its native habitat, and continues until February. The flowers are variously blue, purple, or various shades of creamy yellow; they become deeply colored and papery when spent. Blooms appear profusely after the first or second year, are deeply cupped in form, and have five large petals which open to reveal the deep red centre.

The plant can be distinguished from Hibiscus, another genus in the family Malvaceae, by the undivided stigma of the style.

== Taxonomy ==
The species was first collected in 1802 at a location in South Australia by Robert Brown, who referred to the plant as Hibiscus Filifolius. It was sketched by Ferdinand Bauer at the same time and later developed into a watercolour. Many other names were given to the species, including Hibiscus Hakeifolius, Cienfuegosia Hakeifolia, Fugosia Hakeifolia, and the synonym Alyogyne Lilacina.

The current name was given in the Österreichische botanische Zeitschrift (Austrian Botanical Magazine) by Friedrich Alefeld in 1863, after the description as 'Hakeaefolius' by Ferdinando Giordano in 1833. William Jackson Hooker also named it a Hibiscus in The Botanical Magazine in 1846.

Paul Fryxell, in the journal Australian Plants (1966), described the species as one of two in a uniquely Australian genus. Along with Hibiscus Huegelii, it was transferred in 1968 to one of four Alyogyne species.

== Distribution ==
Widely distributed throughout south west Western Australia, Alyogyne Hakeifolia is also found further east in the Eremaean botanical province. The species has a preference for undulating plains of red sand, or rocky loams, and is also found on limestone in these regions.

== Cultivation ==
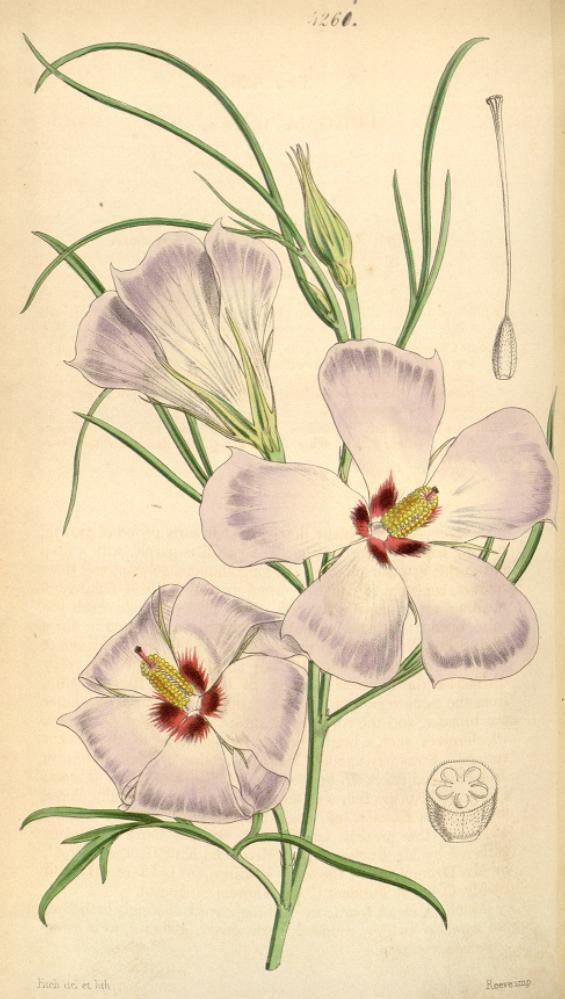
Plate 4261, The Botanical Magazine, Fugosia hakeaefolia

The natural variance of leaf form has been exploited in the selection of plants for the market. Broader and lobate leaves of some Alyogyne cultivars may have been hybridized with Alyogyne huegelii. The former name of Hibiscus hakeifolia and other synonyms are still given in some sources.

Propagation is successful by cuttings, well drained soil, avoidance of frosts and the usual caution regarding phosphorus and species from the region is recommended. The species was grown in English greenhouses during the nineteenth century and is now grown in temperate climes of the United States of America and Europe.

The species was featured in Curtis's Botanical Magazine; it gives 1846 as the year of introduction to England, by Messrs. Lucombe and Pince from 'Swan River seeds'. Writing that same year, Hooker mentions that it flowered in its first summer.
