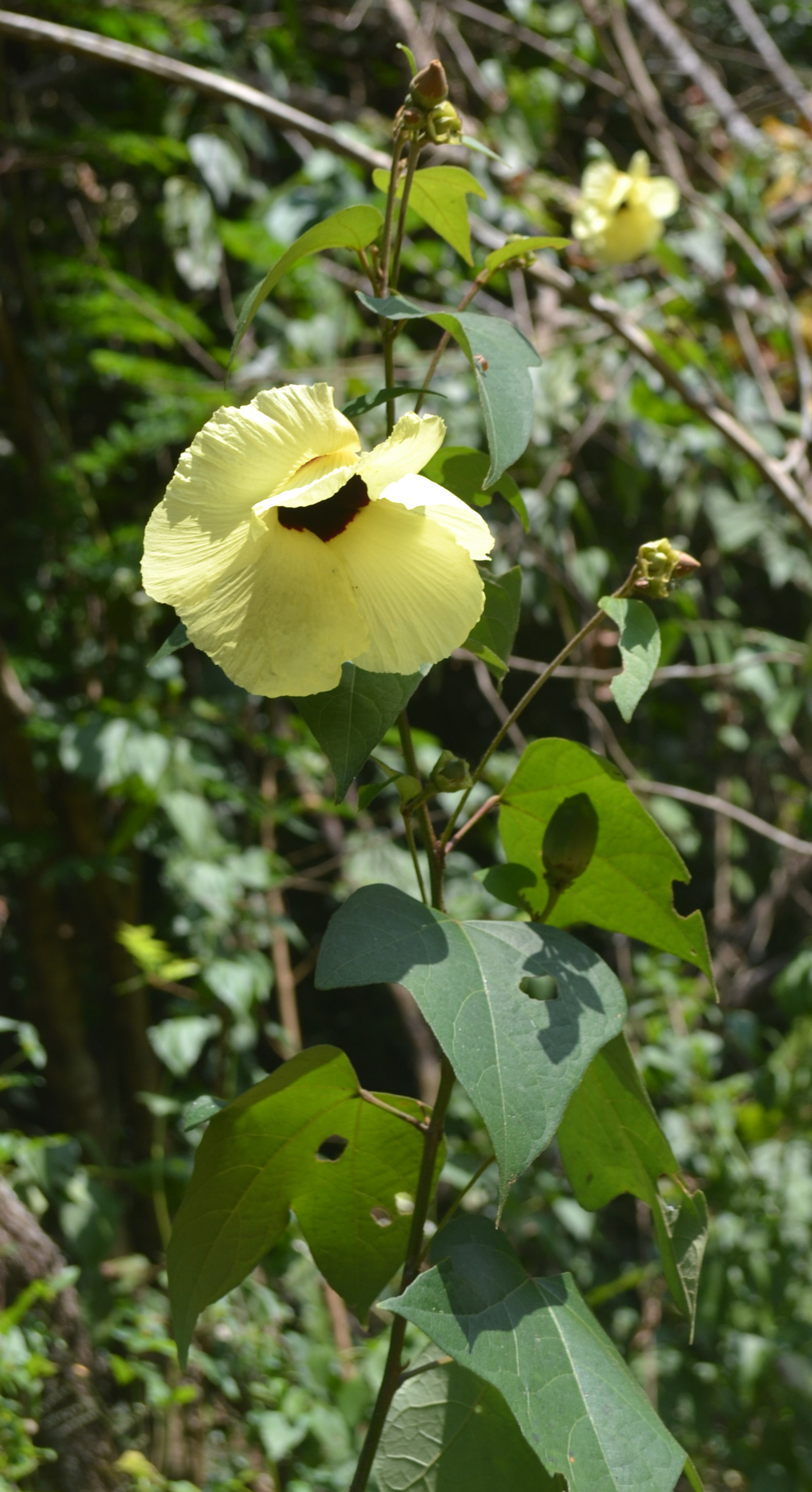
- Flowers of Azanza lampas

Scientific classification
- Kingdom: Plantae
- Clade: Tracheophytes
- Clade: Angiosperms
- Clade: Eudicots
- Clade: Rosids
- Order: Malvales
- Family: Malvaceae
- Genus: Azanza
- Species: A. lampas

Binomial name
- Azanza lampas (Cav.) Alef.

Synonyms
- Abelmoschus acuminatus (Alef.) Müll.Berol.; Abelmoschus zollingeri (Alef.) Müll.Berol.; Azanza acuminata Alef.; Azanza zollingeri Alef.; Bupariti lampas (Cav.) Rothm.; Hibiscus callosus Blume; Hibiscus gangeticus Roxb. ex Wight & Arn.; Hibiscus lampadius St.-Lag.; Hibiscus lampas Cav.; Hibiscus tetralocularis Roxb.; Pariti gangeticum G.Don; Thespesia lampas (Cav.) Dalzell; Thespesia sublobata Blanco

= Azanza lampas =

Species of flowering plant

Azanza lampas is an Asian shrub in the family Malvaceae and tribe Gossypieae; its native range is tropical and subtropical Asia. It has yellow flowers, grows up to 3 metres and in Vietnam it is called Tra nhỏ.

== Uses ==
Its roots and fruits are traditionally used to treat gonorrhea and syphilis. The paste made from its roots is used by the Korku tribe of Maharashtra and Nepal to cure jaundice.
