= Hampea reynae =

Conservation status
- Vulnerable (IUCN 2.3)

Scientific classification
- Kingdom: Plantae
- Clade: Tracheophytes
- Clade: Angiosperms
- Clade: Eudicots
- Clade: Rosids
- Order: Malvales
- Family: Malvaceae
- Genus: Hampea
- Species: H. reynae

Binomial name
- Hampea reynae Fryx.

Species of flowering plant

Hampea reynae, the majagua, is a species of flowering plant in the family Malvaceae. It is endemic to the cloud forests of El Salvador, and was first described in 1980 by Paul Fryxell.
