= Pseudabutilon thurberi =

Scientific classification
- Kingdom: Plantae
- Clade: Tracheophytes
- Clade: Angiosperms
- Clade: Eudicots
- Clade: Rosids
- Order: Malvales
- Family: Malvaceae
- Genus: Pseudabutilon
- Species: P. thurberi

Binomial name
- Pseudabutilon thurberi (A.Gray) Fryxell

Synonyms
- Abutilon thurberi A.Gray; Pseudabutilon sonorae Wiggins

Species of flowering plant

Pseudabutilon thurberi, common name Thurber's Indian mallow, is a plant native to southern Arizona, Sonora, and Chihuahua. It is an erect or decumbent subshrub less than one meter tall, with yellow flowers up to six millimeters in diameter. It occurs in shaded locations in the mountains.
