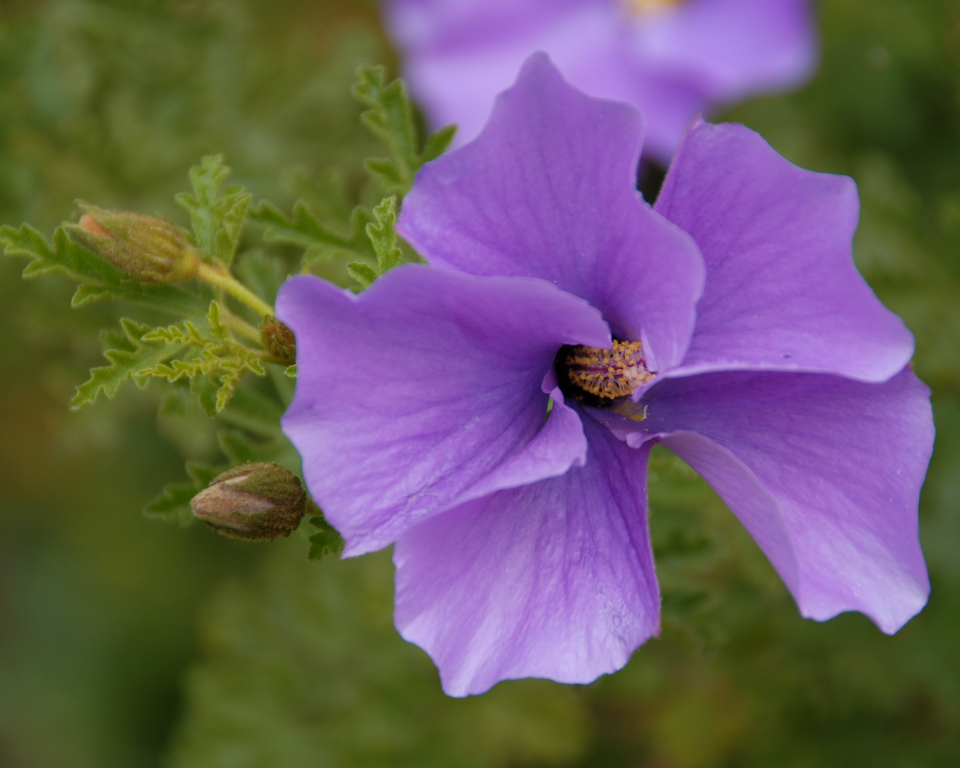
- Alyogyne huegelii

Scientific classification
- Kingdom: Plantae
- Clade: Embryophytes
- Clade: Tracheophytes
- Clade: Angiosperms
- Clade: Eudicots
- Clade: Rosids
- Order: Malvales
- Family: Malvaceae
- Subfamily: Malvoideae
- Tribe: Gossypieae
- Genus: Alyogyne; Alef.

Species
- See text

= Alyogyne =

Genus of flowering plants

Alyogyne is a genus of flowering plants in the family Malvaceae which are endemic to Australia.

== Taxonomy ==
Its species were formerly in the genus Hibiscus but were split off starting in 1863 with H. hakaeifolius. In 1915 Lewton transferred H. cuneiformis and in Fryxell (1968) H. pinonianus and H. huegelii followed. A recent revision has created many new species.

== Etymology ==
The name Alyogyne comes from the Greek words "alytos" (undivided) and "gyne" (female). "Gyne" referers to the styles which are female parts of a flower. In Hibiscus, the style is branched below the stigmas but in Alyogyne it is undivided.

== Species ==
Five species are accepted.

- Alyogyne cravenii Fryxell
- Alyogyne cuneiformis (DC.) Lewton – coastal hibiscus
- Alyogyne hakeifolia (Giord.) Alef.
- Alyogyne huegelii (Endl.) Fryxell – lilac hibiscus
- Alyogyne pinoniana (Gaudich.) Fryxell – sand hibiscus
