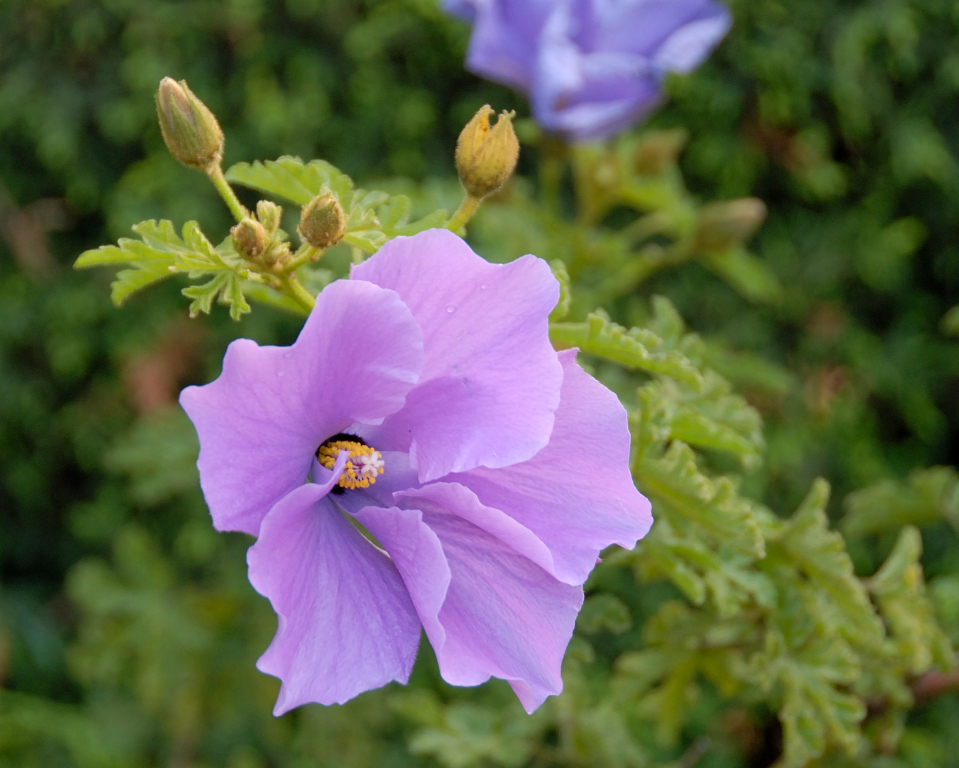

Scientific classification
- Kingdom: Plantae
- Clade: Tracheophytes
- Clade: Angiosperms
- Clade: Eudicots
- Clade: Rosids
- Order: Malvales
- Family: Malvaceae
- Genus: Alyogyne
- Species: A. huegelii

Binomial name
- Alyogyne huegelii (Endl.) Fryxell 1968

= Alyogyne huegelii =

Species of flowering plant

Alyogyne huegelii is a flowering plant found in the Southwest botanical province of Western Australia, extending along its entire coastline. A large-flowered shrub, the species favours the sands of coastal shrublands and heath.

The large flower, highly variable in colour, is similar to that of Hibiscus. It was previously placed in that genus, and is commonly named lilac hibiscus and blue hibiscus. It is widely cultivated as a flowering plant for the garden. Previously published varieties and cultivars are no longer formally recognised.

== Description ==
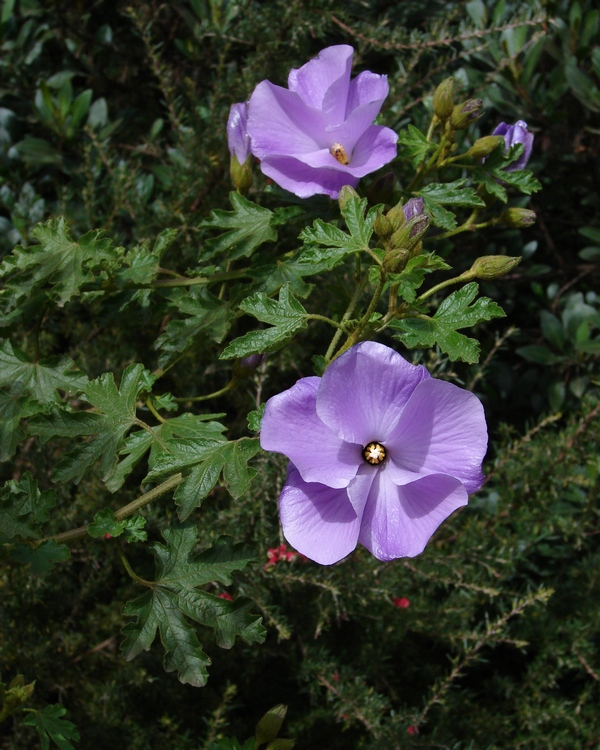
Flowers and leaves

Shrub to 4 metres with many alternate branches, although lower ones may be sparse. Bright green leaves are divided in three to five in outline; margins are irregular, lobate to toothed; pubescent and strongly veined lobes are coarse in shape. The flower stalk at the leaf axil is long, tilting at the single flower.

=== Inflorescence ===
The scented flowers have five luminous petals up to 70 mm long, these are overlapping and have slight ridges. The colour is cream or mauve, or the lilac of the name by which it is traded. The staminal tube structure contains numerous whorled anthers, these are yellow. The five styles of this are fused until the tip, which is composed of swollen and apparently divided stigma. This is supported on a five-lobed calyx, within an arrangement of up to 10 partly fused bracts.

As with all the Malvales, the flowers last around a day – becoming deeply coloured and papery when spent. They are numerous in the long flowering period between June and January.

== Taxonomy ==
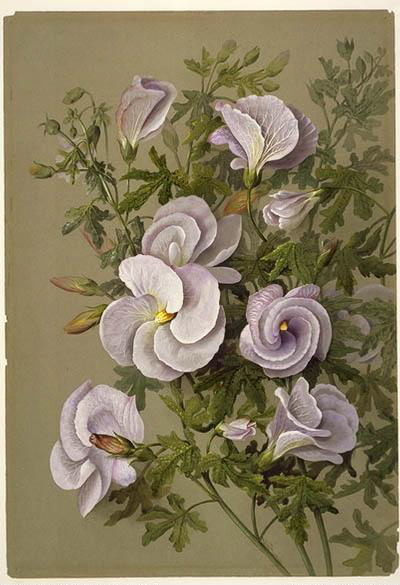
Illustration Lilac hibiscus by Ellis Rowan in the 1880s

The species was formerly placed in Hibiscus as Hibiscus huegelii, taking its name from Charles von Hügel (Baron von Huegel). The Alyogyne genus has since been revised and the varieties, such as Hibiscus huegelii var. leptochlamys (mauve) and Hibiscus huegelii var. wrayae (white) are no longer classed as subspecies or cultivars. Paul Fryxell, in the journal "Australian Plants" (1966), described the species as one of two in a uniquely Australian genus. Along with Hibiscus hakeifolia, it was transferred in 1968 to one of four Alyogyne species. Later revisions to FloraBase have included new species and previous classification of Alyogyne huegelii is being reordered within the genus. The following varieties are unpublished, though current;

- Alyogyne huegelii var. glabrescens (Benth.) A.S.Mitch. ms
- Alyogyne huegelii var. grossulariifolia (Miq.) A.S.Mitch. ms
- Alyogyne huegelii (Endl.) Fryxell var. huegelii ms

== Distribution ==
Preference for temperate and sandy coastal plains from Geraldton to the Esperance Plains, predominantly those of the north and south mallee shrubland and heath. A wide range of habitat includes that on sands, limestone and clay, and granite, where it extends to the Coolgardie region. The distribution of the Alyogyne species in South Australia is likely to be that of another species.

== Cultivation ==
A large number of variants in the species have been cultivated, the colours of white, cream, purple. lilac, mauve, and the somewhat erroneous blue are traded as varieties or cultivars. The natural variance of leaf form has also been exploited in the selection of plants for the market, fine or dissected leaves may have been hybridised with Alyogyne hakeifolia. The former name of Hibiscus huegelii, along with other synonyms, is still given in some sources.

Propagation is successful by cuttings, grown in well-drained soil, avoidance of frosts and the usual caution regarding phosphorus and species from the region is recommended. The sparse lower branching habit of the species, and inducement to a desirable habit, is achieved by heavy pruning after flowering.

The species was grown in English greenhouses during the nineteenth century and is now grown in temperate climates of the United States of America and Europe.

== Bibliography ==
- Rippey, Elizabeth; Rowland (Reinette), Barbara (2004) [1995]. Coastal Plants: Perth and the south-west region (2nd ed.). Perth: University of Western Australia Press. pp. 42, 43. ISBN 1-920694-05-6.
- ANBG staff (1976) (2003-12-16). " Alyogyne huegelii". Growing Native Plants. Australian National Botanic Gardens (ANBG). Archived from the original on 8 September 2007. "The best way to propagate A. huegelii is by half-hardened tip cuttings 7–8 cm long, although soft tip cuttings also do well."
- Colleen Keena (December 2002). "Alyogyne: An Update". Australian Plants online. Association of Societies for Growing Australian Plants. Archived from the original on 2008-01-12.
- Media related to Alyogyne huegelii at Wikimedia Commons
- Data related to Alyogyne huegelii at Wikispecies
