= Hampea sphaerocarpa =

Conservation status
- Vulnerable (IUCN 3.1)

Scientific classification
- Kingdom: Plantae
- Clade: Tracheophytes
- Clade: Angiosperms
- Clade: Eudicots
- Clade: Rosids
- Order: Malvales
- Family: Malvaceae
- Genus: Hampea
- Species: H. sphaerocarpa

Binomial name
- Hampea sphaerocarpa Fryxell

Species of flowering plant

Hampea sphaerocarpa is a species of flowering plant in the family Malvaceae. It is found in Guatemala and Honduras. It is threatened by habitat loss.
