= Hampea montebellensis =

Conservation status
- Endangered (IUCN 3.1)

Scientific classification
- Kingdom: Plantae
- Clade: Tracheophytes
- Clade: Angiosperms
- Clade: Eudicots
- Clade: Rosids
- Order: Malvales
- Family: Malvaceae
- Genus: Hampea
- Species: H. montebellensis

Binomial name
- Hampea montebellensis Fryxell

Species of flowering plant

Hampea montebellensis is a species of flowering plant in the family Malvaceae. It is a tree native to Chiapas state in southern Mexico.
