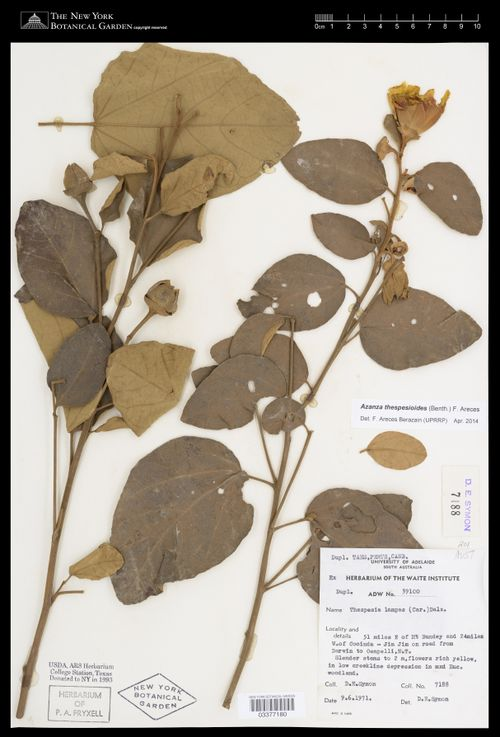
- (CC-BY 4.0, New York Botanical Garden)

Scientific classification
- Kingdom: Plantae
- Clade: Tracheophytes
- Clade: Angiosperms
- Clade: Eudicots
- Clade: Rosids
- Order: Malvales
- Family: Malvaceae
- Genus: Azanza
- Species: A. thespesioides

Binomial name
- Azanza thespesioides (R.Br. ex Benth.) F.Areces

Synonyms
- Cienfuegosia thespesioides (R.Br. ex Benth.) Hochr.; Fugosia thespesioides R.Br. ex Benth.; Gossypium thespesioides (R.Br. ex Benth.) F.Muell.; Notoxylinon thespesioides (R.Br. ex Benth.) Lewton; Thespesia lampas var. thespesioides (R.Br. ex Benth.) Fryxell; Thespesia thespesioides (R.Br. ex Benth.) Fryxell

= Azanza thespesioides =

Species of flowering plant

Azanza thespedioides is a species of flowering plant in the family Malvaceae. The species is endemic to Australia, and is found in Western Australia, the Northern Territory, and Queensland. It grows at elevations up to 380 meters in open forests and around thickets. The species was first described in 2016. In 2020, a new variety of the species, var. flaviflora was described. This variety is found in Western Australia, while the original var. thespesioides is found in the Northern Territory.

== Description ==
The species is a flowering and fruiting shrub that grows 1–2 meters tall. The leaves are 7–9 centimeters long and 5.5–7.5 cm wide with leafstalks 4–6 cm long. When the plant is young, both sides of the leaf are covered in hairs. There is a large gland near the base of the leaf on its underside along the midrib vein, branching off which there are five or six secondary veins. There are small, narrow stipule growths at the base of the leaf. The stems have strong bark and fibers. Below each flower there is an epicalyx of 4–6 leaf-like bracts which are 4–10 millimeters long. The calyx is cup-shaped, with hairs on both sides. The petals are yellow and have a dark red or purple center. Each one measures 6–7 cm long and 5–6 cm wide. The stamens are on a column 1.5–2 cm long, with much shorter individual filaments and anthers. The seed capsule is covered in straight hairs while those covering the seed are pressed flat.
