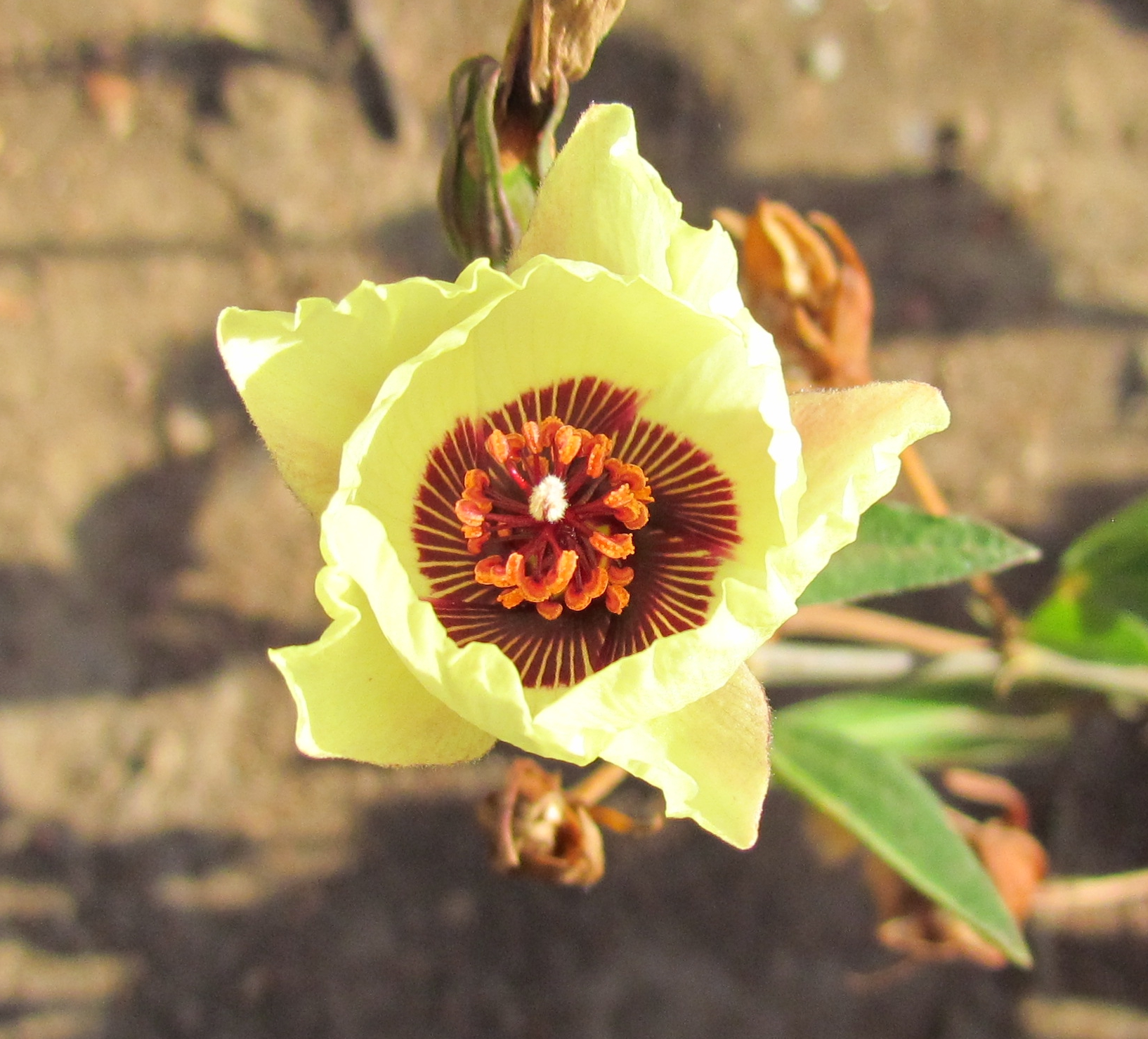
- Flower of Cienfuegosia affinis

Scientific classification
- Kingdom: Plantae
- Clade: Embryophytes
- Clade: Tracheophytes
- Clade: Spermatophytes
- Clade: Angiosperms
- Clade: Eudicots
- Clade: Rosids
- Order: Malvales
- Family: Malvaceae
- Subfamily: Malvoideae
- Tribe: Gossypieae
- Genus: Cienfuegosia; Cav., 1786

Species
- see text

Synonyms
- Elidurandia Buckley; Fugosia Juss.; Redoutea Vent.

= Cienfuegosia =

Genus of flowering plants

Cienfuegosia is a genus of plants, in the family Malvaceae and placed in the tribe Gossypieae. Species can be found in central and south America, Africa including the Arabian peninsula.

They are typically herbs with woody rootstocks, or small shrubs, usually with conspicuous glands. Leaves lobed or unlobed; stipules minute to large and leafy. Flowers are solitary in leaf axils or in 2-flowered cymes.

== Species ==
Plants of the World Online lists:

- Cienfuegosia affinis (Kunth) Hochr.
- Cienfuegosia angustifolia Krapov.
- Cienfuegosia argentina (Kuntze) Gürke
- Cienfuegosia conciliata Krapov.
- Cienfuegosia digitata Cav. – type species
- Cienfuegosia drummondii (A.Gray) Lewton
- Cienfuegosia gerrardii (Harv.) Hochr.
- Cienfuegosia hassleriana Hochr.
- Cienfuegosia heteroclada Sprague
- Cienfuegosia heterophylla (Vent.) Garcke
- Cienfuegosia hildebrandtii Garcke
- Cienfuegosia hispida R.E.Fr.
- Cienfuegosia hitchcockii (Ulbr. ex Kearney) O.J.Blanch.
- Cienfuegosia humbertiana (Hochr.) Fryxell
- Cienfuegosia integrifolia (Chodat & Hassl.) Fryxell
- Cienfuegosia intermedia Fryxell
- Cienfuegosia lanceolata (A.St.-Hil.) Krapov.
- Cienfuegosia rosei Fryxell
- Cienfuegosia saraviae Krapov.
- Cienfuegosia schulzii Krapov.
- Cienfuegosia subprostrata Hochr.
- Cienfuegosia sulfurea (A.St.-Hil.) Garcke
- Cienfuegosia tripartita (Kunth) Gürke
- Cienfuegosia ulmifolia Fryxell
- Cienfuegosia welshii (T.Anderson) Garcke
- Cienfuegosia yucatanensis Millsp.
