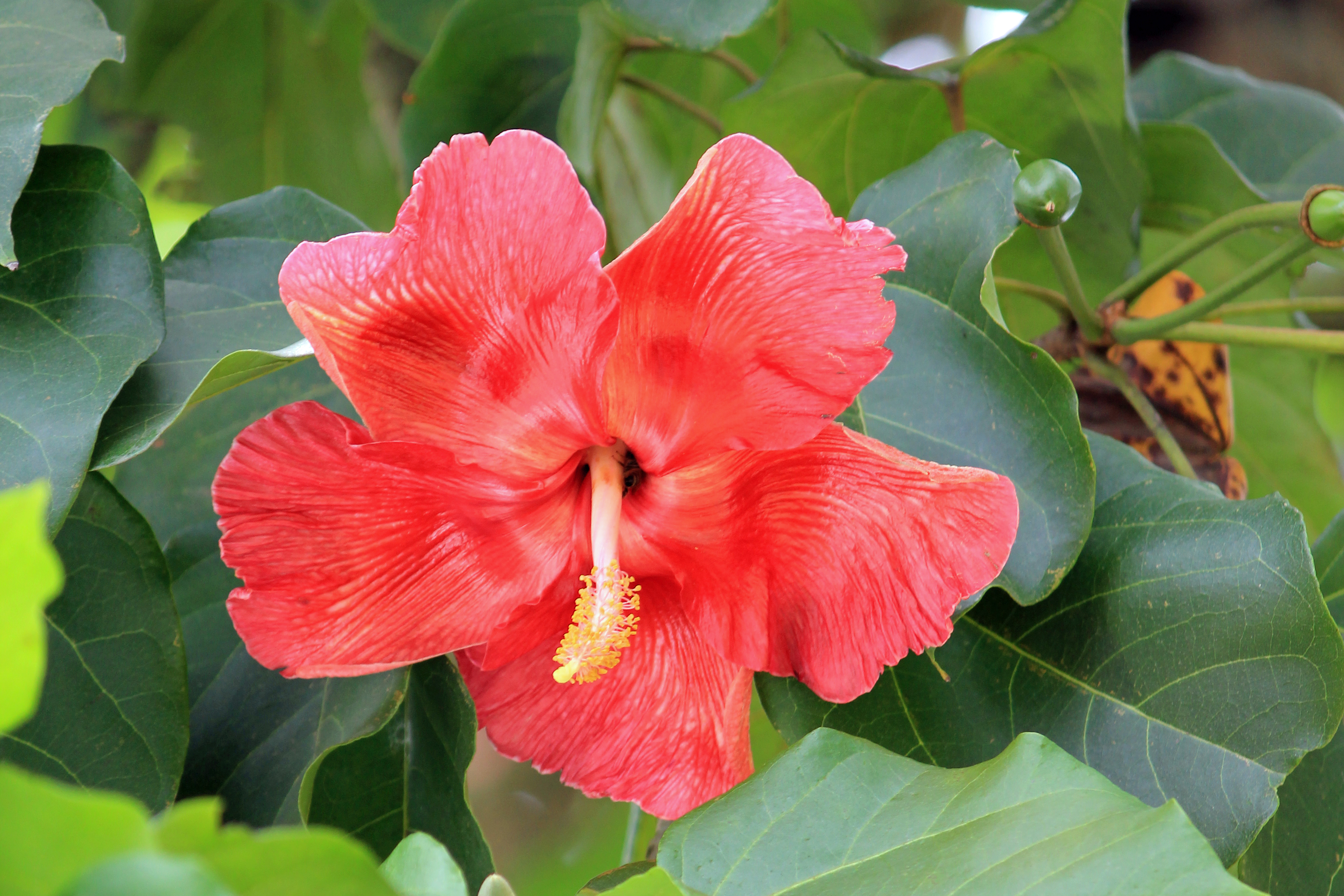
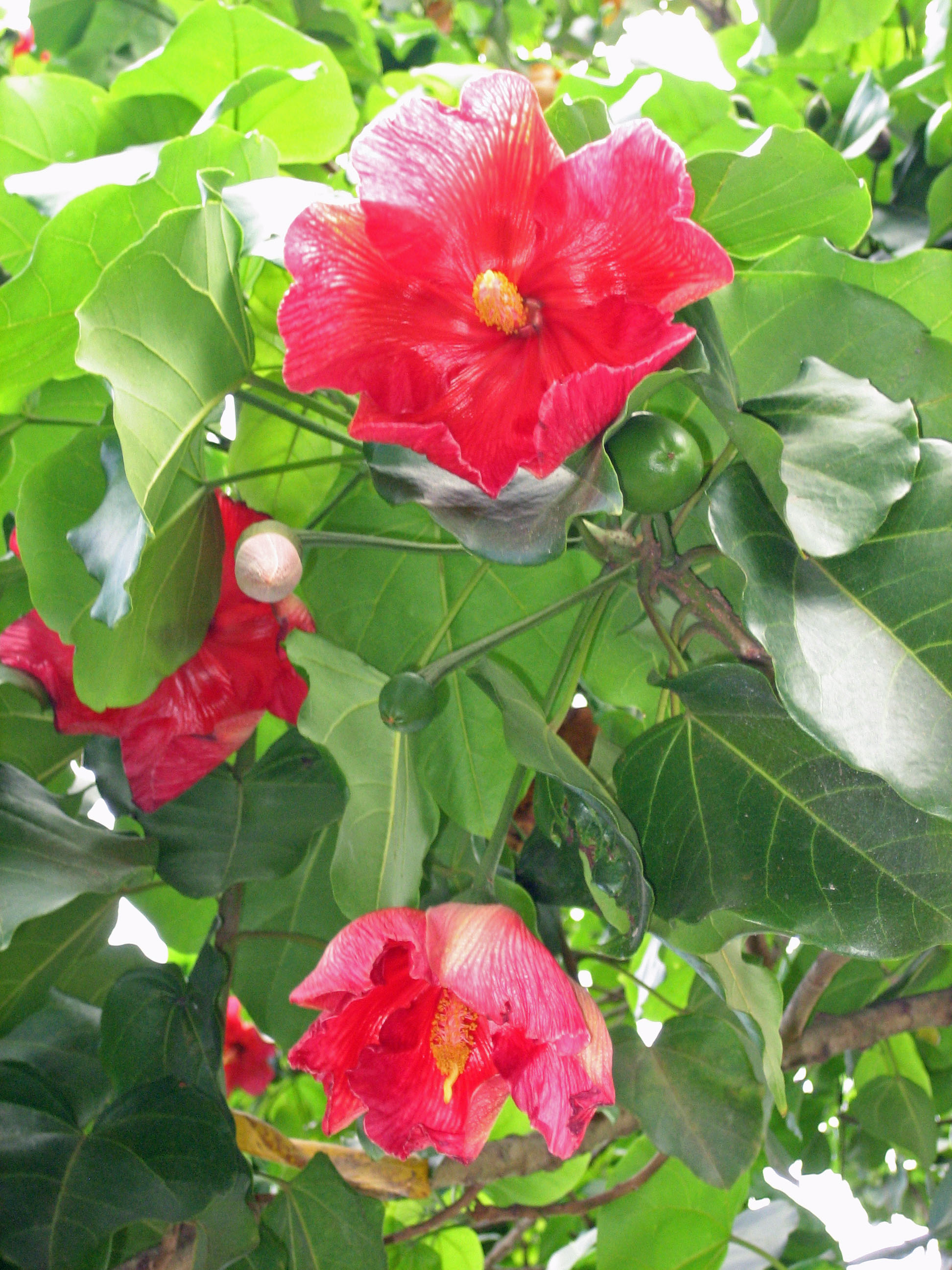
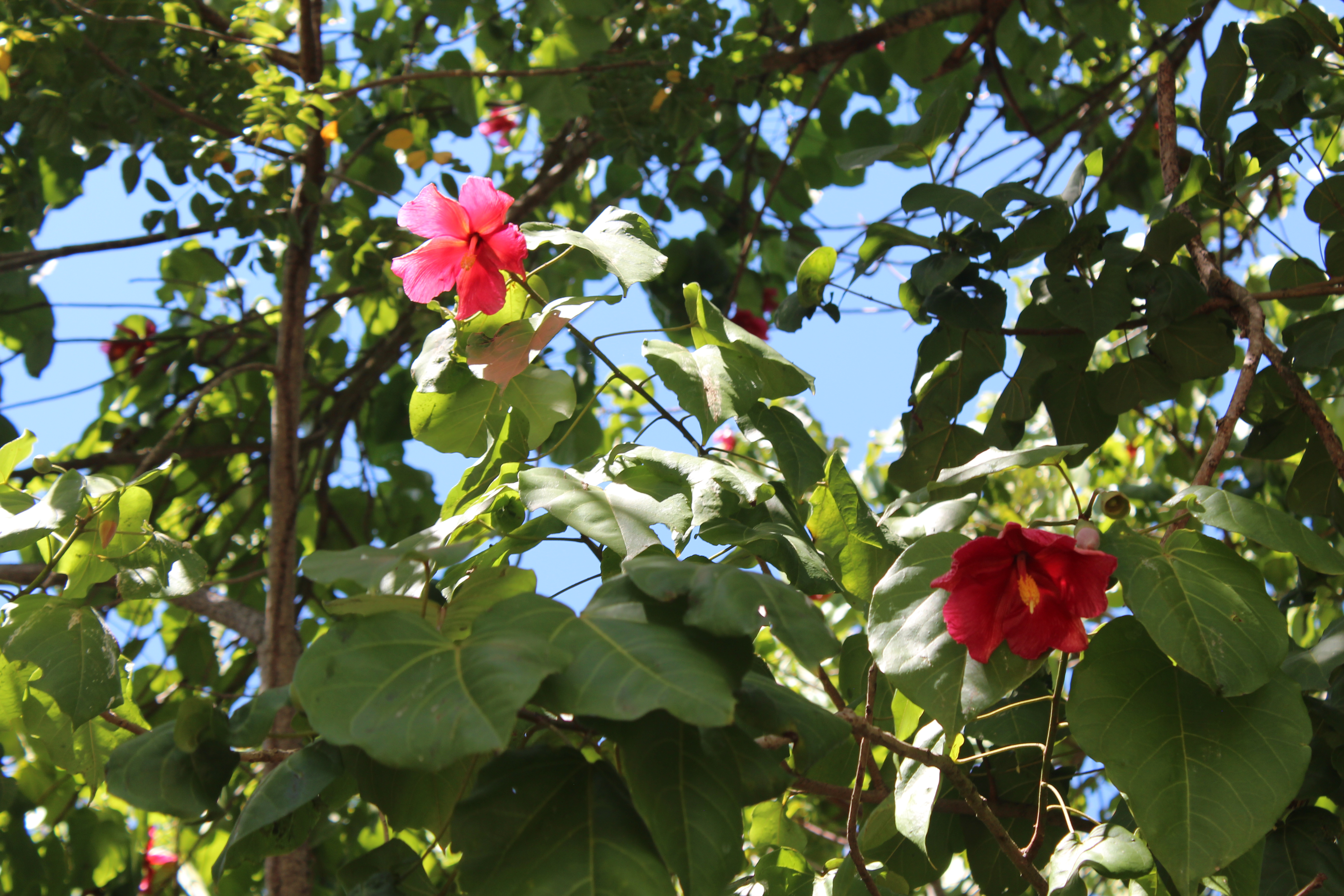
- From top, left to right: Close-up of the maga flower in Adjuntas; and wide view of the maga tree in Manatí

Scientific classification
- Kingdom: Plantae
- Clade: Tracheophytes
- Clade: Angiosperms
- Clade: Eudicots
- Clade: Rosids
- Order: Malvales
- Family: Malvaceae
- Genus: Thespesia
- Species: T. grandiflora

Binomial name
- Thespesia grandiflora DC.

Synonyms
- Montezuma speciosissima DC.

= Thespesia grandiflora =

Species of plant

Thespesia grandiflora, most commonly known as maga and maga colorada ("red-colored maga"), and also erroneously referred to as amapola (a Puerto Rican term for hibiscus), is a tree in the Malvaceae family of the rosids clade endemic to Puerto Rico, where its flower is officially recognized as national flower. Originally native to the humid, lower limestone mountains of the Cordillera Central and the Northern Karst Belt in the western and north-central regions of the main island, it grows everywhere in the archipelago due to its extensive cultivation. The maga is mostly used as an ornamental plant, but like the related portia, its wood is also valued for its durable timber. It is grown as an ornamental tree in Florida, Hawaii, Honduras, and various Caribbean islands.

Though the maga is contained within the same family as hibiscus and may sometimes be referred to as such in English and amapola in Puerto Rican Spanish, truly it belongs to a different genus, and is more closely related to cotton.

== Flower ==
The flower of the maga tree is the official national flower of Puerto Rico.

The flowers are red to pink in color with year-round flowering. The flowers are five-petalled with prominent pistils. Pendents on long stems can be observed. The fruits have three or four seeds. The leaves have an alternate arrangement on stems.

== Tree ==
The maga tree grows to reach about 50 feet in height and 20 feet across. The bark of the tree is dark-colored with noticeably furrowed texture. The hard wood of the tree is considered durable and termite resistant, as a result is often used for fence posts and furniture.

== Bibliography ==
- Bailey, L.H. 1941. The standard cyclopedia of horticulture. New York: Macmillan. 3,639 p.
- Calvesbert, Robert, Jr. 1970. Climate of Puerto Rico and U.S. Virgin Islands. Climatology of the United States 60-52. Silver Spring, MD: U.S. Department of Commerce, Environmental Science Service Administration, Environmental Data Service. 29 p.
- Holdridge, L.R. 1942. Trees of Puerto Rico. Occasional Paper 1. Río Piedras, PR: U.S. Department of Agriculture, Forest Service, Tropical Forest Experiment Station. 105 p. Vol. 1.
- Holdridge, L.R. 1967. Life zone ecology. San José, Costa Rica: Tropical Science Center. 206 p.
- Joland, S.D.; Wiedhopt, R.M.; Cole, J.R. 1975. Tumor inhibitory agent from Montezuma speciosissima (Malvaceae). Journal of Pharmaceutical Sciences. 64(11): 1889-1890.
- Liogier, Henri A.; Martorell, Luis F. 1982. Flora of Puerto Rico and adjacent islands: a systematic synopsis. Río Piedras, PR: Editorial de la Universidad de Puerto Rico. 342 p.
- Little, Elbert L., Jr.; Wadsworth, Frank H. 1964. Common trees of Puerto Rico and the Virgin Islands. Agric. Handb. 249. Washington, DC: U.S. Department of Agriculture. 548 p.
- Marrero, José. 1942. A seed storage study of maga. Caribbean Forester. 3(4): 173-184.
- Marrero, José. 1947. A survey of the forest plantations in the Caribbean National Forest. Ann Arbor, MI: University of Michigan. 167 p. Tesis de M.S.
- Marrero, José. 1948. Forest planting in the Caribbean National Forest: past experience as a guide for the future. Caribbean Forester. 1: 85-213.
- Martorell, Luis F. 1975. Annotated food plant catalog of the insects of Puerto Rico. Río Piedras, PR: Agricultural Experiment Station. 303 p.
- Neal, Marie C. 1965. In gardens of Hawaii. Special Publication 50. Honolulú: Bernice P. Bishop Press. 924 p.
- Sapath, D.S.; Balaram, P. 1986. Resolution of racemic gossypol and interaction of individual enantiomers with serum albumins and model peptides. Biochimica et Biophysica Acta. 882(2): 183-186.
- Schubert, Thomas H. 1979. Trees for urban use in Puerto Rico and the Virgin Islands. Gen. Tech. Rep. SO-27. New Orleans, LA: U.S. Department of Agriculture, Forest Service, Southern Forest Experiment Station. 91 p.
- Weaver, Peter L. 1987. Tree growth in several tropical forests of Puerto Rico. Res. Pap. SO-152. New Orleans, LA: U.S. Department of Agriculture, Forest Service, Southern Forest Experiment Station. 15 p.
- Wolcott, George N. 1939. The entomologist looks at maga. Caribbean Forester. 1(1): 29-30.
- Wolcott, George N. 1940. A list of woods arranged according to their resistance to the attack of the “polilla”, the dry-wood termite of the West Indies. Caribbean Forester. 1(4): 1-10.
