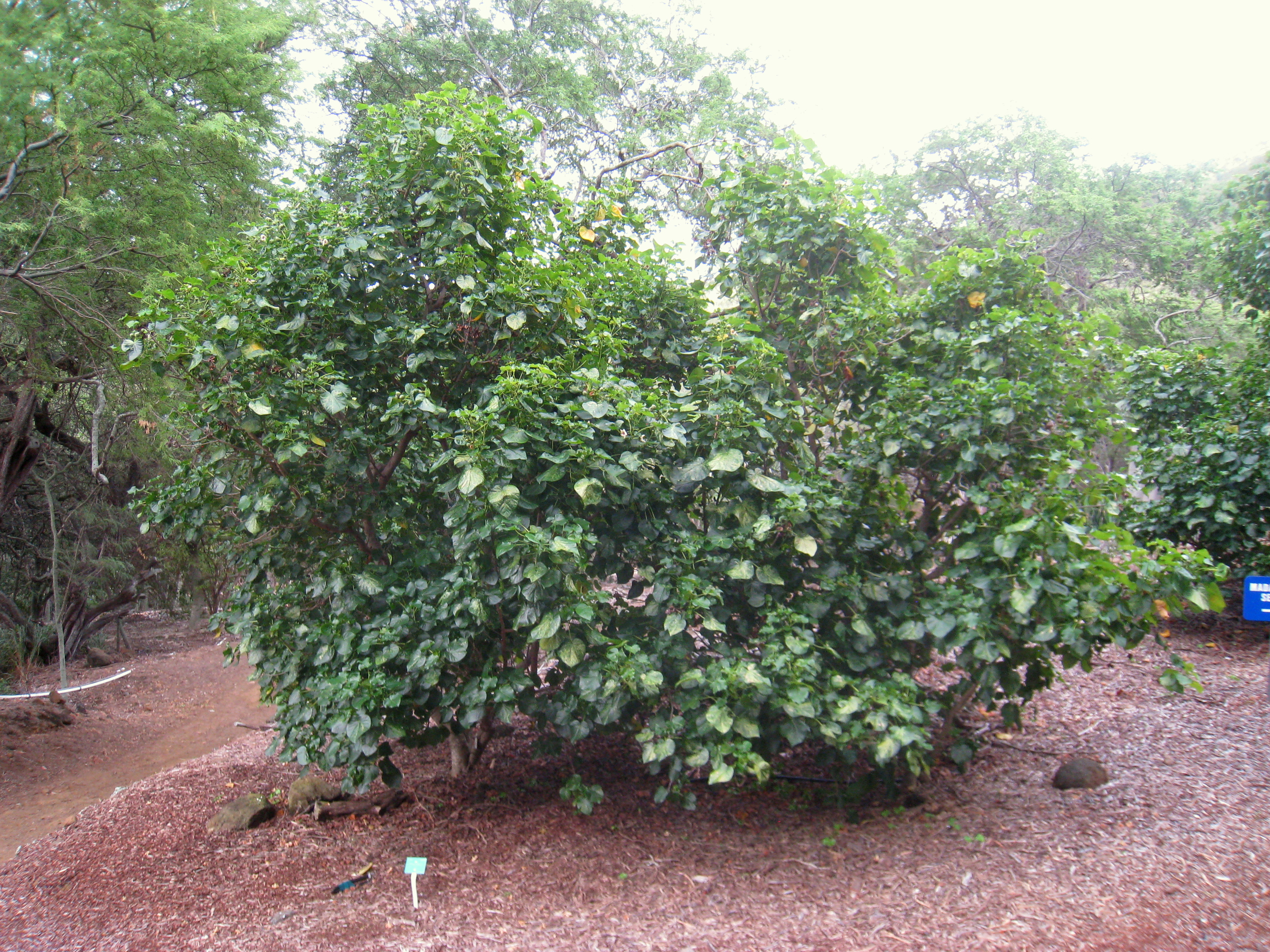

Conservation status
- Endangered (IUCN 2.3)

Scientific classification
- Kingdom: Plantae
- Clade: Tracheophytes
- Clade: Angiosperms
- Clade: Eudicots
- Clade: Rosids
- Order: Malvales
- Family: Malvaceae
- Subfamily: Malvoideae
- Tribe: Gossypieae
- Genus: Lebronnecia; Fosberg & Sachet (1966)
- Species: L. kokioides

Binomial name
- Lebronnecia kokioides Fosberg & Sachet (1966)

= Lebronnecia =

Genus of shrubs

Lebronnecia is a monotypic genus of flowering plants in the family Malvaceae. The sole species is Lebronnecia kokioides, a very rare flowering shrub.

== Distribution ==
Only a few hundred specimens are known to exist. The plant was first described in 1966, after a single tree with a few seedlings was discovered on Tahuata, an island in the Marquesas group of French Polynesia that had been severely deforested by livestock: cattle, goats, horses, and pigs.

Further specimens were later found on the nearby island of Mohotani, uninhabited by humans, but similarly deforested by sheep, who seem to avoid eating the plant.

It is now being cultivated in Hawaii.
