= Thespesia cubensis =

Conservation status
- Endangered (IUCN 2.3)

Scientific classification
- Kingdom: Plantae
- Clade: Tracheophytes
- Clade: Angiosperms
- Clade: Eudicots
- Clade: Rosids
- Order: Malvales
- Family: Malvaceae
- Genus: Thespesia
- Species: T. cubensis

Binomial name
- Thespesia cubensis (Britton & P.Wilson) J.B.Hutch.

Synonyms
- Atkinsia cubensis (Britton & P.Wilson) R.A.Howard; Maga cubensis Britton & P.Wilson; Montezuma cubensis (Britton & P.Wilson) Urb.

Species of flowering plant

Thespesia cubensis is a species of flowering plant in the family Malvaceae. It is found only in Cuba. It is threatened by habitat loss.
