= Thespesia mossambicensis =

Conservation status
- Least Concern (IUCN 3.1)

Scientific classification
- Kingdom: Plantae
- Clade: Tracheophytes
- Clade: Angiosperms
- Clade: Eudicots
- Clade: Rosids
- Order: Malvales
- Family: Malvaceae
- Genus: Thespesia
- Species: T. mossambicensis

Binomial name
- Thespesia mossambicensis Exell & Hillcoat

Synonyms
- Thespesiopsis mossambicensis Exell & Hillc.

Species of flowering plant

Thespesia mossambicensis is a species of flowering plant in the mallow family, Malvaceae, that is endemic to Mozambique.
