= Hampea micrantha =

Conservation status
- Least Concern (IUCN 3.1)

Scientific classification
- Kingdom: Plantae
- Clade: Tracheophytes
- Clade: Angiosperms
- Clade: Eudicots
- Clade: Rosids
- Order: Malvales
- Family: Malvaceae
- Genus: Hampea
- Species: H. micrantha

Binomial name
- Hampea micrantha A.Robyns

Species of flowering plant

Hampea micrantha is a species of flowering plant in the family Malvaceae. It is found only in Panama. It is threatened by habitat loss. The species occurs in rainforest up to 1,000 m.
