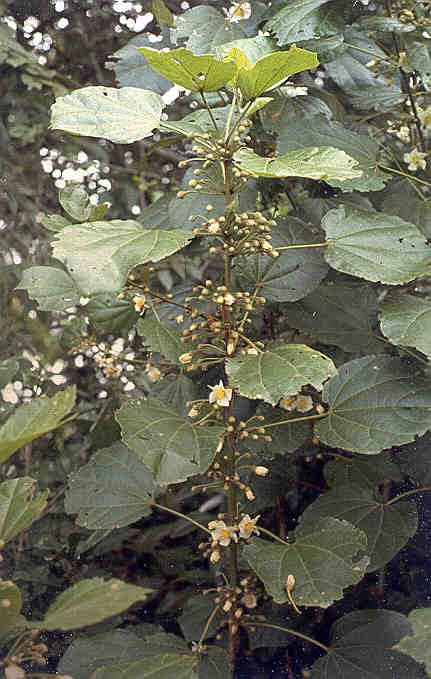
- Hampea trilobata in flower

Scientific classification
- Kingdom: Plantae
- Clade: Tracheophytes
- Clade: Angiosperms
- Clade: Eudicots
- Clade: Rosids
- Order: Malvales
- Family: Malvaceae
- Subfamily: Malvoideae
- Tribe: Gossypieae
- Genus: Hampea; Schltdl.

Species
- See text

= Hampea =

Genus of flowering plants

Hampea is a genus of flowering plants in the family Malvaceae. They are trees native to Mexico, Central America, and Colombia. There are about 21 species.

== Species ==
21 species are accepted.

- Hampea albipetala Cuatrec.
- Hampea appendiculata (Donn.Sm.) Standl.
- Hampea bracteolata Lundell
- Hampea breedlovei Fryxell
- Hampea integerrima Schltdl.
- Hampea lanceolata F.Areces
- Hampea longipes Miranda
- Hampea mexicana Fryxell
- Hampea micrantha A.Robyns
- Hampea montebellensis Fryxell
- Hampea nutricia Fryxell
- Hampea ovatifolia Lundell
- Hampea platanifolia Standl.
- Hampea punctulata Cuatrec.
- Hampea reynae Fryxell – majagua
- Hampea rovirosae Standl.
- Hampea sphaerocarpa Fryxell
- Hampea stipitata S.Watson
- Hampea thespesioides Triana & Planch.
- Hampea tomentosa (C.Presl) Standl.
- Hampea trilobata Standl.

== Ecology ==
Lepidoptera whose caterpillars feed on Hampea include Macrosoma conifera and one or two taxa of the two-barred flasher (Astraptes fulgerator) cryptic species complex.
