= Hampea thespesioides =

Conservation status
- Least Concern (IUCN 3.1)

Scientific classification
- Kingdom: Plantae
- Clade: Tracheophytes
- Clade: Angiosperms
- Clade: Eudicots
- Clade: Rosids
- Order: Malvales
- Family: Malvaceae
- Genus: Hampea
- Species: H. thespesioides

Binomial name
- Hampea thespesioides Triana & Planch.

Species of flowering plant

Hampea thespesioides is a species of flowering plant in the family Malvaceae. It is endemic to Colombia.
