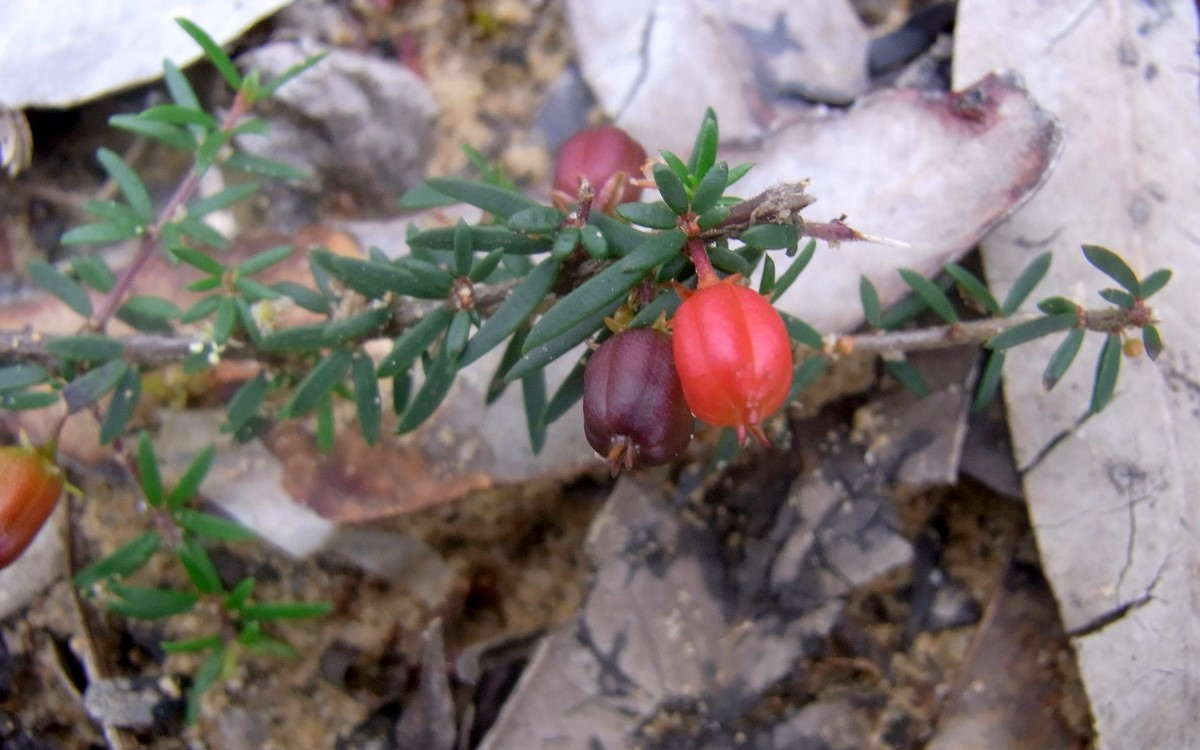
- In Ku-ring-gai Chase National Park

Scientific classification
- Kingdom: Plantae
- Clade: Tracheophytes
- Clade: Angiosperms
- Clade: Eudicots
- Clade: Rosids
- Order: Malpighiales
- Family: Picrodendraceae
- Genus: Micrantheum
- Species: M. ericoides

Binomial name
- Micrantheum ericoides Desf.

Synonyms
- Caletia ericodes Kuntze orth. var.; Caletia ericoides (Desf.) Kuntze; Micrantheum ericoides Desf. var. ericoides; Micrantheum ericoide var. genuinum Grüning nom. inval.; Micrantheum ericoides var. intermedium Grüning; Micrantheum ericoides var. juniperinum Grüning; Phyllanthus lhotzkyanus Hochst. ex Steud.

= Micrantheum ericoides =

Species of shrub

Micrantheum ericoides is a species of flowering plant in the family Picrodendraceae and is endemic to eastern Australia. It is a small, heath-like, monoecious shrub with linear to narrowly elliptic leaves, and small white or pinkish flowers arranged singly or in pairs.

== Description ==
Micrantheum ericoides is a heath-like shrub that typically grows to a height of up to 70 cm (28 in), its new growth sometimes softly-hairy. The leaves are arranged in whorls of three, linear to narrowly elliptic, 4–10 mm (0.16–0.39 in) long and 1.0–1.5 mm (0.039–0.059 in) wide. The upper surface of the leaves is smooth, the lower surface covered with soft, white hairs. Male flowers are borne on a peduncle 1–2 mm (0.039–0.079 in) long, the tepals about 1.5 mm (0.059 in) long, and there are 3 stamens. Female flowers are on a peduncle that increases to 5 mm (0.20 in) long at the fruiting stage. Flowering occurs from August to November, and the fruit is a smooth capsule 6–7 mm (0.24–0.28 in) long and about 4 mm (0.16 in) wide.

== Taxonomy ==
Micrantheum ericoides was first formally described in 1818 by René Louiche Desfontaines in Mémoires du Muséum d'histoire naturelle. The specific epithet (ericoides) means "Erica-like".

== Distribution and habitat ==
This species grows in heath and forest in sandy soil in south-eastern Queensland and eastern New South Wales.
