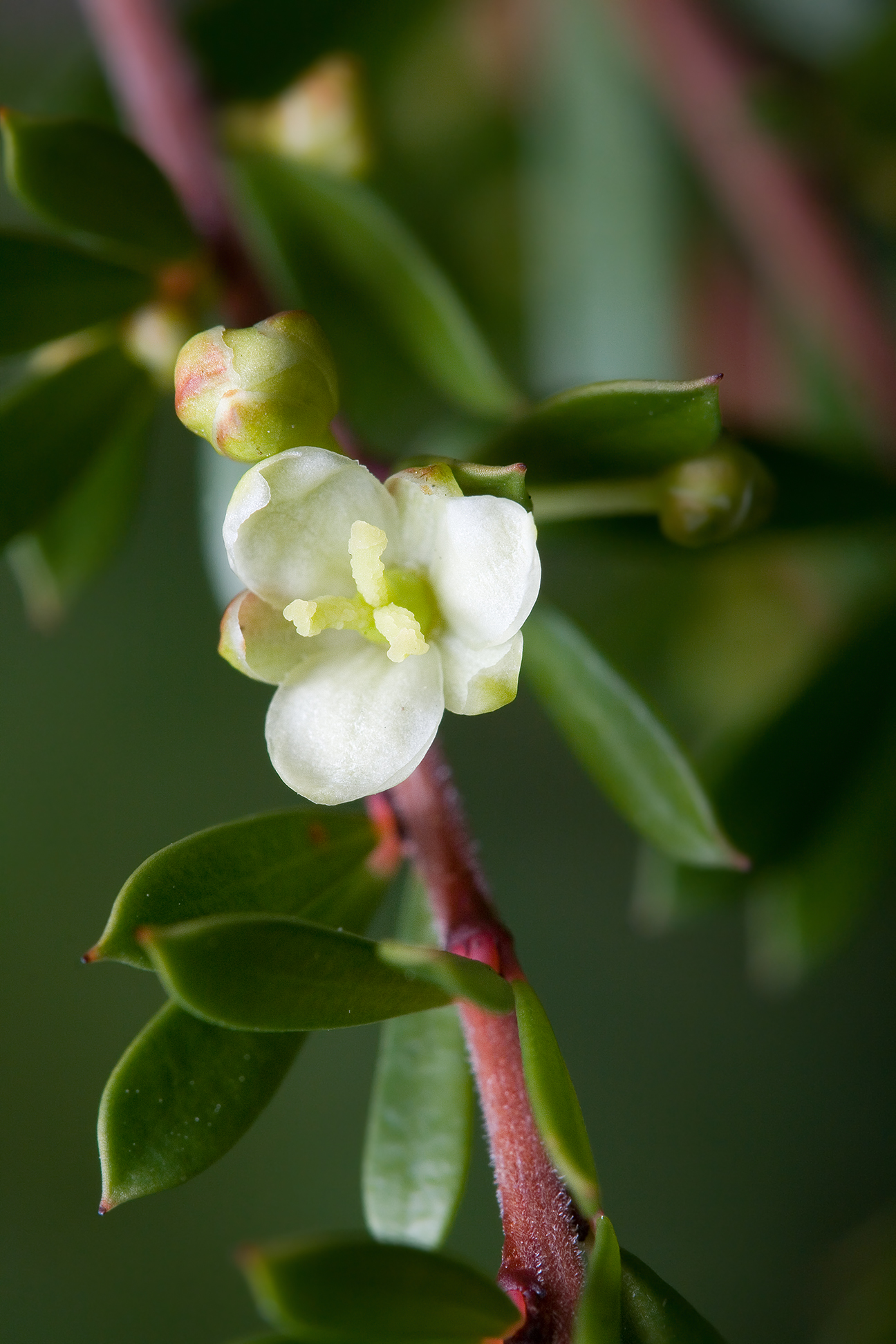
- In the Royal Tasmanian Botanical Gardens

Scientific classification
- Kingdom: Plantae
- Clade: Tracheophytes
- Clade: Angiosperms
- Clade: Eudicots
- Clade: Rosids
- Order: Malpighiales
- Family: Picrodendraceae
- Genus: Micrantheum
- Species: M. serpentinum

Binomial name
- Micrantheum serpentinum Orchard

= Micrantheum serpentinum =

Species of shrub

Micrantheum serpentinum, commonly known as western tridentbush, is a species of flowering plant in the family Picrodendraceae, and is endemic to north-western Tasmania. It is a straggly, monoecious shrub with oblong to narrowly egg-shaped leaves and yellowish to greenish flowers.

== Description ==
Micrantheum serpentinium is a straggly, monoecious shrub with many branches and that typically grows to a height of up to 2 m (6 ft 7 in). Its leaves are arranged in groups of three and are oblong to narrowly egg-shaped, 5–9 mm (0.20–0.35 in) long and 1.5–3.3 mm (0.059–0.130 in) wide. The leaves are leathery, more or less glabrous, dark glossy green on the upper surface and paler below. The flowers are arranged singly in upper leaf axils, the male flowers bove the female flowers. The tepals are less than 2.5 mm (0.098 in) long and yellowish to greenish with a red tinge. Male flowers have six stamens and female flowers three styles. Flowering occurs from September to early November and the fruit is a yellowish-black, oval capsule 3.0–3.3 mm (0.12–0.13 in) long with the remains of the styles attached.

== Taxonomy ==
Micrantheum serpentinium was first formally described in 1991 by Anthony Edward Orchard in Aspects of Tasmanian Botany - a tribute to Winifred Curtis.

== Distribution and habitat ==
Western tridentbush grows in shrubby, low, open woodland, shrubland or heath, usually on rocky hills sides in serpentinite geology, and is endemic to the Cradle Coast of north-western Tasmania.

== Conservation status ==
This species of Micrantheum is listed as "rare" under the Tasmanian Government Threatened Species Protection Act 1995. The threats to the species include inappropriate fire regimes, land clearing, infestation by Phytophthora cinnamomi, and weed invasion.
