= Hampea punctulata =

Conservation status
- Least Concern (IUCN 3.1)

Scientific classification
- Kingdom: Plantae
- Clade: Embryophytes
- Clade: Tracheophytes
- Clade: Spermatophytes
- Clade: Angiosperms
- Clade: Eudicots
- Clade: Rosids
- Order: Malvales
- Family: Malvaceae
- Genus: Hampea
- Species: H. punctulata

Binomial name
- Hampea punctulata Cuatrec.

Synonyms
- Hampea dukei A.Robyns; Hampea romeroi Cuatrec.

Species of flowering plant

Hampea punctulata is a species of flowering plant in the family Malvaceae. It a tree native to Colombia and Panama.
