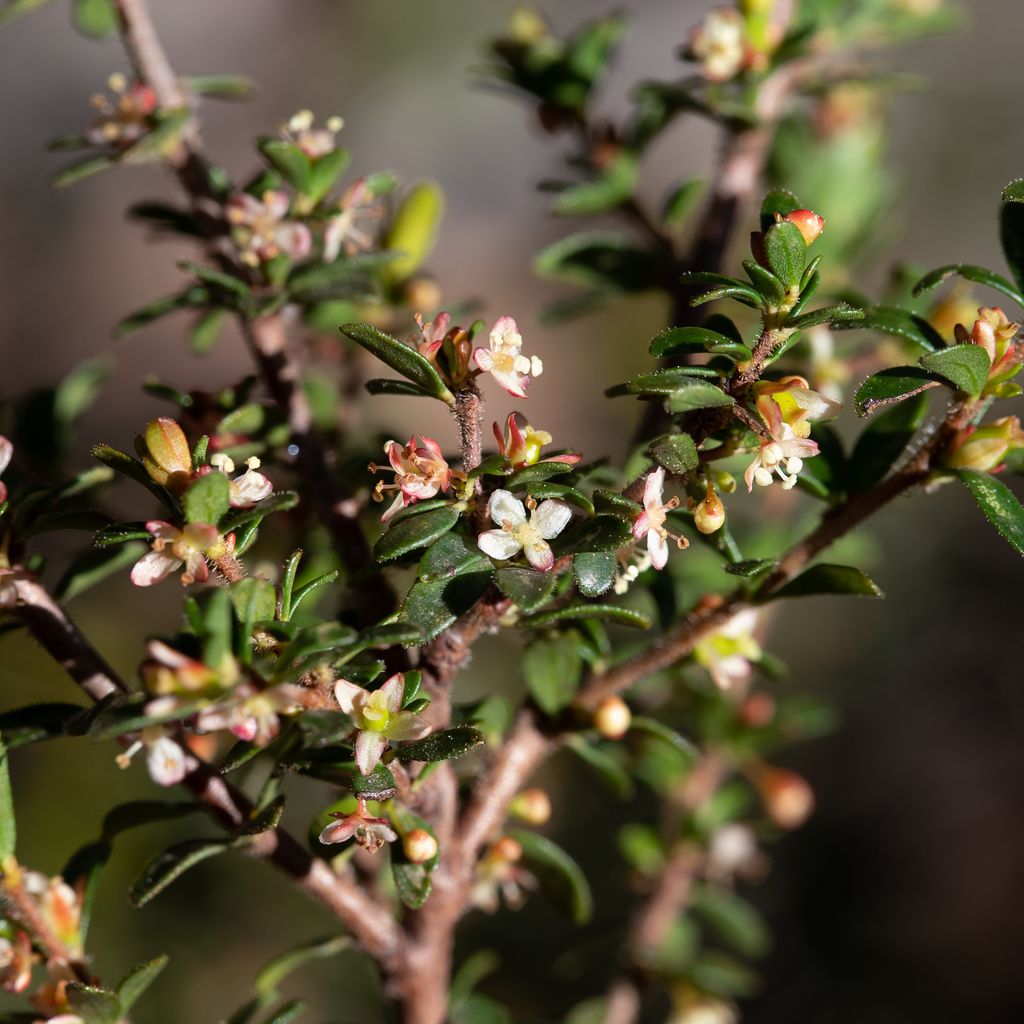
- In Cox Scrub Conservation Park

Scientific classification
- Kingdom: Plantae
- Clade: Tracheophytes
- Clade: Angiosperms
- Clade: Eudicots
- Clade: Rosids
- Order: Malpighiales
- Family: Picrodendraceae
- Genus: Micrantheum
- Species: M. demissum

Binomial name
- Micrantheum demissum F.Muell.

Synonyms
- Allenia blackiana Ewart & B.Rees nom. illeg., nom. superfl.; Allenia blackiana var. microphylla Ewart & B.Rees; Micrantheum demissum F.Muell. var. demissum; Micrantheum demissum var. microphyllum (Ewart & B.Rees) Grüning; Micrantheum demissum var. typicum Grüning nom. inval.

= Micrantheum demissum =

Species of shrub

Micrantheum demissum is a species of flowering plant in the family Picrodendraceae and is endemic to the south-east of South Australia. It is a dense, dwarf, monoecious shrub with lance-shaped to egg-shaped leaves arranged in whorls of three, and pink flowers, arranged in leaf axils in groups of up to three.

== Description ==
Micrantheum demissum is a dense, dwarf, monoecious shrub that typically grows to height of 10–30 cm (3.9–11.8 in), sometimes 50 cm (20 in) and has slender branches. The leaves are usually arranged in whorls of three, lance-shaped to egg-shaped, 3–8 mm (0.12–0.31 in) long and 1.5–3.5 mm (0.059–0.138 in) wide on a very short petiole. The upper surface of the leaves is smooth, the lower surface covered with soft, white hairs. Male flowers are arranged singly or in groups of up to three in leaf axils and are 1.5–2.5 mm (0.059–0.098 in) long on a short pedicel and have four sepals, the two outer ones egg-shaped, and the inner ones larger and more or less round, and there are usually four stamens but no petals. Female flowers are sessile, up to 3 mm (0.12 in) long and arranged singly or scattered among male flowers, the sepal lobes lance-shaped and more or less equal in size. Flowering occurs from April to October with a peak in August and September, and the fruit is an oval capsule 6–7 mm (0.24–0.28 in) long.

== Taxonomy and naming ==
Micrantheum demissum was first formally described in 1890 by Ferdinand von Mueller in The Victorian Naturalist from specimens collected by Ralph Tate and Johann Tepper The specific epithet (demissum) means "low-lying" or "drooping".

== Distribution ==
This species occurs on the Eyre Peninsula, southern Mount Lofty Ranges and Kangaroo Island regions of south-eastern South Australia.
