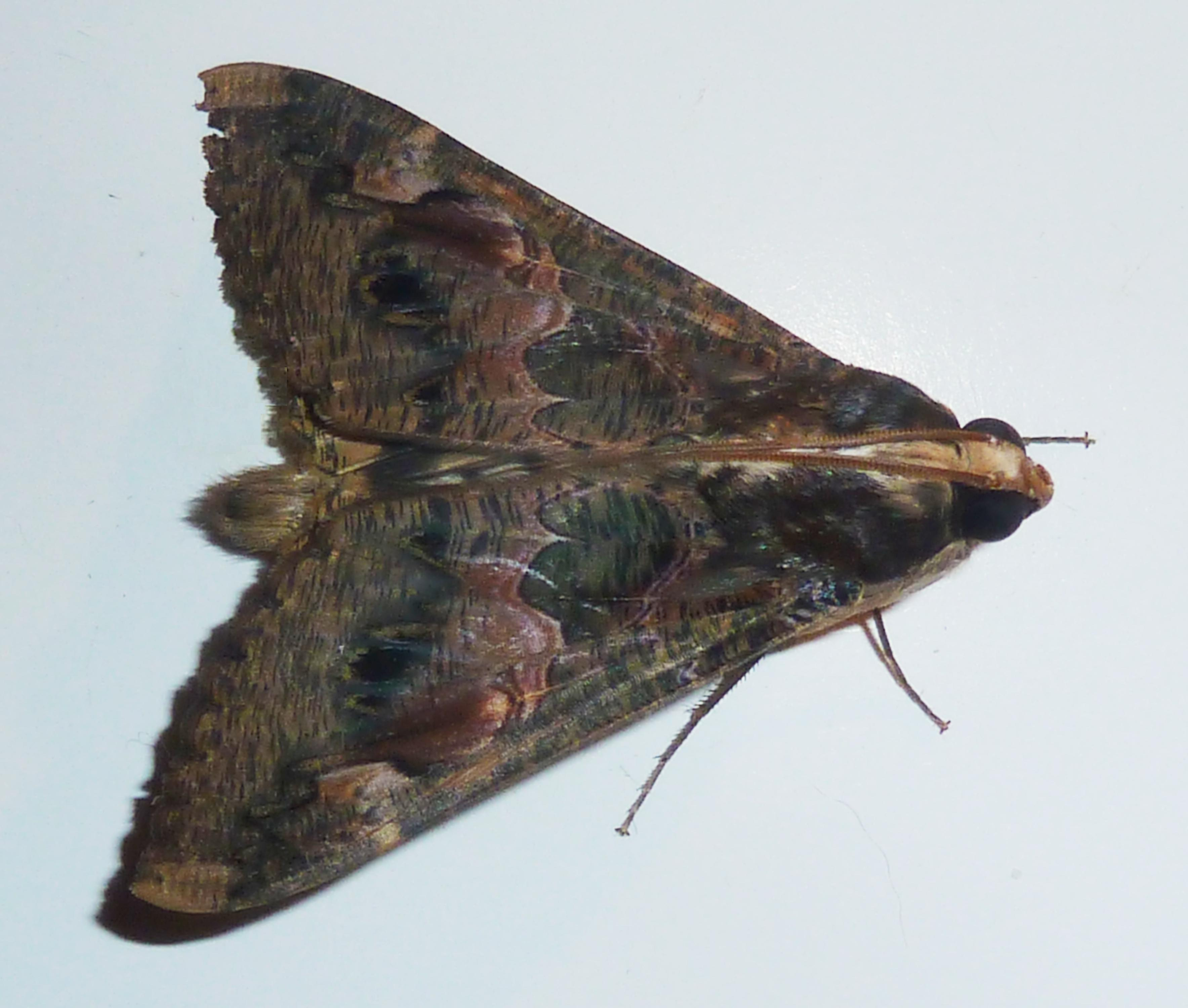
- Sphingomorpha chlorea, a fruit-sucking species, Pretoria, South Africa

Scientific classification
- Kingdom: Animalia
- Phylum: Arthropoda
- Clade: Pancrustacea
- Class: Insecta
- Order: Lepidoptera
- Superfamily: Noctuoidea
- Family: Erebidae
- Subfamily: Erebinae
- Genus: Sphingomorpha; Guenée in Boisduval & Guenée, 1852

= Sphingomorpha =

Genus of moths

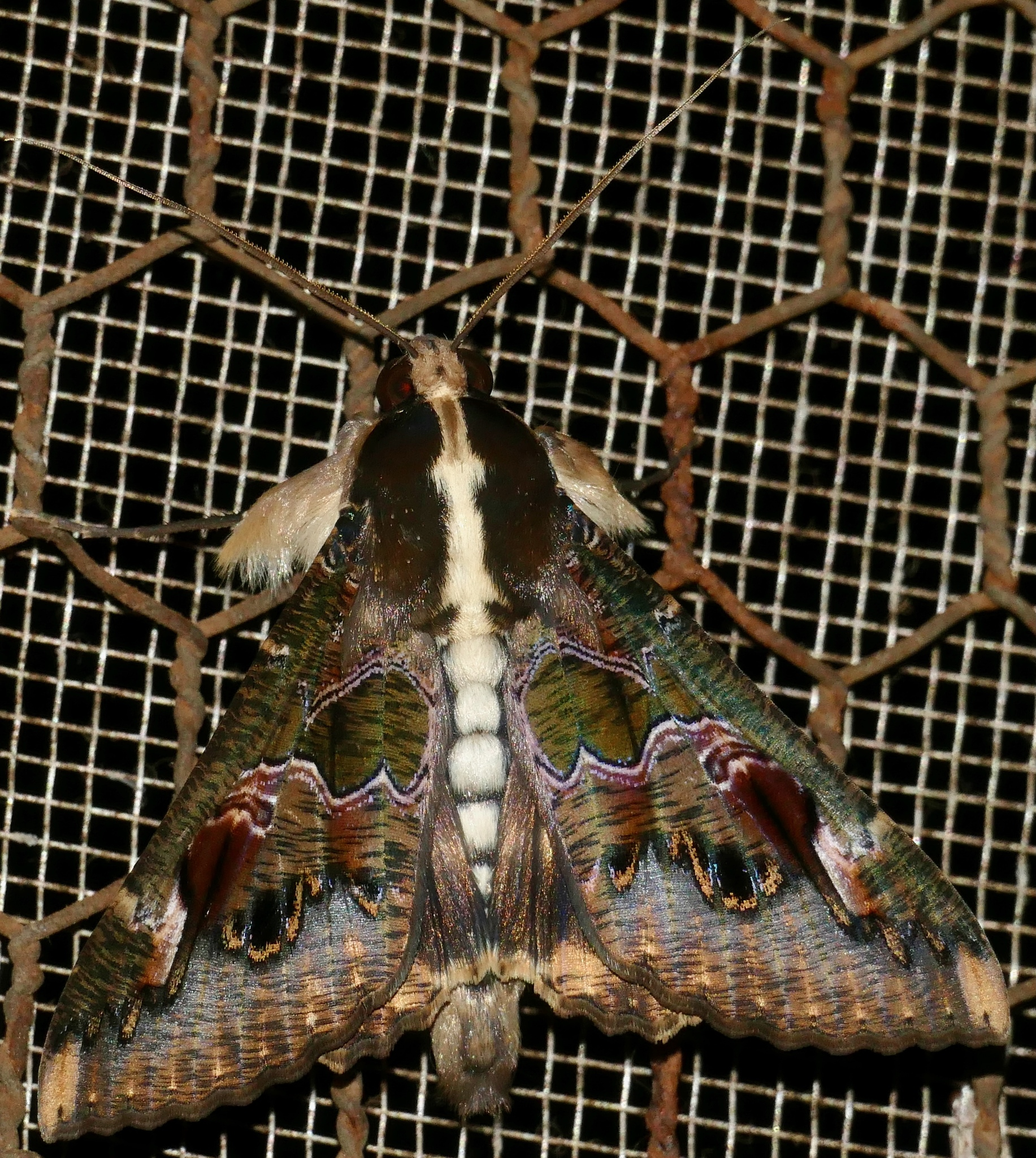
Sphingomorpha chlorea, South Africa

Sphingomorpha is a genus of moths of the family Erebidae first described by Achille Guenée in 1852. Some species, such as Sphingomorpha chlorea, are notorious pests in orchards, and are known as fruitsucking or fruit-piercing moths.

== Description ==
Palpi upturned, where the second joint reaches vertex of the head, smoothly scaled and somewhat thickened. Third joint is long and very slender. Antennae of male with slight fasciculated (bundled) cilia on the underside. Thorax and abdomen smoothly scaled. Tibia hairy. Fore tibia clothed with tufts of immensely long hair in male. Forewings long and narrow. Costa arched before the apex. Outer margin obliquely rounded, with crenulate cilia. Hindwings with outer margin excised from vein 2 to anal angle.

== Species ==
Species include:

- Sphingomorpha chlorea (Cramer, 1777) (Africa / Asia)
- Sphingomorpha hemia Guenée, 1852 (from Indonesia)
- Sphingomorpha marshalli Hampson, 1902 (from Zimbabwe)
