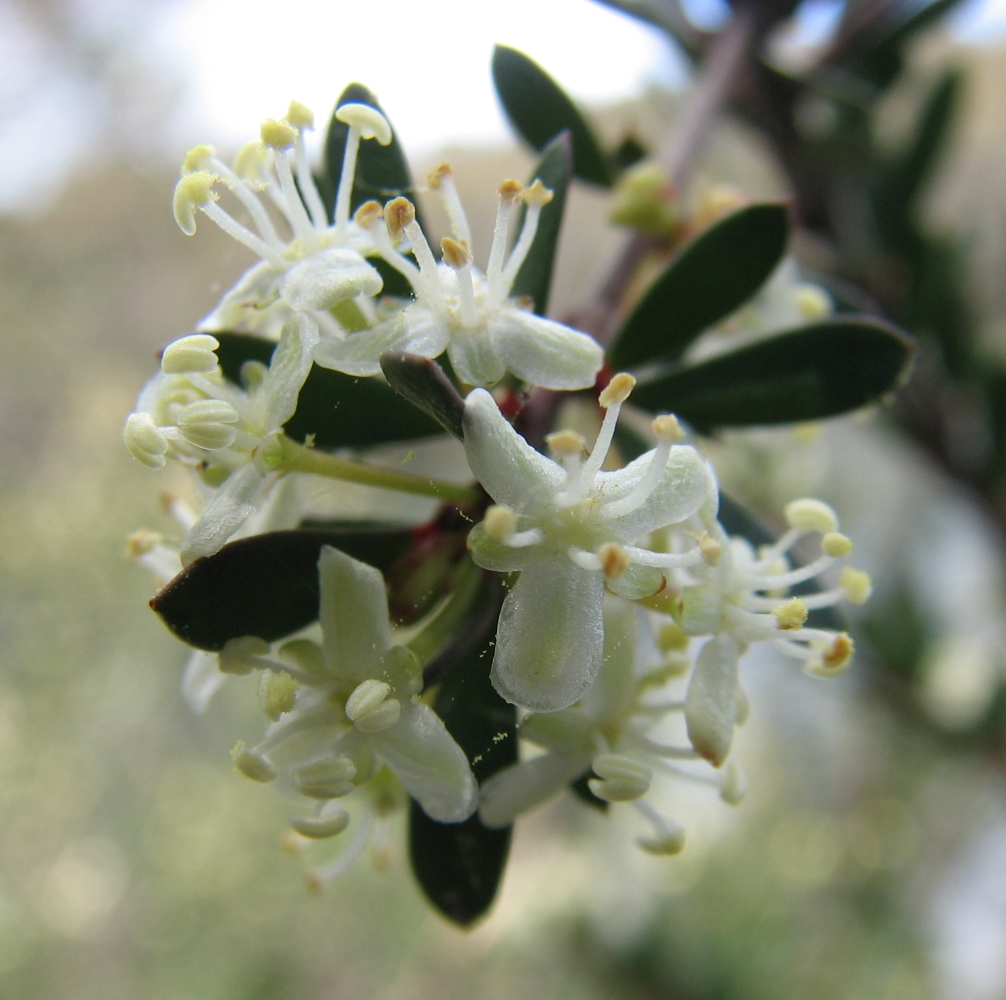
- Micrantheum hexandrum Mount Buffalo National Park, Victoria

Scientific classification
- Kingdom: Plantae
- Clade: Tracheophytes
- Clade: Angiosperms
- Clade: Eudicots
- Clade: Rosids
- Order: Malpighiales
- Family: Picrodendraceae
- Genus: Micrantheum
- Species: M. hexandrum

Binomial name
- Micrantheum hexandrum Hook.f.

Synonyms
- Caletia hexandra (Hook.f.) Müll.Arg.; Caletia micrantheoides Baill. nom. illeg., nom. superfl.; Micranthea hexandra F.Muell. orth. var.; Micranthemum hexandrum Hook.f. orth. var.; Micrantheum boroniaceum F.Muell.; Phyllanthus boroniacus Grüning nom. inval., pro syn.

= Micrantheum hexandrum =

Species of shrub

Micrantheum hexandrum, commonly known as box micrantheum, is a species of flowering plant in the family Picrodendraceae and is endemic to eastern Australia. It is an erect, monoecious shrub with oblong to narrowly lance-shaped leaves, and small white flowers with six or nine stamens.

== Description ==
Micrantheum hexandrum is an erect, monoecious, more or less glabrous shrub that typically grows to a height of about 2 m (6 ft 7 in). The leaves are oblong to narrowly lance-shaped or lance-shaped, with the narrower end towards the base, 8–15 mm (0.31–0.59 in) long and 2–3 mm (0.079–0.118 in) wide with a small point on the tip. Male flowers are borne on a peduncle about 8 mm (0.31 in) long, the sepals egg-shaped and 1–3 mm (0.039–0.118 in) long, and have six or nine stamens. Female flowers are more or less sessile, the sepals lance-shaped to egg-shaped and 3–5 mm (0.12–0.20 in) long. Flowering mostly occurs from October to February, and the fruit is an oval to spherical capsule 6–7 mm (0.24–0.28 in) long.

== Taxonomy ==
Micrantheum hexandrum was first formally described in 1847 by Joseph Dalton Hooker in the London Journal of Botany from specimens collected near Launceston. The specific epithet (hexandrum) means "six stamens".

== Distribution and habitat ==
Box micrantheum grows on rocky sites and near watercourses, often at higher altitudes, from south-eastern Queensland, along the coast and tablelands of New South Wales to scattered places in eastern Victoria and to eastern Tasmania.
