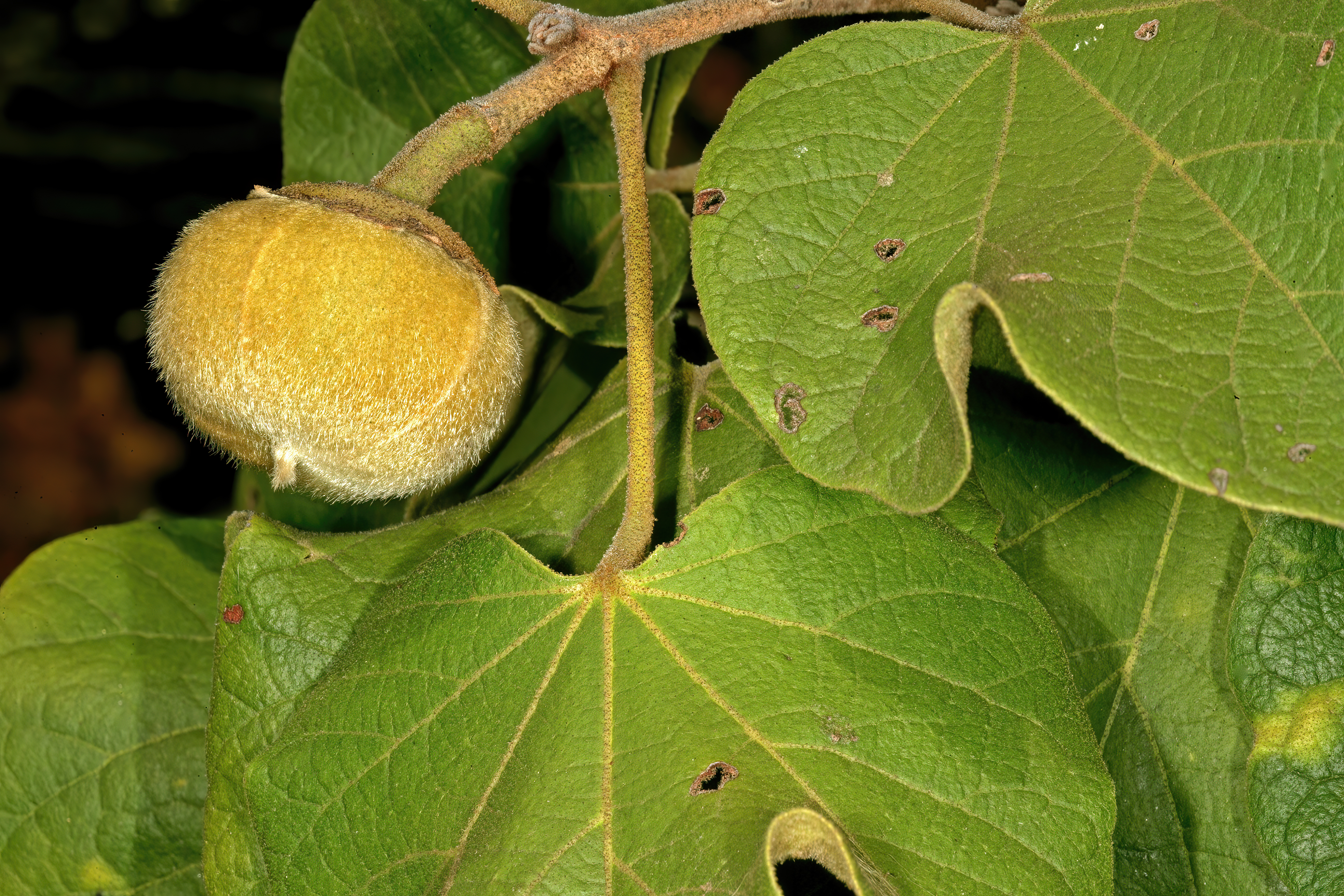

Scientific classification
- Kingdom: Plantae
- Clade: Tracheophytes
- Clade: Angiosperms
- Clade: Eudicots
- Clade: Rosids
- Order: Malvales
- Family: Malvaceae
- Genus: Thespesia
- Species: T. garckeana

Binomial name
- Thespesia garckeana F.Hoffm.(Exell & Hillc.)

= Thespesia garckeana =

Species of tree

Thespesia garckeana /ˌθɛsˈpiːʒə ˌɡɑːrkiˈænə, -ˈɑːnə/ (also known by its synonym Azanza garckeana) is a tree in the family Malvaceae, found throughout the warmer parts of Southern Africa in wooded grasslands, open woodland and thickets. It grows naturally over a range of altitudes from 1,000 to 2,000 m above sea level, from semi-arid areas to areas of higher rainfall. T. garckeana is often found on or near termite mounds in old fields.

Common names: African chewing gum, goron tula, snot apple, tree hibiscus, mutohwe (Shona), nkole (Sri Lanka), uXakuxaku (isiNdebele) and morojwa (Setswana).

== Benefits of African chewing gum leaves ==
1. nutrients present in the fruit help cleanse the body system and prevent diseases like cancer, diabetes, high blood pressure, and fertility challenges.
2. it serves as an aphrodisiac and aids against liver problems, and mental illness among other diseases.
3. it assists in improving bowel movement, eases digestion and improves the body's immune system. Most importantly, it is safe for consumption across all ages.

== Uses ==
- The whole fruit except the seeds is chewed like gum, producing a sweet glutinous slime. The fruit is also used as a syrup and soup.
- The sap wood is yellow and the heart wood is a deep brown. It is easily worked but generally only suitable for small building needs, tool handles, oxen yokes, and domestic items such as spoons.
- The leaves of T. garckeana have many uses including green manure and mulch. The leaves also provide an often used fodder.

== Flavour ==
The flavour is similar in taste to the mango fruit. The taste is quite different to a mango, it has a sweet scent, the darker the tinge, as well as the droplets of sap that cover the outside, glistening in the sun. It is a hard shell fruit, each segment of the fruit when consumed breaks down the compounds and creates a sticky, almost gelatinous texture and finally into a pulp, thats sucked of all its nutrients and is not digested. Like with any other fruits, when it is not ripe, you can tell by the green tinge, and the taste is more bitter in the fibre though sweet overall.

== See also ==
- List of Southern African indigenous trees
