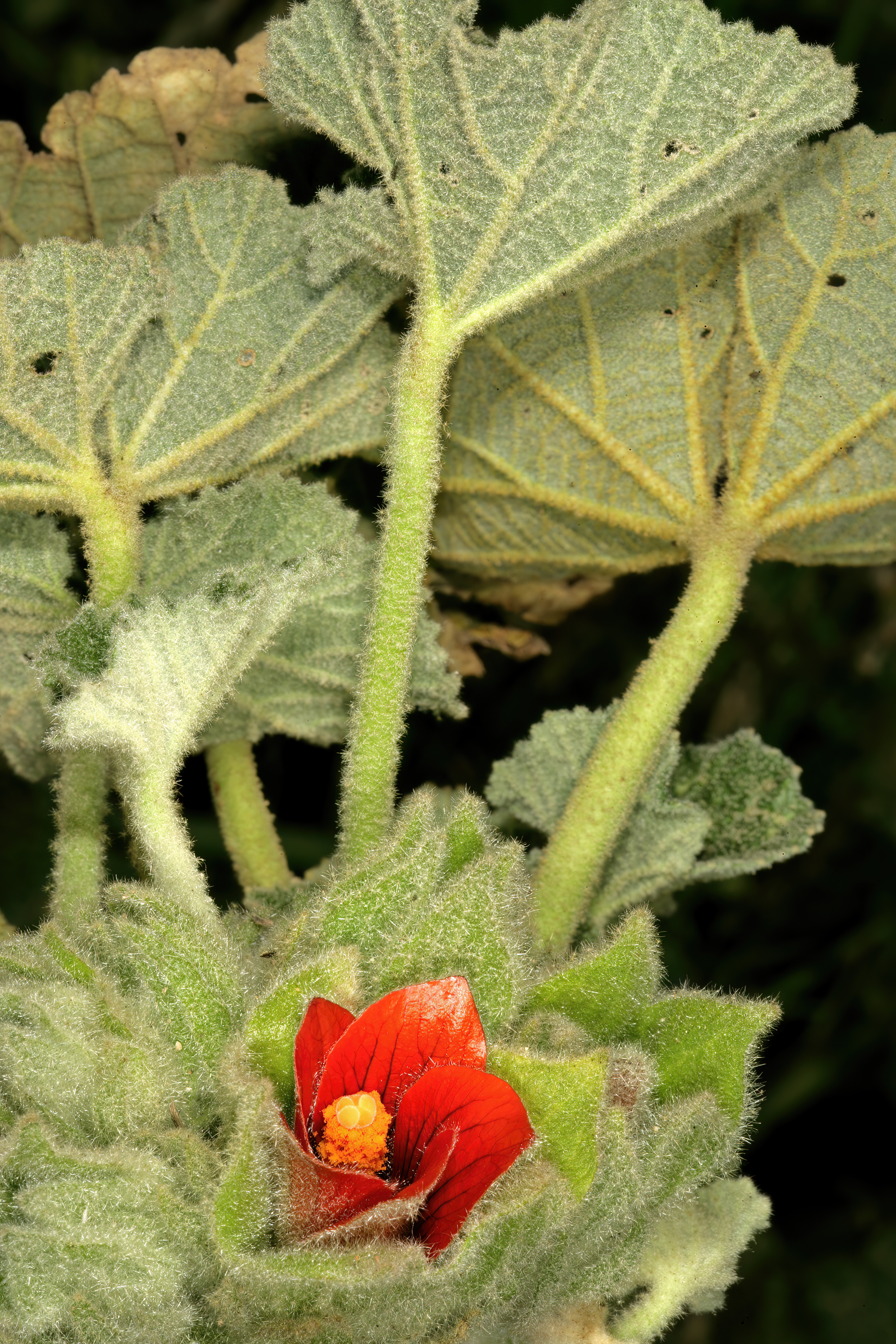
- Radyera urens

Scientific classification
- Kingdom: Plantae
- Clade: Tracheophytes
- Clade: Angiosperms
- Clade: Eudicots
- Clade: Rosids
- Order: Malvales
- Family: Malvaceae
- Subfamily: Malvoideae
- Tribe: Hibisceae
- Genus: Radyera; Bullock

Species
- See text

Synonyms
- Allenia E.Phillips

= Radyera =

Genus of flowering plants

Radyera is a genus of flowering plants in the family Malvaceae.

Species include:

- Radyera farragei (F.Muell.) Fryxell & S.H.Hashmi - Desert Rose Mallow, Bush Hibiscus
- Radyera urens (L.f.) Bullock

The genus was first formally described by A.A. Bullock in the Kew Bulletin in 1957.
