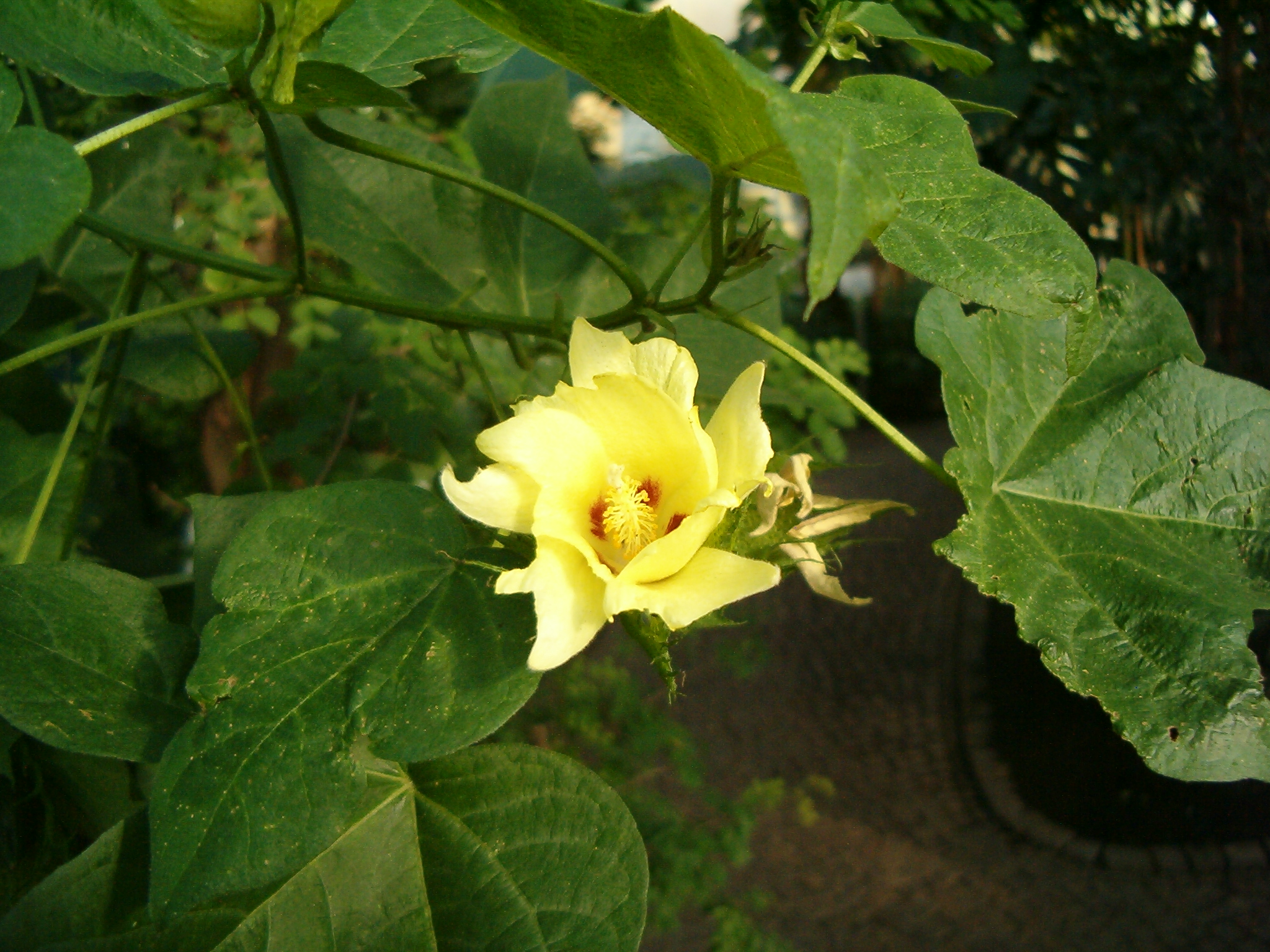
- Mexican cotton (Gossypium hirsutum)

Scientific classification
- Kingdom: Plantae
- Clade: Tracheophytes
- Clade: Angiosperms
- Clade: Eudicots
- Clade: Rosids
- Order: Malvales
- Family: Malvaceae
- Subfamily: Malvoideae
- Tribe: Gossypieae

Genera
- See text

= Gossypieae =

Tribe of flowering plants

Gossypieae is a tribe of the flowering plant subfamily Malvoideae. It includes the cotton (Gossypium) and related plants. It is distinguished from the Hibisceae on the basis of embryo structure and its apparently unique possession of glands able to synthesize the pigment gossypol.

== Genera ==
The following genera are recognised. The Germplasm Resources Information Network (GRIN) differs in additionally including the genus Alyogyne and excluding the genus Thepparatia.

- Cephalohibiscus Ulbr.
- Cienfuegosia Cav.
- Gossypioides Skovst. ex J.B.Hutch.
- Gossypium L.
- Hampea Schltdl.
- Kokia Lewton
- Lebronnecia Fosberg
- Thepparatia Phuph.
- Thespesia Sol. ex Corrêa
