= Thepparatia =

Scientific classification
- Kingdom: Plantae
- Clade: Tracheophytes
- Clade: Angiosperms
- Clade: Eudicots
- Clade: Rosids
- Order: Malvales
- Family: Malvaceae
- Genus: Thepparatia; Phuph.
- Species: T. scandens

Binomial name
- Thepparatia scandens (Roxb. ex G.Don) Phuph.

Synonyms
- Hibiscus scandens Roxb. ex G.Don; Thepparatia thailandica Phuph.

Species of flowering plants

Thepparatia is a monotypic genus of flowering plants belonging to the family Malvaceae. It only contains one known species, the liana Thepparatia scandens.

Its native range is from the Indian subcontinent to parts of Indo-China. It is found in the Andaman Islands, Assam, Bangladesh, eastern Himalaya, India, Myanmar and Thailand.

The genus name of Thepparatia is in honour of Sirindhorn (b. 1955), Thailand princess. (Thais commonly refer to her as "Phra Thep", meaning "princess angel"). The Latin specific epithet of scandens means climbing, as derived from scando. The genus was first described and published in Thai Forest Bull., Bot. Vol.34 on page 195 in 2006. The species was published in Fl. Thailand Vol.14 (Issue 2) on page 329 in 2019.
