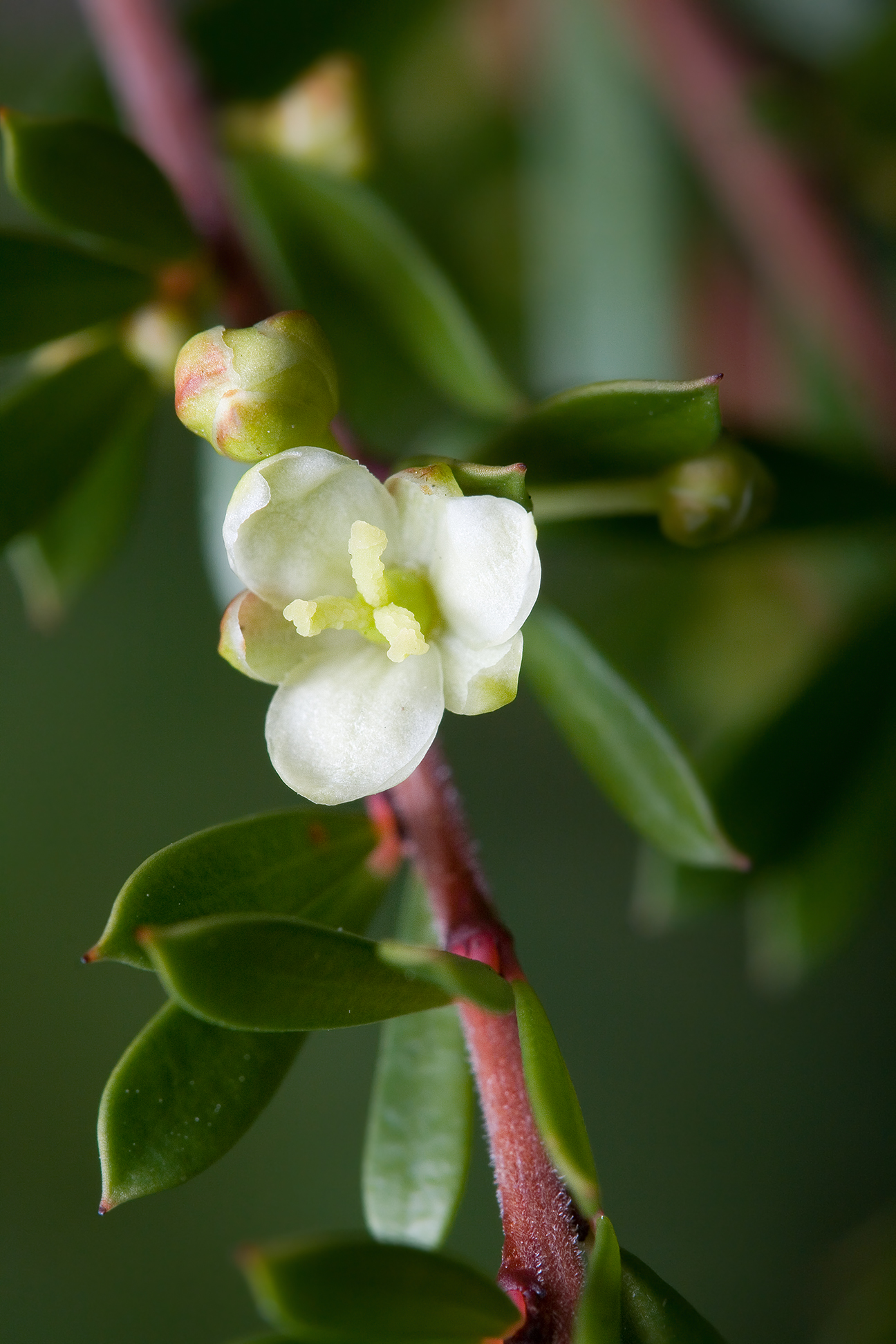
- Micrantheum serpentinum

Scientific classification
- Kingdom: Plantae
- Clade: Tracheophytes
- Clade: Angiosperms
- Clade: Eudicots
- Clade: Rosids
- Order: Malpighiales
- Family: Picrodendraceae
- Tribe: Caletieae
- Subtribe: Pseudanthinae
- Genus: Micrantheum; Desf.

Synonyms
- List: Allenia Ewart; Caletia Baill. p.p.; Caletia Baill. sect. Caletia; Caletia sect. Eucaletia Müll.Arg. nom. inval.; Caletia sect. Micrantheum (Desf.) Kuntze; Micranthea F.Muell. orth. var.; Micranthemum Hook.f. orth. var.; Micrantheum subg. Allenia (Ewart) Pax & K.Hoffm. nom. illeg.; Micrantheum subg. Allenium Grüning; Micrantheum subg. Eucaletia Grüning; Micrantheum subg. Eumicrantheum Grüning nom. inval.; Micrantheum Desf. subg. Micrantheum

= Micrantheum =

Genus of flowering plants

Micrantheum is a genus of four species of flowering plant in the family Picrodendraceae and is endemic to Australia. Plants in the genus Micrantheum are heath-like, monoecious shrubs with simple leaves usually in groups of three, and flowers arranged singly or in small clusters in leaf axils, male flowers with three, six or nine stamens.

== Description ==
Plants in the genus Micrantheum are heath-like, monoecious shrubs with many branches, the leaves usually arranged in groups of three, sometimes in groups of two, four or five. The leaves are simple and leathery, the groups of leaves arranged alternately along the branches on a short petiole with tiny stipules at the base. The flowers are arranged singly or in small groups in leaf axils with bracts at the base and four or six sepal lobes, the petals often absent. Male flowers are on a short peduncle and have three, six or nine stamens. Female flowers have an ovary with two or three cells with two ovules per cell, and two or three styles. The fruit is a capsule containing seeds with a caruncle.

== Taxonomy ==
The genus Micrantheum was first formally described in 1818 by René Louiche Desfontaines in Mémoires du Muséum d'histoire naturelle, and the first species he described (the type species) was Micrantheum ericoides.

=== Species list ===
The following is a list of species of Micrantheum, accepted by the Australian Plant Census as of September 2023:

- Micrantheum demissum F.Muell. – South Australia
- Micrantheum ericoides Desf. – New South Wales, Queensland
- Micrantheum hexandrum Hook.f. – box micrantheum – New South Wales, Queensland, Victoria, Tasmania
- Micrantheum serpentinum Orchard – western tridentbush – Tasmania

== See also ==
- Taxonomy of the Picrodendraceae
