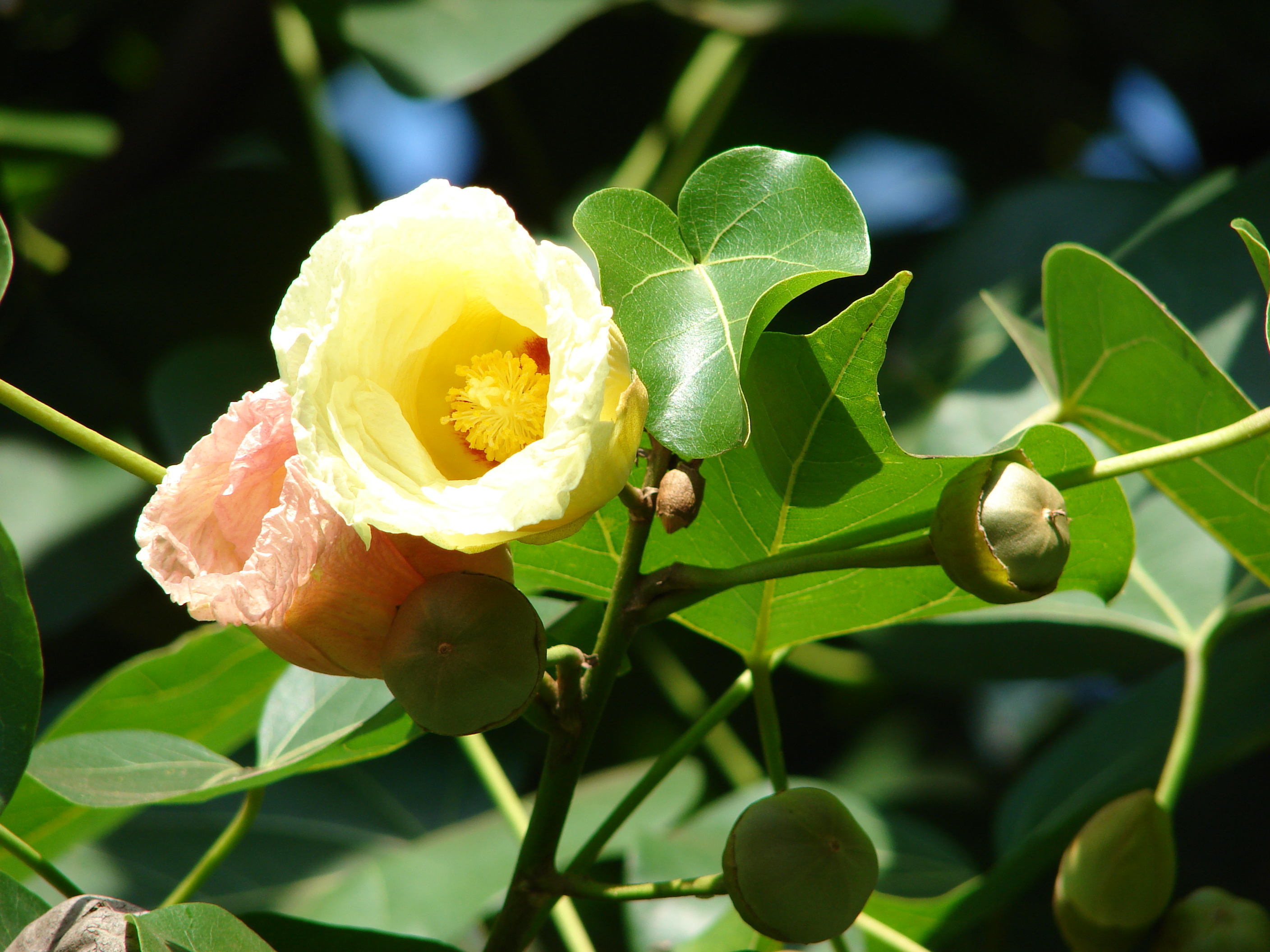
- Thespesia populnea

Scientific classification
- Kingdom: Plantae
- Clade: Tracheophytes
- Clade: Angiosperms
- Clade: Eudicots
- Clade: Rosids
- Order: Malvales
- Family: Malvaceae
- Subfamily: Malvoideae
- Tribe: Gossypieae
- Genus: Thespesia; Sol. ex Corrêa (1807), nom. cons.

Species
- 14 species, see text

Synonyms
- Armouria Lewton (1933); Atkinsia R.A.Howard (1949); Bupariti Duhamel (1760); Maga Urb. (1912); Montezuma DC. (1824); Parita Scop. (1777); Pariti Adans. (1763), nom. superfl.; Paritium A.Juss. (1828), orth. var.; Shantzia Lewton (1928); Thespesiopsis Exell & Hillc. (1954); Ulbrichia Urb. (1924)

= Thespesia =

Family of shrubs and trees

Thespesia is a genus of 14 flowering shrubs and trees in the Hibiscus family, Malvaceae, although within the family they are more closely related to cotton plants (Gossypium). The genus is distributed from the South Pacific through Asia, Africa, and the Caribbean.

== Species ==
14 species are currently accepted.

- Thespesia acutiloba (Baker f.) Exell & Mendonça – Mozambique and KwaZulu Natal
- Thespesia beatensis (Urb.) Fryxell – Beata Island, Dominican Republic
- Thespesia cubensis (Britton & P.Wilson) J.B.Hutch. – Cuba
- Thespesia danis Oliv. – eastern and southern Ethiopia, Somalia, Kenya, and eastern Tanzania
- Thespesia fissicalyx Borss.Waalk. – eastern and northeastern New Guinea
- Thespesia garckeana F.Hoffm. – Nigeria to Sudan and northern South Africa
- Thespesia grandiflora DC. - Maga – Puerto Rico
- Thespesia gummiflua Capuron – northern Madagascar
- Thespesia mossambicensis (Exell & Hillc.) Fryxell – northeastern Mozambique
- Thespesia multibracteata Borss.Waalk. – New Guinea
- Thespesia patellifera Borss.Waalk. – eastern New Guinea
- Thespesia populnea (L.) Sol. ex Corrêa - Portia tree – Pantropical
- Thespesia populneoides (Roxb.) Kostel. – eastern coastal Africa, Madagascar, Indian subcontinent, Indochina, Philippines, Java, New Guinea, and northern Australia
- Thespesia robusta Borss.Waalk. – southeastern Papua New Guinea
