= Friedrich Alefeld =

German botanist, author, and medical practitioner (1820-1872)

Friedrich Georg Christoph Alefeld (21 October 1820 – 28 April 1872) was a botanist, writer, and medical practitioner. Born in Weiterstadt-Gräfenhausen, Grand Duchy of Hesse; he described a number of plant species in his published works, taking a particular interest in legumes and Malvaceae. He attempted to give a systematic treatment of German crops in one work, in addition to writing treatises on herbal baths and cultivated plants of potential usefulness. A number of his essays appeared in the botanical literature of the day.

His works include:

- Articles in Oesterreichische Botanische Zeitschrift (Oesterr. Bot. Z.) The Austrian Botanical Magazine.
- Landwirthschaftliche flora: oder Die nutzbaren kultivirten Garten- und Feldgewächse Mitteleuropa's in allen ihren wilden und Kulturvarietäten für Landwirthe, Gärtner, Gartenfreunde und Botaniker insbesondere für landwirthschaftliche Lehranstalten. Berlin, Wiegandt & Hempel, 1866.
- Grundzüge der Phytobalneologie; oder, Der Lehre von den Kräuter-Bädern. Neuwied, Heuser, 1863. ("Outline of phytobalneology or the theory of herbal baths").
- Die Bienen-Flora Deutschlands und der Schweiz. Neuwied, Heuser, 1863. ("The bee-flora in Germany and Switzerland"); A work that describes the plants of the region that are pollinated by honey bees.

IPNI gives over 300 plants names with Alefeld as the author of the accepted descriptions. Many of these remain current.

He died at Ober-Ramstadt.
