= Paul Fryxell =

American botanist (1927–2011)

- Born: February 2, 1927; Moline, Illinois
- Died: July 11, 2011 (aged 84); Claremont, California

Paul Arnold Fryxell was an American botanist known for his work on flowering plants, especially those within the Malvaceae.

== Education and career ==
Fryxell attended Moline public schools and later Augustana College, graduating with a B.A. in 1949, and Iowa State University (M.S., 1951, Ph.D., 1955). After employment with the New Mexico Agricultural Experiment Station (1952–1955) and Wichita State University (Asst. Professor of Botany, 1955–1957), he joined the Agricultural Research Service, USDA, with which agency he spent most of his career as a Research Botanist, located on the Texas A&M University campus. He retired from this position in 1994 and became an adjunct professor in Integrative Biology at the University of Texas at Austin. He was also an Honorary Curator at the New York Botanical Garden.

== Research ==
His research interests have centered on the taxonomy of the Neotropical Malvaceae, including work on the evolution, biodiversity, and taxonomy of Gossypium, the genus that includes the world's cotton crop. He served as president of the American Society of Plant Taxonomists (1983–1984) and of the Society for Economic Botany (1988–1989), and held a Fulbright Scholar Award for study in Argentina (1993). In 1961 he was elected a fellow of the American Association for the Advancement of Science. He was also a fellow of the Texas Academy of Science and a member of the Commission of Flora Neotropica.

He was a contributor to treatments of the Malvaceae to numerous Neotropical floristic works and conducted fieldwork in the neotropics, primarily in Mexico but also in parts of Central and South America, as well as in tropical Australia.

In 1974, he was honored by botanist David Martin Bates, (1934-2019), who named a monotypic genus of plants after him, Fryxellia (belonging to the family Malvaceae), which comes from Mexico and Texas.

== Personal life ==
His wife Greta (Albrecht) Fryxell was an oceanographer known for her research on diatoms.

== Selected publications ==
- Fryxell, Paul A. (1979). The natural history of the cotton tribe (Malvaceae, tribe Gossypieae) (1st ed.). College Station: Texas A & M University Press. ISBN 0-89096-071-2. OCLC 5126570.
- Fryxell, Paul A. (1988). Malvaceae of Mexico. [Ann Arbor, Mich.?]: American Society of Plant Taxonomists. ISBN 0-912861-25-8. OCLC 19036251.
- Fryxell, Paul A. (1997). "The American Genera of Malvaceae-II". Brittonia. 49 (2): 204–269. Bibcode:1997Britt..49..204F. doi:10.2307/2807683. JSTOR 2807683. S2CID 45480529.
- Fryxell, Paul A. (1999). Pavonia Cavanilles (Malvaceae). Organization for Flora Neotropica, New York Botanical Garden. Bronx, N.Y.: Published for the Organization for Flora Neotropica by the New York Botanical Garden Press. ISBN 0-89327-424-0. OCLC 41646379.

== See also ==
- Zanoni, Thomas A. (1997). "The herbarium of Paul A. Fryxell (pf) and U.S. Department of Agriculture, College Station, Texas, integrated into The New York Botanical Garden Herbarium (NY)". Brittonia. 49 (2): 197–203. Bibcode:1997Britt..49..197Z. doi:10.1007/BF02815393. ISSN 0007-196X. S2CID 45719549.
