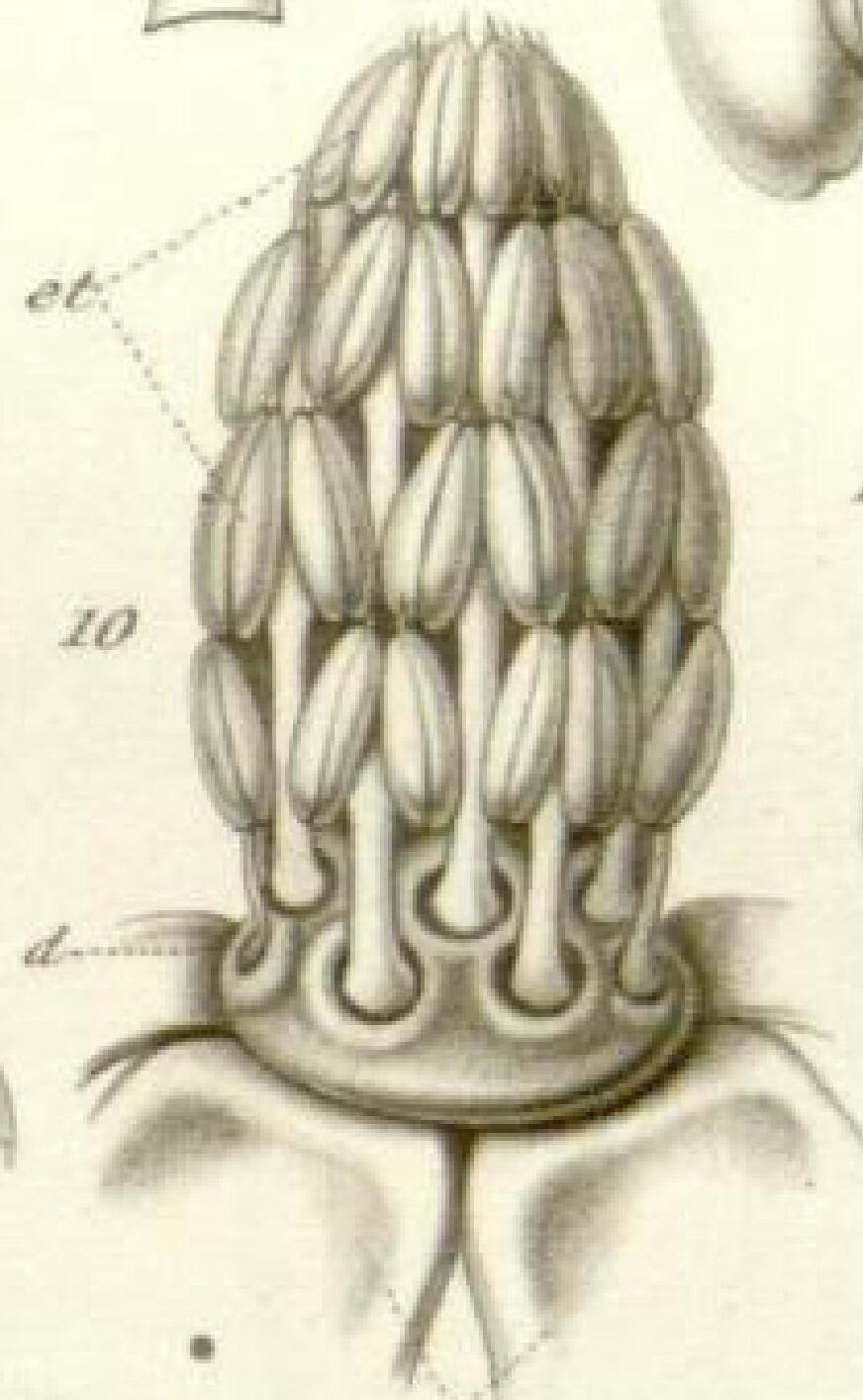
- Male flower of Acidoton urens

Scientific classification
- Kingdom: Plantae
- Clade: Tracheophytes
- Clade: Angiosperms
- Clade: Eudicots
- Clade: Rosids
- Order: Malpighiales
- Family: Euphorbiaceae
- Subfamily: Acalyphoideae
- Tribe: Plukenetieae
- Subtribe: Tragiinae
- Genus: Acidoton; Sw. 1788, conserved name, not P. Browne 1756

Type species
- Acidoton urens Sw.

Synonyms
- Durandeeldia Kuntze; Gitara Pax & K.Hoffm.

= Acidoton =

Genus of flowering plants

Acidoton is a genus of plant of the family Euphorbiaceae first described as a genus in 1788. It is native to the Greater Antilles, Central America, and tropical South America.

Species

1. Acidoton haitiensis Alain - Haiti
2. Acidoton lanceolatus Urb. & Ekman - Haiti
3. Acidoton microphyllus Urb. - Hispaniola
4. Acidoton nicaraguensis (Hemsl.) G.L.Webster - Central America, Colombia, Ecuador, Peru, Bolivia, NW Brazil
5. Acidoton urens Sw. - Jamaica
6. Acidoton variifolius Urb. & Ekman - Hispaniola

Formerly included

moved to other genera (Flueggea Jablonskia Margaritaria Meineckia Securinega )

1. A. acidothamnus - Flueggea acidoton
2. A. baillonianus - Margaritaria discoidea var. triplosphaera
3. A. buxifolius - Flueggea tinctoria
4. A. congestus - Jablonskia congesta
5. A. durissimus - Securinega durissima
6. A. ellipticus - Flueggea elliptica
7. A. flexuosus - Flueggea flexuosa
8. A. flueggeoides - Flueggea suffruticosa
9. A. griseus - Flueggea virosa
10. A. hilarianus - Meineckia neogranatensis subsp. hilariana
11. A. leucopyrus - Flueggea leucopyrus
12. A. obovatus - Flueggea virosa
13. A. phyllanthoides - Flueggea virosa
14. A. ramiflorus - Flueggea suffruticosa
15. A. schuechianus - Flueggea schuechiana
16. A. trichogynus - Meineckia trichogynis
17. A. virosus - Flueggea virosa
