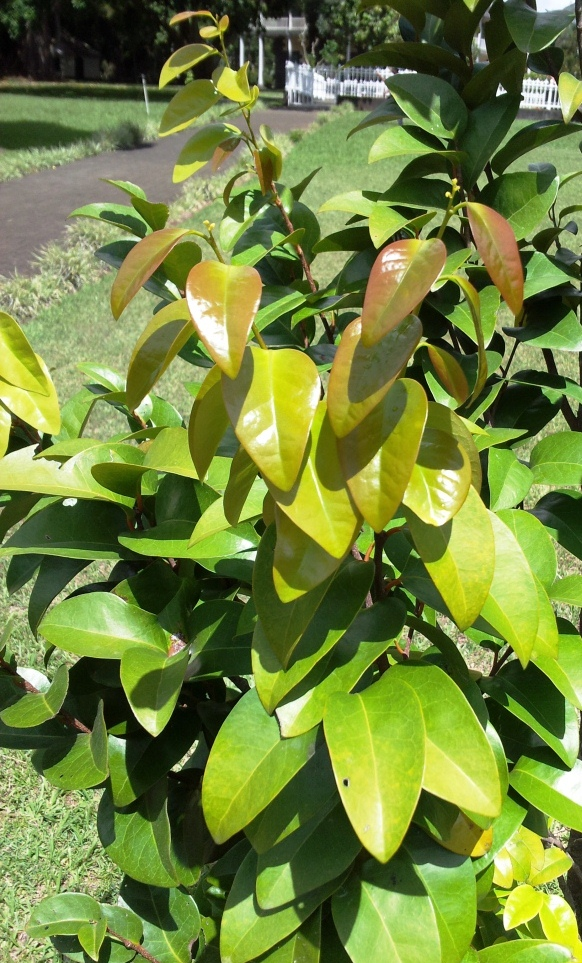
- Securinega durissima

Scientific classification
- Kingdom: Plantae
- Clade: Tracheophytes
- Clade: Angiosperms
- Clade: Eudicots
- Clade: Rosids
- Order: Malpighiales
- Family: Phyllanthaceae
- Subfamily: Phyllanthoideae
- Tribe: Bridelieae
- Subtribe: Securineginae
- Genus: Securinega; Comm. ex A.Juss.

Type species
- Securinega durissima J.F.Gmel.

= Securinega =

Genus of flowering plants

Securinega is a genus of plants in the family Phyllanthaceae, first described as a genus in 1789. As presently conceived, the genus is native to Madagascar and the Mascarene Islands in the Indian Ocean. In the past, it was considered to be much more widespread, thus explaining the long list of species formerly included. It is dioecious, with male and female flowers on separate plants.

Species

1. Securinega antsingyensis Leandri - W Madagascar
2. Securinega capuronii Leandri - W Madagascar
3. Securinega durissima J.F.Gmel. - Madagascar, Mauritius, Réunion, Rodrigues Island
4. Securinega perrieri Leandri - W Madagascar
5. Securinega seyrigii Leandri - W Madagascar

Formerly included

moved to other genera: (Actephila Andrachne Chascotheca Cleistanthus Flueggea Jablonskia Margaritaria Meineckia Neoroepera Savia Tetracoccus )

1. S. abeggii - Andrachne brittonii
2. S. abyssinica - Flueggea virosa
3. S. acicularis - Flueggea acicularis
4. S. acidothamnus - Flueggea acidoton
5. S. acidoton - Flueggea acidoton
6. S. acuminatissima - Flueggea flexuosa
7. S. bailloniana - Margaritaria discoidea var. triplosphaera
8. S. buxifolia - Flueggea tinctoria
9. S. capensis - Tetracoccus capensis
10. S. congesta - Jablonskia congesta
11. S. elliptica - Flueggea elliptica
12. S. fasciculata - Tetracoccus fasciculatus
13. S. flexuosa - Flueggea flexuosa
14. S. fluggeoides - Flueggea suffruticosa
15. S. grisea - Flueggea virosa
16. S. guaraiuva - Savia dictyocarpa
17. S. hallii - Tetracoccus fasciculatus var. hallii
18. S. hilariana - Meineckia neogranatensis subsp. hilariana
19. S. hysterantha - Margaritaria anomala
20. S. japonica - Flueggea suffruticosa
21. S. keyensis - Flueggea virosa subsp. melanthesoides
22. S. leucopyrus (Willd.) Müll.Arg. 1866 - Flueggea leucopyrus
23. S. leucopyrus Brandis 1874 - Flueggea virosa
24. S. melanthesoides - Flueggea virosa
25. S. melanthesoides var. aridicola - Flueggea virosa subsp. melanthesoides
26. S. microcarpa - Flueggea virosa
27. S. muelleriana - Neoroepera buxifolia
28. S. multiflora - Flueggea suffruticosa
29. S. neopeltandra - Chascotheca neopeltandra
30. S. nitida W.T.Aiton 1813 not Willd. 1806 - Actephila lindleyi
31. S. obovata - Flueggea virosa
32. S. phyllanthoides - Meineckia phyllanthoides
33. S. ramiflora - Flueggea suffruticosa
34. S. samoana - Flueggea flexuosa
35. S. schlechteri - Cleistanthus schlechteri
36. S. schuechiana - Flueggea schuechiana
37. S. schweinfurthii - Andrachne schweinfurthii
38. S. spirei - Flueggea spirei
39. S. suffruticosa - Flueggea suffruticosa
40. S. tinctoria - Flueggea tinctoria
41. S. trichogynis - Meineckia trichogynis
42. S. verrucosa - Flueggea verrucosa
43. S. virgata - Flueggea tinctoria
44. S. virosa - Flueggea virosa
45. S. virosa var. australiana - Flueggea virosa subsp. melanthesoides
