= Securinega leucopyrus =

Securinega leucopyrus can refer to the following plant species:

- Securinega leucopyrus Brandis, a synonym of Flueggea virosa (Roxb. ex Willd.) Royle subsp. virosa
- Securinega leucopyrus (Willd.) Müll.Arg., a synonym of Flueggea leucopyrus Willd.
