= Flueggea obovata =

Flueggea obovata can refer to the following plant species:

- Flueggea obovata Baill., a synonym of Margaritaria discoidea var. triplosphaera Radcl.-Sm.
- Flueggea obovata (Willd.) Wall. ex Fern.-Vill., a synonym of Flueggea virosa (Roxb. ex Willd.) Royle subsp. virosa
