= Indolizidine alkaloids =

Class of chemical compounds

Indolizidine, basic body of indolizidine alkaloids

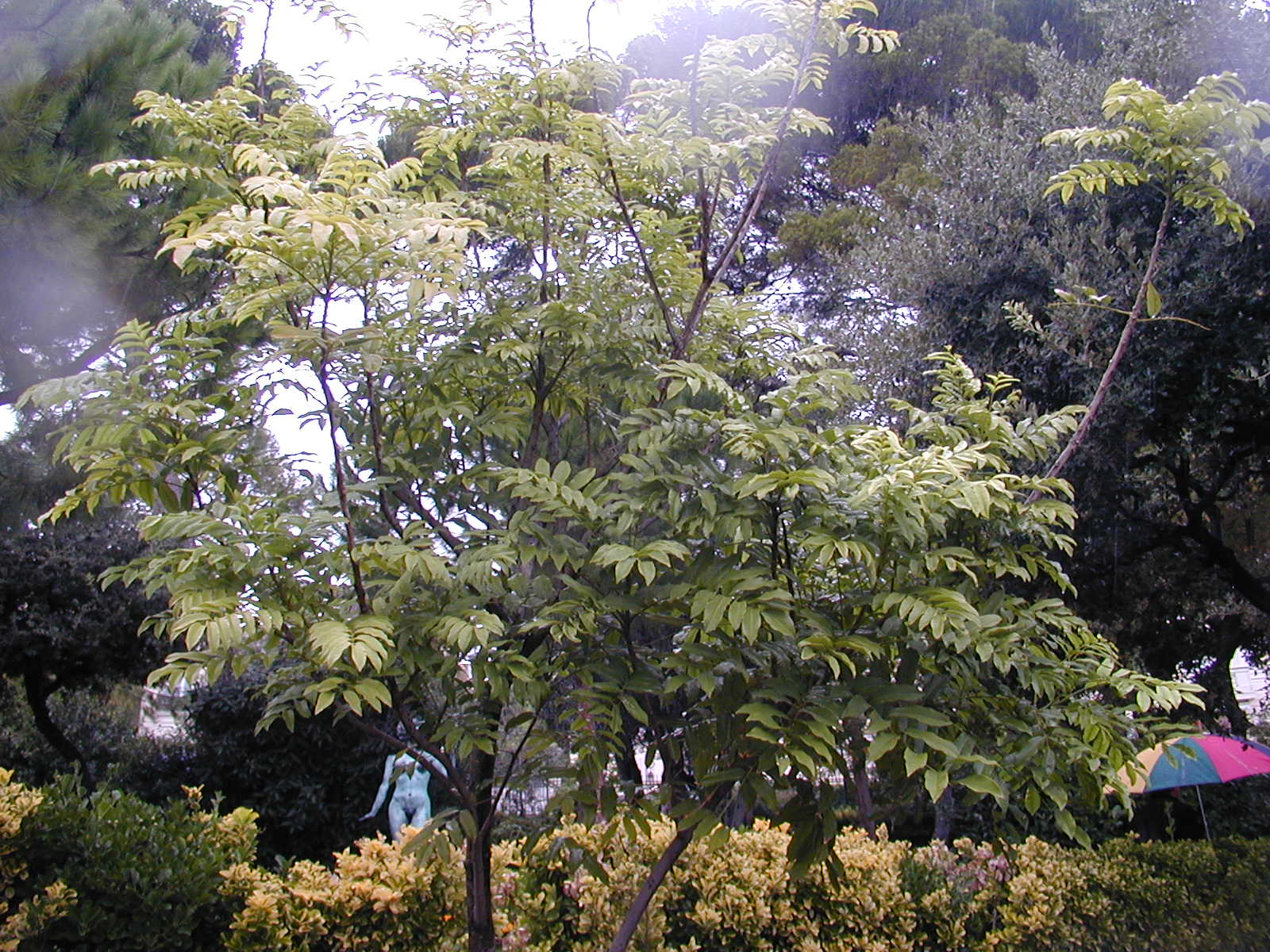
Australian chestnut (Castanospermum australe)

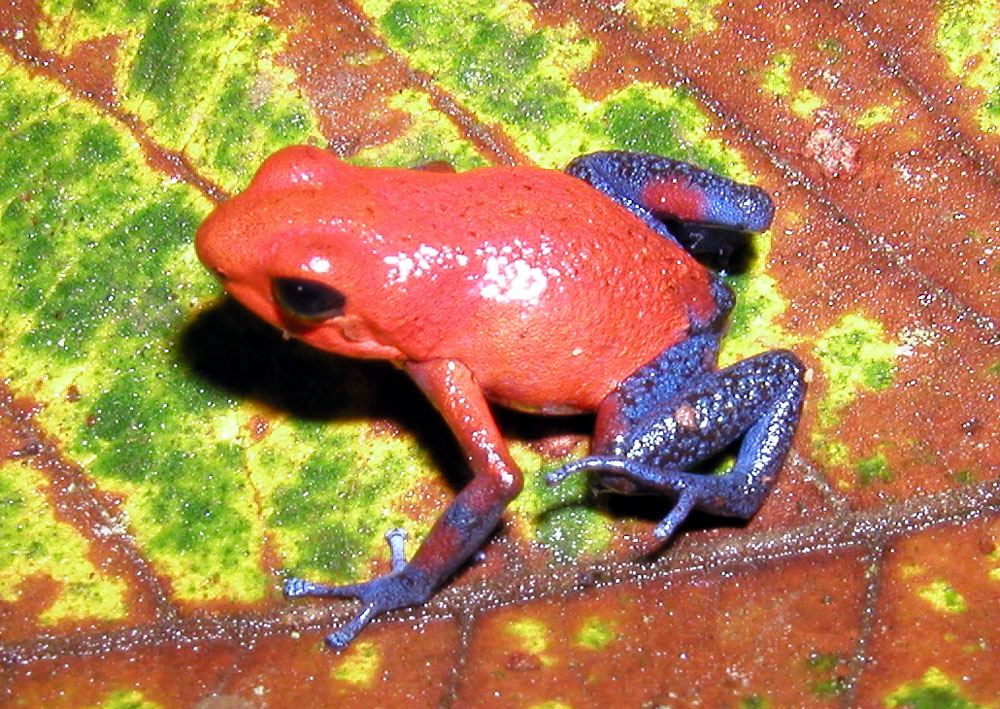
Strawberry poison-dart frog (Dendrobates pumilio)

Indolizidine alkaloids are natural products from various alkaloid groups whose structure can be derived from indolizidine.

== Occurrence ==
Indolizidine alkaloids are present in various plant families, including Elaeocarpaceae, Asclepiadaceae, and are also produced as metabolites by fungi and bacteria. For instance, Slaframine and swainsonine were identified in the fungus Rhizoctonia leguminicola, while Castanospermine was extracted from Castanospermum australe. Notably, this alkaloid group includes pumiliotoxins, which are the toxins of the strawberry poison-dart frog.

== Representatives ==
=== Polyhydroxy alkaloids ===
The polyhydroxy alkaloids include compounds like castanospermine and swainsonine.

(+)-Castanospermine

(-)-Swainsonine

=== Pumiliotoxins ===
The primary alkaloids within the pumiliotoxin category are pumiliotoxin A and pumiliotoxin B. Other representatives include gephyrotoxin 223 AB and gephyrotoxin.

=== Phenanthroindolizidine alkaloids ===
Representatives of this alkaloid group include tylophorine, tylocrebrine and tylophorinidine.

(+)-Tylophorine

(+)-Tylocrebrine

=== Elaeocarpus alkaloids ===
Representatives of this group include Elaeocanine A, Elaeocarpine and Elaeocarpidine.

=== Securinega alkaloids ===
The main alkaloid in this category is securinine. Others are securinol A and norsecurinine.

(-)-Norsecurinine

=== Tylophora alkaloids ===
Most of the Tylophora alkaloids belong to the phenanthroindolizidine alkaloid family, including tylophorine, septicin, and hispidine.

=== Ipomoea alkaloids ===
Main alkaloids of this group are Ipalbin and Ipomin. Furthermore, Ipalbidine and Ipohardine occur.

(+)-Ipalbidine

== Properties ==
Swainsonine-type compounds are currently under investigation for their potential as active agents against AIDS. Swainsonine and castanospermine function as inhibitors of sugar-splitting enzymes. Castanospermine also exhibits anti-cancer and anti-HIV properties, while Slaframine acts as a parasympathomimetic agent. Pumiliotoxin A enhances the contraction of striated muscle, and gephyrotoxin has similar effects to pumiliotoxin A. Due to their multifaceted impacts on the nervous system, these alkaloids are in high demand. However, their natural availability through frog skin extraction is severely limited due to species protection measures.
