= Norsecurinine =

Chemical compound

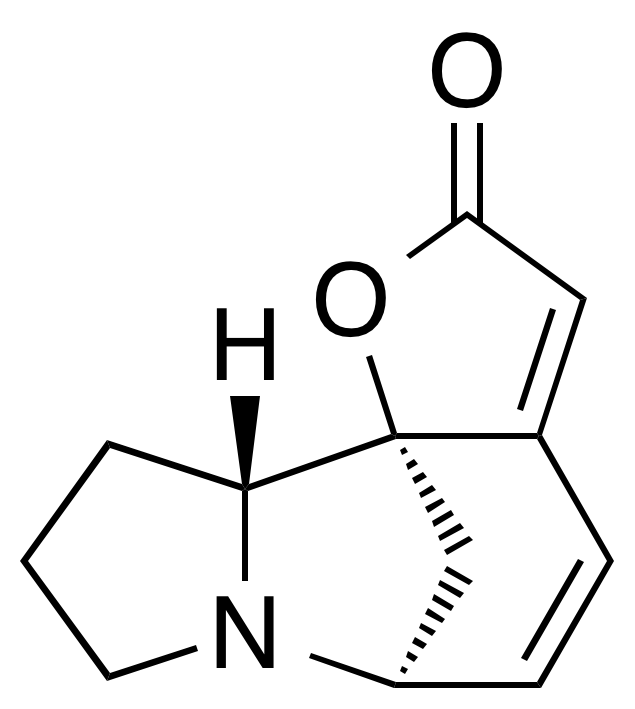

Identifiers
- IUPAC name: (1S,8S,13R)-2-oxa-9-azatetracyclo[6.5.1.0^{1,5}.0^{9,13}]tetradeca-4,6-dien-3-one
- CAS Number: 2650-35-3
- PubChem CID: 11106439
- ChemSpider: 9281575
- UNII: OPF6A516XH
- CompTox Dashboard (EPA): DTXSID40949368

Chemical and physical data
- Formula: C_{12}H_{13}NO_{2}
- Molar mass: 203.241 g·mol^{−1}
- 3D model (JSmol): Interactive image
- SMILES: C1C[C@@H]2[C@]34C[C@H](N2C1)C=CC3=CC(=O)O4
- InChI: InChI=1S/C12H13NO2/c14-11-6-8-3-4-9-7-12(8,15-11)10-2-1-5-13(9)10/h3-4,6,9-10H,1-2,5,7H2/t9-,10-,12+/m1/s1; Key:NBGOALXYAZVRPS-FOGDFJRCSA-N

Norsecurinine is a securinega alkaloid from Phyllanthus niruri.

== See also ==
- Securinine
