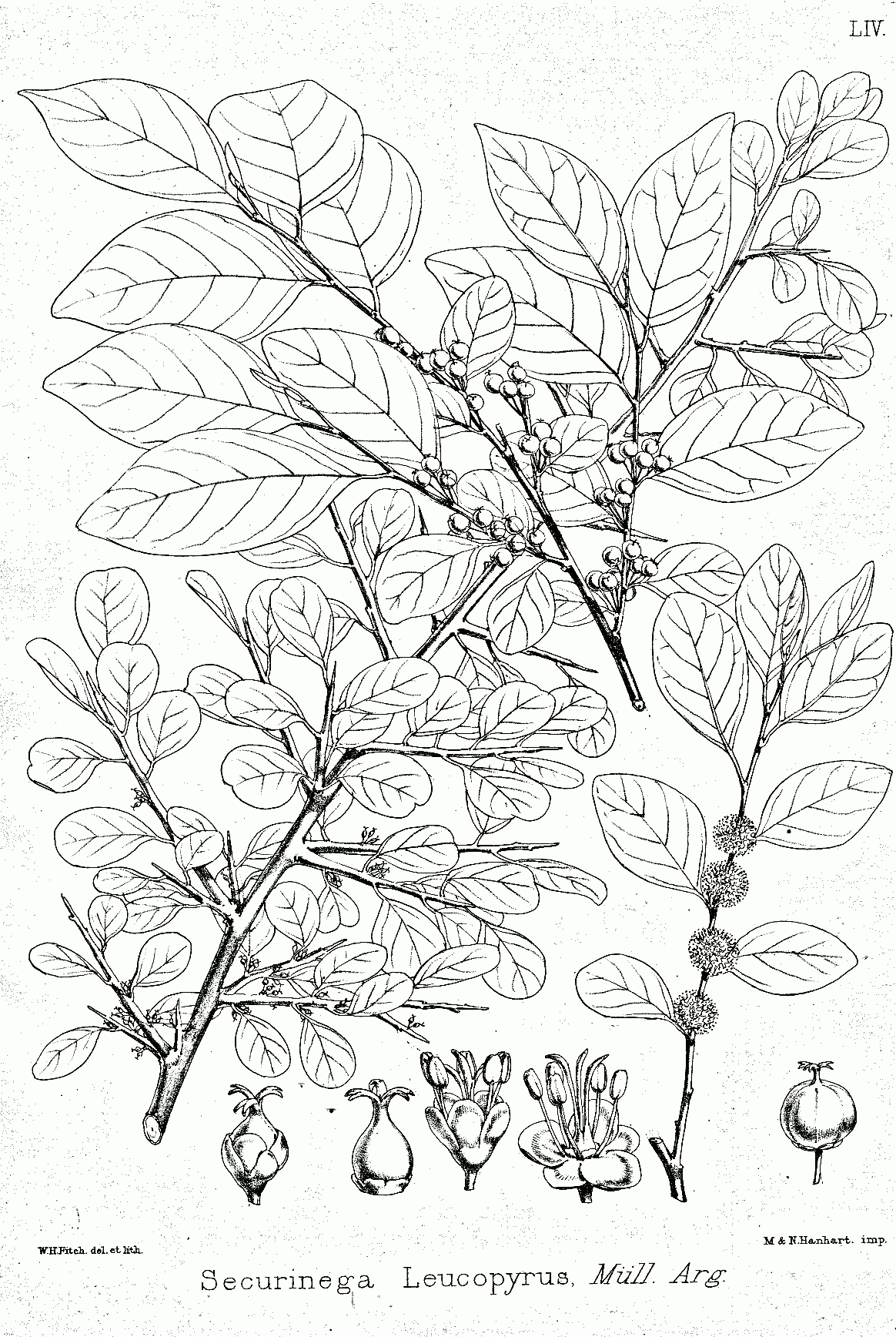
- Flueggea leucopyrus

Scientific classification
- Kingdom: Plantae
- Clade: Tracheophytes
- Clade: Angiosperms
- Clade: Eudicots
- Clade: Rosids
- Order: Malpighiales
- Family: Phyllanthaceae
- Subfamily: Phyllanthoideae
- Tribe: Phyllantheae
- Genus: Flueggea; Willd. 1806 not Rich. 1807 (Asparagaceae)

Synonyms
- Acidoton P.Browne 1856, rejected name, now Sw. 1788; Bessera Spreng., illegitimate homonym, not Schult. 1809 nor Schult. f. 1829 nor Vell. 1825; Colmeiroa Reut.; Coilmeroa Endl.; Fluggea Willd. spelling variant; Geblera Fisch. & C.A.Mey.; Neowawraea Rock; Pleiostemon Sond.; Richeriella Pax & K.Hoffm. in H.G.A.Engler; Villanova Pourr. ex Cutanda 1861, illegitimate homonym, not Ortega 1797 nor Lag. 1816 (both of the latter Asteraceae)

= Flueggea =

Bushweeds

Genus of flowering plants

Flueggea, the bushweeds, is a genus of shrubs and trees in the family Phyllanthaceae first described as a genus in 1806. It is widespread across much of Asia, Africa, and various oceanic islands, with a few species in South America and on the Iberian Peninsula.

The genus is named after John Fluegge, a German cryptogamic botanist.

Members of this genus all have entire ovate leaves and minute green flowers that form at the leaf axils in the form of fascicles or cymes. The fruits are berries, of the size of peas. With the exception of F. verrucosa, F. spirei, and occasionally F. virosa, they are dioecious.

== Taxonomy ==
The genus Flueggea consists of 12–16 species.

Many members of the genus were formerly classified under the genus Securinega.

Species

1. Flueggea acicularis - S China
2. Flueggea acidoton - West Indies
3. Flueggea anatolica - S Turkey
4. Flueggea elliptica - Ecuador
5. Flueggea flexuosa - Philippines, Maluku, New Guinea, SW Pacific
6. Flueggea gracilis - Hainan, Palawan, Borneo, Malaysia, S Thailand
7. Flueggea jullienii - Cambodia, Laos, Vietnam
8. Flueggea leucopyrus - Socotra, Sajid Island, S India, Sri Lanka, Sichuan, Yunnan
9. Flueggea monticola - Sichuan, Yunnan
10. Flueggea neowawraea - Hawaii
11. Flueggea schuechiana - Pernambuco
12. Flueggea spirei - Laos
13. Flueggea suffruticosa - Siberia, Mongolia, China, Korea, Japan
14. Flueggea tinctoria - Spain, Portugal
15. Flueggea verrucosa - Cape Province, KwaZulu-Natal
16. Flueggea virosa - Africa, Madagascar, SW + S + SE Asia, Mascarenes, N Australia

Formerly included

moved to other genera (Leptopus Margaritaria Meineckia Ophiopogon )

1. F. anceps - Ophiopogon japonicus
2. F. angulata Raf. 1838 not (Schumach. & Thonn.) Schrank 1828 - Ophiopogon japonicus
3. F. bailloniana - Margaritaria discoidea var. triplosphaera
4. F. capillipes - Leptopus chinensis
5. F. dracaenoides - Ophiopogon dracaenoides
6. F. dubia - Ophiopogon intermedius
7. F. eglandulosa - Margaritaria anomala
8. F. fagifolia - Margaritaria discoidea var. fagifolia
9. F. griffithii - Ophiopogon intermedius
10. F. hilariana - Meineckia neogranatensis subsp. hilariana
11. F. intermedia - Ophiopogon intermedius
12. F. jaburan - Ophiopogon jaburan
13. F. jacquemontiana - Ophiopogon intermedius
14. F. japonica (Thunb.) Rich. not 1807 (Miq.) Pax 1890 - Ophiopogon japonicus
15. F. major - Margaritaria anomala
16. F. meineckia - Meineckia phyllanthoides
17. F. nitida - Margaritaria discoidea var. nitida
18. F. obovata Baill. 1861 not (Willd.) Wall. ex Fern.-Vill. 1880 - Margaritaria discoidea var. triplosphaera
19. F. prolifera - Ophiopogon caulescens
20. F. trichogynis - Meineckia trichogynis
21. F. wallichiana Kunth 1825 not Baill. 1858 - Ophiopogon intermedius
