= Hyloxalus maquipucuna =

Conservation status
- Critically Endangered (IUCN 3.1)

Scientific classification
- Kingdom: Animalia
- Phylum: Chordata
- Class: Amphibia
- Order: Anura
- Family: Dendrobatidae
- Genus: Hyloxalus
- Species: H. maquipucuna

Binomial name
- Hyloxalus maquipucuna (Coloma, 1995)

Synonyms
- Colostethus maquipucuna Coloma, 1995

Species of frog

Hyloxalus maquipucuna is a species of frog in the family Dendrobatidae. It is endemic to Ecuador where it is only known from its type locality in the Maquipucuna reserve, in the Pichincha Province.

== Description ==
Males measure 21 mm (0.83 in) and females 24 mm (0.94 in) in snout–vent length (based on 1 male and 2 females, the type series). It has moderately robust body. It is black dorsally and laterally, with a bright yellow dorsolateral stripe that extend to eye. Legs are orange and venter is yellow. Skin of dorsum is smooth (except slightly pustular in pelvic region).

== Etymology ==
Scientists named this frog for its type locality: Reserva Maquipucuna. "Maquipuncuna" is a Quechua word that refers to steep valleys that resemble cupped hands.

== Habitat and conservation ==
The frog was observed in 1984, in a cloud forests about 1,800 m (5,900 ft) asl. It was found near streams, in which scientists infer that it breeds. However, subsequent surveys to the area produced no further observations. The IUCN classifies this species as critically endangered and possibly extinct, with no more than 50 mature individuals expected alive as of 2022. Scientist believes it may have been subject to climate events of the later 1980s and to the fungal disease chytridiomycosis.

Hyloxalus maquipucuna has not been observed after it was collected for the first time in 1984. This may be due to insufficient survey effort. As the type locality is within a reverse, forest clearance is not a threat.
