= Johannes Flüggé =

German botanist (1775–1816)

Johannes (Johann) Flüggé (22 June 1775 – 28 June 1816) was a German botanist and physician who was a native of Hamburg. He undertook botanical excursions from 1792 to Heligoland and Neuwerk.

He studied medicine and natural history at the Universities of Jena, Vienna and Göttingen, and in 1800 received his doctorate at the University of Erlangen. Afterwards he undertook further botanical excursions throughout Germany and France.

In 1810 Flüggé established the first botanical garden in Hamburg, which was destroyed when Napoleon's army occupied the city in 1813.

He is remembered for his research of grasses in the genus Paspalum. The plant genus Flueggea from the family Phyllanthaceae is named in his honor. In 1810, he published the monograph Graminum Monographiae. Pars 1, Paspalum, Reimaria.

Johannes Flügge had been married to Karoline Auguste Preller since 1811. Their son August died on 3 December 1839 in the district of Schleswig. A diary with entries on his trip to France, among other things, is in the library of the Botanical Garden in Hamburg. Flügge's brother Benedict Gilbert (1777-1821) was a merchant and wine merchant (from 1804 in Kiel and also in Bordeaux).
