= Celgosivir =

Drug for hep-C

Clinical data
- Other names: 6-O-Butanoylcastanospermine; MDL-28574; MX-3253

Legal status
- Legal status: Investigational

Identifiers
- IUPAC name: [(1S,6S,7S,8R,8aR)-1,7,8-Trihydroxy-1,2,3,5,6,7,8,8a-octahydroindolizin-6-yl] butanoate
- CAS Number: 121104-96-9
- PubChem CID: 60734; 3033824
- ChemSpider: 54737
- UNII: 895VG117HN
- CompTox Dashboard (EPA): DTXSID70153153

Chemical and physical data
- Formula: C_{12}H_{21}NO_{5}
- Molar mass: 259.302 g·mol^{−1}
- 3D model (JSmol): Interactive image
- SMILES: CCCC(=O)O[C@H]1CN2CC[C@@H]([C@@H]2[C@H]([C@@H]1O)O)O
- InChI: InChI=1S/C12H21NO5/c1-2-3-9(15)18-8-6-13-5-4-7(14)10(13)12(17)11(8)16/h7-8,10-12,14,16-17H,2-6H2,1H3/t7-,8-,10+,11+,12+/m0/s1; Key:HTJGLYIJVSDQAE-VWNXEWBOSA-N

Celgosivir, in development by Migenix for the treatment of hepatitis C virus (HCV) infection, is an oral prodrug of the natural product castanospermine that inhibits alpha-glucosidase I, an enzyme that plays a critical role in viral maturation by initiating the processing of the N-linked oligosaccharides of viral envelope glycoproteins. Celgosivir is well absorbed in vitro and in vivo, and is rapidly converted to castanospermine. Celgosivir has a novel mechanism of action (preventing the glycosylation of viral proteins by the host), and demonstrates broad antiviral activity in vitro.

== Clinical trials ==
Celgosivir is not efficient as a monotherapy for the treatment of HCV, but has demonstrated a synergistic effect in combination with pegylated interferon alfa-2b plus ribavirin, both in vitro and in phase II clinical trials that last up to 1 year in patients with chronic HCV infection. Celgosivir may prove to be a valuable component for combination therapy and may help to prevent the apparition of drug resistance. Long-term toxicity studies are necessary to confirm the safety of celgosivir in humans.

Although generally safe and well tolerated, celgosivir does not seem to reduce viral load or fever burden in patients with dengue fever.
