= Flueggea anatolica =

Conservation status
- Endangered (IUCN 2.3)

Scientific classification
- Kingdom: Plantae
- Clade: Tracheophytes
- Clade: Angiosperms
- Clade: Eudicots
- Clade: Rosids
- Order: Malpighiales
- Family: Phyllanthaceae
- Genus: Flueggea
- Species: F. anatolica

Binomial name
- Flueggea anatolica Gemici

Species of flowering plant

Flueggea anatolica is a species of plant in the family Phyllanthaceae, endemic to Turkey. The species exists in only three small, disjunct populations in southern Turkey, at elevations ranging from 300 to 970 metres. It produces small seeds with an active ballistic dispersal mechanism, which show physiological dormancy requiring about 10 weeks of cold stratification to germinate successfully. The plant primarily regenerates through sprouts rather than seeds in the wild, contributing to its vulnerable conservation status. F. anatolica's wood structure features a semi-ring porous pattern with predominantly single vessels that have spiral thickenings and alternately arranged pits, displaying the "Glochidion-type" wood characteristics common in Phyllanthaceae. Conservation efforts focus on seed collection and storage techniques, as the species requires protection due to its extremely restricted range.

== Description ==
Flueggea anatolica is a woody shrub with small seeds that have an average 1000-seed weight of 4.9 grams. The seeds measure about 2.57 mm in length, 1.93 mm in width, and 1.71 mm in thickness, though these dimensions demonstrate significant variation between different populations. The shrub's fruits have an active ballistic dispersal mechanism, meaning they actively eject their seeds during the fruit drying phase, making collection from the ground difficult due to their small size.

== Distribution ==
The species exists in only three small, disjunct populations in southern Turkey. These populations are located in Tarsus (elevation: 300 m), Kozan (380 m), and Andırın (970 m). In these limited areas, F. anatolica individuals arise primarily from sprouts, with regeneration from seeds being rare in the wild. This limited distribution contributes significantly to its endangered status.

== Conservation status ==
Flueggea anatolica is classified as critically endangered according to Turkey's conservation assessments. As a relatively recently discovered endemic woody plant, it requires urgent conservation attention. Flueggea species are mostly found in relict populations worldwide, with F. anatolica being particularly vulnerable due to its extremely restricted range.

== Seed biology and germination ==
The seeds of F. anatolica show physiological dormancy, which means they require specific environmental conditions to overcome internal germination barriers. These seeds require roughly 10 weeks of prechilling (exposure to cold, moist conditions) at 4°C to break dormancy. After this pretreatment, the seeds germinate best at temperatures between 16–28°C, with 24°C appearing to be optimal for both germination rate and speed. Properly pretreated seeds can achieve germination rates of 90–92%, though they do not germinate during the prechilling period at 4°C itself. Studies have also shown that a warm incubation period (24°C for 4 weeks) prior to prechilling has only a minor effect on breaking dormancy, suggesting that cold stratification is the primary requirement.

== Seed storage and viability ==
For conservation purposes, F. anatolica seeds can be stored at a moisture content of 3–8% and a temperature of 4° C or less. Seeds maintained at these conditions can retain their viability for at least one year, with minimal loss of germination potential. Research indicates that dormant seeds (those that have not been prechilled) store better than nondormant ones, which lose significant viability even under optimal storage conditions. This information is important for ex situ conservation efforts in seed banks, particularly given the species' endangered status.

== Seed maturation ==
The timing of seed maturation varies with altitude. Seeds from lower-altitude populations (like Tarsus at 300 m) can be harvested earlier (August-September) than those from higher elevations (like Andırın at 970 m), which should be collected around late September for optimal maturity and viability. Seed viability is at its highest level when the seed reaches physiological maturity and begins to decrease thereafter. Due to the ballistic dispersal mechanism of the fruits, seeds must be harvested directly from the plants before dispersal occurs.

== Wood anatomy ==
The wood structure of F. anatolica has been studied to understand its biology and relationships with other species. Its wood has a semi-ring porous pattern, meaning there is a noticeable boundary between each year's growth rings. Most vessels—the tubes that transport water—are single rather than grouped, and their ends have simple openings allowing fluid to flow easily. The walls of these vessels feature small pits arranged alternately and characteristic spiral thickenings. Other wood cells include vascular tracheids (supportive cells that also transport water), which similarly have spiral thickenings, and libriform fibres (cells mainly providing strength) that have internal partitions. Axial parenchyma cells—storage cells running vertically—are scarce and located near vessels. The wood has rays—horizontal bands of cells—comprising a mixture of cell types; these rays vary in width from one to six cells and include some cells with openings.

Anatomically, F. anatolica has a syndrome of features common in Phyllanthaceae known as "Glochidion-type" wood structure. This wood type matches well with other species in the genus Flueggea. Among the species studied, F. suffruticosa appears most similar to F. anatolica in wood structure.
