= Castanospermine =

Names
- Preferred IUPAC name (1S,6S,7R,8R,8aR)-Octahydroindolizine-1,6,7,8-tetrol

Identifiers
CAS Number	79831-76-8
3D model (JSmol)	Interactive image
ChEBI	CHEBI:27860
ChEMBL	ChEMBL311226
ChemSpider	49177
DrugBank	DB01816
ECHA InfoCard	100.127.469
EC Number	616-743-4
KEGG	C02256
PubChem CID	54445
UNII	Q0I3184XM7
CompTox Dashboard (EPA)	DTXSID601026043
- InChI: InChI=1S/C8H15NO4/c10-4-1-2-9-3-5(11)7(12)8(13)6(4)9/h4-8,10-13H,1-3H2/t4-,5-,6+,7+,8+/m0/s1 Key: JDVVGAQPNNXQDW-TVNFTVLESA-N; InChI=1/C8H15NO4/c10-4-1-2-9-3-5(11)7(12)8(13)6(4)9/h4-8,10-13H,1-3H2/t4-,5-,6+,7+,8+/m0/s1 Key: JDVVGAQPNNXQDW-TVNFTVLEBE
- SMILES: O[C@H]1CCN2[C@H]1[C@@H](O)[C@H](O)[C@@H](O)C2

Properties
Chemical formula	C_{8}H_{15}NO_{4}
Molar mass	189.209 g/mol
Appearance	White to off-white solid
Melting point	212 to 215 °C (414 to 419 °F; 485 to 488 K)
Solubility in water	Soluble

Hazards
- GHS labelling
Pictograms	(GHS07: Exclamation mark)
Signal word	Warning
Hazard statements	H302, H312, H332
Precautionary statements	P261, P264, P270, P271, P280, P301+P312, P302+P352, P304+P312, P304+P340, P312, P322, P330, P363, P501
- Except where otherwise noted, data are given for materials in their standard state (at 25 °C [77 °F], 100 kPa). verify (what is ?) Infobox references

Castanospermine is an indolizidine alkaloid first isolated from the seeds of Castanospermum australe. It is a potent inhibitor of some glucosidase enzymes and has antiviral activity in vitro and in mouse models.

The castanospermine derivative celgosivir is an antiviral drug candidate that as of 2009 was in development for possible use in treating hepatitis C virus (HCV) infection.

== Biosynthesis ==
L-Lysine undergoes a transamination to form α-aminoadipic acid. α-Aminoadipic acid undergoes a ring closure and then a reduction to form L-pipecolic acid.

Biosynthesis of castanospermine - pathway 1: transamination of L-Lys

In the alternate pathway L-Lys cyclizes and forms the enamine, which reduces to L-pipecolic acid.

HSCoA and then malonyl-CoA react in a Claisen reaction with L-pipecolic acid to form SCoA ester which undergoes a ring closure to form 1-indolizidinone. The carbonyl on 1-indolizidinone is reduced to the hydroxyl group. The molecule is then further hydroxylated to form the final product castanospermine.

Figure 2: Biosynthesis of castanospermine - pathway 2: cyclization of L-Lys to form pipecolic acid

== See also ==
- Swainsonine
