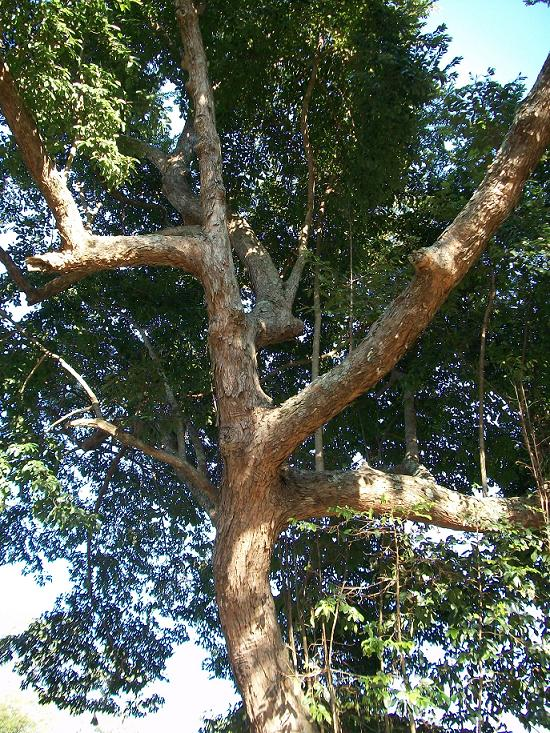

Conservation status
- Least Concern (IUCN 3.1)

Scientific classification
- Kingdom: Plantae
- Clade: Tracheophytes
- Clade: Angiosperms
- Clade: Eudicots
- Clade: Rosids
- Order: Malpighiales
- Family: Phyllanthaceae
- Genus: Margaritaria
- Species: M. discoidea

Binomial name
- Margaritaria discoidea (Baill.) G.L.Webster

Synonyms
- Phyllanthus discoideus (Baill.) Müll.Arg. Cicca discoidea Baill. Flueggea nitida Pax; Phyllanthus flacourtioides Hutch. Flueggea bailloniana (Müll.Arg.); Securinega bailloniana Müll.Arg. Fluggea obovata Baill. Margaritaria obovata (Baill.) G.L.Webster; Flueggea fagifolia Pax; Phyllanthus amapondensis Sim

= Margaritaria discoidea =

Species of tree

Margaritaria discoidea is a tree in the family Phyllanthaceae, commonly known as the pheasant-berry, egossa red pear or bushveld peacock-berry. These trees are native to the warmer, higher rainfall areas of Africa.

== Taxonomy ==
This species has a complex taxonomic history with many synonyms (see taxobox); partially because of its morphological variability. These trees were formerly placed in the genus Phyllanthus and in the family Euphorbiaceae. 4 varieties are now recognized (1981), these having in the past been treated variously as distinct species, subspecies or synonymous with typical M. discoidea. In KwaZulu-Natal, South Africa, there are 3 varieties:

- M. discoidea var. discoidea
- M. discoidea var. fagifolia
- M. discoidea var. nitida

== Distribution ==
This species is distributed from the coastal areas of the Eastern Cape, South Africa, to tropical Africa, as far as Senegal in West Africa.

== Description ==
A medium to tall tree in forest and riverine situations, where it can grow up to 30 m tall, or a shrub or small tree in dryer and more open situations. The stem is usually straight with rough, flaking bark which is grayish-brown on top and reddish beneath. The branches of young trees grow horizontally from the stem. The leaves are alternate and produced on one plane. Male and female flowers are produced on separate trees, with both types of flowers being small, greenish-yellow in colour, and fragrant. The fruit is a three-lobed capsule about 10 mm in diameter and golden-brown when ripe. The inner part of the fruit is dark metallic blue-green; giving rise to the name bushveld peacock-berry.

== Medicinal use ==
=== Scientific investigation ===
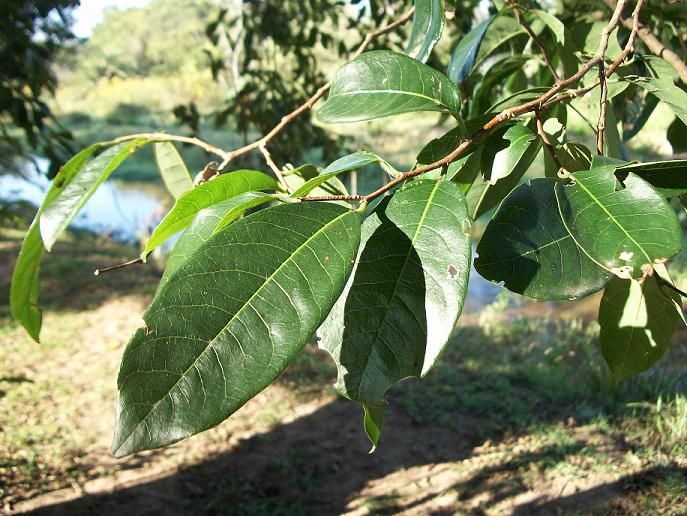
M. discoidea leaves

These trees contain many alkaloids including phyllochrysine (a central nervous system stimulant) and securinine. Oral administration of an aqueous extract at various concentrations showed no acute toxicity in rats and no adverse change in behavior; suggesting that it may be safe for pharmacological uses. The aqueous extract of M. discoidea stem bark was investigated for its anti-inflammatory and analgesic activities in animal models (rats): The extract reduced significantly the formation of oedema induced by carrageenan and histamine, and had a good analgesic effect, with the results comparable to those of indomethacin, the reference drug used in the study.

=== In traditional medicine ===
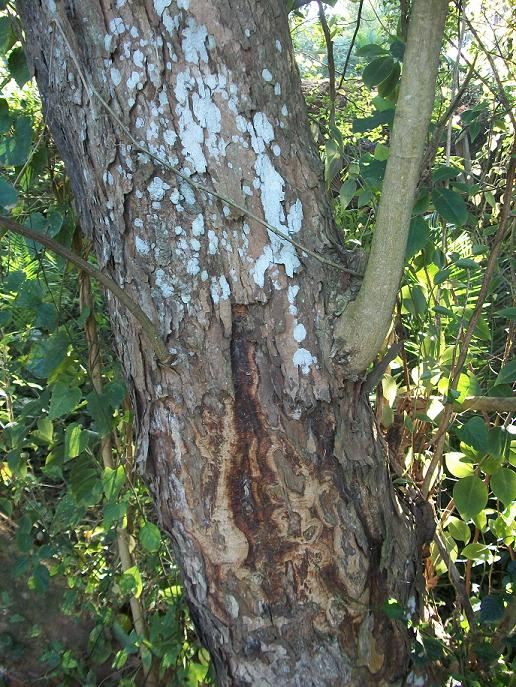
Stem of Margaritaria discoidea at Ilanda Wilds, South Africa, showing old scar from bark removal for traditional medicinal use

These trees are used in traditional medicine across Africa: A leaf-decoction is taken in Ivory Coast for blennorrhoea and for poisoning, while in Ubangi a decoction of roots and leafy twigs is also used for blennorrhoea A wash of the decoction is a stimulant in case of general fatigue. The bark is used as a purgative in West Africa and anthelmintic in Central Africa. The Fula people use the bark for toothache, in the Central African Republic a decoction is used for post-partum pains, and in the Republic of the Congo for stomach and kidney complaints and to facilitate parturition. In Malawi the powdered bark extract is applied to swellings and inflammation for quick relief.

== Other uses ==
=== As fodder ===
The dried leaves can be used as a food supplement for sheep.

=== Forestry and timber ===
The wood is hard and durable and the trees are fast growing from seed, suggesting that this species may be suitable for agroforestry. The sap-wood is yellowish, and the heartwood is pinkish-white to brownish-red, hard, heavy, of medium texture, not difficult to work and is suitable for cabinetry; finishing smoothly and taking a fine polish. The wood can be sawn into planks and used for ordinary building purposes. These trees have been planted in mixed plantations, with a suggestion that they may have a rotation time of 40 to 60 years.

=== As an acaricide ===
Extracts from this plant can be used to kill ticks, including Rhipicephalus appendiculatus and Amblyomma variegatum, and an application of a 50% concentrated oil extract on rabbit ears caused a complete inhibition of attachment by adult R. appendiculatus and A. variegatum for at least 4 days. When applied on ticks on cattle in the field, the 50% oil extract induced 100% and 50% mortalities in adult R. appendiculatus and A. variegatum, respectively, by 2 days post-application.

== Ecological significance ==
The leaves are eaten by the larvae of the scarce forest emperor butterfly (Charaxes etesipe tavetensis). The flowers are much visited by bees and other insects. The seeds are a relished food of guineafowl and francolin. Seed in Kenya have attracted bushbuck. M. discoidea is also eaten by red duiker.
