= Securinine =

Chemical compound

Identifiers
- IUPAC name: (1S,2R,8S)-14-Oxa-7-azatetracyclo[6.6.1.0^{1,11}.0^{2,7}]pentadeca-9,11-dien-13-one
- CAS Number: 5610-40-2
- PubChem CID: 442872
- ChemSpider: 391181
- UNII: G4VS580P5E
- KEGG: C10614
- ChEBI: CHEBI:9079
- ChEMBL: ChEMBL303062
- CompTox Dashboard (EPA): DTXSID7045944
- ECHA InfoCard: 100.222.962

Chemical and physical data
- Formula: C_{13}H_{15}NO_{2}
- Molar mass: 217.268 g·mol^{−1}
- 3D model (JSmol): Interactive image
- SMILES: C1CCN2[C@H](C1)[C@]34C[C@H]2C=CC3=CC(=O)O4
- InChI: InChI=1S/C13H15NO2/c15-12-7-9-4-5-10-8-13(9,16-12)11-3-1-2-6-14(10)11/h4-5,7,10-11H,1-3,6,8H2/t10-,11-,13+/m1/s1; Key:SWZMSZQQJRKFBP-WZRBSPASSA-N

Securinine is an alkaloid found in Securinega suffruticosa and Phyllanthus niruri.

== Pharmacology ==
Securinine has pro-convulsant effects and it has a strong spastic effect, similar to the actions of strychnine.

Securinine is a GABA-_{A} antagonist.

== See also ==
- Norsecurinine
- Phenazine
