= Blennorrhoea =

Secretion of pus by a mucous membrane

Blennorrhoea a.k.a. blennorrhagia or myxorrhoea ('blenno' mucus, 'rrhoea' flow), is a medical term denoting an excessive discharge of watery mucus, especially from the urethra or the vagina, and also used in ophthalmology for an abnormal discharge from the eye, but now regarded as a synonym for conjunctivitis and accordingly rarely used.

Inclusion blennorrhoea a.k.a. chlamydial conjunctivitis or swimming pool conjunctivitis, is a condition affecting infants born to women infected with inclusion conjunctivitis of the urogenital tract, frequently caused by Chlamydia trachomatis, a sexually transmitted organism and often going unnoticed as a mild infection. Such infants may develop acute neonatal conjunctivitis within a few days of birth, and smears from their eyes reveal the presence of characteristic inclusion bodies. If left untreated the infection may persist for 3–12 months and heal, but could result in permanent scarring of the conjunctiva.
