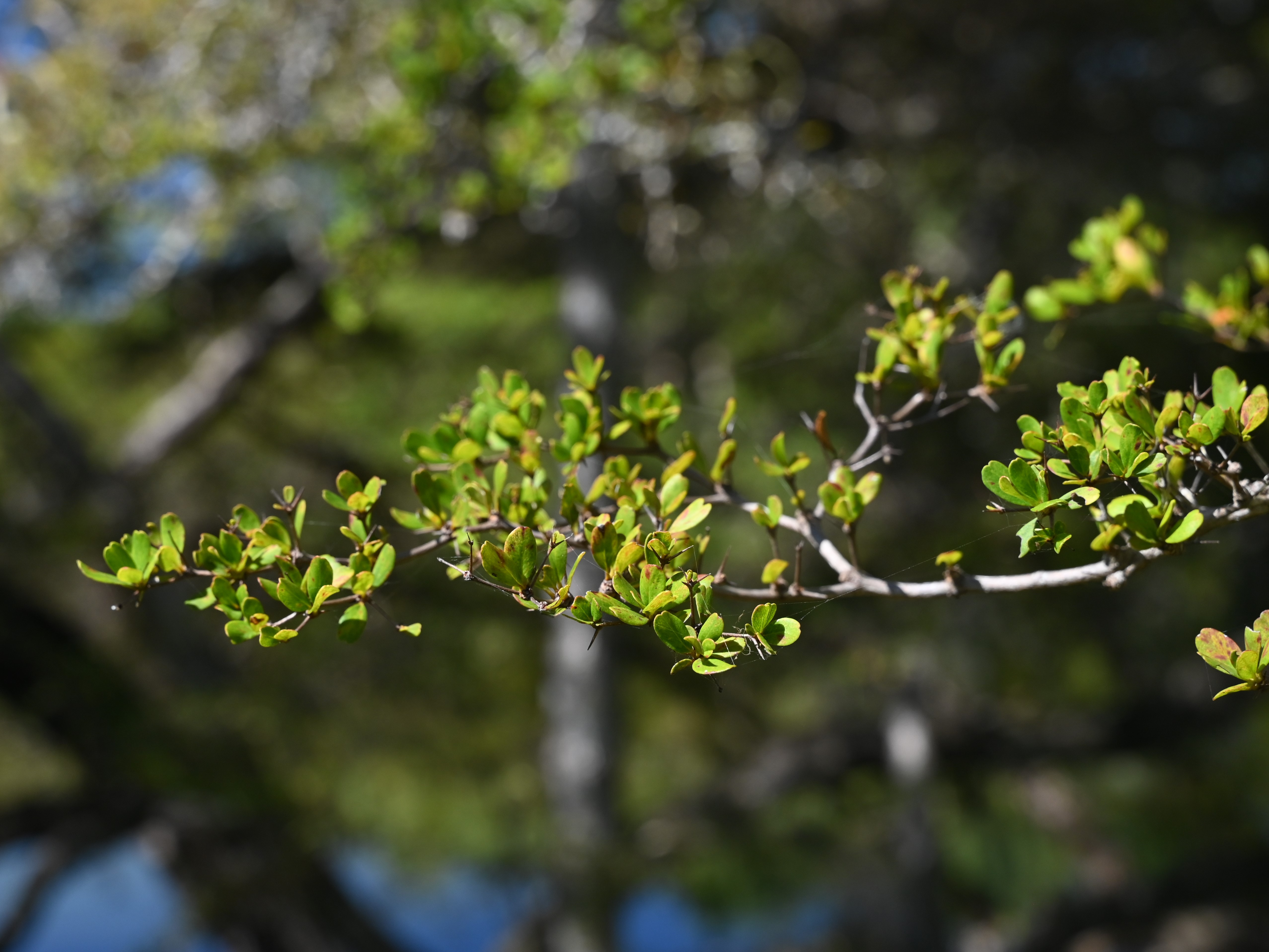
- Foliage
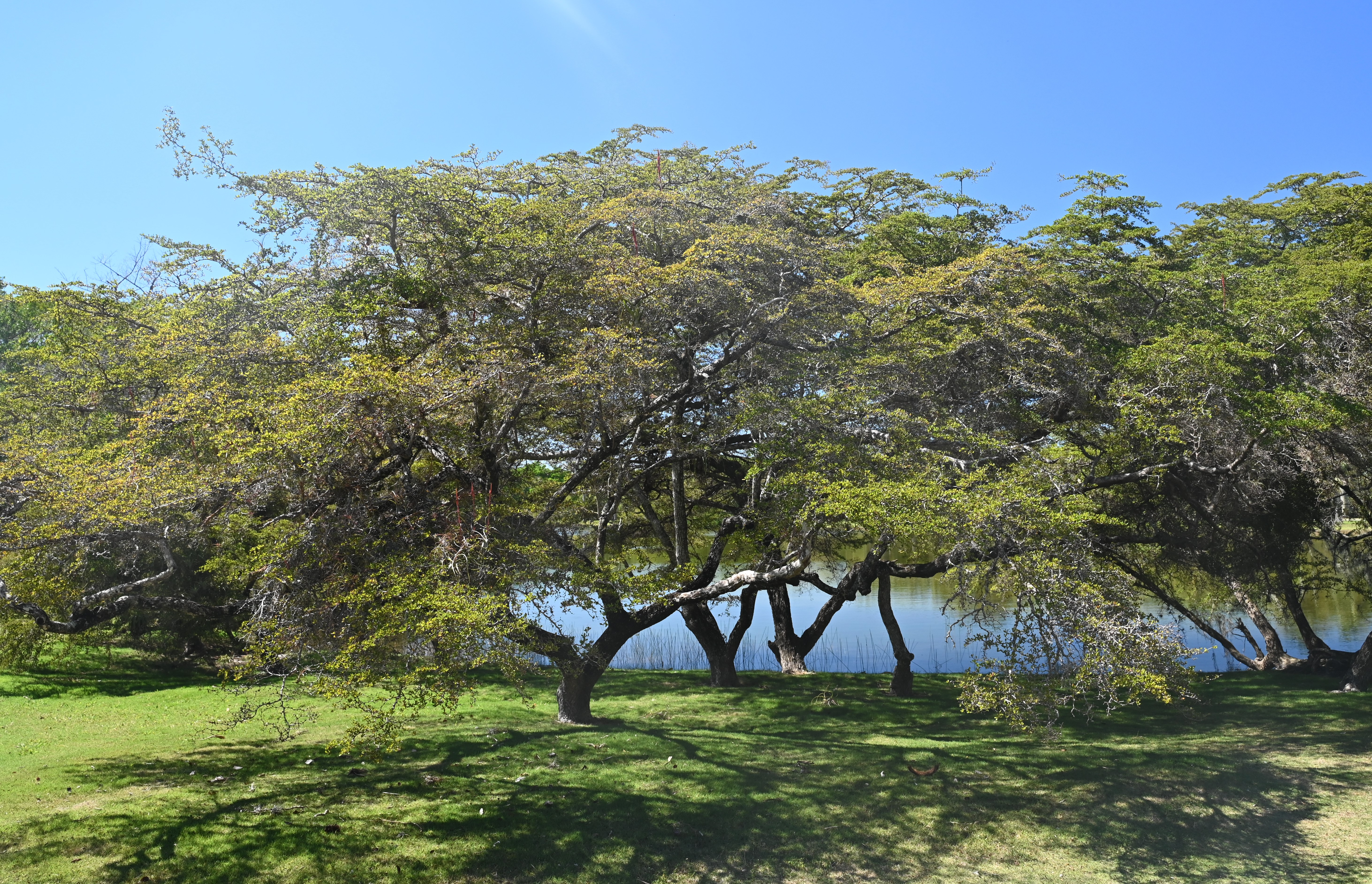
- At Fairchild Tropical Botanic Garden

Scientific classification
- Kingdom: Plantae
- Clade: Tracheophytes
- Clade: Angiosperms
- Clade: Eudicots
- Clade: Rosids
- Order: Malpighiales
- Family: Phyllanthaceae
- Genus: Flueggea
- Species: F. acidoton

Binomial name
- Flueggea acidoton (L.) G.L.Webster

Synonyms
- Acidoton acidothamnus (Griseb.) Kuntze; Adelia acidoton L.; Adelia gracilis Salisb.; Flueggea acidothamnus Griseb.; Securinega acidothamnus (Griseb.) Müll.Arg.; Securinega acidoton (L.) Fawc.

= Flueggea acidoton =

Species of plant

Flueggea acidoton, the simpleleaf bushweed (a name it shares with Flueggea virosa), is a species of flowering plant in the family Phyllanthaceae. It is native to the Caribbean. A shrub or small tree, it is found in the seasonally dry tropics.
