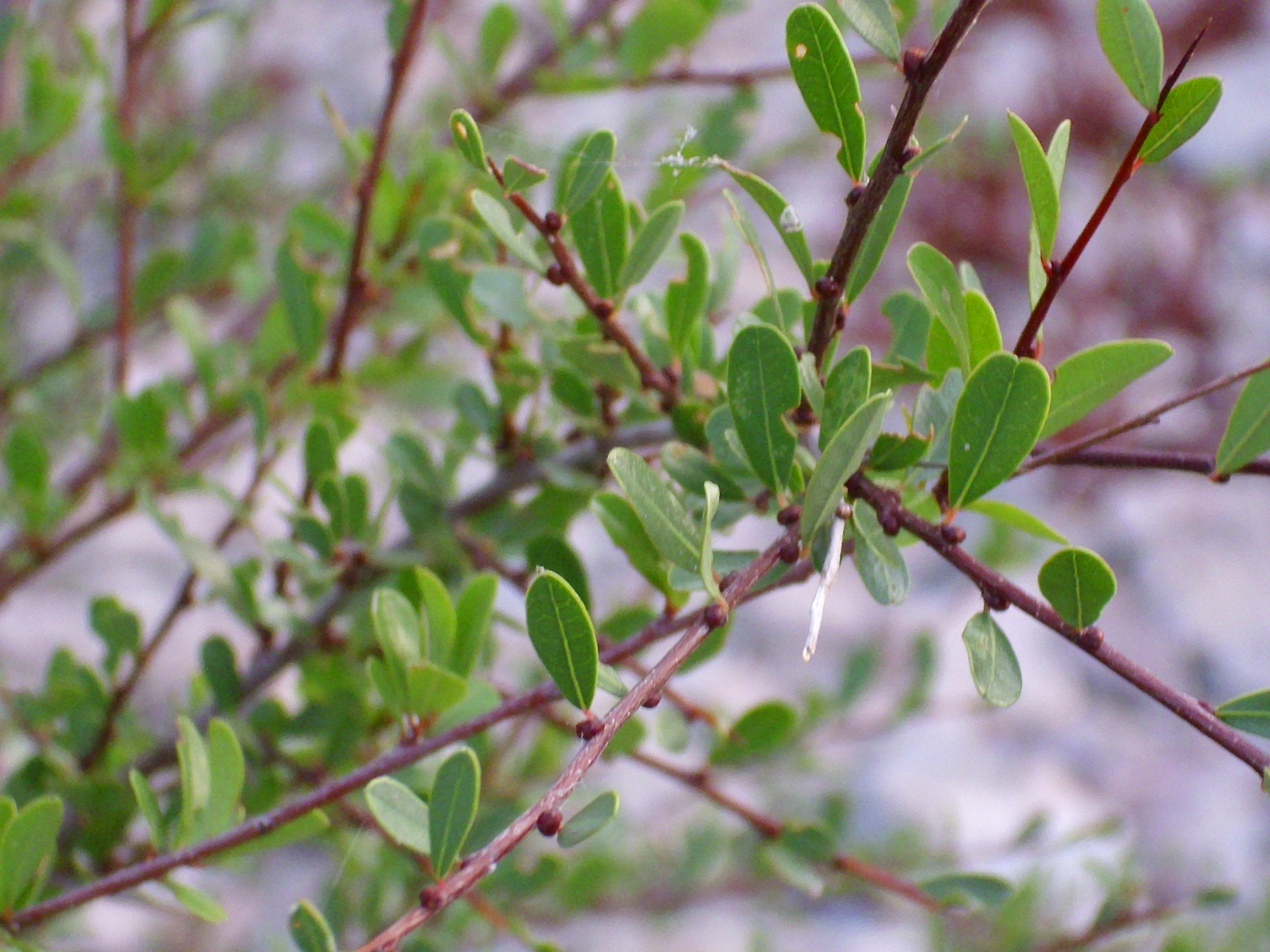

Conservation status
- Least Concern (IUCN 3.1)

Scientific classification
- Kingdom: Plantae
- Clade: Tracheophytes
- Clade: Angiosperms
- Clade: Eudicots
- Clade: Rosids
- Order: Malpighiales
- Family: Phyllanthaceae
- Genus: Flueggea
- Species: F. tinctoria

Binomial name
- Flueggea tinctoria (L.) G.L.Webster

Synonyms
- Securinega buxifolia (Poir.) Müll.Arg.; Villanova buxifolia (Poir.) Pourr.; Rhamnus tinctoria L.; Securinega tinctoria (L.) Rothm.; Colmeiroa buxifolia (Poir.) Reut.; Acidoton buxifolius (Poir.) Kuntze; Adelia virgata Poir.; Securinega virgata (Poir.) Maire

= Flueggea tinctoria =

Species of shrub

Flueggea tinctoria is a species of flowering shrub in the family Phyllanthaceae, endemic to the Iberian Peninsula.

== Description ==
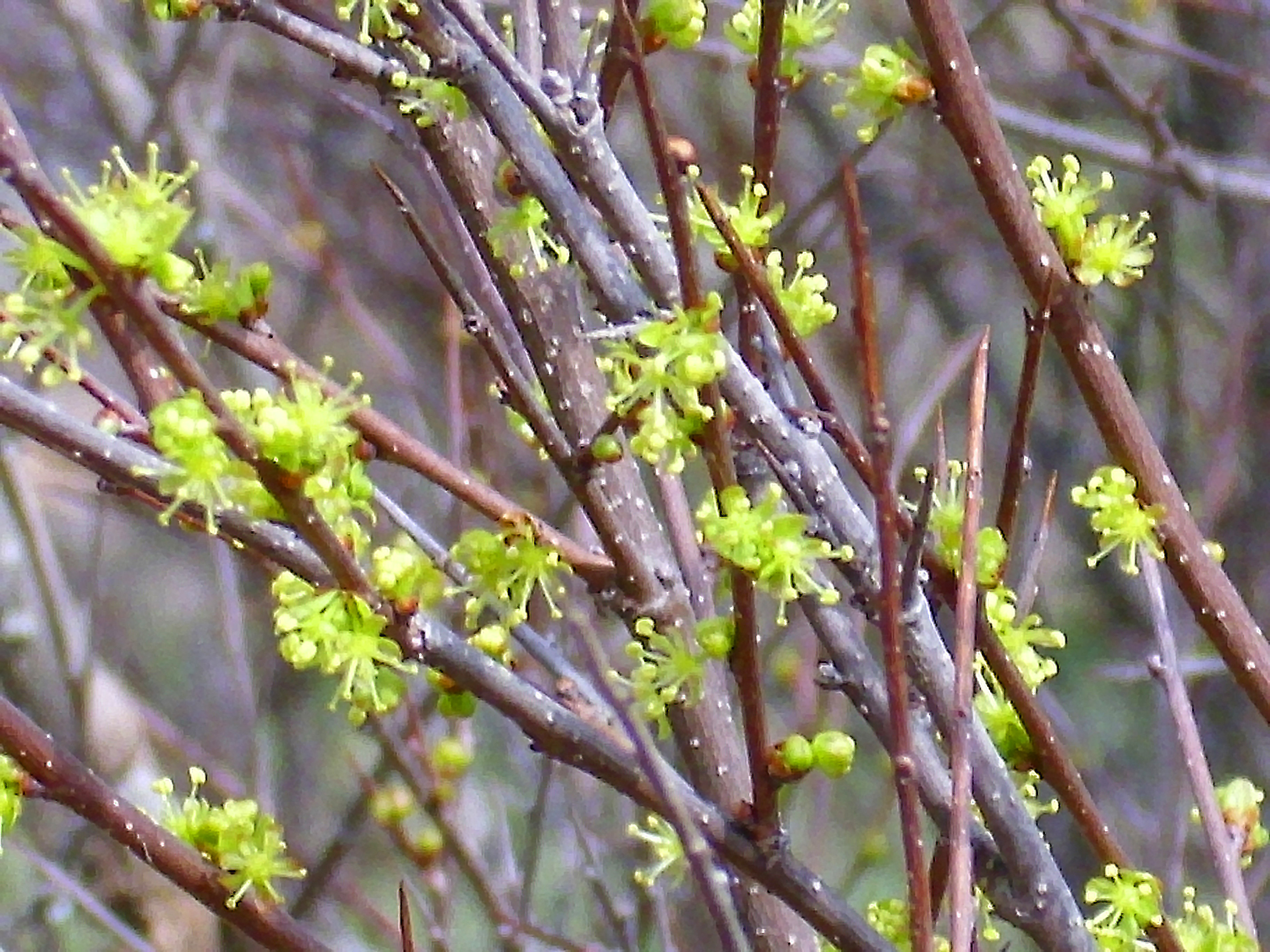
Inflorescence and spines

Flueggea tinctoria is a dioecious, deciduous shrub with up to 2 m (6 ft 7 in) in height, very branchy from the base. Branches are erect-patent, spinescent, cylindrical, smooth or warty, glabrous or puberulous and have short, small and thick hairs. Leaves are alternate and glabrous. Inflorescences have 2-4 (up to 6) fasciculate or solitary flowers, which are erect-patent in a male and sort of pendulous in the female; the pedicel of the male flowers is 2–6 mm (0.079–0.236 in) and in the female 5–8 mm (0.20–0.31 in). It has 5 to 8 very exerted stamens. Fruits are 3.5–4 mm (0.14–0.16 in) in diameter, subglobose, depressed, trisulcate; pedicel is up to 15 mm (0.59 in) long. Seeds are smooth, around 2 mm × 1.5 mm (0.079 in × 0.059 in) and convex on the back and flat laterally.

== Distribution and habitat ==
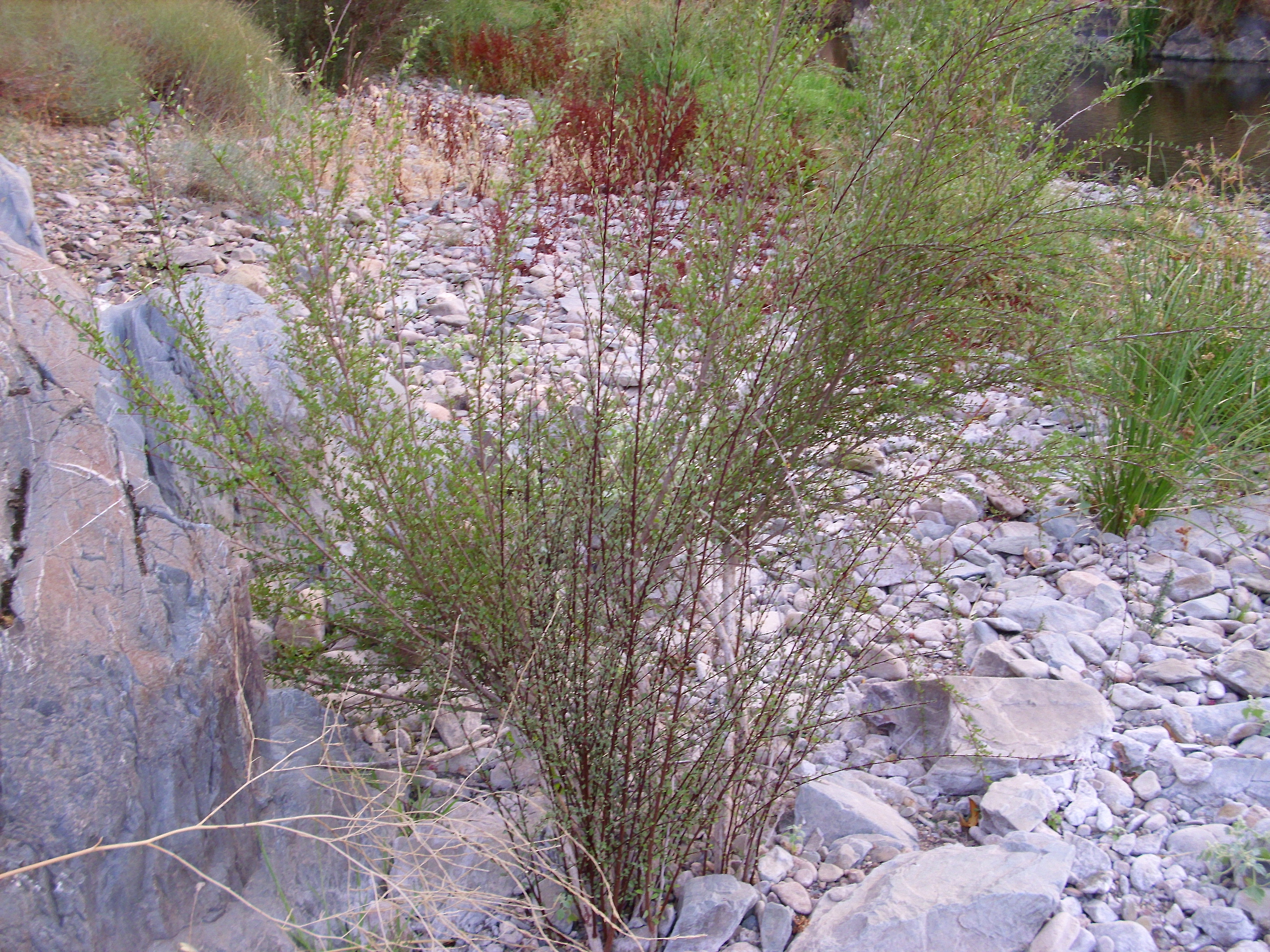
Habit

Flueggea tinctoria is native to the southwest quadrant of the Iberian Peninsula (inland Portugal and centralwestern-southwestern Spain), a good representative of the western Iberian sclerophyllous and semi-deciduous forests. It inhabits shrubby communities, on flood beds and torrential watercourses, on siliceous terrain, usually stony, from 20 to 200 m (66 to 656 ft) in altitude. It is especially dominant in the river basins of the Guadalquivir, Guadiana, Tagus and Douro.
