= Barbara D. Webster =

American botanist

Barbara Donahue Webster is an American botanist and professor emerita at the University of California, Davis. She is a past president of the Botanical Society of America, of which she also served as first female treasurer, and a fellow of both the American Association for the Advancement of Science and the American Society for Horticultural Science. She has served as editor of the journal Madroño.

In 2008 she was awarded the Distinguished Fellow of the Botanical Society of America, the society's highest honor.
