= Grady Webster =

Grady Linder Webster (1927–2005) was a plant systematist and taxonomist. He was the recipient of a number of awards and appointed to fellowships of botanical institutions in the United States of America. Webster's research included study of the diverse family Euphorbiaceae (spurges), on which he produced many papers, and he lectured on plant systematics, biogeography, and the ecology of pollination. Webster's career as a plant systematist was distinguished by the field research he undertook in remote tropical areas.

== Biography ==
Born in Ada, Oklahoma on 14 April 1927, his parents were Irena Lois Heard and Grady Webster, a newspaper publisher. His family moved to Austin, Texas during his childhood, and established a home amongst woodland. He worked within his father's business, which began an interest in world affairs, and gained an interest in plants during high school.

Webster served as an ensign in the navy whilst he was enrolled at Stanford University, and completed a bachelor's degree in botany at the University of Texas in 1949. He received a PhD while attending the University of Michigan under Rogers McVaugh and undertook a post doctoral fellowship at Harvard University that was provided by the National Science Foundation. At Harvard he worked with I. W. Bailey and was married to Barbara Anne Donahue, a Ph.D. studying plant morphology, in 1956.

An interest in the diverse Euphorbiaceae plant family inspired his field research, travelling to remote tropical and subtropical regions in Africa, South and Central America, the Caribbean, Australasia, and Europe. He contributed over 34000 specimens to herbaria around the world. He led an expedition to study the flora of a region known as the Maquipucuna Reserve in the Andes, publishing surveys and a book on the remarkable species diversity of its cloud forests.

Webster was appointed at the University of California, Davis, as a professor in the department of botany and the director of the arboretum.

The Grady L. Webster Award of the American Society of Plant Taxonomists (ASPT) and Botanical Society of America, named for their former president, is given annually and alternately to publications in either plant systematics or structural biology. During his lifetime he was awarded the Asa Gray and Merit awards of these societies. He received fellowships from Guggenheim, Smithsonian, and the National Science Foundation.
