= Chascotheca neopeltandra =

Scientific classification
- Kingdom: Plantae
- Clade: Tracheophytes
- Clade: Angiosperms
- Clade: Eudicots
- Clade: Rosids
- Order: Malpighiales
- Family: Phyllanthaceae
- Genus: Chascotheca
- Species: C. neopeltandra

Binomial name
- Chascotheca neopeltandra (Griseb.) Urb.

Synonyms
- Phyllanthus neopeltandrus Griseb.; Diasperus neopeltandrus (Griseb.) Kuntze; Chaenotheca neopeltandra (Griseb.) Urb.; Securinega neopeltandra (Griseb.) Urb. ex Pax & K.Hoffm.; Chaenotheca domingensis Urb.; Chascotheca domingensis (Urb.) Urb.

Species of plant

Chascotheca neopeltandra is a species of plants in the family Phyllanthaceae described as a species in 1904. It is native to the western Caribbean (Cuba, Hispaniola, Cayman Islands).
