= Gitara =

Conservation status
- Least Concern (IUCN 3.1)

Scientific classification
- Kingdom: Plantae
- Clade: Tracheophytes
- Clade: Angiosperms
- Clade: Eudicots
- Clade: Rosids
- Order: Malpighiales
- Family: Euphorbiaceae
- Subfamily: Acalyphoideae
- Tribe: Plukenetieae
- Subtribe: Tragiinae
- Genus: Gitara; Pax & K.Hoffm.
- Species: G. nicaraguensis

Binomial name
- Gitara nicaraguensis (Hemsl.) Card.-McTeag. & L.J.Gillespie

Synonyms
- Acidoton nicaraguensis (Hemsl.) G.L.Webster; Acidoton venezolanus (Pax & K.Hoffm.) G.L.Webster; Cleidion nicaraguense Hemsl.; Gitara panamensis Croizat; Gitara venezolana Pax & K.Hoffm.

Genus of flowering plants

Gitara is a genus of flowering plants in the family Euphorbiaceae. It includes a single species, Gitara nicaraguensis, a shrub or tree native to the tropical Americas. It ranges from Guatemala through Central America and northern South America to Bolivia and northern Brazil.

The species was first described as Cleidion nicaraguense by William Hemsley in 1883. In 2016 Warren M. Cardinal-McTeague and Lynn J. Gillespie placed the species in the newly-described genus Gitara as G. nicaraguensis.
