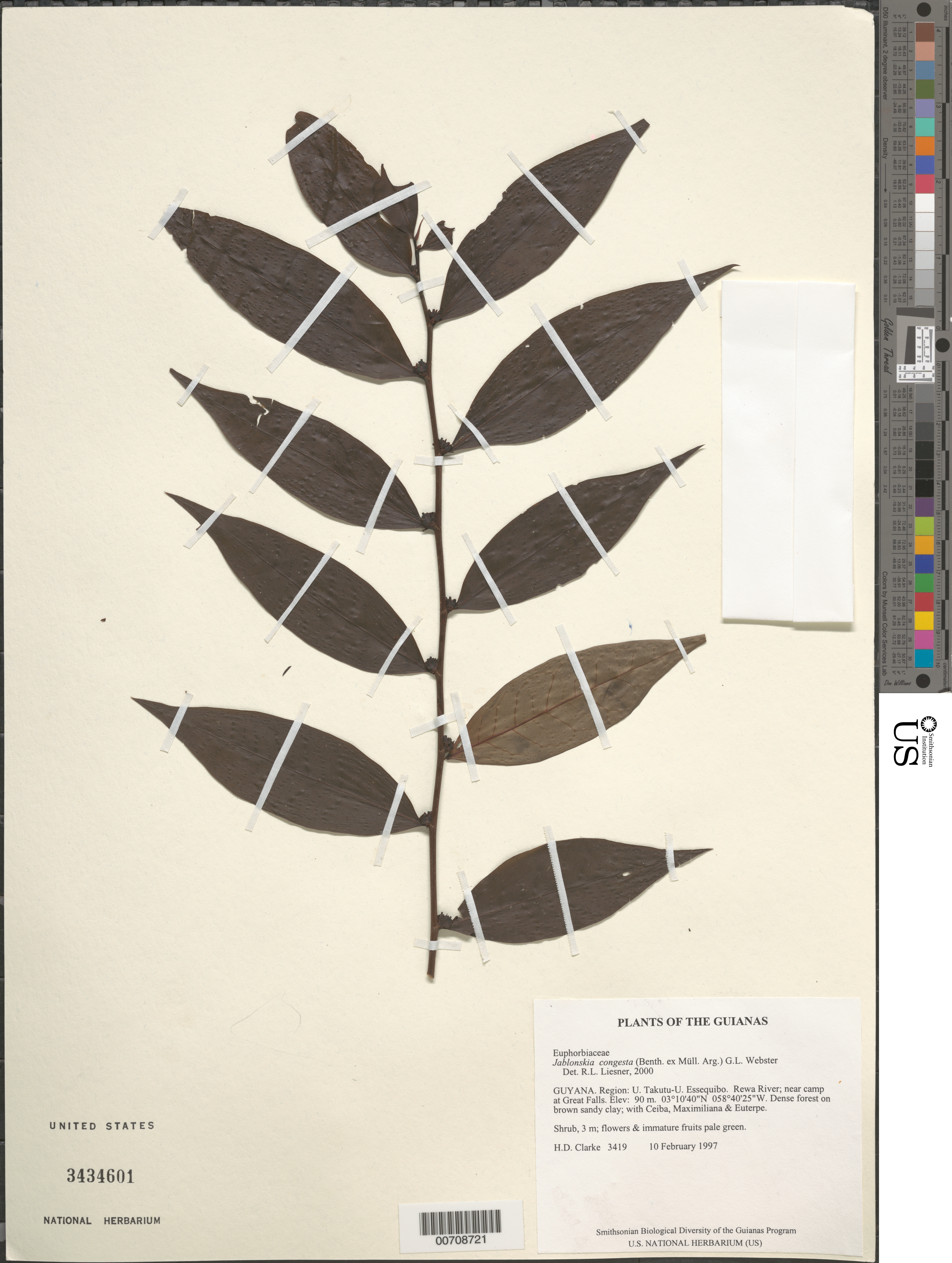

Scientific classification
- Kingdom: Plantae
- Clade: Tracheophytes
- Clade: Angiosperms
- Clade: Eudicots
- Clade: Rosids
- Order: Malpighiales
- Family: Phyllanthaceae
- Subfamily: Antidesmatoideae
- Tribe: Jablonskieae
- Genus: Jablonskia; G.L.Webster
- Species: J. congesta

Binomial name
- Jablonskia congesta (Benth. ex Müll.Arg.) G.L.Webster

= Jablonskia =

Genus of flowering plants

Jablonskia congesta is a species of flowering plant belonging to the family Phyllanthaceae. The genus Jablonskia is monotypic.

This species is found in northern South America.
