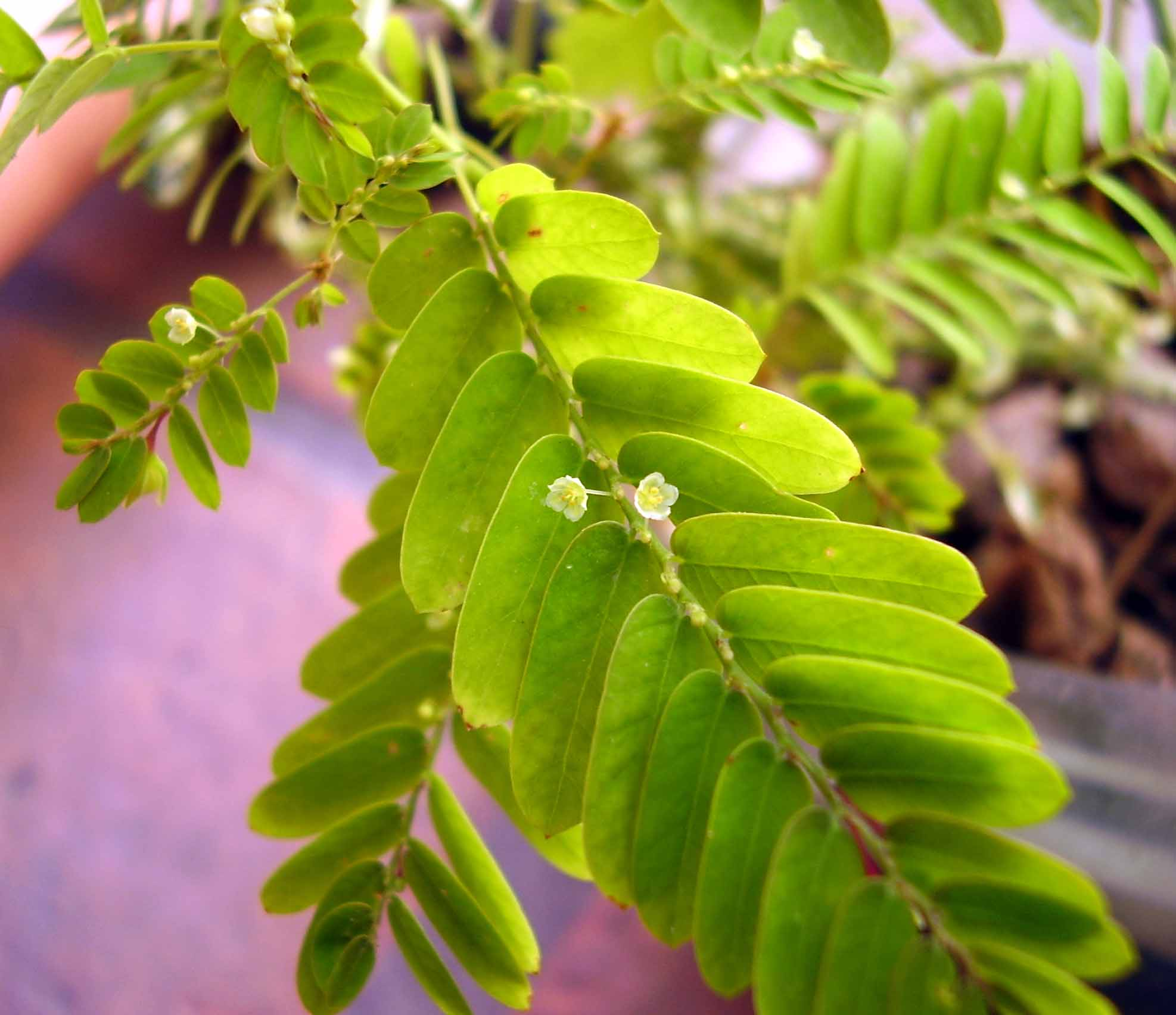

Scientific classification
- Kingdom: Plantae
- Clade: Embryophytes
- Clade: Tracheophytes
- Clade: Angiosperms
- Clade: Eudicots
- Clade: Rosids
- Order: Malpighiales
- Family: Phyllanthaceae
- Genus: Phyllanthus
- Species: P. niruri

Binomial name
- Phyllanthus niruri L.

Synonyms
- List: Diasperus chlorophaeus (Baill.) Kuntze; Diasperus lathyroides (Kunth) Kuntze; Diasperus microphyllus (Mart.) Kuntze; Diasperus niruri (L.) Kuntze; Diasperus rosellus (Müll.Arg.) Kuntze; Niruris annua Raf.; Niruris indica Raf.; Nymphanthus niruri (L.) Lour.; Phyllanthus carolinianus Blanco; Phyllanthus chlorophaeus Baill.; Phyllanthus ellipticus Buckley nom. illeg.; Phyllanthus erectus (Medik.) M.R.Almeida; Phyllanthus filiformis Pav. ex Baill.; Phyllanthus humilis Salisb.; Phyllanthus kirganelia Blanco; Phyllanthus lathyroides Kunth; Phyllanthus microphyllus Mart. nom. illeg.; Phyllanthus mimosoides Lodd. nom. illeg.; Phyllanthus moeroris Oken; Phyllanthus parvifolius Steud.; Phyllanthus purpurascens Kunth; Phyllanthus rosellus (Müll.Arg.) Müll.Arg.; Phyllanthus williamsii Standl.; Urinaria erecta Medik.

= Phyllanthus niruri =

Chanca piedra

Species of flowering plant

Phyllanthus niruri in the genus Phyllanthus of the family Phyllanthaceae is a widespread tropical plant commonly found in coastal areas from Texas southward through Mexico, Central America, and wide regions of South America and India. It has the common name chanca piedra among numerous others in Spanish.

== Description ==
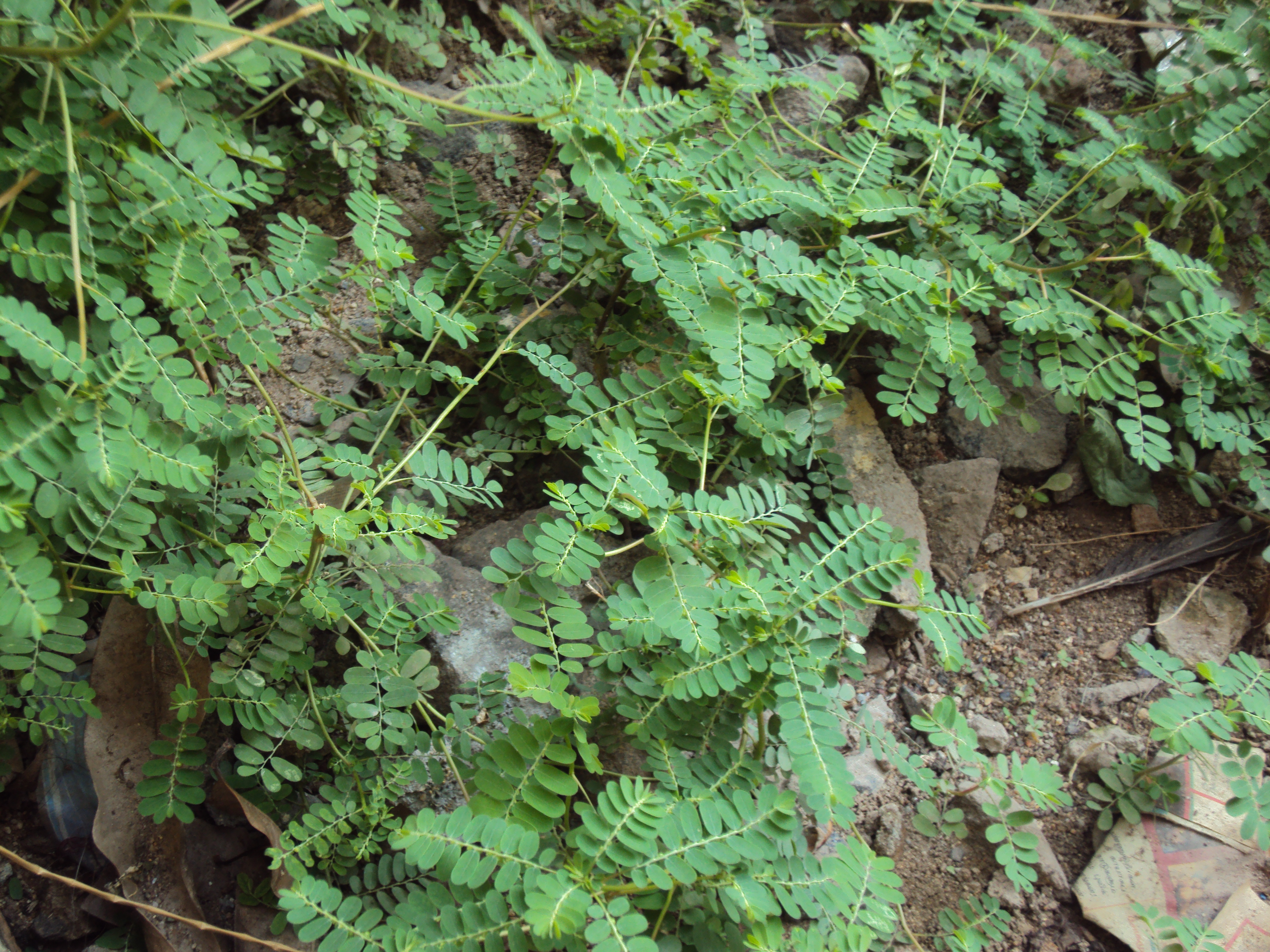
Phyllanthus niruri

It grows 50–70 cm (20–28 in) tall and bears ascending herbaceous branches. The bark is smooth and light green. It bears numerous pale green flowers which are often flushed with red. The fruits are tiny, smooth capsules containing seeds.

== Research ==
A 2011 Cochrane review found that there is "no convincing evidence that phyllanthus, compared with placebo, benefits people with chronic hepatitis B virus infection".

Extracts of the plant are marketed in herbal supplements with the claim of inhibiting kidney stone formation, although there is little evidence that such products are effective.

== Gallery ==
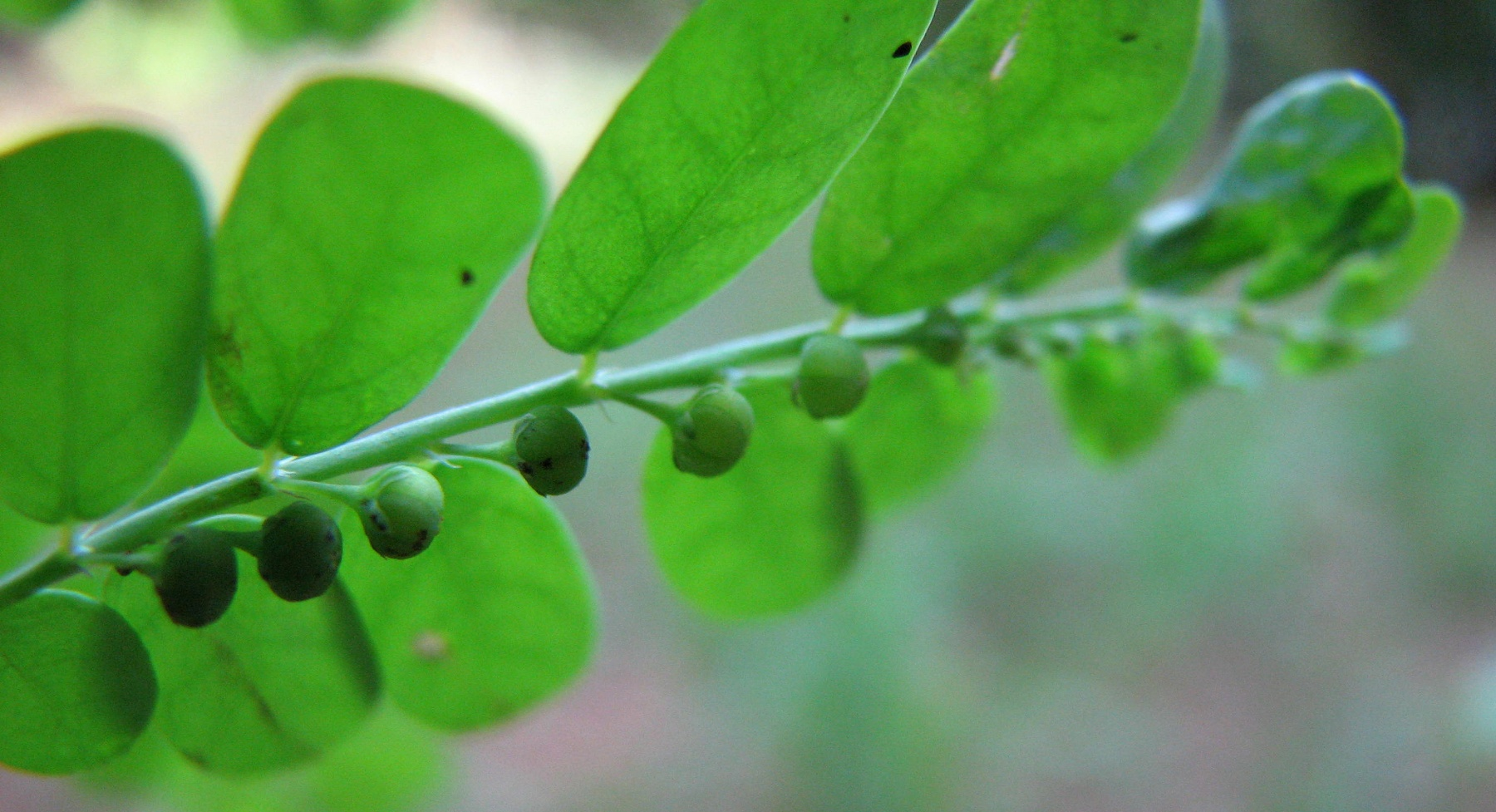
Niruri fruit

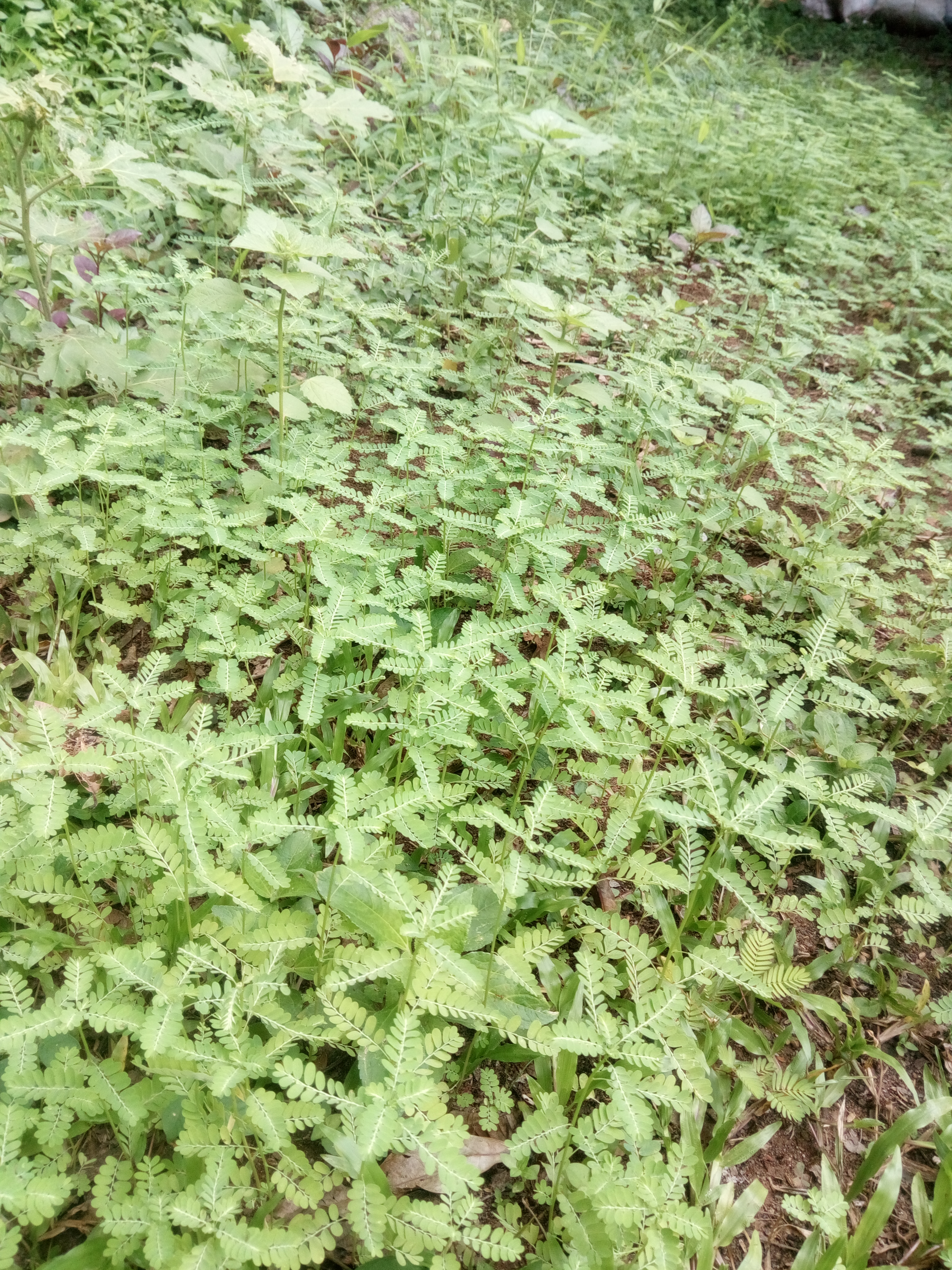
Niruri proliferation
