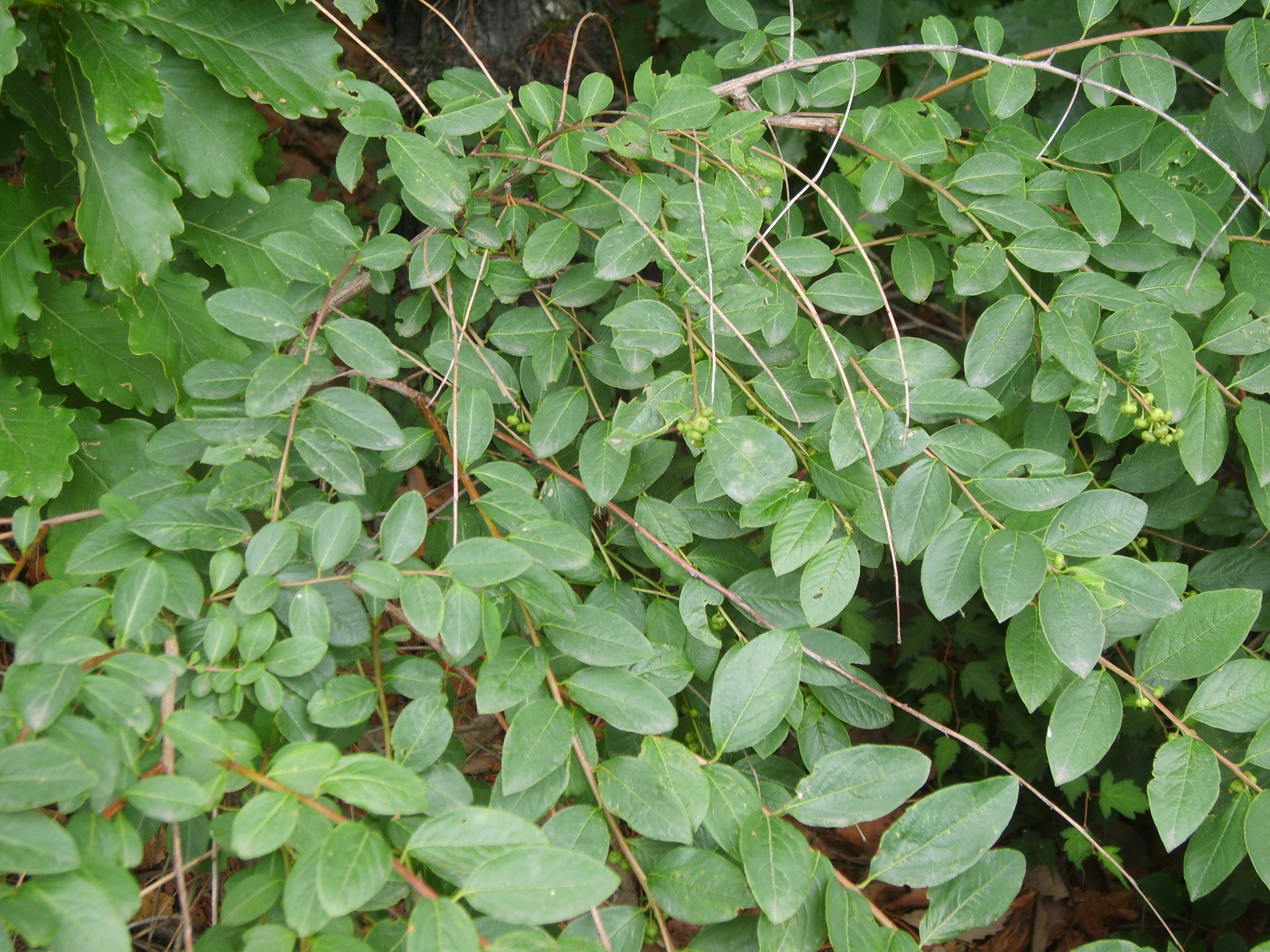

Scientific classification
- Kingdom: Plantae
- Clade: Embryophytes
- Clade: Tracheophytes
- Clade: Angiosperms
- Clade: Eudicots
- Clade: Rosids
- Order: Malpighiales
- Family: Phyllanthaceae
- Genus: Flueggea
- Species: F. suffruticosa

Binomial name
- Flueggea suffruticosa (Pall.) Baill.

Synonyms
- Pharnaceum suffruticosum Pall.; Securinega ramiflora Müll. Arg.; Securinega suffruticosa (Pall.) Rehder

= Flueggea suffruticosa =

Species of flowering plant

Flueggea suffruticosa is a species of flowering plant in the family Phyllanthaceae. It is a deciduous shrub that is native to East Asia. It is one of the 50 fundamental herbs used in traditional Chinese medicine, where it has the name yī yè qiū (Chinese: 一叶秋).

== Uses ==
=== Folk medicine ===
F. suffruticosa is one of the 50 fundamental herbs in traditional Chinese medicine, where its twigs and leaves are used for the treatment of lumbago, limb numbness, and indigestion. However, there is no scientific evidence that it has any clinical effect.

== Phytochemicals ==
Flueggea suffruticosa contains various alkaloids, such as securinine.
