= Flueggea elliptica =

Conservation status
- Critically Endangered (IUCN 3.1)

Scientific classification
- Kingdom: Plantae
- Clade: Tracheophytes
- Clade: Angiosperms
- Clade: Eudicots
- Clade: Rosids
- Order: Malpighiales
- Family: Phyllanthaceae
- Genus: Flueggea
- Species: F. elliptica

Binomial name
- Flueggea elliptica (Spreng.) Baill.

Synonyms
- Acidoton ellipticus (Spreng.) Kuntze; Diasperus rubellus (Müll.Arg.) Kuntze; Kirganelia elliptica Spreng. Phyllanthus ellipticus Kunth; Phyllanthus rubellus Müll.Arg. Securinega elliptica (Spreng.) Müll.Arg.

Species of flowering plant

Flueggea elliptica is a species of plant in the family Phyllanthaceae. It is endemic to Ecuador. Its natural habitat is subtropical or tropical moist lowland forests.
