= Flueggea flexuosa =

Conservation status
- Least Concern (IUCN 3.1)

Scientific classification
- Kingdom: Plantae
- Clade: Tracheophytes
- Clade: Angiosperms
- Clade: Eudicots
- Clade: Rosids
- Order: Malpighiales
- Family: Phyllanthaceae
- Genus: Flueggea
- Species: F. flexuosa

Binomial name
- Flueggea flexuosa Müll.Arg.

Synonyms
- Acidoton flexuosus (Müll.Arg.) Kuntze; Securinega flexuosa (Müll.Arg.) Müll.Arg.; Phyllanthus acuminatissimus C.B.Rob.; Securinega acuminatissima (C.B.Rob.) C.B.Rob.; Securinega samoana Croizat

Species of plant

Flueggea flexuosa is a species of flowering plant in the family Phyllanthaceae. It is native to the Philippines, Maluku Islands, Papuasia, Caroline Islands, Vanuatu, Fiji, Samoa, and Tonga, and it is classified under "least concern" by the IUCN. The wood of this plant is usually used as building materials particularly as rafter, house post or agricultural implements. In the Philippines, this plant is locally known as anislag, tras or malagau.

Mainly found on low elevation, the plant's height can reach from 10 to 20 meters (33 to 66 ft) and its diameter at breast height measures 2,040 centimetres (800 inches). The leaves of this plant are alternate, elliptic or oblong with length ranging from 10 to 16 centimeters (3.9 to 6.3 inches) and width ranging from 4 to 6 centimeters (1.6 to 2.4 inches).

In Republic Act No. 370 of the Philippines that became a law on June 14, 1949, this plant, the anislag, is mentioned as being in the third group on the grouping of trees in the context of managing of trees according to the revised Administrative Code.
