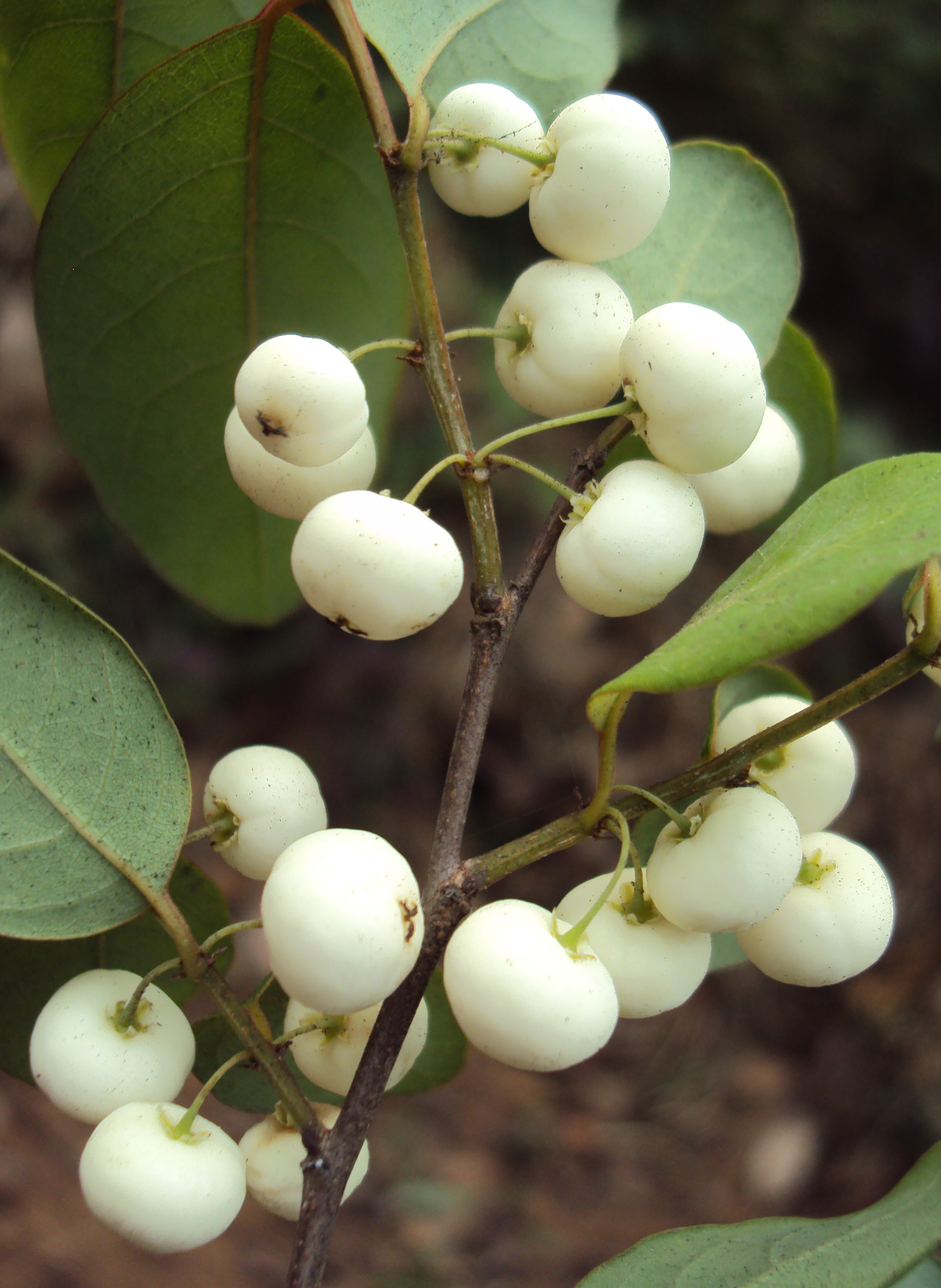
- From Kerala, India.

Conservation status
- Least Concern (IUCN 3.1)

Scientific classification
- Kingdom: Plantae
- Clade: Tracheophytes
- Clade: Angiosperms
- Clade: Eudicots
- Clade: Rosids
- Order: Malpighiales
- Family: Phyllanthaceae
- Genus: Flueggea
- Species: F. leucopyrus

Binomial name
- Flueggea leucopyrus Willd.

Synonyms
- Acidoton leucopyrus (Willd.) Kuntze; Cicca leucopyrus (Willd.) Kuntze; Flueggea wallichiana Baill., nom. illeg.; Flueggea xerocarpa A.Juss.; Phyllanthus albicans Benth., nom. nud.; Phyllanthus leucopyrus (Willd.) J.Koenig ex Roxb.; Phyllanthus lucena B.Heyne ex Roth; Securinega leucopyrus (Willd.) Müll.Arg.; Xylophylla lucena Roth

= Flueggea leucopyrus =

Species of tree

Flueggea leucopyrus is a species of shrub or tree. It primarily grows in wet tropical biomes. Its common names include Indian snowberry, white honey shrub, bushweed, and cool pot.

== Names ==
Flueggea leucopyrus is known by the following names:

- Telugu: Pulugudu (పులుగుడు) or Tella Pulugudu (తెల్ల పులుగుడు)
- Kannada: Bili sooli gida (ಬಿಳಿ ಸೂಳಿ ಗಿಡ) or just Sooli (ಸೂಳಿ)
- Tamil: Varat-pula (வறட்பூலா), Vellai-p-pulanci (ள்ளைப்பூலாஞ்சி), Vellaipoola (வெள்ளை பூலை), Madhuppullaanthi (மதுபிபுல்லாந்தி) or Pulanji (புலஞ்சி)
- Malaylam: Amboorippachila (അമ്പൂരിപ്പച്ചില), Mulpulanji (മുൾപ്പുല്ലാഞ്ഞി), Perimklavu (പെരിംക്ലാവ്), Vellamullaram (വെള്ളമുള്ളാരം) or Cerimklaav (ചെരിംക്ലാവ്)
- Konkani: Parpo
- Sanskrit: Panduphali (पान्डुफली), Bhuriphali (भूरिफली) or Shwetakambuja (श्वेतकम्बुज)
- Marathi: Pandharphali (पांढरफळी)
- Sinhala: Katupila (කටුපිල)
- Gujarati: Thunmari(ઠુંમરી), Shinavi(શીંણવી)

== Description ==
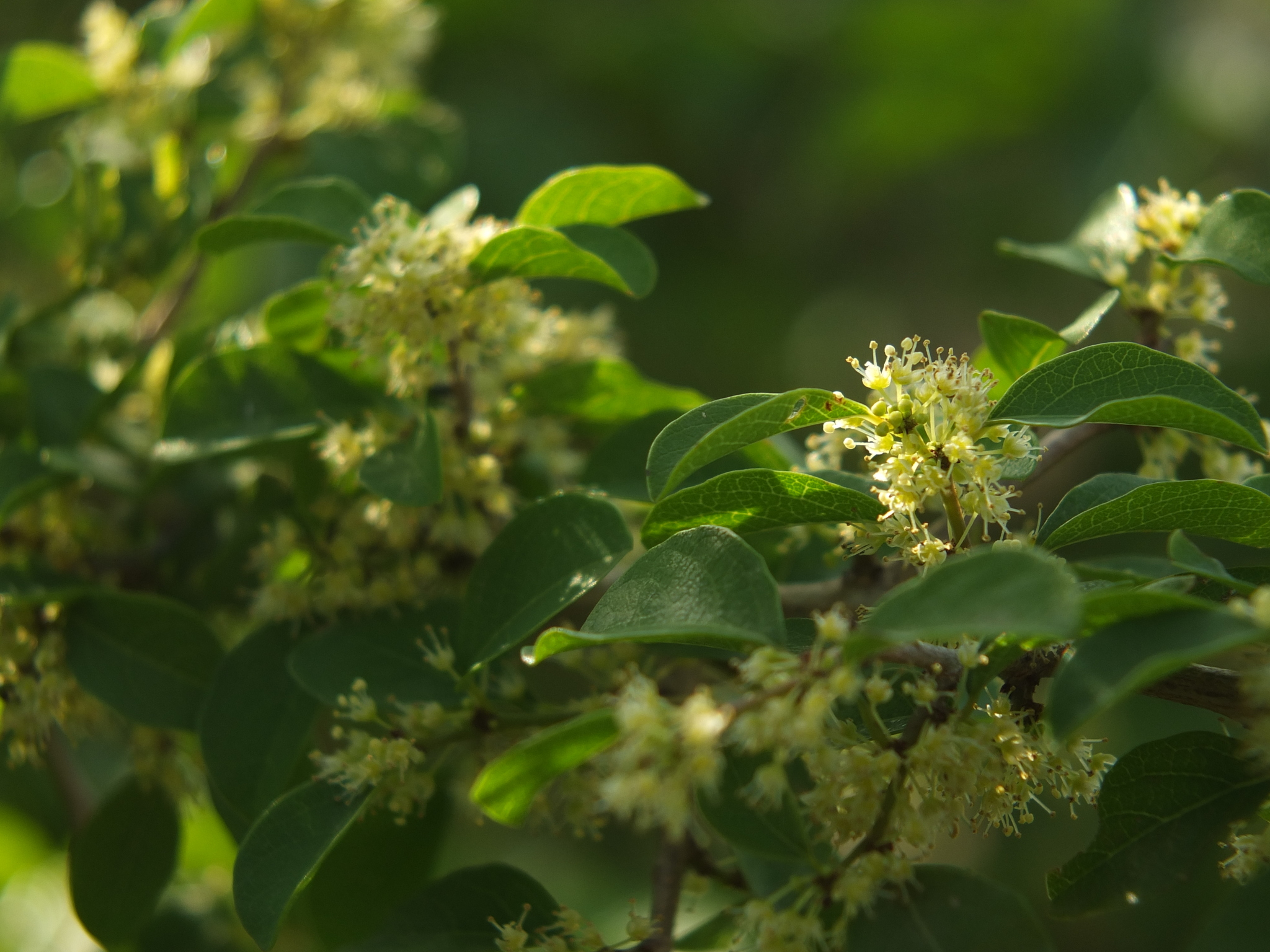
View from Karnataka, India.

Flueggea leucopyrus is an erect, many-branched shrub growing up to 5 m tall. Its angular branchlets end in sharp spines. Its leaves are alternate, obovate to elliptic, and measure up to 2.5 cm long and 1.5 cm wide. Male flowers are greenish-yellow and clustered in axillary fascicles, while female flowers are solitary. The male flowers have five perianth lobes, with five free stamens and a disc of five glands alternating with the stamens. The fruits are globose, about 5 mm across, three-celled, and white when ripe. The seeds are trigonous, smooth, and pale brown.

== Distribution and habitat ==
The native range of Flueggea leucopyrus includes parts of East Africa, South Asia and Southeast Asia. The species can be found in Ethiopia, Somalia, Socotra, Sajid Island, Pakistan, India, Sri Lanka, Bangladesh, Myanmar, and China (Sichuan, Yunnan). It is commonly found on foothills in scrub forests and in dry deciduous forests at elevations of 0 to 900 m.

== Ecology ==
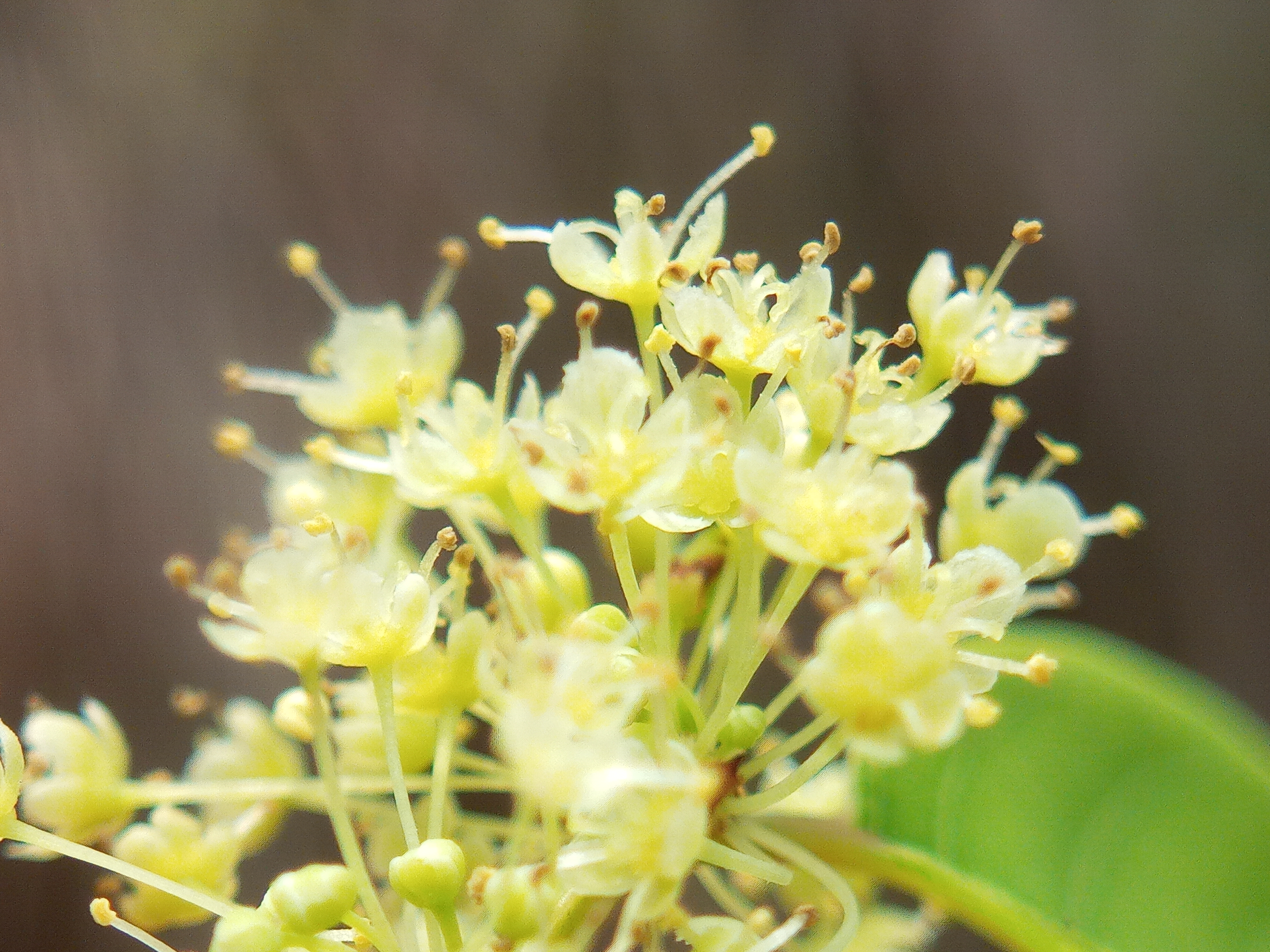
Flower of F. leucopyrus

Flueggea leucopyrus flowers from February to May and is pollinated by honey bees. The fruiting period is April to November. The plant is eaten by goats.

== Uses ==
Its fruits are edible.

Juice or paste of the leaves of Flueggea leucopyrus is used alongside tobacco to eradicate worms in sores. It has been used in Ayurveda and folk medicine, especially in Sri Lankan folk medicine, where it is used in the management of acute and chronic types of wounds. F. leucopyrus is used as an antifungal against Aspergillus. F. leucopyrus shows potential anti-inflammatory effects against protein denaturation and proteinase inhibitors, possibly due to flavonoids and polyphenols. Further research is needed to identify active components and their mechanisms of action.

Extracts from F. leucopyrus possess antioxidant properties, with the most significant effects observed in chloroform and alcohol extracts. These extracts showed a dose-dependent increase in antioxidant activity, with percentages of 82.5% and 88.4% respectively. Flavanoids, alkaloids, tannins, and steroids present in the extracts are believed to be responsible for this scavenging activity. Alcohol extracts were the most effective, followed by chloroform extracts, then ethyl acetate extracts, then hydro-alcohol extracts, then hexane extracts. This antioxidant activity was attributed to the reduction of the stable radical DPPH by the chemical constituents of the plant, which act as hydrogen donors.

The decoction of aerial parts of F. leucopyrus shows cytotoxic effects on breast cancer cells, particularly Her2 negative cells (MCF-7 and MDA-MB-231), compared to Her2 positive (SKBR-3) and non-cancerous cells (MCF-10A). This supports its traditional use for its anticancer properties.

Young branches of F. leucopyrus have been used as brooms by the aboriginal inhabitants of the Nilgiri Biosphere Reserve within the Western Ghats region of India.
