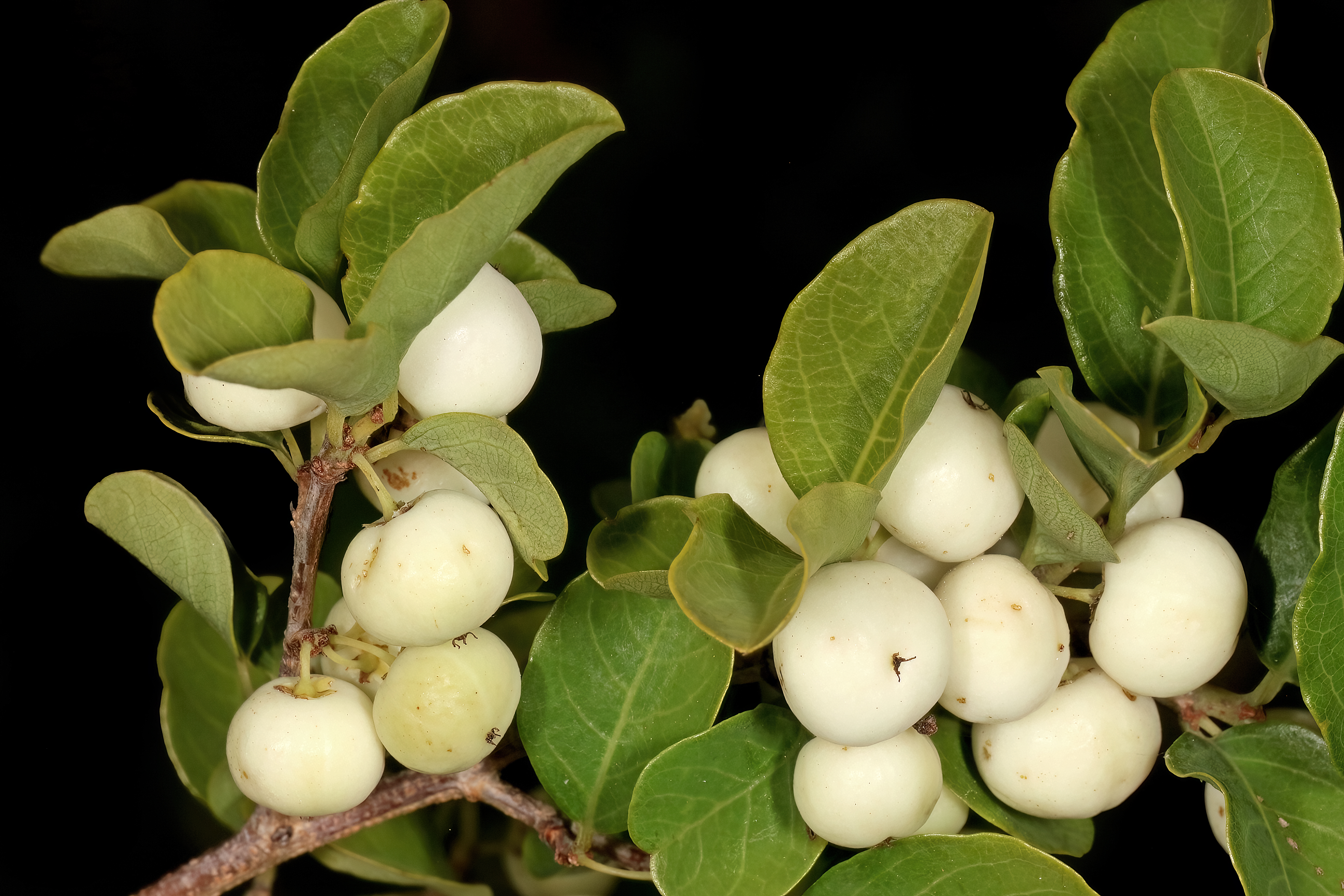
- Berries
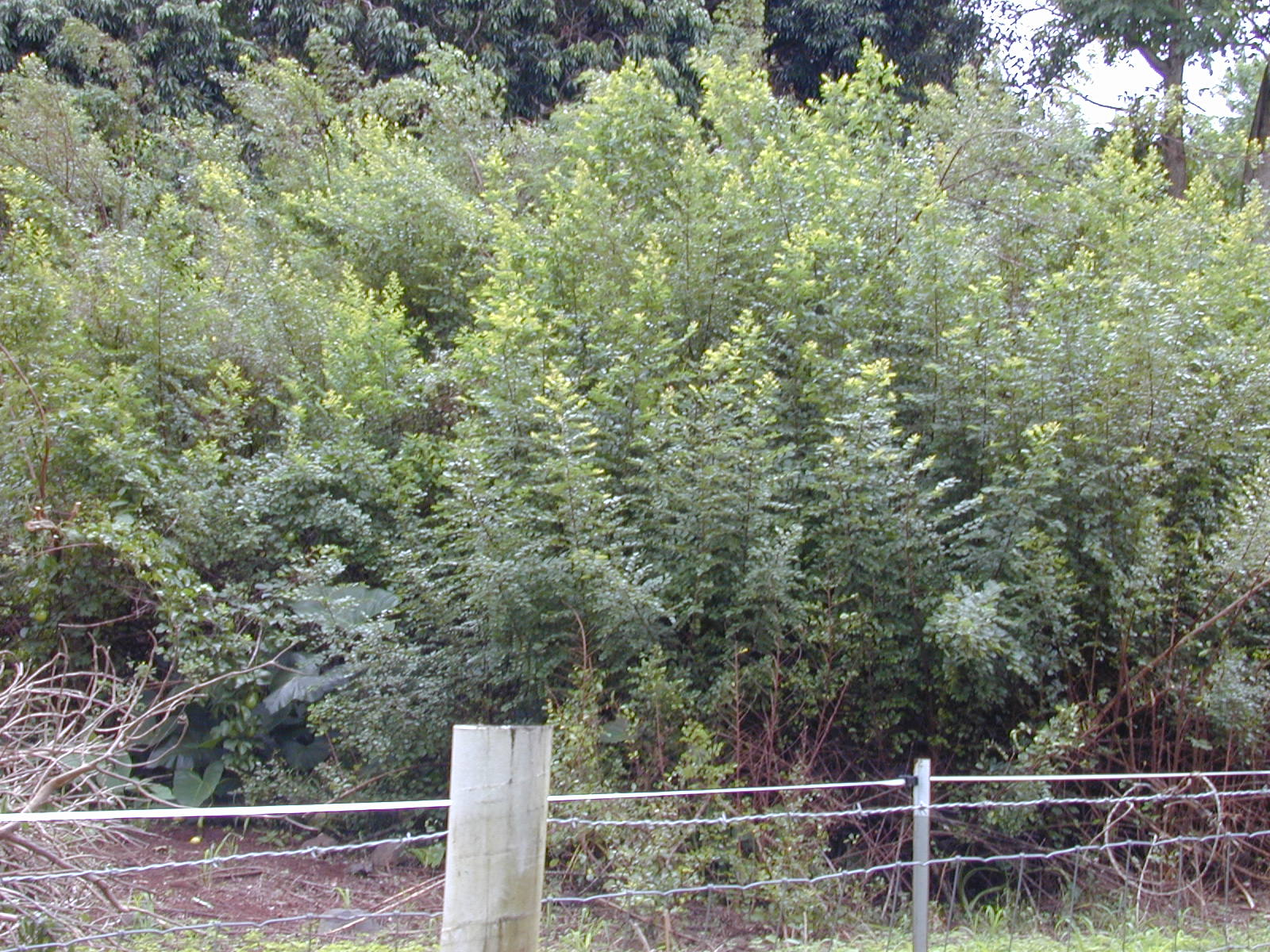
- A thicket

Conservation status
- Least Concern (IUCN 3.1)

Scientific classification
- Kingdom: Plantae
- Clade: Tracheophytes
- Clade: Angiosperms
- Clade: Eudicots
- Clade: Rosids
- Order: Malpighiales
- Family: Phyllanthaceae
- Genus: Flueggea
- Species: F. virosa

Binomial name
- Flueggea virosa (Roxb. ex Willd.) Royle

Synonyms
- List: Acidoton griseus (Müll.Arg.) Kuntze; Acidoton obovatus (Willd.) Kuntze; Acidoton phyllanthoides (Baill.) Kuntze; Acidoton virosus (Roxb. ex Willd.) Kuntze; Bessera inermis Spreng.; Bradleia dioica (Schumach. & Thonn.) Gaertn. ex Vahl; Cicca obovata (Willd.) Kurz; Cicca pentandra Blanco; Conami portoricensis (Kuntze) Britton; Diasperus hamrur (Forssk.) Kuntze; Diasperus portoricensis Kuntze; Drypetes bengalensis Spreng.; Flueggea abyssinica (A.Rich.) Baill.; Flueggea angulata (Schumach. & Thonn.) Schrank; Flueggea keyensis (Warb.) Boerl.; Flueggea melanthesoides (F.Muell.) F.Muell.; Flueggea microcarpa Blume; Flueggea novoguineensis Valeton ex Hallier f.; Flueggea obovata (Willd.) Wall. ex Fern.-Vill.; Flueggea obovata var. luxurians A.Chev. ex Beille; Flueggea ovalis Baill.; Flueggea phyllanthoides Baill.; Flueggea retusa Voigt; Flueggea senensis Klotzsch; Flueggea virosa var. aridicola Domin; Flueggea virosa f. reticulata Domin; Leptonema melanthesoides F.Muell.; Phyllanthus angulatus Schumach. & Thonn.; Phyllanthus dioicus Schumach. & Thonn.; Phyllanthus hamrur Forssk.; Phyllanthus leucophyllus Strachey & Winterb. ex Baill.; Phyllanthus lucidus Steud.; Phyllanthus obtusus Schrank; Phyllanthus polygamus Hochst. ex A.Rich.; Phyllanthus portoricensis (Kuntze) Urb.; Phyllanthus reichenbachianus Sieber ex Baill.; Phyllanthus retusus Roxb.; Phyllanthus virosus Roxb. ex Willd.; Rumea inermis DC.; Securinega abyssinica A.Rich.; Securinega grisea Müll.Arg.; Securinega keyensis Warb.; Securinega leucopyrus Brandis; Securinega melanthesoides (F.Muell.) Airy Shaw; Securinega melanthesoides var. aridicola (Domin) Airy Shaw; Securinega microcarpa (Blume) Müll.Arg.; Securinega obovata (Willd.) Müll.Arg.; Securinega virosa (Roxb. ex Willd.) Baill.; Securinega virosa var. australiana Baill.; Xylophylla obovata Willd.

= Flueggea virosa =

Species of plant

Flueggea virosa, the common bushweed, simpleleaf bushweed (a name it shares with Flueggea acidoton), white-berry bush, snowberry tree (a name it shares with Symphoricarpos albus), or Chinese waterberry, is a widespread species of flowering plant in the family Phyllanthaceae. It is native to the Old World tropics and subtropics; Africa, Madagascar and other Indian Ocean islands, the Arabian Peninsula, the Indian Subcontinent, southern China, Southeast Asia, Malesia, New Guinea, and Australia. It has also been introduced to Florida and Puerto Rico. Dispersed by birds, it has been assessed as Least Concern.

A deciduous shrub or tree reaching 6 m (20 ft), it is found in the seasonally dry tropics and subtropics (and is absent from true deserts and rainforests) at elevations from 100 to 2,300 m (300 to 7,500 ft). Its white berries are edible.

== Subtaxa ==
The following subspecies are accepted:

- Flueggea virosa subsp. himalaica D.G.Long – Nepal, eastern Himalayas, Assam, Myanmar
- Flueggea virosa subsp. melanthesoides (F.Muell.) G.L.Webster – New Guinea, Australia
- Flueggea virosa subsp. virosa – entire range, except Nepal, eastern Himalayas, New Guinea, Australia
