= List of Picrodendraceae genera =

As the family Picrodendraceae is erected from the bases of subfamily Oldfieldioideae, its taxonomy remains the same:

== Tribe Caletieae ==
There are 4 subtribes and 13 genera:

Subtribe Dissiliariinae

Austrobuxus (also Buraeavia, Bureaua, Canaca, Choriophyllum)
Choriceras
Dissiliaria
Longetia
Sankowskya
Whyanbeelia

Subtribe Hyaenanchinae

Hyaenanche (also Toxicodendrum)

Subtribe Petalostigmatinae

Petalostigma (also Xylococcus)

Subtribe Pseudanthinae

Kairothamnus
Micrantheum (also Allenia, Caletia)
Neoroepera
Pseudanthus (also Chorizotheca, Chrysostemon, Stachystemon)
Scagea

== Tribe Picrodendreae ==
There are 3 subtribes and 8 genera:

Subtrible Mischodontinae

Androstachys
Aristogeitonia (also Paragelonium)
Mischodon
Stachyandra
Voatamalo

Subtribe Paiveusinae

Oldfieldia (also Cecchia, Paivaeusa)

Subtribe Picrodendrinae

Parodiodendron
Picrodendron
Piranhea (also Celaenodendron)

== Tribe Podocalyceae ==
This tribe has 3 subtribes and 3 genera:

Subtribe Paradrypetinae

Paradrypetes - moved to Rhizophoraceae

Subtribe Tetracoccinae

Tetracoccus (also Halliophytum)

Subtribe Podocalycinae

Podocalyx

== Incertae sedis ==
Tacarcuna

== See also ==
- Taxonomy of the Euphorbiaceae
- Taxonomy of the Phyllanthaceae
