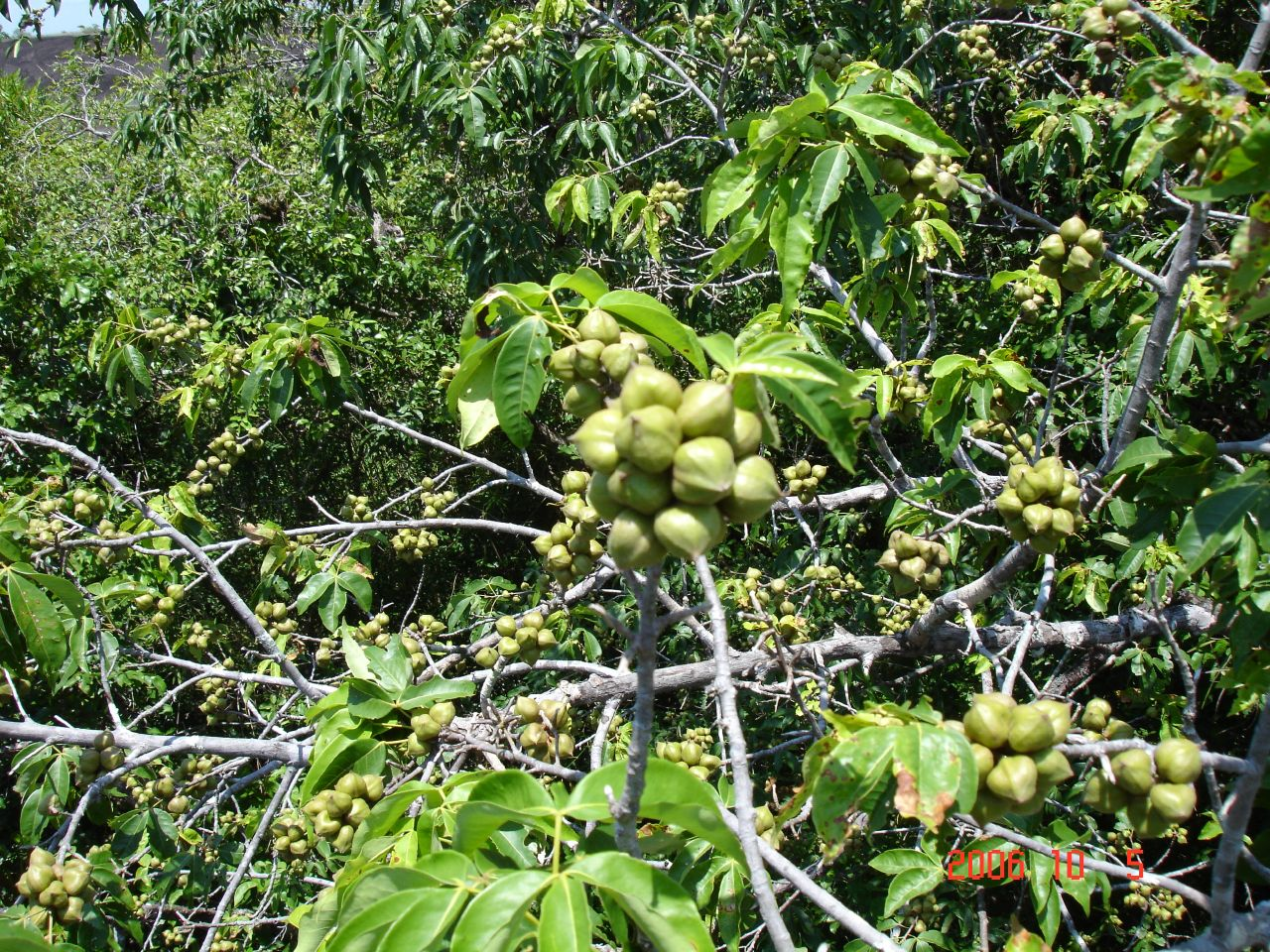
- Piranhea trifoliata

Scientific classification
- Kingdom: Plantae
- Clade: Tracheophytes
- Clade: Angiosperms
- Clade: Eudicots
- Clade: Rosids
- Order: Malpighiales
- Family: Picrodendraceae
- Tribe: Picrodendreae

Subtribes and genera
- Subtrible Mischodontinae Androstachys Aristogeitonia (also Paragelonium) Mischodon Stachyandra Voatamalo Subtribe Paiveusinae Oldfieldia (also Cecchia, Paivaeusa) Subtribe Picrodendrinae Parodiodendron Picrodendron Piranhea (also Celaenodendron)

= Picrodendreae =

Tribe of flowering plants

The Picrodendreae is a tribe of plants under the family Picrodendraceae. It comprises 3 subtribes and 8 genera.

== See also ==
- Taxonomy of the Picrodendraceae
