= Aristogeiton =

Aristogeiton (Ancient Greek: Ἀριστογείτων) was the name of two eminent Athenian citizens:

- Aristogeiton the Tyrannicide, who assassinated Hipparchus in 514 BC; see Harmodius and Aristogeiton
- Aristogeiton (orator), orator who opposed Dinarchus and Demosthenes
- Aristogeiton (sculptor), statuary from Thebes

== See also ==
- Aristogeitonia, plant genus
