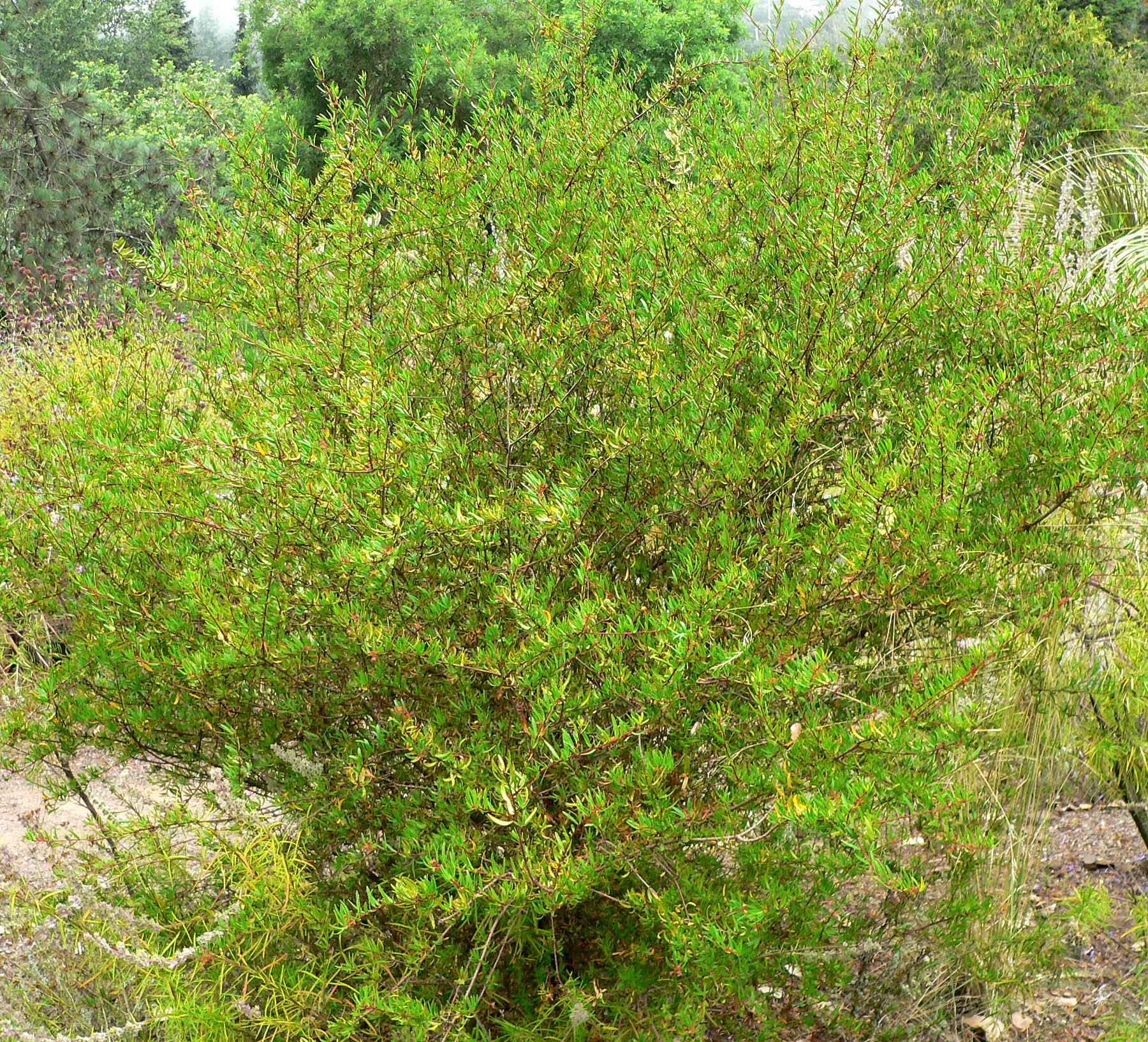

Scientific classification
- Kingdom: Plantae
- Clade: Tracheophytes
- Clade: Angiosperms
- Clade: Eudicots
- Clade: Rosids
- Order: Malpighiales
- Family: Picrodendraceae
- Tribe: Podocalyceae; G.L.Webster

Subtribes and genera
- Subtribe Paradrypetinae Paradrypetes Subtribe Tetracoccinae Tetracoccus (also Halliophytum) Subtribe Podocalycinae Podocalyx

= Podocalyceae =

Tribe of flowering plants

The Podocalyceae is a tribe of plants under the family Picrodendraceae. It comprises 3 subtribes and 3 genera.

== See also ==
- Taxonomy of the Picrodendraceae
