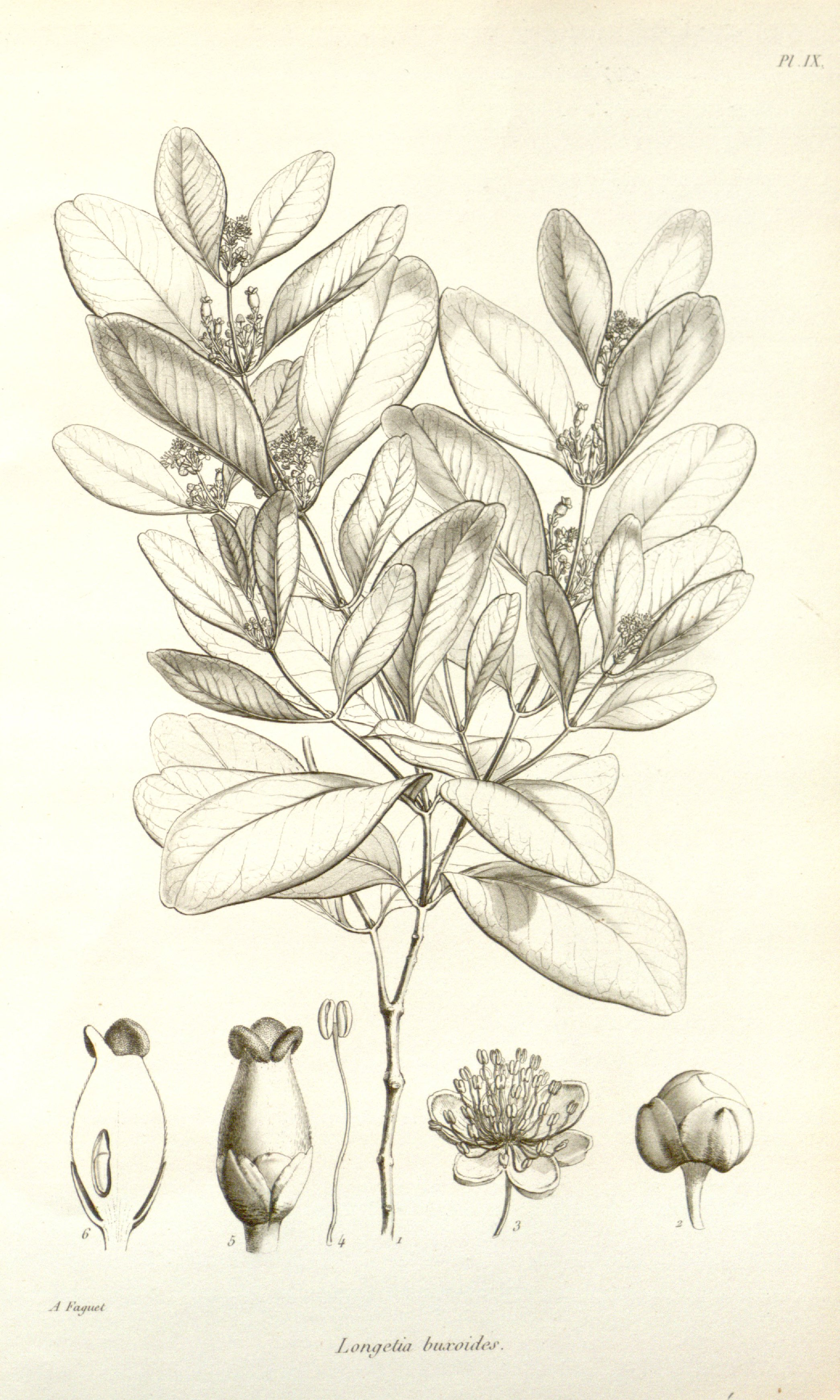
- Longetia buxoides

Scientific classification
- Kingdom: Plantae
- Clade: Tracheophytes
- Clade: Angiosperms
- Clade: Eudicots
- Clade: Rosids
- Order: Malpighiales
- Family: Picrodendraceae
- Tribe: Caletieae
- Subtribe: Dissiliariinae
- Genus: Longetia; Baill.
- Species: L. buxoides

Binomial name
- Longetia buxoides Baill.

Synonyms
- Austrobuxus buxoides (Baill.) Airy Shaw; Austrobuxus gracilis Airy Shaw; Austrobuxus pisocarpus Airy Shaw

= Longetia =

Genus of flowering plants

Longetia is a genus of plants under the family Picrodendraceae first described as a genus in 1866. It has only one known species, Longetia buxoides, endemic to New Caledonia.

formerly included

moved to other genera: Austrobuxus Scagea

1. L. carunculata - Austrobuxus carunculatus
2. L. clusiacea - Austrobuxus clusiaceus
3. L. depauperata - Scagea depauperata
4. L. eugeniifolia - Austrobuxus eugeniifolius
5. L. gynotricha - Scagea oligostemon
6. L. malayana - Austrobuxus nitidus
7. L. montana - Austrobuxus nitidus
8. L. nitida - Austrobuxus nitidus
9. L. swainii - Austrobuxus swainii

== See also ==
- Taxonomy of the Picrodendraceae
