= Natural history of Africa =

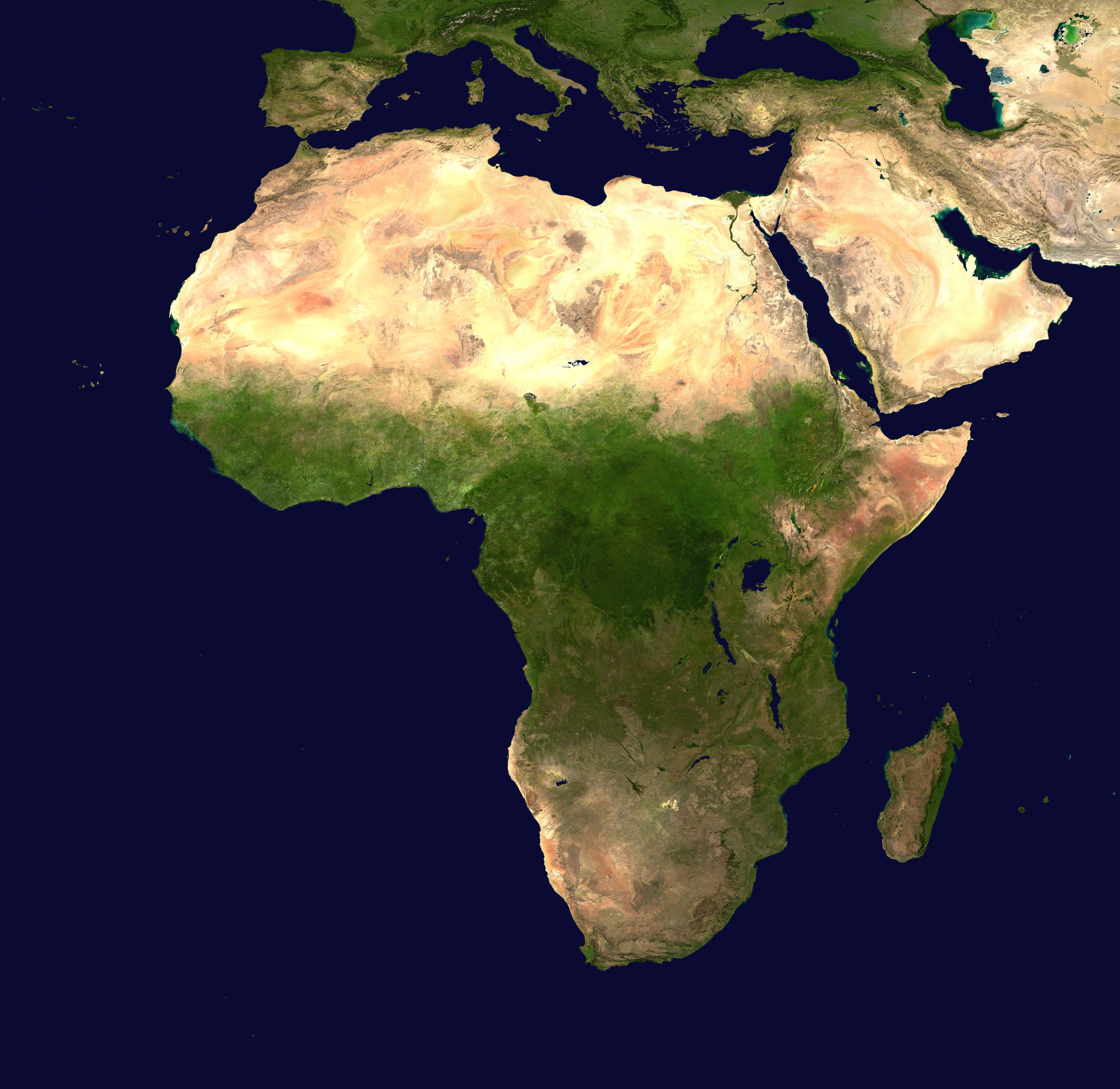
A composite satellite image of Africa.

Africa map of Köppen climate classification.

The natural history of Africa encompasses some of the well-known megafauna of that continent.

Natural history is the study and description of organisms and natural objects, especially their origins, evolution, and interrelationships.

== Flora ==
The vegetation of Africa follows very closely the distribution of heat and moisture. The northern and southern temperate zones have a flora distinct from that of the continent generally, which is tropical. In the countries bordering the Mediterranean, there are groves of orange and olive trees, evergreen oaks, cork trees and pines, intermixed with cypresses, myrtles, arbutus and fragrant tree-heaths.

South of the Atlas Mountains, the conditions alter. The zones of minimum rainfall have a very scanty flora, consisting of plants adapted to resist the great dryness. Characteristic of the Sahara is the date palm, which flourishes where other vegetation can scarcely maintain existence, while in the semidesert regions the acacia, from which gum arabic is obtained, is abundant.

The more humid regions have a richer vegetation; dense forest where the rainfall is greatest and variations of temperature least, conditions found chiefly on the tropical coasts, and in the west African equatorial basin with its extension towards the upper Nile; and savanna interspersed with trees on the greater part of the plateaus, passing as the desert regions are approached into a scrub vegetation consisting of thorny acacias, etc. Forests also occur on the humid slopes of mountain ranges up to a certain elevation. In the coast regions, the typical tree is the mangrove, which flourishes wherever the soil is of a swamp character.

The dense forests of West Africa contain, in addition to a great variety of hardwoods, two palms, Elaeis guineensis (oil palm) and Raphia vinifera (bamboo palm), not found, generally speaking, in the savanna regions. Bombax or silk cotton trees attain gigantic proportions in the forests, which are the home of the India rubber-producing plants and of many valuable kinds of timber trees, such as odum (Chlorophora excelsa), ebony, mahogany (Khaya senegalensis), Oldfieldia (Oldfieldia africana) and camwood (Baphia nitida). The climbing plants in the tropical forests are exceedingly luxuriant and the undergrowth or "bush" is extremely dense.

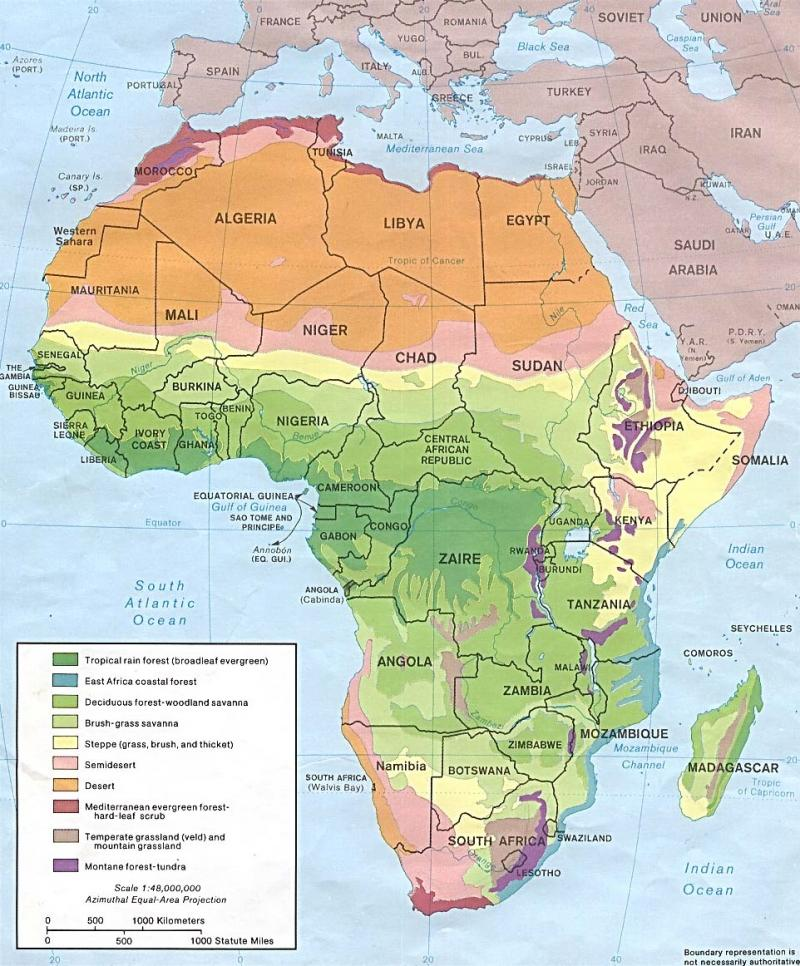
A map of Africa's vegetation variation.

In the savannas the most characteristic trees are the monkey-bread tree or baobab (Adansonia digitata), doum palm (Hyphaene) and euphorbias. The coffee plant grows wild in such widely separated places as Liberia and southern Ethiopia. The higher mountains have a special flora showing close agreement over wide intervals of space, as well as affinities with the mountain flora of the eastern Mediterranean, the Himalaya and Indo-China.

In the swamp regions of north-east Africa, papyrus and associated plants, including the soft-wooded ambach, flourished in immense quantities, and little else is found in the way of vegetation. South Africa is largely destitute of forest, save in the lower valleys and coast regions. Tropical flora disappears, and in the semi-desert plains the fleshy, leafless, contorted species of kapsias, mesembryanthemums, aloes and other succulent plants make their appearance. There are, too, valuable timber trees, such as the yellowwood (Podocarpus elongatus), stinkwood (Ocotea), sneezewood or Cape ebony (Pteroxylon utile) and ironwood. Extensive miniature woods of heaths are found in almost endless variety and covered throughout the greater part of the year with innumerable blossoms in which red is very prevalent. Of the grasses of Africa, alfa is very abundant in the plateaus of the Atlas range.

== Fauna ==
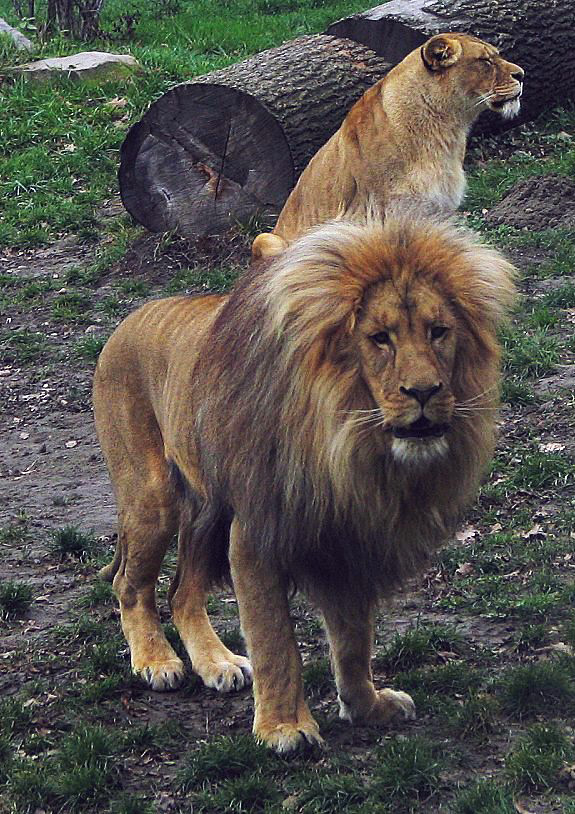
Southwest African lion (Panthera leo bleyenberghi).

The fauna again shows the effect of the characteristics of the vegetation. The open savannas are the home of large ungulates, especially antelopes, the giraffe (peculiar to Africa), zebra, African buffalo, African wild ass and four species of rhinoceros; and of carnivores, such as the lion, leopard, hyena, etc. The okapi (a genus restricted to Africa) is found only in the dense forests of the Congo basin. African wolves inhabit North Africa, and foxes range throughout the continent. The elephant (though its range has become restricted through the attacks of hunters) is found both in the savannas and forest regions, the latter being otherwise poor in large game, though the special habitat of the chimpanzee and gorilla. Baboons and mandrills, with few exceptions, are peculiar to Africa. The dromedary, as a domestic animal, is especially characteristic of the northern deserts and steppes.

The rivers in the tropical zone abound with hippopotami and crocodiles, the former entirely confined to Africa. The vast herds of game, formerly so characteristic of many parts of Africa, have much diminished with the increase of intercourse with the interior. Game reserves have, however, been established in South Africa, Central Africa, East Africa, Somaliland, etc., while measures for the protection of wild animals were laid down in an international convention signed in May 1900.

The ornithology of northern Africa presents a close resemblance to that of southern Europe, scarcely a species being found which does not also occur in the other countries bordering the Mediterranean. Among the birds most characteristic of Africa are the ostrich and the secretarybird. The ostrich is widely dispersed, but is found chiefly in the desert and steppe regions. The secretarybird is common in the south. The weaver birds and their allies, including the long-tailed whydahs, are abundant, as are, among game-birds, the francolin and guineafowl. Many of the smaller birds, such as the sunbirds, bee-eaters, the parrots and kingfishers, as well as the larger plantain-eaters, are noted for the brilliance of their feathers.

Of reptiles, the lizard and chameleon are common, and there are a number of venomous snakes, though these are not so numerous as in other tropical countries.

The scorpion is abundant. Of insects, Africa has many thousand different kinds; of these the locust is the proverbial scourge of the continent, and the ravages of the termites are almost incredible. The spread of malaria by means of mosquitoes is common. The tsetse fly, whose bite is fatal to all domestic animals, is common in many districts of South and East Africa. It is found nowhere outside Africa.

== See also ==
- Ecology
