= Choriceras majus =

Scientific classification
- Kingdom: Plantae
- Clade: Embryophytes
- Clade: Tracheophytes
- Clade: Spermatophytes
- Clade: Angiosperms
- Clade: Eudicots
- Clade: Rosids
- Order: Malpighiales
- Family: Picrodendraceae
- Genus: Choriceras
- Species: C. majus

Binomial name
- Choriceras majus Airy Shaw 1981

Species of flowering plant

Choriceras majus is a species of plant in the family Picrodendraceae and one of two species in the genus Choriceras. It is found in Queensland Australia.

== See also ==
- Taxonomy of the Picrodendraceae
