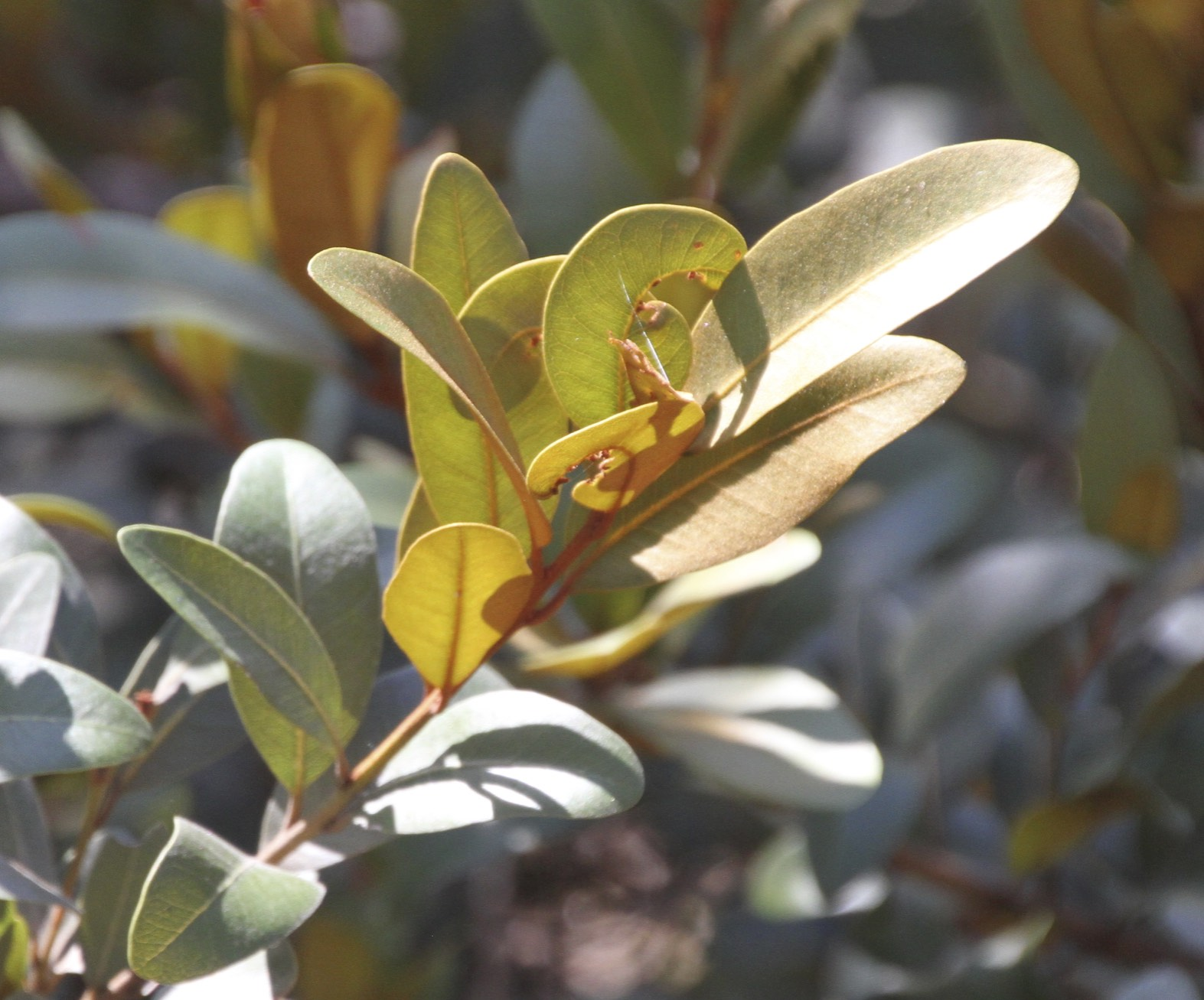

Conservation status
- Vulnerable (NCA)

Scientific classification
- Kingdom: Plantae
- Clade: Tracheophytes
- Clade: Angiosperms
- Clade: Eudicots
- Clade: Rosids
- Order: Malpighiales
- Family: Picrodendraceae
- Genus: Neoroepera
- Species: N. buxifolia

Binomial name
- Neoroepera buxifolia Müll.Arg. & F.Muell.

= Neoroepera buxifolia =

Species of flowering plant

Neoroepera buxifolia is a plant species in the Picrodendraceae family.

It is a monoecious shrub or small tree growing to 6 m high. The leaves are elliptic, 1 to 4 cm long, 0.6 to 2 cm wide and evenly spaced along the stems. The flowers are clustered along a short axis and subtended by numerous microscopic, semi-circular hairy bracts. The male flowers are 4.5 to 8 mm long, have 4 to 7 stamens, although usually 6, and ciliate margins on the perianth lobes. The female flowers are solitary, and apical with several male flowers below, 1 to 2 mm in diameter and styles with three distal, flattened, stigmatic portions. The fruit are obloid to obovoid, 5 to 8 mm long, at first conspicuously crowned with 3 long-persisting styles. The seeds are usually ellipsoid becoming dorsiventrally flattened with maturity and black when ripe.

It is endemic to the Gladstone District of Queensland, Australia.
