= Bitterbark =

Bitterbark or bitter bark is a common name for several species of plants and may refer to:

- Alstonia constricta, an Australian shrub
- Simarouba amara, a neotropical tree
- Petalostigma triloculare, the long leaved bitter bark, an Australian tree
- Sacoglottis gabonensis, a tree from Western to Central Africa
