= Stachyandra merana =

Scientific classification
- Kingdom: Plantae
- Clade: Tracheophytes
- Clade: Angiosperms
- Clade: Eudicots
- Clade: Rosids
- Order: Malpighiales
- Family: Picrodendraceae
- Genus: Stachyandra
- Species: S. merana

Binomial name
- Stachyandra merana (Airy Shaw) J.-F.Leroy ex Radcl.-Sm.

Species of plant

Stachyandra merana is a species of plant in the genus Stachyandra in the family Picrodendraceae.
