= Austrobuxus montis-do =

Conservation status
- Critically Endangered (IUCN 3.1)

Scientific classification
- Kingdom: Plantae
- Clade: Tracheophytes
- Clade: Angiosperms
- Clade: Eudicots
- Clade: Rosids
- Order: Malpighiales
- Family: Picrodendraceae
- Genus: Austrobuxus
- Species: A. montis-do

Binomial name
- Austrobuxus montis-do Airy Shaw

Species of flowering plant

Austrobuxus montis-do is a species of plant in the Picrodendraceae family. It is endemic to New Caledonia. It was first described by Herbert Kenneth Airy Shaw in 1978.
