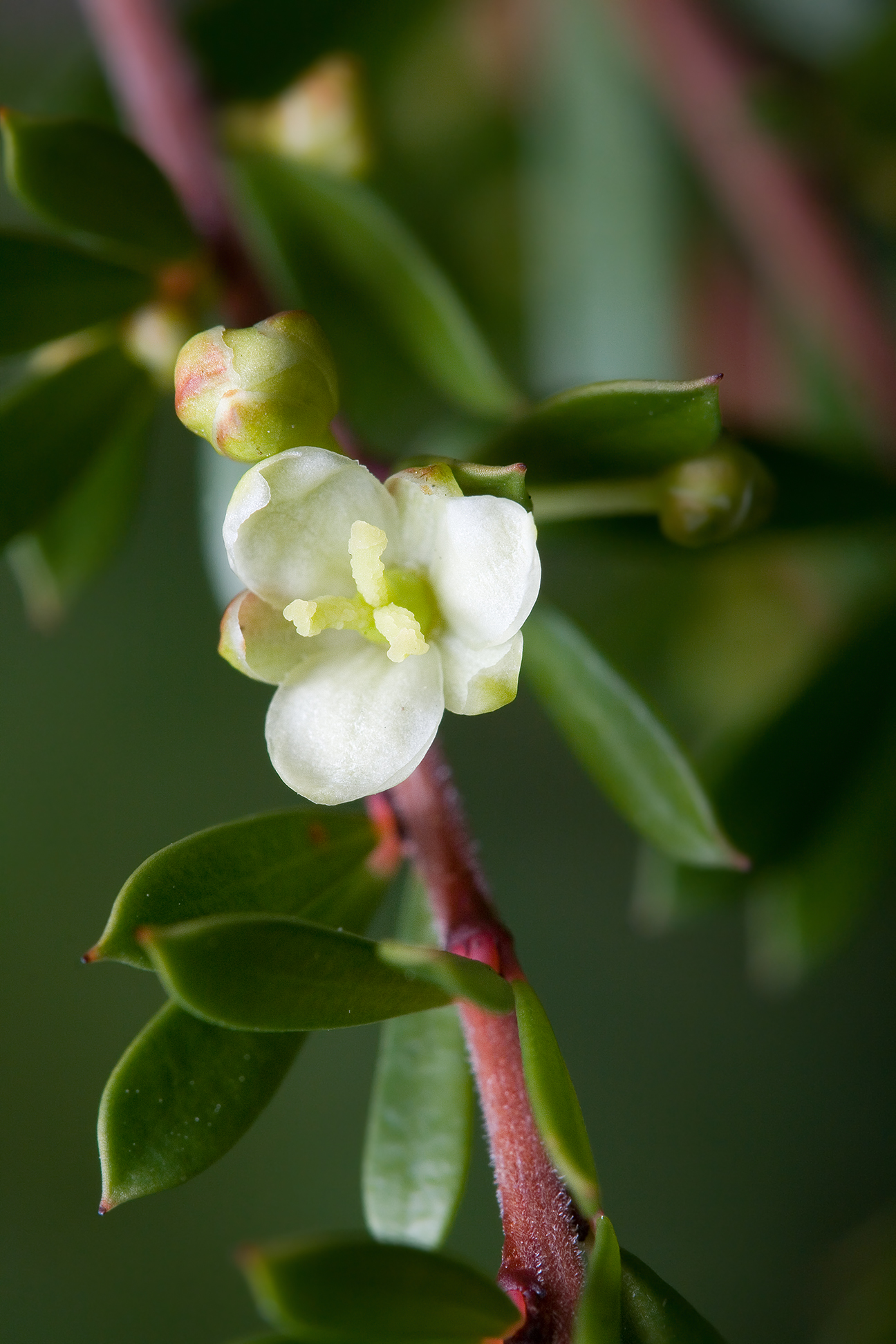
- Micrantheum serpentinum

Scientific classification
- Kingdom: Plantae
- Clade: Tracheophytes
- Clade: Angiosperms
- Clade: Eudicots
- Clade: Rosids
- Order: Malpighiales
- Family: Picrodendraceae
- Tribe: Caletieae; Müll.Arg.

Subtribes and genera
- Subtribe Dissiliariinae Austrobuxus Choriceras Dissiliaria Longetia Sankowskya Whyanbeelia Subtribe Hyaenanchinae Hyaenanche Subtribe Petalostigmatinae Petalostigma Subtribe Pseudanthinae Kairothamnus Micrantheum Neoroepera Pseudanthus Scagea

= Caletieae =

Tribe of flowering plants

The Caletieae is a tribe of plants under the family Picrodendraceae. It comprises 4 subtribes and 13 genera.

== See also ==
- Taxonomy of the Picrodendraceae
