= Oenoa =

Oenoa or Oinoa (Οἰνόα or Οἰνώα) may refer to:

- Oenoa (Argolis) (Οἰνώα), a town of ancient Argolis, Greece
- Oenoa (Locris) (Οἰνόα), a town of ancient Locris, Greece
