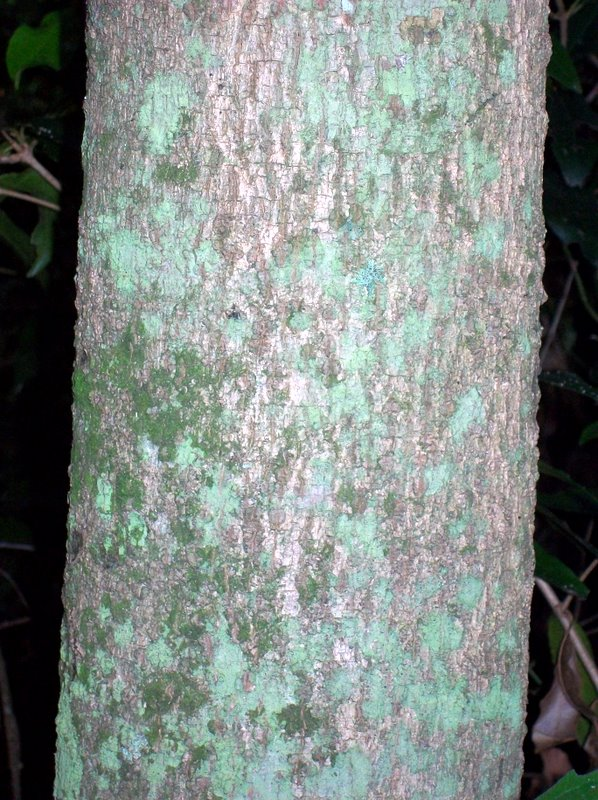
- Austrobuxus swainii trunk

Scientific classification
- Kingdom: Plantae
- Clade: Tracheophytes
- Clade: Angiosperms
- Clade: Eudicots
- Clade: Rosids
- Order: Malpighiales
- Family: Picrodendraceae
- Tribe: Caletieae
- Subtribe: Dissiliariinae
- Genus: Austrobuxus; Miq.

Synonyms
- Buraeavia Baill.; Canaca Guillaumin; Choriophyllum Benth.

= Austrobuxus =

Genus of flowering plants

Austrobuxus is a genus of plants under the family Picrodendraceae first described as a genus in 1861. It is native to Southeast Asia, Papuasia, and Australia. The region with the highest diversity is New Caledonia.

Species

1. Austrobuxus alticola - New Caledonia
2. Austrobuxus brevipes - New Caledonia
3. Austrobuxus carunculatus - New Caledonia
4. Austrobuxus celebicus - Sulawesi
5. Austrobuxus clusiceus - New Caledonia
6. Austrobuxus cracens - New Caledonia
7. Austrobuxus cuneatus - New Caledonia
8. Austrobuxus dentatus - W New Guinea
9. Austrobuxus ellipticus - New Caledonia
10. Austrobuxus eugeniifolius - New Caledonia
11. Austrobuxus horneanus - Vanua Levu
12. Austrobuxus huerlimannii - New Caledonia
13. Austrobuxus mandjelicus - New Caledonia
14. Austrobuxus megacarpus - Queensland
15. Austrobuxus montis-do - Mt. Do on New Caledonia
16. Austrobuxus nitidus - S Thailand, W Malaysia, Borneo, Sumatra
17. Austrobuxus ovalis - New Caledonia
18. Austrobuxus pauciflorus - New Caledonia
19. Austrobuxus petiolaris - Papua New Guinea
20. Austrobuxus rubiginosus - New Caledonia
21. Austrobuxus swainii - Queensland, New South Wales
22. Austrobuxus vieillardii - New Caledonia

formerly included

moved to other genera: Kairothamnus Longetia Scagea

1. A. buxoides - Longetia buxoides
2. A. depauperatus - Scagea depauperata
3. A. gracilis - Longetia buxoides
4. A. gynotrichus - Scagea oligostemon
5. A. oligostemon - Scagea oligostemon
6. A. phyllanthoides - Kairothamnus phyllanthoides
7. A. pisocarpus - Longetia buxoides
