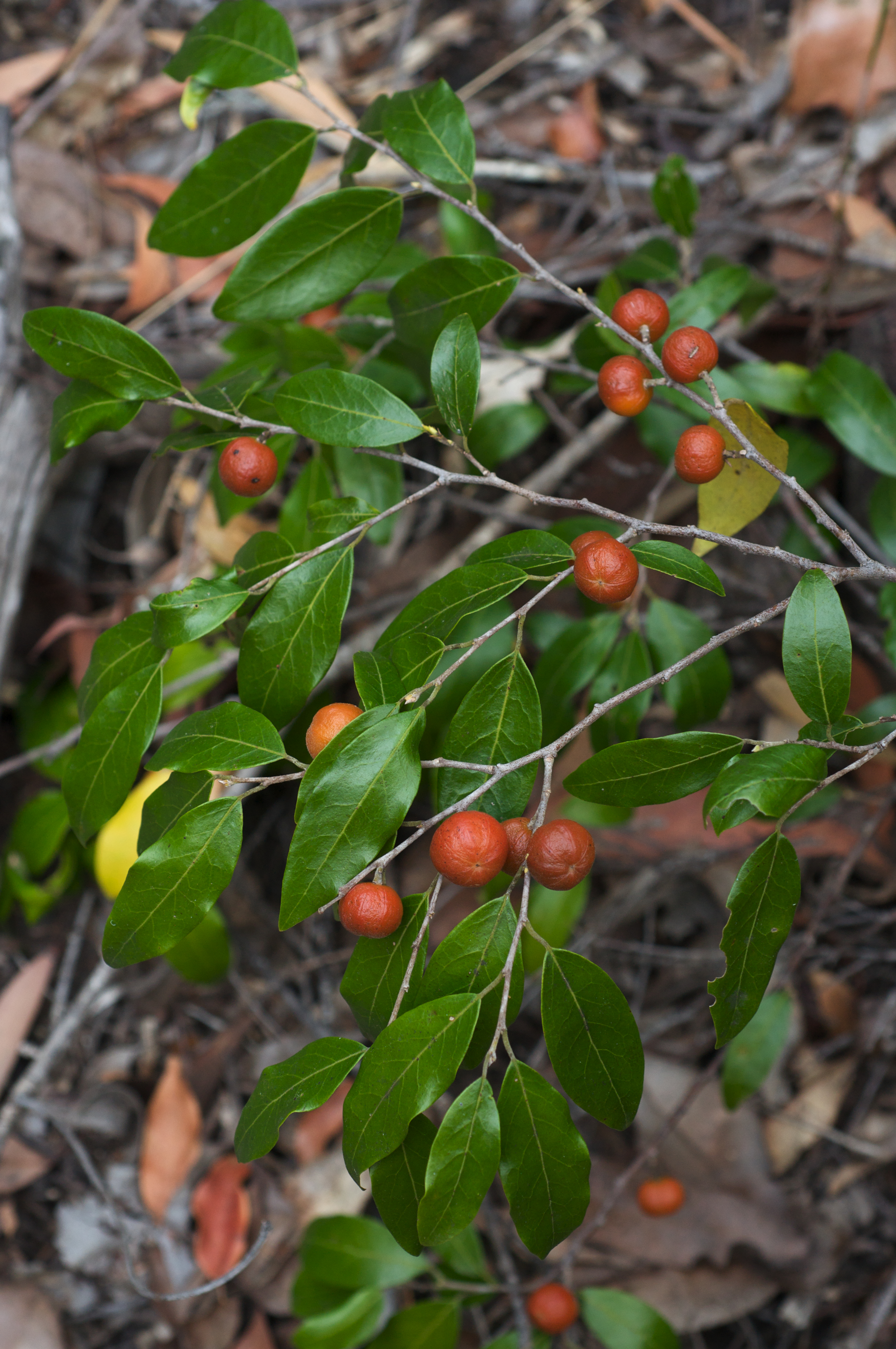
- Long-leaved bitter bark

Scientific classification
- Kingdom: Plantae
- Clade: Tracheophytes
- Clade: Angiosperms
- Clade: Eudicots
- Clade: Rosids
- Order: Malpighiales
- Family: Picrodendraceae
- Genus: Petalostigma
- Species: P. triloculare

Binomial name
- Petalostigma triloculare Mull.Arg.

Synonyms
- Petalostigma quadriloculare var. glabrescens Benth.; Petalostigma glabrescens (Benth.) Domin; Glochidion triloculare Merr.

= Petalostigma triloculare =

Species of tree

Petalostigma triloculare, known as the long-leaved bitter bark is a rainforest tree of eastern Australia. It occurs in the drier rainforests, often on sandy soil derived from granite or sandstone, and is sometimes seen on old sand dunes.

== Taxonomy ==
Petalostigma triloculare was first described by the Swiss botanist Johannes Müller Argoviensis in 1864. Petalostigma refers to the stigma which can be broadly flattened like a petal. "Triloculare" is derived from Latin and means three chambers, which in this case is obscure, as the fruit usually has four chambers. This species occasionally hybridises with Petalostigma pubescens.

== Description ==
Petalostigma triloculare grows as a small tree up to 15 metres (50 ft) tall with a stem diameter of 25 cm (10 in). The trunk is somewhat swollen at the base, and the bark is a dark grey with some vertical cracks and fissures. The inner bark is very bitter to taste. Small branches are greyish brown, relatively thin with silky hairs. New leaf buds are furry, as are the leaf stems which are grey and about 5 to 7 mm long.

The leaves are arranged alternately on the stem, 3 to 9 cm long, and 1 to 3.5 cm wide. They are a narrow elliptic shape, and smooth green above, and a felty dull grey below. The leaf veins are more easily seen above the leaf.

=== Flowers and fruit ===
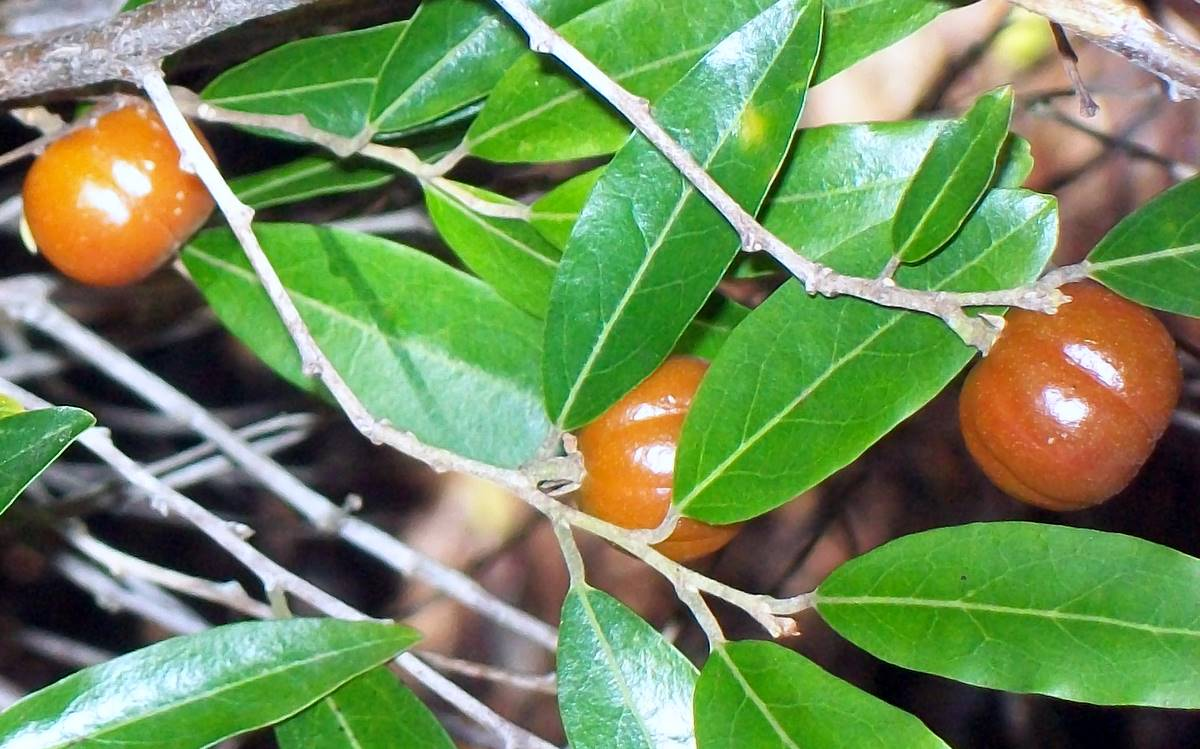
Close up of leaves and fruit of long leaved Bitter-Bark

Green or fawn coloured flowers form from October to January, though occasionally as early as July. Male and female flowers are on different trees. The male (but not female) flowers have a strong lemon scent. Three to five male flowers form on clusters from the leaf axils. Female flowers form singly. Flowers lack petals.

The fruit is an orange/brown drupe, 10 to 17 mm in diameter with usually eight faintly seen vertical grooves. Inside is a (usually) four celled endocarp. There are one or two flattened orange/brown seeds in each of the four cells. Seeds are 5 to 7 mm long. Fruit matures from March to October.

=== Regeneration ===
The fruits open explosively, throwing out parts of the fruit as far as four metres away, and scattering the seeds more than two metres away. Germination starts after around five weeks and is complete after seven weeks, with a success rate of about 23%.

== Distribution and habitat ==
This tree is distributed as far south as Woolgoolga in New South Wales, which has an average annual rainfall of 1,657 mm. However, it is also seen west of the Great Dividing Range near Coolatai and Yetman where the average rainfall is only around 640 mm. It grows as far north as Shoalwater Bay near the Tropic of Capricorn in central east Queensland.
