= Lorenzo Raimundo Parodi =

Argentine botanist (1895–1966)

Lorenzo Raimundo Parodi (23 January 1895 in Pergamino, Buenos Aires Province – 21 April 1966 in Buenos Aires) was an Argentine botanist and agronomist. Parodi studied at the University of Buenos Aires Faculty of Agronomy under Lucien Leon Hauman and in 1926 took Hauman's place as professor of botany.

Several plant genera, have been named in his honour; in 1929, Parodiodoxa, a genus of flowering plants from Argentina, belonging to the family Brassicaceae, then in 1941, Parodianthus, a genus of flowering plants from Argentina belonging to the family Verbenaceae. Followed by in 1969, Parodiodendron, a genus under the family Picrodendraceae, and lastly in 2008, Parodiophyllochloa is a genus of Latin American plants in the grass family.
