= Austrobuxus cracens =

Conservation status
- Vulnerable (IUCN 2.3)

Scientific classification
- Kingdom: Plantae
- Clade: Tracheophytes
- Clade: Angiosperms
- Clade: Eudicots
- Clade: Rosids
- Order: Malpighiales
- Family: Picrodendraceae
- Genus: Austrobuxus
- Species: A. cracens

Binomial name
- Austrobuxus cracens McPherson

Species of flowering plant

Austrobuxus cracens is a species of plant in the Picrodendraceae family. It is endemic to New Caledonia.
