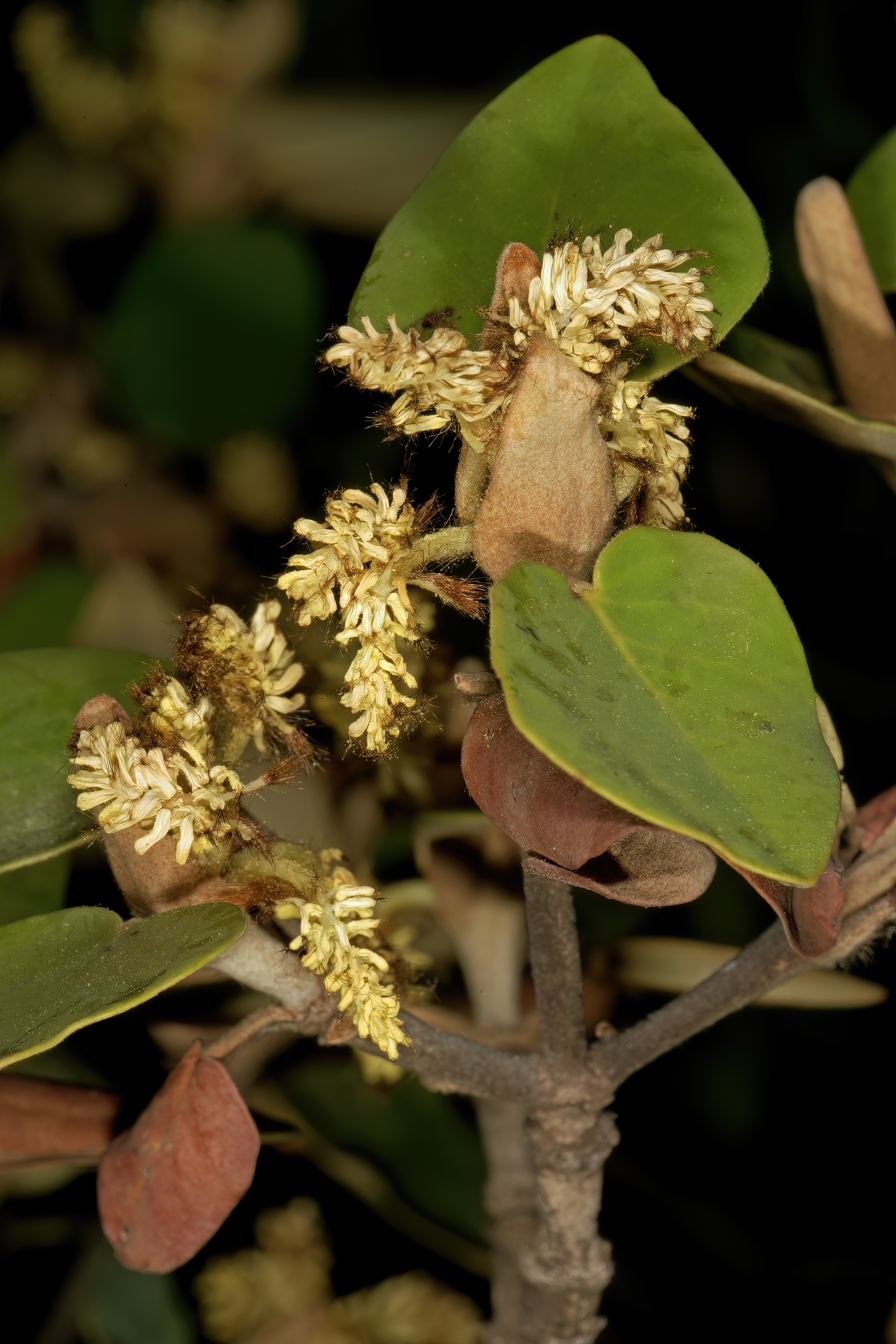

Scientific classification
- Kingdom: Plantae
- Clade: Tracheophytes
- Clade: Angiosperms
- Clade: Eudicots
- Clade: Rosids
- Order: Malpighiales
- Family: Picrodendraceae
- Tribe: Picrodendreae
- Subtribe: Mischodontinae
- Genus: Androstachys; Prain
- Species: A. johnsonii

Binomial name
- Androstachys johnsonii Prain

= Androstachys =

Lebombo ironwood

Genus of trees

Androstachys johnsonii, the Lebombo ironwood, is a medium-sized Afrotropical tree species, and the sole member of the genus Androstachys in the Picrodendraceae. It is slow-growing, evergreen to deciduous, and dioecious, with flowers that are wind-pollinated. It is native to southeastern Africa and Madagascar, where it generally occurs gregariously on rocky hillsides, particularly in hot and dry situations. It produces a hard, durable wood which is of economic interest. Its specific name commemorates W. H. Johnson, a 19th-century Director of Agriculture in Mozambique. Four related species which are native to Madagascar, are usually placed in genus Stachyandra.

== Uses ==
Its timber is of economical interest. The wood is extremely hard and durable. It is widely exploited in southern Mozambique, where it is known as simbirre. Here it is used for flooring, for which it is well-suited, and is commonly traded for pillars of huts and fences. South African tourist operators in Mozambique used it extensively for building structures near or in sea water. It is also traded as mecrussé in Mozambique, but rarely so, presumably due to a lack of supply.

== Range and habitat ==
Within southern Africa, it occurs in Limpopo Province, Mpumalanga and Eswatini. It is commonly found at elevations up to 1,000 m (3,000 ft). It forms dense shrub-like thickets and thrives in hot and dry climates with well drained soils, especially on rocky hillsides or along seasonal watercourses.

== Description ==
It is described as a medium-sized, evergreen tree growing up to 20 m high. It is characterised by a rough bark with a whitish, woolly, hair like covering on the new growth. The leaf blades are 3–9 × 2–7 cm and are oppositely paired at right angles. They are ovate to heart-shaped with both the apex and base rounded. The upper surfaces are shiny and are a green to blue-green color, beneath the surface is covered in dense, white, woolly hairs.

== Flowers ==
Flowering time is October–November. Flowers axillary, unisexual and vary in both arrangement and appearance. Male flowers are yellow and are arranged in a 3-flower cluster up to 3 cm (1.2 in) long. Central flowers are longer than the laterals with their pedicel being 1–1.3 cm (0.4–0.5 in) long versus the lateral length of 5–6 mm. Sepals; greenish petals that form the calyx of the flower differ in number; 5 in central flower and 2–3 in laterals. The bulbous base or receptacle of flower from which its organs grow are 2 cm (0.8 in) long in central; 1.5 cm (0.59 in) in laterals. Stamens up to c. 50 in central c. 35 in lateral, filaments of lowest stamens up to 1 mm long, anthers 3 x 0.5 mm covered in fine silky hairs in early development and then smooth, lacking hairs with maturation. Yellowish thecae of anthers. Female flowers are yellow and are at the end of a long, white hairy stalk. Pedicels are 1–1.5 cm (0.4–0.6 in) long, extending to up to 3 cm (1.2 in) long in fruit; sepals 7–8 × 2–2.5 mm and are an ovate-leaf shape, blunt tapering or sometimes split at apex, minutely ruffled with fine hairs on edge and base; otherwise smooth. Ovary is c. 3 mm in diameter, oval in shape, densely covered in fine white woolly hairs. Styles c. 7 mm long with fine hair covering, stigmas are globe shaped.

== Fruit ==
The fruit is bright green at first and ripens to a light yellow or reddish brown and is covered in fine bristle-like hairs. It is a 3-lobed capsule, 8–10 x 12–13 mm in size, and is easy to detach. The seeds are chestnut brown in colour, with a long, shallow, linear ridge. Their dimensions are 6.5–7(8) x 4.5–5(6) x 2–3 mm.

== See also ==
- Taxonomy of the Picrodendraceae
