= Dissiliaria =

Scientific classification
- Kingdom: Plantae
- Clade: Embryophytes
- Clade: Tracheophytes
- Clade: Spermatophytes
- Clade: Angiosperms
- Clade: Eudicots
- Clade: Rosids
- Order: Malpighiales
- Family: Picrodendraceae
- Tribe: Caletieae
- Subtribe: Dissiliariinae
- Genus: Dissiliaria; F.Muell. ex Baill.

Genus of flowering plants

Dissiliaria is a genus of plants under the family Picrodendraceae described as a genus in 1867.

The entire genus is endemic to the State of Queensland, Australia.

Species

- Dissiliaria baloghioides F.Muell. ex Baill
- Dissiliaria indistincta P.I.Forst.
- Dissiliaria laxinervis Airy Shaw
- Dissiliaria muelleri Baill.
- Dissiliaria surculosa P.I.Forst.
- Dissiliaria tuckeri P.I.Forst.

Formerly included

Dissiliaria tricornis Benth. - Choriceras tricorne (Benth.) Airy Shaw

== See also ==
- Taxonomy of the Picrodendraceae
