= Aristogeitonia monophylla =

Conservation status
- Near Threatened (IUCN 3.1)

Scientific classification
- Kingdom: Plantae
- Clade: Tracheophytes
- Clade: Angiosperms
- Clade: Eudicots
- Clade: Rosids
- Order: Malpighiales
- Family: Picrodendraceae
- Genus: Aristogeitonia
- Species: A. monophylla

Binomial name
- Aristogeitonia monophylla Airy Shaw

Species of flowering plant

Aristogeitonia monophylla is a species of plant in the Picrodendraceae family. It is found in Kenya and Tanzania. It is threatened by habitat loss.
