= Choriceras tricorne =

Scientific classification
- Kingdom: Plantae
- Clade: Embryophytes
- Clade: Tracheophytes
- Clade: Spermatophytes
- Clade: Angiosperms
- Clade: Eudicots
- Clade: Rosids
- Order: Malpighiales
- Family: Picrodendraceae
- Genus: Choriceras
- Species: C. tricorne

Binomial name
- Choriceras tricorne (Benth.) Airy Shaw

Synonyms
- Dissiliaria tricornis Benth.; Choriceras australiana Baill.

Species of flowering plant

Choriceras tricorne is a species of plants under the family Picrodendraceae and one of two species in the genus Choriceras. It is found in Southern New Guinea and Australia.

== See also ==
- Taxonomy of the Picrodendraceae
