= Parodianthus =

Scientific classification
- Kingdom: Plantae
- Clade: Tracheophytes
- Clade: Angiosperms
- Clade: Eudicots
- Clade: Asterids
- Order: Lamiales
- Family: Verbenaceae
- Genus: Parodianthus; Tronc.

Genus of flowering plant

Parodianthus is a genus of flowering plants belonging to the family Verbenaceae.

Its native range is northern Argentina.

The genus name of Parodianthus is in honour of Lorenzo Raimundo Parodi (1895–1966), an Argentinian botanist and agricultural engineer, professor of botany in Buenos Aires and La Plata with a focus on South American grasses. It was first described and published in Darwiniana Vol.5 on page 37 in 1941.

== Known species ==
According to Kew:

- Parodianthus capillaris Tronc.
- Parodianthus ilicifolius (Moldenke) Tronc.
