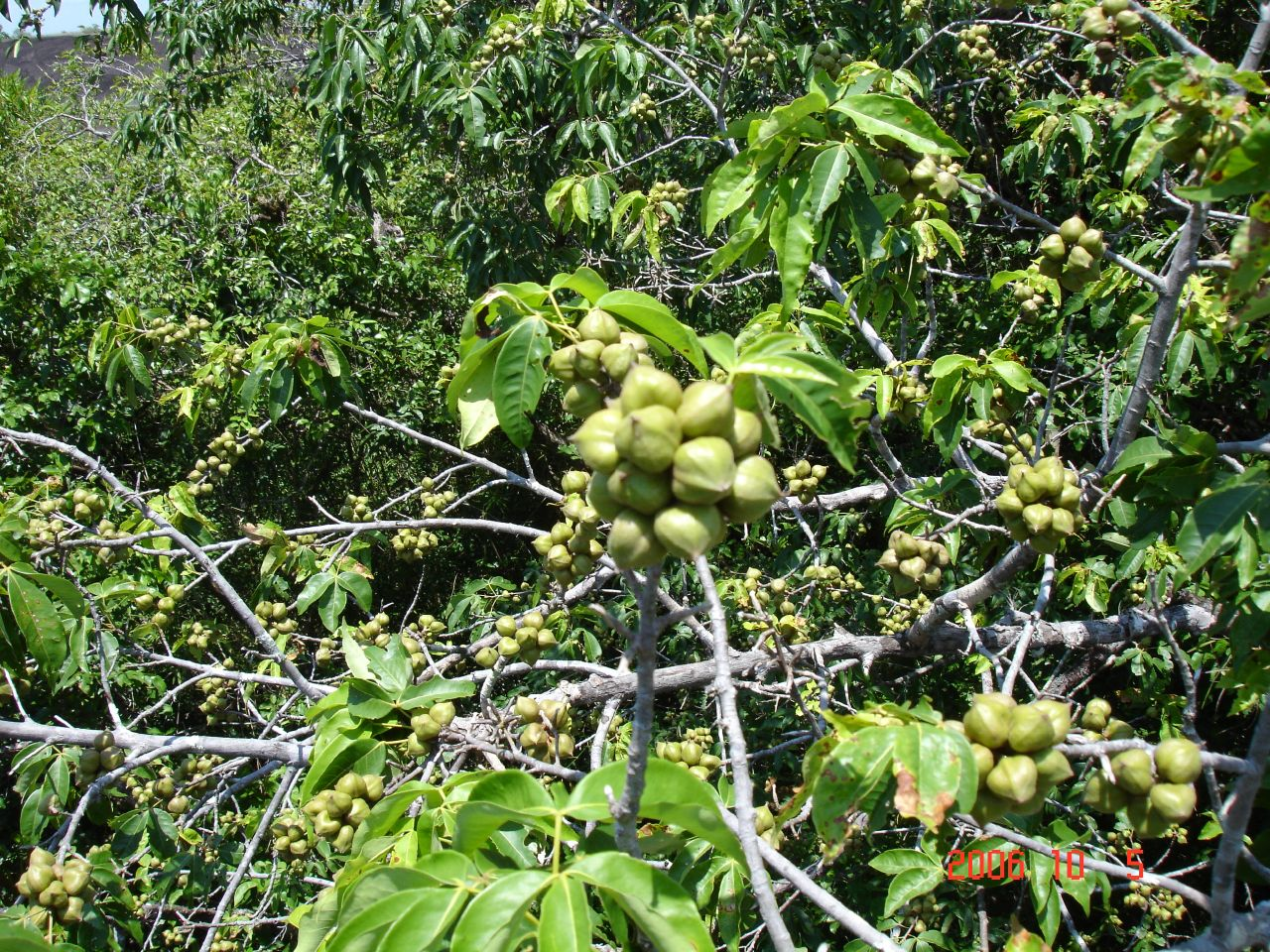
- Piranhea trifoliata

Scientific classification
- Kingdom: Plantae
- Clade: Tracheophytes
- Clade: Angiosperms
- Clade: Eudicots
- Clade: Rosids
- Order: Malpighiales
- Family: Picrodendraceae
- Genus: Piranhea
- Species: P. trifoliata

Binomial name
- Piranhea trifoliata Baill.

= Piranhea trifoliata =

Species of tree

Piranhea trifoliata, the three-leaf piranhea, is a species of tree in the family Picrodendraceae. It is native to Bolivia, Brazil, Guyana and Venezuela. The flowers are attractive to bees.
