= Parodiophyllochloa =

Scientific classification
- Kingdom: Plantae
- Clade: Tracheophytes
- Clade: Angiosperms
- Clade: Monocots
- Clade: Commelinids
- Order: Poales
- Family: Poaceae
- Subfamily: Panicoideae
- Supertribe: Panicodae
- Tribe: Paniceae
- Subtribe: Boivinellinae
- Genus: Parodiophyllochloa; Zuloaga & Morrone

Type species
- Parodiophyllochloa cordovense E.Fourn.

Genus of grasses

Parodiophyllochloa is a genus of Latin American plants in the grass family.

The genus name of Parodiophyllochloa is in honour of Lorenzo Raimundo Parodi (1895–1966), an Argentinian botanist and agricultural engineer, professor of botany in Buenos Aires and La Plata with a focus on South American grasses.

Species

- Parodiophyllochloa cordovensis - from northern Mexico to northern Argentina
- Parodiophyllochloa missiona - Brazil, Uruguay, Paraguay, northeastern Argentina
- Parodiophyllochloa ovulifera - tropical South America
- Parodiophyllochloa pantricha - tropical South + Central America
- Parodiophyllochloa penicillata - Brazil
- Parodiophyllochloa rhizogona - Brazil, northeastern Argentina
