= Oldfieldia africana =

Scientific classification
- Kingdom: Plantae
- Clade: Embryophytes
- Clade: Tracheophytes
- Clade: Angiosperms
- Clade: Eudicots
- Clade: Rosids
- Order: Malpighiales
- Family: Picrodendraceae
- Genus: Oldfieldia
- Species: O. africana

Binomial name
- Oldfieldia africana Benth. & Hook.f.

Species of tree

Oldfieldia africana, also known as the African oak, is a large tree which can grow to 36 metres or more in height. It is to be found across West Africa in such countries as Ivory Coast, Liberia, Sierra Leone, Gabon, Cameroon, Central African Republic, Congo Republic.

Numbers have decreased as its timber is very heavy and hard, comparable to teak. John MacCormac an Irish businessman who settled on the banks of the Rokel River, Sierra Leone for example, established the local timber trade in 1816, and for a while enjoyed a substantial income from it.

== Medicinal uses ==
The bark maybe used as an antiseptic and haemostatic. It can also be added to various herbs in order to increase their potency. Another use is a decoction of the barkwhich can be added to baths or draughts as a treatment for blennorrhoea. The powdered bark can be used in a dressing to hasten healing or to treat sores. The bark can be boiled with palm-oil to make an ointment, to treat lice infestation or the leaves can be used in a similar way.
