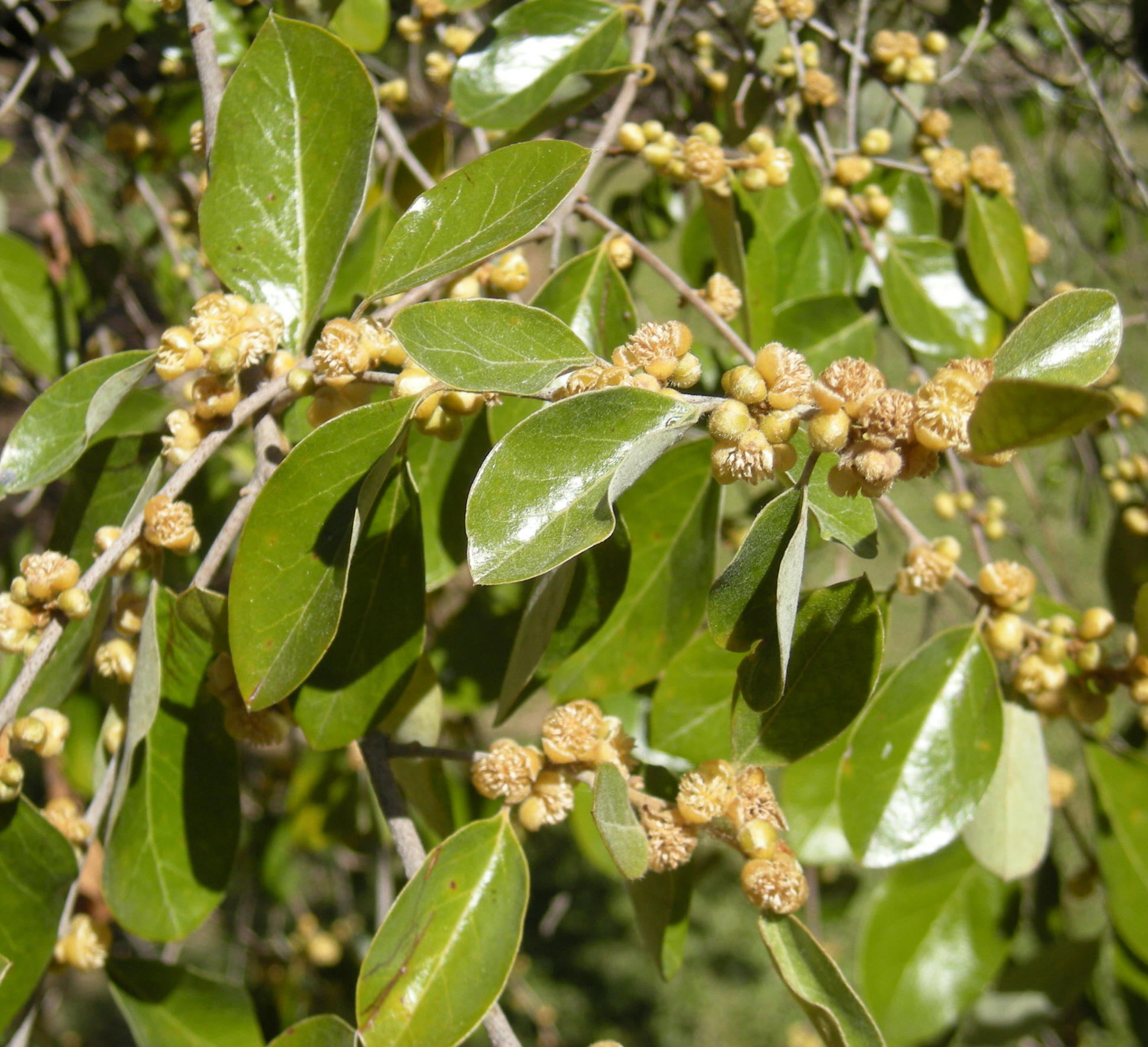
- Petalostigma pubescens

Scientific classification
- Kingdom: Plantae
- Clade: Tracheophytes
- Clade: Angiosperms
- Clade: Eudicots
- Clade: Rosids
- Order: Malpighiales
- Family: Picrodendraceae
- Tribe: Caletieae
- Subtribe: Petalostigmatinae
- Genus: Petalostigma; F.Muell.

Type species
- Petalostigma quadriloculare F.Muell.

Synonyms
- Hylococcus R.Br. ex T.Mitch.

= Petalostigma =

Genus of flowering plants

Petalostigma is a genus of plants under the family Picrodendraceae and the monogeneric subtribe Petalostigmatinae, first defined by von Mueller in 1857. It is native to New Guinea and Australia. They are evergreen, dioecious shrubs or trees.

In local medicine, pregnancy is said to be avoided by eating the fruit of the quinine bush (Petalostigma pubescens), which does not actually contains quinine. Another example is Petalostigma triloculare which features exploding fruit.

== Species ==
This is a list of species in the genus as published by the Kew Royal Botanic Gardens.

- Petalostigma banksii – Northern Territory, Queensland
- Petalostigma pachyphyllum – Queensland
- Petalostigma pubescens – quinine berry, quinine bush, quinine tree – Papua New Guinea, Queensland, Northern Territory, New South Wales, Western Australia
- Petalostigma quadriloculare – Queensland, Northern Territory, Western Australia
- Petalostigma triloculare – Queensland

== See also ==
- Cinchona – another genus known for containing quinine
- Taxonomy of the Picrodendraceae
