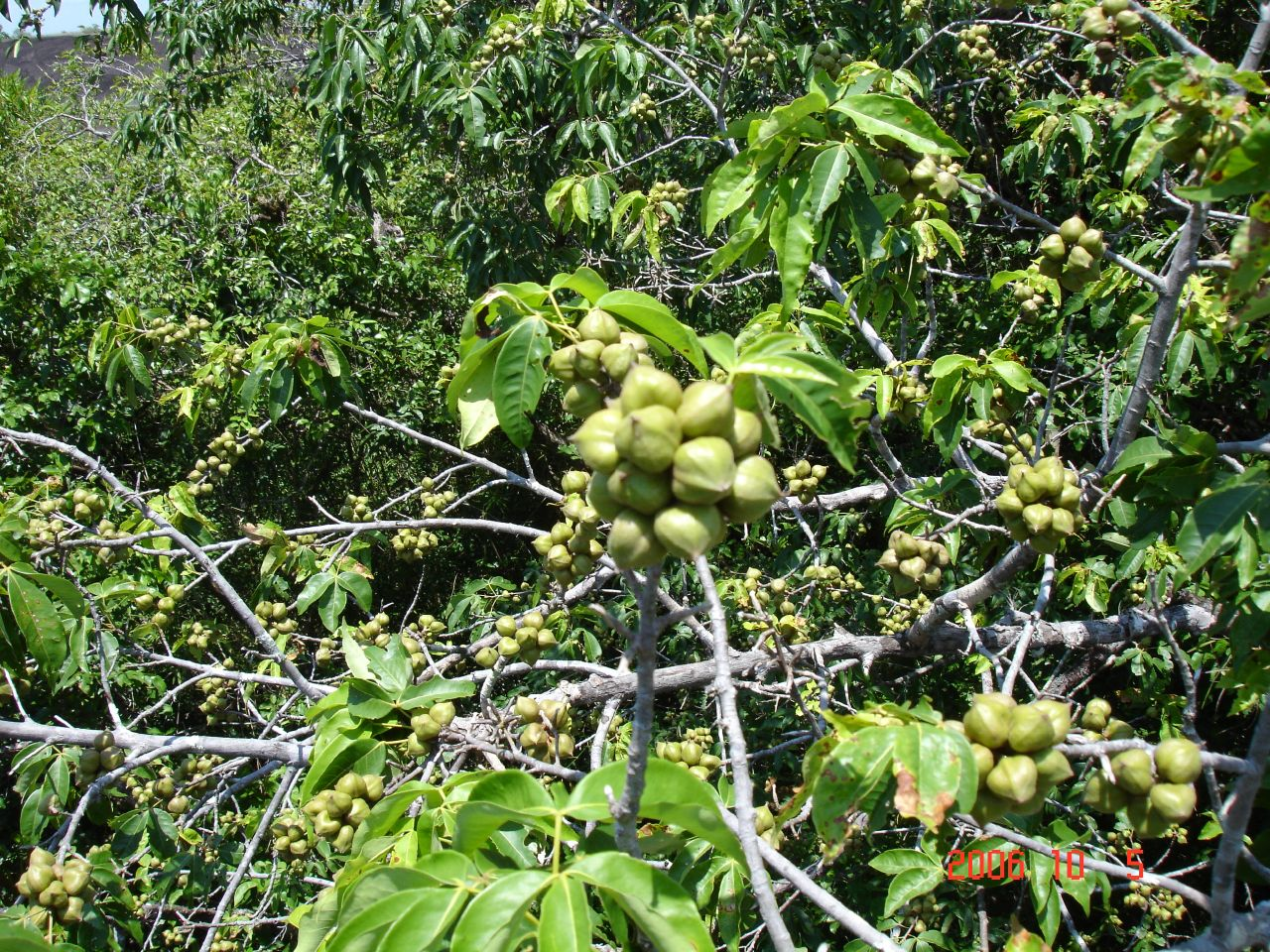
- Piranhea trifoliata

Scientific classification
- Kingdom: Plantae
- Clade: Tracheophytes
- Clade: Angiosperms
- Clade: Eudicots
- Clade: Rosids
- Order: Malpighiales
- Family: Picrodendraceae
- Tribe: Picrodendreae
- Subtribe: Picrodendrinae
- Genus: Piranhea; Baill.

Synonyms
- Celaenodendron Standl.

= Piranhea =

Genus of flowering plants

Piranhea is a plant genus under the family Picrodendraceae described as a genus in 1866.

Piranhea is native to South America and to Mexico.

species

1. Piranhea longipedunculata Jabl. - Venezuela, N Brazil
2. Piranhea mexicana (Standl.) Radcl.-Sm. - Jalisco, Nayarit, Sinaloa
3. Piranhea securinega Radcl.-Sm. & Ratter - Bahia, Goiás, Minas Gerais
4. Piranhea trifoliata Baill. - Venezuela, Guyana, Brazil

== See also ==
- Taxonomy of the Picrodendraceae
