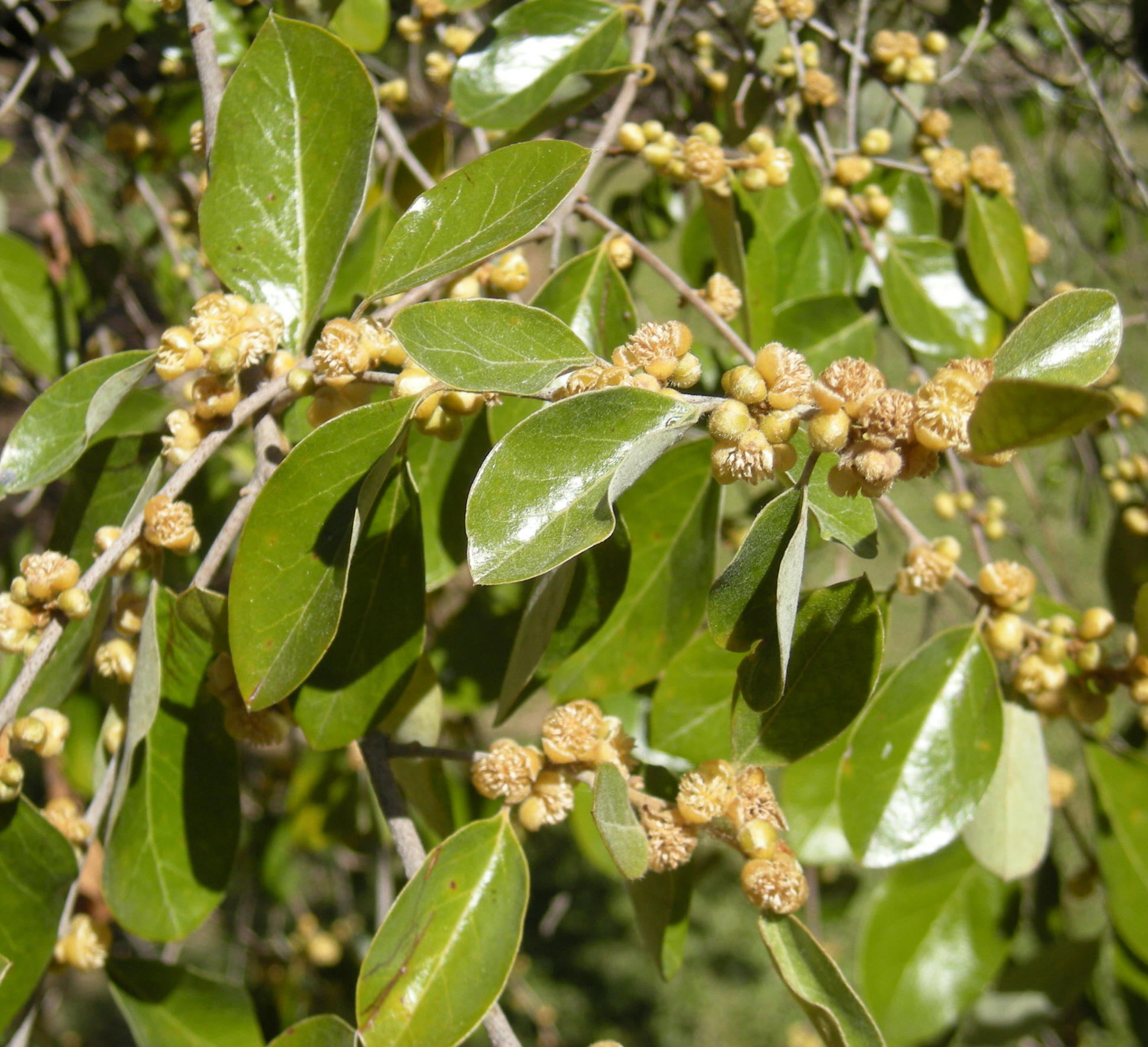
- quinine bush, Mt Archer National Park

Scientific classification
- Kingdom: Plantae
- Clade: Tracheophytes
- Clade: Angiosperms
- Clade: Eudicots
- Clade: Rosids
- Order: Malpighiales
- Family: Picrodendraceae
- Genus: Petalostigma
- Species: P. pubescens

Binomial name
- Petalostigma pubescens Domin

Synonyms
- Petalostigma quadriloculare var. pubescens Müll.Arg.; Petalostigma quadriloculare var. nigrum Ewart & O.B.Davies; Petalostigma nummularium Airy Shaw

= Petalostigma pubescens =

Species of tree

Petalostigma pubescens, known as the quinine bush is a rainforest tree native to Papua New Guinea, Queensland, Northern Territory, New South Wales, Western Australia. It was first described by the botanist Karel Domin in 1927.

== See also ==
- Territory Native Plants - Quinine Bush
