= Podocalyx =

Scientific classification
- Kingdom: Plantae
- Clade: Tracheophytes
- Clade: Angiosperms
- Clade: Eudicots
- Clade: Rosids
- Order: Malpighiales
- Family: Picrodendraceae
- Tribe: Podocalyceae
- Subtribe: Podocalycinae
- Genus: Podocalyx; Klotzsch
- Species: P. loranthoides

Binomial name
- Podocalyx loranthoides Klotzsch

Synonyms
- Richeria loranthoides (Klotzsch) Müll.Arg.; Cunuria casiquiarensis Croizat

Genus of flowering plants

Podocalyx is a plant genus under the family Picrodendraceae described in 1841. It is the sole genus in the subtribe Podocalycinae. There is only one known species, Podocalyx loranthoides, a tree native to Venezuela, Colombia, Peru, and northwestern Brazil.

== See also ==
- Taxonomy of the Picrodendraceae
