= Parodiodoxa =

Scientific classification
- Kingdom: Plantae
- Clade: Tracheophytes
- Clade: Angiosperms
- Clade: Eudicots
- Clade: Rosids
- Order: Brassicales
- Family: Brassicaceae
- Genus: Parodiodoxa; O.E.Schulz
- Species: P. chionophila

Binomial name
- Parodiodoxa chionophila (Speg.) O.E.Schulz

Synonyms
- Thlaspi chionophilum Speg.

Species of flowering plant

Parodiodoxa is a genus of flowering plants belonging to the family Brassicaceae. It just contains one species, Parodiodoxa chionophila, a perennial or subshrub native to subalpine areas of northwestern Argentina.

The genus name of Parodiodoxa is in honour of Lorenzo Raimundo Parodi (1895–1966), an Argentinian botanist and agricultural engineer, professor of botany in Buenos Aires and La Plata, with a focus on South American grasses. The Latin specific epithet of chionophila means snow lover. Both the genus and the species were first described and published in Notizbl. Bot. Gart. Berlin-Dahlem Vol.10 on pages 781–783 in 1929.
