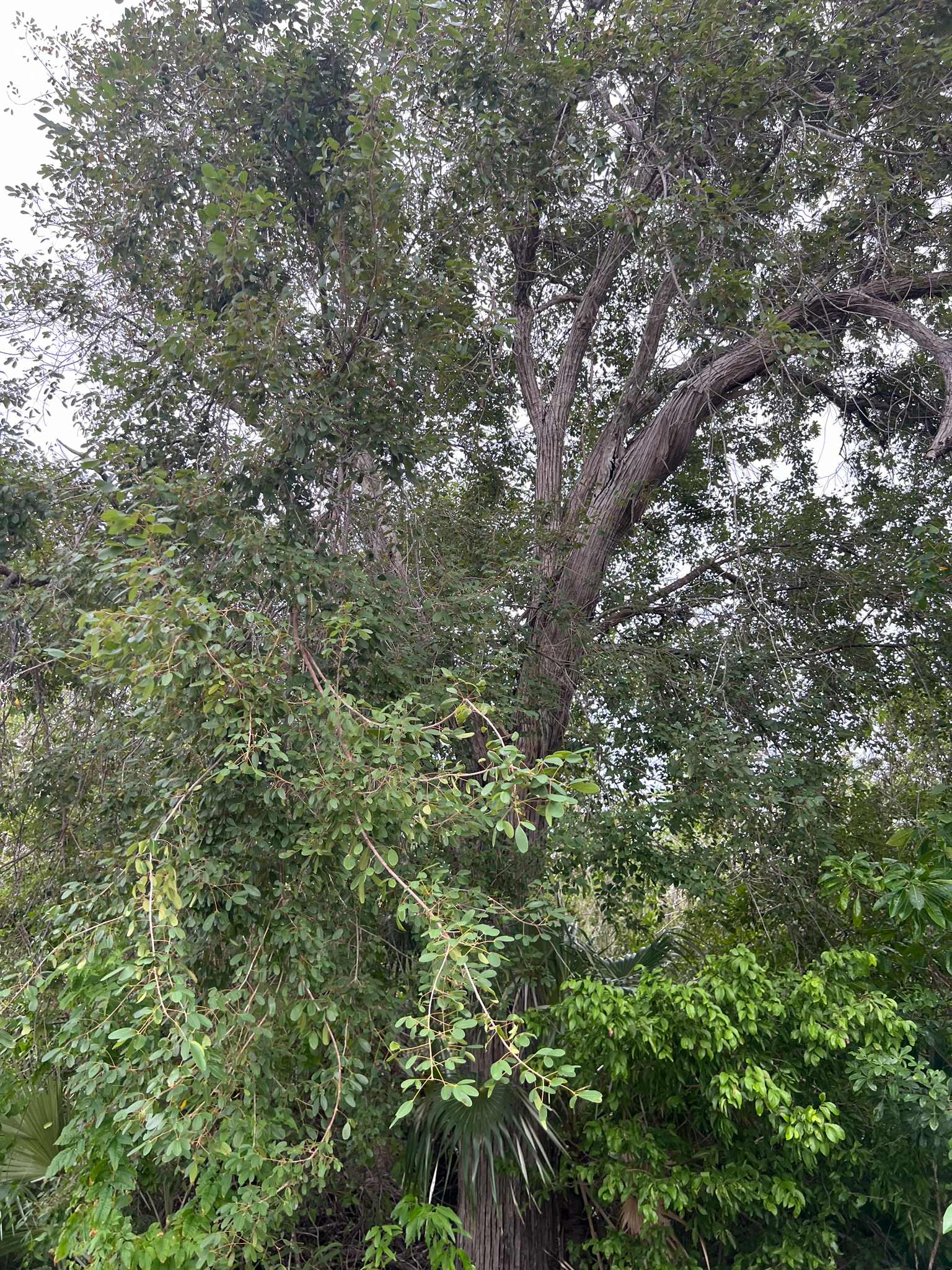
- Picrodendron baccatum in the Cayman Islands

Conservation status
- Least Concern (IUCN 3.1)

Scientific classification
- Kingdom: Plantae
- Clade: Tracheophytes
- Clade: Angiosperms
- Clade: Eudicots
- Clade: Rosids
- Order: Malpighiales
- Family: Picrodendraceae
- Tribe: Picrodendreae
- Subtribe: Picrodendrinae
- Genus: Picrodendron; Griseb. 1859, conserved name, not Planch. 1846
- Species: P. baccatum

Binomial name
- Picrodendron baccatum (L.) Krug & Urb.

Synonyms
- Juglans baccata L.; Picrodendron juglans Griseb.; Schmidelia macrocarpa A.Rich.; Picrodendron macrocarpum (A.Rich.) Britton; Picrodendron medium Small

= Picrodendron =

Genus of flowering plants

Picrodendron is a genus of plant in the family Picrodendraceae, described in 1859. It contains one species, Picrodendron baccatum, native to the West Indies (Bahamas, Cayman Islands, Cuba, Hispaniola, Jamaica and the Swan Islands of Honduras).

== See also ==
- Taxonomy of the Picrodendraceae
