= Mischodon =

Scientific classification
- Kingdom: Plantae
- Clade: Tracheophytes
- Clade: Angiosperms
- Clade: Eudicots
- Clade: Rosids
- Order: Malpighiales
- Family: Picrodendraceae
- Tribe: Picrodendreae
- Subtribe: Mischodontinae
- Genus: Mischodon; Thwaites
- Species: M. zeylanicus

Binomial name
- Mischodon zeylanicus Thwaites

Genus of trees

Mischodon is a genus in the family Picrodendraceae, described in 1854. The only known species is Mischodon zeylanicus, a tree native to southern India, Sri Lanka, and the Andaman Islands.

== Common names ==
- Sinhala - Tammanna (තම්මැන්න)
- Tamil - Tampanai

== See also ==
- Taxonomy of the Picrodendraceae
