= Parodiodendron =

Conservation status
- Vulnerable (IUCN 2.3)

Scientific classification
- Kingdom: Plantae
- Clade: Tracheophytes
- Clade: Angiosperms
- Clade: Eudicots
- Clade: Rosids
- Order: Malpighiales
- Family: Picrodendraceae
- Tribe: Picrodendreae
- Subtribe: Picrodendrinae
- Genus: Parodiodendron; Hunz.
- Species: P. marginivillosum

Binomial name
- Parodiodendron marginivillosum (Speg.) Hunz.

Synonyms
- Phyllanthus marginivillosus Speg.

Genus of flowering plants

Parodiodendron is a monotypic plant genus under the family Picrodendraceae, described as a genus in 1969. The sole species is Parodiodendron marginivillosum (Speg.) Hunz..

It is found in northern Argentina (Jujuy and Salta Provinces), Bolivia (Tarija and Santa Cruz departments).

It is listed as vulnerable, threatened by habitat loss.

The genus name of Parodiodendron is in honour of Lorenzo Raimundo Parodi (1895–1966), an Argentinian botanist and agricultural engineer, professor of botany in Buenos Aires and La Plata with a focus on South American grasses. It was first described and published in Kurtziana Vol.5 on page 331 in 1969.

== See also ==
- Taxonomy of the Picrodendraceae
