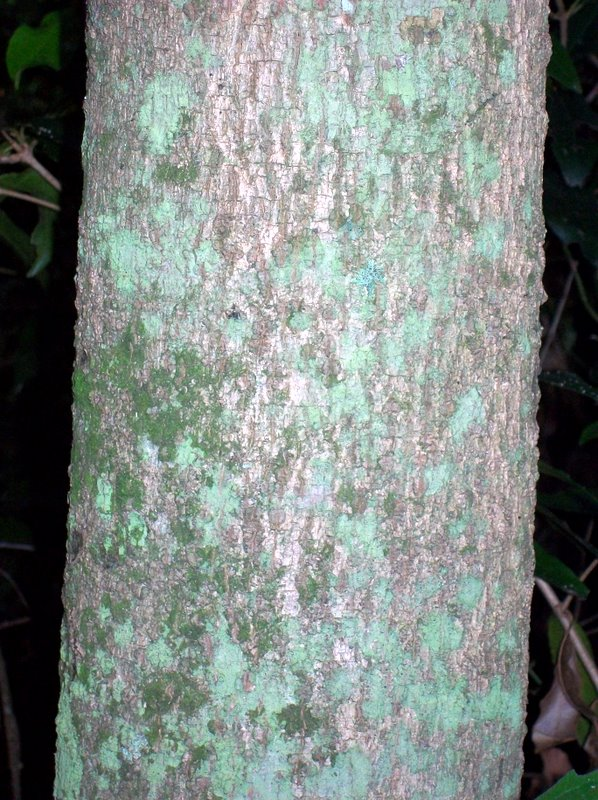
- Trunk

Scientific classification
- Kingdom: Plantae
- Clade: Tracheophytes
- Clade: Angiosperms
- Clade: Eudicots
- Clade: Rosids
- Order: Malpighiales
- Family: Picrodendraceae
- Genus: Austrobuxus
- Species: A. swainii

Binomial name
- Austrobuxus swainii (Beuzev. & C.T.White) Airy Shaw

Synonyms
- Longetia swainii Beuzev. & C.T.White

= Austrobuxus swainii =

Hairybark

Species of tree

Austrobuxus swainii is a rare rainforest tree in the Picrodendraceae family. It is endemic to northeast New South Wales and southeastern Queensland, Australia. Occurring from the Bellinger River in the south to Tallebudgera Creek in the north. The common names are pink cherry or hairybark. The habitat is less fertile sedimentary based soils, often associated with the coachwood, in high rainfall areas. Listed on ROTAP, as a threatened species, with a rating of 3RCa.

== Description ==
A medium to large tree, 40 metres tall and a trunk diameter of one metre. The trunk is flanged or irregular, somewhat buttressed at the base. Bark is scaly, grey or brown and sheds in irregular patches, leaving slight depressions. Small branches are slender, grey or fawn in colour, dotted with many pale lenticels.

The leaves are 7 to 14 cm long, and 2 to 4 cm wide, lanceolate in shape, opposite on the stem with around 40 small teeth on the leaf edges. Leaf stalks up to 10 mm long. Old red leaves can be seen in the canopy.

=== Flowers and fruit ===
Yellow or green flowers form on panicles from April to June. The tiny flowers are 4 petalled. The panicle is around 25 mm long, forming from the forks of the leaves. The fruit is a dark brown or black capsule, around 13 mm long, with two protruding styles at the fruit's apex. The capsule splits into four parts with two glossy brown seeds, 6 mm long. Fruit mature from February to March. Fresh seed or cuttings are advised for regeneration.
