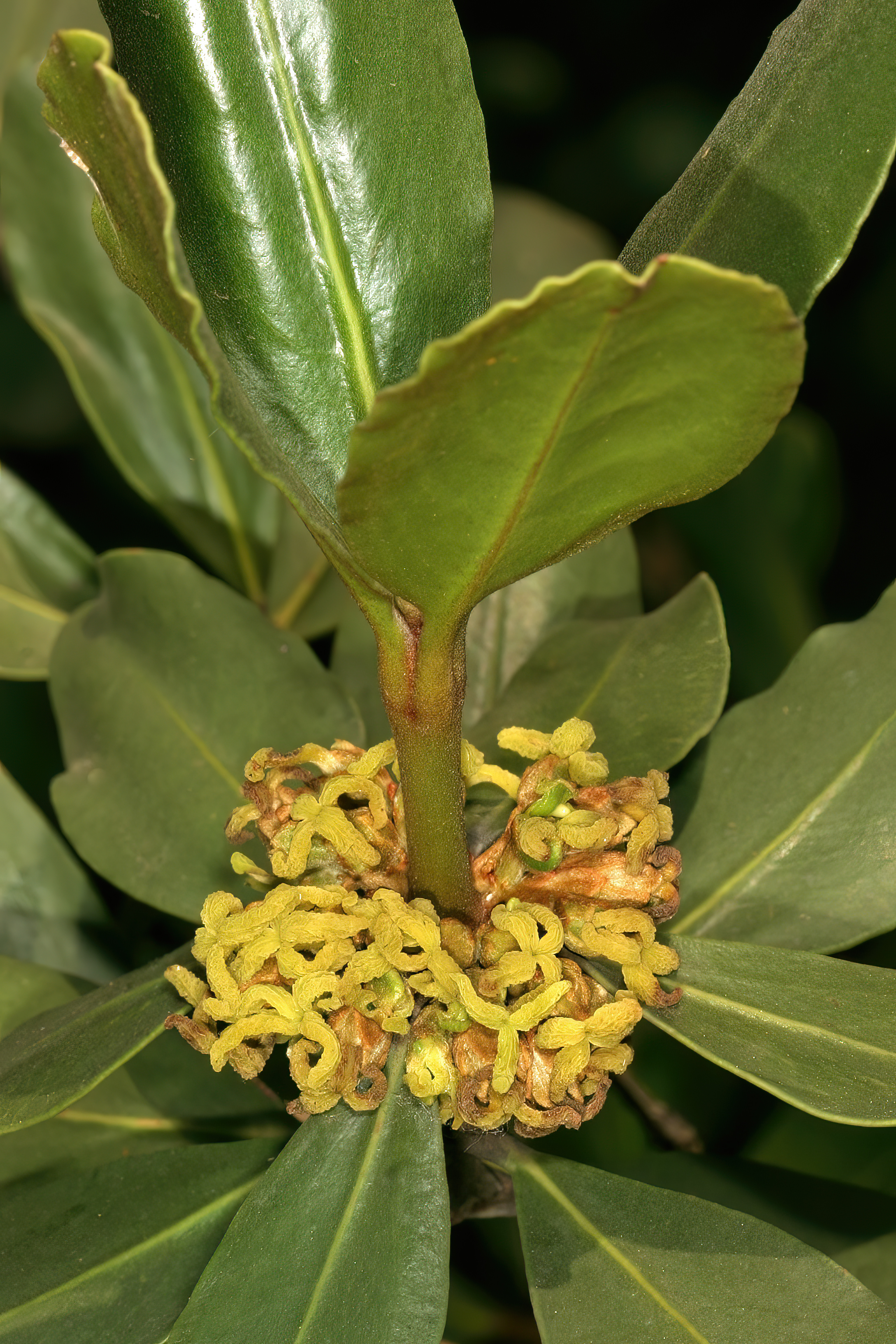
- Hyaenanche globosa at Manie van der Schijff Botanical Garden, South Africa

Scientific classification
- Kingdom: Plantae
- Clade: Tracheophytes
- Clade: Angiosperms
- Clade: Eudicots
- Clade: Rosids
- Order: Malpighiales
- Family: Picrodendraceae
- Tribe: Caletieae
- Subtribe: Hyaenanchinae
- Genus: Hyaenanche; Lamb.
- Species: H. globosa

Binomial name
- Hyaenanche globosa Lamb. & Vahl 1797

Synonyms
- Toxicodendrum Thunb. 1796, illegitimate homonym, not Gaertn. 1788 (syn of Allophylus in Sapindaceae); Jatropha globosa Gaertn.; Toxicodendrum globosum (Gaertn.) Pax & K.Hoffm.; Toxicodendrum capense Thunb.; Hyaenanche capensis (Thunb.) Pers.

= Hyaenanche =

Genus of flowering plants

Hyaenanche globosa is a species of plant under the family Picrodendraceae. It is the sole member of the genus Hyaenanche and the subtribe Hyaenanchinae. It is endemic to Cape Province in South Africa.

== See also ==
- Taxonomy of the Picrodendraceae
