= Aristogeiton (sculptor) =

Aristogeiton (Ancient Greek: Ἀριστογείτων) was a statuary and a native of Thebes. In conjunction with Hypatodorus, he was the maker of some statues of the heroes of the Argive and Theban tradition, which the Argives had made to commemorate a victory gained by themselves and the Athenians over the Spartans at Oenoe in Argolis, and dedicated in the temple of Apollo at Delphi.

The names of these two artists occur together likewise on the pedestal of a statue found at Delphi, which had been erected in honor of a citizen of Orchomenus, who had been a victor probably in the Pythian games. We learn from this inscription that they were both Thebans. Pliny the Elder says that Hypatodorus lived about the 102nd Olympiad, or roughly the early 4th century BCE. The above-mentioned inscription was doubtless earlier than the 104th Olympiad, when Orchomenos was destroyed by the Thebans.

The battle mentioned by Pausanias was probably some skirmish in the war which followed the treaty between the Athenians and Argives, which was brought about by Alcibiades in 420 BCE. It appears therefore that Aristogeiton and Hypatodorus lived in the latter part of the fifth and the early part of the fourth centuries BCE. German classicist August Böckh attempted to show that Aristogeiton was in fact the son of Hypatodorus, but later scholars did not find his arguments convincing.
