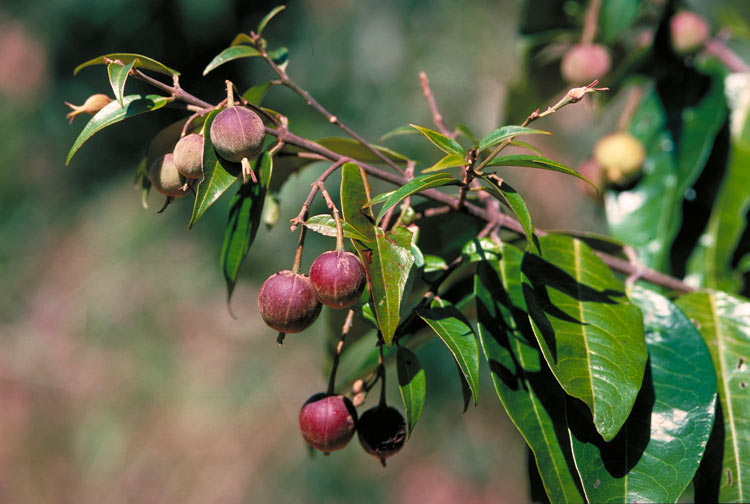

Scientific classification
- Kingdom: Plantae
- Clade: Tracheophytes
- Clade: Angiosperms
- Clade: Eudicots
- Clade: Rosids
- Order: Malpighiales
- Family: Picrodendraceae
- Tribe: Caletieae
- Subtribe: Dissiliariinae
- Genus: Whyanbeelia; Airy Shaw & B.Hyland
- Species: W. terrae-reginae

Binomial name
- Whyanbeelia terrae-reginae Airy Shaw & B.Hyland

= Whyanbeelia =

Genus of flowering plants

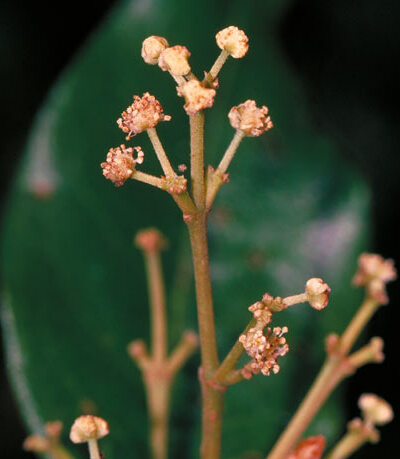
Male flowers

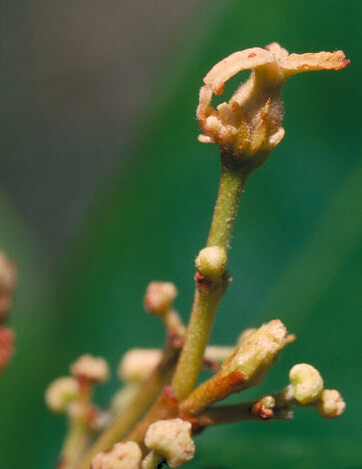
Female flowers

Whyanbeelia is a genus of flowering plants in the family Picrodendraceae with only one species, Whyanbeelia terrae-reginae that is endemic to a small area of Queensland. Whyanbeelia terrae-reginae is a dioecious rainforest tree with narrowly egg-shaped leaves, flowers arranged in loose groups, and fruit a more or less spherical capsule.

== Description ==
Whyanbeelia terrae-reginae is a dioecious tree that typically grows to a height of up to 20 m (66 ft), its young growth covered with soft hairs. The leaves are arranged in opposite pairs, narrowly elliptic, 60–160 mm (2.4–6.3 in) long and 25–60 mm (0.98–2.36 in) wide on a petiole 4–9 mm (0.16–0.35 in) long, and tapering to a long drip tip. The leaves sometimes smell like sarsaparilla when crushed. The flowers are arranged in upper leaf axils in groups 60 mm (2.4 in) long, of all male flowers or male flowers interspersed with female flowers. Individual flowers are borne on a pedicel up to 9 mm (0.35 in) long. Male flowers have sepals in two whorls of three, the outer sepals egg-shaped, 1.0–1.5 mm (0.039–0.059 in) long and about 1 mm (0.039 in) wide, the inner sepals round and about 2 mm (0.079 in) in diameter. Male flowers have between 50 and 55 stamens. Female flowers have six tapering sepals that are similar to each other and 1–2 mm (0.039–0.079 in) long. The ovary is oval, about 3 mm (0.12 in) long and 2 mm (0.079 in) wide and densely softly-hairs with three styles 3–4 mm (0.12–0.16 in) long.

== Taxonomy ==
The genus Whyanbeelia and the species Whyanbeelia terrae-reginae were first formally described in 1976 by Herbert Kenneth Airy Shaw and Bernard Hyland in the Kew Bulletin, from specimens collected in the Whyanbeel Nature Reserve. The genus name(Whyanbeelia), is derived from an aboriginal name for the type location.

== Distribution and habitat ==
This rainforest tree grows in rainforest between the Daintree and Johnstone Rivers at altitudes between 100 and 400 m (330 and 1,310 ft), in north-eastern Queensland.
