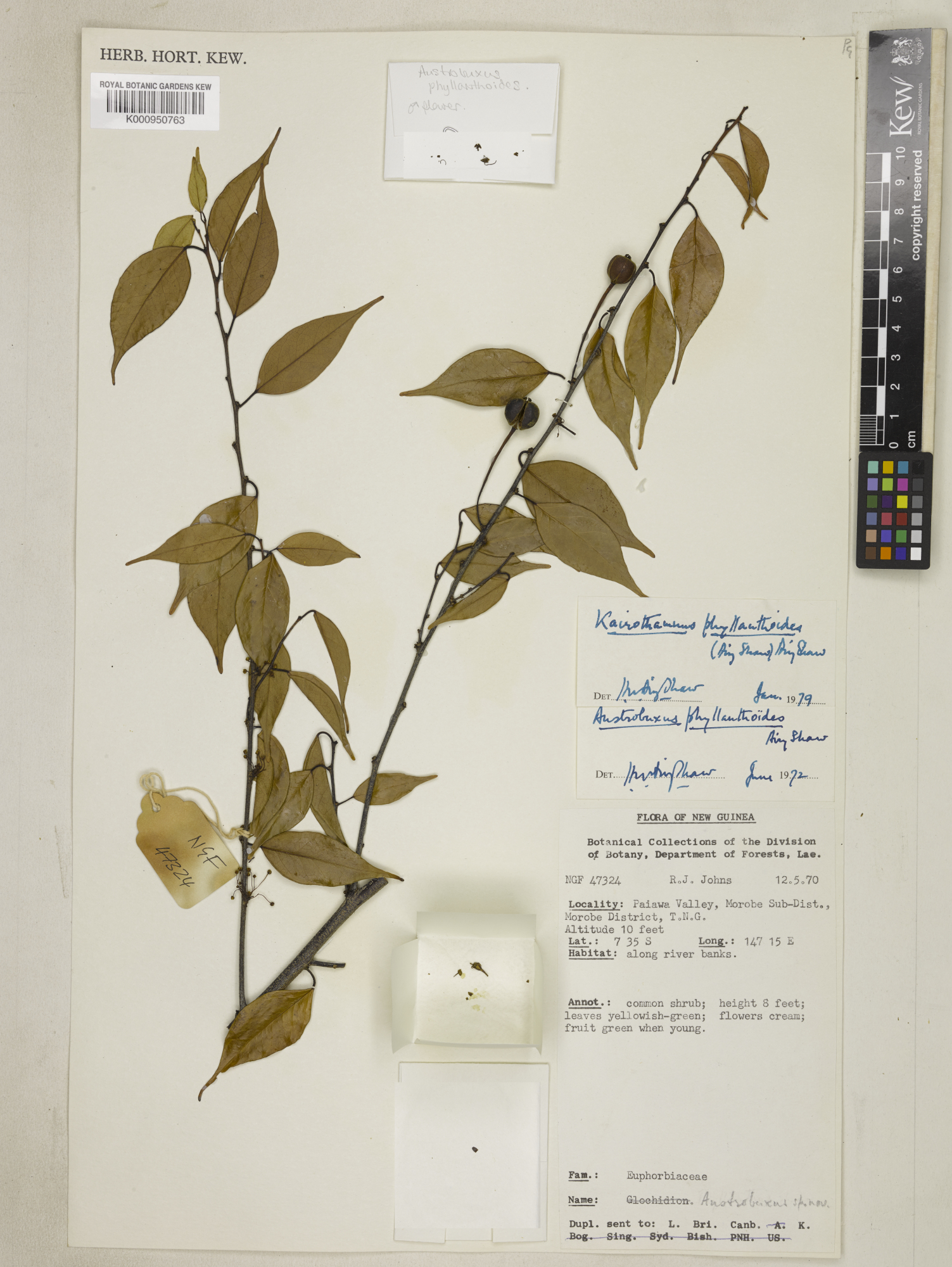

Conservation status
- Endangered (IUCN 3.1)

Scientific classification
- Kingdom: Plantae
- Clade: Tracheophytes
- Clade: Angiosperms
- Clade: Eudicots
- Clade: Rosids
- Order: Malpighiales
- Family: Picrodendraceae
- Tribe: Caletieae
- Subtribe: Pseudanthinae
- Genus: Kairothamnus; Airy Shaw
- Species: K. phyllanthoides

Binomial name
- Kairothamnus phyllanthoides (Airy Shaw) Airy Shaw

Synonyms
- Austrobuxus phyllanthoides Airy Shaw

= Kairothamnus =

Genus of flowering plants

Kairothamnus is a genus of plants under the family Picrodendraceae described as a genus in 1980. The only known species is Kairothamnus phyllanthoides, endemic to Morobe Province in Papua New Guinea.

== See also ==
- Taxonomy of the Picrodendraceae
