= Voatamalo =

Scientific classification
- Kingdom: Plantae
- Clade: Tracheophytes
- Clade: Angiosperms
- Clade: Eudicots
- Clade: Rosids
- Order: Malpighiales
- Family: Picrodendraceae
- Subtribe: Mischodontinae
- Genus: Voatamalo; Capuron ex Bosser

Genus of flowering plants

Voatamalo is a plant genus in the family Picrodendraceae first described as a genus in 1976.

The entire genus is endemic to Madagascar.

species

1. Voatamalo capuronii Bosser
2. Voatamalo eugenioides Capuron ex Bosser

== See also ==
- Taxonomy of the Picrodendraceae
