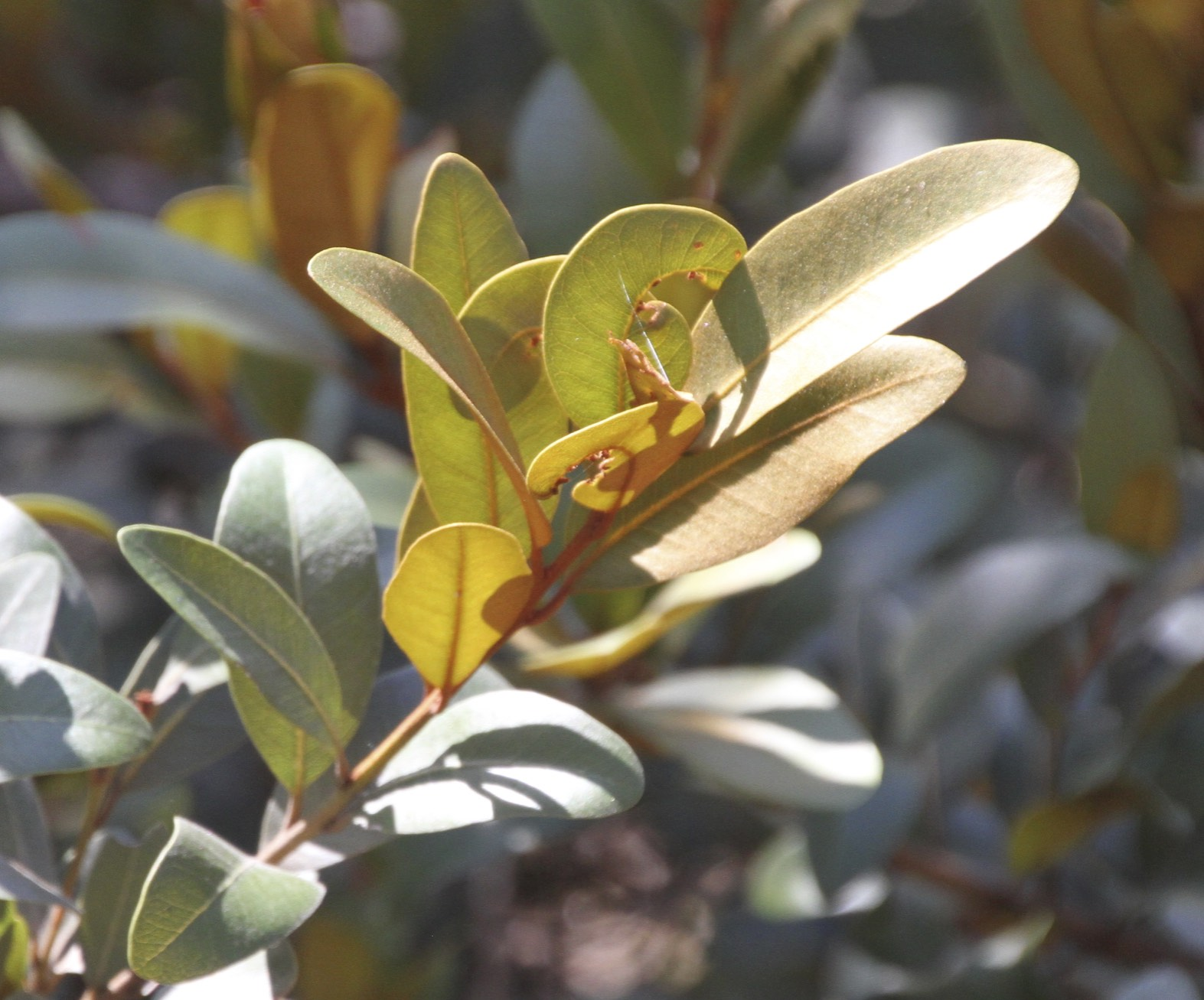
- Neoroepera buxifolia in Canal Creek, Queensland, Australia.

Scientific classification
- Kingdom: Plantae
- Clade: Embryophytes
- Clade: Tracheophytes
- Clade: Spermatophytes
- Clade: Angiosperms
- Clade: Eudicots
- Clade: Rosids
- Order: Malpighiales
- Family: Picrodendraceae
- Tribe: Caletieae
- Subtribe: Pseudanthinae
- Genus: Neoroepera; Müll.Arg. & F.Muell.

Type species
- Neoroepera buxifolia Müll.Arg. & F.Muell.

= Neoroepera =

Genus of flowering plants

Neoroepera is a genus of flowering plants in the family Picrodendraceae, first described in 1866. The two species in the genus are endemic to the State of Queensland in northeastern Australia.

Species

- Neoroepera banksii Benth. – Shire of Cook
- Neoroepera buxifolia Müll.Arg. – Gladstone District
