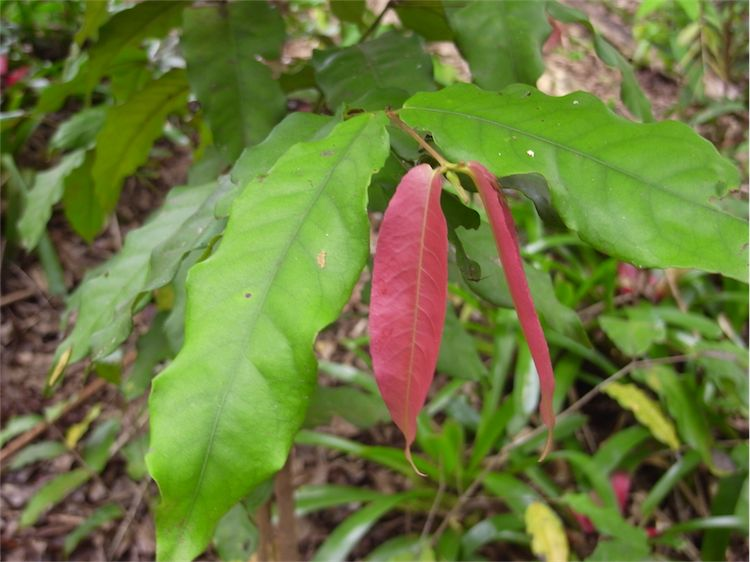

Conservation status
- Endangered (EPBC Act)
- Endangered (NCA)

Scientific classification
- Kingdom: Plantae
- Clade: Tracheophytes
- Clade: Angiosperms
- Clade: Eudicots
- Clade: Rosids
- Order: Malpighiales
- Family: Picrodendraceae
- Tribe: Caletieae
- Subtribe: Dissiliariinae
- Genus: Sankowskya; P.I.Forst.
- Species: S. stipularis

Binomial name
- Sankowskya stipularis P.I.Forst.

= Sankowskya =

Genus of plants endemic to Queensland

Sankowskya is a genus of plants endemic to Queensland, Australia. The genus contains only one species, Sankowskya stipularis, which was first described in 1995 and has been given the conservation status of 'endangered'.

== Description ==
Sankowskya stipularis is a small tree growing to about 15 m (49 ft) tall with a straight cylindrical trunk up to 10 cm (3.9 in) diameter. The bark is pale, smooth and without distinctive features. The young twigs have scattered hairs but become glabrous as they mature; new leaves are pink or red, becoming dark green on both sides. Stipules are present and may reach up to 3.5 cm (1.4 in) in length. The leaves are attached to the twigs with petioles about 5 mm (0.20 in) long, the leaf blades are lanceolate to elliptic with up to 30 rounded teeth on each edge. They are 5 to 18 cm (2.0 to 7.1 in) long and 1.5 to 6.5 cm (0.59 to 2.56 in) wide with seven to ten lateral veins either side of the midrib.

=== Flowers ===
Inflorescences occur in the leaf axils towards the ends of the branches, and may have only male flowers, only female flowers, or both. Female inflorescences consist of one or two flowers while male inflorescences are glomerules i.e. small dense clusters of stemless flowers. Female flowers have nil petals and three overlapping sepals, three styles and a three-locular ovary, with each locule having two ovules. Male flowers have nil petals, four sepals in two rows and 12–15 stamens.

=== Fruit ===
The fruit is a green to brown, globose or cylindrical capsule up to 15 mm (0.59 in) long and 11 mm (0.43 in) wide, with the calyx lobes persisting at the base and the three styles persisting at the apex. It contains a number of pale brown, smooth seeds about 8 mm (0.31 in) long and 5 mm (0.20 in) wide.

=== Phenology ===
Flowing and fruiting occurs throughout the year, with a peak of activity in late spring and summer, i.e. November to January.

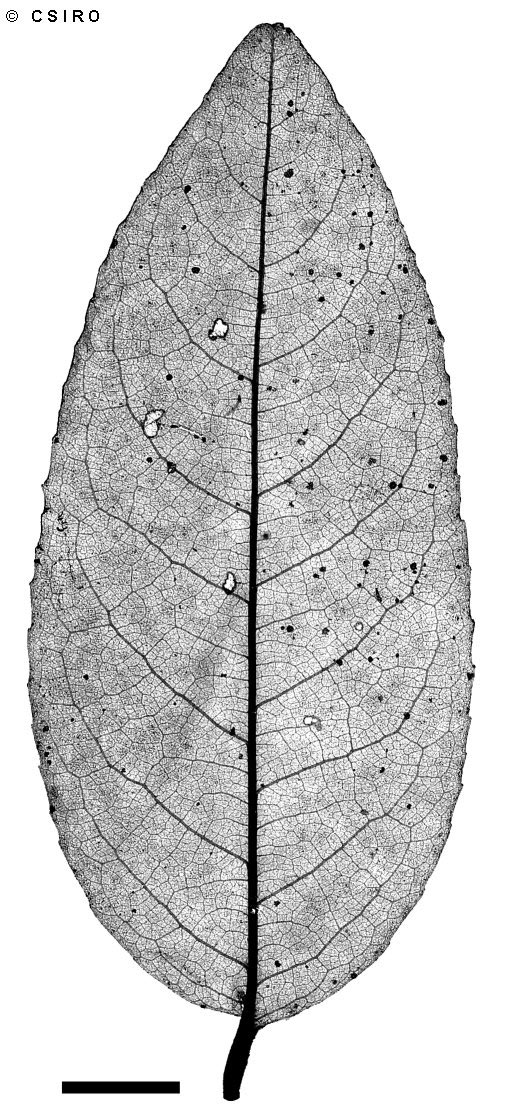
Xray of a leaf of this species

== Taxonomy ==
This species first became known to botanical science in 1989, when specimens of the plant were collected by plant collector and grower Gary Sankowsky, who has provided numerous collections of various taxa to Australian herbaria. The plant was formally described in 1995 by botanist Paul Irwin Forster, who erected the new genus Sankowskya to accommodate it, and placed it in the subtribe Dissiliariinae of the Euphorbiaceae family. The subtribe and its child taxa were later moved to Picrodendraceae.

=== Etymology ===
The generic name Sankowskya was chosen by Forster in recognition of the collector of the original specimens, Gary Sankowsky. The species epithet stipularis is a reference to the plant's large conspicuous stipules.

== Distribution and habitat ==
It was originally thought that this plant was restricted an extremely small area near Julatten, but in 2014 a specimen was collected near the coast north of Palmer Point, about 30 km (19 mi) southeast of Cairns and about 90 km (56 mi) southeast of all other collections. In the Julatten area it inhabits swampy rainforest that is subject to seasonal waterlogging.

The area of occupancy (Note: For a definition of Area of Occupancy see this page at the Atlas of Living Australia) of the Julatten population is estimated to be just 28 km^{2} (11 sq mi). The altitudinal range of that population is from about 390 m (1,280 ft) to about 440 m (1,440 ft).

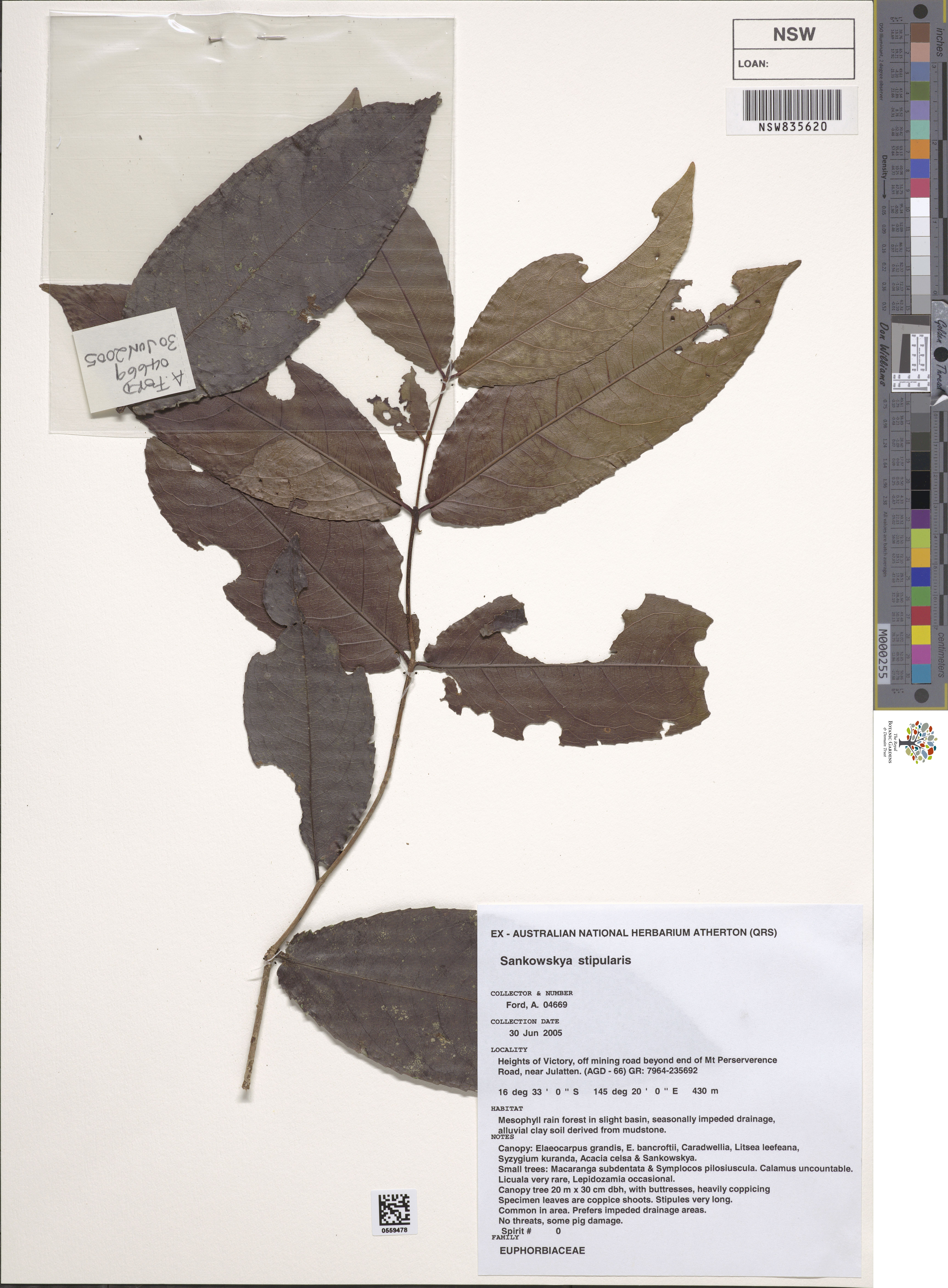
Herbarium specimen

== Conservation ==
In his protologue, Forster pointed out that the habitat of the species was not only small but may be subject to residential development. He stated the urgent need for a management plan and recommended that the plant be given a classification of 2E, (Note: Based on the conservation coding system developed and published by John D. Briggs in his book Rare or Threatened Australian Plants) which identifies the plant as having a restricted range and being at risk of becoming extinct. As of September 2025, the species is classified as endangered under both the Australian Government's EPBC Act and the Queensland Government's Nature Conservation Act.

While much of the plant's range is on freehold land, it is also present at the Thylogale Nature Refuge, a privately owned sanctuary dedicated to conservation of local flora and fauna.
