= Stachyandra =

Scientific classification
- Kingdom: Plantae
- Clade: Tracheophytes
- Clade: Angiosperms
- Clade: Eudicots
- Clade: Rosids
- Order: Malpighiales
- Family: Picrodendraceae
- Tribe: Picrodendreae
- Subtribe: Mischodontinae
- Genus: Stachyandra; J.-F.Leroy ex Radcl.-Sm.

Genus of flowering plants

Stachyandra is a plant genus in the family Picrodendraceae first described as a genus in 1990.

The entire genus is endemic to Madagascar.

species

1. Stachyandra imberbis (Airy Shaw) Radcl.-Sm.
2. Stachyandra merana (Airy Shaw) J.-F.Leroy ex Radcl.-Sm.
3. Stachyandra rufibarbis (Airy Shaw) Radcl.-Sm.
4. Stachyandra viticifolia (Airy Shaw) Radcl.-Sm.

== See also ==
- Taxonomy of the Picrodendraceae
