= Paradrypetes =

Scientific classification
- Kingdom: Plantae
- Clade: Tracheophytes
- Clade: Angiosperms
- Clade: Eudicots
- Clade: Rosids
- Order: Malpighiales
- Family: Rhizophoraceae
- Genus: Paradrypetes; Kuhlm.

Species
- P. ilicifolia Kuhlm. (type); P. subintegrifolia G.M.Levin; List source

Genus of flowering plants

Paradrypetes is a plant genus under the family Rhizophoraceae. It includes two species endemic to Brazil. It is sometimes included in the Picrodendraceae and was formerly included in the family Euphorbiaceae.
