= Aristogeitonia =

Scientific classification
- Kingdom: Plantae
- Clade: Tracheophytes
- Clade: Angiosperms
- Clade: Eudicots
- Clade: Rosids
- Order: Malpighiales
- Family: Picrodendraceae
- Tribe: Picrodendreae
- Subtribe: Mischodontinae
- Genus: Aristogeitonia; Prain

Synonyms
- Paragelonium Leandri

Genus of flowering plants

Aristogeitonia is a plant genus in the family Picrodendraceae, described as a genus by David Prain in 1908. It is native to Africa and Madagascar.

== species ==
Seven species are accepted.

1. Aristogeitonia gabonica Breteler – Gabon
2. Aristogeitonia limoniifolia Prain – Angola
3. Aristogeitonia lophirifolia Radcl.-Sm. – Madagascar
4. Aristogeitonia magnistipula Radcl.-Sm. – Tanzania
5. Aristogeitonia monophylla Airy Shaw – Tanzania, Kenya
6. Aristogeitonia perrieri (Leandri) Radcl.-Sm. – Madagascar
7. Aristogeitonia uapacifolia Radcl.-Sm. – Madagascar (Toliara Province)

== See also ==
- Taxonomy of the Picrodendraceae
