= Choriceras =

Scientific classification
- Kingdom: Plantae
- Clade: Tracheophytes
- Clade: Angiosperms
- Clade: Eudicots
- Clade: Rosids
- Order: Malpighiales
- Family: Picrodendraceae
- Tribe: Caletieae
- Subtribe: Dissiliariinae
- Genus: Choriceras; Baill.

Genus of flowering plants

Choriceras is a genus of plants in the family Picrodendraceae first described as a genus in 1874.

Choriceras is native to New Guinea and to northern Australia.

Species

1. Choriceras majus Airy Shaw - Queensland
2. Choriceras tricorne (Benth.) Airy Shaw - New Guinea, Northern Territory, Queensland
