= Oldfieldia =

Scientific classification
- Kingdom: Plantae
- Clade: Tracheophytes
- Clade: Angiosperms
- Clade: Eudicots
- Clade: Rosids
- Order: Malpighiales
- Family: Picrodendraceae
- Tribe: Picrodendreae
- Subtribe: Paiveusinae
- Genus: Oldfieldia; Benth. & Hook.f.

Synonyms
- Paivaeusa Welw. ex Benth.; Cecchia Chiov.

Genus of flowering plants

Oldfieldia is a plant genus under the family Picrodendraceae, the only member of its subtribe (Paiveusinae). It was described as a genus in 1850.

Oldfieldia is native to Africa.

Species

Oldfieldia is after Richard Albert Kearns Oldfield (R.A.K Oldfield) the British plant collector in Nigeria and Sierra Leone and surgeon on the 1832-1834 Niger River expedition with Laird and Lauder

1. Oldfieldia africana Benth. & Hook.f. - Ivory Coast, Liberia, Sierra Leone, Gabon, Cameroon, Central African Republic, Republic of the Congo
2. Oldfieldia dactylophylla (Welw. ex Oliv.) J.Léonard - Democratic Republic of the Congo, Tanzania, Zambia, Angola
3. Oldfieldia macrocarpa J.Léonard - Democratic Republic of the Congo
4. Oldfieldia somalensis (Chiov.) Milne-Redh - Somali, Kenya, Tanzania, Mozambique
