= Oenoe (Argolis) =

Town in Argeia

Coordinates: 37°36′34″N 22°33′53″E

Oenoe or Oinoe (Ancient Greek: Οἰνόη) or Oene or Oine (Οἴνη) or Oenoa or Oinoa (Οἰνώα) was a small town in the Argeia, west of Argos, on the left bank of the river Charadrus, and on the southern (the Prinus) of the two roads leading from Argos to Mantineia. Above the town was the mountain Artemisium (Malevós), with a temple of Artemis on the summit, worshipped by the inhabitants of Oenoe under the name of Oenoatis (Οἰνωᾶτις). The town was named by Diomedes after his grandfather Oeneus, who died here. Another mythical event related to this city is that it was considered to be the place where the Ceryneian Hind was found and captured by Heracles in one of his 12 Labors, after a year of pursuit.

In the neighbourhood of this town the Athenians and Argives gained a victory over the Lacedaemonians in the lead up to the Peloponnesian War (c. 456 BCE).

The site of Oenoe is located near modern Merkouri (Merkourion).
