= Scagea =

Scientific classification
- Kingdom: Plantae
- Clade: Tracheophytes
- Clade: Angiosperms
- Clade: Eudicots
- Clade: Rosids
- Order: Malpighiales
- Family: Picrodendraceae
- Tribe: Caletieae
- Subtribe: Pseudanthinae
- Genus: Scagea; McPherson

Genus of flowering plants

Scagea is a genus of plants under the family Picrodendraceae described as a genus in 1986.

The entire genus is endemic to New Caledonia.

== List of species ==
1. Scagea depauperata (Baill.) McPherson
2. Scagea oligostemon (Guillaumin) McPherson
