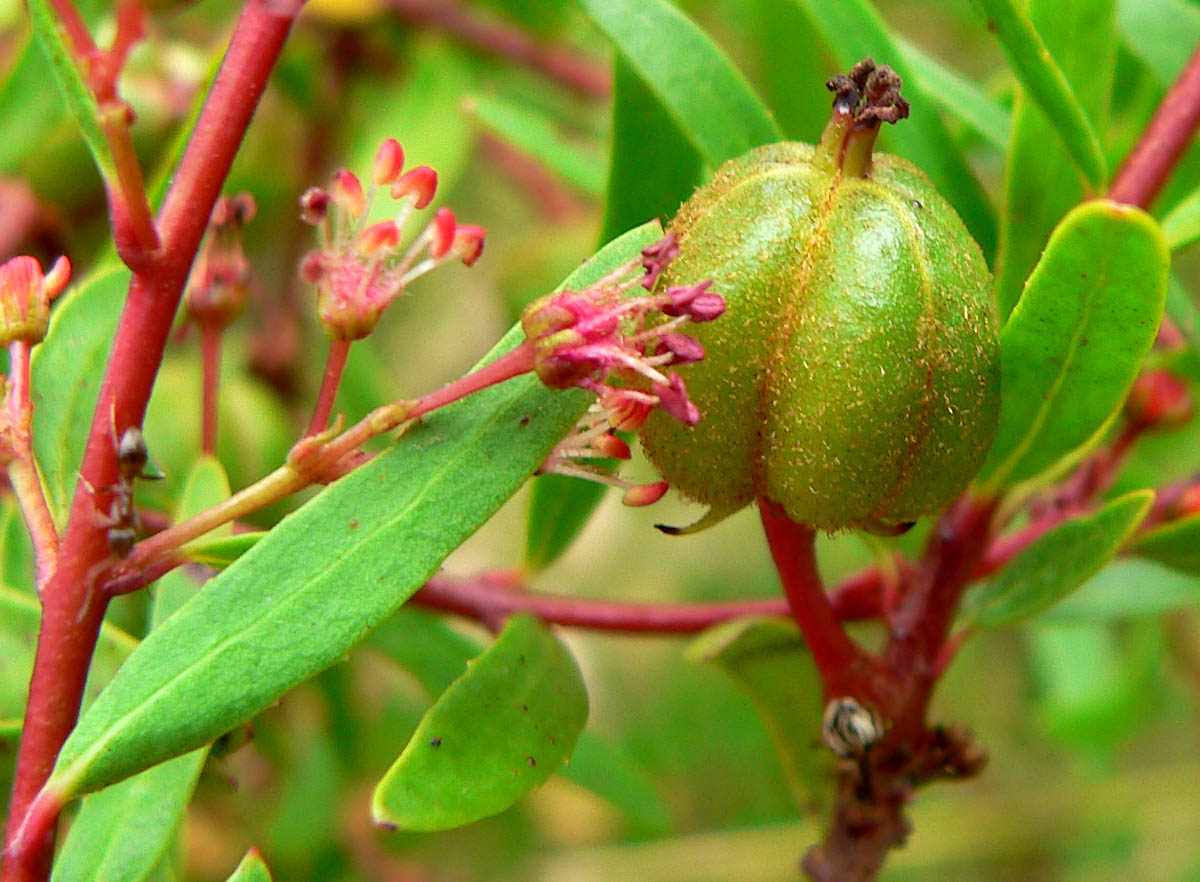
- Tetracoccus dioicus

Scientific classification
- Kingdom: Plantae
- Clade: Tracheophytes
- Clade: Angiosperms
- Clade: Eudicots
- Clade: Rosids
- Order: Malpighiales
- Family: Picrodendraceae; Small

Tribes
- Caletieae; Picrodendreae; Podocalyceae

= Picrodendraceae =

Picrodendraceae Temporal range: Paleocene - recent

Family of flowering plants

Picrodendraceae is a family of flowering plants, consisting of 80 species in 25 genera. These are subtropical to tropical and found in New Guinea, Australia, New Caledonia, Madagascar, continental Africa, and tropical America. Its closest relatives are Phyllanthaceae.

This family used to be known as the subfamily Oldfieldioideae of the Euphorbiaceae.

== Taxonomy ==
The family contains about 80 species organised into 24 genera (or three tribes of ten subtribes).

=== Genera ===
25 genera are accepted.

- Androstachys Prain
- Aristogeitonia Prain
- Austrobuxus Miq.
- Choriceras Baill.
- Dissiliaria F.Muell. ex Baill.
- Hyaenanche Lamb. & Vahl
- Kairothamnus Airy Shaw
- Longetia Baill.
- Micrantheum Desf.
- Mischodon Thwaites
- Neoroepera Müll.Arg.
- Oldfieldia Benth. & Hook.f.
- Parodiodendron Hunz.
- Petalostigma F.Muell.
- Picrodendron Planch.
- Piranhea Baill.
- Podocalyx Klotzsch
- Pseudanthus Sieber ex Spreng.
- Sankowskya P.I.Forst.
- Scagea McPherson
- Stachyandra J.-F.Leroy ex Radcl.-Sm.
- Stachystemon Planch.
- Tetracoccus Engelm. ex Parry
- Voatamalo Capuron ex Bosser
- Whyanbeelia Airy Shaw & B.Hyland
