= List of United Kingdom locations: Ho-Hoo =

The United Kingdom

This is part of the list of United Kingdom locations: a gazetteer of place names in the United Kingdom showing each place's locality and geographical coordinates.

== Ho ==
=== Hoa-Hog ===
Location	Locality	Coordinates (links to map & photo sources)	OS grid reference
Hoaden	Kent	51.28°N 01.23°E	TR2659
Hoar Cross	Staffordshire	52.80°N 01.82°W	SK1223
Hoarwithy	Herefordshire	51.95°N 02.67°W	SO545292
Hoath	Kent	51.33°N 01.15°E	TR2064
Hoath Corner	Kent	51.16°N 00.12°E	TQ4943
Hobarris	Shropshire	52.39°N 03.01°W	SO3178
Hobble End	Staffordshire	52.64°N 02.00°W	SK0005
Hobbles Green	Suffolk	52.14°N 00.48°E	TL7053
Hobbs Cross (Matching)	Essex	51.76°N 00.15°E	TL4910
Hobbs Cross (Theydon Garnon)	Essex	51.67°N 00.12°E	TQ4799
Hobbs Wall	Somerset	51.33°N 02.50°W	ST6560
Hob Hill	Cheshire	53.05°N 02.80°W	SJ4651
Hobkirk	Scottish Borders	55.38°N 02.66°W	NT5810
Hobroyd	Derbyshire	53.43°N 01.97°W	SK0293
Hobson	Durham	54.88°N 01.73°W	NZ1755
Hoby	Leicestershire	52.74°N 01.02°W	SK6617
Hoccombe	Somerset	51.05°N 03.27°W	ST1129
Hockenden	Bromley	51.39°N 00.14°E	TQ4968
Hockerill	Hertfordshire	51.85°N 00.16°E	TL4920
Hockering	Norfolk	52.67°N 01.06°E	TG0713
Hockering Heath	Norfolk	52.68°N 01.07°E	TG0814
Hockerton	Nottinghamshire	53.09°N 00.94°W	SK7156
Hockholler	North Somerset	50.98°N 03.19°W	ST1621
Hockholler Green	South Somerset	50.98°N 03.18°W	ST1721
Hockley	Solihull	52.40°N 01.60°W	SP2779
Hockley	Essex	51.59°N 00.65°E	TQ8492
Hockley	Kent	51.25°N 00.83°E	TQ9855
Hockley	Cheshire	53.34°N 02.12°W	SJ9283
Hockley	Staffordshire	52.59°N 01.67°W	SK2200
Hockley Heath	Warwickshire	52.34°N 01.78°W	SP1572
Hockliffe	Bedfordshire	51.92°N 00.59°W	SP9726
Hockwold cum Wilton	Norfolk	52.46°N 00.54°E	TL7388
Hockworthy	Devon	50.96°N 03.38°W	ST037194
Hocombe	Hampshire	50.99°N 01.38°W	SU4322
Hoddesdon	Hertfordshire	51.75°N 00.03°W	TL3608
Hoddlesden	Lancashire	53.69°N 02.44°W	SD7122
Hoden	Worcestershire	52.12°N 01.86°W	SP0947
Hodgefield	Staffordshire	53.08°N 02.15°W	SJ9054
Hodgehill	Birmingham	52.49°N 01.82°W	SP1288
Hodgehill	Cheshire	53.21°N 02.25°W	SJ8369
Hodgeston	Pembrokeshire	51.65°N 04.84°W	SS0399
Hodgeton	Angus	56.63°N 02.58°W	NO6449
Hodley	Powys	52.51°N 03.23°W	SO1691
Hodnet	Shropshire	52.84°N 02.58°W	SJ6128
Hodnetheath	Shropshire	52.83°N 02.58°W	SJ6127
Hodsock	Nottinghamshire	53.35°N 01.08°W	SK6185
Hodsoll Street	Kent	51.34°N 00.32°E	TQ6263
Hodson	Swindon	51.51°N 01.75°W	SU1780
Hodthorpe	Derbyshire	53.27°N 01.19°W	SK5476
Hoe	Surrey	51.19°N 00.44°W	TQ0945
Hoe	Hampshire	50.94°N 01.20°W	SU5617
Hoe	Norfolk	52.70°N 00.94°E	TF9916
Hoe Benham	Berkshire	51.41°N 01.41°W	SU4169
Hoe Gate	Hampshire	50.91°N 01.11°W	SU6213
Hoff	Cumbria	54.54°N 02.51°W	NY6717
Hoffleet Stow	Lincolnshire	52.91°N 00.15°W	TF2437
Hogaland	Shetland Islands	60.49°N 01.38°W	HU3479
Hogben's Hill	Kent	51.26°N 00.90°E	TR0356
Hogganfield	City of Glasgow	55.86°N 04.17°W	NS6466
Hoggard's Green	Suffolk	52.17°N 00.74°E	TL8856
Hoggeston	Buckinghamshire	51.91°N 00.83°W	SP8025
Hoggington	Wiltshire	51.29°N 02.25°W	ST8255
Hoggrill's End	Warwickshire	52.51°N 01.67°W	SP2291
Hog Hatch	Surrey	51.22°N 00.81°W	SU8348
Hoghton	Lancashire	53.72°N 02.59°W	SD6126
Hoghton Bottoms	Lancashire	53.73°N 02.57°W	SD6227
Hogley Green	Kirklees	53.55°N 01.82°W	SE1207
Hognaston	Derbyshire	53.04°N 01.65°W	SK2350
Hogpits Bottom	Hertfordshire	51.69°N 00.53°W	TL0101
Hogsthorpe	Lincolnshire	53.22°N 00.29°E	TF5372
Hogstock	Dorset	50.85°N 02.07°W	ST9506

=== Hol ===
Location	Locality	Coordinates (links to map & photo sources)	OS grid reference
Holbeach	Lincolnshire	52.80°N 00.01°E	TF3625
Holbeach Bank	Lincolnshire	52.82°N 00.00°E	TF3527
Holbeach Clough	Lincolnshire	52.82°N 00.01°W	TF3427
Holbeach Drove	Lincolnshire	52.68°N 00.04°W	TF3212
Holbeache	Worcestershire	52.40°N 02.32°W	SO7879
Holbeach Hurn	Lincolnshire	52.82°N 00.06°E	TF3927
Holbeach St Johns	Lincolnshire	52.74°N 00.01°W	TF3418
Holbeach St Marks	Lincolnshire	52.85°N 00.03°E	TF3731
Holbeach St Matthew	Lincolnshire	52.86°N 00.09°E	TF4132
Holbeck	Leeds	53.78°N 01.56°W	SE2932
Holbeck	North Yorkshire	54.18°N 01.12°W	SE574765
Holbeck	Nottinghamshire	53.25°N 01.19°W	SK5473
Holbeck Woodhouse	Nottinghamshire	53.25°N 01.19°W	SK5473
Holberrow Green	Worcestershire	52.22°N 01.97°W	SP0259
Holbeton	Devon	50.33°N 03.95°W	SX6150
Holborn	Camden	51.51°N 00.12°W	TQ3081
Holborough	Kent	51.33°N 00.43°E	TQ7062
Holbrook	Suffolk	51.98°N 01.14°E	TM1636
Holbrook	Sheffield	53.32°N 01.34°W	SK4481
Holbrook	Derbyshire	52.99°N 01.46°W	SK3644
Holbrook Common	South Gloucestershire	51.45°N 02.44°W	ST6973
Holbrook Moor	Derbyshire	53.00°N 01.46°W	SK3645
Holbrooks	Coventry	52.44°N 01.51°W	SP3383
Holburn	Northumberland	55.61°N 01.93°W	NU0436
Holbury	Hampshire	50.82°N 01.39°W	SU4303
Holcombe	Somerset	51.23°N 02.47°W	ST6749
Holcombe (East Devon)	Devon	50.73°N 02.97°W	SY3193
Holcombe (Teignbridge)	Devon	50.55°N 03.48°W	SX9574
Holcombe	Bury	53.64°N 02.33°W	SD7816
Holcombe Brook	Bury	53.62°N 02.34°W	SD7714
Holcombe Rogus	Devon	50.95°N 03.35°W	ST0518
Holcot	Northamptonshire	52.31°N 00.84°W	SP7969
Holdbrook	Enfield	51.67°N 00.03°W	TQ3699
Holden	Lancashire	53.93°N 02.35°W	SD7749
Holdenby	Northamptonshire	52.29°N 00.98°W	SP6967
Holden Fold	Oldham	53.55°N 02.13°W	SD9106
Holdenhurst	Bournemouth	50.75°N 01.83°W	SZ1295
Holder's Green	Essex	51.92°N 00.36°E	TL6328
Holders Hill	Barnet	51.59°N 00.22°W	TQ2390
Holdfast	Worcestershire	52.03°N 02.22°W	SO8537
Holdgate	Shropshire	52.502°N 02.647°W	SO5689
Holdingham	Lincolnshire	53.01°N 00.43°W	TF0547
Holditch	Dorset	50.81°N 02.93°W	ST3402
Holdsworth	Calderdale	53.75°N 01.88°W	SE0829
Holdworth	Sheffield	53.41°N 01.58°W	SK2891
Hole	Devon	50.92°N 04.37°W	SS3317
Hole	Bradford	53.82°N 01.95°W	SE0336
Hole Bottom	Calderdale	53.71°N 02.09°W	SD9424
Holefield	Scottish Borders	55.59°N 02.31°W	NT8034
Holehills	North Lanarkshire	55.87°N 03.98°W	NS7666
Holehouse	Derbyshire	53.42°N 02.00°W	SK0092
Hole-in-the-Wall	Herefordshire	51.94°N 02.56°W	SO6128
Holemill	Angus	56.57°N 02.84°W	NO4843
Holemoor	Devon	50.82°N 04.24°W	SS4205
Hole's Hole	Cornwall	50.46°N 04.21°W	SX4365
Holestone	Derbyshire	53.14°N 01.50°W	SK3361
Hole Street	West Sussex	50.91°N 00.37°W	TQ1414
Holewater	Devon	51.09°N 03.85°W	SS7035
Holford	Somerset	51.16°N 03.21°W	ST1541
Holgate	North Yorkshire	53.95°N 01.11°W	SE5851
Holker	Cumbria	54.18°N 02.98°W	SD3677
Holkham	Norfolk	52.95°N 00.81°E	TF8943
Hollacombe (Torridge)	Devon	50.80°N 04.31°W	SS3703
Hollacombe (Mid Devon)	Devon	50.78°N 03.70°W	SS8000
Hollacombe Hill	Devon	50.33°N 04.08°W	SX5250
Holland	Surrey	51.23°N 00.00°E	TQ4050
Holland	Orkney Islands	59.34°N 02.91°W	HY4851
Holland Fen	Lincolnshire	53.02°N 00.16°W	TF2349
Holland Lees	Lancashire	53.56°N 02.74°W	SD5108
Holland-on-Sea	Essex	51.79°N 01.18°E	TM2016
Hollands	Somerset	50.95°N 02.64°W	ST5517
Hollandstoun	Orkney Islands	59.36°N 02.44°W	HY7553
Hollee	Dumfries and Galloway	55.01°N 03.14°W	NY2769
Hollesley	Suffolk	52.04°N 01.42°E	TM3544
Hollicombe	Devon	50.44°N 03.56°W	SX8962
Hollies Common	Staffordshire	52.78°N 02.26°W	SJ8221
Hollinfare	Cheshire	53.40°N 02.46°W	SJ6990
Hollingbourne	Kent	51.26°N 00.63°E	TQ8455
Hollingbury	Brighton and Hove	50.85°N 00.13°W	TQ3108
Hollingdean	Brighton and Hove	50.83°N 00.14°W	TQ3106
Hollingdon	Buckinghamshire	51.93°N 00.73°W	SP8727
Hollingrove	East Sussex	50.95°N 00.40°E	TQ6920
Hollingthorpe	Wakefield	53.63°N 01.53°W	SE3115
Hollington	East Sussex	50.87°N 00.54°E	TQ7911
Hollington	Hampshire	51.32°N 01.39°W	SU4259
Hollington	Derbyshire	52.94°N 01.67°W	SK2239
Hollington	Staffordshire	52.94°N 01.92°W	SK0539
Hollington Cross	Hampshire	51.31°N 01.38°W	SU4358
Hollington Grove	Derbyshire	52.93°N 01.67°W	SK2238
Hollingwood	Derbyshire	53.26°N 01.38°W	SK4174
Hollingworth	Tameside	53.46°N 02.00°W	SK0096
Hollin Hall	Lancashire	53.83°N 02.13°W	SD9138
Hollin Park	Leeds	53.81°N 01.50°W	SE3336
Hollins	Cumbria	54.31°N 02.50°W	SD6791
Hollins	Bolton	53.54°N 02.45°W	SD7005
Hollins	Bury	53.56°N 02.28°W	SD8108
Hollins	Rochdale	53.55°N 02.19°W	SD8707
Hollins (Horton, near Biddulph Moor)	Staffordshire	53.11°N 02.12°W	SJ9257
Hollins (Kingsley)	Staffordshire	53.02°N 02.01°W	SJ9947
Hollins (Kidsgrove)	Staffordshire	53.07°N 02.27°W	SJ8253
Hollins	Derbyshire	53.23°N 01.52°W	SK3271
Hollinsclough	Staffordshire	53.19°N 01.91°W	SK0666
Hollins End	Sheffield	53.35°N 01.41°W	SK3984
Hollins Green	Cheshire	53.40°N 02.46°W	SJ6990
Hollinsgreen	Cheshire	53.16°N 02.40°W	SJ7363
Hollins Lane	Lancashire	53.95°N 02.77°W	SD4951
Hollins Lane	Shropshire	52.92°N 02.70°W	SJ5337
Hollinswood	Shropshire	52.67°N 02.44°W	SJ7009
Hollinthorpe	Leeds	53.77°N 01.42°W	SE3831
Hollinwood	Oldham	53.51°N 02.15°W	SD9002
Hollinwood	Shropshire	52.91°N 02.71°W	SJ5236
Hollis Green	Devon	50.86°N 03.30°W	ST0808
Hollis Head	Devon	50.79°N 03.43°W	SS9900
Hollocombe	Devon	50.88°N 03.94°W	SS6311
Hollocombe Town	Devon	50.88°N 03.96°W	SS6211
Holloway	Wiltshire	51.06°N 02.18°W	ST8730
Holloway	Berkshire	51.51°N 00.79°W	SU8480
Holloway	Derbyshire	53.10°N 01.52°W	SK3256
Holloway Hill	Surrey	51.16°N 00.61°W	SU9742
Hollow Brook	Bath and North East Somerset	51.33°N 02.60°W	ST5860
Hollowell	Northamptonshire	52.33°N 01.00°W	SP6871
Hollow Meadows	Sheffield	53.38°N 01.64°W	SK2488
Hollowmoor Heath	Cheshire	53.20°N 02.78°W	SJ4868
Hollow Oak	Dorset	50.73°N 02.22°W	SY8493
Hollows	Dumfries and Galloway	55.09°N 02.97°W	NY3878
Hollow Street	Kent	51.33°N 01.18°E	TR2264
Holly Bank	Walsall	52.62°N 01.92°W	SK0503
Hollyberry End	Solihull	52.44°N 01.61°W	SP2683
Holly Brook	Somerset	51.22°N 02.71°W	ST5048
Hollybush	Worcestershire	52.02°N 02.35°W	SO7636
Hollybush	Torfaen	51.63°N 03.04°W	ST2893
Hollybush	Caerphilly	51.71°N 03.21°W	SO1603
Hollybush	South Ayrshire	55.39°N 04.54°W	NS3914
Holly Bush	Wrexham	52.99°N 02.89°W	SJ4044
Hollybush	City of Stoke-on-Trent	52.98°N 02.16°W	SJ8943
Hollybush Corner	Buckinghamshire	51.56°N 00.61°W	SU9686
Hollybush Corner	Suffolk	52.19°N 00.79°E	TL9159
Hollybushes	Kent	51.28°N 00.73°E	TQ9157
Hollybush Hill	Buckinghamshire	51.54°N 00.58°W	SU9884
Hollybush Hill	Essex	51.82°N 01.06°E	TM1118
Hollycroft	Leicestershire	52.54°N 01.39°W	SP4194
Holly Cross	Berkshire	51.51°N 00.84°W	SU8080
Holly End	Norfolk	52.63°N 00.20°E	TF4906
Holly Green	Buckinghamshire	51.72°N 00.88°W	SP7703
Holly Green	Worcestershire	52.06°N 02.20°W	SO8641
Holly Hill	North Yorkshire	54.39°N 01.75°W	NZ1600
Hollyhurst	Shropshire	52.56°N 02.78°W	SO4797
Hollyhurst	Warwickshire	52.46°N 01.45°W	SP3785
Hollym	East Riding of Yorkshire	53.70°N 00.02°E	TA3425
Hollywaste	Shropshire	52.37°N 02.53°W	SO6475
Hollywater	Hampshire	51.09°N 00.85°W	SU8034
Hollywood	Worcestershire	52.39°N 01.88°W	SP0877
Holmacott	Devon	51.03°N 04.14°W	SS5028
Holman Clavel	Somerset	50.93°N 03.11°W	ST2216
Holmbridge	Kirklees	53.55°N 01.83°W	SE1106
Holmbury St Mary	Surrey	51.18°N 00.41°W	TQ1144
Holmbush	Cornwall	50.33°N 04.76°W	SX0352
Holmbush	Dorset	50.81°N 02.90°W	ST3602
Holmcroft	Staffordshire	52.82°N 02.14°W	SJ9025
Holme	Bedfordshire	52.06°N 00.27°W	TL1842
Holme	Bradford	53.77°N 01.71°W	SE1931
Holme	Cambridgeshire	52.46°N 00.24°W	TL1987
Holme	Cumbria	54.19°N 02.73°W	SD5278
Holme	Kirklees	53.54°N 01.85°W	SE1005
Holme	North Lincolnshire	53.54°N 00.61°W	SE9206
Holme	North Yorkshire	54.23°N 01.46°W	SE3582
Holme	Nottinghamshire	53.12°N 00.80°W	SK8059
Holmebridge	Dorset	50.67°N 02.15°W	SY8986
Holme Chapel	Lancashire	53.74°N 02.19°W	SD8728
Holme Green	Bedfordshire	52.07°N 00.26°W	TL1943
Holme Green	Berkshire	51.39°N 00.82°W	SU8267
Holme Green	North Yorkshire	53.86°N 01.16°W	SE5541
Holme Hale	Norfolk	52.62°N 00.77°E	TF8807
Holme Hill	North East Lincolnshire	53.56°N 00.08°W	TA2709
Holme Lacy	Herefordshire	52.01°N 02.65°W	SO5535
Holme Lane	Nottinghamshire	52.92°N 01.07°W	SK6237
Holme Marsh	Herefordshire	52.18°N 02.96°W	SO3454
Holme Mills	Cumbria	54.19°N 02.73°W	SD5278
Holme-next-the-Sea	Norfolk	52.95°N 00.52°E	TF7043
Holme-on-Spalding-Moor	East Riding of Yorkshire	53.83°N 00.78°W	SE8038
Holme on the Wolds	East Riding of Yorkshire	53.90°N 00.54°W	SE9646
Holme Pierrepont	Nottinghamshire	52.94°N 01.07°W	SK6239
Holmer	Herefordshire	52.07°N 02.73°W	SO5042
Holmer Green	Buckinghamshire	51.66°N 00.69°W	SU9097
Holmes	Lancashire	53.65°N 02.86°W	SD4318
Holmes Chapel	Cheshire	53.19°N 02.36°W	SJ7667
Holmesdale	Derbyshire	53.29°N 01.46°W	SK3678
Holmesfield	Derbyshire	53.28°N 01.52°W	SK3277
Holme Slack	Lancashire	53.77°N 02.68°W	SD5531
Holmes's Hill	East Sussex	50.88°N 00.17°E	TQ5312
Holme St Cuthbert	Cumbria	54.81°N 03.40°W	NY1047
Holmeswood	Lancashire	53.63°N 02.86°W	SD4316
Holmethorpe	Surrey	51.24°N 00.16°W	TQ2851
Holme Wood	Bradford	53.77°N 01.71°W	SE1931
Holmewood	Derbyshire	53.18°N 01.35°W	SK4365
Holmfield	Calderdale	53.74°N 01.88°W	SE0828
Holmfirth	Kirklees	53.56°N 01.79°W	SE1408
Holmhead	East Ayrshire	55.45°N 04.27°W	NS5620
Holmhill	Dumfries and Galloway	55.23°N 03.77°W	NX8795
Holmisdale	Highland	57.43°N 06.70°W	NG1848
Holmley Common	Derbyshire	53.30°N 01.47°W	SK3579
Holm of Faray	Orkney Islands	59.23°N 02.83°W	HY526390
Holm of Grimbister	Orkney Islands	59.00°N 03.08°W	HY378134
Holm of Houton	Orkney Islands	58.91°N 03.19°W	HY314033
Holm of Huip	Orkney Islands	59.16°N 02.65°W	HY627311
Holm of Melby	Shetland Islands	60.30°N 01.65°W	HU190582
Holm of Skaw	Shetland Islands	60.83°N 00.77°W	HP667171
Holm of West Sandwick	Shetland Islands	60.58°N 01.21°W	HU432891
Holmpton	East Riding of Yorkshire	53.68°N 00.05°E	TA3623
Holmrook	Cumbria	54.37°N 03.43°W	SD0799
Holmsgarth	Shetland Islands	60.16°N 01.17°W	HU4642
Holmside	Durham	54.83°N 01.67°W	NZ2149
Holmsleigh Green	Devon	50.81°N 03.13°W	ST2002
Holms of Ire	Orkney Islands	59.30°N 02.62°W	HY646468
Holmston	South Ayrshire	55.45°N 04.61°W	NS3521
Holmwood Corner	Surrey	51.18°N 00.32°W	TQ1744
Holmwrangle	Cumbria	54.82°N 02.76°W	NY5148
Holne	Devon	50.50°N 03.83°W	SX7069
Holnest	Dorset	50.87°N 02.49°W	ST6509
Holnicote	Somerset	51.20°N 03.56°W	SS9146
Holsworthy	Devon	50.80°N 04.35°W	SS3403
Holsworthy Beacon	Devon	50.84°N 04.34°W	SS3508
Holt	Dorset	50.82°N 01.97°W	SU0203
Holt	Worcestershire	52.25°N 02.26°W	SO8262
Holt	Hampshire	51.28°N 00.95°W	SU7354
Holt	Wiltshire	51.34°N 02.20°W	ST8661
Holt	St Helens	53.41°N 02.78°W	SJ4891
Holt	Norfolk	52.89°N 01.09°E	TG0838
Holt	Wrexham	53.07°N 02.89°W	SJ4053
Holtby	York	53.97°N 00.97°W	SE6754
Holt End	Hampshire	51.14°N 01.05°W	SU6639
Holt End	Worcestershire	52.31°N 01.89°W	SP0769
Holt Fleet	Worcestershire	52.26°N 02.26°W	SO8263
Holt Green	Lancashire	53.52°N 02.92°W	SD3904
Holt Head	Kirklees	53.60°N 01.89°W	SE0712
Holt Heath	Dorset	50.83°N 01.91°W	SU0604
Holt Heath	Worcestershire	52.26°N 02.27°W	SO8163
Holt Hill	Kent	51.28°N 00.45°E	TQ7157
Holt Hill	Staffordshire	52.83°N 01.82°W	SK1226
Holton	Somerset	51.03°N 02.45°W	ST6826
Holton	Suffolk	52.33°N 01.52°E	TM4077
Holton	Oxfordshire	51.74°N 01.13°W	SP6006
Holton cum Beckering	Lincolnshire	53.31°N 00.33°W	TF1181
Holton-le-Clay	Lincolnshire	53.49°N 00.07°W	TA2802
Holton le Moor	Lincolnshire	53.45°N 00.37°W	TF0897
Holton St Mary	Suffolk	51.98°N 00.98°E	TM0536
Holt Park	Leeds	53.85°N 01.60°W	SE2640
Holt Pound	Hampshire	51.18°N 00.84°W	SU8143
Holts	Oldham	53.52°N 02.07°W	SD9503
Holtspur	Buckinghamshire	51.60°N 00.67°W	SU9290
Holt Wood	Dorset	50.84°N 01.95°W	SU0305
Holtye	East Sussex	51.13°N 00.07°E	TQ4539
Holway (Sandford Orcas)	Dorset	50.97°N 02.52°W	ST6320
Holway (Thorncombe)	Dorset	50.82°N 02.88°W	ST3803
Holway	Flintshire	53.27°N 03.24°W	SJ1776
Holway	Somerset	51.00°N 03.08°W	ST2423
Holwell	Somerset	51.20°N 02.40°W	ST7245
Holwell	Dorset	50.89°N 02.42°W	ST7011
Holwell	Oxfordshire	51.77°N 01.66°W	SP2309
Holwell	Bedfordshire	51.98°N 00.31°W	TL1633
Holwell	Leicestershire	52.79°N 00.91°W	SK7323
Holwellbury	Bedfordshire	51.99°N 00.31°W	TL1634
Holwick	Durham	54.62°N 02.15°W	NY9026
Holybourne	Hampshire	51.15°N 00.95°W	SU7340
Holy City	Devon	50.83°N 03.00°W	ST2904
Holy Cross	Worcestershire	52.40°N 02.11°W	SO9278
Holy Cross	North Tyneside	54.99°N 01.51°W	NZ3167
Holyfield	Essex	51.70°N 00.00°E	TL3803
Holyford	Devon	50.72°N 03.09°W	SY2392
Holyhead (Caergybi)	Isle of Anglesey	53.30°N 04.64°W	SH2482
Holy Island	Isle of Anglesey	53.29°N 04.62°W	SH253804
Holy Island	Northumberland	55.67°N 01.80°W	NU125419
Holy Isle	North Ayrshire	55.52°N 05.07°W	NS059300
Holylee	Scottish Borders	55.62°N 02.97°W	NT3937
Holymoorside	Derbyshire	53.21°N 01.50°W	SK3369
Holyport	Berkshire	51.48°N 00.71°W	SU8977
Holystone	Northumberland	55.31°N 02.08°W	NT9502
Holytown	North Lanarkshire	55.81°N 03.98°W	NS7660
Holy Vale	Isles of Scilly	49.91°N 06.29°W	SV9211
Holywell	Bedfordshire	51.83°N 00.53°W	TL0116
Holywell	Cambridgeshire	52.31°N 00.05°W	TL3370
Holywell	Cornwall	50.37°N 05.15°W	SW7658
Holywell	Dorset	50.83°N 02.58°W	ST5904
Holywell (Treffynnon)	Flintshire	53.26°N 03.23°W	SJ1875
Holywell	Gloucestershire	51.63°N 02.34°W	ST7693
Holywell	Herefordshire	52.06°N 02.92°W	SO3741
Holywell	Hertfordshire	51.64°N 00.42°W	TQ0995
Holywell	Northumberland	55.06°N 01.51°W	NZ3174
Holywell	Somerset	50.91°N 02.68°W	ST5213
Holywell	Warwickshire	52.29°N 01.72°W	SP1966
Holywell Green	Calderdale	53.66°N 01.88°W	SE0819
Holywell Lake	Somerset	50.97°N 03.28°W	ST1020
Holywell Row	Suffolk	52.36°N 00.49°E	TL7077
Holywood	Dumfries and Galloway	55.10°N 03.66°W	NX9480
Holywood	Down, Northern Ireland	54.636°N 05.845°W	

=== Hom-Hoo ===
Location	Locality	Coordinates (links to map & photo sources)	OS grid reference
Homedowns	Gloucestershire	51.98°N 02.11°W	SO9232
Homer	Shropshire	52.60°N 02.57°W	SJ6101
Homer Green	Sefton	53.51°N 02.99°W	SD3402
Homersfield	Suffolk	52.41°N 01.35°E	TM2885
Homerton	Hackney	51.54°N 00.05°W	TQ3585
Hom Green	Herefordshire	51.89°N 02.61°W	SO5822
Homington	Wiltshire	51.03°N 01.83°W	SU1226
Honeybourne	Worcestershire	52.09°N 01.84°W	SP1144
Honeychurch	Devon	50.80°N 03.95°W	SS6202
Honeydon	Bedfordshire	52.20°N 00.34°W	TL1358
Honey Hall	North Somerset	51.34°N 02.81°W	ST4361
Honey Hill	Berkshire	51.38°N 00.82°W	SU8266
Honey Hill	Kent	51.30°N 01.02°E	TR1161
Honeystreet	Wiltshire	51.34°N 01.85°W	SU1061
Honey Tye	Suffolk	51.97°N 00.83°E	TL9535
Honeywick	Bedfordshire	51.87°N 00.59°W	SP9721
Honicknowle	Devon	50.40°N 04.16°W	SX4658
Honiley	Warwickshire	52.34°N 01.64°W	SP2472
Honing	Norfolk	52.79°N 01.43°E	TG3227
Honingham	Norfolk	52.65°N 01.10°E	TG1011
Honington	Suffolk	52.33°N 00.80°E	TL9174
Honington	Warwickshire	52.07°N 01.62°W	SP2642
Honington	Lincolnshire	52.97°N 00.60°W	SK9443
Honiton	Devon	50.79°N 03.19°W	ST1600
Honkley	Wrexham	53.12°N 02.98°W	SJ3459
Honley	Kirklees	53.59°N 01.80°W	SE1311
Honley Moor	Kirklees	53.59°N 01.80°W	SE1311
Honnington	Shropshire	52.73°N 02.41°W	SJ7215
Honor Oak	Lewisham	51.44°N 00.05°W	TQ3574
Honor Oak Park	Lewisham	51.44°N 00.04°W	TQ3674
Honresfeld	Rochdale	53.64°N 02.09°W	SD9416
Hoo	Suffolk	52.18°N 01.30°E	TM256589
Hoo (Hoo St Werburgh)	Kent	51.40°N 00.56°E	TQ786706
Hoo (Minster)	Kent	51.32°N 01.28°E	TR2964
Hoober	Rotherham	53.47°N 01.38°W	SK4198
Hoobrook	Worcestershire	52.36°N 02.25°W	SO8374
Hood Green	Barnsley	53.51°N 01.53°W	SE3102
Hood Hill	Sheffield	53.46°N 01.45°W	SK3697
Hood Manor	Cheshire	53.38°N 02.63°W	SJ5888
Hooe	East Sussex	50.85°N 00.38°E	TQ6809
Hooe	Devon	50.34°N 04.10°W	SX5052
Hooe Common	East Sussex	50.8703°N 0.4067°E	TQ6910
Hoo End	Hertfordshire	51.85°N 00.28°W	TL1819
Hoofield	Cheshire	53.15°N 02.73°W	SJ5162
Hoo Green	Cheshire	53.33°N 02.43°W	SJ7182
Hoohill	Lancashire	53.82°N 03.03°W	SD3237
Hoo Hole	Calderdale	53.72°N 02.00°W	SE0025
Hook	Devon	50.84°N 02.99°W	ST3005
Hook	Cambridgeshire	52.51°N 00.09°E	TL4293
Hook	Pembrokeshire	51.76°N 04.94°W	SM9711
Hook	Wiltshire	51.55°N 01.90°W	SU0784
Hook	Hampshire	51.28°N 00.96°W	SU7254
Hook	Kingston upon Thames	51.36°N 00.30°W	TQ1864
Hook	East Riding of Yorkshire	53.71°N 00.84°W	SE7625
Hook-a-Gate	Shropshire	52.67°N 02.80°W	SJ4609
Hook Bank	Worcestershire	52.05°N 02.27°W	SO8140
Hooke	Dorset	50.79°N 02.66°W	ST5300
Hook End	Solihull	52.41°N 01.70°W	SP2080
Hook End	Essex	51.66°N 00.28°E	TQ5899
Hook End	Oxfordshire	51.52°N 01.04°W	SU6681
Hooker Gate	Gateshead	54.92°N 01.78°W	NZ1459
Hookgate	Staffordshire	52.91°N 02.38°W	SJ7435
Hook Green (Tunbridge Wells)	Kent	51.09°N 00.35°E	TQ6535
Hook Green (Gravesham)	Kent	51.37°N 00.35°E	TQ6467
Hook Green (Dartford)	Kent	51.40°N 00.31°E	TQ6170
Hook Heath	Surrey	51.30°N 00.59°W	SU9857
Hook Norton	Oxfordshire	51.99°N 01.49°W	SP3533
Hook Park	Hampshire	50.83°N 01.30°W	SU4904
Hook's Cross	Hertfordshire	51.86°N 00.15°W	TL2720
Hook Street	Gloucestershire	51.68°N 02.47°W	ST6799
Hook Street	Wiltshire	51.55°N 01.88°W	SU0884
Hooksway	West Sussex	50.93°N 00.84°W	SU8116
Hookway	Devon	50.77°N 03.63°W	SX8598
Hookwood	Surrey	51.16°N 00.19°W	TQ2642
Hoole	Cheshire	53.19°N 02.86°W	SJ4267
Hoole Bank	Cheshire	53.21°N 02.85°W	SJ4369
Hooley	Surrey	51.28°N 00.16°W	TQ2856
Hooley Bridge	Rochdale	53.60°N 02.22°W	SD8512
Hooley Brow	Rochdale	53.59°N 02.22°W	SD8511
Hooley Hill	Tameside	53.47°N 02.12°W	SJ9297
Hoo Meavy	Devon	50.46°N 04.07°W	SX5365
Hoop	Monmouthshire	51.75°N 02.71°W	SO5107
Hoopers Pool	Wiltshire	51.28°N 02.24°W	ST8354
Hoops	Devon	50.98°N 04.32°W	SS3723
Hoo St Werburgh	Kent	51.41°N 00.55°E	TQ7872
Hooton	Cheshire	53.29°N 02.96°W	SJ3678
Hooton Levitt	Rotherham	53.41°N 01.21°W	SK5291
Hooton Pagnell	Doncaster	53.56°N 01.27°W	SE4808
Hooton Roberts	Rotherham	53.46°N 01.27°W	SK4897
