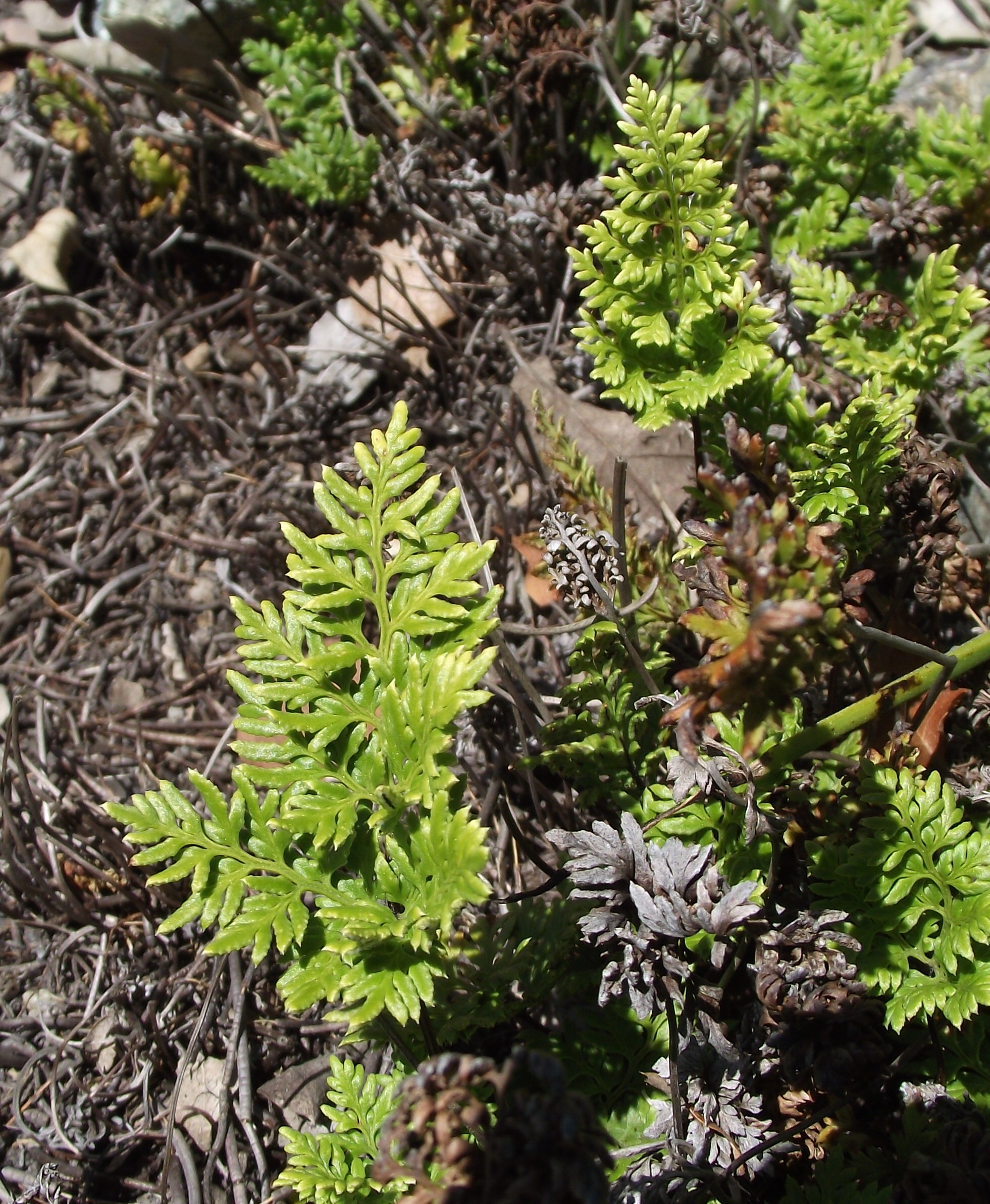

Conservation status
- Vulnerable (NatureServe)

Scientific classification
- Kingdom: Plantae
- Clade: Tracheophytes
- Division: Polypodiophyta
- Class: Polypodiopsida
- Order: Polypodiales
- Family: Pteridaceae
- Genus: Aspidotis
- Species: A. carlotta-halliae

Binomial name
- Aspidotis carlotta-halliae (W.H.Wagner & E.F. Gilbert) Lellinger

Synonyms
- Cheilanthes carlotta-halliae

= Aspidotis carlotta-halliae =

Species of fern

Aspidotis carlotta-halliae is a species of perennial fern known by the common names tufted lacefern and Carlotta Hall's lace fern. It is endemic to California, where it is found in the Central Coast Ranges and coastal hillsides, often on serpentine soils. This species is a fertile hybrid between Aspidotis californica and Aspidotis densa. The fern was named for fern collector Carlotta Case Hall, who coauthored the 1912 botanical guide A Yosemite Flora with her husband, botanist Harvey Monroe Hall.

== Description ==
In appearance it is intermediate between the two other ferns. It has leathery triangular leaves divided into many pairs of leaflets, which are each subdivided into many coarse, irregularly toothed segments. The stipe is very thin and dark. The undersides of the segments are lined with sori containing sporangia. It is found between 90 metres (300 ft) to 1,330 metres (4,360 ft) in elevation. It is often found growing under rocks.
