= Holywell =

Holywell may refer to:

== England ==
- Holywell, Bedfordshire
- Holywell, Cambridgeshire
- Holywell, Cornwall
- Holywell, Dorset
- Holywell, Eastbourne, East Sussex
- Holywell, Gloucestershire, a location in England
- Holywell, Herefordshire, a place in Herefordshire
- Holywell, Hertfordshire
- Holywell, Ashby-de-la-Zouch, Leicestershire
- Holywell, Lincolnshire
- Holywell, Northumberland, near Seaton Delaval
- Holywell, Oxford, Oxfordshire
- Holywell, Somerset, a location in England
- Holywell, Warwickshire, a location in England
- Holy Well, Malvern, Worcestershire

== Other places ==
- Holywell, County Fermanagh, Northern Ireland
- Holywell, Flintshire, Wales
- Holywell, Swords, Ireland

== See also ==
- Holywell Street (disambiguation)
- Holywells Ward, Ipswich, Suffolk, England
- Holy well
- East Holywell, a hamlet in Backworth, Tyne and Wear, England
- West Holywell, a hamlet in Backworth, Tyne and Wear, England
- Holly Wells (1991–2002), a victim of the Soham murders
- Hollywell, Queensland, Australia
