= Hollybush (disambiguation) =

Hollybush may refer to:

- Hollybush, an area of Newport, Wales, United Kingdom
- Hollybush, Caerphilly, a location in Wales
- Hollybush, East Ayrshire, a location in Scotland
- Hollybush, Torfaen, a location in Wales
- Hollybush, Stoke-on-Trent, a location in Staffordshire, England
- Hollybush, Worcestershire, United Kingdom
- Hollybush railway station, United Kingdom
- Hollybush, Kentucky, United States
- Hollybush, a common name for the plant Tetracoccus ilicifolius
- Hollybush Mansion, Glassboro, New Jersey, listed on the NRHP in Gloucester County

== See also ==
- Hollybush Hill
- Holly Bush
