= Honey Hill =

Honey Hill may refer to:

== Places ==
=== United Kingdom ===
- Honey Hill, Cambridge, a small elevation in Cambridgeshire, England
- Honey Hill, Kent, hamlet in Kent, England
- Honey Hill, Northamptonshire, a hill lying on the edge of the Northamptonshire Uplands, England

=== United States ===
- Honey Hill, a summit in Fairfield County, Connecticut
- Honey Hill, an elevation near Newport, New York
- Honey Hill, Oklahoma
- Honey Hill-Boyd's Neck Battlefield, South Carolina
  - Battle of Honey Hill, American Civil War battle

== Music ==
- "Honey Hill", a song by Johnny Hodges from the 1958 album Blues A-Plenty
