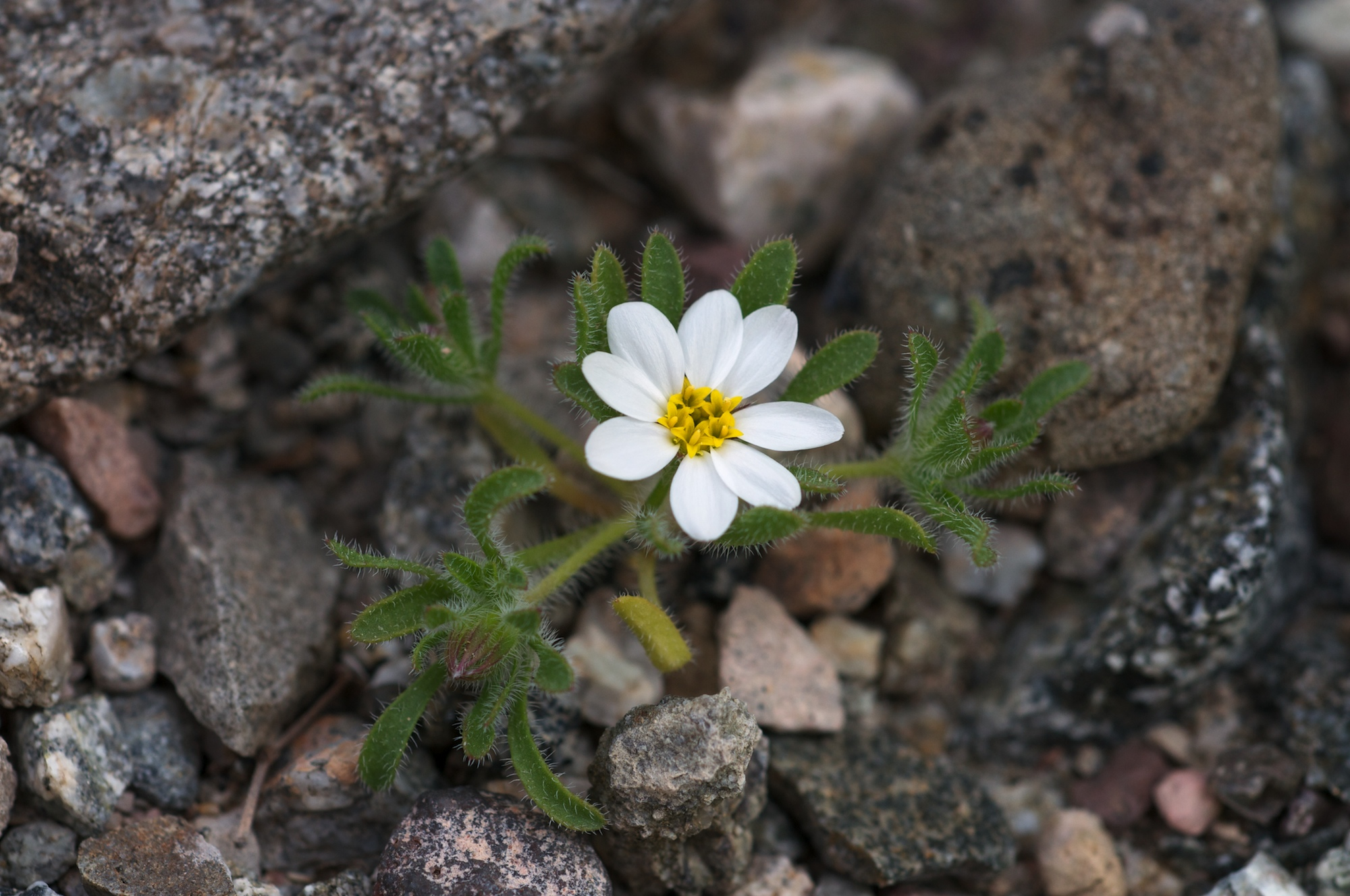

Scientific classification
- Kingdom: Plantae
- Clade: Tracheophytes
- Clade: Angiosperms
- Clade: Eudicots
- Clade: Asterids
- Order: Asterales
- Family: Asteraceae
- Genus: Monoptilon
- Species: M. bellioides

Binomial name
- Monoptilon bellioides (A.Gray) H.M.Hall

= Monoptilon bellioides =

Species of flowering plant

Monoptilon bellioides, the desert star, also called Mojave desertstar, is a desert flowering plant in the family Asteraceae.

== Description ==
Monoptilon bellioides is a short annual plant; in seasons with very little rainfall, the plant may only grow to 1–2 centimetres (1/2–3/4 in), if it grows at all, while in seasons of heavy rainfall, it can grow up to 25 cm (10 in) tall. The leaves are linear, 5–10 millimetres (3/16–3/8 in) long, with a blunt apex and stiff hairs.

The flowers are produced in dense inflorescences (capitula), 2 cm wide, with white ray florets and yellow disc florets in the center. The flowers open in the morning and close in the evening.

=== Similar species ===
Found in the same region, the fruit of Monoptilon bellidiforme is topped by one plume-tipped bristle.

== Distribution and habitat ==
It is native to stony and sandy plains in the Mojave Desert of California, the Sonoran Deserts of the Southwestern United States, and northwestern Mexico. It is very common in the northern, eastern, and southern parts of the desert.
