= Holly Bush =

Holly Bush may refer to:

- Holly Bush, Bollington, a pub in Cheshire, England
- Holly Bush Inn, Makeney, a pub in Derbyshire, England
- Holly Bush railway station, a former station in Monmouthshire, Wales
- The Holly Bush, Elstree, a former pub in Hertfordshire, England
- The Holly Bush, Hampstead, a pub in London, England
- Holly Bush, Wrexham, a location in Wales

== See also ==
- Hollybush (disambiguation)
