= Hook Street =

Hook Street is the name of two places in England:

- Hook Street, a village near Berkeley, Gloucestershire
- Hook Street, Wiltshire, a hamlet near Lydiard Tregoze
