= Hoe Benham =

Hamlet in Berkshire, England

Coordinates: 51.428390°N 1.412106°W

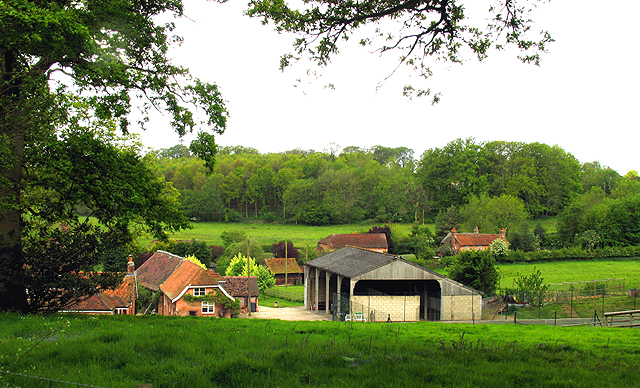
- Hoe Benham Farm

- Location within Berkshire
- OS grid reference: SU410695
- Metropolitan borough: West Berkshire
- Metropolitan county: Berkshire
- Region: South East
- Country: England
- Sovereign state: United Kingdom
- Post town: NEWBURY
- Postcode district: RG20
- Dialling code: 01635
- Police: Thames Valley
- Fire: Royal Berkshire
- Ambulance: South Central
- UK Parliament: Newbury

Hoe Benham is a hamlet in Berkshire, England, and part of the civil parish of Welford.

The settlement lies near to the A4 and B4000 roads, and is located approximately 4 1/2 miles (7.2 km) north-west of Newbury.

== Geography ==
Hoe Benham has a nature reserve on the Northern edge of the hamlet called Sole Common Pond.
