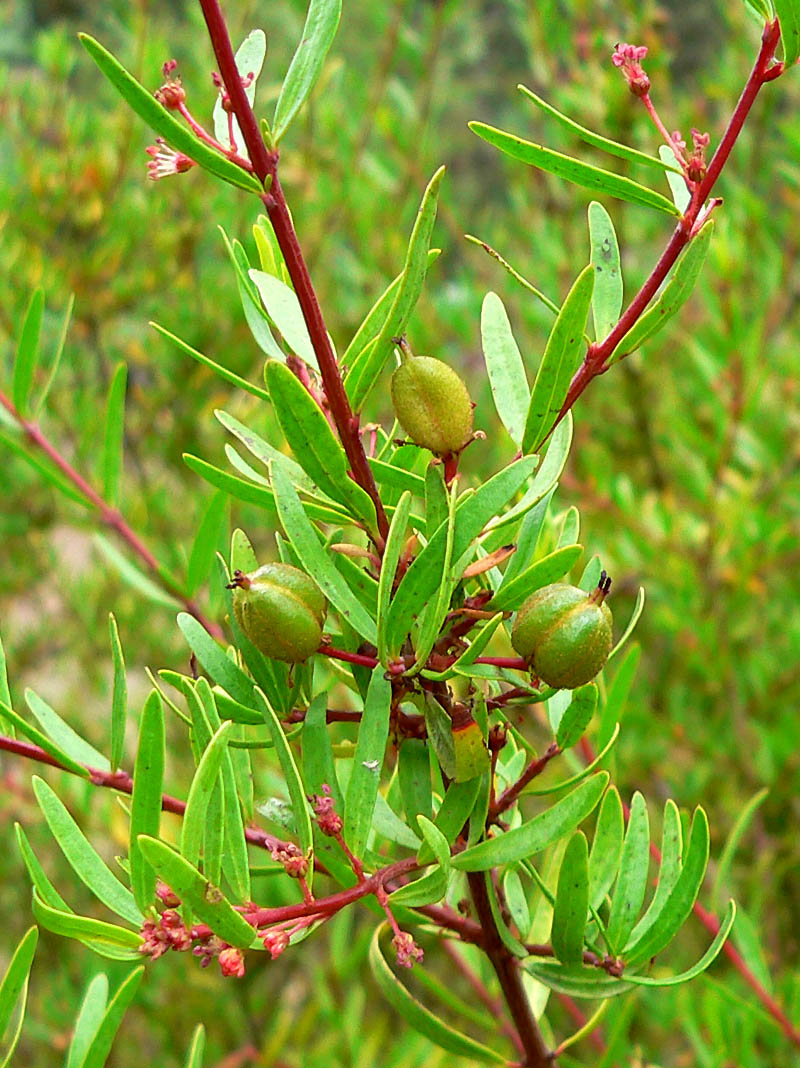
- Tetracoccus dioicus

Scientific classification
- Kingdom: Plantae
- Clade: Tracheophytes
- Clade: Angiosperms
- Clade: Eudicots
- Clade: Rosids
- Order: Malpighiales
- Family: Picrodendraceae
- Tribe: Podocalyceae
- Subtribe: Tetracoccinae
- Genus: Tetracoccus; Engelm. ex Parry

Type species
- Tetracoccus dioicus Parry

Synonyms
- Halliophytum I.M.Johnst.

= Tetracoccus (plant) =

Genus of flowering plants

Tetracoccus is a plant genus under the family Picrodendraceae. Shrubby-spurge is a common name for plants in this genus. They are dioecious, often hairy shrubs.

It was first described in 1885 by Charles Christopher Parry. Its name means, from Greek "four seed" (tetra meaning "four" and kokkos, "kernel, grain").

== Distribution ==
The genus is native to the southwestern United States and northern Mexico, with species in desert or chaparral habitats.

== Species ==
Species include:

- Tetracoccus capensis (I.M.Johnst.) Croizat — endemic to Baja California Sur state (México).
- Tetracoccus dioicus Parry — endemic to the Peninsular Ranges in northwestern Baja California state (México); and southern California (U.S.) within San Diego, Orange, and Riverside Counties.
- Tetracoccus fasciculatus (S.Watson) Croizat — Mexico (Chihuahua, Durango, Nuevo León, and Puebla states).
- Tetracoccus hallii Brandegee — Mojave Desert and Sonoran Desert in California, Nevada, and Arizona (U.S.), and Baja California state (México). Sometimes treated as a variety under T. fasciculatus.
- Tetracoccus ilicifolius Coville & Gilman — endemic to Death Valley National Park, in the Mojave Desert and eastern Inyo County, California.

== See also ==
- Taxonomy of the Picrodendraceae
