= Beck Row, Holywell Row and Kenny Hill =

Civil parish in Suffolk, England

Coordinates: 52.373°N 0.478°E

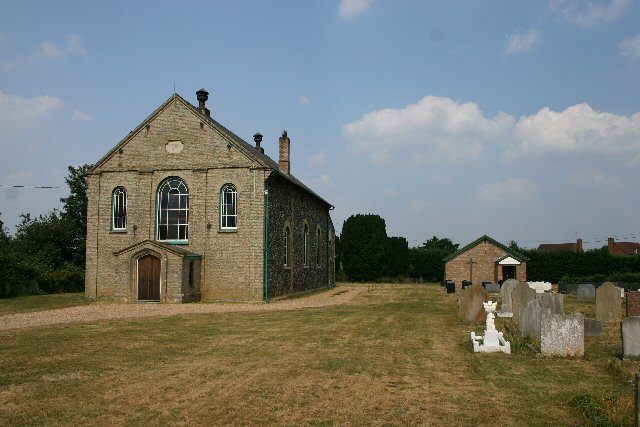
- Former Methodist Church, Beck Row

- Location within Suffolk
- Population: 4,048 (2001 census)
- Civil parish: Beck Row, Holywell Row and Kenny Hill
- District: West Suffolk
- Shire county: Suffolk
- Region: East
- Country: England
- Sovereign state: United Kingdom
- Post town: BURY ST. EDMUNDS
- Postcode district: IP28
- Dialling code: 01638
- UK Parliament: West Suffolk

Beck Row, Holywell Row and Kenny Hill is a civil parish in the West Suffolk district of Suffolk, England. According to the 2001 census, it had a population of 4,048. The parish covers an area to the north of Mildenhall, including Beck Row, Holywell Row and Kenny Hill. The American military base at RAF Mildenhall is one of the main employers of this parish and is located in Beck Row, with farming and agriculture coming in second. Beck Row has an old Methodist Church where many of the locals are buried. The area around the parish includes heavily forested and heavily cultivated land. It is located in the famous fertile farming area of England; The Fens. A popular pub in the town of Beck Row is The Bird in Hand. There is also a Londis grocery store, beauty shop, Kebab restaurant, and a pet store. Until 2019 it was in Forest Heath district.

The parish was formed on 1 April 1999, having previously been part of Mildenhall parish.
