= Evershot railway station =

Disused railway station in Dorset, England

Evershot
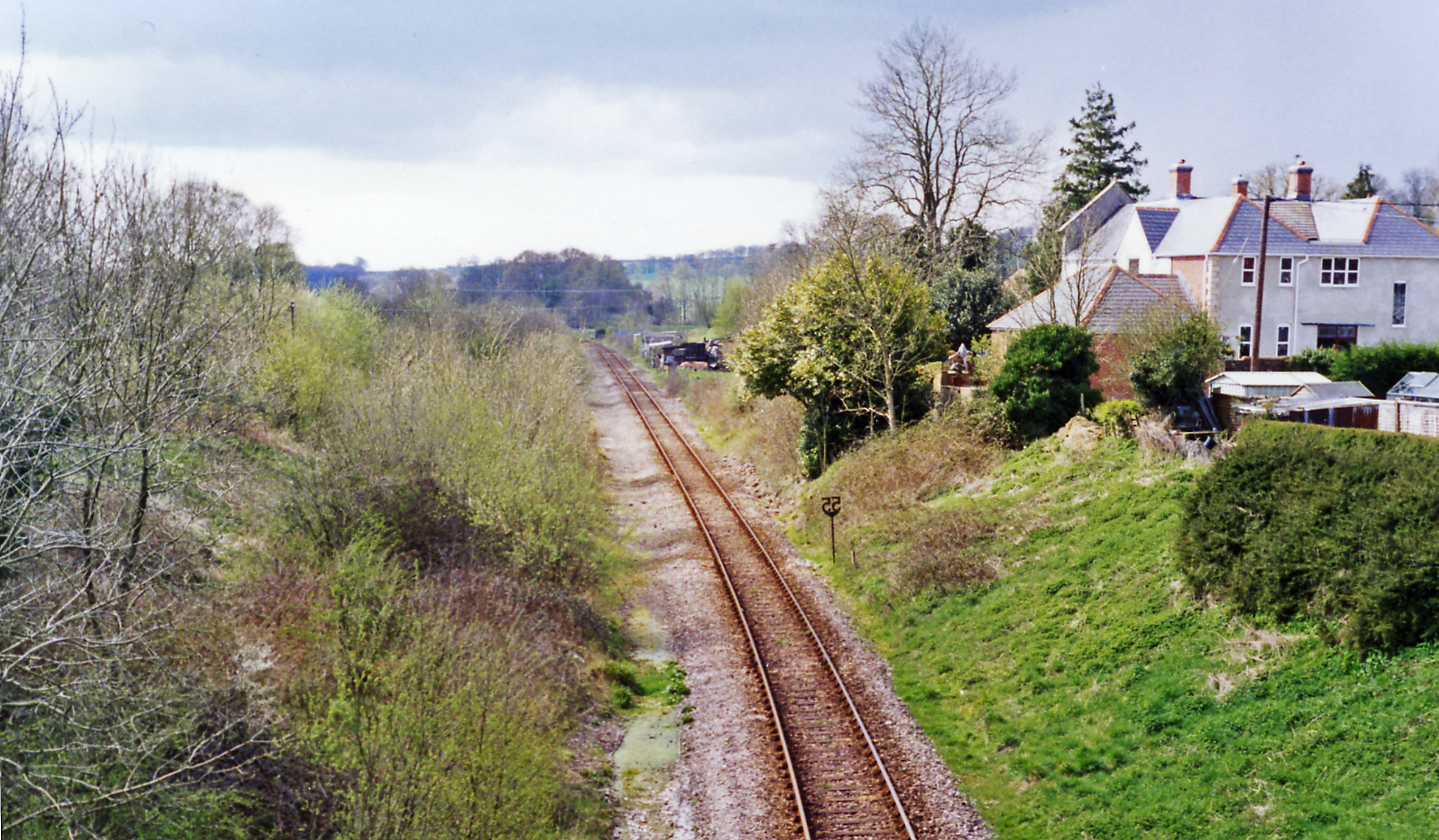
- Site of the station (1995)

General information
- Location: Holywell, Dorset; England
- Coordinates: 50.8353°N 2.5801°W
- Grid reference: ST591041
- Platforms: 2

Other information
- Status: Disused

History
- Original company: Wilts, Somerset and Weymouth Railway
- Pre-grouping: Great Western Railway
- Post-grouping: Great Western Railway; Western Region of British Railways

Key dates
- 20 January 1857: Station opens
- 3 October 1966: Station closes
Location

Evershot was a railway station in the county of Dorset in England. Served by trains on what is now known as the Heart of Wessex Line, it was two miles from the village it served, at Holywell, just south of Evershot Tunnel. The station consisted of two platforms, a small goods yard and signal box. It had a station building on the up platform.

== History ==
Opened on 20 January 1857 by the Wilts, Somerset and Weymouth Railway, it became part of the Great Western Railway. Remaining in that company in the grouping of 1923, it was placed in the Western Region when the railways were nationalised in 1948. The station closed when local trains were withdrawn during the Beeching closures, taking effect on 3 October 1966.

== Accident ==
An accident which resulted in the death of a railway staff member took place near this station in 1865.

== The site today ==
Some remains of the station can be seen in the wide area it occupied just south of the tunnel.

Preceding station	Historical railways	Following station
Chetnole Halt; Line and station open	Great Western Railway; Wilts, Somerset and Weymouth Railway	Cattistock Halt; Line open, station closed
