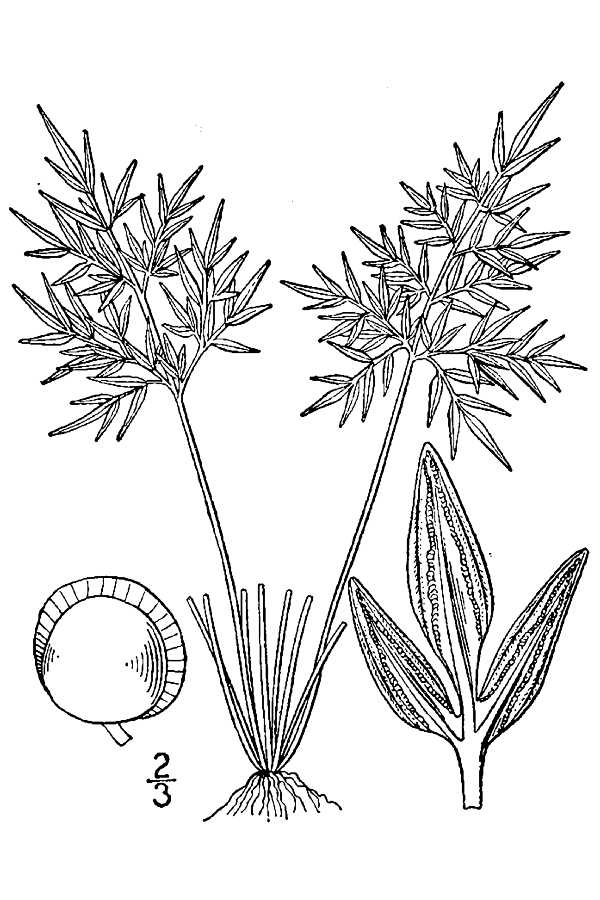
- Aspidotis densa

Scientific classification
- Kingdom: Plantae
- Clade: Tracheophytes
- Division: Polypodiophyta
- Class: Polypodiopsida
- Order: Polypodiales
- Family: Pteridaceae
- Subfamily: Cheilanthoideae
- Genus: Aspidotis (Nutt. ex Hook.) Copel.

Species
- See text.

= Aspidotis =

Genus of ferns

Aspidotis is a small genus of leptosporangiate ferns known commonly as laceferns. Most species are native to slopes, ridges, and rocky outcroppings, primarily in California and Mexico, although one species included in the genus by some authorities is widely distributed in eastern Africa.

== Description ==
Members of Aspidotis are small ferns, with shiny, tufted fronds generally less than 35 centimeters long. Fertile leaves have false indusia formed by the leaves' inrolled margins, which partially conceal the spore-bearing sori.

== Taxonomy ==
The taxonomy of laceferns has been considerably refined since they were first described in the late 1800s. Species currently placed in Aspidotis were originally assigned to a section of Hypolepis, then to Cheilanthes. David Lellinger established Aspidotis as a distinct genus based on characteristic features of its false indusia and its leaves, including their shiny surface, although as late as the 1990 publication of the Kubitzki system, these ferns were sometimes still included in Cheilanthes.

=== Species ===
As of July 2026, the Checklist of Ferns and Lycophytes of the World recognized four species, including one identified as a fertile interspecific hybrid.

- Aspidotis californica (Nutt. ex Hook.) Nutt. ex Copel. – California lacefern
- Aspidotis carlotta-halliae (Wagner & E. F. Gilbert) Lellinger – Carlotta Hall's lacefern or tufted lacefern, a fertile hybrid of A. californica and A. densa, endemic to California
- Aspidotis densa (Brack.) Lellinger – cliffbrake or Indian's dream
- Aspidotis meifolia (D.C.Eaton) Pic.Serm. – endemic to Mexico

Other species of plants commonly known as laceferns are not part of Aspidotis and are often not closely related. Microlepia strigosa is from a different order of ferns, and Asparagus setaceus is not a fern at all.

== Ecology ==
Ferns in this genus grow in a variety of conditions, from low woodland slopes, to chaparral, to higher-elevation ridges, to marginal habitats like rocky crevices and the bases of boulders.

Some laceferns show an affinity for serpentine soil. In particular, disjunct populations of A. densa in eastern North America are edaphic endemics. A. carlotta-halliae and the West Coast populations of A. densa are commonly associated with these ultramafic soils but are not restricted to them.

== Etymology ==
Not all authorities agree on the exact etymology of Aspidotis. In all cases, the name is derived from Greek, and refers to the distinctive shield-like false indusium found especially in A. californica. Some authors suggest ασπιδοτες (shield-bearer) as the intended origin, while others claim ασπιδος-ωτος (shield-eared).
