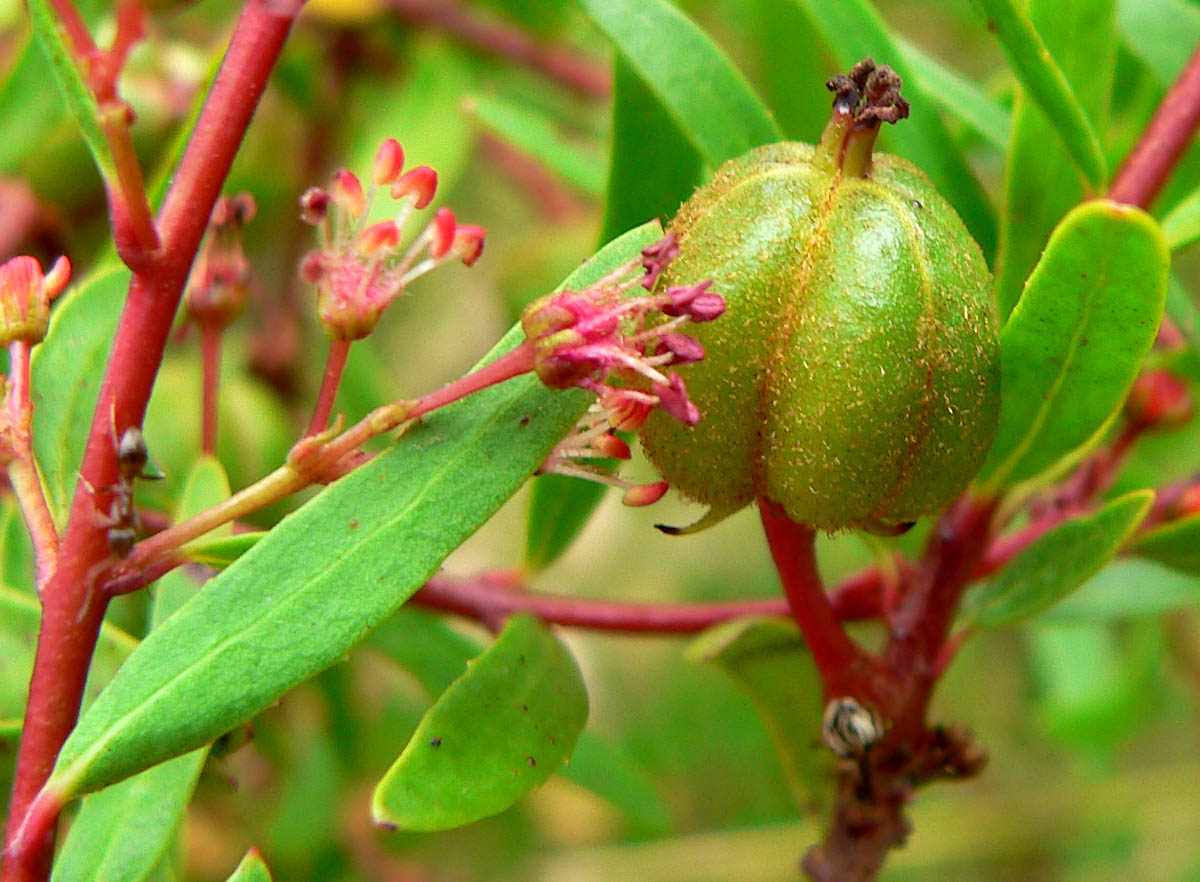

Scientific classification
- Kingdom: Plantae
- Clade: Tracheophytes
- Clade: Angiosperms
- Clade: Eudicots
- Clade: Rosids
- Order: Malpighiales
- Family: Picrodendraceae
- Genus: Tetracoccus
- Species: T. dioicus

Binomial name
- Tetracoccus dioicus Parry

= Tetracoccus dioicus =

Species of flowering plant

Tetracoccus dioicus, known by the common names red shrubby-spurge and Parry's tetracoccus, is a species of flowering plant.

== Distribution ==
The shrub native to the states of southwestern California and Baja California (México). In Southern California, populations are within Orange County, Riverside County, and San Diego County.

It grows in coastal sage scrub and chaparral habitats below 1,000 metres (3,300 ft), in the South Coast region and Peninsular Ranges.

== Description ==
Tetracoccus dioicus is an erect shrub reaching about 2 metres (6.6 ft). It has gray-barked branches that are bright red when young.

The stiff, leathery, yellowish-green leaves are opposite or clustered, often in threes, and they may be rolled lengthwise.

The shrub bears staminate and pistillate flowers with red-yellow structures. The bloom period is April and May.

It produces distinctive four-lobed fruits which ripen to a bright red color.

== See also ==
- California coastal sage and chaparral ecoregion
- California montane chaparral and woodlands ecoregion
- Flora of the California chaparral and woodlands
