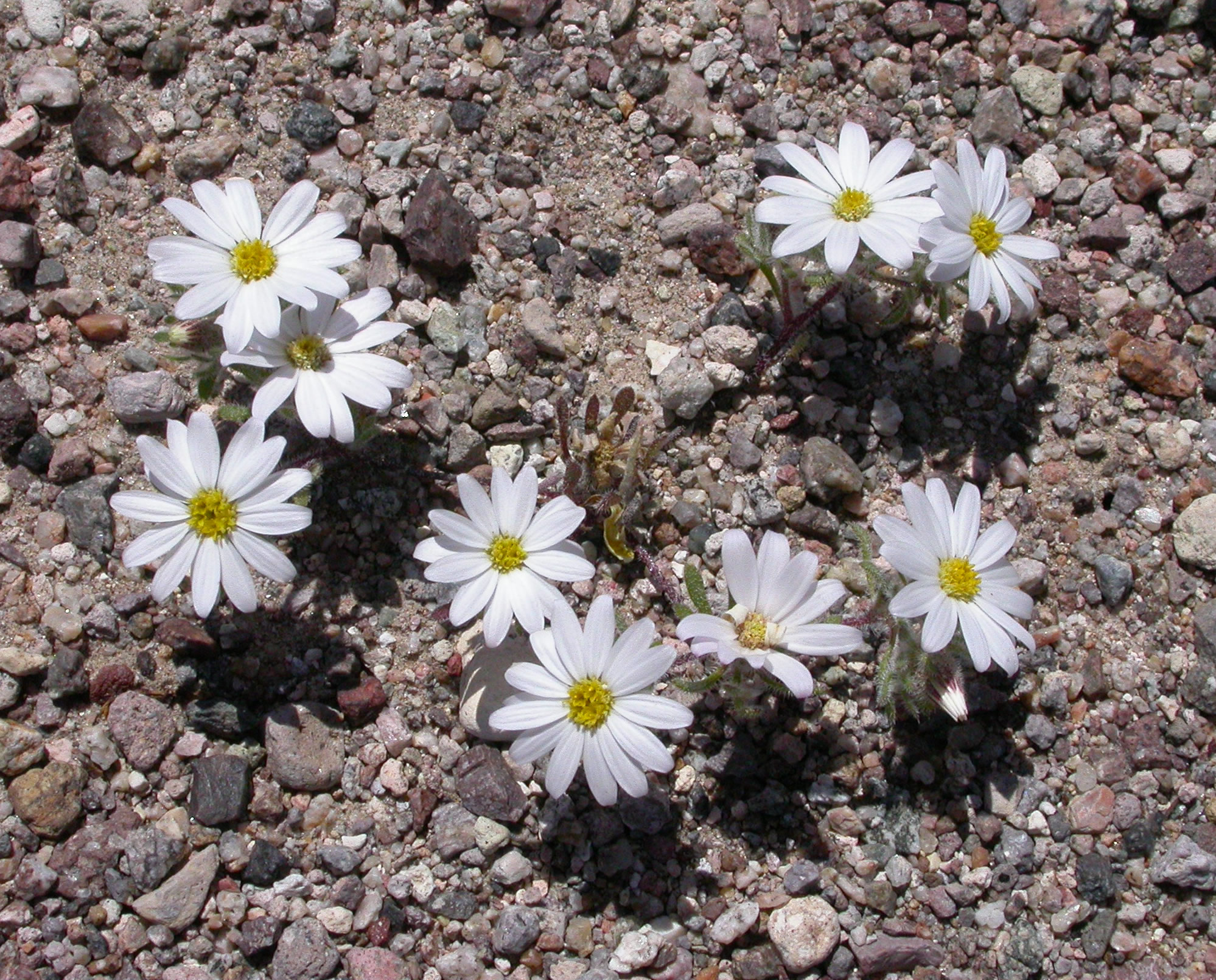
- Monoptilon bellioides

Scientific classification
- Kingdom: Plantae
- Clade: Tracheophytes
- Clade: Angiosperms
- Clade: Eudicots
- Clade: Asterids
- Order: Asterales
- Family: Asteraceae
- Subfamily: Asteroideae
- Tribe: Astereae
- Subtribe: Chaetopappinae
- Genus: Monoptilon; Torrey & A.Gray

Synonyms
- Eremiastrum A.Gray

= Monoptilon =

Desertstar

Genus of flowering plants

Monoptilon (desertstar) is a small genus of annual plants in the tribe Astereae within the family Asteraceae.

They are native to North America.

Species

- Monoptilon bellidiforme Torr. & A.Gray ex A.Gray (daisy desertstar) - CA NV AZ UT
- Monoptilon bellioides (A.Gray) H.M. Hall (Mojave desertstar) - - CA NV AZ Baja California, Sonora
