= Carlotta Case Hall =

American botanist (1880–1949)

Carlotta Case Hall (January 19, 1880 – 1949) was an American botanist and university professor who collected and published on ferns. She also co-authored a handbook on the plants of Yosemite National Park.

== Biography ==
Carlotta Hall was born in Kingsville, Ohio, in 1880 to Adelaide Percy (Hardy) Case and Quincy A. Case. She studied botany at the University of California, Berkeley, graduating with a B.S. in 1904. In 1910 she married the botanist Harvey Monroe Hall, with whom she had a daughter, Martha, in 1916.

Hall became a fern collector and an assistant professor of botany at the University of California, Berkeley. She published on ferns of the Pacific Coast and co-wrote the illustrated handbook A Yosemite Flora (1912) with her husband as a pocket-sized botanical guidebook to Yosemite National Park. The book covers more than 900 species, omitting only the grasses, sedges, and rushes.

She was a member of the California Academy of Sciences and a corresponding member of several European scientific societies.

A species of California fern, the tufted lacefern or Carlotta Hall's lace fern (Aspidotis carlotta-halliae), is named in her honor.

Her papers, along with those of her husband and daughter, are held by UC Berkeley.

== Selected publications ==
As author;

- "Notholaena copelandii, a Newly Recognized Species of the Mexican Texano Region". J. Am Fern 40 (2), 1950, 178–187.
- "A Pellaea of Baja California". J. Am. Fern 37 (4), 1947, 111–114.
- "Observations on Western Botrychiums". J. Am Fern 33 (4), 1943, 119–130.

As editor;

- The Pacific Coast Species of Polypodium. University of California, 1918.

As co-author with Harvey Monroe Hall;

- A Yosemite Flora: A Descriptive Account of the Ferns and Flowering Plants, Including the Trees, of the Yosemite National Park. Paul Elder & Company, 1912.
