= Beck Row =

Village in Suffolk, England

Coordinates: 52.36°N 00.48°E

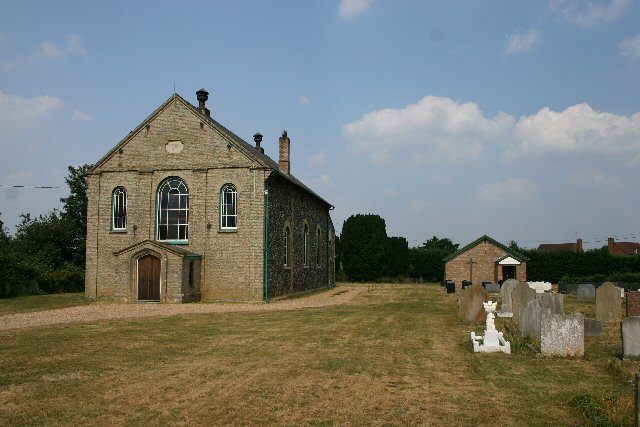

- Location within Suffolk
- OS grid reference: TL6977
- Civil parish: Beck Row, Holywell Row and Kenny Hill
- District: West Suffolk
- Shire county: Suffolk
- Region: East
- Country: England
- Sovereign state: United Kingdom
- Post town: Bury St Edmunds
- Postcode district: IP28
- Dialling code: 01638
- Police: Suffolk
- Fire: Suffolk
- Ambulance: East of England
- UK Parliament: West Suffolk

Beck Row is a village in the civil parish of Beck Row, Holywell Row and Kenny Hill, in the West Suffolk district, in the county of Suffolk, England. The village is close to RAF Mildenhall and is home to about 3,000 people. The village has a church, and a beacon dating from the time of the Battle of Trafalgar. A Victoria Cross recipient, Ron Middleton, is buried in the local cemetery, with a small cul-de-sac named in his honour.
