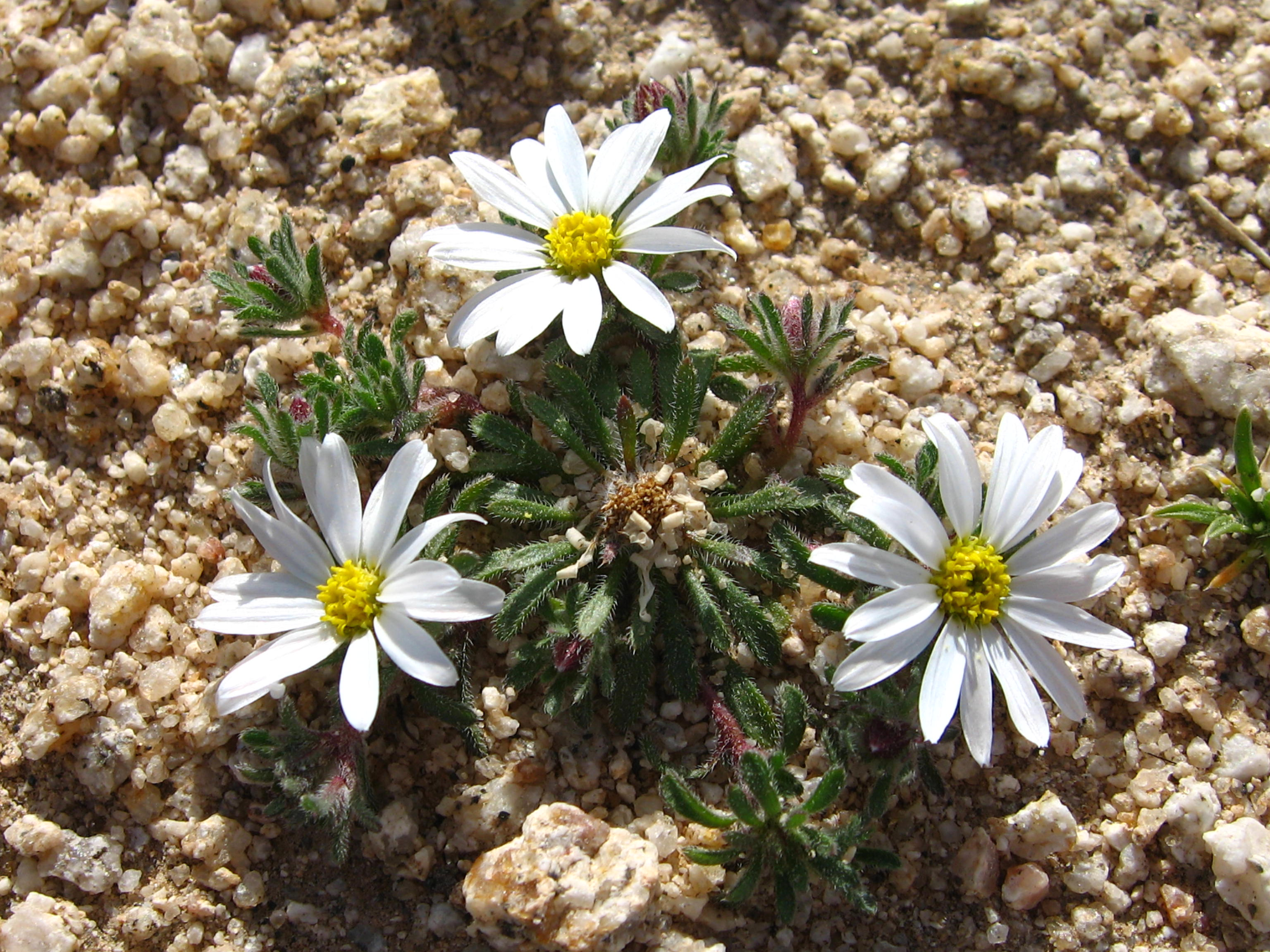

Scientific classification
- Kingdom: Plantae
- Clade: Tracheophytes
- Clade: Angiosperms
- Clade: Eudicots
- Clade: Asterids
- Order: Asterales
- Family: Asteraceae
- Genus: Monoptilon
- Species: M. bellidiforme

Binomial name
- Monoptilon bellidiforme Torr. & A.Gray ex A.Gray

= Monoptilon bellidiforme =

Species of flowering plant

Monoptilon bellidiforme is a species of flowering plant in the family Asteraceae known by the common names daisy desertstar and small desert star. It is native to the desert southwest of the United States, where it grows in typical desert habitat such as sandy flats and washes. It is similar to the other Monoptilon, M. bellioides, but it is usually smaller. Its stem is just a few centimeters long, sometimes small enough so that the inflorescence sits at ground level. The leaves are no more than a centimeter long. The flower head has many ray florets which are usually white, sometimes purple-tinged. They are 5 to 7 millimeters long. The fruit is an achene about half a centimeter long including the pappus, which is an elongated bristle surrounded by fused scales.
