= Tetracoccus ilicifolius =

Conservation status
- Imperiled (NatureServe)

Scientific classification
- Kingdom: Plantae
- Clade: Tracheophytes
- Clade: Angiosperms
- Clade: Eudicots
- Clade: Rosids
- Order: Malpighiales
- Family: Picrodendraceae
- Genus: Tetracoccus
- Species: T. ilicifolius

Binomial name
- Tetracoccus ilicifolius Coville & Gilman

Species of shrub

Tetracoccus ilicifolius is a rare species of flowering shrub in the family Picrodendraceae known by the common names hollybush and holly-leaved tetracoccus.

It was described by botanists Frederick Vernon Coville and Marshall French Gilman in 1936. They had participated with other eminent biologists in the 1891 Death Valley Expedition funded by Congress.

== Distribution ==
The plant is endemic to California, found in only several Mojave Desert mountain ranges within Death Valley National Park, in eastern Inyo County.

It grows on dry, rocky slopes at 600–1,700 metres (2,000–5,600 ft) in elevation, in the Panamint Range, Grapevine Mountains, and Cottonwood Mountains surrounding Death Valley.

There are fewer than ten occurrences, and it is a NatureServe listed Critically endangered species.

== Description ==
Tetracoccus ilicifolius is a branching shrub, hairless in texture except for the new twigs, which have woolly brownish hairs. The shiny, leathery leaves are oppositely arranged or borne in whorls along the branches. Each leaf is oval with a toothed margin and measures 1.5 to 3 centimeters long.

The plant is dioecious, with male and female individuals producing different types of flowers. The staminate flowers occur in dense clusters, each flower with 7 to 9 lance-shaped sepals and 7 to 9 stamens. The pistillate flower occurs singly. The bloom period is May and June.

It produces a rounded, woolly brown fruit with usually four chambers. The fruit is around a centimeter long when mature and contains one or two seeds per chamber.

== See also ==
- Endemic flora of California
- Flora of the California desert regions
- Natural history of the Mojave Desert
