= Harvey Monroe Hall =

American botanist (1874-1932)

- Born: March 29, 1874; Lee County, Illinois
- Died: March 11, 1932 (aged 57); Washington, DC
- Education: University of California
- Scientific career
- Fields: botanist
- Workplaces: University of California Stanford University
- Author abbrev. (botany): H.M.Hall

Harvey Monroe Hall (March 29, 1874 – March 11, 1932) was an American botanist particularly noted for his taxonomic work in the western United States.

Hall was born in Lee County, Illinois, on March 29, 1874, and raised near Riverside, California. He studied botany at the University of California, earning a B.S. in 1901, M.S. in 1902, and Ph.D. in 1906. In 1910, he married fellow University of California graduate Carlotta Case. Their daughter Martha was born in 1916. He died while in Washington, DC for a conference on March 11, 1932.

== Career and research ==
=== University of California ===
Studying plant taxonomy under W. L. Jepson at the University of California, Hall completed his doctoral dissertation, The Compositae of Southern California, in 1906. He went on to be a professor of botany at the university and botanist for the agricultural experiment station. His early work focused on taxonomic studies of plants in California, and he added over 200,000 specimens to the herbarium. He resigned from his professorship in 1919, but continued to maintain an office and relationships in Berkeley.

=== Carnegie Institution ===
While professionally established, Hall went to work for ecologist Frederic Clements at the Carnegie Institution Division of Plant Sciences at Stanford University in 1919 in an effort to explore experimental methods of taxonomy. The pair established methods for conducting reciprocal transplant experiments, whereas plants were moved and studied in the habitats of similar taxonomic species. These experiments provided methods for studying plant adaptation, but did not readily explain mechanisms of plant evolution. In 1924, Hall began to work with geneticist, and friend, E. B. Babcock to look beyond ecological methods to genetics and cytology as experimental methods to explore taxonomic and phylogenetic relationships. Hall left Clements group and started to assemble his own experimental team, hiring David Keck and William Hiesey in 1926 and Jens Clausen in 1931.

In 1928, Carnegie president John Merriam sent Hall to Europe for a year to study national parks. His report suggested the creation of natural reserves with national parks for the purpose of scientific study.

== Eponyms ==
- Hall Natural Area, Sierra Nevada research area
- Tetracoccus hallii, Hall's shrubby-spurge

== Selected works ==
- 1902 A botanical survey of San Jacinto mountain (M.S. Thesis)
- 1907 Compositae of southern California (Ph.D. Thesis)
- 1910 Studies in ornamental trees and shrubs
- 1912 A Yosemite flora (with Carlotta Case Hall)
- 1915 Flora of the Pacific Coast
- 1918 Rubber-content of North American plants (with Thomas Harper Goodspeed)
- 1919 Life-zone indicators in California (with Joseph Grinnell)
- 1921 A rubber plant survey of western North America (with Frances L. Long)
- 1923 The North American species of Artemisia, Chrysothamnus, and Atriplex (with Frederic E. Clements)
- 1928 The genus Haplopappus; a phylogenetic study in the Compositae

== Associated collections ==
- Harvey Monroe Hall Papers, 1859-1991, bulk 1896-1932 Bancroft Library, University of California, Berkeley
