= Holywell Street =

Holywell Street may refer to:

- Holywell Street, London
- Holywell Street, Oxford
