= Sole Common Pond =

Nature reserve in Berkshire, England

Coordinates: 51.4334°N 1.4094°W

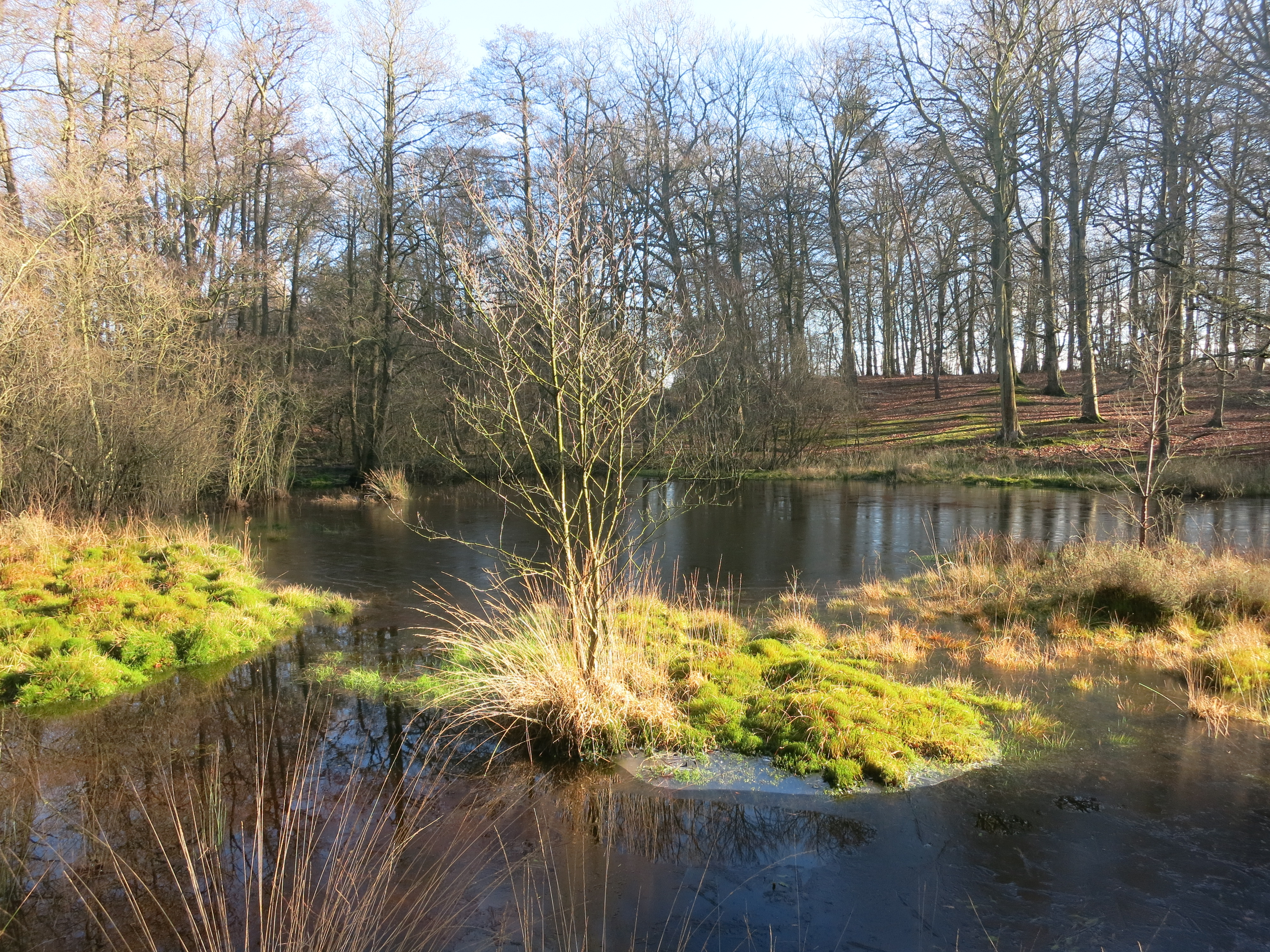
- Interactive map of Sole Common Pond
- Type: Nature reserve
- Location: , Berkshire
- OS grid: SU411706
- Area: 3 hectares (7.4 acres)
- Manager: Berkshire, Buckinghamshire and Oxfordshire Wildlife Trust

Sole Common Pond is a 3-hectare (7.4-acre) nature reserve south-west of Boxford in Berkshire in Berkshire. It is managed by the Berkshire, Buckinghamshire and Oxfordshire Wildlife Trust.

It consists of a Sphagnum fringed pond, heath, wet woodland and a wildflower meadow.

== Fauna ==
The site has the following fauna:

=== Invertebrates ===
- Sympetrum danae
- Conocephalus fuscus
- Metrioptera roeselii
- Southern hawker
- Common darter
- Lestes sponsa
- Four-spotted chaser
- Large red damselfly
- Keeled skimmer

=== Birds ===
- Eurasian woodcock
- Wood warbler

== Flora ==
The site has the following flora:

=== Trees ===
- Birch

=== Plants ===
- Menyanthes trifoliata
- Polypodium vulgare
- Erica tetralix
- Calluna vulgaris
- Drosera rotundifolia
- Hypericum perforatum
- Sphagnum magellanicum
- Sphagnum capillifolium
- Sphagnum inundatum

=== Fungi ===
- Cantharellus cibarius
- Caloboletus calopus
- Russula nobilis
