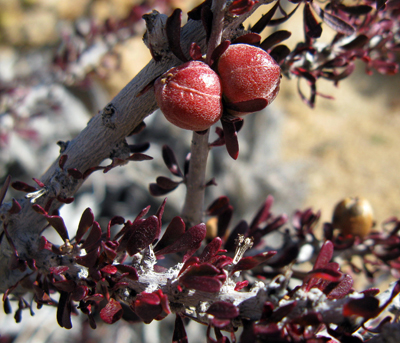

Scientific classification
- Kingdom: Plantae
- Clade: Tracheophytes
- Clade: Angiosperms
- Clade: Eudicots
- Clade: Rosids
- Order: Malpighiales
- Family: Picrodendraceae
- Genus: Tetracoccus
- Species: T. hallii

Binomial name
- Tetracoccus hallii Brandegee

= Tetracoccus hallii =

Species of shrub

Tetracoccus hallii is a species of flowering shrub in the family Picrodendraceae, known by the common names Hall's shrubby-spurge and Hall's tetracoccus.

== Distribution ==
The plant is native to the Mojave Desert and Sonoran Desert: in southeastern California, southern Nevada, and western Arizona in the U.S.; and Baja California state in Mexico.

It grows in many types of desert habitat, including creosote bush scrub, at elevations below 1,200 metres (3,900 ft).

It is abundant and widespread in Joshua Tree National Park in Southern California.

== Description ==
Tetracoccus hallii is a bushy, branching shrub, hairless in texture except for the new twigs, which have rough hairs. The small leaves occur in clusters along the branches, each leathery, teardrop-shaped leaf measuring just a few millimeters long.

The plant is dioecious, with male and female individuals producing different types of flowers. The staminate flowers occur in clusters, each flower with 4 to 6 rounded sepals and 4 to 8 erect stamens. The pistillate flower occurs singly. Its bloom period is January through May, from the lower Sonoran to the higher Mojave deserts.

It produces a rounded, woolly fruit with usually three chambers. The fruit is around a centimeter long when mature and contains one or two seeds per chamber.

== See also ==
- Flora of the Sonoran Deserts
- Natural history of the Mojave Desert
