= Holme Marsh =

Village in Herefordshire, England

Coordinates: 52.187°N 2.966°W

Holme Marsh (Originally Holmes) is a village in Herefordshire, England on the A480 road. It is near the Welsh border and the small town of Kington. A 'Holme' is an island in a marsh Anglo-Saxon. There were once at least two ponds.
