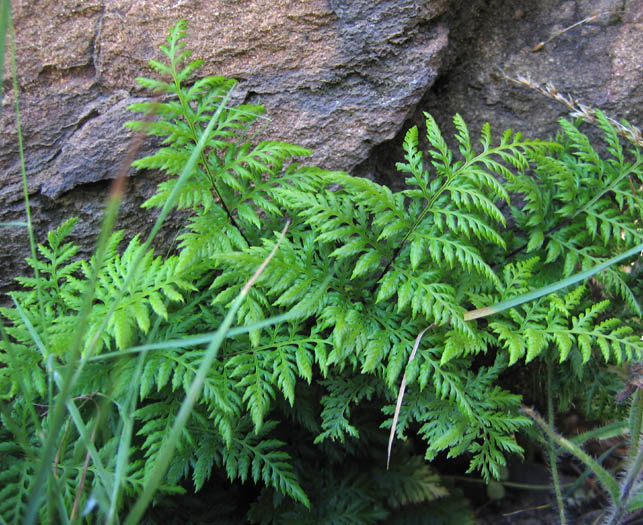

Conservation status
- Secure (NatureServe)

Scientific classification
- Kingdom: Plantae
- Clade: Tracheophytes
- Division: Polypodiophyta
- Class: Polypodiopsida
- Order: Polypodiales
- Family: Pteridaceae
- Genus: Aspidotis
- Species: A. californica

Binomial name
- Aspidotis californica (Hook.) Nutt. ex Copel.

Synonyms
- Adiantopsis californica Cheilanthes californica Hypolepis californica

= Aspidotis californica =

Species of fern

Aspidotis californica is a species of fern known by the common name California lacefern. It is native to California and Baja California.

It grows in rock cracks and crevices in many types of habitat, including Chaparral, Yellow pine forest, Foothill oak woodland, and Valley grassland.

== Description ==
Aspidotis californica has leaves that are thin and dissected into many triangular leaflets which are subdivided into small segments with curled teeth.

The leaf segments bear sori containing sporangia, with the edges of the leaves rolled under to create a false indusium over the sori.
