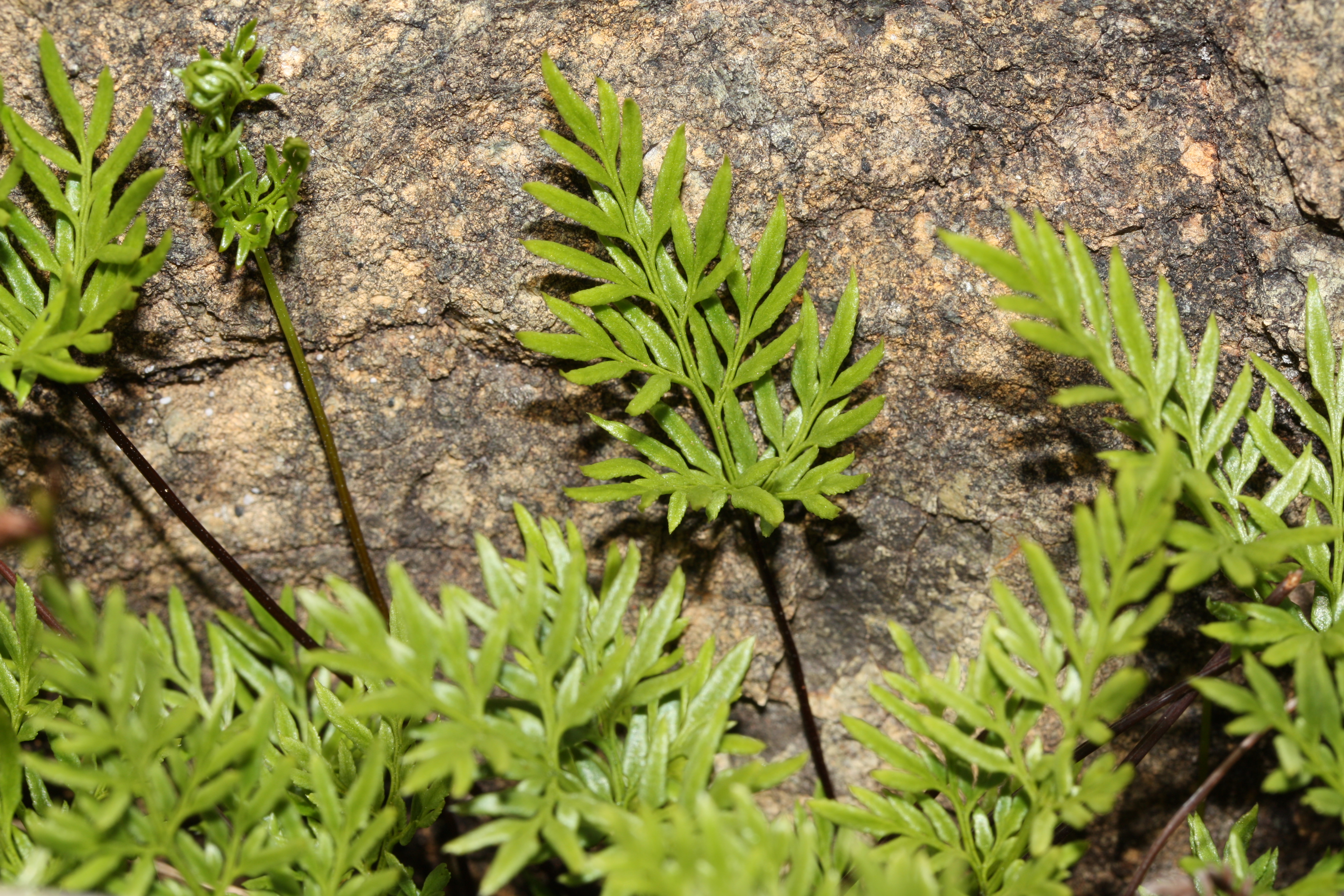

Conservation status
- Secure (NatureServe)

Scientific classification
- Kingdom: Plantae
- Clade: Tracheophytes
- Division: Polypodiophyta
- Class: Polypodiopsida
- Order: Polypodiales
- Family: Pteridaceae
- Subfamily: Cheilanthoideae
- Genus: Aspidotis
- Species: A. densa

Binomial name
- Aspidotis densa (Brack.) Lellinger, 1968

Synonyms
- Cheilanthes siliquosa Cryptogramma densa Onychium densum Pellaea densa

= Aspidotis densa =

Species of fern

Aspidotis densa is a species of fern in the Cheilanthoid subfamily, known by the common name Indian's dream or Serpentine fern or dense lace fern. It is native to the west coast of North America from British Columbia to California and east to the Rocky Mountains in Idaho, Montana, and Wyoming; there is a disjunct population on serpentine soils in Quebec.

== Description ==
This fern has leaves on long wiry brown to black petioles (stem below the leaf), with the leaf blade occupying less than half of the total length of the leaf when including the petiole. The leaves emerge from a short creeping rhizome covered with firm narrow scales. Where the petiole joins the leaf, the stem color grades to green and acquires a groove on its adaxial (top) surface. The leaf blades are medium to dark green, sometimes with a glaucous or bluish cast. The leaf blade is triangular and composed of many pinnae which are subdivided into narrow leaflets (pinnules). The undersides of leaflets on fertile fronds are covered with sori over which the edges of the leaflet are folded to form a false indusium. Plants often have only fertile fronds, but they sometimes exhibit frond dimorphism, with sterile fronds shorter and with broader and flatter leaflets than the fertile fronds, which rise above on long petioles. The fertile frond leaflets are folded under at the edges and appear narrow and lace-like. The flat leaflets on sterile fronds have a toothed edge, but on fertile fronds these teeth are often reduced and are not easily visible since the edges fold under to form the false indusium. Under some growth conditions only sterile fronds form. Like many ferns, new fronds are produced in spring by circinate vernation.

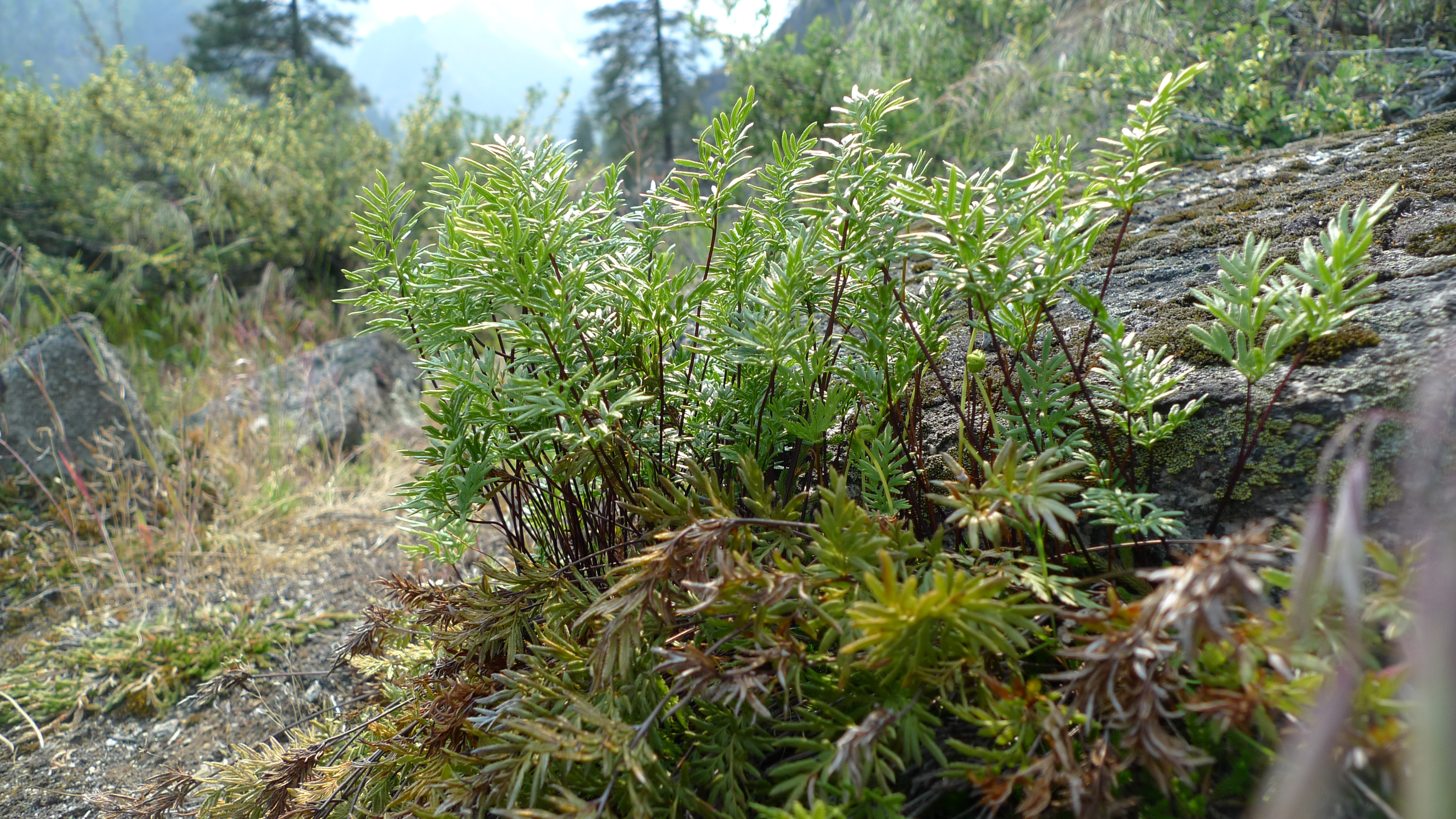
Aspidotis densa at Icicle Creek Canyon, Wenatchee Mountains Washington

== Habitat ==
A. densa grows in rocky areas, usually on serpentine soils on rocky mountain slopes, well-drained but seasonally moist. It is usually found in growing full sun, but it can tolerate some shade. It can grow in rock crevices and exposed rocky outcrops in mossy cracks, and over time may creep to fill in fissures, creating well-established colonies in the outcrop. Though it grows mostly on serpentine, A. densa is also found on other rocks and soil types. There are numerous occurrences of this species west of Victoria, British Columbia on mafic (basalt) hills where no ultramafic rock, including serpentine, is mapped.

== Range ==
A. densa is native largely to the west coast of North America from British Columbia to California and east to the Rocky Mountains in Idaho, Montana, and Wyoming. There is a disjunct population on serpentine soil in Frontenac National Park in Quebec, and closer probably disjunct populations in the Wasatch Mountains of Utah and in the Cuyamaca Mountains near San Diego California, neither apparently associated with serpentine. It typically grows in mountains from low elevations to about 3,000 meters. It also grows near sea level near coasts in a few locations associated with serpentine, notably in Marin County California and in Washington Park and Cypress Island near Anacortes Washington.

== As ecologic indicator ==
Aspidotis densa is a regional ecologic indicator on areas where ultramafic rocks (serpentine) are patchy, such as the Klamath and Siskayou Mountains of northern California and southwest Oregon and the Wenatchee Mountains of Washington. Areas of serpentine soil can typically be seen as areas with sparse plant coverage or open forest bounded by closed forest on the non-ultramafic soils, with Aspidotis densa concentrated in the serpentine areas.

== Phylogeny ==
Relationships between vascular plants with an emphasis on the ferns as summarized from morphological and molecular phylogenetic analyses. Kenrick and Crane (1997) summarizes the results of previously published studies. For a complete fern family phylogeny see Smith et al. (2006).

== Gallery ==
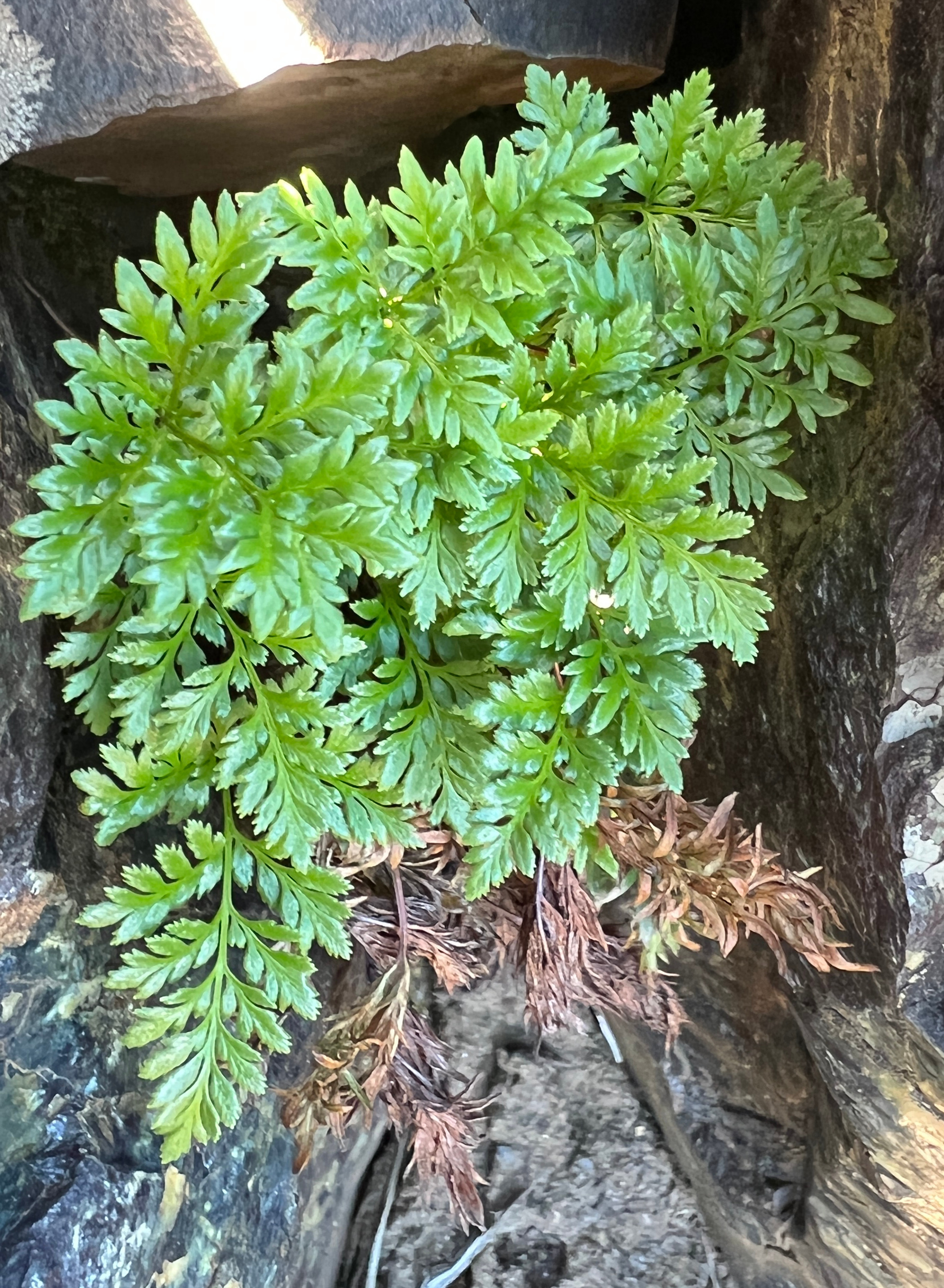
Sterile fronds

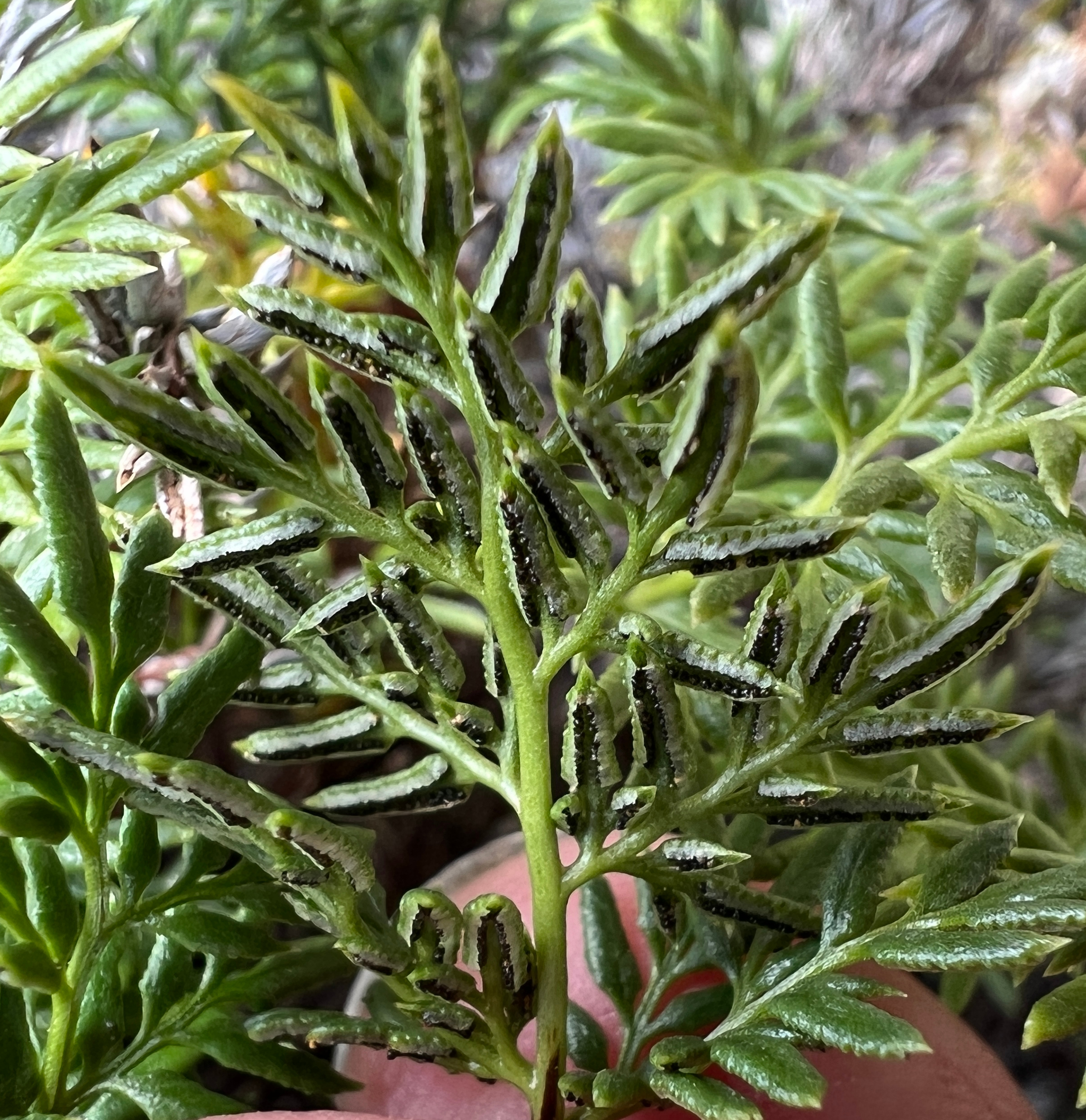
Sori with false indusium

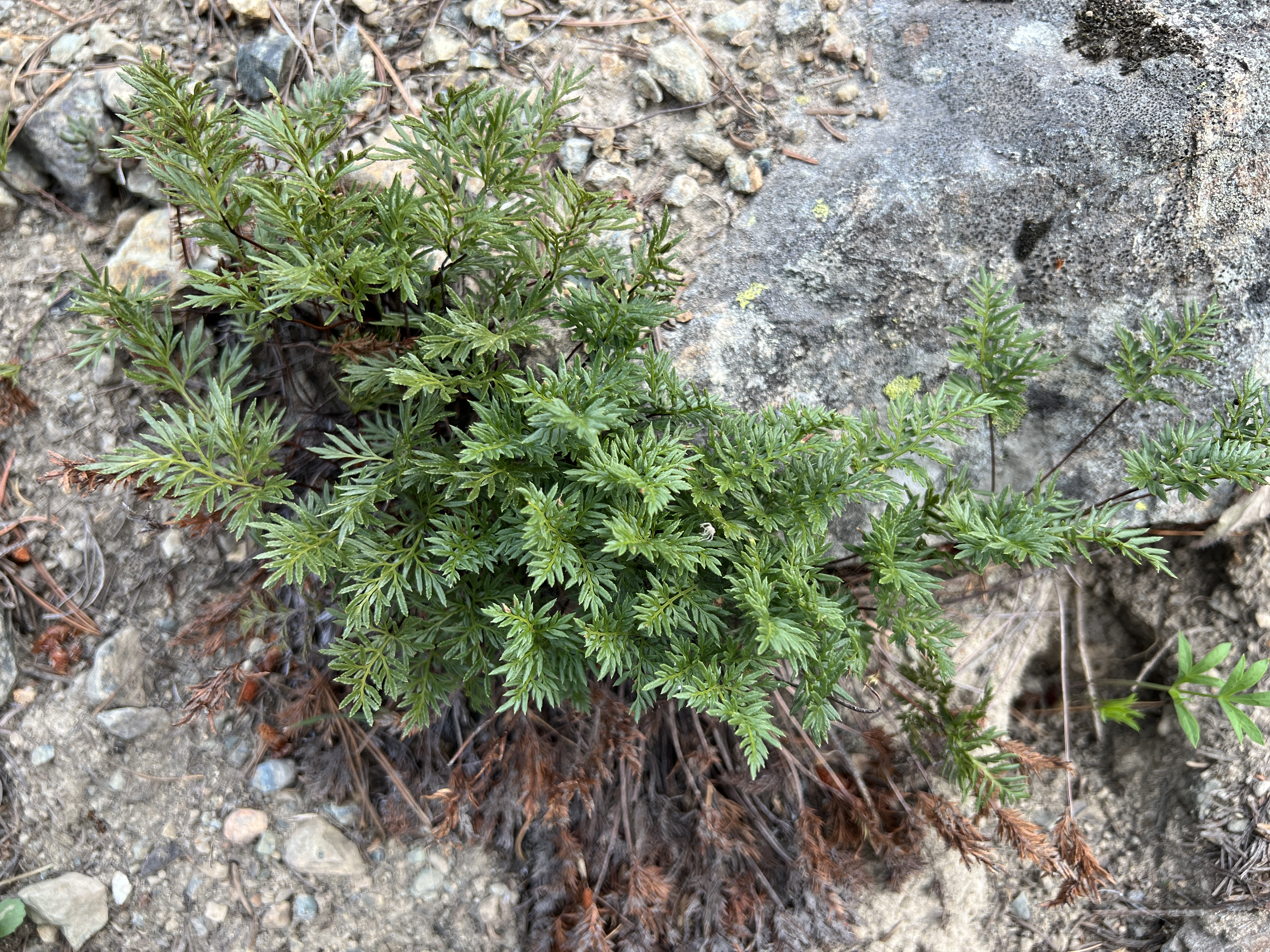
Iron Peak Wenatchee Mountains

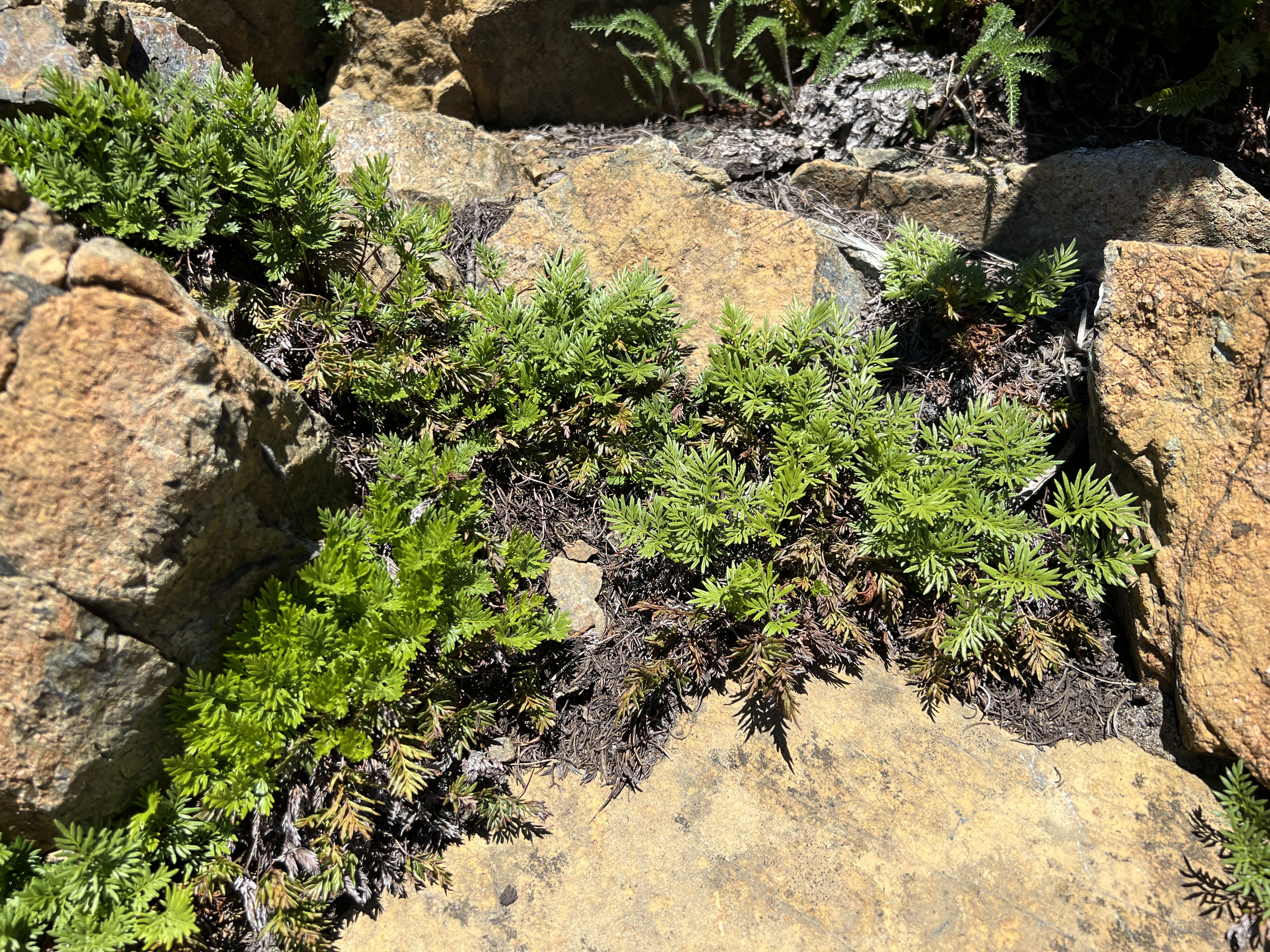
Near Ingall's Pass Wenatchee Mountains

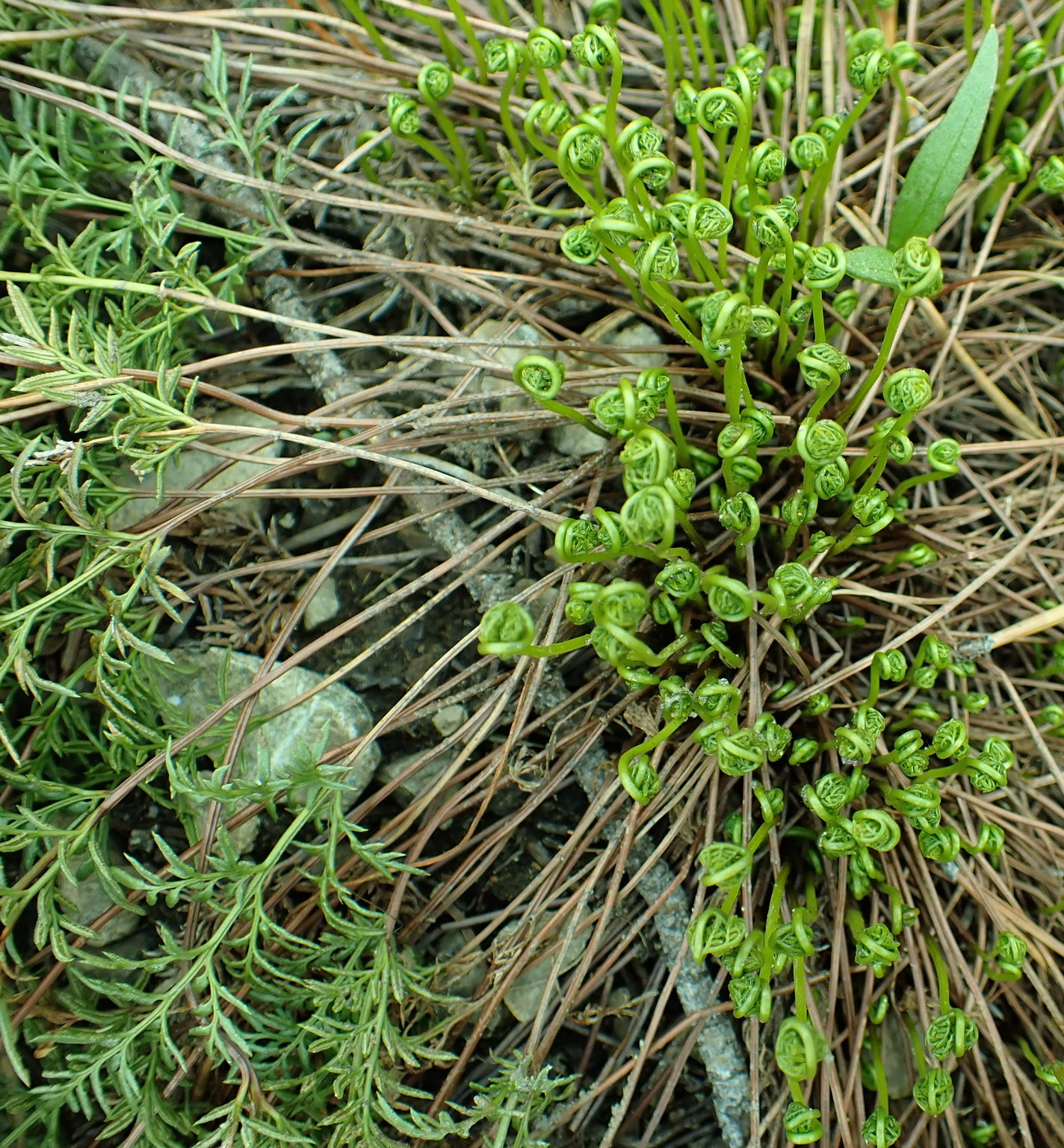
Fiddleheads emerging in spring
