= Holehouse =

Hamlet in Derbyshire, England

Coordinates: 53.428°N 1.994°W

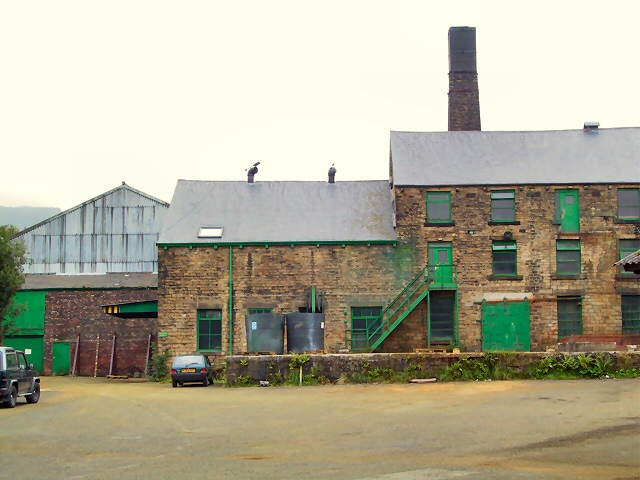
- Hole House Works.

- Location within Derbyshire
- OS grid reference: SK004923
- District: High Peak
- Shire county: Derbyshire
- Region: East Midlands
- Country: England
- Sovereign state: United Kingdom
- Post town: GLOSSOP
- Postcode district: SK13
- Police: Derbyshire
- Fire: Derbyshire
- Ambulance: North West

Holehouse is a hamlet in Derbyshire, England. It is located 2 miles west of Glossop, on the A626 road close to Charlesworth.
