= Holywell Row =

Village in Suffolk, England

Coordinates: 52.36°N 00.48°E

- Location within Suffolk
- Area: 0.212 km^{2} (0.082 sq mi)
- Population: 570 (2018 estimate)
  - Density: 2,689/km^{2} (6,960/sq mi)
- OS grid reference: TL6977
- Civil parish: Beck Row, Holywell Row and Kenny Hill
- District: West Suffolk
- Shire county: Suffolk
- Region: East
- Country: England
- Sovereign state: United Kingdom
- Post town: Bury St Edmunds
- Postcode district: IP28
- Police: Suffolk
- Fire: Suffolk
- Ambulance: East of England
- UK Parliament: West Suffolk

Holywell Row is a village in Suffolk, England. It is part of the civil parish of Beck Row, Holywell Row and Kenny Hill. In 2018 it had an estimated population of 570.

Holywell Row is the site of an early Anglo-Saxon cemetery, excavated by T.C. Lethbridge.
