= Hooe Common =

Village in East Sussex, England

Coordinates: 50.8703°N 0.4067°E

- Interactive map of Hooe Common
- Country: England
- County: East Sussex
- District: Wealden

Hooe Common is a village in the Wealden district of East Sussex.
