= Honey Hill, Kent =

Hamlet in Kent, England

Coordinates: 51.313°N 1.035°E

Honey Hill
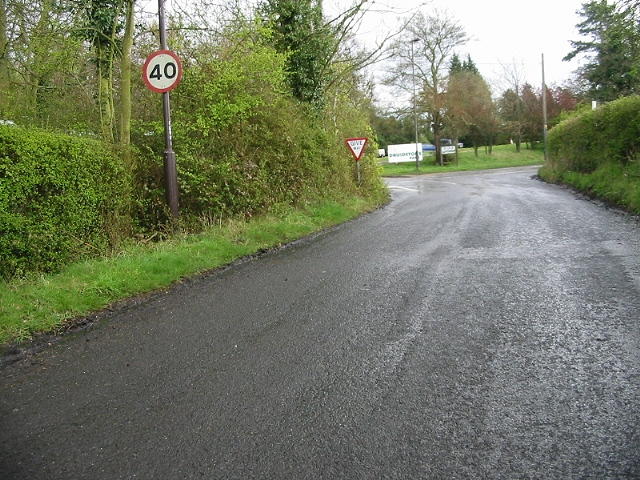
- Junction of Denstroude Lane with the A290

- Location within Kent
- Civil parish: Blean
- District: Canterbury
- Shire county: Kent
- Region: South East
- Country: England
- Sovereign state: United Kingdom
- Post town: Canterbury
- Postcode district: CT2
- Police: Kent
- Fire: Kent
- Ambulance: South East Coast
- UK Parliament: Canterbury

Honey Hill is a hamlet on the A290 road, in the civil parish of Blean, in the Canterbury district, in the county of Kent, England.
