= Hook, Wiltshire =

Village in Wiltshire, England

Coordinates: 51.559°N 1.889°W

Hook
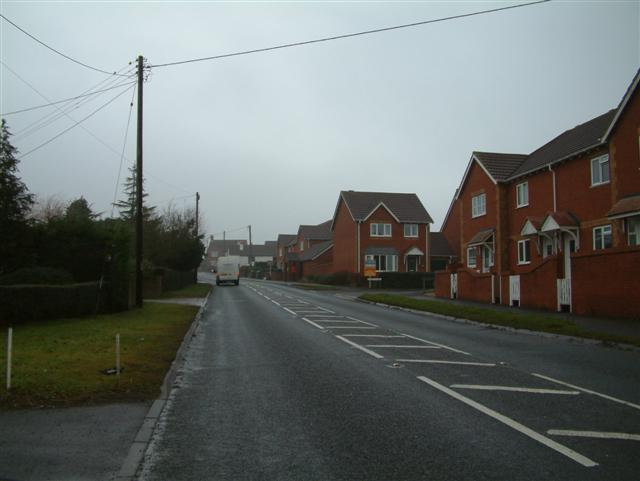
- Hook village

- Location within Wiltshire
- OS grid reference: SU078845
- Civil parish: Lydiard Tregoze
- Unitary authority: Wiltshire
- Ceremonial county: Wiltshire
- Region: South West
- Country: England
- Sovereign state: United Kingdom
- Post town: Swindon
- Postcode district: SN4
- Dialling code: 01793
- Police: Wiltshire
- Fire: Dorset and Wiltshire
- Ambulance: South Western
- UK Parliament: Chippenham

Hook is a small village in Wiltshire, England between the town of Royal Wootton Bassett and the village of Purton, just north of the M4 motorway. The village lies about 4 1/2 miles (7 km) west of the centre of Swindon, in the civil parish of Lydiard Tregoze.

The single-track road through the nearby hamlet of Hook Street is used as a 'rat run' by rush-hour commuters to and from the large town of Swindon.
