= Holywell, Dorset =

Hamlet in Dorset, England

Coordinates: 50°50′12″N 2°34′45″W

Holywell
- Hamlet
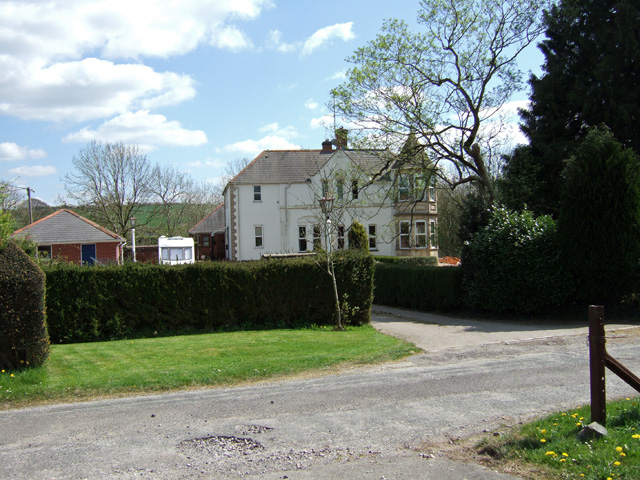
- Holywell House

- Location within Dorset
- Unitary authority: Dorset
- Ceremonial county: Dorset
- Region: South West
- Country: England
- Sovereign state: United Kingdom
- Postcode district: DT2
- Dialling code: 01935
- Police: Dorset
- Fire: Dorset and Wiltshire
- Ambulance: South Western
- UK Parliament: West Dorset

Holywell is a hamlet in Dorset, England, located on the A37 roughly midway between Yeovil and Dorchester. A tributary of the River Frome passes through the hamlet.

A number of Bronze Age objects have been discovered locally and are now in the British Museum.

From 1857 to 1966 Holywell was served by Evershot Station on the Heart of Wessex Line, which was named after the nearby village to the west.
