= List of Rubiaceae genera =

Full list of the genera in the family Rubiaceae. If the generic name is for an accepted genus, it will appear in bold italics followed by the author(s). If the name is a synonym, it will appear in italics followed by an equals sign (=) and the accepted name to which it is referred.

== A ==
- Abbottia F.Muell. = Timonius Rumph. ex DC.
- Abramsia Gillespie = Airosperma K.Schum. & Lauterb.
- **Achilleanthus** J.G.Chavez
- Acmostima Raf. = Pavetta L.
- **Acranthera** Arn. ex Meisn.
- **Acrobotrys** K.Schum. & K.Krause
- Acrodryon Spreng. = Cephalanthus L.
- Acrostoma Didr. = Remijia DC.
- **Acrosynanthus** Urb.
- **Acunaeanthus** Borhidi, Jarai-Koml. & Moncada
- **Adenorandia** Vermoesen
- Adenosacme Wall. ex Endl. = Mycetia Reinw.
- Adenothola Lem. = Manettia Mutis
- **Adina** Salisb.
- Adinauclea Ridsdale = Adina Salisb.
- **Adolphoduckea** Paudyal & Delprete
- Aeginetia Cav. = Bouvardia Salisb.
- Aetheonema (DC. ex Endl.) Rchb. = Gaertnera Lam.
- **Afrocanthium** (Bridson) Lantz & B.Bremer
- Afrohamelia Wernham = Atractogyne Pierre
- Afroknoxia Verdc. = Knoxia L.
- **Agathisanthemum** Klotzsch
- **Agouticarpa** C.H.Perss.
- Agylophora Neck. ex Raf. = Uncaria Schreb.
- **Aidia** Lour.
- **Aidiopsis** Tirveng.
- **Airosperma** K.Schum. & Lauterb.
- **Aitchisonia** Hemsl. ex Aitch.
- **Alatostigma** De Block
- **Alberta** E.Mey.
- **Aleisanthia** Ridl.
- **Aleisanthiopsis** Tange
- **Alibertia** A.Rich.
- Allaeophania Thwaites = Hedyotis L.
- Alleizettea Dubard & Dop = Danais Comm. ex Vent.
- **Alleizettella** Pit.
- Allemaoa Hoffsgg. ex Schltdl. = Isertia Schreb.
- Allenanthus Standl. = Machaonia Bonpl.
- **Alseis** Schott
- **Amaioua** Aubl.
- **Amaracarpus** Blume
- Amaralia Welw. ex Benth. & Hook.f. = Sherbournia G.Don
- Ambraria Cruse = Nenax Gaertn.
- Ambraria Heist. ex Fabr. = Anthospermum L.
- Ammianthus Spruce ex Benth. & Hook.f. = Retiniphyllum Bonpl.
- **Amphiasma** Bremek.
- **Amphidasya** Standl.
- **Amphistemon** Groeninckx
- Anabata Willd. ex Roem. & Schult. = Faramea Aubl.
- Ancylanthos Desf. = Vangueria Juss.
- Andersonia Willd. ex Roem. & Schult. = Gaertnera Lam.
- Androtropis R.Br. ex Wall. = Acranthera Arn. ex Meisn.
- Anisomeris C.Presl = Chomelia Jacq.
- Anistelma Raf. = Hedyotis L.
- Anomanthodia Hook.f. = Aidia Lour.
- Anotis DC. = Houstonia Gronov.
- Antacanthus Rich. ex DC. = Scolosanthus Vahl
- **Antherostele** Bremek.
- Antherura Lour. = Psychotria L.
- Anthocephalus A.Rich. = Breonia A.Rich.
- **Anthorrhiza** C.R.Huxley & Jebb
- **Anthospermopsis** (K.Schum.) J.H.Kirkbr.
- **Anthospermum** L.
- **Antirhea** Comm. ex Juss.
- Antoniana Tussac = Faramea Aubl.
- **Aoranthe** Somers
- Aparinanthus Fourr. = Galium L.
- Aparine Guett. = Galium L.
- Aparinella Fourr. = Galium L.
- Aphaenandra Miq. = Mussaenda L.
- **Aphanocarpus** Steyerm.
- Apomuria Bremek. = Psychotria L.
- Apona Schumach. & Thonn. = Argostemma Wall.
- Appunettia R.D.Good = Morinda L.
- **Appunia** Hook.f.
- Arachnimorpha Desv. = Rondeletia L.
- **Arachnothryx** Planch.
- Arariba Mart. = Simira Aubl.
- Arbulocarpus Tennant = Spermacoce L.
- **Arcytophyllum** Willd. ex Roem. & Schult.
- Argocoffea (Pierre ex De Wild.) Lebrun = Argocoffeopsis Lebrun
- **Argocoffeopsis** Lebrun
- **Argostemma** Wall.
- Argostemmella Ridl. = Argostemma Wall.
- Ariadne Urb. = Mazaea Krug & Urb.
- Arthronia Nutt. = Coprosma J.R.Forst. & G.Forst.
- Asemanthia (Stapf)Ridl. = Mussaenda L.
- Asemnantha Hook.f. = Chiococca P.Browne
- Aspera Moench = Galium L.
- × Asperugalium E.Fourn. = × Galiasperula Ronniger
- **Asperula** L.
- Aspidanthera Benth. = Ferdinandusa Pohl
- Assidora A.Chev. = Schumanniophyton Harms
- Asterophyllum K.F.Schimp. & Spenn. = Asperula L.
- **Astiella** Jovet
- **Atractocarpus** Schltr. & K.Krause
- **Atractogyne** Pierre
- Aucubaephyllum Ahlb. = Psychotria L.
- **Augusta** Pohl
- **Aulacocalyx** Hook.f.
- Aulacodiscus Hook.f. = Urophyllum Wall.
- Axanthes Blume = Urophyllum Wall.
- Axanthopsis Korth. = Urophyllum Wall.
- Axolus Raf. = Cephalanthus L.

== B ==
- Baconia DC. = Pavetta L.
- **Badusa** A.Gray
- Baldingera Dennst. = Psychotria L.
- Balfourina Kuntze = Didymaea Hook.f.
- **Balmea** Martinez
- Bancalus Rumph. ex Kuntze = Nauclea L.
- Bantiala Dauphinot = Myrmecodia Jack
- Bartlingia Rchb. = Plocama Aiton
- Bartramia W.Bartram = Pinckneya Michx.
- Basanacantha Hook.f. = Randia L.
- Bataprine Nieuwl. = Galium L.
- **Bathysa** C.Presl
- Bathysograya Kuntze = Badusa A.Gray
- **Batopedina** Verdc.
- Baumannia K.Schum. = Knoxia L.
- Baumannia DC. = Damnacanthus C.F.Gaertn.
- Becheria Ridl. = Ixora L.
- Belicea Lundell = Morinda L.
- Belilla Adans. = Mussaenda L.
- Bellardia Schreb. = Coccocypselum P.Browne
- Bellermannia Klotzsch ex H.Karst. = Gonzalagunia Ruiz & Pav.
- Bellizinca Borhidi = Deppea Schltdl. & Cham.
- Bellynkxia Müll.Arg. = Appunia Hook.f.
- **Belonophora** Hook.f.
- Bemsetia Raf. = Ixora L.
- **Benkara** Adans.
- Benteca Adans. = Hymenodictyon Wall.
- **Benzonia** Schumach.
- **Berghesia** Nees
- Bergkias Sonn. = Gardenia J.Ellis
- Berliera Buch.-Ham. ex Wall. = Mycetia R.Br. ex Hook.
- **Bertiera** Aubl.
- Bigelovia Spreng. = Spermacoce L.
- **Bikkia** Reinw. ex Blume
- Bikkiopsis Brongn. & Gris = Bikkia Reinw. ex Blume
- Billardiera Vahl = Coussarea Aubl.
- Billiottia DC. = Melanopsidium Colla
- Blandibractea Wernham = Simira Aubl.
- **Blepharidium** Standl.
- Blepharostemma Ridl. = Asperula L.
- **Bobea** Gaudich.
- **Boholia** Merr.
- Bonatia Schltr. & K.Krause = Tarenna Gaertn.
- Bonifacia Silva Manso ex Steud. = Augusta Pohl
- Borojoa Cuatrec. = Alibertia A.Rich.
- Borreria G.Mey. = Spermacoce L.
- **Bothriospora** Hook.f.
- **Botryarrhena** Ducke
- **Bouvardia** Salisb.
- **Brachytome** Hook.f.
- **Bradea** Standl. ex Brade
- **Bremeria** Razafim. & Alejandro
- **Brenania** Keay
- **Breonadia** Ridsdale
- **Breonia** A.Rich.
- **Bridsonia** Verstraete & A.E.van Wyk
- Brignolia DC. = Isertia Schreb.
- Bruinsmania Miq. = Isertia Schreb.
- Bubalina Raf. = Burchellia R.Br.
- Buchia Kunth = Perama Aubl.
- Buchozia L'Hér. = Serissa Comm. ex Juss.
- Buena Cav. = Gonzalagunia Ruiz & Pav.
- Buena Pohl = Cosmibuena Ruiz & Pav.
- **Bullockia** (Bridson) Razafim., Lantz & B.Bremer
- Bunburya Meisn. ex Hochst. = Tricalysia A.Rich.
- **Bungarimba** K.M.Wong
- Bunophila Willd. ex Roem. & Schult. = Machaonia Bonpl.
- Bupleuroides Moench = Phyllis L.
- **Burchellia** R.Br.
- Burneya Cham. & Schltdl. = Timonius Rumph. ex DC.
- Burttdavya Hoyle = Nauclea L.
- Buseria T.Durand = Coffea L.
- Buttneria P.Browne = Casasia A.Rich.
- **Byrsophyllum** Hook.f.

== C ==
- Cadamba Sonn. = Guettarda L.
- Cafe Adans. = Coffea L.
- Calanda K.Schum. = Pentanisia Harv.
- Calderonia Standl. = Simira Aubl.
- Calisaya hort. ex Pav. = Cinchona L.
- Callicocca Schreb. = Palicourea Aubl.
- **Callipeltis** Steven
- **Calochone** Keay
- Calycodendron A.C.Sm. = Psychotria L.
- **Calycophyllum** DC.
- **Calycosia** A.Gray
- **Calycosiphonia** Pierre ex Robbr.
- Campanocalyx Valeton = Ophiorrhiza L.
- Camptophytum Pierre ex A.Chev. = Tarenna Gaertn.
- Camptopus Hook.f. = Psychotria L.
- Campylobotrys Lem. = Hoffmannia Sw.
- **Canephora** Juss.
- Canthiopsis Seem. = Tarenna Gaertn.
- **Canthium** Lam.
- **Canthiumera** K.M.Wong & Mahyuni
- Canthopsis Miq. = Tarenna Gaertn.
- **Capirona** Spruce
- Captaincookia N.Hallé = Ixora L.
- Caquepiria J.F.Gmel. = Gardenia J.Ellis
- **Carajasia** R.M.Salas, E.L.Cabral & Dessein
- Caranda Gaertn. = Psydrax Gaertn.
- **Carapichea** Aubl.
- Carinta W.Wight = Geophila D.Don
- Carmenocania Wernham = Pogonopus Klotzsch
- **Carpacoce** Sond.
- **Carphalea** Juss.
- Carpothalis E.Mey. = Empogona Hook.f.
- **Carterella** Terrell
- Caruelina Kuntze = Chomelia Jacq.
- Caryococca Willd. ex Roem. & Schult. = Gonzalagunia Ruiz & Pav.
- **Casasia** A.Rich.
- Cascarilla (Endl.) Wedd. = Ladenbergia Klotzsch
- Cassupa Bonpl. = Isertia Schreb.
- **Castrila** Blanca, S.Ben-Menni, H.Blanca, Cueto, J.Fuentes, Ortega Oliv. & Suár.-Sant.
- **Catesbaea** Gronov.
- Catsjopiri Rumph. ex Burm. = Gardenia J.Ellis
- **Catunaregam** Wolf
- Cephaelis Sw. = Psychotria L.
- **Cephalanthus** L.
- Cephalidium A.Rich. = Breonia A.Rich.
- Cephalina Thonn. = Nauclea L.
- Cephalodendron Steyerm. = Remijia DC.
- Ceratites Sol. ex Miers = Rudgea Salisb.
- **Ceratopyxis** Hook.f.
- **Ceriscoides** (Benth. & Hook.f.) Tirveng.
- Ceriscus Gaertn. = Catunaregam Wolf
- Ceuthocarpus Aiello = Schmidtottia Urb.
- Chaenocarpus Neck. ex A.Juss. = Spermacoce L.
- **Chaetostachydium** Airy Shaw
- Chaetostachys Valeton = Chaetostachydium Airy Shaw
- Chalazocarpus Hiern = Schumanniophyton Harms
- **Chalepophyllum** Hook.f.
- Chamaedaphne Mitch. = Mitchella L.
- **Chamaepentas** Bremek.
- Chamisme Nieuwl. = Houstonia Gronov.
- **Chapelieria** A.Rich.
- Charpentiera Vieill. = Ixora L.
- **Chassalia** Comm. ex Poir.
- Chazaliella E.M.A.Petit & Verdc. = Eumachia DC.
- Chenocarpus Neck. = Spermacoce L.
- Chesnea Scop. = Carapichea Aubl.
- **Chewlunia** Junhao Chen, P.K.Hoo & K.M.Wong
- Chicoinaea Comm. ex DC. = Psychotria L.
- **Chimarrhis** Jacq.
- **Chiococca** P.Browne
- **Chione** DC.
- Chlorochorion Puff & Robbr. = Pentanisia Harv.
- Chlorostemma (Lange) Fourr. = Galium L.
- **Chomelia** Jacq.
- Chomelia L. = Tarenna Gaertn.
- Chondrococcus Steyerm. = Coccochondra Rauschert
- Choristes Benth. = Deppea Schltdl. & Cham.
- Choulettia Pomel = Plocama Aiton
- Chrozorrhiza Ehrh. = Asperula L.
- Chrysoxylon Wedd. = Pogonopus Klotzsch
- Chytropsia Bremek. = Eumachia DC.
- Cigarrilla Aiello = Nernstia Urb.
- **Ciliosemina** Antonelli
- **Cinchona** L.
- **Cinchonopsis** L.Andersson
- **Cladoceras** Bremek.
- **Clarkella** Hook.f.
- Clavenna Neck. ex Standl. = Lucya DC.
- **Clavistigma** T.Y.Tu & P.W.Xie
- Cleisocratera Korth. = Saprosma Blume
- Clusiophyllea Baill. = Peponidium (Baill.) Arènes
- **Coccochondra** Rauschert
- **Coccocypselum** P.Browne
- Codaria L. = Lerchea L.
- **Coddia** Verdc.
- Coddingtonia Bowdich = Psychotria L.
- Codonocalyx Miers ex Lindl. = Psychotria L.
- **Coelopyrena** Valeton
- **Coelospermum** Blume
- Cofeanthus A.Chev. = Coffea L.
- **Coffea** L.
- Coleactina N.Hallé = Leptactina Hook.f.
- Colladonia Spreng. = Palicourea Aubl.
- **Colleteria** David W.Taylor
- **Colletoecema** E.M.A.Petit
- Commianthus Benth. = Retiniphyllum Bonpl.
- Commitheca Bremek. = Pauridiantha Hook.f.
- Condalia Ruiz & Pav. = Coccocypselum P.Browne
- **Condaminea** DC.
- Congdonia Müll.Arg. = Declieuxia Kunth
- **Conjugatovarium** S.S.Ying
- Conosiphon Poepp. & Endl. = Sphinctanthus Benth.
- **Conostomium** (Stapf) Cufod.
- Conotrichia A.Rich. = Manettia Mutis
- **Coprosma** J.R.Forst. & G.Forst.
- **Coptophyllum** Korth.
- **Coptosapelta** Korth.
- **Coptosperma** Hook.f.
- Cordia Neck. = Spermacoce L.
- **Cordiera** A.Rich.
- **Cordylostigma** Groeninckx & Dessein
- Cormigonus Raf. = Bikkia Reinw. ex Blume
- Cormylus Raf. = Scleromitrion (Wight & Arn.) Meisn.
- **Corynanthe** Welw.
- Corynula Hook.f. = Leptostigma Arn.
- **Coryphothamnus** Steyerm.
- **Cosmibuena** Ruiz & Pav.
- **Cosmocalyx** Standl.
- Coupoui Aubl. = Duroia L.f.
- Coursiana Homolle = Payera Baill.
- **Coussarea** Aubl.
- **Coutaportla** Urb.
- **Coutarea** Aubl.
- **Coutareopsis** Paudyal & Delprete
- Covolia Neck. = Spermacoce L.
- **Cowiea** Wernham
- **Craterispermum** Benth.
- Creaghia Scort. = Mussaendopsis Baill.
- Creatantha Standl. = Isertia Schreb.
- **Cremaspora** Benth.
- Cremocarpon Boivin ex Baill. = Psychotria L.
- Crinita Houtt. = Pavetta L.
- **Crobylanthe** Bremek.
- Crocyllis E.Mey. ex Hook.f. = Plocama Aiton
- **Crossopteryx** Fenzl
- **Crucianella** L.
- **Cruciata** Mill.
- **Cruckshanksia** Hook. & Arn.
- Crusea A.Rich. = Chione DC.
- **Crusea** Schltdl. & Cham.
- Cryptocalycia Welw. = Argocoffeopsis Lebrun
- Cryptospermum Young ex Pers. = Opercularia Gaertn.
- Csapodya Borhidi = Deppea Schltdl. & Cham.
- Cuatrecasasiodendron Standl. & Steyerm. = Arachnothryx Planch.
- **Cubanola** Aiello
- Cucullaria Kramer ex Kuntze = Callipeltis Steven
- Cuncea Buch.-Ham. ex D.Don = Knoxia L.
- Cunina Clos = Nertera Banks ex Sol.
- Cunninghamia Schreb. = Malanea Aubl.
- Cupi Adans. = Tarenna Gaertn.
- Cupia DC. = Aidia Lour.
- Cupirana Miers = Duroia L.f.
- **Cuviera** DC.
- **Cyanoneuron** Tange
- **Cyclophyllum** Hook.f.
- Cymelonema C.Presl = Urophyllum Wall.
- Cynanchica Fourr. = Asperula L.
- **Cynanchica** P.Caputo & Del Guacchio
- Cynocrambe Gagnebin = Theligonum L.
- Cyrtanthus Schreb. = Posoqueria Aubl.

== D ==
- **Damnacanthus** C.F.Gaertn.
- **Danais** Comm. ex Vent.
- Darluca Raf. = Faramea Aubl.
- Dasus Lour. = Lasianthus Jack
- Dasycephala (DC.) Benth. & Hook.f. = Spermacoce L.
- Daun-contu Adans. = Paederia L.
- **Debia** Neupane & N.Wikstr.
- Decameria Welw. = Gardenia J.Ellis
- Decapenta Raf. = Diodia L.
- **Deccania** Tirveng.
- **Declieuxia** Kunth
- Delpechia Montrouz. = Psychotria L.
- Democritea DC. = Serissa Comm. ex Juss.
- **Dendrosipanea** Ducke
- **Denscantia** E.L.Cabral & Bacigalupo
- **Dentella** J.R.Forst. & G.Forst.
- Dentillaria Kuntze = Knoxia L.
- **Deppea** Cham. & Schltdl.
- Deppeopsis Borhidi & Strancz = Deppea Schltdl. & Cham.
- **Diacrodon** Sprague
- **Diadorimia** J.A.M.Carmo, Florentín & R.M.Salas
- **Dialypetalanthus** Kuhlm.
- **Dibrachionostylus** Bremek.
- **Dibridsonia** K.M.Wong
- **Dichilanthe** Thwaites
- Dichrospermum Bremek. = Spermacoce L.
- Dicrobotryum Willd. ex Roem. & Schult. = Guettarda L.
- Dictyandra Welw. ex Benth. & Hook.f. = Leptactina Hook.f.
- **Didymaea** Hook.f.
- **Didymochlamys** Hook.f.
- Didymoecium Bremek. = Rennellia Korth.
- **Didymopogon** Bremek.
- **Didymosalpinx** Keay
- Dillenia Heist. ex Fabr. = Sherardia L.
- **Dimetia** (Wight & Arn.) Meisn.
- Dinocanthium Bremek. = Pyrostria Comm. ex Juss.
- Diodella Small = Hexasepalum Bartl. ex DC.
- **Diodia** Gronov.
- Diodioides Loefl. = Spermacoce L.
- Diodois Pohl = Tapanhuacanga Vell. ex Vand.
- **Dioecrescis** Tirveng.
- **Dioicodendron** Steyerm.
- Dioneiodon Raf. = Diodia L.
- Diotocarpus Hochst. = Pentanisia Harv.
- Diotocranus Bremek. = Mitrasacmopsis Jovet
- Diphragmus C.Presl = Tessiera Miq.
- Diplocrater Hook.f. = Tricalysia A.Rich.
- Diplophragma (Wight & Arn.) Meisn. = Hedyotis L.
- **Diplospora** DC.
- Diplosporopsis Wernham = Belonophora Hook.f.
- **Dirichletia** Klotzsch
- Discocoffea A.Chev. = Tricalysia A.Rich.
- **Discospermum** Dalzell
- Disodea Pers. = Paederia L.
- Disperma J.F.Gmel. = Mitchella L.
- **Ditrichanthus** Borhidi, E.Martínez & Ramos
- **Diyaminauclea** Ridsdale
- **Dolianthus** C.H.Wright
- Dolichanthera Schltr. & K.Krause = Thiollierea Montrouz.
- **Dolichocarpa** K.L.Gibbons
- **Dolichodelphys** K.Schum. & K.Krause
- **Dolicholobium** A.Gray
- **Dolichometra** K.Schum.
- **Dolichopentas** Kårehed & B.Bremer
- Dondisia DC. = Canthium Lam.
- Donkelaaria Lem. = Guettarda L.
- **Donnellyanthus** Borhidi
- Doricera Verdc. = Ixora L.
- Dorisia Gillespie = Mastixiodendron Melch.
- Dorothea Wernham = Aulacocalyx Hook.f.
- Douarrea Montrouz. = Psychotria L.
- Dressleriopsis Dwyer = Lasianthus Jack
- Duggena Vahl = Gonzalagunia Ruiz & Pav.
- Duhamelia Pers. = Hamelia Jacq.
- **Duidania** Standl.
- Dukea Dwyer = Raritebe Wernham
- Dunalia Spreng. = Lucya DC.
- **Dunnia** Tutcher
- **Duperrea** Pierre ex Pit.
- **Duroia** L.f.
- **Durringtonia** R.J.F.Hend. & Guymer
- Duvaucellia Bowdich = Kohautia Cham. & Schltdl.
- Dyctiospora Reinw. ex Korth. = Oldenlandia L.
- Dysoda Lour. = Serissa Comm. ex Juss.
- Dysodidendron Gardner = Saprosma Blume
- Dysosmia Miq. = Paralasianthus H.Zhu

== E ==
- Ebelia Rchb. = Galianthe Griseb.
- Echinodendrum A.Rich. = Catesbaea L.
- Ecpoma K.Schum. = Sabicea Aubl.
- Edechia Loefl. = Guettarda L.
- Edithea Standl. = Deppea Schltdl. & Cham.
- **Edrastima** Raf.
- Ehrenbergia Spreng. = Amaioua Aubl.
- Einsteinia Ducke = Kutchubaea Fisch. ex DC.
- Eionitis Bremek. = Oldenlandia L.
- **Eizia** Standl.
- **Elaeagia** Wedd.
- Elattospermum Soler. = Breonia A.Rich.
- **Eleuthranthes** F.Muell. ex Benth.
- **Emmenopterys** Oliv.
- **Emmeorhiza** Pohl ex Endl.
- **Empogona** Hook.f.
- Encopea C.Presl = Faramea Aubl.
- Endlichera C.Presl = Emmeorhiza Pohl ex Endl.
- Endolasia Turcz. = Manettia Mutis
- Endolithodes Bartl. = Retiniphyllum Bonpl.
- Endopogon Raf. = Hexasepalum Bartl. ex DC.
- Enterospermum Hiern = Coptosperma Hook.f.
- **Eosanthe** Urb.
- Epidendroides Sol. = Myrmecodia Jack
- Epitaberna K.Schum. = Heinsia DC.
- Epithinia Jack = Scyphiphora C.F.Gaertn.
- Ereicotis (DC.) Kuntze = Arcytophyllum Willd. ex Schult. & Schult.f.
- Eresimus Raf. = Cephalanthus L.
- **Eriosemopsis** Robyns
- Eriostoma Boivin ex Baill. = Empogona Hook.f.
- **Erithalis** P.Browne
- Erithalis G.Forst. = Timonius Rumph. ex DC.
- Ernestimeyera Kuntze = Alberta E.Mey.
- **Ernodea** Sw.
- Erythrodanum Thouars = Nertera Banks ex Sol.
- **Etericius** Desv. ex Ham.
- Euarthronia Nutt. ex A.Gray = Coprosma J.R.Forst. & G.Forst.
- **Euclinia** Salisb.
- Eukylista Benth. = Calycophyllum DC.
- **Eumachia** DC.
- Eumorphanthus A.C.Sm. = Psychotria L.
- Euosmia Bonpl. = Hoffmannia Sw.
- Eupyrena Wight & Arn. = Timonius Rumph. ex DC.
- Eurhotia Neck. = Psychotria L.
- Eurynome DC. = Coprosma J.R.Forst. & G.Forst.
- Evea Aubl. = Faramea Aubl.
- Everistia S.T.Reynolds & R.J.F.Hend. = Psydrax Gaertn.
- Evosmia Kunth = Hoffmannia Sw.
- **Exallage** Bremek.
- **Exallosperma** De Block
- Exandra Standl. = Simira Aubl.
- Exechostylus K.Schum. = Pavetta L.
- Exosolenia Baill. ex Drake = Lemyrea (A.Chev.) A.Chev. & Beille
- **Exostema** (Pers.) Bonpl.
- Eyselia Neck. = Galium L.

== F ==
- **Fadogia** Schweinf.
- **Fadogiella** Robyns
- Fagerlindia Tirveng. = Benkara Adans.
- Fagraeopsis Gilg & Schltr. ex S.P.Darwin = Mastixiodendron Melch.
- **Faramea** Aubl.
- Ferdinandea Pohl = Ferdinandusa Pohl
- **Ferdinandusa** Pohl
- Fereiria Vell. ex Vand. = Hillia Jacq.
- **Feretia** Delile
- **Fergusonia** Hook.f.
- **Fernelia** Comm. ex Lam.
- Figuierea Montrouz. = Coelospermum Blume
- **Flagenium** Baill.
- Flemingia W.Hunter = Tarenna Gaertn.
- Fleroya Y.F.Deng = Mitragyna Korth.
- **Flexanthera** Rusby
- **Foonchewia** R.J.Wang
- Forsteronia Casar. ex K.Schum. = Molopanthera Turcz.
- **Fosbergia** Tirveng. & Sastre
- Foscarenia Vell. ex Vand. = Randia L.
- Franchetia Baill. = Breonia A.Rich.
- Franciella Guillaumin = Atractocarpus Schltr. & K.Krause
- Froelichia Vahl = Coussarea Aubl.
- Fructesca DC. ex Meisn. = Gaertnera Lam.
- Fuchsia Sw. = Schradera Vahl
- Furcatella Baum.-Bod. = Psychotria L.

== G ==
- **Gaertnera** Lam.
- Gaillonia A.Rich. = Plocama Aiton
- **Galianthe** Griseb.
- × Galiasperula Ronniger (unplaced)
- **Galiniera** Delile
- Galiopsis St.-Lag. = Asperula L.
- **× Galiphthisa** Z.H.Feng
- **Galium** L.
- **Gallienia** Dubard & Dop
- **Galopina** Thunb.
- Galvania Vand. = Palicourea Aubl.
- Gamotopea Bremek. = Psychotria L.
- **Ganguelia** Robbr.
- Garapatica H.Karst. = Cordiera A.Rich.
- **Gardenia** J.Ellis
- Gardeniola Cham. = Cordiera A.Rich.
- **Gardeniopsis** Miq.
- Gea Achille, nomen in herbario
- **Genipa** L.
- Genipella Rich. ex DC. = Alibertia A.Rich.
- Gentingia J.T.Johanss. & K.M.Wong = Rennellia Korth.
- Geobenthamia E.M.A.Petit = Hymenocoleus Robbr.
- Geocardia Standl. = Geophila D.Don
- Geoherpum Willd. ex Schult. & Schult.f. = Nertera Banks ex Sol.
- **Geophila** D.Don
- Gerontogea Cham. & Schltdl. = Oldenlandia L.
- Gilipus Raf. = Cephalanthus L.
- **Gillespiea** A.C.Sm.
- **Gleasonia** Standl.
- **Glionnetia** Tirveng.
- **Globulostylis** Wernham
- Gloneria André = Rudgea Salisb.
- **Glossostipula** Lorence
- Gomozia Mutis ex L.f. = Nertera Banks ex Sol.
- **Gomphocalyx** Baker
- Gomphosia Wedd. = Ferdinandusa Pohl
- Gonianthes A.Rich. = Cubanola Aiello
- Gonotheca Blume ex DC. = Leptopetalum Hook. & Arn.
- Gonyanera Korth. = Acranthera Arn. ex Meisn.
- **Gonzalagunia** Ruiz & Pav.
- Gonzalea Pers. = Gonzalagunia Ruiz & Pav.
- Gouldia A.Gray = Kadua Cham. & Schltdl.
- Graphophyllum Boivin = Psychotria L.
- **Greenea** Wight & Arn.
- **Greeniopsis** Merr.
- Griffithia Wight & Arn. = Benkara Adans.
- Grisia Brongn. = Thiollierea Montrouz.
- Gruhlmania Neck. = Spermacoce L.
- Grumilea Gaertn. = Psychotria L.
- Guagnebina Vell. = Manettia Mutis
- **Guettarda** L.
- **Guettardella** Champ. ex Benth.
- **Guihaiothamnus** H.S.Lo
- Guttenbergia Zoll. & Moritzi = Gynochthodes Blume
- **Gynochthodes** Blume
- Gynopachis Blume = Aidia Lour.
- **Gyrostipula** J.-F.Leroy

== H ==
- **Habroneuron** Standl.
- Haldina Ridsdale = Adina Salisb.
- Halesia P.Browne = Guettarda L.
- Hallea J.-F.Leroy = Mitragyna Korth.
- **Hamelia** Jacq.
- Hamiltonia Roxb. = Spermadictyon Roxb.
- Hayataella Masam. = Ophiorrhiza L.
- **Hedstromia** A.C.Sm.
- **Hedyotis** L.
- **Hedythyrsus** Bremek.
- **Heinsenia** K.Schum.
- **Heinsia** DC.
- **Hekistocarpa** Hook.f.
- **Helictosperma** De Block
- Helospora Jacq. = Timonius Rumph. ex DC.
- Hemidiodia K.Schum. = Spermacoce L.
- Henlea H.Karst. = Rustia Klotzsch
- **Henriquezia** Spruce ex Benth.
- Herrera Adans. = Erithalis P.Browne
- **Heterophyllaea** Hook.f.
- Hexactina Willd. = Amaioua Aubl.
- **Hexaphylla** (Klokov) P.Caputo & Del Guacchio
- **Hexasepalum** Bartl. ex DC.
- Hexepta Raf. = Coffea L.
- Hexodontocarpus Dulac = Sherardia L.
- Heymia Dennst. = Dentella J.R.Forst. & G.Forst.
- **Hillia** Jacq.
- **Himalrandia** T.Yamaz.
- **Hindsia** Benth.
- **Hintonia** Bullock
- **Hippotis** Ruiz & Pav.
- Hitoa Nadeaud = Ixora L.
- **Hodgkinsonia** F.Muell.
- **Hoffmannia** Sw.
- Holocarpa Baker = Pentanisia Harv.
- **Holstianthus** Steyerm.
- **Holtonia** Standl.
- Homaloclados Hook.f. = Faramea Aubl.
- **Homollea** Arènes
- Homolliella Arènes = Paracephaelis Baill.
- Hondbessen Adans. = Paederia L.
- **Houstonia** Gronov.
- Howardia Klotzsch = Pogonopus Klotzsch
- **Hutchinsonia** Robyns
- **Hydnophytum** Jack
- **Hydrophylax** L.f.
- Hymendocarpum Pierre ex Pit. = Nostolachma T.Durand
- Hymenocnemis Hook.f. = Gaertnera Lam.
- **Hymenocoleus** Robbr.
- **Hymenodictyon** Wall.
- Hymenopogon Wall. = Neohymenopogon Bennet
- **Hyperacanthus** E.Mey. ex Bridson
- **Hypobathrum** Blume
- Hypodematium A.Rich. = Spermacoce L.
- **Hyptianthera** Wight & Arn.

== I ==
- Ibetralia Bremek. = Kutchubaea Fisch. ex DC.
- Imantina Hook.f. = Gynochthodes Blume
- Indopolysolenia Bennet = Leptomischus Drake
- **Involucrella** (Benth. & Hook.f.) Neupane & N.Wikstr.
- Ipecacuanha Arruda = Carapichea Aubl.
- Ipecacuana Raf. = Carapichea Aubl.
- **Ipotaraguapin** Loefl.
- **Isertia** Schreb.
- **Isidorea** A.Rich.
- **Ixora** L.

== J ==
- Jackia Wall. = Jackiopsis Ridsdale
- **Jackiopsis** Ridsdale
- Jainia N.P.Balakr. = Coptophyllum Korth.
- **Jamaicanthus** Borhidi
- **Janotia** J.-F.Leroy
- **Januaria** R.M.Salas & Nuñez Florentin
- Jaubertia Guill. = Plocama Aiton
- Javorkaea Borhidi & Jarai-Koml. = Arachnothryx Planch.
- **Joosia** H.Karst.
- **Jovetia** Guédès
- Jurgensia Raf. = Spermacoce L.
- Justenia Hiern = Bertiera Aubl.

== K ==
- **Kadua** Cham. & Schltdl.
- **Kailarsenia** Tirveng.
- **Kajewskiella** Merr. & L.M.Perry
- **Kanapia** Arriola & Alejandro
- Karamyschewia Fisch. & C.A.Mey. = Oldenlandia L.
- Kasailo Dennst. ex Kostel. = Hymenodictyon Wall.
- Katoutheka Adans. = Wendlandia Bartl. ex DC.
- Keenania Hook.f. = Ophiorrhiza L.
- **Keetia** E.Phillips
- **Kelloggia** Torr. ex Hook.f.
- **Kerianthera** J.H.Kirkbr.
- Kerstingia K.Schum. = Belonophora Hook.f.
- **Khasiaclunea** Ridsdale
- **Kindia** Cheek
- Kinkina Adans. = Cinchona L.
- **Klossia** Ridl.
- **Knoxia** L.
- **Kochummenia** K.M.Wong
- Koehneago Kuntze = Hoffmannia Sw.
- **Kohautia** Cham. & Schltdl.
- **Kraussia** Harv.
- Kumbaya Endl. ex Steud. = Gardenia J.Ellis
- **Kupeantha** Cheek
- Kurria Hochst. & Steud. = Hymenodictyon Wall.
- **Kutchubaea** Fisch. ex DC.

== L ==
- Lachnastoma Korth. = Nostolachma T.Durand
- Lachnosiphonium Hochst. = Catunaregam Wolf
- **Ladenbergia** Klotzsch
- Lagotis E.Mey. = Carpacoce Sond.
- Lagynias E.Mey. ex Robyns = Vangueria Juss.
- **Lamprothamnus** Hiern
- Landia Comm. ex Juss. = Mussaenda L.
- **Landiopsis** Capuron ex Bosser
- **Larsenaikia** Tirveng.
- **Lasianthus** Jack
- Lasionema D.Don = Macrocnemum P.Browne
- Lasiostoma Benth. = Hydnophytum Jack
- **Lathraeocarpa** Bremek.
- Laugeria Vahl ex Hook.f. = Stenostomum C.F.Gaertn.
- Laugieria Jacq. = Guettarda L.
- Lawia Wight = Mycetia Reinw.
- Laxmannia S.G.Gmel. ex Trin. = Phuopsis (Griseb.) Hook.f.
- **Lecananthus** Jack
- Lecanosperma Rusby = Heterophyllaea Hook.f.
- **Lecariocalyx** Bremek.
- Lecontea A.Rich. = Paederia L.
- Leiochilus Hook.f. = Coffea L.
- **Lelya** Bremek.
- Lemairea de Vriese = Mycetia Reinw.
- **Lemyrea** (A.Chev.) A.Chev. & Beille
- **Leonoria** Nuñez Florentin & R.M.Salas
- **Lepidostoma** Bremek.
- Lepipogon G.Bertol. = Catunaregam Wolf
- **Leptactina** Hook.f.
- **Leptodermis** Wall.
- **Leptomischus** Drake
- **Leptopetalum** Hook. & Arn.
- **Leptoscela** Hook.f.
- **Leptostigma** Arn.
- Leptunis Steven = Asperula L.
- **Lerchea** L.
- Leroyia Cavaco = Pyrostria Comm. ex Juss.
- **Leucocodon** Gardner
- **Leucolophus** Bremek.
- Lightfootia Schreb. = Rondeletia L.
- **Limnosipanea** Hook.f.
- Lindenia Benth. = Augusta Pohl
- **Lintersemina** Humberto Mend., Celis & M.A.González
- Lipostoma D.Don = Coccocypselum P.Browne
- Lippaya Endl. = Dentella J.R.Forst. & G.Forst.
- Listeria Neck. ex Raf. = Oldenlandia L.
- Litosanthes Blume = Lasianthus Jack
- Lonicera Adans. = Hamelia Jacq.
- Lorencea Borhidi = Coutaportla Urb.
- Loretoa Standl. = Capirona Spruce
- Lucinaea DC. = Schradera Vahl
- **Luculia** Sweet
- **Lucya** DC.
- **Ludekia** Ridsdale
- Ludovica Vieill. ex Guillaumin = Bikkia Reinw. ex Blume
- Lycioserissa Roem. & Schult. = Canthium Lam.
- Lygistum P.Browne = Manettia Mutis
- Lygodisodea Ruiz & Pav. = Paederia L.

== M ==
- **Macbrideina** Standl.
- **Machaonia** Bonpl.
- Macrandria (Wight & Arn.) Meisn. = Hedyotis L.
- Macrocalyx Miers ex Lindl. = Psychotria L.
- **Macrocnemum** P.Browne
- Macrocneumum Vand. = Remijia DC.
- Macrosiphon Miq. = Hindsia Benth. ex Lindl.
- **Macrosphyra** Hook.f.
- **Maguireocharis** Steyerm.
- **Maguireothamnus** Steyerm.
- **Malanea** Aubl.
- Mallostoma H.Karst. = Arcytophyllum Willd. ex Schult. & Schult.f.
- Mamboga Blanco = Mitragyna Korth.
- **Manettia** Mutis
- **Manostachya** Bremek.
- **Mantalania** Capuron ex J.-F.Leroy
- Mapouria Aubl. = Psychotria L.
- Mappia Hablitz ex Ledeb. = Crucianella L.
- Margaris Griseb. = Eumachia DC.
- Margaritopsis C.Wright = Eumachia DC.
- Marquisia A.Rich. = Coprosma J.R.Forst. & G.Forst.
- **Martensianthus** Borhidi & Lozada-Pérez
- Martha F.J.Müll. = Posoqueria Aubl.
- Maschalanthe Blume = Urophyllum Wall.
- Maschalocorymbus Bremek. = Urophyllum Wall.
- **Maschalodesme** K.Schum. & Lauterb.
- **Massularia** (K.Schum.) Hoyle
- **Mastixiodendron** Melch.
- Matthiola Plum. ex L. = Guettarda L.
- Mattuschkaea Schreb. = Perama Aubl.
- **Mazaea** Krug & Urb.
- Megacarpha Hochst. = Oxyanthus DC.
- Megalopus K.Schum. = Psychotria L.
- Megaphyllum Spruce ex Baill. = Pentagonia Benth.
- Meionandra Gauba = Valantia L.
- Melachone Gilli = Amaracarpus Blume
- **Melanopsidium** Colla
- Melanopsidium Poit. ex A.Rich. = Alibertia A.Rich.
- **Melanoxerus** Kainul. & B.Bremer
- Menestoria DC. = Mussaenda L.
- Mephitidia Reinw. ex Blume = Lasianthus Jack
- **Mericarpaea** Boiss.
- Mericocalyx Bamps = Otiophora Zucc.
- Merismostigma S.Moore = Coelospermum Blume
- **Merumea** Steyerm.
- Mesoptera Hook.f. = Psydrax Gaertn.
- Metabolos Blume = Hedyotis L.
- Metadina Bakh.f. = Adina Salisb.
- Mexocarpus Borhidi, E.Martínez & Ramos = Palicourea Aubl.
- **Mexotis** Terrell & H.Rob.
- **Meyna** Roxb. ex Link
- **Micrasepalum** Urb.
- **Microphysa** Schrenk
- Microsplenium Hook.f. = Machaonia Bonpl.
- **Mitchella** L.
- **Mitracarpus** Zucc.
- **Mitragyna** Korth.
- **Mitrasacmopsis** Jovet
- Mitrastigma Harv. = Psydrax Gaertn.
- Mitratheca K.Schum. = Oldenlandia L.
- Mitreola Boehm. = Ophiorrhiza L.
- **Mitriostigma** Hochst.
- **Molopanthera** Turcz.
- Monadelphanthus H.Karst. = Capirona Spruce
- **Monosalpinx** N.Hallé
- Montamans Dwyer = Notopleura (Hook.f.) Bremek.
- **Morelia** A.Rich.
- Morierina Vieill. = Thiollierea Montrouz.
- **Morinda** L.
- **Morindopsis** Hook.f.
- Motleyia J.T.Johanss. = Prismatomeris Thwaites
- **Motleyothamnus** Paudyal & Delprete
- **Mouretia** Pit.
- **Multidentia** Gilli
- Mungos Adans. = Ophiorrhiza L.
- **Mussaenda** L.
- **Mussaendopsis** Baill.
- Muzonia N.Osorio = Ladenbergia Klotzsch
- **Mycetia** Reinw.
- Myonima Comm. ex Juss. = Ixora L.
- Myrioneuron R.Br. ex Benth. & Hook. = Mycetia Reinw.
- **Myrmecodia** Jack
- **Myrmeconauclea** Merr.
- Myrmedoma Becc. = Myrmephytum Becc.
- **Myrmephytum** Becc.
- Myrstiphyllum P.Browne = Psychotria L.

== N ==
- Nacibea Aubl. = Manettia Mutis
- Naletonia Bremek. = Palicourea Aubl.
- Narega Raf. = Catunaregam Wolf
- **Nargedia** Bedd.
- Natalanthe Sond. = Tricalysia A.Rich.
- **Nauclea** L.
- Nauclea Korth. = Neonauclea Merr.
- **Neanotis** W.H.Lewis
- **Neblinathamnus** Steyerm.
- **Nematostylis** Hook.f.
- Nemostylis Steven = Phuopsis (Griseb.) Hook.f.
- **Nenax** Gaertn.
- Neobaumannia Hutch. & Dalziel = Knoxia L.
- **Neobertiera** Wernham
- **Neoblakea** Standl.
- Neobreonia Ridsdale = Breonia A.Rich.
- Neofranciella Guillaumin = Atractocarpus Schltr. & K.Krause
- Neogaillonia Lincz. = Plocama Aiton
- **Neohymenopogon** Bennet
- **Neolamarckia** Bosser
- Neolaugeria Nicolson = Stenostomum C.F.Gaertn.
- Neoleroya Cavaco = Pyrostria Comm. ex Juss.
- Neomartensia Borhidi & Lozada-Pérez = Martensianthus Borhidi & Lozada-Pérez
- Neomazaea Urb. = Mazaea Krug & Urb.
- **Neomussaenda** Tange
- **Neonauclea** Merr.
- Neopentanisia Verdc. = Pentanisia Harv.
- Neorosea N.Hallé = Tricalysia A.Rich.
- Neosabicea Wernham = Manettia Mutis
- Neoschimpera Hemsl. = Amaracarpus Blume
- **Nernstia** Urb.
- **Nertera** Banks ex Gaertn.
- Nescidia A.Rich. = Coffea L.
- **Nesohedyotis** (Hook.f.) Bremek.
- **Nesotarenna** De Block
- Nettlera Raf. = Carapichea Aubl.
- **Neurocalyx** Hook.
- Neurocarpaea R.Br. ex Hiern = Pentas Benth.
- **Nichallea** Bridson
- Nobula Adans. = Phyllis L.
- **Nodocarpaea** A.Gray
- Nonatelia Aubl. = Palicourea Aubl.
- **Normandia** Hook.f.
- **Nostolachma** T.Durand
- Nothophlebia Standl. = Pentagonia Benth.
- Notodontia Pierre ex Pit. = Lerchea L.
- **Notopleura** (Benth.) Bremek.

== O ==
- Obbea Hook.f. = Bobea Gaudich.
- **Ochreinauclea** Ridsdale & Bakh.f.
- Octavia DC. = Cordiera A.Rich.
- Octodon Thonn. = Spermacoce L.
- **Octotropis** Bedd.
- Ohigginsia Ruiz & Pav. = Hoffmannia Sw.
- **Oldenlandia** L.
- **Oldenlandiopsis** Terrell & W.H.Lewis
- **Oligocodon** Keay
- Olostyla DC. = Coelospermum Blume
- **Omiltemia** Standl.
- **Opercularia** Gaertn.
- **Ophiorrhiza** L.
- Ophryococcus Oerst. = Hoffmannia Sw.
- Oregandra Standl. = Chione DC.
- Oreocaryon Kuntze ex K.Schum. = Cruckshanksia Hook. & Arn.
- **Oreopolus** Schltdl.
- Oribasia Schreb. = Palicourea Aubl.
- Orthostemma Wall. ex Voigt = Pentas Benth.
- **Osa** Aiello
- Osmax Raf. = Palicourea Aubl.
- **Otiophora** Zucc.
- Otocalyx Brandegee = Arachnothryx Planch.
- Otocephalus Chiov. = Pentanisia Harv.
- **Otomeria** Benth.
- **Ottoschmidtia** Urb.
- Ourouparia Aubl. = Uncaria Schreb.
- **Oxyanthus** DC.
- **Oxyceros** Lour.
- Oxyspermum Eckl. & Zeyh. = Galopina Thunb.

== P ==
- Pachysanthus C.Presl = Rudgea Salisb.
- Pachystigma Hochst. = Vangueria Juss.
- **Pachystylus** K.Schum.
- **Paederia** L.
- Paederiopsis Rusby = Paederia L.
- Paedicalyx Pierre ex Pit. = Xanthophytum Reinw. ex Blume
- **Pagamea** Aubl.
- **Pagameopsis** Steyerm.
- **Paganuccia** R.M.Salas
- Pagosperma Pierre = Coffea L.
- Paiva Vell. = Sabicea Aubl.
- **Palicourea** Aubl.
- Pallasia Klotzsch = Wittmackanthus Kuntze
- Palovea Raf. = Sabicea Aubl.
- Pamplethantha Bremek. = Pauridiantha Hook.f.
- Panchezia Montrouz. = Ixora L.
- Panetos Raf. = Houstonia Gronov.
- Paolia Chiov. = Coffea L.
- Pappostylum Pierre = Cremaspora Benth.
- **Paracarphalea** Razafim., Ferm, B.Bremer & Kårehed
- **Paracephaelis** Baill.
- **Parachimarrhis** Ducke
- Paracoffea J.-F.Leroy = Coffea L.
- **Paracorynanthe** Capuron
- Paradina Pierre ex Pit. = Mitragyna Korth.
- **Paragenipa** Baill.
- Paragophyton K.Schum. = Spermacoce L.
- **Parainvolucrella** R.J.Wang
- **Paraknoxia** Bremek.
- **Paralasianthus** H.Zhu
- **Paranotis** Pedley ex K.L.Gibbons
- **Parapentas** Bremek.
- Paratriaina Bremek. = Triainolepis Hook.f.
- Patabea Aubl. = Ixora L.
- **Patima** Aubl.
- Patsjotti Adans. = Strumpfia Jacq.
- **Pauridiantha** Hook.f.
- Pausinystalia Pierre = Corynanthe Welw.
- Pavate Adans. = Pavetta L.
- **Pavetta** L.
- **Payera** Baill.
- Pecheya Scop. = Coussarea Aubl.
- Pelagodendron Seem. = Aidia Lour.
- Pelaphia Banks & Sol. ex A.Cunn. = Coprosma J.R.Forst. & G.Forst.
- Pelaphoides Banks & Sol. ex Cheeseman = Coprosma J.R.Forst. & G.Forst.
- Peltospermum Benth. = Sacosperma G.Taylor
- Pentacarpaea Hiern = Pentanisia Harv.
- Pentacorynium Bremek. = Paracorynanthe Capuron
- **Pentagonia** Benth.
- **Pentaloncha** Hook.f.
- **Pentanisia** Harv.
- **Pentanopsis** Rendle
- **Pentas** Benth.
- Pentaspora Boivin = Tricalysia A.Rich.
- **Pentodon** Hochst.
- **Peponidium** (Baill.) Arènes
- **Perakanthus** Robyns ex Ridl.
- **Perama** Aubl.
- Peratanthe Urb. = Nertera Banks ex Sol.
- Perdicesca Prov. = Mitchella L.
- **Peripeplus** Pierre
- Pertusadina Ridsdale = Adina Salisb.
- Pervillea Homolle ex Arènes = Homollea Arènes
- Petagomoa Bremek. = Palicourea Aubl.
- Petesia P.Browne = Rondeletia L.
- **Petitiocodon** Robbr.
- Petunga DC. = Hypobathrum Blume
- Phallaria Schumach. = Psydrax Gaertn.
- **Phellocalyx** Bridson
- **Phialanthus** Griseb.
- **Phialiphora** Groeninckx
- Phitopis Hook.f. = Schizocalyx Wedd.
- Phosanthus Raf. = Isertia Schreb.
- **Phuopsis** (Griseb.) Hook.f.
- Phylanthera Noronha = Hypobathrum Blume
- Phyllacanthus Hook.f. = Catesbaea L.
- **Phyllis** L.
- **Phyllocrater** Wernham
- **Phyllomelia** Griseb.
- **Phyllopentas** (Verdc.) Kårehed & B.Bremer
- **Phylohydrax** Puff
- Phyteumoides Smeathman ex DC. = Virectaria Bremek.
- **Picardaea** Urb.
- **Pimentelia** Wedd.
- **Pinarophyllon** Brandegee
- **Pinckneya** Michx.
- Piringa Juss. = Gardenia J.Ellis
- **Pitardella** Tirveng.
- Pittierothamnus Steyerm. = Amphidasya Standl.
- **Pittoniotis** Griseb.
- **Placocarpa** Hook.f.
- Placopoda Balf.f. = Dirichletia Klotzsch
- **Planaltina** R.M.Salas & E.L.Cabral
- Plastolaena Pierre ex A.Chev. = Schumanniophyton Harms
- Platanocarpum Korth. = Nauclea L.
- Platanocephalus Vaill. ex Crantz = Nauclea L.
- **Platycarpum** Bonpl.
- Platymerium Bartl. ex DC. = Villaria Rolfe
- Plectroniella Robyns = Canthium Lam.
- Pleimeris Raf. = Gardenia J.Ellis
- Pleiocarpidia K.Schum. = Urophyllum Wall.
- **Pleiocoryne** Rauschert
- Pleiocraterium Bremek. = Hedyotis L.
- Pleotheca Wall. = Ophiorrhiza L.
- Plethyrsis Raf. = Richardia L.
- Pleureia Raf. = Rudgea Salisb.
- Pleurocarpus Klotzsch = Melanopsidium Colla
- Pleurocoffea Baill. = Coffea L.
- **Plocama** Aiton
- **Plocaniophyllon** Brandegee
- Poecilocalyx Bremek. = Pauridiantha Hook.f.
- Pogonanthus Montrouz. = Gynochthodes Blume
- Pogonolobus F.Muell. = Coelospermum Blume
- **Pogonopus** Klotzsch
- Poiretia J.F.Gmel. = Houstonia Gronov.
- Polycoryne Keay = Pleiocoryne Rauschert
- Polycycliska Ridl. = Lerchea L.
- Polyozus Lour. = Psychotria L.
- Polyphragmon Desf. = Timonius Rumph. ex DC.
- Polysolen Rauschert = Leptomischus Drake
- Polysolenia Hook.f. = Leptomischus Drake
- **Polysphaeria** Hook.f.
- **Polyura** Hook.f.
- Pomangium Reinw. = Argostemma Wall.
- Pomatium C.F.Gaertn. = Bertiera Aubl.
- **Pomax** Sol. ex DC.
- Pomazota Ridl. = Coptophyllum Korth.
- Porocarpus Gaertn. = Timonius Rumph. ex DC.
- **Porterandia** Ridl.
- **Portlandia** P.Browne
- **Posoqueria** Aubl.
- Posoria Raf. = Posoqueria Aubl.
- Potima R.Hedw. = Faramea Aubl.
- **Pouchetia** A.Rich.
- **Praravinia** Korth.
- Pravinaria Bremek. = Urophyllum Wall.
- **Preussiodora** Keay
- Princea Dubard & Dop = Triainolepis Hook.f.
- **Prismatomeris** Thwaites
- Pristidia Thwaites = Gaertnera Lam.
- Probletostemon K.Schum. = Tricalysia A.Rich.
- Proscephaleium Korth. = Chassalia Comm. ex Poir.
- Psathura Comm. ex Juss. = Psychotria L.
- **Pseudaidia** Tirveng.
- Pseudixora Miq. = Aidia Lour.
- Pseudochimarrhis Ducke = Chimarrhis Jacq.
- Pseudocinchona A.Chev. = Corynanthe Welw.
- **Pseudocoptosperma** De Block
- **Pseudodiplospora** Deb
- Pseudogaillonia Lincz. = Plocama Aiton
- **Pseudogalium** L.E.Yang, Z.L.Nie & H.Sun
- Pseudogardenia Keay = Adenorandia Vermoesen
- **Pseudohamelia** Wernham
- **Pseudomantalania** J.-F.Leroy
- **Pseudomiltemia** Borhidi
- **Pseudomussaenda** Wernham
- **Pseudonesohedyotis** Tennant
- Pseudopeponidium Homolle ex Arènes = Pyrostria Comm. ex Juss.
- **Pseudopyxis** Miq.
- Pseudorandia Vermoesen = Rothmannia Thunb.
- Pseudosabicea N.Hallé = Sabicea Aubl.
- Pseudrachicallis H.Karst. = Arcytophyllum Willd. ex Schult. & Schult.f.
- Psilanthopsis A.Chev. = Coffea L.
- Psilanthus Hook.f. = Coffea L.
- Psilobium Jack = Acranthera Arn. ex Meisn.
- Psilostoma Klotzsch ex Eckl. & Zeyh. = Canthium Lam.
- **Psychotria** L.
- Psychotrophum P.Browne = Psychotria L.
- **Psydrax** Gaertn.
- Psyllocarpus Mart. & Zucc. = Tapanhuacanga Vell. ex Vand.
- Psyllocarpus Pohl ex DC. = Declieuxia Kunth
- **Pteridocalyx** Wernham
- Pterogaillonia Lincz. = Plocama Aiton
- Pterostephus C.Presl = Plocama Aiton
- Ptychodea Willd. ex Cham. & Schltdl. = Sipanea Aubl.
- Ptychostigma Hochst. = Galiniera Delile
- Pubeta L. = Duroia L.f.
- **Pubistylus** Thoth.
- **Puffia** Razafim. & B.Bremer
- Putoria Pers. = Plocama Aiton
- **Pygmaeothamnus** Robyns
- Pyragra Bremek. = Psychotria L.
- **Pyrostria** Comm. ex Juss.

== Q ==
- Quinquina Cond. ex Boehm. = Cinchona L.

== R ==
- **Rachicallis** DC.
- **Ramonadoxa** Paudyal & Delprete
- **Ramosmania** Tirveng. & Verdc.
- Ramspekia Scop. = Posoqueria Aubl.
- **Randia** Houst. ex L.
- **Raritebe** Wernham
- Ravnia Oerst. = Hillia Jacq.
- **Razafimandimbisonia** Kainul. & B.Bremer
- Readea Gillespie = Eumachia DC.
- Relbunium Benth. & Hook.f. = Galium L.
- **Remijia** DC.
- **Renistipula** Borhidi
- **Rennellia** Korth.
- Resinanthus (Borhidi) Borhidi = Stenostomum C.F.Gaertn.
- Restiaria Lour. = Uncaria Schreb.
- **Retiniphyllum** Bonpl.
- Reussia Dennst. = Paederia L.
- Rhabdostigma Hook.f. = Kraussia Harv.
- **Rhadinopus** S.Moore
- **Rhaphidura** Bremek.
- Rhipidantha Bremek. = Pauridiantha Hook.f.
- **Rhodopentas** Kårehed & B.Bremer
- Rhodostoma Scheidw. = Palicourea Aubl.
- Rhombospora Korth. = Greenea Wight & Arn.
- Rhopalobrachium Schltr. & K.Krause = Cyclophyllum Hook.f.
- Rhyssocarpus Endl. = Melanopsidium Colla
- **Richardia** L.
- Richardsonia Kunth = Richardia L.
- **Ridsdalea** J.T.Pereira & K.M.Wong
- **Riodocea** Delprete
- **Riqueuria** Ruiz & Pav.
- **Robbrechtia** De Block
- **Robynsia** Hutch.
- **Rogiera** Planch.
- **Roigella** Borhidi & M.Fernández
- Rojoc Adans. = Morinda L.
- **Ronabea** Aubl.
- **Rondeletia** L.
- Rosea Klotzsch = Tricalysia A.Rich.
- **Rosenbergiodendron** Fagerl.
- Rotheria Meyen = Cruckshanksia Hook. & Arn.
- **Rothmannia** Thunb.
- **Rovaeanthus** Borhidi
- Rubeola Hill = Sherardia L.
- Rubeola Mill. = Crucianella L.
- **Rubia** L.
- Rubioides Sol. ex Gaertn. = Opercularia Gaertn.
- **Rubovietnamia** Triveng.
- **Rudgea** Salisb.
- **Rustia** Klotzsch
- **Rutidea** DC.
- Rytidotus Hook.f. = Bobea Gaudich.
- **Rytigynia** Blume
- Rytigyniopsis Capuron = Rytigynia Blume

== S ==
- **Sabicea** Aubl.
- Sacconia Endl. = Chione DC.
- **Sacosperma** G.Taylor
- Sahlbergia Neck. = Gardenia J.Ellis
- Saldanha Vell. = Hillia Jacq.
- **Saldinia** A.Rich.
- **Salzmannia** DC.
- Samama Rumph. ex Kuntze = Breonia A.Rich.
- Santalina Baill. = Coptosperma Hook.f.
- Santia Wight & Arn. = Lasianthus Jack
- **Saprosma** Blume
- Sarcocephalus Afzel. ex R.Br. = Nauclea L.
- Sarcopygme Setch. & Christoph. = Morinda L.
- Sardinia Vell. = Guettarda L.
- Sarissus Gaertn. = Hydrophylax L.f.
- Scandentia E.L.Cabral & Bacigalupo = Denscantia E.L.Cabral & Bacigalupo
- Scepseothamnus Cham. = Cordiera A.Rich.
- Schachtia H.Karst. = Duroia L.f.
- Schenckia K.Schum. = Deppea Schltdl. & Cham.
- Schetti Adans. = Ixora L.
- Schiedea A.Rich. = Machaonia Bonpl.
- Schiedea Bartl. = Richardia L.
- **Schismatoclada** Baker
- Schizangium Bartl. ex DC. = Mitracarpus Zucc.
- **Schizenterospermum** Homolle ex Arènes
- **Schizocalyx** Wedd.
- **Schizocolea** Bremek.
- **Schizomussaenda** H.L.Li
- Schizospermum Boivin ex Baill. = Polysphaeria Hook.f.
- Schizostigma Arn. ex Meisn. = Sabicea Aubl.
- **Schmidtottia** Urb.
- Schoenleinia Klotzsch ex Lindl. = Bathysa C.Presl
- **Schradera** Vahl
- Schreibersia Pohl = Augusta Pohl
- **Schumanniophyton** Harms
- **Schwendenera** K.Schum.
- Schwenkfelda Schreb. = Sabicea Aubl.
- Sclerococcus Bartl. = Hedyotis L.
- **Scleromitrion** (Wight & Arn.) Meisn.
- **Scolosanthus** Vahl
- **Scyphiphora** C.F.Gaertn.
- Scyphochlamys Balf.f. = Pyrostria Comm. ex Juss.
- **Scyphostachys** Thwaites
- Sechellensia Tirveng. = Paragenipa Baill.
- Seemannia Hook. = Pentagonia Benth.
- Semaphyllanthe L.Andersson = Calycophyllum DC.
- **Sericanthe** Robbr.
- **Serissa** Comm. ex Juss.
- Sestinia Boiss. & Hohen. = Wendlandia Bartl. ex DC.
- **Seychellea** Razafim., Kainul. & Rydin
- **Shaferocharis** Urb.
- **Shaolinchiana** S.S.Ying
- **Sherardia** L.
- **Sherbournia** G.Don
- Sicelium P.Browne = Coccocypselum P.Browne
- Sickingia Willd. = Simira Aubl.
- Siderobombyx Bremek. = Xanthophytum Reinw. ex Blume
- Siderodendrum Schreb. = Ixora L.
- Sideroxyloides Jacq. = Ixora L.
- **Siemensia** Urb.
- **Simira** Aubl.
- **Singaporandia** K.M.Wong
- Sinoadina Ridsdale = Adina Salisb.
- **Sipanea** Aubl.
- **Sipaneopsis** Steyerm.
- Siphomeris Bojer = Paederia L.
- Siphonandra Turcz. = Arachnothryx Planch.
- **Siphonandrium** K.Schum.
- Siphonia Benth. = Augusta Pohl
- Solena Willd. = Posoqueria Aubl.
- **Solenandra** Hook.f.
- Solenixora Baill. = Coffea L.
- **Sommera** Schltdl.
- **Sonbridia** De Block
- Spallanzania DC. = Schismatoclada Baker
- Spathichlamys R.Parker = Greenea Wight & Arn.
- **Spermacoce** L.
- Spermacoceodes Kuntze = Spermacoce L.
- **Spermadictyon** Roxb.
- Sphaerophora Blume = Gynochthodes Blume
- **Sphinctanthus** Benth.
- Spicillaria A.Rich. = Hypobathrum Blume
- Spiradiclis Blume = Ophiorrhiza L.
- **Spirea** Pierre
- Sprucea Benth. = Simira Aubl.
- **Squamellaria** Becc.
- **Stachyarrhena** Hook.f.
- Stachyococcus Standl. = Carapichea Aubl.
- **Staelia** Cham. & Schltdl.
- **Standleya** Brade
- Stannia H.Karst. = Posoqueria Aubl.
- Staurospermum Thonn. = Mitracarpus Zucc.
- **Steenisia** Bakh.f.
- Stelechantha Bremek. = Pauridiantha Hook.f.
- Stellia Noronha = Psychotria L.
- Stelmanis Raf. = Edrastima Raf.
- Stelmotis Raf. = Edrastima Raf.
- **Stenaria** (Raf.) Terrell
- **Stenosepala** C.H.Perss.
- **Stenostomum** C.F.Gaertn.
- **Stenotis** Terrell
- Stephanium Schreb. = Palicourea Aubl.
- **Stephanococcus** Bremek.
- Stephegyne Korth. = Mitragyna Korth.
- Steudelago Kuntze = Solenandra Hook.f.
- **Stevensia** Poit.
- **Steyermarkia** Standl.
- **Stichianthus** Valeton
- Stigmanthus Lour. = Gynochthodes Blume
- **Stilpnophyllum** Hook.f.
- **Stipularia** P.Beauv.
- Stomandra Standl. = Rustia Klotzsch
- Straussia A.Gray = Psychotria L.
- **Streblosa** Korth.
- **Streblosiopsis** Valeton
- Strempelia A.Rich. = Rudgea Salisb.
- Striolaria Ducke = Pentagonia Benth.
- **Strumpfia** Jacq.
- Sturmia C.F.Gaertn. = Stenostomum C.F.Gaertn.
- Stylocoryna Cav. = Aidia Lour.
- **Stylosiphonia** Brandegee
- **Suberanthus** Borhidi & M.Fernández
- Sukunia A.C.Sm. = Atractocarpus Schltr. & K.Krause
- Sulcanux Raf. = Geophila D.Don
- Sulipa Blanco = Gardenia J.Ellis
- Sulitia Merr. = Atractocarpus Schltr. & K.Krause
- Sulzeria Roem. & Schult. = Faramea Aubl.
- Suteria DC. = Psychotria L.
- Sykesia Arn. = Gaertnera Lam.
- **Sylvainia** M.F.Romero & R.M.Salas
- Symphyllarion Gagnep. = Hedyotis L.
- **Synaptantha** Hook.f.
- Synisoon Baill. = Retiniphyllum Bonpl.
- **Syringantha** Standl.

== T ==
- **Tainus** Torr.-Montúfar, H.Ochot. & Borsch
- Talangninia Chapel. ex DC. = Hyperacanthus E.Mey. ex Bridson
- Tamatavia Hook.f. = Chapelieria A.Rich.
- **Tamilnadia** Tirveng. & Sastre
- **Tammsia** H.Karst.
- **Tamridaea** Thulin & B.Bremer
- Tangaraca Adans. = Hamelia Jacq.
- **Tangshuia** S.S.Ying
- **Tapanhuacanga** Vand.
- Tapinopentas Bremek. = Otomeria Benth.
- Tapiphyllum Robyns = Vangueria Juss.
- Tapogomea Aubl. = Palicourea Aubl.
- Tardavel Adans. = Hexasepalum Bartl. ex DC.
- **Tarenna** Gaertn.
- **Tarennella** De Block
- **Tarennoidea** Tirveng. & Sastre
- Tatea Seem. = Thiollierea Montrouz.
- Teinosolen Hook.f. = Arcytophyllum Willd. ex Schult. & Schult.f.
- Telanonia Bremek. = Palicourea Aubl.
- **Temnocalyx** Robyns
- **Temnopteryx** Hook.f.
- **Tennantia** Verdc.
- Tepesia C.F.Gaertn. = Bothriospora Hook.f.
- Terebraria Sessé ex Kuntze = Stenostomum C.F.Gaertn.
- Terrellianthus Borhidi = Arcytophyllum Willd. ex Schult. & Schult.f.
- Tertrea DC. = Machaonia Bonpl.
- **Tessiera** DC.
- Tetralopha Hook.f. = Gynochthodes Blume
- Tetramerium C.F.Gaertn. = Faramea Aubl.
- Tetraplasia Rehder = Damnacanthus C.F.Gaertn.
- Tetrastigma K.Schum. = Schumanniophyton Harms
- **Thaigardenia** Sungkaew, Teerawat., Chamch. & K.M.Wong
- **Thamnoldenlandia** Groeninckx
- Thecagonum Babu = Leptopetalum Hook. & Arn.
- Thecorchus Bremek. = Oldenlandia L.
- **Theligonum** L.
- Theyodis A.Rich. = Oldenlandia L.
- Thieleodoxa Cham. = Cordiera A.Rich.
- Thiersia Baill. = Faramea Aubl.
- **Thiollierea** Montrouz.
- **Thliphthisa** (Griseb.) P.Caputo & Del Guacchio
- **Thogsennia** Aiello
- Thouarsiora Homolle ex Arènes = Ixora L.
- Thunbergia Montin = Gardenia J.Ellis
- Thyridocalyx Bremek. = Triainolepis Hook.f.
- Thysanospermum Champ. ex Benth. = Coptosapelta Korth.
- **Timonius** Rumph. ex DC.
- **Tinadendron** Achille
- **Tobagoa** Urb.
- **Tocoyena** Aubl.
- Tontanea Aubl. = Coccocypselum P.Browne
- **Tortuella** Urb.
- **Tournefortiopsis** Rusby
- **Trailliaedoxa** W.W.Sm. & Forrest
- Tresanthera H.Karst. = Rustia Klotzsch
- Trevirania Heynh. = Psychotria L.
- **Triainolepis** Hook.f.
- Tribrachya Korth. = Rennellia Korth.
- **Tricalysia** A.Rich.
- Trichogalium Fourr. = Galium L.
- **Trichostachys** Hook.f.
- **Triflorensia** S.T.Reynolds
- Trigonopyren Bremek. = Psychotria L.
- Triodon DC. = Galianthe Griseb.
- Trisciadia Hook.f. = Coelospermum Blume
- **Tromlyca** Borhidi
- Trukia Kaneh. = Atractocarpus Schltr. & K.Krause
- Tsiangia But, H.H.Hsue & P.T.Li = Ixora L.
- **Tulearia** De Block

== U ==
- Ucriana Willd. = Tocoyena Aubl.
- **Uncaria** Schreb.
- Uncariopsis H.Karst. = Schradera Vahl
- Uncinaria Rchb. = Uncaria Schreb.
- Uragoga Baill. = Psychotria L.
- Urceolaria Willd. ex Cothen. = Schradera Vahl
- **Urophyllum** Wall.

== V ==
- **Valantia** L.
- Vanessa Raf. = Manettia Mutis
- **Vangueria** Juss.
- **Vangueriella** Verdc.
- **Vangueriopsis** Robyns
- Vavanga Rohr = Vangueria Juss.
- Versteegia Valeton = Ixora L.
- Verulamia DC. ex Poir. = Pavetta L.
- **Vidalasia** Tirveng.
- Vignaldia A.Rich. = Pentas Benth.
- **Villaria** Rolfe
- Virecta Afzel. ex Sm. = Virectaria Bremek.
- Virecta L.f. = Sipanea Aubl.
- **Virectaria** Bremek.
- Viscoides Jacq. = Notopleura (Hook.f.) Bremek.
- Vissadali Adans. = Knoxia L.
- Viviania Colla = Melanopsidium Colla
- Viviania Raf. = Stenostomum C.F.Gaertn.
- Voigtia Klotzsch = Bathysa C.Presl

== W ==
- Wahlenbergia Blume = Tarenna Gaertn.
- Wallichia Reinw. ex Blume = Urophyllum Wall.
- Wandersong David W.Taylor = Colleteria David W.Taylor
- Warburgina Eig = Callipeltis Steven
- Warneria L. = Gardenia J.Ellis
- **Warszewiczia** Klotzsch
- Watsonamra Kuntze = Pentagonia Benth.
- Webera Cramer = Canthium Lam.
- Webera Schreb. = Tarenna Gaertn.
- **Wendlandia** Bartl. ex DC.
- Wernhamia S.Moore = Simira Aubl.
- Wiasemskya Klotzsch = Tammsia H.Karst.
- Wiegmannia Meyen = Kadua Cham. & Schltdl.
- Willdenovia J.F.Gmel. = Posoqueria Aubl.
- Williamsia Merr. = Praravinia Korth.
- **Wittmackanthus** Kuntze
- Wittmannia Vahl = Vangueria Juss.

== X ==
- Xanthocodon Baill. = Psychotria L.
- Xanthophytopsis Pit. = Xanthophytum Reinw. ex Blume
- **Xanthophytum** Reinw. ex Blume
- Xantonnea Pierre ex Pit. = Discospermum Dalzell
- **Xantonneopsis** Pit.
- Xerococcus Oerst. = Hoffmannia Sw.
- Xeromphis Raf. = Catunaregam Wolf

== Y ==
- Yangapa Raf. = Gardenia J.Ellis
- Yutajea Steyerm. = Isertia Schreb.

== Z ==
- Zaluzania Comm. ex C.F.Gaertn. = Bertiera Aubl.
- Zamaria Raf. = Rondeletia L.
- Zeuxanthe Ridl. = Prismatomeris Thwaites
- **Zuccarinia** Blume
- Zuccarinia Spreng. = Jackiopsis Ridsdale
- Zwaardekronia Korth. = Chassalia Comm. ex Poir.
- Zygoon Hiern = Coptosperma Hook.f.
