= Pachystylus =

Pachystylus may refer to:

- Pachystylus (beetle), a genus of beetles in the family Curculionidae
- Pachystylus (plant), a genus of plants in the family Rubiaceae
- Pachystylus, a genus of beetles in the family Chrysomelidae, synonym of Pachybrachis
- Pachystylus, a fossil genus of gastropods in the family Cryptaulacidae, synonym of Laevibaculus
