= Stenotis =

Stenotis may refer to:

- Stenotis (insect), a genus of beetles in the family Curculionidae
- Stenotis (plant), a genus of flowering plants in the family Rubiaceae
- Stenotis (gastropod), a genus of mollusks in the family Vanikoridae, unknown status, described in 1863 by Adams
