= Sacosperma =

Scientific classification
- Kingdom: Plantae
- Clade: Tracheophytes
- Clade: Angiosperms
- Clade: Eudicots
- Clade: Asterids
- Order: Gentianales
- Family: Rubiaceae
- Genus: Sacosperma; G.Taylor

Genus of plants

Sacosperma is a genus of flowering plants belonging to the family Rubiaceae.

Its native range is Western Tropical Africa to Angola.

== Species ==
Species:

- Sacosperma paniculatum (Benth.) G.Taylor
- Sacosperma parviflorum (Benth.) G.Taylor
