= Habroneuron =

Scientific classification
- Kingdom: Plantae
- Clade: Tracheophytes
- Clade: Angiosperms
- Clade: Eudicots
- Clade: Asterids
- Order: Gentianales
- Family: Rubiaceae
- Genus: Habroneuron; Standl.

Genus of plants

Habroneuron is a genus of flowering plants belonging to the family Rubiaceae.

Its native range is Southwestern Mexico.

Species:

- Habroneuron radicans (Wernham) S.P.Darwin
