= Nodocarpaea =

Scientific classification
- Kingdom: Plantae
- Clade: Tracheophytes
- Clade: Angiosperms
- Clade: Eudicots
- Clade: Asterids
- Order: Gentianales
- Family: Rubiaceae
- Genus: Nodocarpaea; A.Gray
- Species: N. radicans

Binomial name
- Nodocarpaea radicans (Griseb.) A.Gray

Synonyms
- Nothocarpus Post & Kuntze; Borreria radicans Griseb.; Nodocarpaea radicans f. hirta A.Gray

Genus of plants

Nodocarpaea is a genus of flowering plants belonging to the family Rubiaceae. It contains a single species, Nodocarpaea radicans, a subshrub endemic to Cuba.
