= Chaetostachydium =

Scientific classification
- Kingdom: Plantae
- Clade: Tracheophytes
- Clade: Angiosperms
- Clade: Eudicots
- Clade: Asterids
- Order: Gentianales
- Family: Rubiaceae
- Genus: Chaetostachydium; Airy Shaw

Type species
- Chaetostachydium versteegii (Valeton) Airy Shaw

Synonyms
- Chaetostachys Valeton

Genus of plants

Chaetostachydium is a genus of flowering plants in the family Rubiaceae. It is endemic to New Guinea.

== Species ==
- Chaetostachydium barbatum Ridsdale
- Chaetostachydium filiforme Ridsdale
- Chaetostachydium versteegii (Valeton) Airy Shaw
