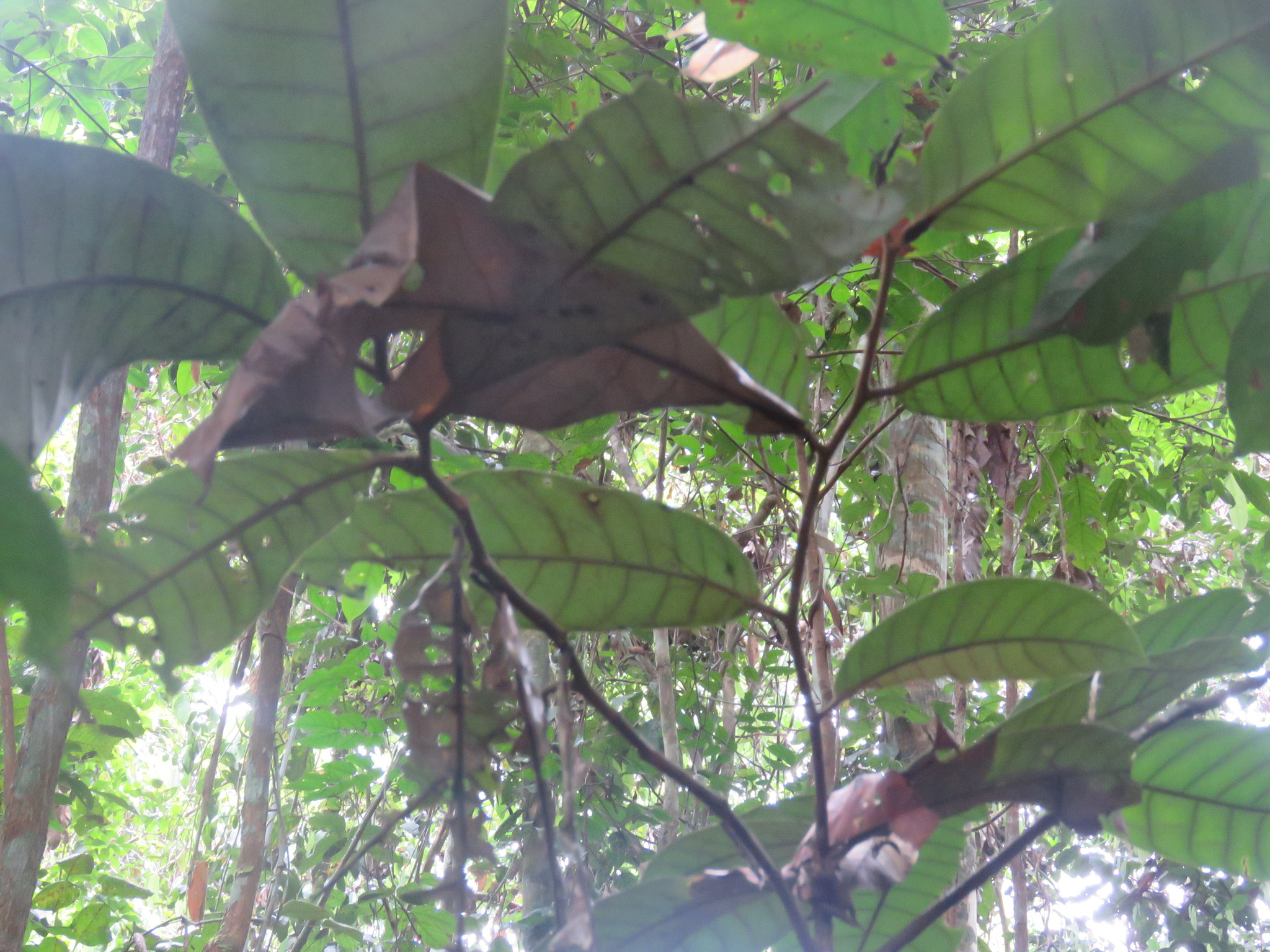

Scientific classification
- Kingdom: Plantae
- Clade: Tracheophytes
- Clade: Angiosperms
- Clade: Eudicots
- Clade: Asterids
- Order: Gentianales
- Family: Rubiaceae
- Genus: Adolphoduckea; Paudyal & Delprete (2018)
- Species: A. maynensis

Binomial name
- Adolphoduckea maynensis (Poepp. & Endl.) Paudyal & Delprete (2018)

Synonyms
- Cinchona maynensis (Poepp.) Brign. (1862); Exostema maynense Poepp. (1841)

= Adolphoduckea =

Genus of flowering plants

Adolphoduckea maynensis is a species of flowering plant belonging to the family Rubiaceae. It is a tree native to tropical South America, including Colombia, Ecuador, Peru, Bolivia, and Northern Brazil. It is the sole species in genus Adolphoduckea.

Its name is honour to brazilian botanist Adolpho Ducke.
