= Chewlunia =

Scientific classification
- Kingdom: Plantae
- Clade: Tracheophytes
- Clade: Angiosperms
- Clade: Eudicots
- Clade: Asterids
- Order: Gentianales
- Family: Rubiaceae
- Genus: Chewlunia; Junhao Chen, P.K.Hoo & K.M.Wong

Genus of flowering plants

Chewlunia is a genus of flowering plants in the family Rubiaceae. It includes eight species native to the Philippines and northern Borneo (Sabah).

== Species ==
Eight species are accepted.

- Chewlunia auriculata (Merr.) P.K.Hoo & Junhao Chen – Philippines (Dinagat Islands)
- Chewlunia hirsuta (Elmer) P.K.Hoo & Junhao Chen – Philippines
- Chewlunia longiflora (Merr.) P.K.Hoo & Junhao Chen – Philippines
- Chewlunia oligophlebia (Merr.) P.K.Hoo & Junhao Chen – Philippines (Luzon)
- Chewlunia rotunda (Merr.) P.K.Hoo & Junhao Chen – Philippines (Dinagat Islands)
- Chewlunia sabahensis P.K.Hoo & Junhao Chen – Borneo (Sabah)
- Chewlunia samarensis (Merr.) P.K.Hoo & Junhao Chen – Philippines
- Chewlunia urdanetensis (Elmer) P.K.Hoo & Junhao Chen – Philippines (Mindanao)
