= Ditrichanthus =

Scientific classification
- Kingdom: Plantae
- Clade: Tracheophytes
- Clade: Angiosperms
- Clade: Eudicots
- Clade: Asterids
- Order: Gentianales
- Family: Rubiaceae
- Genus: Ditrichanthus; Borhidi, E.Martínez & Ramos

Genus of plants

Ditrichanthus is a genus of flowering plants belonging to the family Rubiaceae.

Its native range is Southeastern Nicaragua to Ecuador.

Species:

- Ditrichanthus seemannii (Standl.) Borhidi, E.Martínez & Ramos
