= Stichianthus =

Scientific classification
- Kingdom: Plantae
- Clade: Tracheophytes
- Clade: Angiosperms
- Clade: Eudicots
- Clade: Asterids
- Order: Gentianales
- Family: Rubiaceae
- Genus: Stichianthus; Valeton
- Species: S. minutiflorus

Binomial name
- Stichianthus minutiflorus Valeton

Genus of plants

Stichianthus is a monotypic genus of flowering plants belonging to the family Rubiaceae. The only species is Stichianthus minutiflorus.

Its native range is Borneo.
