= Dolichometra =

Scientific classification
- Kingdom: Plantae
- Clade: Tracheophytes
- Clade: Angiosperms
- Clade: Eudicots
- Clade: Asterids
- Order: Gentianales
- Family: Rubiaceae
- Genus: Dolichometra; K.Schum.
- Species: D. leucantha

Binomial name
- Dolichometra leucantha K.Schum.

Genus of flowering plants

Dolichometra is a monotypic genus of flowering plants in the family Rubiaceae. The genus contains only one species, viz. Dolichometra leucantha, which is endemic to the East Usambara Mountains in Tanzania.
