= Maschalodesme =

Scientific classification
- Kingdom: Plantae
- Clade: Tracheophytes
- Clade: Angiosperms
- Clade: Eudicots
- Clade: Asterids
- Order: Gentianales
- Family: Rubiaceae
- Genus: Maschalodesme; K.Schum. & Lauterb.

Genus of plants

Maschalodesme is a genus of flowering plants belonging to the family Rubiaceae.

Its native range is New Guinea.

Species:

- Maschalodesme arborea K.Schum. & Lauterb.
- Maschalodesme versteegii (Valeton) Ridsdale
