= Paralasianthus =

Scientific classification
- Kingdom: Plantae
- Clade: Tracheophytes
- Clade: Angiosperms
- Clade: Eudicots
- Clade: Asterids
- Order: Gentianales
- Family: Rubiaceae
- Genus: Paralasianthus; H.Zhu

Genus of plants

Paralasianthus is a genus of flowering plants belonging to the family Rubiaceae.

Its native range is Hainan, Thailand to Papuasia.

Species:

- Paralasianthus dichotomus (Korth.) H.Zhu
- Paralasianthus hainanensis (Merr.) H.Zhu
- Paralasianthus lowianus (King & Gamble) H.Zhu
- Paralasianthus zhengyianus H.Zhu
