= Schizenterospermum =

Scientific classification
- Kingdom: Plantae
- Clade: Tracheophytes
- Clade: Angiosperms
- Clade: Eudicots
- Clade: Asterids
- Order: Gentianales
- Family: Rubiaceae
- Genus: Schizenterospermum; Homolle ex Arènes

Genus of plants

Schizenterospermum is a genus of flowering plants belonging to the family Rubiaceae.

Its native range is Madagascar.

Species:

- Schizenterospermum analamerense Arènes
- Schizenterospermum grevei Homolle ex Arènes
- Schizenterospermum majungense Homolle ex Arènes
- Schizenterospermum rotundifolium Homolle ex Arènes
