= Hyptianthera =

Scientific classification
- Kingdom: Plantae
- Clade: Tracheophytes
- Clade: Angiosperms
- Clade: Eudicots
- Clade: Asterids
- Order: Gentianales
- Family: Rubiaceae
- Genus: Hyptianthera; Wight & Arn.

Genus of plants

Hyptianthera is a genus of flowering plants belonging to the family Rubiaceae.

Its native range is Himalaya to Southern Central China and Indo-China.

Species:

- Hyptianthera stricta (Roxb. ex Schult.) Wight & Arn.
