= Homollea =

Scientific classification
- Kingdom: Plantae
- Clade: Tracheophytes
- Clade: Angiosperms
- Clade: Eudicots
- Clade: Asterids
- Order: Gentianales
- Family: Rubiaceae
- Genus: Homollea; Arènes

Genus of plants

Homollea is a genus of flowering plants belonging to the family Rubiaceae.

It is native to Madagascar.

The genus name of Homollea is in honour of Anne-Marie Homolle (1905–1988), a French botanist who studied and collected plants of Madagascar, and it was first described and published in Notul. Syst. (Paris) Vol.16 on page 13 in 1960.

Known species, according to Kew:

- Homollea furtiva De Block
- Homollea leandrii Arènes
- Homollea longiflora Arènes
- Homollea perrieri Arènes
- Homollea septentrionalis De Block
