= Neohymenopogon =

Scientific classification
- Kingdom: Plantae
- Clade: Tracheophytes
- Clade: Angiosperms
- Clade: Eudicots
- Clade: Asterids
- Order: Gentianales
- Family: Rubiaceae
- Genus: Neohymenopogon; Bennet

Genus of plants

Neohymenopogon is a genus of flowering plants belonging to the family Rubiaceae.

Its native range is Central Himalayas to Southern Central China and Northern Indo-China.

== Species ==
Species:

- Neohymenopogon assamicus (Hook.f.) Bennet
- Neohymenopogon oligocarpus (H.L.Li) Bennet
- Neohymenopogon parasiticus (Wall.) Bennet
