= Myrmeconauclea =

Scientific classification
- Kingdom: Plantae
- Clade: Tracheophytes
- Clade: Angiosperms
- Clade: Eudicots
- Clade: Asterids
- Order: Gentianales
- Family: Rubiaceae
- Genus: Myrmeconauclea; Merr.

Genus of plants

Myrmeconauclea is a genus of flowering plants belonging to the family Rubiaceae.

Its native range is Malesia.

== Species ==
Species:

- Myrmeconauclea rheophila (Steenis) Ridsdale
- Myrmeconauclea stipulacea Ridsdale
- Myrmeconauclea strigosa (Korth.) Merr.
- Myrmeconauclea surianii Ridsdale
