= Mantalania =

Scientific classification
- Kingdom: Plantae
- Clade: Tracheophytes
- Clade: Angiosperms
- Clade: Eudicots
- Clade: Asterids
- Order: Gentianales
- Family: Rubiaceae
- Genus: Mantalania; Capuron ex J.-F.Leroy

Genus of plants

Mantalania is a genus of flowering plants belonging to the family Rubiaceae.

Its native range is Madagascar.

Species:

- Mantalania capuronii J.-F.Leroy
- Mantalania longipedunculata De Block & A.P.Davis
- Mantalania sambiranensis Capuron ex J.-F.Leroy
