= Etericius =

Scientific classification
- Kingdom: Plantae
- Clade: Tracheophytes
- Clade: Angiosperms
- Clade: Eudicots
- Clade: Asterids
- Order: Gentianales
- Family: Rubiaceae
- Genus: Etericius; Desv. ex Ham.
- Species: E. parasiticus

Binomial name
- Etericius parasiticus Desv. ex Ham.

Genus of plants

Etericius is a monotypic genus of flowering plants in the family Rubiaceae. The genus contains only one species, viz. Etericius parasiticus, which is endemic to Guyana.
