= Fergusonia =

Scientific classification
- Kingdom: Plantae
- Clade: Tracheophytes
- Clade: Angiosperms
- Clade: Eudicots
- Clade: Asterids
- Order: Gentianales
- Family: Rubiaceae
- Genus: Fergusonia; Hook.f.
- Species: F. zeylanica

Binomial name
- Fergusonia zeylanica Hook.f.

Synonyms
- Borreria tetracocca Thwaites; Fergusonia thwaitesii Hook.f.; Fergusonia tetracocca (Thwaites) Baill.

Genus of plants

Fergusonia is a monotypic genus of flowering plants in the family Rubiaceae. The genus contains only one species, viz. Fergusonia zeylanica, which is only found in southern India and western Sri Lanka.
