= Diacrodon =

Scientific classification
- Kingdom: Plantae
- Clade: Tracheophytes
- Clade: Angiosperms
- Clade: Eudicots
- Clade: Asterids
- Order: Gentianales
- Family: Rubiaceae
- Genus: Diacrodon; Sprague
- Species: D. compressus

Binomial name
- Diacrodon compressus Sprague

Genus of plants

Diacrodon is a monotypic genus of flowering plants in the family Rubiaceae. The genus contains only one species, viz. Diacrodon compressus, which is endemic to northeastern Brazil.
