= Lecananthus =

Scientific classification
- Kingdom: Plantae
- Clade: Tracheophytes
- Clade: Angiosperms
- Clade: Eudicots
- Clade: Asterids
- Order: Gentianales
- Family: Rubiaceae
- Genus: Lecananthus; Jack

Genus of plants

Lecananthus is a genus of flowering plants belonging to the family Rubiaceae.

Its native range is Western Malesia.

Species:

- Lecananthus erubescens Jack
- Lecananthus peduncularis Puff
- Lecananthus pentander (Merr.) Puff
