= Pagameopsis =

Scientific classification
- Kingdom: Plantae
- Clade: Tracheophytes
- Clade: Angiosperms
- Clade: Eudicots
- Clade: Asterids
- Order: Gentianales
- Family: Rubiaceae
- Genus: Pagameopsis; Steyerm.

Genus of plants

Pagameopsis is a genus of flowering plants belonging to the family Rubiaceae.

Its native range is Southern Venezuela to Northern Brazil.

Species:

- Pagameopsis garryoides (Standl.) Steyerm.
- Pagameopsis maguirei Steyerm.
