= Pseudodiplospora =

Scientific classification
- Kingdom: Plantae
- Clade: Tracheophytes
- Clade: Angiosperms
- Clade: Eudicots
- Clade: Asterids
- Order: Gentianales
- Family: Rubiaceae
- Genus: Pseudodiplospora; Deb
- Species: P. andamanica

Binomial name
- Pseudodiplospora andamanica (N.P.Balakr. & N.G.Nair) Deb

Synonyms
- Diplospora andamanica N.P.Balakr. & N.G.Nair

Genus of plants

Pseudodiplospora is a genus of flowering plants belonging to the family Rubiaceae. It includes a single species, Pseudodiplospora andamanica, a shrub endemic to Saddle Peak in the north Andaman Islands.
