= Pseudogalium =

Scientific classification
- Kingdom: Plantae
- Clade: Tracheophytes
- Clade: Angiosperms
- Clade: Eudicots
- Clade: Asterids
- Order: Gentianales
- Family: Rubiaceae
- Genus: Pseudogalium; L.E Yang, Z.L.Nie & H.Sun
- Species: P. paradoxum

Binomial name
- Pseudogalium paradoxum (Maxim.) L.E Yang, Z.L.Nie & H.Sun

Genus of angiosperm

Pseudogalium is a monotypic genus of flowering plants belonging to the family Rubiaceae. The only species is Pseudogalium paradoxum.

Its native range is Eastern Europe to Temperate Asia.
