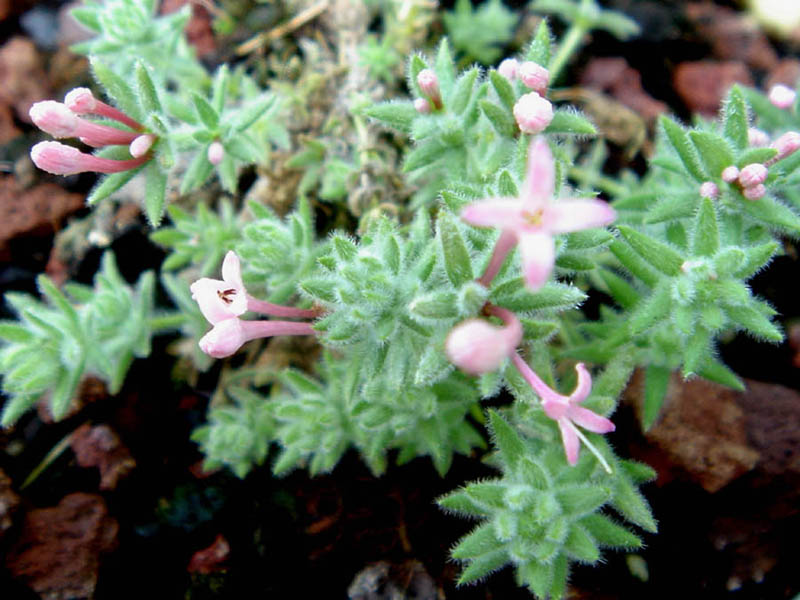
- Asperula suberosa

Scientific classification
- Kingdom: Plantae
- Clade: Tracheophytes
- Clade: Angiosperms
- Clade: Eudicots
- Clade: Asterids
- Order: Gentianales
- Family: Rubiaceae
- Genus: Thliphthisa (Griseb.) P.Caputo & Del Guacchio (2020)

Species
- 22; see text

= Thliphthisa =

Genus of plants

Thliphthisa is a genus of flowering plants in the family Rubiaceae. It includes 22 species which range from southern Europe (France and Italy to the Alps and Balkan Peninsula) to Turkey, Cyprus, Syria, and Iran.

- Thliphthisa antalyensis (Ehrend.) P.Caputo & Del Guacchio
- Thliphthisa apuana (Fiori) P.Caputo & Del Guacchio
- Thliphthisa baenitzii (Heldr. ex Boiss.) P.Caputo & Del Guacchio
- Thliphthisa baldaccii (Halácsy) P.Caputo & Del Guacchio
- Thliphthisa brevifolia (Vent.) P.Caputo & Del Guacchio
- Thliphthisa chlorantha (Boiss. & Heldr.) P.Caputo & Del Guacchio
- Thliphthisa crassula (Greuter & Zaffran) P.Caputo & Del Guacchio
- Thliphthisa elonea (Iatroú & T.Georgiadis) P.Caputo & Del Guacchio
- Thliphthisa gorganica (Schönb.-Tem. & Ehrend.) P.Caputo & Del Guacchio
- Thliphthisa mazanderanica (Ehrend.) P.Caputo & Del Guacchio
- Thliphthisa microphylla (Boiss.) P.Caputo & Del Guacchio
- Thliphthisa muscosa (Boiss. & Heldr.) P.Caputo & Del Guacchio
- Thliphthisa pseudochlorantha (Ehrend.) P.Caputo & Del Guacchio
- Thliphthisa purpurea (L.) P.Caputo & Del Guacchio
- Thliphthisa pusilla (Bory & Chaub.) J.Krieg., Del Guacchio & P.Caputo
- Thliphthisa rigida (Sm.) P.Caputo & Del Guacchio
- Thliphthisa rupestris (Vis.) P.Caputo & Del Guacchio
- Thliphthisa saxicola (Ehrend.) P.Caputo & Del Guacchio
- Thliphthisa semanensis (Schönb.-Tem. & Ehrend.) P.Caputo & Del Guacchio
- Thliphthisa serotina (Boiss. & Heldr.) P.Caputo & Del Guacchio
- Thliphthisa suberosa (Sm.) P.Caputo & Del Guacchio
- Thliphthisa tournefortii (Sieber) P.Caputo & Del Guacchio
