= Melanoxerus =

Scientific classification
- Kingdom: Plantae
- Clade: Tracheophytes
- Clade: Angiosperms
- Clade: Eudicots
- Clade: Asterids
- Order: Gentianales
- Family: Rubiaceae
- Genus: Melanoxerus; Kainul. & B.Bremer

Genus of plants

Melanoxerus is a genus of flowering plants belonging to the family Rubiaceae.

Its native range is Madagascar.

Species:

- Melanoxerus suavissimus (Homolle ex Cavaco) Kainul. & B.Bremer
