= Tobagoa =

Scientific classification
- Kingdom: Plantae
- Clade: Tracheophytes
- Clade: Angiosperms
- Clade: Eudicots
- Clade: Asterids
- Order: Gentianales
- Family: Rubiaceae
- Genus: Tobagoa; Urb.

Genus of plants

Tobagoa is a genus of flowering plants belonging to the family Rubiaceae.

Its native range is Panama to Tobago.

Species:

- Tobagoa maleolens Urb.
- Tobagoa perijaensis (Steyerm.) R.M.Salas & E.L.Cabral
