= Syringantha =

Scientific classification
- Kingdom: Plantae
- Clade: Tracheophytes
- Clade: Angiosperms
- Clade: Eudicots
- Clade: Asterids
- Order: Gentianales
- Family: Rubiaceae
- Genus: Syringantha; Standl.

Genus of plants

Syringantha is a genus of flowering plants belonging to the family Rubiaceae.

Its native range is Northeastern Mexico.

Species:

- Syringantha coulteri (Hook.f.) T.McDowell
