= Coutareopsis =

Scientific classification
- Kingdom: Plantae
- Clade: Tracheophytes
- Clade: Angiosperms
- Clade: Eudicots
- Clade: Asterids
- Order: Gentianales
- Family: Rubiaceae
- Genus: Coutareopsis; Paudyal & Delprete

Genus of plants

Coutareopsis is a genus of flowering plants belonging to the family Rubiaceae.

Its native range is Ecuador to Peru.

Species:

- Coutareopsis andrei (Standl.) Paudyal & Delprete
- Coutareopsis coutaportloides (C.M.Taylor) Paudyal & Delprete
- Coutareopsis fuchsioides (C.M.Taylor) Paudyal & Delprete
