= Tarennella =

Scientific classification
- Kingdom: Plantae
- Clade: Tracheophytes
- Clade: Angiosperms
- Clade: Eudicots
- Clade: Asterids
- Order: Gentianales
- Family: Rubiaceae
- Genus: Tarennella; De Block (2020)

Species
- Tarennella cordatifolia De Block; Tarennella coronata De Block; Tarennella homolleana De Block; Tarennella puberula De Block; Tarennella sanguinea De Block

Genus of flowering plants

Tarennella is a genus of flowering plants in the family Rubiaceae. It includes five species endemic to Madagascar.

- Tarennella cordatifolia De Block
- Tarennella coronata De Block
- Tarennella homolleana De Block
- Tarennella puberula De Block
- Tarennella sanguinea De Block
