= Peripeplus =

Scientific classification
- Kingdom: Plantae
- Clade: Tracheophytes
- Clade: Angiosperms
- Clade: Eudicots
- Clade: Asterids
- Order: Gentianales
- Family: Rubiaceae
- Genus: Peripeplus; Pierre

Genus of plants

Peripeplus is a genus of flowering plants belonging to the family Rubiaceae.

Its native range is Gabon.

Species:

- Peripeplus bracteosus (Hiern) E.M.A.Petit
