= Stylosiphonia =

Scientific classification
- Kingdom: Plantae
- Clade: Tracheophytes
- Clade: Angiosperms
- Clade: Eudicots
- Clade: Asterids
- Order: Gentianales
- Family: Rubiaceae
- Genus: Stylosiphonia; Brandegee
- Species: S. glabra

Binomial name
- Stylosiphonia glabra Brandegee

Genus of plants

Stylosiphonia is a monotypic genus of flowering plants belonging to the family Rubiaceae. The only species is Stylosiphonia glabra.

Its native range is Southeastern Mexico.
