= Pseudomiltemia =

Scientific classification
- Kingdom: Plantae
- Clade: Tracheophytes
- Clade: Angiosperms
- Clade: Eudicots
- Clade: Asterids
- Order: Gentianales
- Family: Rubiaceae
- Genus: Pseudomiltemia; Borhidi

Genus of plants

Pseudomiltemia is a genus of flowering plants belonging to the family Rubiaceae.

Its native range is Southern Mexico.

Species:

- Pseudomiltemia davidsonii Mart.-Camilo & Lorence
- Pseudomiltemia filisepala (Standl.) Borhidi
