= Didymochlamys =

Scientific classification
- Kingdom: Plantae
- Clade: Tracheophytes
- Clade: Angiosperms
- Clade: Eudicots
- Clade: Asterids
- Order: Gentianales
- Family: Rubiaceae
- Genus: Didymochlamys; Hook.f.

Type species
- Didymochlamys whitei Hook.f.

Genus of plants

Didymochlamys is a genus of flowering plants in the family Rubiaceae. The genus is found from Nicaragua to Guyana and Ecuador.

There are two species in the genus. They are usually epiphytes that grow on trees. The inflorescence contains 2 to 5 flowers pressed between flattened green bracts.

== Species ==
- Didymochlamys connellii N.E.Br. - Colombia, Guyana, Venezuela
- Didymochlamys whitei Hook.f. - Colombia, Ecuador, Nicaragua, Panama
