= Mitrasacmopsis =

Scientific classification
- Kingdom: Plantae
- Clade: Tracheophytes
- Clade: Angiosperms
- Clade: Eudicots
- Clade: Asterids
- Order: Gentianales
- Family: Rubiaceae
- Genus: Mitrasacmopsis; Jovet

Genus of plants

Mitrasacmopsis is a genus of flowering plants belonging to the family Rubiaceae.

Its native range is Rwanda to Southern Tropical Africa, and Madagascar.

== Species ==
Species:

- Mitrasacmopsis quadrivalvis Jovet
