= Tortuella =

Scientific classification
- Kingdom: Plantae
- Clade: Tracheophytes
- Clade: Angiosperms
- Clade: Eudicots
- Clade: Asterids
- Order: Gentianales
- Family: Rubiaceae
- Genus: Tortuella; Urb. (1927)
- Species: T. abietifolia

Binomial name
- Tortuella abietifolia Urb. & Ekman (1927)

Genus of plants

Tortuella is a genus of flowering plants belonging to the family Rubiaceae. It contains a single species, Tortuella abietifolia, a subshrub endemic to Haiti.
