= Ramonadoxa =

Scientific classification
- Kingdom: Plantae
- Clade: Tracheophytes
- Clade: Angiosperms
- Clade: Eudicots
- Clade: Asterids
- Order: Gentianales
- Family: Rubiaceae
- Genus: Ramonadoxa; Paudyal & Delprete (2018)
- Species: R. cubensis

Binomial name
- Ramonadoxa cubensis (Urb.) Paudyal & Delprete (2018)

Synonyms
- Chiococca cubensis Urb. (1923)

Genus of flowering plants

Ramonadoxa cubensis is a species of flowering plant in the family Rubiaceae. It is the sole species in genus Ramonadoxa. It is a scrambling scrub or tree endemic to eastern Cuba.
