= Flexanthera =

Scientific classification
- Kingdom: Plantae
- Clade: Tracheophytes
- Clade: Angiosperms
- Clade: Eudicots
- Clade: Asterids
- Order: Gentianales
- Family: Rubiaceae
- Genus: Flexanthera
- Species: F. subcordata

Binomial name
- Flexanthera subcordata Rusby

Genus of flowering plants

Flexanthera is a genus of plants in the family Rubiaceae. It contains only one known species, Flexanthera subcordata, endemic to Colombia.
