= Ottoschmidtia =

Scientific classification
- Kingdom: Plantae
- Clade: Tracheophytes
- Clade: Angiosperms
- Clade: Eudicots
- Clade: Asterids
- Order: Gentianales
- Family: Rubiaceae
- Genus: Ottoschmidtia; Urb.

Synonyms
- Guettarda echinodendron C.Wright; Stenostomum microphyllum Griseb.

Species of plants

Ottoschmidtia is a monotypic genus of flowering plants belonging to the family Rubiaceae. It only contains one known species, Ottoschmidtia microphylla (Griseb.) Urb.

Its native range is Caribbean, it is found in Cuba, the Dominican Republic and Haiti.

The genus name of Ottoschmidtia is in honour of Otto Christian Schmidt (1900–1951), a German botanist, professor in Berlin and Münster. He was also a specialist in algae. The Latin specific epithet of microphylla is a portmanteau word derived from 'micro-' meaning small and also 'phylla' meaning leaf. The genus was first described and published in Repert. Spec. Nov. Regni Veg. Vol.20 on page 312 in 1924. The species was published in Ark. Bot. Vol.21A (Issue 5) on page 85 in 1927.

== Subspecies ==
According to Kew.

- Ottoschmidtia microphylla subsp. haitiensis (Urb.) Borhidi, from Dominican Republic, Haiti
- Ottoschmidtia microphylla subsp. microphylla, from Cuba
