= Khasiaclunea =

Scientific classification
- Kingdom: Plantae
- Clade: Tracheophytes
- Clade: Angiosperms
- Clade: Eudicots
- Clade: Asterids
- Order: Gentianales
- Family: Rubiaceae
- Genus: Khasiaclunea
- Species: K. oligocephala

Binomial name
- Khasiaclunea oligocephala (Havil.) Ridsdale

Synonyms
- Adina oligocephala Havil

Genus of plants

Khasiaclunea is a genus of plants in the family Rubiaceae. It has only one known species, Khasiaclunea oligocephala, known from the high mountains of the Darjeeling region of India through Assam and Bhutan to Burma (Myanmar).
