= Castrila =

Scientific classification
- Kingdom: Plantae
- Clade: Tracheophytes
- Clade: Angiosperms
- Clade: Eudicots
- Clade: Asterids
- Order: Gentianales
- Family: Rubiaceae
- Subfamily: Rubioideae
- Tribe: Rubieae
- Genus: Castrila; Blanca, S.Ben-Menni, H.Blanca, Cueto, J.Fuentes, Ortega Oliv. & Suár.-Sant.
- Species: C. latens

Binomial name
- Castrila latens Blanca, S.Ben-Menni, H.Blanca, Cueto, J.Fuentes, Ortega Oliv. & Suár.-Sant.

Genus of flowering plant

Castrila is a monotypic genus of flowering plants in the Rubiaceae family described in 2024. The genus contains only one species, viz. Castrila latens, which is endemic to south-eastern Spain.
