= Pinarophyllon =

Scientific classification
- Kingdom: Plantae
- Clade: Tracheophytes
- Clade: Angiosperms
- Clade: Eudicots
- Clade: Asterids
- Order: Gentianales
- Family: Rubiaceae
- Genus: Pinarophyllon; Brandegee

Genus of plants

Pinarophyllon is a genus of flowering plants belonging to the family Rubiaceae.

Its native range is Southeastern Mexico to Guatemala.

Species:

- Pinarophyllon bullatum Standl.
- Pinarophyllon flavum Brandegee
