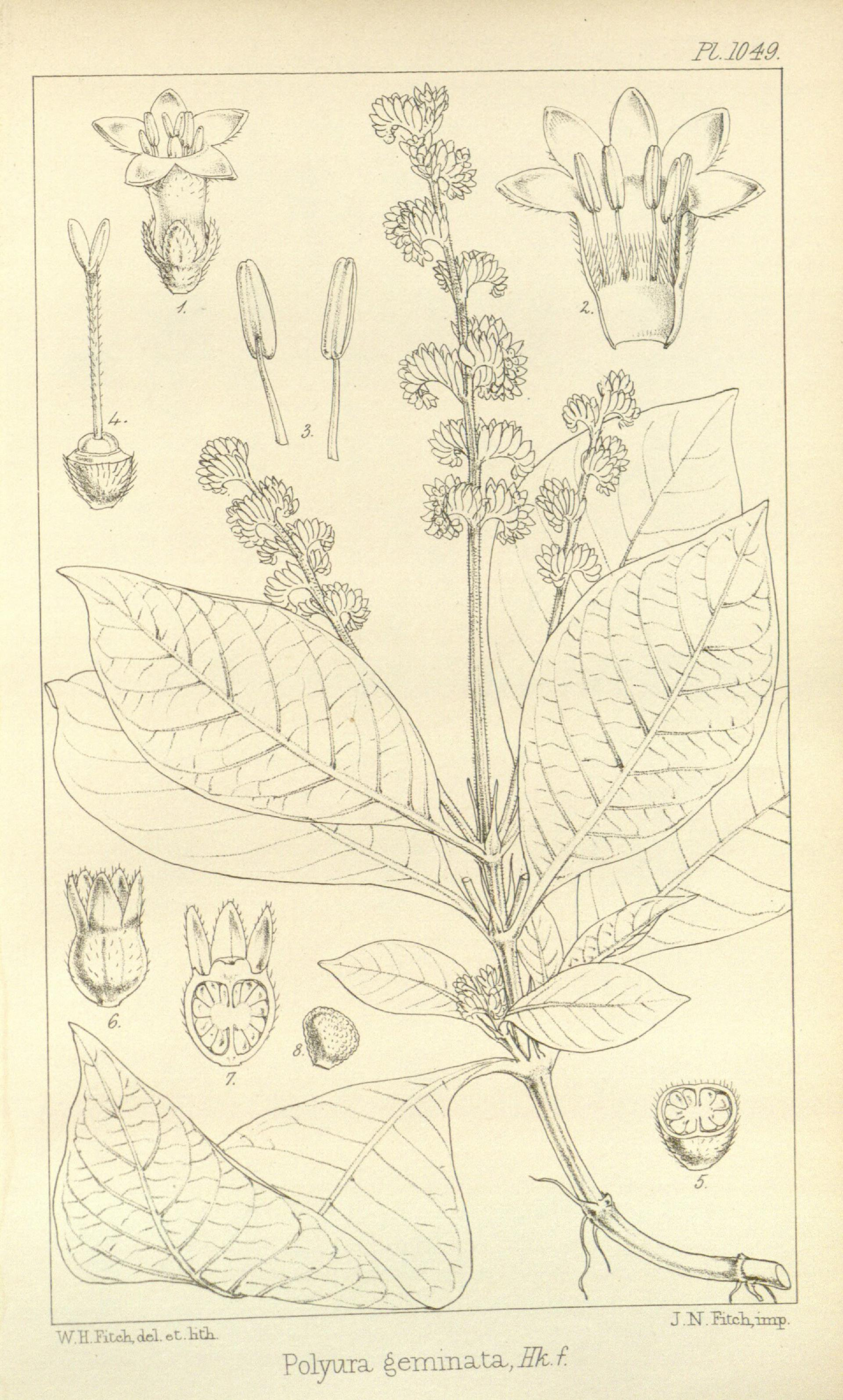

Scientific classification
- Kingdom: Plantae
- Clade: Tracheophytes
- Clade: Angiosperms
- Clade: Eudicots
- Clade: Asterids
- Order: Gentianales
- Family: Rubiaceae
- Genus: Polyura; Hook.f. (1868)
- Species: P. geminata

Binomial name
- Polyura geminata (Wall. ex G.Don) Hook.f.

Synonyms
- Ophiorrhiza geminata Wall. ex G.Don (1834)

= Polyura geminata =

Species of flowering plant

Polyura geminata is a species of flowering plant in the family Rubiaceae. It is the sole species in genus Polyura. It is a subshrub native to the eastern Himalayas, including Bhutan, Arunachal Pradesh, and Assam.
