= Lucya =

Scientific classification
- Kingdom: Plantae
- Clade: Embryophytes
- Clade: Tracheophytes
- Clade: Spermatophytes
- Clade: Angiosperms
- Clade: Eudicots
- Clade: Asterids
- Order: Gentianales
- Family: Rubiaceae
- Genus: Lucya; DC.

Synonyms
- Peplis tetrandra L.; Dunalia tetrandra (L.) Kuntze; Dunalia tuberosa (Lam.) Spreng.; Hedyotis tuberosa (Lam.) Sw.; Lucya tuberosa (Lam.) DC.; Oldenlandia tuberosa Lam.

Genus of flowering plants

Lucya is a monotypic genus of flowering plants belonging to the family Rubiaceae. It only contains one known species, 'Lucya tetrandra' (L.) K.Schum.

It is native to the Caribbean region. It is found in Cuba, Dominican Republic, Haiti, Jamaica and Puerto Rico.

The genus name of Lucya is in honour of Rose Lucie (or Lucy) Dunal (1798–1827), the sister of Michel Félix Dunal (1789–1856) who investigated Rubiaceae in Montpellier. The genus has several known synonyms; such as Clavenna Neck. ex Standl., Clavennaea Neck. ex Post & Kuntze and Dunalia Spreng.

The species Latin specific epithet of tetrandra refers to the Greek tetrandrus meaning four-anthered, the anther is the pollen-bearing part of a stamen. The genus was first described and published Prodr. Vol.4 on page 434 in 1830. and the species was first published in H.G.A.Engler & K.A.E.Prantl, Nat. Pflanzenfam. Vol.4 (Issue 4) on page 27 in 1891.
