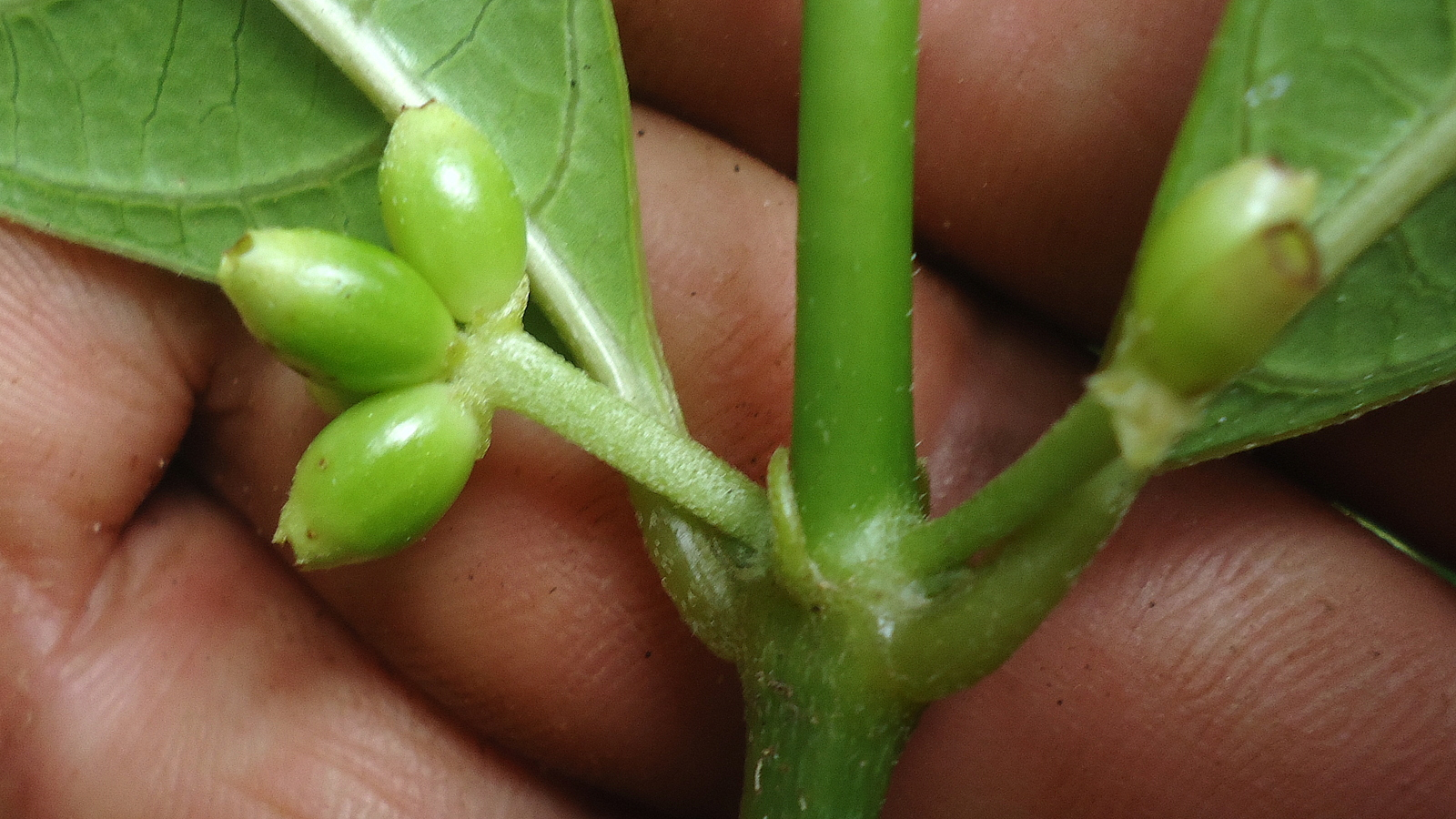
- Ronabea latifolia

Scientific classification
- Kingdom: Plantae
- Clade: Tracheophytes
- Clade: Angiosperms
- Clade: Eudicots
- Clade: Asterids
- Order: Gentianales
- Family: Rubiaceae
- Genus: Ronabea; Aubl.

= Ronabea =

Genus of plants

Ronabea is a genus of flowering plants belonging to the family Rubiaceae.

Its native range is Tropical America.

Species:

- Ronabea emetica (L.f.) A.Rich.
- Ronabea isanae (J.H.Kirkbr.) C.M.Taylor
- Ronabea latifolia Aubl.
