= Sipaneopsis =

Scientific classification
- Kingdom: Plantae
- Clade: Tracheophytes
- Clade: Angiosperms
- Clade: Eudicots
- Clade: Asterids
- Order: Gentianales
- Family: Rubiaceae
- Genus: Sipaneopsis; Steyerm.

Genus of plants

Sipaneopsis is a genus of flowering plants belonging to the family Rubiaceae.

Its native range is Colombia to Southern Venezuela and Northern Brazil.

== Species ==
Species:

- Sipaneopsis cururuensis J.H.Kirkbr.
- Sipaneopsis duckei Delprete
- Sipaneopsis foldatsii Steyerm.
- Sipaneopsis huberi Steyerm.
- Sipaneopsis maguirei Steyerm.
- Sipaneopsis morichensis Steyerm.
- Sipaneopsis pacimonensis Steyerm.
- Sipaneopsis rupicola (Spruce ex K.Schum.) Steyerm.
