= Hekistocarpa =

Scientific classification
- Kingdom: Plantae
- Clade: Tracheophytes
- Clade: Angiosperms
- Clade: Eudicots
- Clade: Asterids
- Order: Gentianales
- Family: Rubiaceae
- Genus: Hekistocarpa; Hook.f.

Genus of plants

Hekistocarpa is a genus of flowering plants belonging to the family Rubiaceae.

Its native range is Western Tropical Africa to Cameroon.

Species:

- Hekistocarpa minutiflora Hook.f.
