= Petitiocodon =

Scientific classification
- Kingdom: Plantae
- Clade: Embryophytes
- Clade: Tracheophytes
- Clade: Spermatophytes
- Clade: Angiosperms
- Clade: Eudicots
- Clade: Asterids
- Order: Gentianales
- Family: Rubiaceae
- Genus: Petitiocodon; Robbr.

Synonyms
- Didymosalpinx parviflora Keay

Species of plants

Petitiocodon is a monotypic genus of flowering plants belonging to the family Rubiaceae. It only contains one known species, Petitiocodon parviflorum (Keay) Robbr.

It is native to Nigeria and Cameroon.

The genus name of Petitiocodon is in honour of Ernest Marie Antoine Petit (1927–2007), a Belgian professor of botany and botanical garden director. Both the genus and the species were first described and published in Bull. Jard. Bot. Natl. Belg. Vol.58 on page 116–119 in 1988.
