= Paracephaelis =

Scientific classification
- Kingdom: Plantae
- Clade: Tracheophytes
- Clade: Angiosperms
- Clade: Eudicots
- Clade: Asterids
- Order: Gentianales
- Family: Rubiaceae
- Genus: Paracephaelis; Baill.

Synonyms
- Homolliella Arènes

Genus of plants

Paracephaelis is a genus of flowering plants belonging to the family Rubiaceae.

Its native range is Kenya to Mozambique and the Western Indian Ocean. It is found in Aldabra, Comoros, Kenya, Madagascar, Mozambique and Tanzania.

It is now listed as Extinct in Réunion.

== Species ==
According to Kew:

- Paracephaelis cinerea (A.Rich. ex DC.) De Block
- Paracephaelis saxatilis (Scott Elliot) De Block
- Paracephaelis sericea (Arènes) De Block
- Paracephaelis tiliacea Baill.
- Paracephaelis trichantha (Baker) De Block
