= Paranotis =

Scientific classification
- Kingdom: Plantae
- Clade: Tracheophytes
- Clade: Angiosperms
- Clade: Eudicots
- Clade: Asterids
- Order: Gentianales
- Family: Rubiaceae
- Genus: Paranotis; Pedley ex K.L.Gibbons (2020)

Species
- Paranotis halfordii K.L.Gibbons & S.J.Dillon; Paranotis kochiae (Halford) K.L.Gibbons; Paranotis mitrasacmoides (F.Muell.) K.L.Gibbons; Paranotis pterospora (F.Muell.) Pedley ex K.L.Gibbons

Genus of flowering plants

Paranotis is a genus of flowering plants in the family Rubiaceae. It includes four species endemic to northern and eastern Australia, ranging from Western Australia through the Northern Territory and Queensland to New South Wales.
