= Leucolophus =

Scientific classification
- Kingdom: Plantae
- Clade: Tracheophytes
- Clade: Angiosperms
- Clade: Eudicots
- Clade: Asterids
- Order: Gentianales
- Family: Rubiaceae
- Genus: Leucolophus; Bremek.

Genus of plants

Leucolophus is a genus of flowering plants belonging to the family Rubiaceae.

Its native range is Western Malesia.

Species:

- Leucolophus gajoensis Bremek.
- Leucolophus macranthus (Ridl.) Bremek.
- Leucolophus tobingensis (Miq.) Bremek.
