= Lamprothamnus =

Scientific classification
- Kingdom: Plantae
- Clade: Tracheophytes
- Clade: Angiosperms
- Clade: Eudicots
- Clade: Asterids
- Order: Gentianales
- Family: Rubiaceae
- Genus: Lamprothamnus; Hiern (1877)
- Species: L. zanguebaricus

Binomial name
- Lamprothamnus zanguebaricus Hiern (1877)

Genus of plants

Lamprothamnus zanguebaricus is a species of flowering plants belonging to the family Rubiaceae. It is the sole species in genus Lamprothamnus. It is a shrub or tree native to eastern Africa, ranging from southern Somalia to Kenya and Tanzania.
