= Didymopogon =

Scientific classification
- Kingdom: Plantae
- Clade: Tracheophytes
- Clade: Angiosperms
- Clade: Eudicots
- Clade: Asterids
- Order: Gentianales
- Family: Rubiaceae
- Genus: Didymopogon; Bremek.
- Species: D. sumatranum

Binomial name
- Didymopogon sumatranum (Ridl.) Bremek.

Synonyms
- Urophyllum sumatranum Ridl.

Genus of plants

Didymopogon is a monotypic genus of flowering plants in the family Rubiaceae. The genus contains only one species, viz. Didymopogon sumatranum, which is endemic to western Sumatra.
