= Thaigardenia =

Scientific classification
- Kingdom: Plantae
- Clade: Tracheophytes
- Clade: Angiosperms
- Clade: Eudicots
- Clade: Asterids
- Order: Gentianales
- Family: Rubiaceae
- Genus: Thaigardenia; Sungkaew, Teerawat., Chamch. & K.M.Wong

Genus of flowering plants

Thaigardenia is a genus of flowering plants in the family Rubiaceae. It includes three species of scrambling shrubs or trees native to Indochina (Cambodia, Laos, Thailand, and Vietnam).

== Species ==
Three species are accepted.

- Thaigardenia cambodiana (Pit.) K.M.Wong & Chamch. – Cambodia, Laos, and Vietnam
- Thaigardenia collinsiae (Craib) K.M.Wong, Teerawat. & Sungkaew – Thailand
- Thaigardenia similis (Craib) K.M.Wong & L.Neo – Thailand
