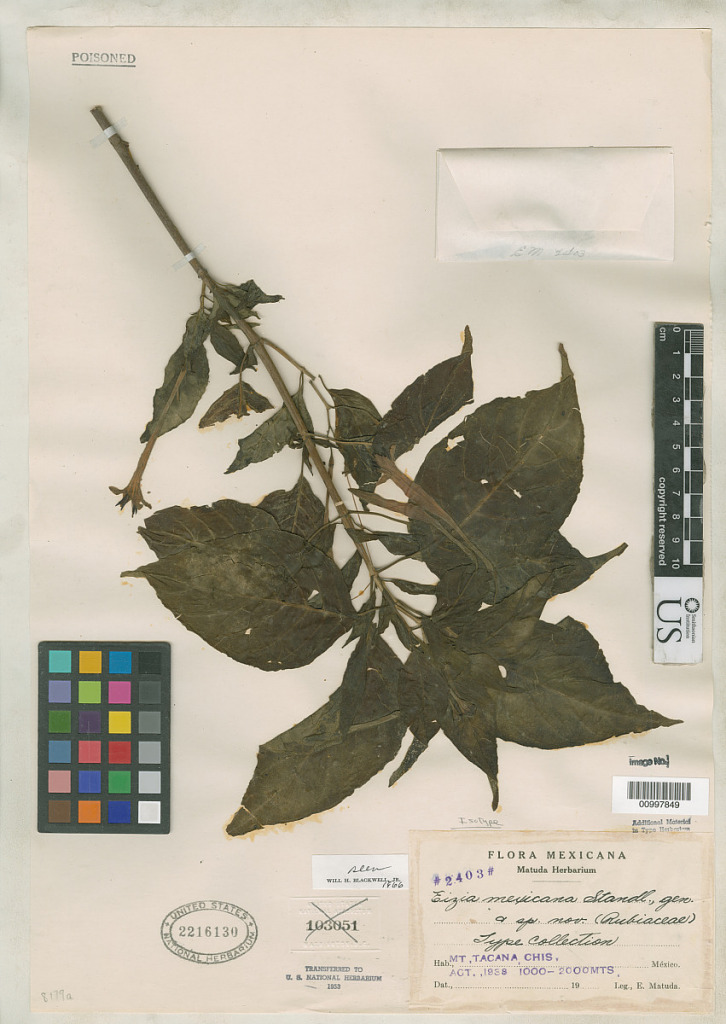

Scientific classification
- Kingdom: Plantae
- Clade: Tracheophytes
- Clade: Angiosperms
- Clade: Eudicots
- Clade: Asterids
- Order: Gentianales
- Family: Rubiaceae
- Genus: Eizia; Standl.
- Species: E. mexicana

Binomial name
- Eizia mexicana Standl.

= Eizia =

Genus of plants

Eizia is a monotypic genus of flowering plants in the family Rubiaceae. The genus contains only one species, viz. Eizia mexicana, which is found in Chiapas and Guatemala.
