= Diyaminauclea =

Scientific classification
- Kingdom: Plantae
- Clade: Tracheophytes
- Clade: Angiosperms
- Clade: Eudicots
- Clade: Asterids
- Order: Gentianales
- Family: Rubiaceae
- Genus: Diyaminauclea; Ridsdale
- Species: D. zeylanica

Binomial name
- Diyaminauclea zeylanica (Hook.f.) Ridsdale

Synonyms
- Bancalus zeylanicus (Hook.f.) Kuntze; Nauclea peduncularis Thwaites; Nauclea triflora Moon; Nauclea zeylanica Hook.f.; Neonauclea zeylanica (Hook.f.) Merr.

Genus of flowering plants

Diyaminauclea is a monotypic genus of flowering plants in the family Rubiaceae. The genus contains only one species, viz. Diyaminauclea zeylanica, which is endemic to Sri Lanka.
