= Pubistylus =

Scientific classification
- Kingdom: Plantae
- Clade: Tracheophytes
- Clade: Angiosperms
- Clade: Eudicots
- Clade: Asterids
- Order: Gentianales
- Family: Rubiaceae
- Genus: Pubistylus; Thoth.

Genus of plants

Pubistylus is a genus of flowering plants belonging to the family Rubiaceae.

Its native range is Andaman and Nicobar Islands.

Species:

- Pubistylus andamanensis Thoth.
