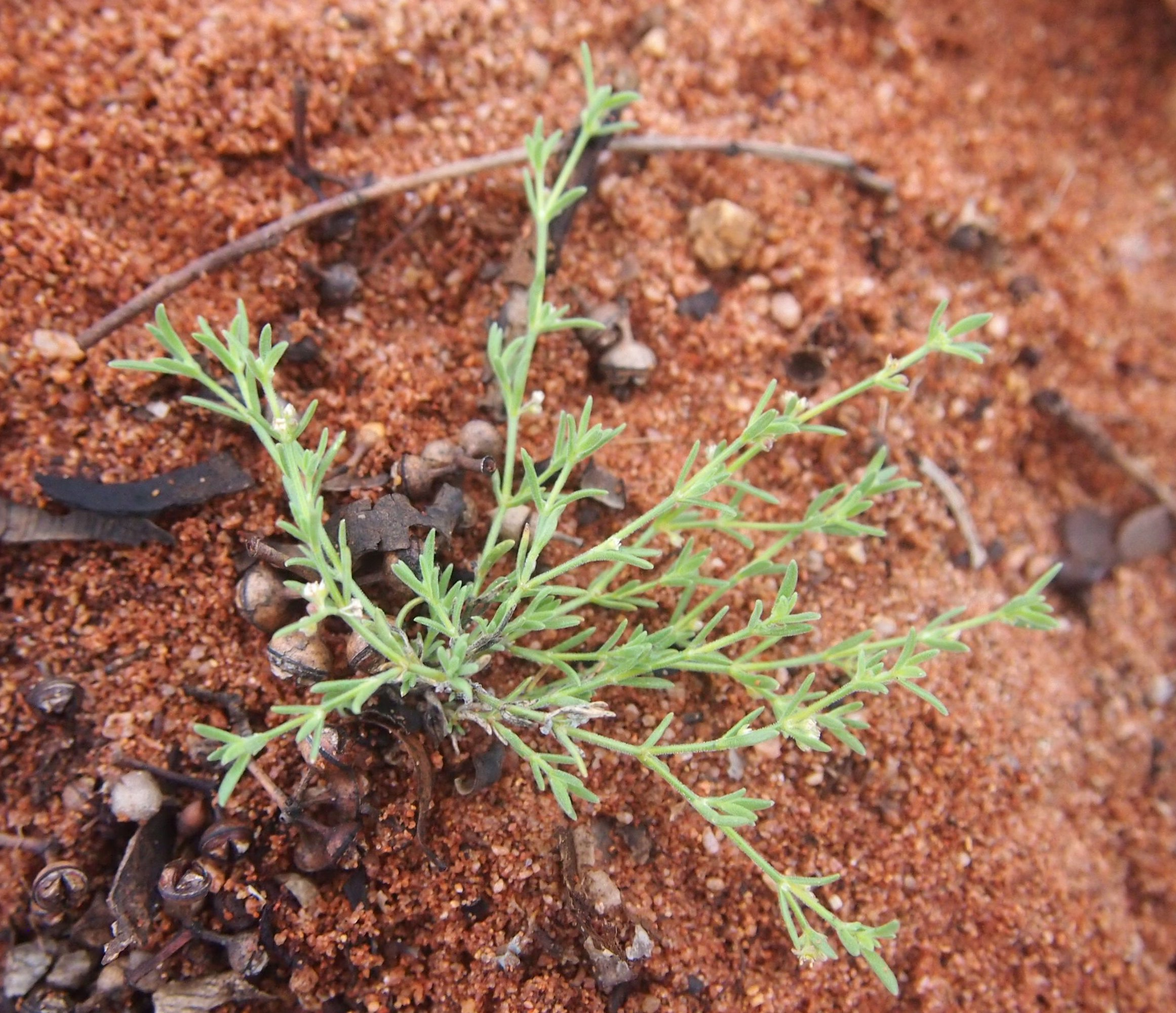
- Synaptantha tillaeacea

Scientific classification
- Kingdom: Plantae
- Clade: Tracheophytes
- Clade: Angiosperms
- Clade: Eudicots
- Clade: Asterids
- Order: Gentianales
- Family: Rubiaceae
- Genus: Synaptantha; Hook.f.

= Synaptantha =

Genus of plants

Synaptantha is a genus of flowering plants belonging to the family Rubiaceae.

Its native range is Australia.

Species:

- Synaptantha scleranthoides (F.Muell.) Pedley ex Halford
- Synaptantha tillaeacea (F.Muell.) Hook.f.
