= Pentaloncha =

Scientific classification
- Kingdom: Plantae
- Clade: Tracheophytes
- Clade: Angiosperms
- Clade: Eudicots
- Clade: Asterids
- Order: Gentianales
- Family: Rubiaceae
- Genus: Pentaloncha; Hook.f.

Genus of plants

Pentaloncha is a genus of flowering plants belonging to the family Rubiaceae.

Its native range is Western Central Tropical Africa.

== Species ==
Species:

- Pentaloncha humilis Hook.f.
