= Tromlyca =

Scientific classification
- Kingdom: Plantae
- Clade: Tracheophytes
- Clade: Angiosperms
- Clade: Eudicots
- Clade: Asterids
- Order: Gentianales
- Family: Rubiaceae
- Genus: Tromlyca; Borhidi

Genus of flowering plants

Tromlyca is a genus of flowering plants belonging to the family Rubiaceae.

Its native range is Colombia.

Species:

- Tromlyca locellata (C.M.Taylor) Borhidi
