= Schismatoclada =

Scientific classification
- Kingdom: Plantae
- Clade: Tracheophytes
- Clade: Angiosperms
- Clade: Eudicots
- Clade: Asterids
- Order: Gentianales
- Family: Rubiaceae
- Genus: Schismatoclada; Baker

Genus of plants

Schismatoclada is a genus of flowering plants belonging to the family Rubiaceae.

Its native range is Madagascar.

== Species ==
Species:

- Schismatoclada aurantiaca Homolle
- Schismatoclada aurea Homolle
- Schismatoclada bracteata Homolle ex Cavaco
- Schismatoclada citrifolia (Lam. ex Poir.) Homolle
- Schismatoclada concinna Baker
- Schismatoclada coursiana Cavaco
- Schismatoclada farahimpensis Homolle
- Schismatoclada homollei Boiteau
- Schismatoclada humbertiana Homolle
- Schismatoclada longistipula Cavaco
- Schismatoclada lutea Homolle
- Schismatoclada marojejyensis Humbert
- Schismatoclada psychotrioides Baker
- Schismatoclada pubescens Homolle
- Schismatoclada purpurea Homolle
- Schismatoclada rubra Homolle
- Schismatoclada thouarsiana (Baill.) Homolle
- Schismatoclada viburnoides Baker
- Schismatoclada villiflora Homolle ex Cavaco
