= Lecariocalyx =

Scientific classification
- Kingdom: Plantae
- Clade: Tracheophytes
- Clade: Angiosperms
- Clade: Eudicots
- Clade: Asterids
- Order: Gentianales
- Family: Rubiaceae
- Genus: Lecariocalyx; Bremek.

Genus of plants

Lecariocalyx is a genus of flowering plants belonging to the family Rubiaceae.

Its native range is Borneo.

Species:

- Lecariocalyx borneensis Bremek.
