= Monosalpinx =

Scientific classification
- Kingdom: Plantae
- Clade: Tracheophytes
- Clade: Angiosperms
- Clade: Eudicots
- Clade: Asterids
- Order: Gentianales
- Family: Rubiaceae
- Genus: Monosalpinx; N.Hallé

Genus of plants

Monosalpinx is a genus of flowering plants belonging to the family Rubiaceae.

Its native range is Western Tropical Africa.

Species:

- Monosalpinx guillaumetii N.Hallé
