= Ludekia =

Scientific classification
- Kingdom: Plantae
- Clade: Tracheophytes
- Clade: Angiosperms
- Clade: Eudicots
- Clade: Asterids
- Order: Gentianales
- Family: Rubiaceae
- Genus: Ludekia; Ridsdale

Genus of plants

Ludekia is a genus of flowering plants belonging to the family Rubiaceae.

Its native range is Malesia.

== Species ==
Species:

- Ludekia bernardoi (Merr.) Ridsdale
- Ludekia borneensis Ridsdale
