= Crobylanthe =

Scientific classification
- Kingdom: Plantae
- Clade: Tracheophytes
- Clade: Angiosperms
- Clade: Eudicots
- Clade: Asterids
- Order: Gentianales
- Family: Rubiaceae
- Genus: Crobylanthe; Bremek.
- Species: C. pellacalyx

Binomial name
- Crobylanthe pellacalyx (Ridl.) Bremek.

Synonyms
- Urophyllum pellacalyx Ridl.; Urophyllum shelfordii Ridl.

Genus of plants

Crobylanthe is a monotypic genus of flowering plants in the family Rubiaceae. The genus contains only one species, viz. Crobylanthe pellacalyx, which is endemic to Sarawak.
