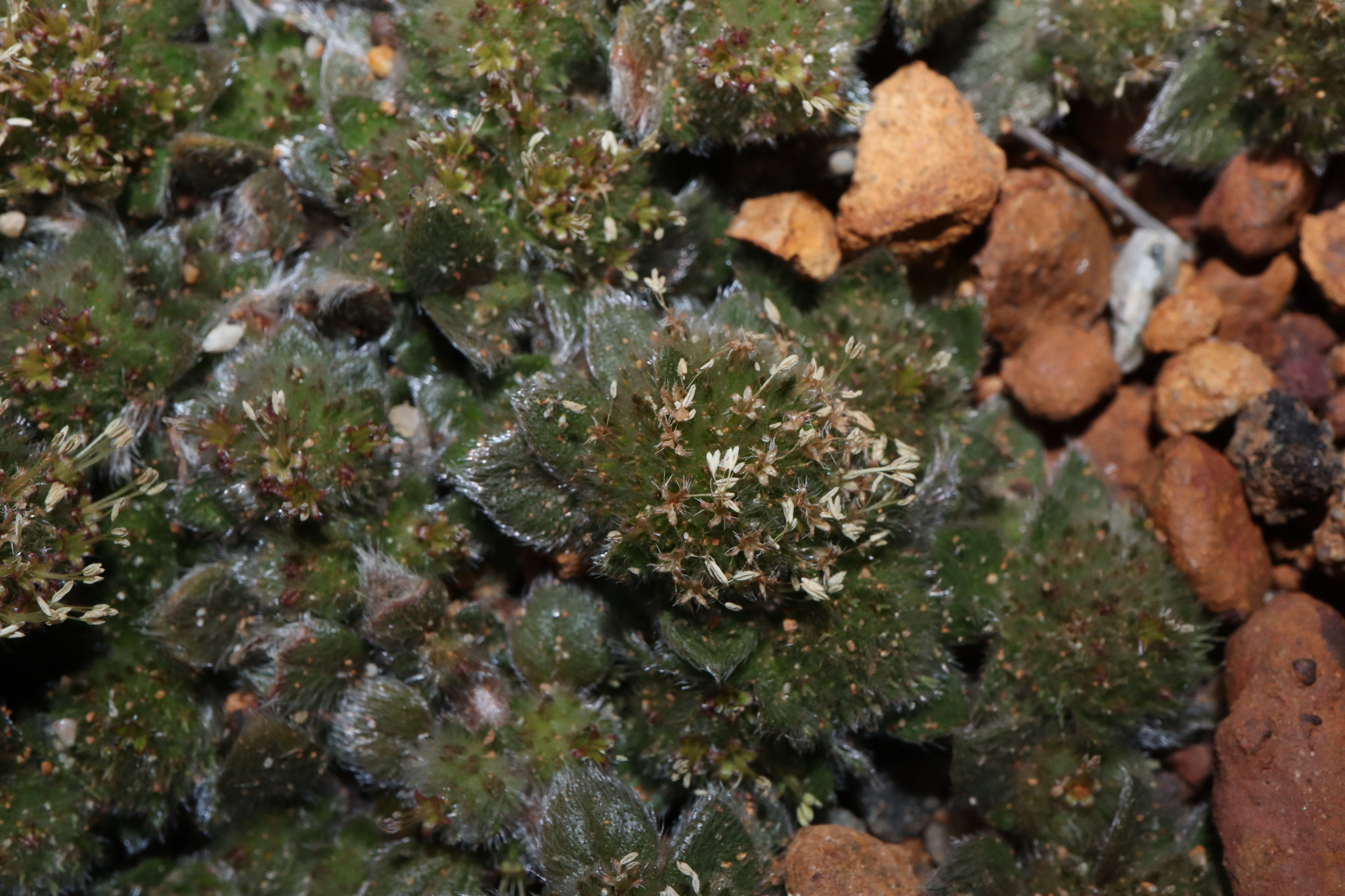

Scientific classification
- Kingdom: Plantae
- Clade: Tracheophytes
- Clade: Angiosperms
- Clade: Eudicots
- Clade: Asterids
- Order: Gentianales
- Family: Rubiaceae
- Genus: Eleuthranthes; F.Muell. ex Benth.
- Species: E. liberiflora

Binomial name
- Eleuthranthes liberiflora (F.Muell.) ined.

Synonyms
- Eleuthranthes opercularina F.Muell. ex Benth.; Opercularia liberiflora F.Muell.

= Eleuthranthes =

Eleuthranthes liberiflora

Genus of plants

Eleuthranthes is a monotypic genus of flowering plants in the family Rubiaceae. The genus contains only one species, Eleuthranthes liberiflora, which is endemic to Western Australia.
