= Clavistigma =

Scientific classification
- Kingdom: Plantae
- Clade: Tracheophytes
- Clade: Angiosperms
- Clade: Eudicots
- Clade: Asterids
- Order: Gentianales
- Family: Rubiaceae
- Subfamily: Dialypetalanthoideae
- Tribe: Clavistigmateae
- Genus: Clavistigma; T.Y.Tu & P.W.Xie
- Species: C. pendula

Binomial name
- Clavistigma pendula T.Y.Tu & P.W.Xie

Monotypic genus of flowering plant

Clavistigma is a monotypic genus of flowering plants in the Rubiaceae family described in 2024. This is the only genus in one in the tribe Clavistigmateae, and it contains only one species, viz. Clavistigma pendula, which is found in South-East Asia.
