= Mexotis =

Scientific classification
- Kingdom: Plantae
- Clade: Tracheophytes
- Clade: Angiosperms
- Clade: Eudicots
- Clade: Asterids
- Order: Gentianales
- Family: Rubiaceae
- Genus: Mexotis; Terrell & H.Rob.

Genus of plants

Mexotis is a genus of flowering plants belonging to the family Rubiaceae.

Its native range is Southern Mexico to Guatemala.

Species:

- Mexotis kingii (Terrell) Terrell & H.Rob.
- Mexotis latifolia (M.Martens & Galeotti) Terrell & H.Rob.
- Mexotis lorencei Terrell & H.Rob.
- Mexotis terrellii (Lorence) Terrell & H.Rob.
