= Micrasepalum =

Scientific classification
- Kingdom: Plantae
- Clade: Tracheophytes
- Clade: Angiosperms
- Clade: Eudicots
- Clade: Asterids
- Order: Gentianales
- Family: Rubiaceae
- Genus: Micrasepalum; Urb.

Genus of plants

Micrasepalum is a genus of flowering plants belonging to the family Rubiaceae.

Its native range is Caribbean.

Species:

- Micrasepalum eritrichoides (C.Wright ex Griseb.) Urb.
- Micrasepalum haitiense Urb. & Ekman
