= Dolichocarpa =

Scientific classification
- Kingdom: Plantae
- Clade: Tracheophytes
- Clade: Angiosperms
- Clade: Eudicots
- Clade: Asterids
- Order: Gentianales
- Family: Rubiaceae
- Genus: Dolichocarpa; K.L.Gibbons (2020)

Species
- 5; see text

Genus of plants

Dolichocarpa is a genus of flowering plants in the family Rubiaceae. It includes five species endemic to northern Australia, ranging from Western Australia to the Northern Territory and Queensland.

- Dolichocarpa argillacea (Halford) K.L.Gibbons
- Dolichocarpa coerulescens (F.Muell.) K.L.Gibbons
- Dolichocarpa crouchiana (F.Muell.) K.L.Gibbons
- Dolichocarpa spathulata (Halford) K.L.Gibbons
- Dolichocarpa spermacocoides (F.Muell.) K.L.Gibbons
