= Martensianthus =

Scientific classification
- Kingdom: Plantae
- Clade: Tracheophytes
- Clade: Angiosperms
- Clade: Eudicots
- Clade: Asterids
- Order: Gentianales
- Family: Rubiaceae
- Genus: Martensianthus; Borhidi & Lozada-Pérez

Synonyms
- Neomartensia Borhidi & Lozada-Pérez

Genus of plants

Martensianthus is a genus of flowering plants belonging to the family Rubiaceae.

It is native to southern Mexico.

The genus name of Martensianthus is in honour of Martin Martens (1797–1863), a Belgian botanist and chemist born in Maastricht, Netherlands. It was first described and published in Acta Bot. Hung. Vol.53 on page 25 in 2011.

== Known species ==
According to Kew:

- Martensianthus breviflorus (Borhidi & Salas-Mor.) Borhidi
- Martensianthus galeottii (M.Martens) Borhidi & Lozada-Pérez
- Martensianthus macdougallii (Lorence) Borhidi & Lozada-Pérez
- Martensianthus micranthus (Borhidi) Borhidi
- Martensianthus viticellus (Lorea-Hern. & Lozada-Pérez) Borhidi
