= Pachystylus (plant) =

Scientific classification
- Kingdom: Plantae
- Clade: Tracheophytes
- Clade: Angiosperms
- Clade: Eudicots
- Clade: Asterids
- Order: Gentianales
- Family: Rubiaceae
- Genus: Pachystylus; K.Schum. (1889)

Species
- Pachystylus henningsianus Warb.; Pachystylus zippelianus (Miq.) Bremek.

Genus of plants

Pachystylus is a genus of flowering plants in the family Rubiaceae. It includes two species of shrubs or small trees endemic to New Guinea. They grow in lowland, lower montane, and riverine forests on peaty, rocky, and alluvial soils.

- Pachystylus henningsianus Warb. – Aru Islands
- Pachystylus zippelianus (Miq.) Bremek. – eastern New Guinea
