= Stenotis (plant) =

Scientific classification
- Kingdom: Plantae
- Clade: Tracheophytes
- Clade: Angiosperms
- Clade: Eudicots
- Clade: Asterids
- Order: Gentianales
- Family: Rubiaceae
- Genus: Stenotis; Terrell

Genus of plants

Stenotis is a genus of flowering plants belonging to the family Rubiaceae.

Its native range is Arizona (USA) to Mexico.

Species:

- Stenotis arenaria (Rose) Terrell
- Stenotis asperuloides (Benth.) Terrell
