= Cosmocalyx =

Scientific classification
- Kingdom: Plantae
- Clade: Tracheophytes
- Clade: Angiosperms
- Clade: Eudicots
- Clade: Asterids
- Order: Gentianales
- Family: Rubiaceae
- Subfamily: Cinchonoideae
- Tribe: Hamelieae
- Genus: Cosmocalyx; Standl.
- Species: C. spectabilis

Binomial name
- Cosmocalyx spectabilis Standl.

Genus of flowering plants

Cosmocalyx is a monotypic genus of flowering plants in the family Rubiaceae. The genus contains only one species, viz. Cosmocalyx spectabilis, which is found in Mexico, Belize, and Guatemala.

== Description ==
Cosmocalyx spectabilis is a slender tree, up to 15 m (49 ft) in height and 20 cm (7.9 in) in diameter (dbh). After anthesis, one of the four calyx lobes expands into a reddish, leaf-like structure called a calycophyll. These facilitate dispersal of the fruit by wind. The fruit is a cylindrical indehiscent bilocular capsule. Each locule contains one basally inserted seed. This combination of characters distinguishes Cosmocalyx from other genera in Rubiaceae.

== Systematics ==
Cosmocalyx was named by Paul Standley in 1930. The generic name is derived from the Ancient Greek words, kosmos, meaning "order", and kalyx, "a calyx".

Cosmocalyx is placed with Deppea, Hoffmannia, Hamelia and several other genera in the tribe Hamelieae. Relationships within this tribe are uncertain.
