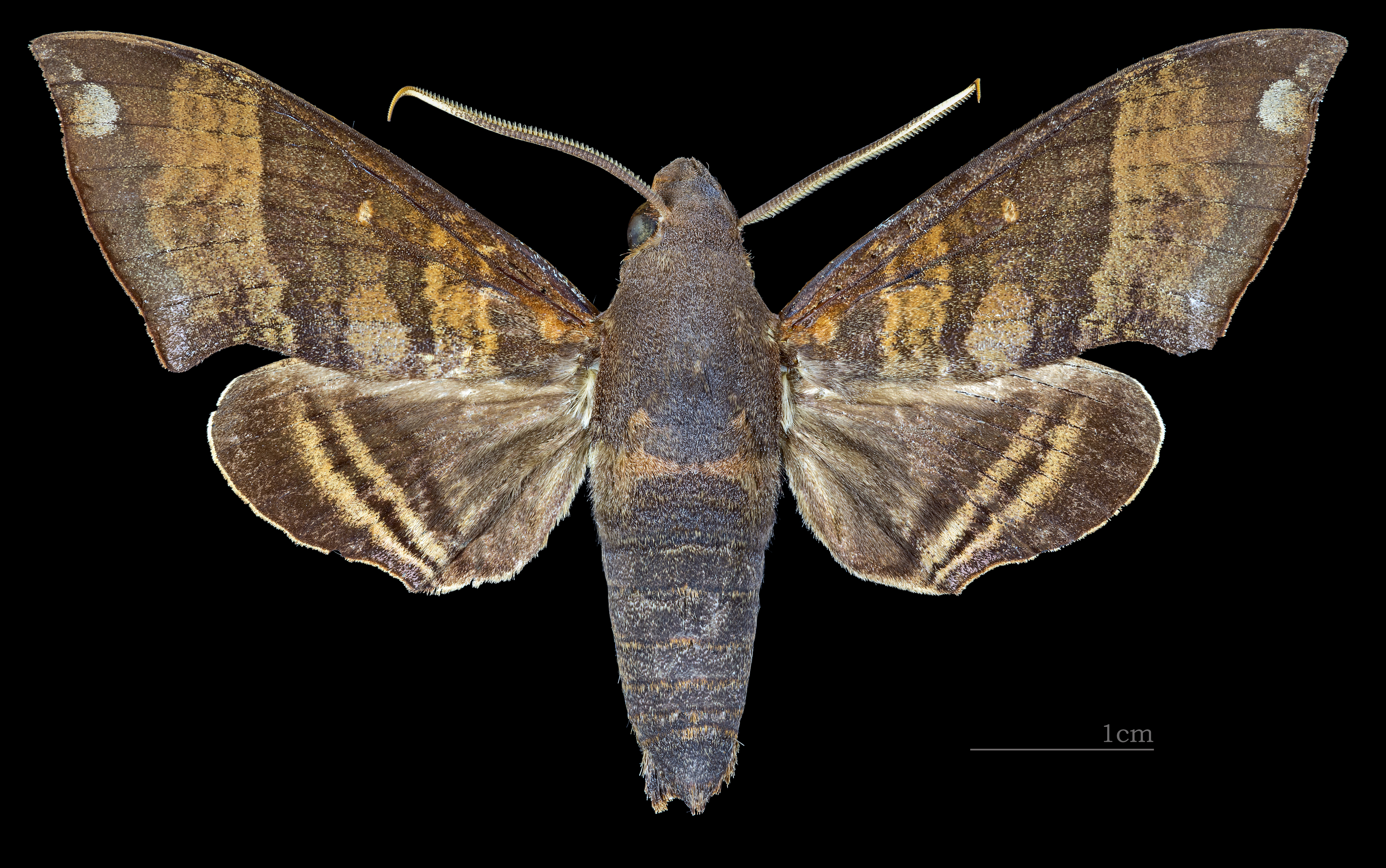
- Female dorsal view
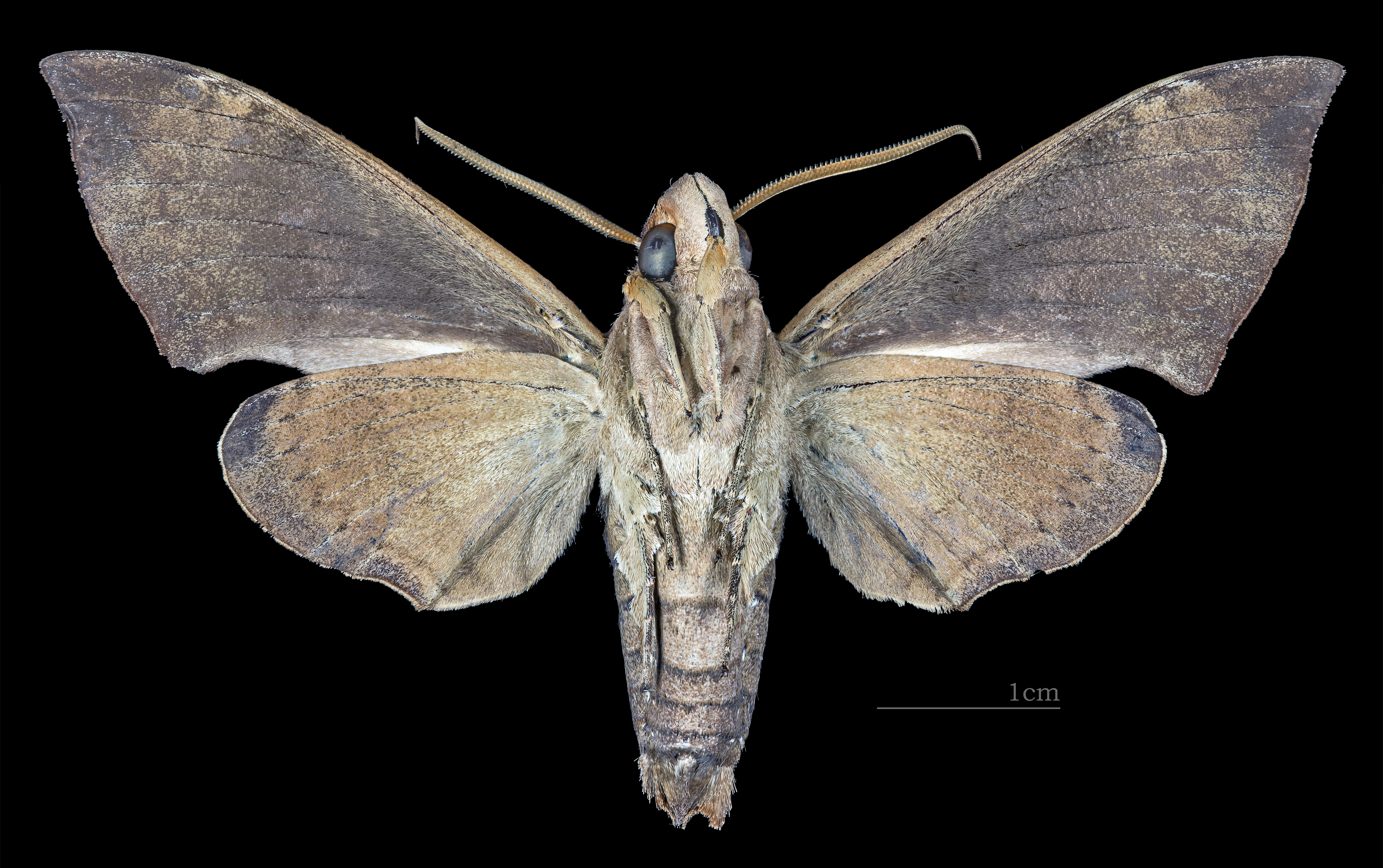
- Female ventral view

Scientific classification
- Domain: Eukaryota
- Kingdom: Animalia
- Phylum: Arthropoda
- Class: Insecta
- Order: Lepidoptera
- Family: Sphingidae
- Genus: Pachygonidia
- Species: P. caliginosa

Binomial name
- Pachygonidia caliginosa (Boisduval, 1870)

Synonyms
- Perigonia caliginosa Boisduval, 1870; Perigonia grandis Boisduval, 1875; Perigonia nimerod Boisduval, 1870

= Pachygonidia caliginosa =

Species of moth

Pachygonidia caliginosa is a moth of the family Sphingidae first described by Jean Baptiste Boisduval in 1870.

== Distribution ==
It is known from Brazil, Bolivia and Venezuela.

== Description ==
The wingspan is about 70 mm. The forewings are similar to those of Pachygonidia subhamata, but the apex is pointed. There are two median transverse pinkish-buff bands on the hindwing upperside.

== Biology ==
There are probably multiple generations per year with one record from March in Brazil.
