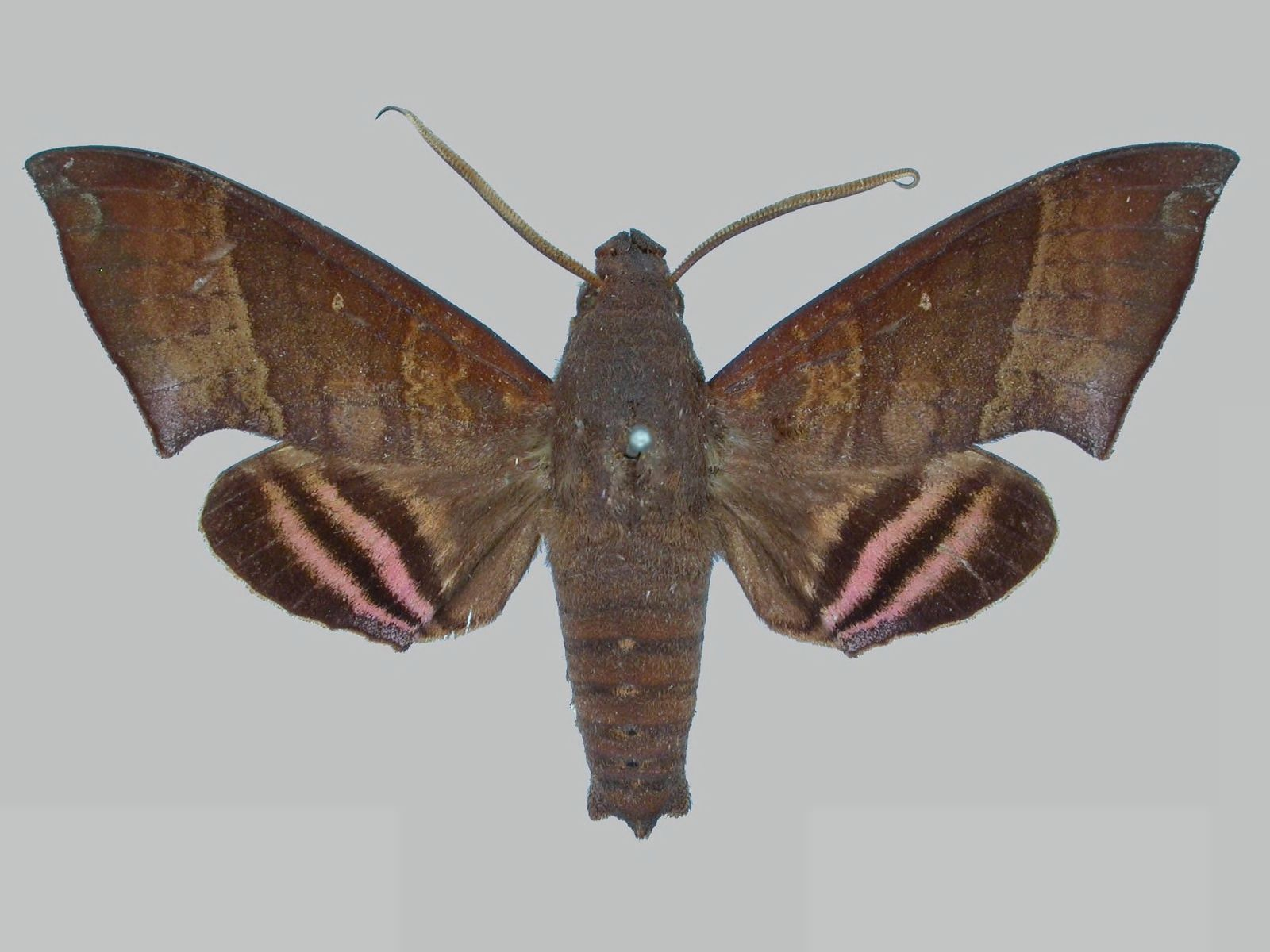

Scientific classification
- Domain: Eukaryota
- Kingdom: Animalia
- Phylum: Arthropoda
- Class: Insecta
- Order: Lepidoptera
- Family: Sphingidae
- Genus: Pachygonidia
- Species: P. drucei

Binomial name
- Pachygonidia drucei (Rothschild & Jordan, 1903)

Synonyms
- Pachygonia drucei Rothschild & Jordan, 1903

= Pachygonidia drucei =

Species of moth

Pachygonidia drucei is a moth of the family Sphingidae. It is found from Panama and Costa Rica north to Guatemala, Belize and Mexico.

The wingspan is 72–82 mm. The forewings are similar to those of Pachygonidia hopfferi, but the apex is pointed. Furthermore, there is a larger discal spot on the forewing upperside, the clayish patch below the apex is much more distinct and the whitish tornal scaling is more obvious. There are three median transverse rose-pinkish bands on the hindwing upperside.

There are probably multiple generations per year with one record from June in Panama.

The larvae have been recorded feeding on Doliocarpus dentatus, Doliocarpus multiflorus and Tetracera hydrophila.
