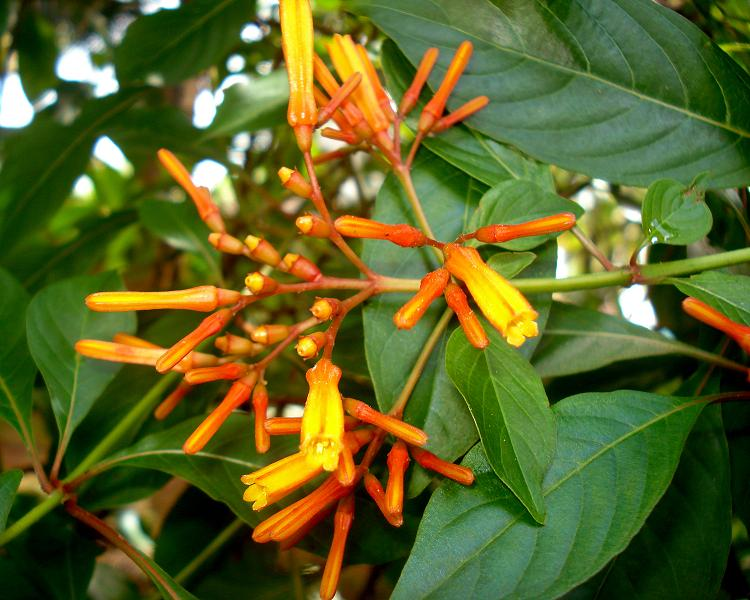
- Hamelia patens

Scientific classification
- Kingdom: Plantae
- Clade: Tracheophytes
- Clade: Angiosperms
- Clade: Eudicots
- Clade: Asterids
- Order: Gentianales
- Family: Rubiaceae
- Subfamily: Cinchonoideae
- Tribe: Hamelieae; A.Rich. ex DC.

Type genus
- Hamelia Jacq.

Synonyms
- Deppeeae J.H.Kirkbr.

= Hamelieae =

Tribe of plants

Hamelieae is a tribe of flowering plants in the family Rubiaceae and contains about 171 species in 6 genera. Its representatives are found in tropical and subtropical America. The sister tribe Hillieae is sometimes here included.

== Genera ==
Currently accepted names

- Chione DC. (1 sp)
- Cosmocalyx Standl. (1 sp)
- Deppea Schltdl. & Cham. (35 sp)
- Hamelia Jacq. (17 sp)
- Hoffmannia Sw. (115 sp)
- Omiltemia Standl. (2 sp)

Synonyms

- Campylobotrys Lem. = Hoffmannia
- Choristes Benth. = Deppea
- Crusea A.Rich. = Chione
- Duhamelia Pers. = Hamelia
- Euosmia Humb. & Bonpl. = Hoffmannia
- Evosmia Kunth = Hoffmannia
- Higginsia Pers. = Hoffmannia
- Koehneago Kuntze = Hoffmannia
- Lonicera Adans. = Hamelia
- Ohigginsia Ruiz & Pav. = Hoffmannia
- Ophryococcus Oerst. = Hoffmannia
- Oregandra Standl. = Chione
- Sacconia Endl. = Chione
- Schenckia K.Schum. = Deppea
- Tangaraca Adans. = Hamelia
- Tepesia C.F.Gaertn. = Hamelia
- Xerococcus Oerst. = Hoffmannia
