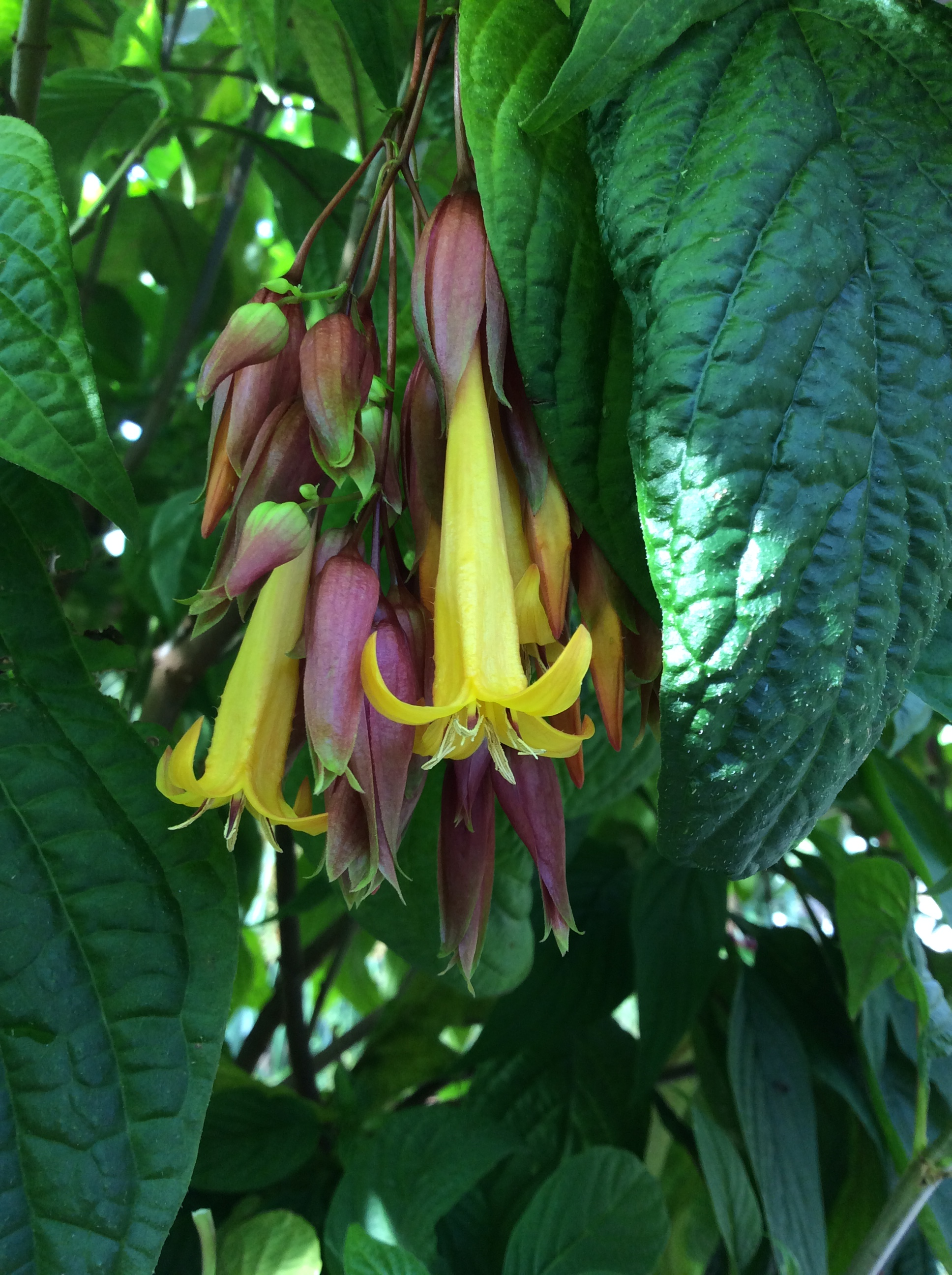

Conservation status
- Extinct in the Wild (IUCN 3.1)

Scientific classification
- Kingdom: Plantae
- Clade: Embryophytes
- Clade: Tracheophytes
- Clade: Spermatophytes
- Clade: Angiosperms
- Clade: Eudicots
- Clade: Asterids
- Order: Gentianales
- Family: Rubiaceae
- Genus: Deppea
- Species: D. splendens

Binomial name
- Deppea splendens Breedlove & Lorence
- Deppea splendens was endemic to Chiapas, Mexico

Synonyms
- Csapodya challengeri Borhidi & Reyes-García; Csapodya splendens (Breedlove & Lorence) Borhidi; Csapodya sousae Borhidi & Reyes-García

= Deppea splendens =

Golden fuchsia

Species of plant

Deppea splendens, commonly known as the golden fuchsia, is a species of flowering plant in the family Rubiaceae endemic to Chiapas, Mexico. It is extinct in the wild. Despite its common name, it is not related to the true Fuchsia genus.

== Description ==
=== Vegetative characteristics ===
Deppea splendens is an evergreen, 5–8 m (16–26 ft) tall shrub or tree with glabrous twigs. The petiolate, stipulate, elliptic to ovate-elliptic leaves with an acuminate apex are 4.5–15 cm long, and 0.8-6 cm wide. The petiole is 0.8–3.8 cm long. Leaves are arranged in whorls of three, or occasionally opposite.

=== Generative characteristics ===
The terminal, pendulous, brightly coloured inflorescences bear 16–25 pendulous, tubular, tetramerous, ornithophilous 5–6 cm long flowers with a red calyx and yellow-orange petals. The tricolporate pollen grains are 21.9–25.7 μm big. The compressed, ellipsoid, 6–8 mm long, and 5–7 mm wide loculicidal capsule fruit bears dark brown, 0.6–1 mm long seeds.

== Taxonomy ==
It was described by Dennis Eugene Breedlove and David H. Lorence in 1987. Within the subfamily Dialypetalanthoideae it is placed in the tribe Hamelieae.

=== Etymology ===
The specific epithet splendens means shining or brilliant.

== Distribution and habitat ==
It was once native to high elevation cloud forest in the state Chiapas, Mexico, but has been presumed extinct in the wild since its habitat was cleared for farmland. It is now found only in horticulture, although efforts have been made to reintroduce it in Mexico.

== History ==
Dennis Breedlove was a botanist at the California Academy of Science researching plants and ethnobotany in Chiapas when he discovered it in 1972 in the Motozintla de Mendoza municipality; he sent seeds of the then undescribed shrub to San Francisco in 1981 (he described it formally in 1987). That seed was grown at the University of California Botanical Garden, and the Huntington. All plants in existence are from that introduction. It is now widely grown, including in the San Francisco Conservatory of flowers, The San Francisco Botanical Garden at Strybing Arboretum, and at the Huntington in Southern California.

== Conservation ==
The only known population was destroyed for farmland. It only persists in ex-situ collections in botanic gardens and private collections.

== Ecology ==
The flowers are pollinated by hummingbirds. It was found in mixed cloud forest with deciduous and evergreen vegetation, and was abundant along a stream.

== Cultivation ==
It can be easily cultivated in well-drained, nutrient rich substrate under bright and warm conditions, but does not tolerate consistently hot and humid climates. Deppea splendens is self-incompatible, but it can also be propagated vegetatively. At least three clones have been named: ‘Augustin’, ‘Bartolome’, and ‘Cristobal’.
