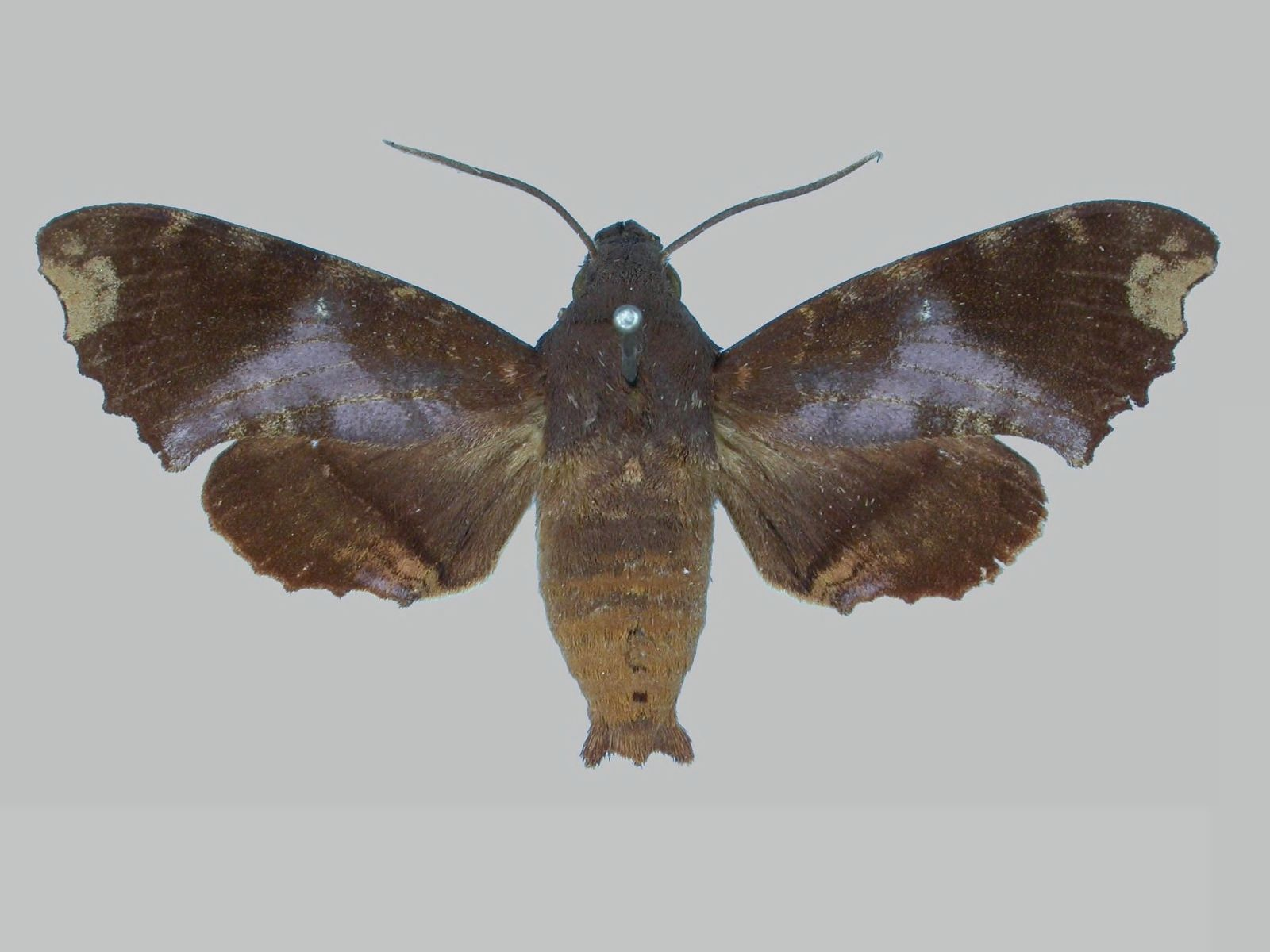

Scientific classification
- Domain: Eukaryota
- Kingdom: Animalia
- Phylum: Arthropoda
- Class: Insecta
- Order: Lepidoptera
- Family: Sphingidae
- Genus: Pachygonidia
- Species: P. ribbei

Binomial name
- Pachygonidia ribbei (H. Druce, 1881)

Synonyms
- Pachygonia ribbei H. Druce, 1881; Pachygonia peruviana Joicey & Talbot, 1921

= Pachygonidia ribbei =

Species of moth

Pachygonidia ribbei is a moth of the family Sphingidae first described by Herbert Druce in 1881. It is known from Peru, Panama and Costa Rica.

The wingspan is 56–62 mm. It can be distinguished from all other Pachygonidia species by the lack of distinct pale bands on the hindwing upperside. There is a distinct and large pale brown submarginal patch on the forewing upperside, as well as diffuse patches of pale violet scales on the median and posterior parts of the wing.

There are probably multiple generations per year.

The larvae feed on Hamelia patens and Hamelia axilaris. There are green and brown larval forms.
