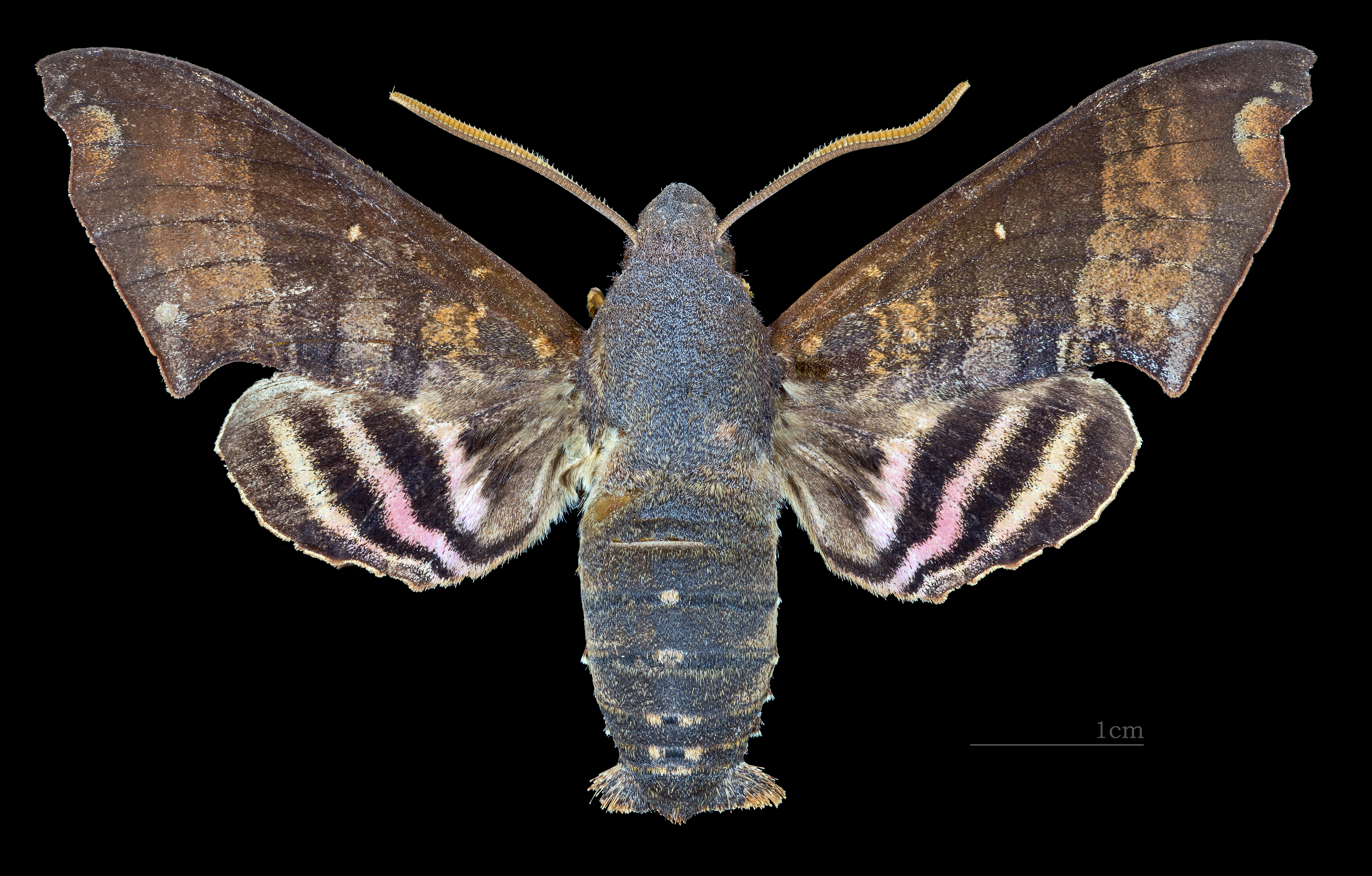
- Male dorsal
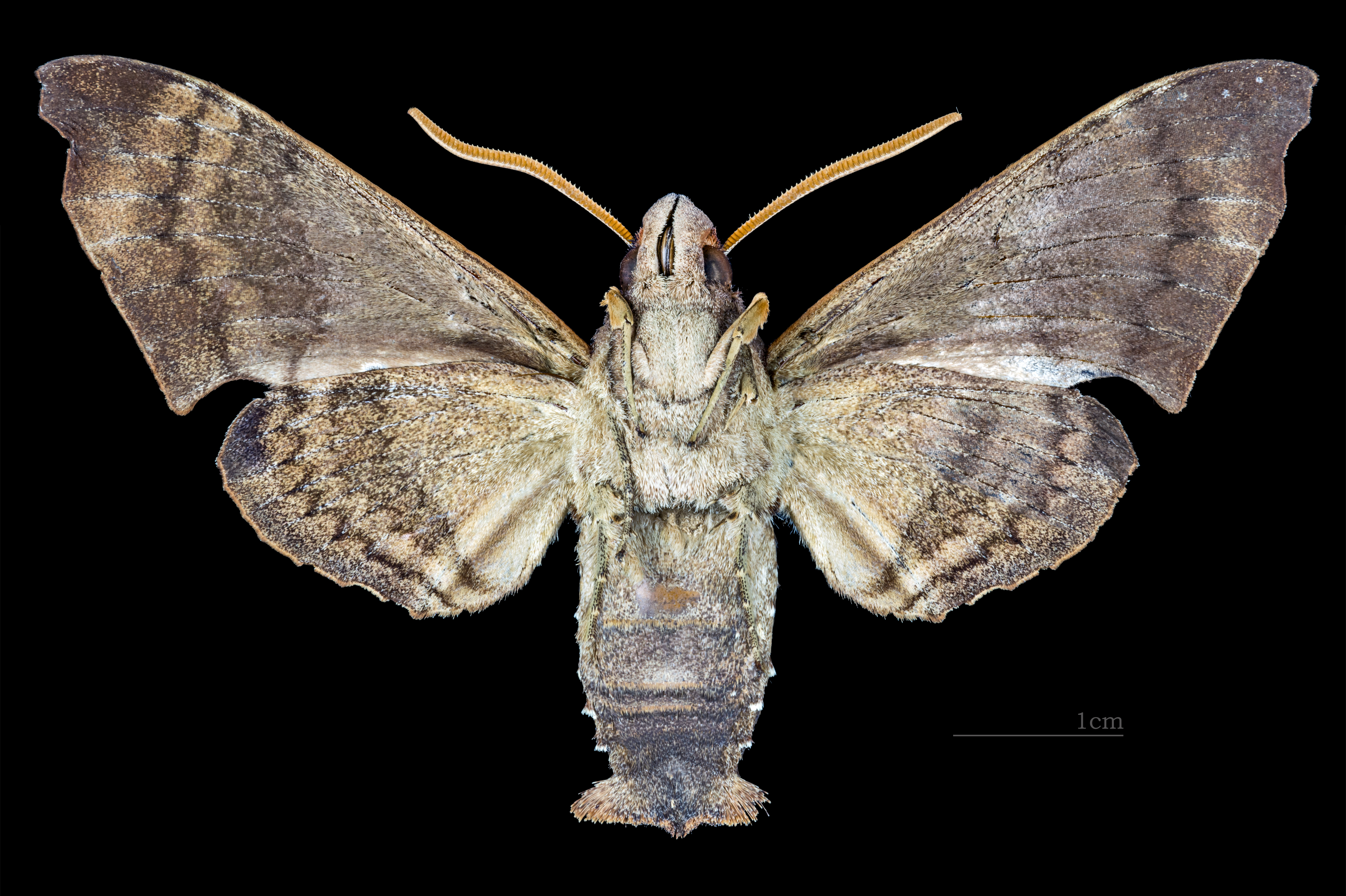
- Male ventral

Scientific classification
- Domain: Eukaryota
- Kingdom: Animalia
- Phylum: Arthropoda
- Class: Insecta
- Order: Lepidoptera
- Family: Sphingidae
- Genus: Pachygonidia
- Species: P. martini

Binomial name
- Pachygonidia martini (Gehlen, 1943)

Synonyms
- Pachygonia martini Gehlen, 1943

= Pachygonidia martini =

Species of moth

Pachygonidia martini is a moth of the family Sphingidae.

== Distribution ==
It is known from Central America and South America. It has been recorded as far south as Bolivia and Peru.

== Biology ==
There are probably multiple generations per year.

The larvae probably feed on Doliocarpus dentatus, Doliocarpus multiflorus and Tetracera hydrophila.
