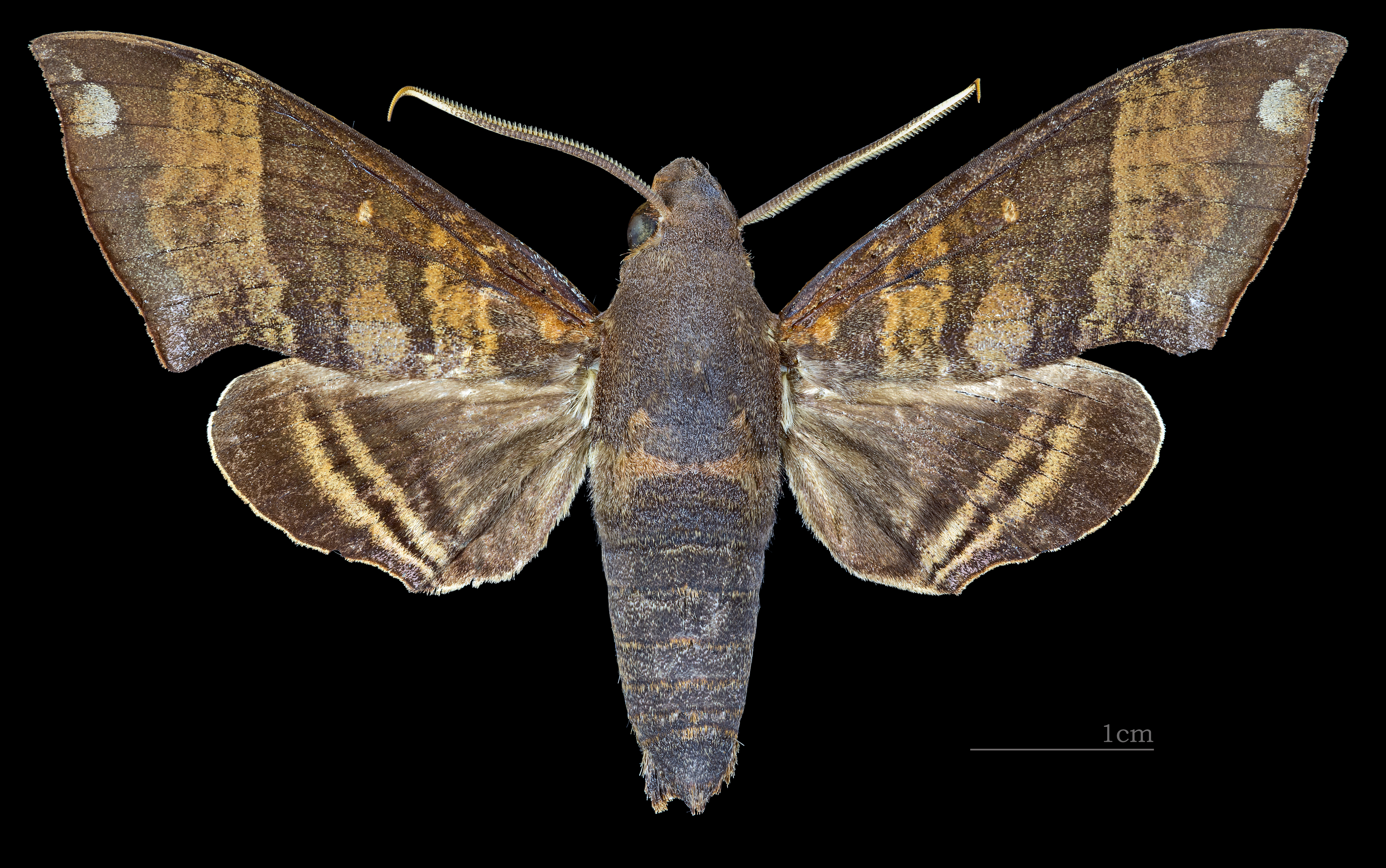
- Pachygonidia caliginosa

Scientific classification
- Domain: Eukaryota
- Kingdom: Animalia
- Phylum: Arthropoda
- Class: Insecta
- Order: Lepidoptera
- Family: Sphingidae
- Subtribe: Dilophonotina
- Genus: Pachygonidia; D. S. Fletcher, 1982

Synonyms
- Pachygonia R. Felder, 1874

= Pachygonidia =

Genus of moths

Pachygonidia is a genus of moths in the family Sphingidae described by David Stephen Fletcher in 1982.

== Species ==
- Pachygonidia caliginosa (Boisduval, 1870)
- Pachygonidia drucei (Rothschild & Jordan, 1903)
- Pachygonidia hopfferi (Staudinger, 1875)
- Pachygonidia martini (Gehlen, 1943)
- Pachygonidia mielkei Cadiou, 1997
- Pachygonidia odile Eitschberger & Haxaire, 2002
- Pachygonidia ribbei (H. Druce, 1881)
- Pachygonidia subhamata (Walker, 1856)
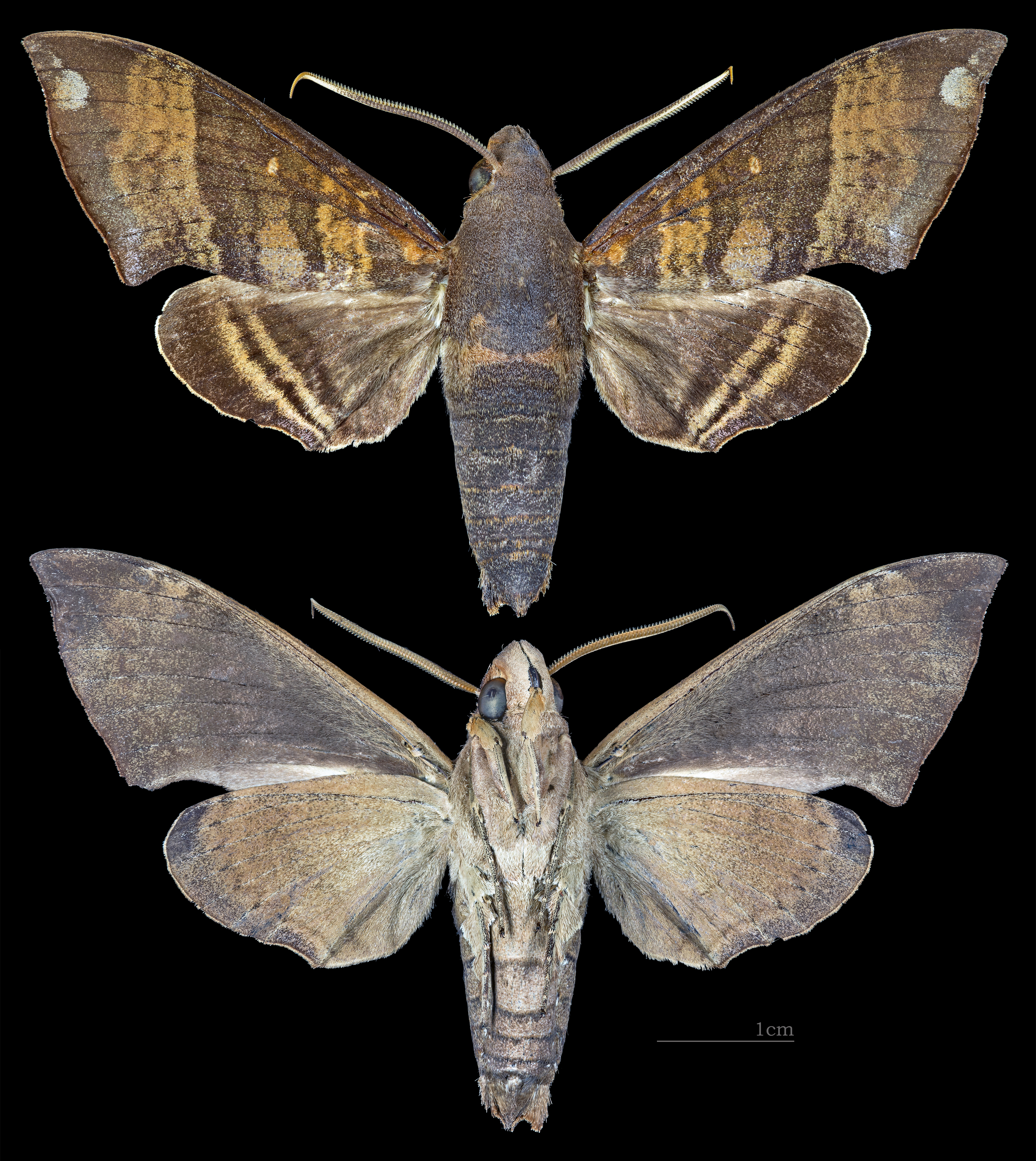
Pachygonidia caliginosa

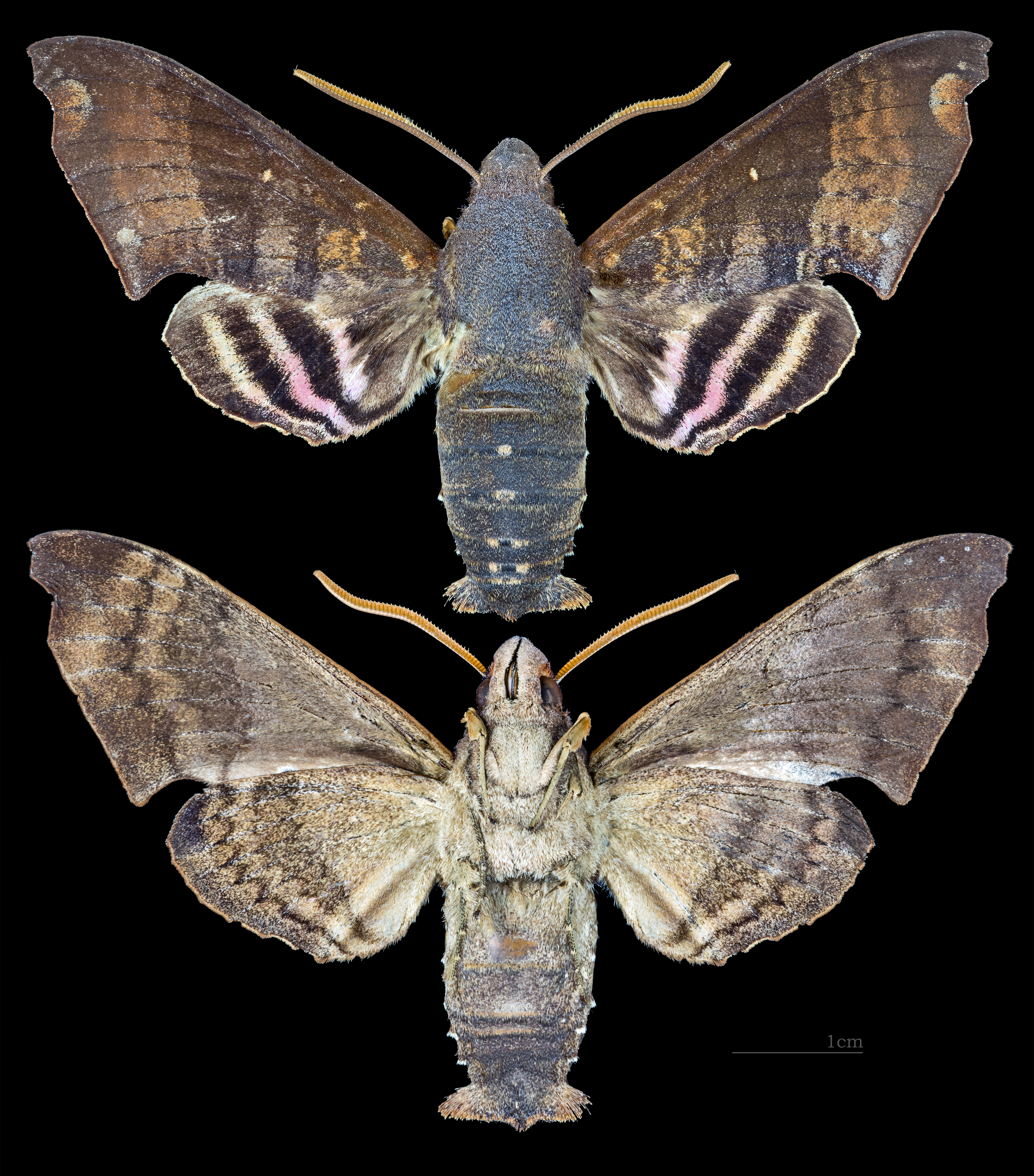
Pachygonidia martini

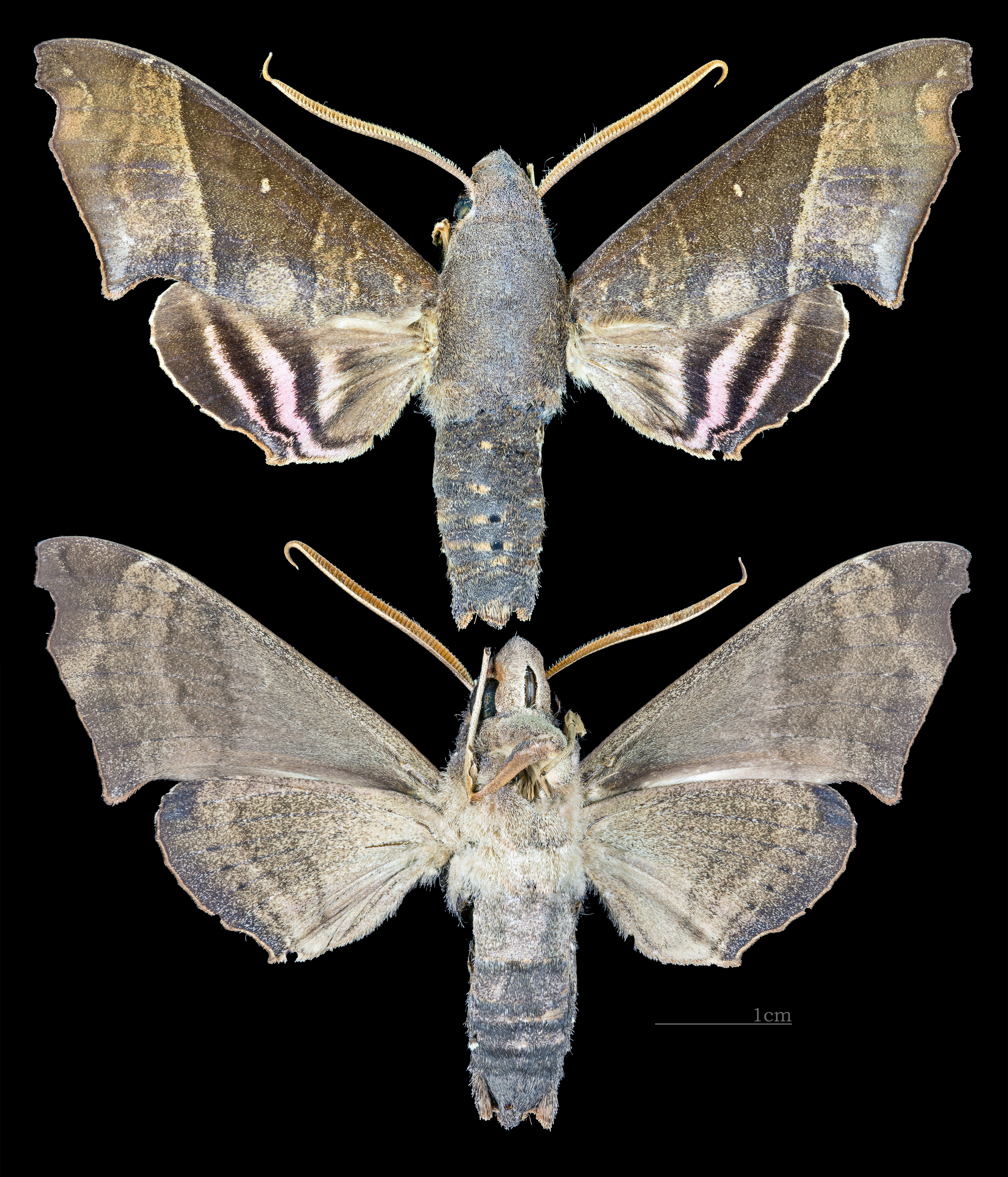
Pachygonidia hopfferi

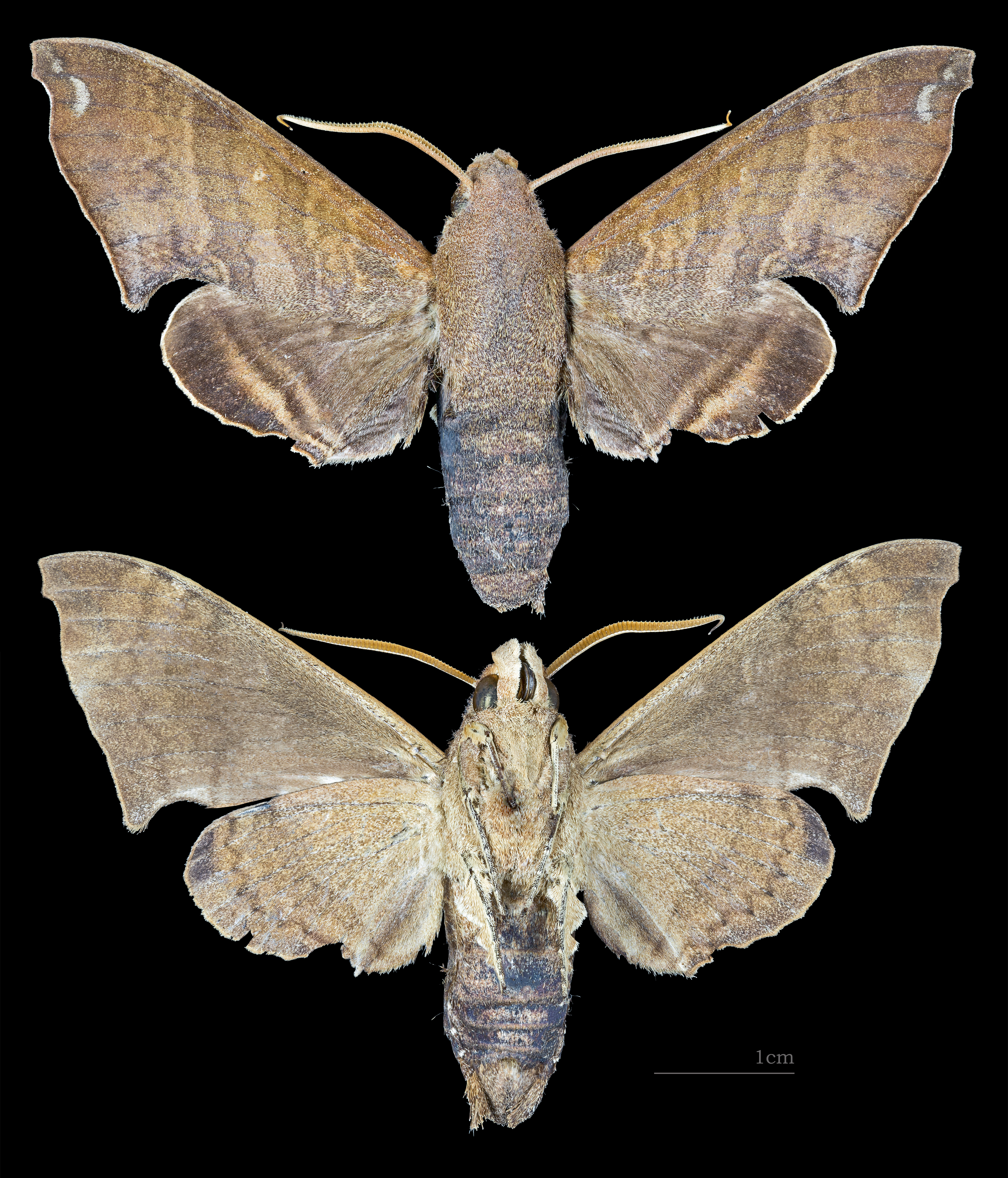
Pachygonidia subhamata
