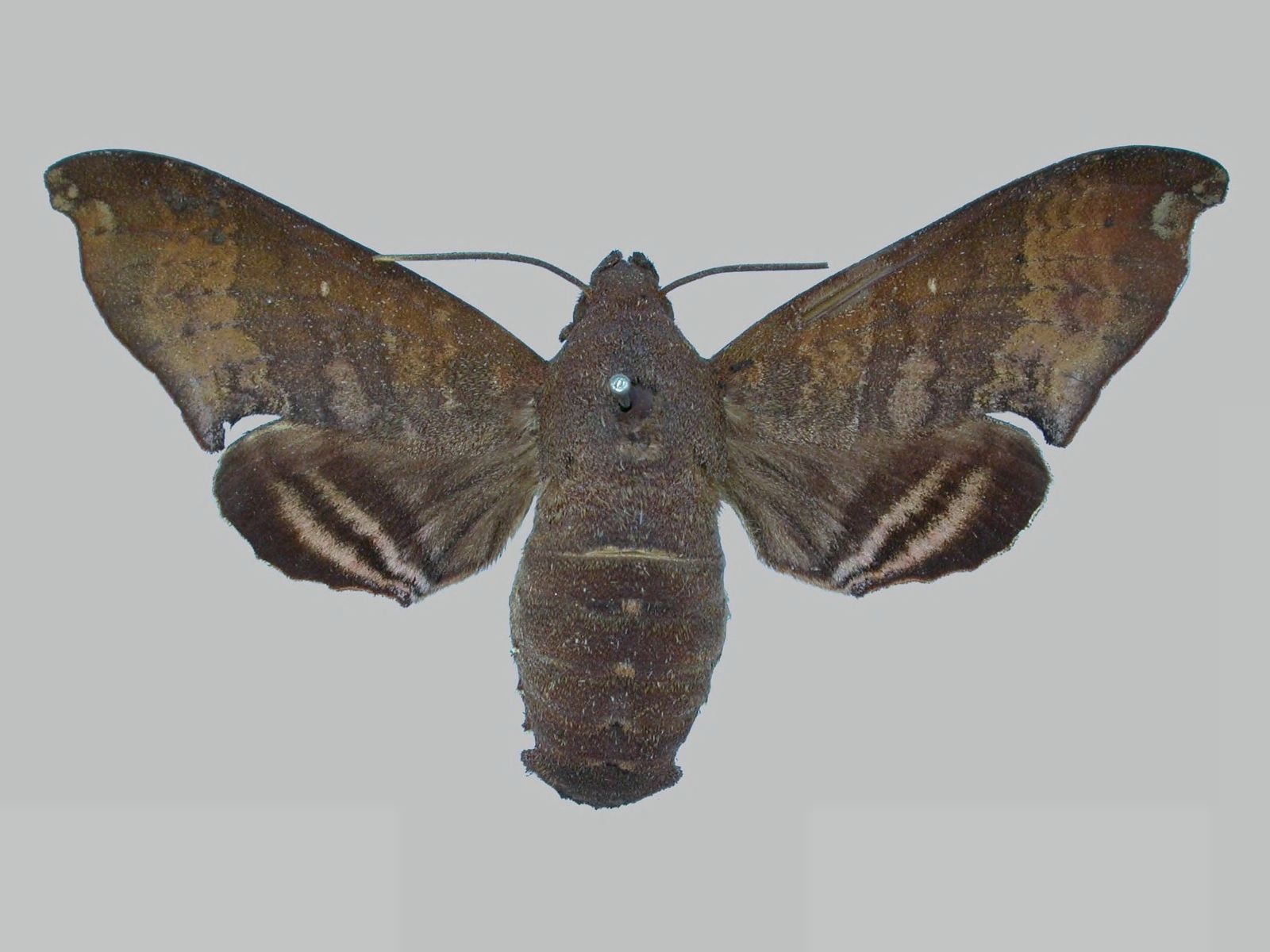
- Female, upperside from Espírito Santo, Brazil

Scientific classification
- Kingdom: Animalia
- Phylum: Arthropoda
- Clade: Pancrustacea
- Class: Insecta
- Order: Lepidoptera
- Family: Sphingidae
- Genus: Pachygonidia
- Species: P. mielkei

Binomial name
- Pachygonidia mielkei Cadiou, 1997

= Pachygonidia mielkei =

Species of moth

Pachygonidia mielkei is a moth of the family Sphingidae first described by Jean-Marie Cadiou in 1997. It is found in Brazil.

The length of the forewings is 32–35 mm for males and 35–37 mm for females. There is a distinct grey-brown submarginal patch on the forewing upperside and there are two median transverse pinkish-buff bands on the hindwing upperside.
