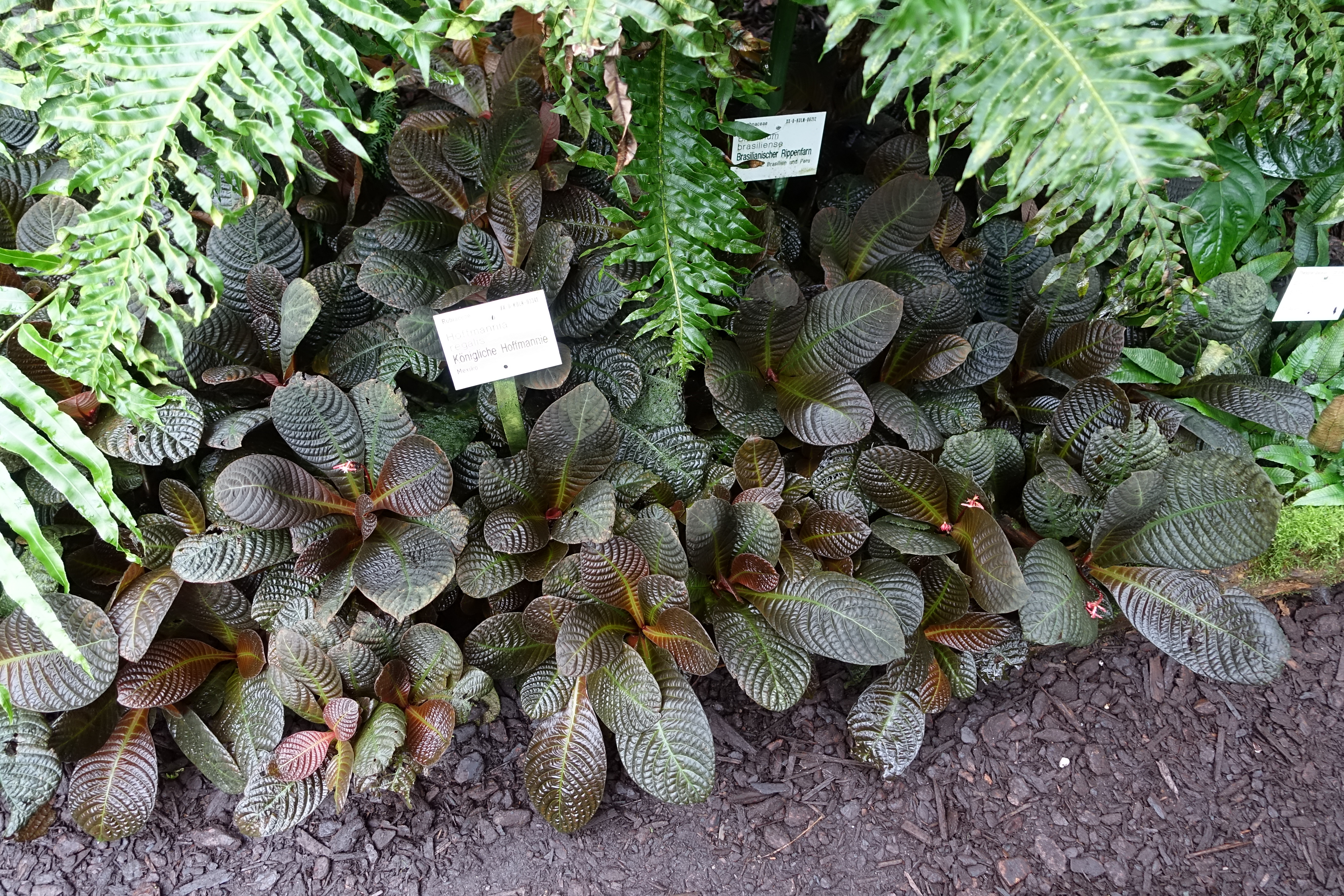

Scientific classification
- Kingdom: Plantae
- Clade: Tracheophytes
- Clade: Angiosperms
- Clade: Eudicots
- Clade: Asterids
- Order: Gentianales
- Family: Rubiaceae
- Genus: Hoffmannia
- Species: H. regalis

Binomial name
- Hoffmannia regalis (Hook.) Hemsl.

= Hoffmannia regalis =

Species of plant

Hoffmannia regalis is a species of plant in the family Rubiaceae. It is endemic to Mexico.

== Synonyms ==
- Campylobotrys regalis Linden
- Higginsia aggregata f. ortgiesii Regel
- Higginsia aggregata f. roezlii Regel
- Higginsia regalis Hook.
- Hoffmannia lineolata Donn.Sm.
- Hoffmannia riparia Standl.
- Ohigginsia refulgens f. ortgiesii Regel
- Ohigginsia refulgens f. roezlii Regel
- Ohigginsia refulgens f. smaragdina Regel
