= Dennis Eugene Breedlove =

American botanist (1939–2012)

Dennis Eugene Breedlove (September 14, 1939, Oakland, California – June 4, 2012) was an American botanist, herbarium curator, and plant collector. He is "best known for his collections and floristic studies in the Mexican state of Chiapas, and his ethnobotanical work in that state with various collaborators."

== Education and career ==
After graduating from St. Joseph Notre Dame High School in 1957, Dennis Breedlove attended the University of California, Santa Barbara, where he graduated with an A.B. degree in 1962. In 1968 he graduated from Stanford University with a Ph.D. His doctoral dissertation, entitled "The systematics of Fuchsia section Encliandra (Onagraceae)", was written under the supervision of Peter H. Raven. After briefly working as a research botanist at the University of California Botanical Garden on the Berkeley campus,

Breedlove became in 1969 an assistant curator at San Francisco's California Academy of Sciences herbarium. For his entire career he was employed by the California Academy of Sciences, where he was promoted to associate curator, chaired the botany department, and retired as curator emeritus and a lifetime fellow.

With the exception of brief collecting trips to Trinidad and the páramo in the Cordillera Oriental of Colombia, his field work was centered in western North America and northern Latin America. Research on plants of California and Nevada (especially in the Sweetwater Mountains on the border be-tween these states), Mexico (especially Chiapas, the Sierra Surutato in Sinaloa, and the peninsula of Baja California), and Guatemala led him on numerous collecting trips.

In 1960, he began working with ethnographer, anthropologist, and linguist Robert M. Laughlin to compile a comprehensive ethnobotanical inventory of the plants known to the Tzotzils living in the municipality of Zinacantán in the highlands Chiapas.

From hundreds of Tzotzil names for plant varieties they eventually identified 30 genera and 1,484 species, published in the volume The Flowering of Man: A Tzotzil Botany of Zinacantán (2000, previously published in 1993 as two volumes in Smithsonian Contributions to Anthropology).

In 1964, Breedlove (who could speak Tzeltal Mayan), Brent Berlin, and Peter H. Raven began 10 years of ethnobotanical research among the Tzeltals and other Maya peoples in the highlands of Chiapas. Their 660-page book Principles of Tzeltal Plant Classification was published in 1974 with a paperback reprint in 2013.

San Francisco Botanical Garden's Apulca pines, which can grow to over 45 meters, were grown from seed brought back to San Francisco by Breedlove in 1986.

His more than 72,000 sets of collections consisted of vascular plants, bryophytes, lichens, fungi, insects, snails, and reptiles. He collected seeds of plants from higher elevations in Chiapas and Oaxaca that led to the establishment of the New World Cloud Forest at the San Francisco Botanical Garden. Some of the species that he brought back from Chiapas for cultivation (e.g., Deppea splendens, Magnolia sharpii, Symplocos hartwegii, and S. tacanensis) are now either very rare or presumed extinct in the wild.

In 1968, a species of lizard Anolis breedlovei (junior synonym of Anolis cuprinus) was named in honor of Dennis Breedlove.

== Selected publications ==
=== Articles ===
- Berlin, B.; Breedlove, D. E.; Raven, P. H. (1966). "Folk Taxonomies and Biological Classification". Science. 154 (3746): 273–275. Bibcode:1966Sci...154..273B. doi:10.1126/science.154.3746.273. PMID 17810308. S2CID 35687186.
- Raven, Peter H.; Kyhos, Donald W.; Breedlove, Dennis E.; Payne, Willard W. (1968). "Polyploidy in Ambrosia dumosa (Compositae: Ambrosieae)". Brittonia. 20 (3): 205. Bibcode:1968Britt..20..205R. doi:10.2307/2805443. ISSN 0007-196X. JSTOR 2805443. S2CID 45526759.
- Breedlove, D. E.; Ehrlich, P. R. (1968). "Plant-Herbivore Coevolution: Lupines and Lycaenids". Science. 162 (3854): 671–672. Bibcode:1968Sci...162..671B. doi:10.1126/science.162.3854.671. PMID 17736044. S2CID 35240344.
- Breedlove, Dennis E.; Heckard, Lawrence R. (1970). "Gentrya, a New Genus of Scrophulariaceae from Mexico". Brittonia. 22 (1): 20. Bibcode:1970Britt..22...20B. doi:10.2307/2805718. ISSN 0007-196X. JSTOR 2805718. S2CID 186230885.
- Raven, P. H.; Berlin, B.; Breedlove, D. E. (1971). "The Origins of Taxonomy". Science. 174 (4015): 1210–1213. Bibcode:1971Sci...174.1210R. doi:10.1126/science.174.4015.1210. PMID 17806924. S2CID 52827153.
- Ehrlich, Paul R.; Breedlove, Dennis E.; Brussard, Peter F.; Sharp, Margaret A. (1972). "Weather and the "Regulation" of Subalpine Populations". Ecology. 53 (2): 243–247. Bibcode:1972Ecol...53..243E. doi:10.2307/1934077. JSTOR 1934077.
- Beattie, A. J.; Breedlove, D. E.; Ehrlich, P. R. (1973). "The Ecology of the Pollinators and Predators of Frasera Speciosa". Ecology. 54 (1): 81–91. Bibcode:1973Ecol...54...81B. doi:10.2307/1934376. JSTOR 1934376.
- Berlin, Brent; Breedlove, Dennis E.; Raven, Peter H. (1973). "General Principles of Classification and Nomenclature in Folk Biology". American Anthropologist. 75 (1): 214–242. Bibcode:1973AAnth..75..214B. doi:10.1525/aa.1973.75.1.02a00140.
- Berlin, E.A.; Jara A., V.M.; Berlin, B.; Breedlove, D.E.; Duncan, T.O.; Laughlin, R.M. (1993). "Me' winik: Discovery of the biomedical equivalence for a Maya ethnomedical syndrome". Social Science & Medicine. 37 (5): 671–678. doi:10.1016/0277-9536(93)90106-E. ISSN 0277-9536. PMID 8211281.
- Dolinger, Peter M.; Ehrlich, Paul R.; Fitch, William L.; Breedlove, Dennis E. (1973). "Alkaloid and Predation Patterns in Colorado Lupine Populations". Oecologia. 13 (3): 191–204. Bibcode:1973Oecol..13..191D. doi:10.1007/BF00360510. PMID 28308576. S2CID 23976476.

=== Books ===
- Breedlove, Dennis E.; Laughlin, Robert M. (1993). "Flowering of Man: A Tzotzil Botany of Zinacantán, Volume I". Smithsonian Contributions to Anthropology (35): 1–706. doi:10.5479/si.00810223.35.1.
- Breedlove, Dennis E.; Laughlin, Robert M. (1993). "Flowering of Man: A Tzotzil Botany of Zinacantán, Volume II". Smithsonian Contributions to Anthropology (35): 1–706. doi:10.5479/si.00810223.35.2. ISSN 0081-0223.
