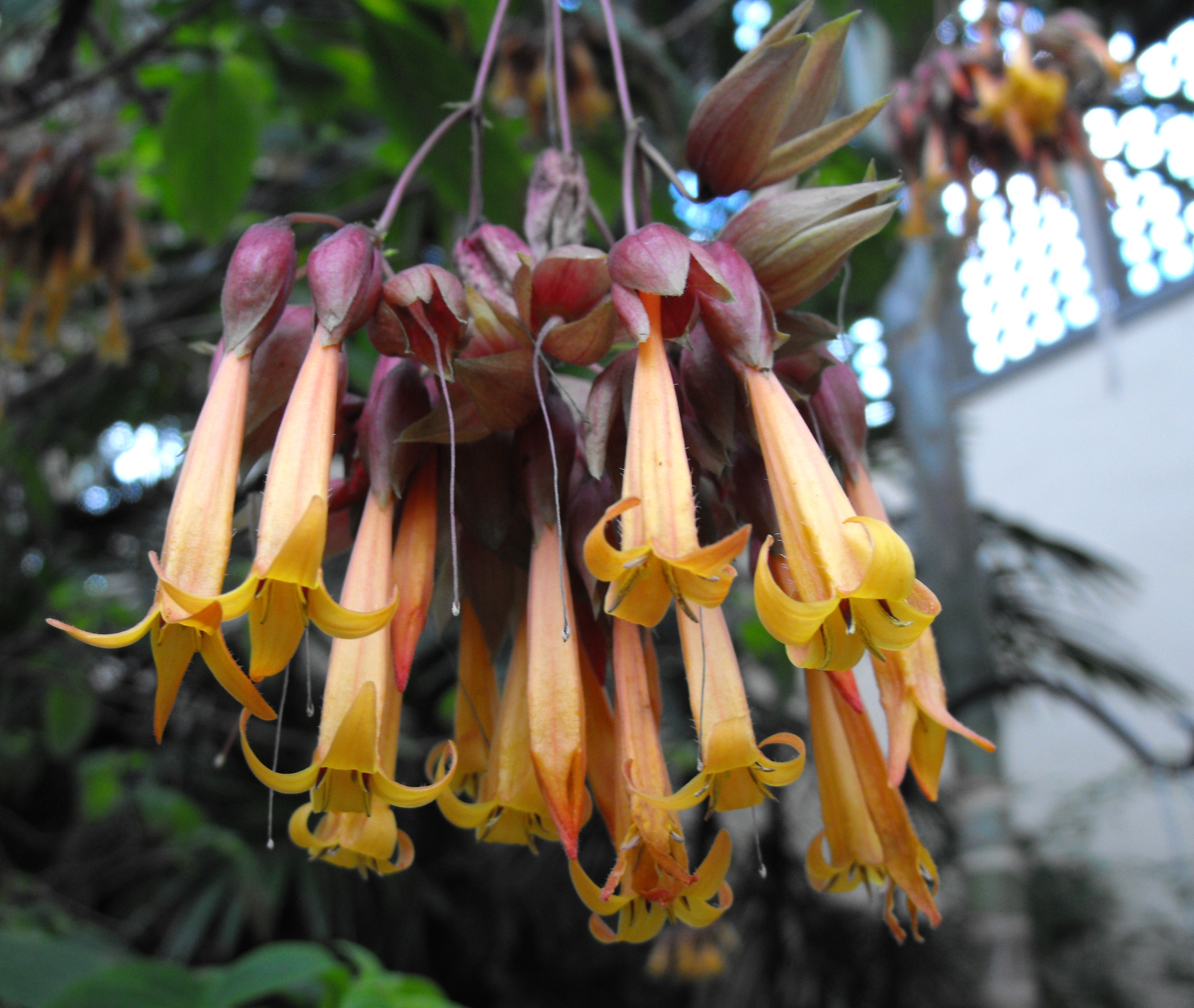
- Deppea splendens

Scientific classification
- Kingdom: Plantae
- Clade: Embryophytes
- Clade: Tracheophytes
- Clade: Spermatophytes
- Clade: Angiosperms
- Clade: Eudicots
- Clade: Asterids
- Order: Gentianales
- Family: Rubiaceae
- Subfamily: Cinchonoideae
- Tribe: Hamelieae
- Genus: Deppea; Schltdl. & Cham.

Type species
- Deppea erythrorhiza Schltdl. & Cham.

Species
- See here

Synonyms
- Bellizinca Borhidi; Choristes Benth.; Csapodya Borhidi; Deppeopsis Borhidi & Strancz.; Edithea Standl.; Schenckia K.Schum.

= Deppea =

Genus of plants

Deppea is a genus of flowering plants in the family Rubiaceae native to the region from Mexico to Central America, and from Brazil to Argentina.

== Description ==
Deppea are slender shrubs or small trees with oppositely arranged, or rarely whorled leaves.

=== Cytology ===
The chromosome count of Deppea blumenaviensis is 2n = 28.

== Taxonomy ==
The genus is named in honor of Ferdinand Deppe (1794-1861), who collected the type species during a botanical expedition to Veracruz, Mexico with C.J.W. Schiede in 1828-1829. It was described by Diederich Franz Leonhard von Schlechtendal and Adelbert von Chamisso in 1830 with Deppea erythrorhiza Schltdl. & Cham. as the type species. Within the subfamily Dialypetalanthoideae it is placed in the tribe Hamelieae.

=== Species ===
- Deppea amaranthina Standl. & Steyerm.
- Deppea amaranthoides Borhidi
- Deppea anisophylla L.O.Williams
- Deppea arachnipoda (Borhidi & Salas-Mor.) Borhidi
- Deppea blumenaviensis (K.Schum.) Lorence
- Deppea cornifolia (Benth.) Benth.
- Deppea densiflora Borhidi & Reyes-Garcia
- Deppea ehrenbergii Standl.
- Deppea erythrorhiza Schltdl. & Cham.
- Deppea foliosa Borhidi, Salas-Mor. & E.Martinez
- Deppea grandiflora Schltdl.
- Deppea guerrerensis Dwyer & Lorence
- Deppea hamelioides Standl.
- Deppea hernandezii Lorence
- Deppea hintonii Bullock
- Deppea hoffmannioides Borhidi
- Deppea inaequalis Standl. & Steyerm.
- Deppea keniae Borhidi & Saynes
- Deppea longifolia Borhidi
- Deppea martinez-calderonii Lorence
- Deppea microphylla Greenm.
- Deppea nitida Borhidi & Salas-Mor.
- Deppea oaxacana Lorence
- Deppea obtusiflora (Benth.) Benth.
- Deppea pauciflora Borhidi & E.Martinez
- Deppea pubescens Hemsl.
- Deppea purpurascens Lorence
- Deppea purpusii Standl.
- Deppea rubrinervis Borhidi
- Deppea rupicola Borhidi
- Deppea serboi Borhidi & K.Velasco
- Deppea sousae Borhidi
- Deppea splendens Breedlove
- Deppea tenuiflora Benth.
- Deppea tubaeana Borhidi
- Deppea umbellata Hemsl.

== Distribution and habitat ==
It occurs in Argentina, Brazil, Costa Rica, El Salvador, Guatemala, Honduras, Mexico, and Panama. The centre of diversity is in the mountains of Mexico and Guatemala.
