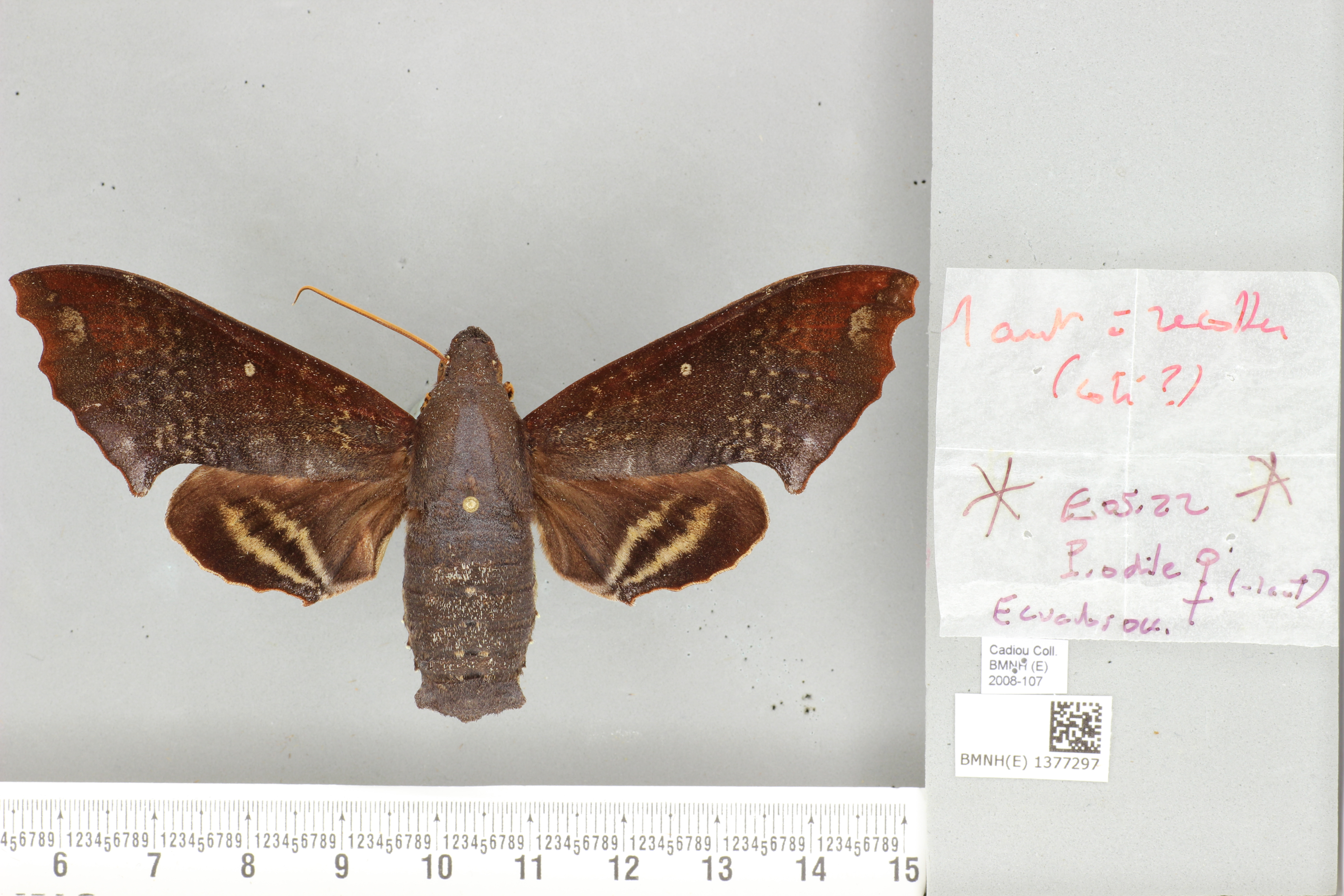

Scientific classification
- Kingdom: Animalia
- Phylum: Arthropoda
- Class: Insecta
- Order: Lepidoptera
- Family: Sphingidae
- Genus: Pachygonidia
- Species: P. odile

Binomial name
- Pachygonidia odile Eitschberger & Haxaire, 2002

= Pachygonidia odile =

Species of moth

Pachygonidia odile is a moth of the family Sphingidae which is endemic to Ecuador.

The wingspan is 65 millimetres (2.6 in) for males and 69 millimetres (2.7 in) for females.

There are probably multiple generations per year.
