= Hoffmannia ecuatoriana =

Conservation status
- Endangered (IUCN 3.1)

Scientific classification
- Kingdom: Plantae
- Clade: Embryophytes
- Clade: Tracheophytes
- Clade: Spermatophytes
- Clade: Angiosperms
- Clade: Eudicots
- Clade: Asterids
- Order: Gentianales
- Family: Rubiaceae
- Genus: Hoffmannia
- Species: H. ecuatoriana

Binomial name
- Hoffmannia ecuatoriana Standl.

Species of plant

Hoffmannia ecuatoriana is a species of flowering plant in the family Rubiaceae. It is endemic to Ecuador. It is known from just a single collection made in 1944.
