= Hamelia papillosa =

Conservation status
- Vulnerable (IUCN 2.3)

Scientific classification
- Kingdom: Plantae
- Clade: Tracheophytes
- Clade: Angiosperms
- Clade: Eudicots
- Clade: Asterids
- Order: Gentianales
- Family: Rubiaceae
- Genus: Hamelia
- Species: H. papillosa

Binomial name
- Hamelia papillosa Urb.

Species of plant

Hamelia papillosa is a species of flowering plant in the coffee family, Rubiaceae, that is endemic to Jamaica.
