= Anolis cuprinus =

Conservation status
- Least Concern (IUCN 3.1)

Scientific classification
- Kingdom: Animalia
- Phylum: Chordata
- Class: Reptilia
- Order: Squamata
- Suborder: Iguania
- Family: Dactyloidae
- Genus: Anolis
- Species: A. cuprinus

Binomial name
- Anolis cuprinus H.M. Smith, 1964

Synonyms
- Anolis cuprinus H.M. Smith, 1964; Anolis breedlovei H.M. Smith & Paulson, 1968; Norops cuprinus — Guyer & Savage, 1986; Anolis cuprinus — Liner, 2007

Species of lizard

Anolis cuprinus, also known commonly as the copper anole, the Chiapas anole, and el abaniquillo de Chiapas in Spanish, is a species of lizard in the family Dactyloidae. The species is endemic to Mexico.

== Geographic range ==
A. cuprinus is found in southeastern Mexico, in the Mexican states of Chiapas and Oaxaca.

== Habitat ==
The preferred natural habitat of A. cuprinus is montane cloud forest, but the species has also been found in coffee plantations.

== Description ==
A cuprinus may attain a snout-to-vent length (SVL) of 5.3 cm (2.1 in), with a tail length of 11.2 cm (4.4 in). The dewlap is bright red, and reaches mid-thorax. The interparietal scale is distinctly smaller than the ear opening.

== Reproduction ==
A. cuprinus is oviparous.

== Etymology ==
The synonym, A. breedlovei, was named in honor of American botanist Dennis Eugene Breedlove.
