= Hoffmannia modesta =

Conservation status
- Data Deficient (IUCN 3.1)

Scientific classification
- Kingdom: Plantae
- Clade: Tracheophytes
- Clade: Angiosperms
- Clade: Eudicots
- Clade: Asterids
- Order: Gentianales
- Family: Rubiaceae
- Genus: Hoffmannia
- Species: H. modesta

Binomial name
- Hoffmannia modesta Diels

Species of plant

Hoffmannia modesta is a species of plant in the family Rubiaceae. It is endemic to Ecuador.
