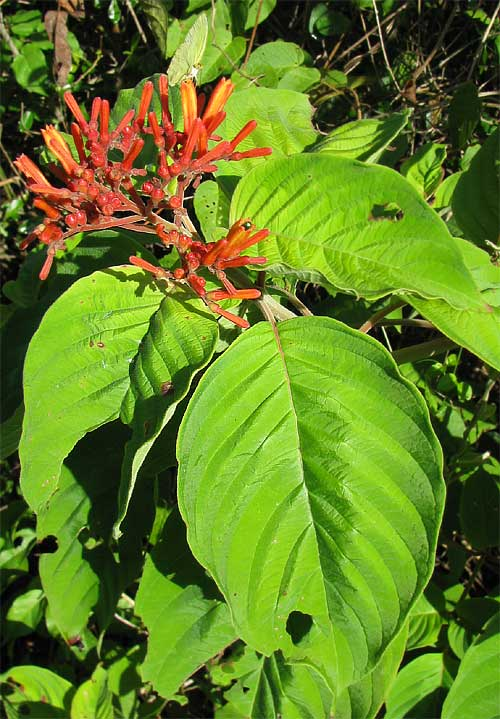
- Firebush (H. patens)

Scientific classification
- Kingdom: Plantae
- Clade: Tracheophytes
- Clade: Angiosperms
- Clade: Eudicots
- Clade: Asterids
- Order: Gentianales
- Family: Rubiaceae
- Subfamily: Cinchonoideae
- Tribe: Hamelieae
- Genus: Hamelia; Jacq.

Type species
- Hamelia erecta Jacq.

Species
- Several, see text

Synonyms
- Duhamelia Pers. Jangaraca Raf. Tangaraca Adans. Tapesia C.F.Gaertn.

= Hamelia =

Genus of plants

Hamelia is a genus of flowering plants in the coffee family, Rubiaceae. The name honors French botanist Henri-Louis Duhamel du Monceau (1700–1782).

== Selected species ==
- Hamelia axillaris Sw. – Guayabo Negro
- Hamelia cuprea Griseb.
- Hamelia macrantha Little
- Hamelia papillosa Urb. (Jamaica)
- Hamelia patens Jacq. – Firebush (American tropics and subtropics)
  - Hamelia patens var. glabra Oerst.
  - Hamelia patens var. patens
