= Omiltemia =

Scientific classification
- Kingdom: Plantae
- Clade: Tracheophytes
- Clade: Angiosperms
- Clade: Eudicots
- Clade: Asterids
- Order: Gentianales
- Family: Rubiaceae
- Genus: Omiltemia; Standl.

Genus of plants

Omiltemia is a genus of flowering plants belonging to the family Rubiaceae.

Its native range is Southwestern Mexico.

== Species ==
Species:

- Omiltemia guerrerensis Lozada-Pérez & J.Rojas
- Omiltemia longipes Standl.
- Omiltemia parvifolia Borhidi & K.Velasco
