= Robert M. Laughlin =

American anthropologist and linguist (1934–2020)

Robert Moody Laughlin (May 29, 1934 – May 28, 2020) was an American anthropologist and linguist. He was a curator at the Smithsonian Institution.

== Work ==
Laughlin's research focused on the indigenous Maya peoples of Chiapas, Mexico and the Tzotzil language. In 1975, he published The Great Tzotzil Dictionary of San Lorenzo Zinacantán, containing 30,000 entries. He also published works on other aspects of Tzotzil culture, such as folktales and ethnobotany, and helped to found a local writer's cooperative, Sna Jtz'ibajom, and a theatre troupe. His work is credited with helping to standardize how the Tzotzil language is written and with reviving interest in indigenous languages in the region.

== Death ==
Laughlin died from COVID-19 in Arlington, Virginia, one day short from his 86th birthday, during the COVID-19 pandemic in Virginia.
