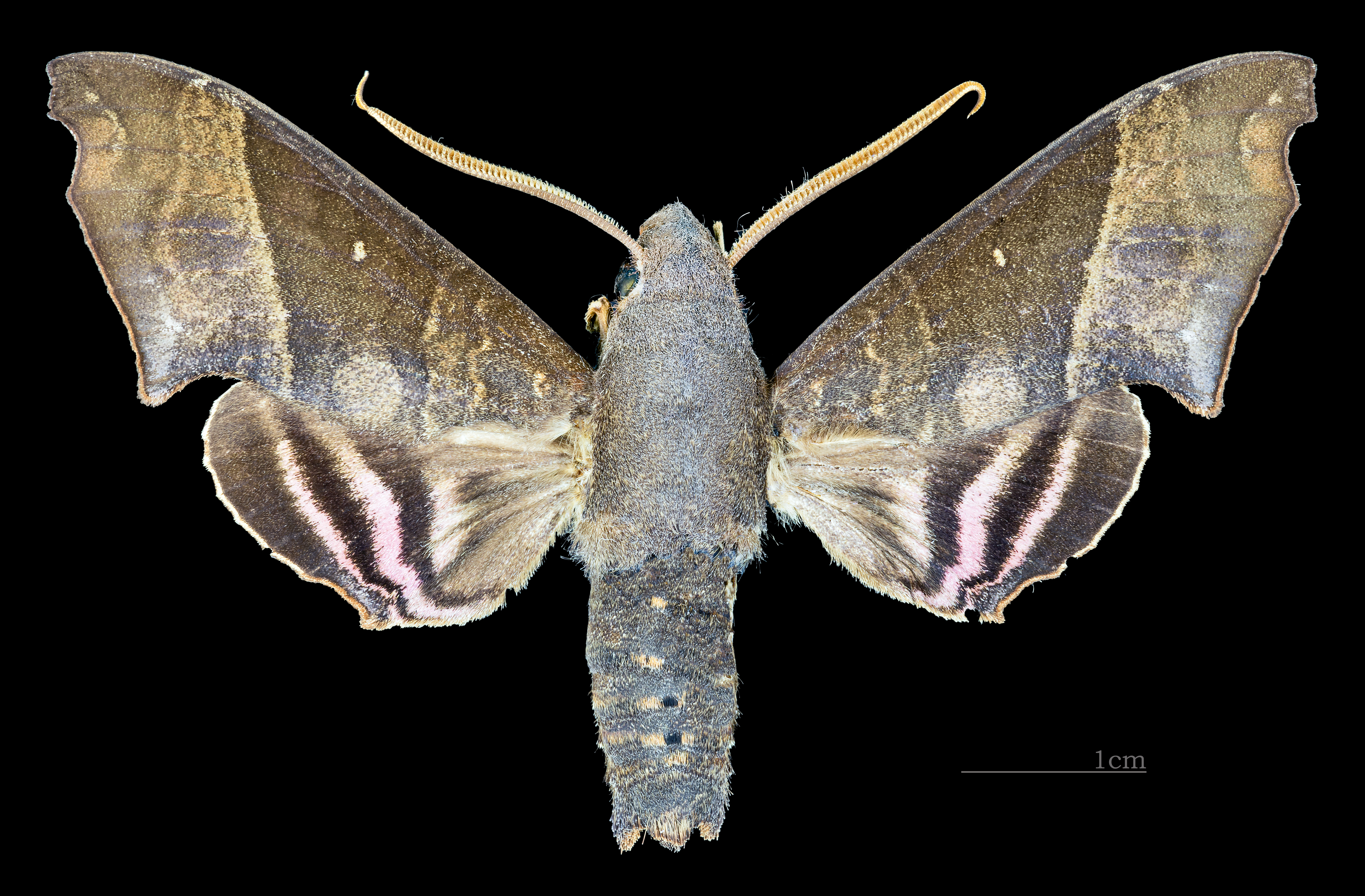
- Male dorsal
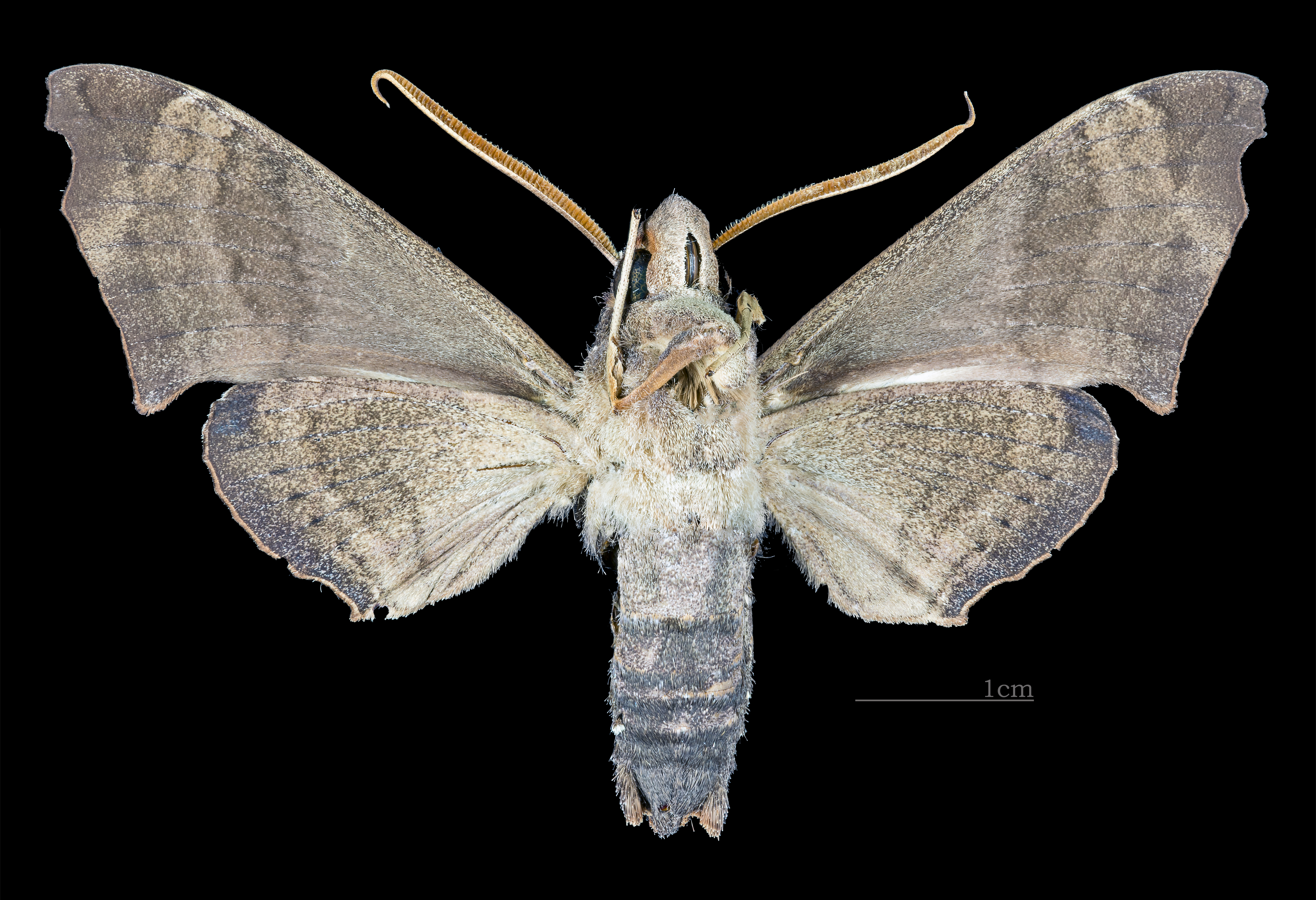
- Male ventral

Scientific classification
- Domain: Eukaryota
- Kingdom: Animalia
- Phylum: Arthropoda
- Class: Insecta
- Order: Lepidoptera
- Family: Sphingidae
- Genus: Pachygonidia
- Species: P. hopfferi

Binomial name
- Pachygonidia hopfferi (Staudinger, 1875)

Synonyms
- Pachygonia hopfferi Staudinger, 1876

= Pachygonidia hopfferi =

Species of moth

Pachygonidia hopfferi is a moth of the family Sphingidae.

== Distribution ==
It is known from Panama and Costa Rica and has been recorded as far south as Bolivia.

== Description ==
The wingspan is about 74 mm.

== Biology ==
There are probably multiple generations per year.

The larvae probably feed on Doliocarpus dentatus, Doliocarpus multiflorus and Tetracera hydrophila.
