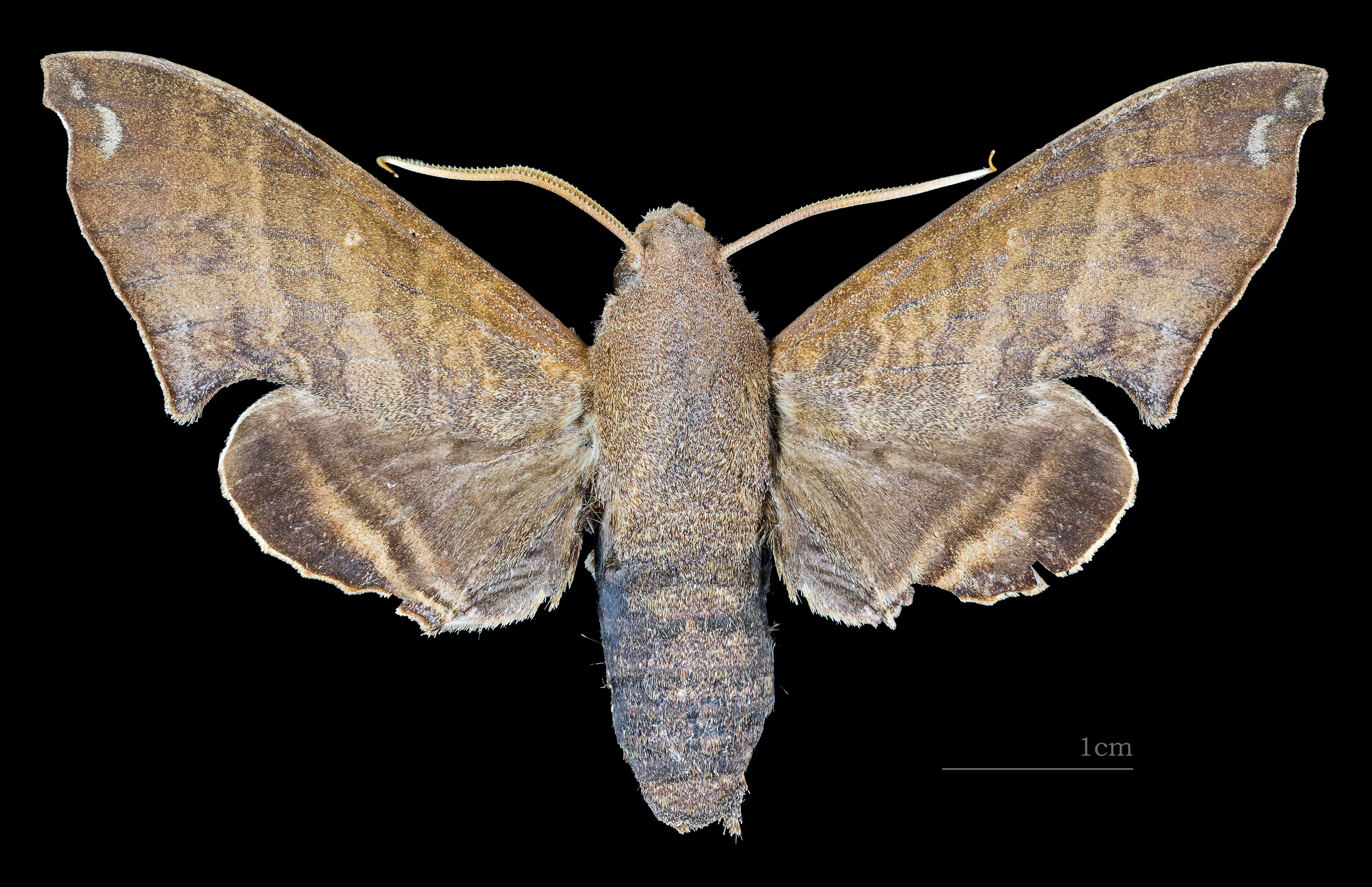
- Pachygonidia subhamata female dorsal
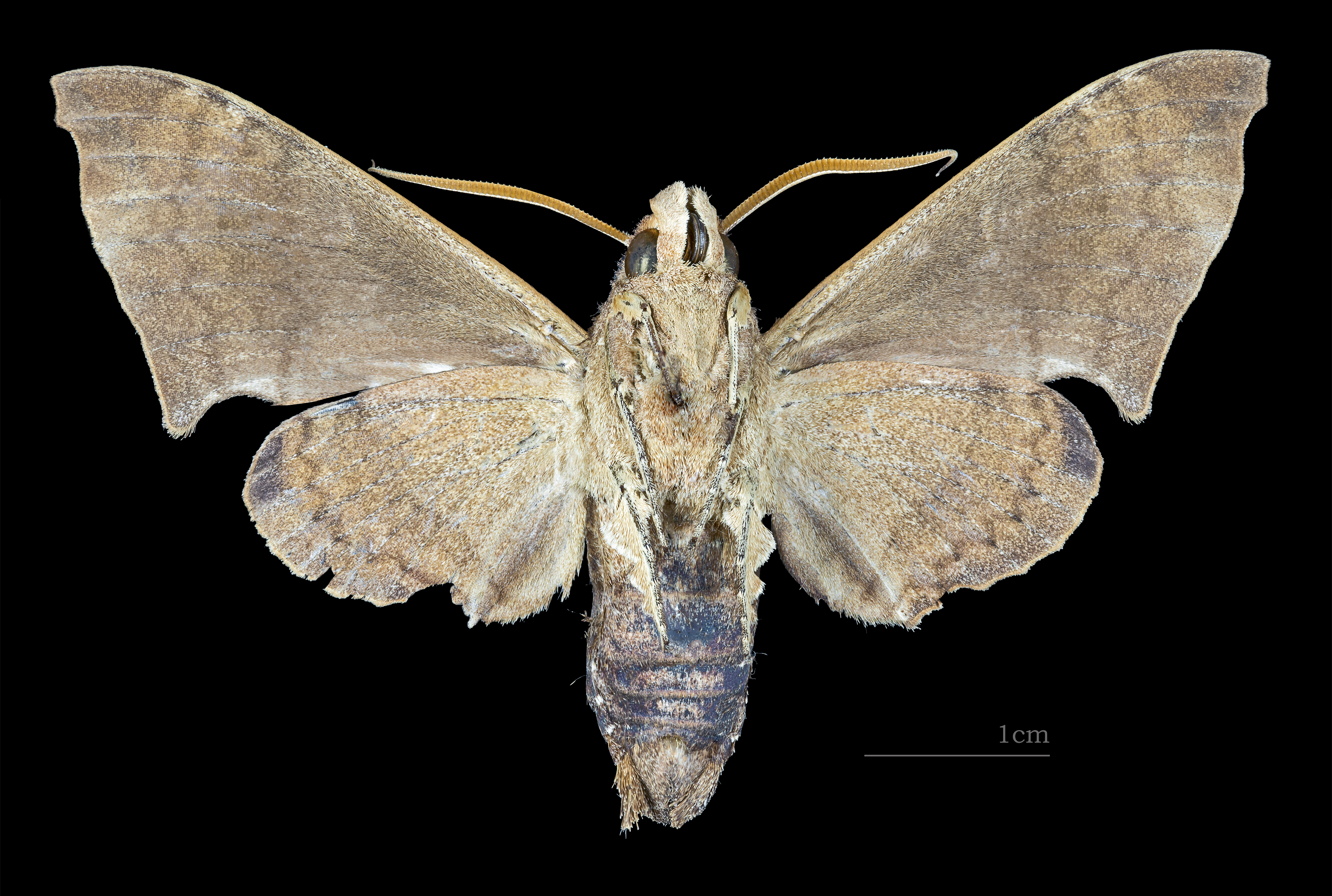
- Pachygonidia subhamata female ventral

Scientific classification
- Domain: Eukaryota
- Kingdom: Animalia
- Phylum: Arthropoda
- Class: Insecta
- Order: Lepidoptera
- Family: Sphingidae
- Genus: Pachygonidia
- Species: P. subhamata

Binomial name
- Pachygonidia subhamata (Walker, 1856)

Synonyms
- Perigonia subhamata Walker, 1856; Macroglossa gigantea Schaufuss, 1870

= Pachygonidia subhamata =

Species of moth

Pachygonidia subhamata is a moth of the family Sphingidae.

== Distribution ==
It is found from Brazil, Venezuela and Ecuador north through Central America (Panama, Costa Rica, Nicaragua, Honduras, Guatemala, El Salvador and Belize) to Mexico.

== Description ==
The wingspan is 62–75 mm. There is a grey-brown submarginal patch on the forewing upperside and two median transverse pinkish-buff bands on the hindwing upperside. These band are more or less shaded with brown and the pink tint is mostly not prominent.

== Biology ==
There are probably multiple generations per year.

The larvae feed on Vitis tiliifolia.
