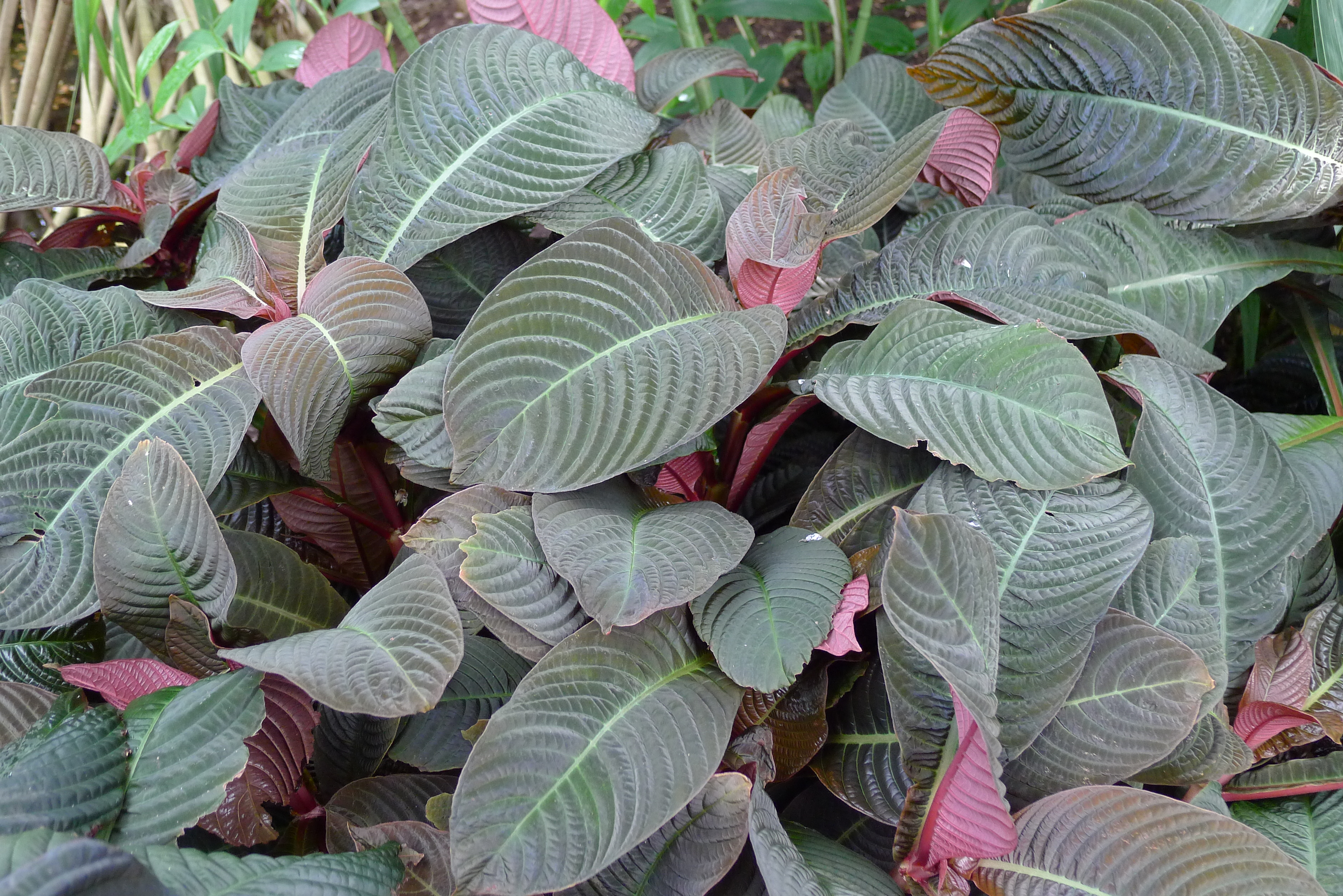
- Hoffmannia refulgens

Scientific classification
- Kingdom: Plantae
- Clade: Tracheophytes
- Clade: Angiosperms
- Clade: Eudicots
- Clade: Asterids
- Order: Gentianales
- Family: Rubiaceae
- Subfamily: Cinchonoideae
- Tribe: Hamelieae
- Genus: Hoffmannia; Sw.

Synonyms
- Erosmia A.Juss.; Euosmia Humb. & Bonpl.; Ohigginsia Ruiz & Pav.

= Hoffmannia =

Genus of plants

Hoffmannia is a genus of flowering plants in the family Rubiaceae. They are distributed in Mexico, Central America, and South America.

There are about 100 species.

Species include:

- Hoffmannia congesta – Costa Rica
- Hoffmannia discolor
- Hoffmannia ecuatoriana Standl. – endemic to Ecuador
- Hoffmannia excelsa (Kunth) K. Schum
- Hoffmannia ghiesbreghtii – Guatemala, southern Mexico
- Hoffmannia modesta Diels – endemic to Ecuador.
- Hoffmannia refulgens
- Hoffmannia regalis Hook.
- Hoffmannia roezlii

== Gallery ==
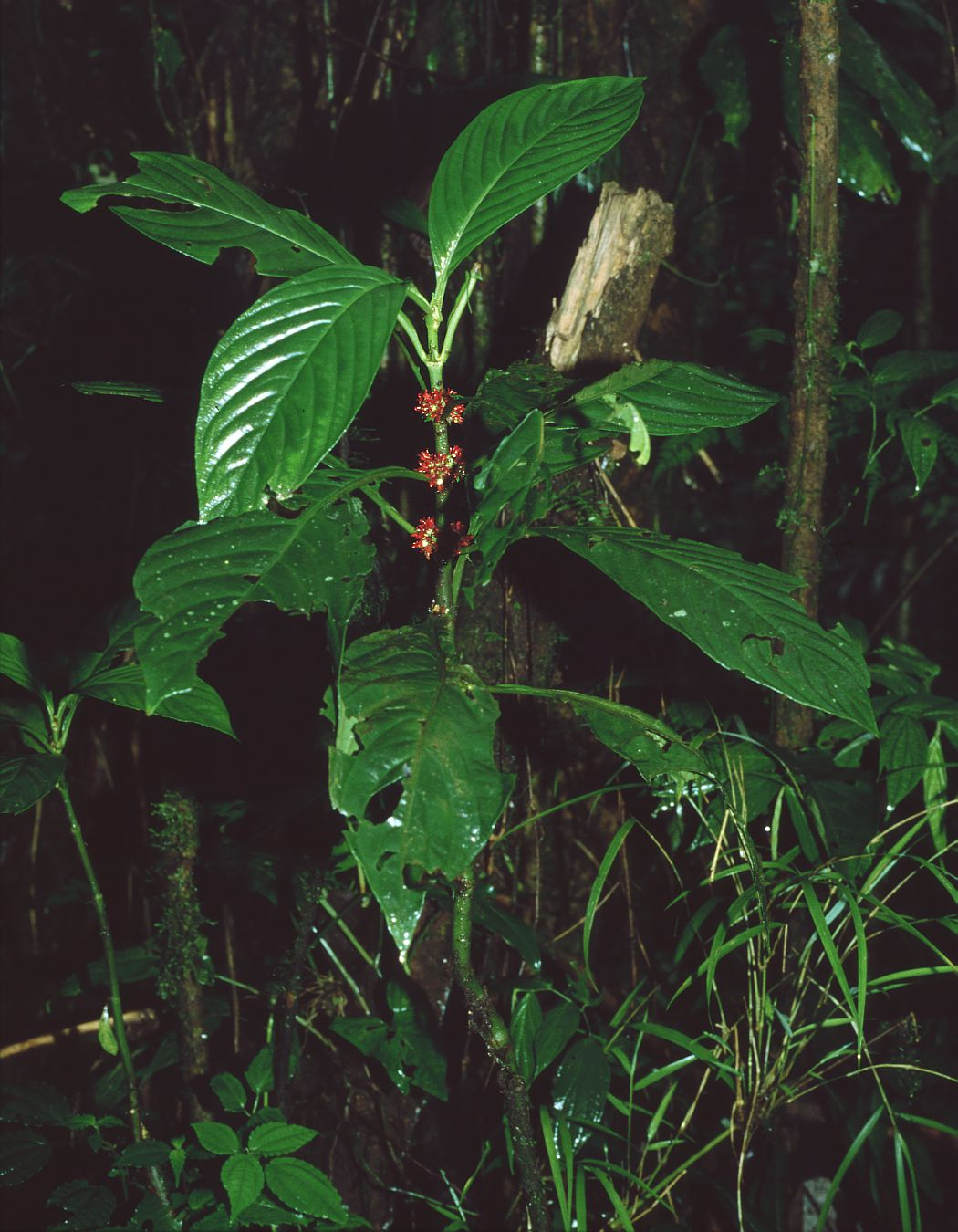
Hoffmannia congesta
Monteverde Cloud Forest Reserve, Costa Rica

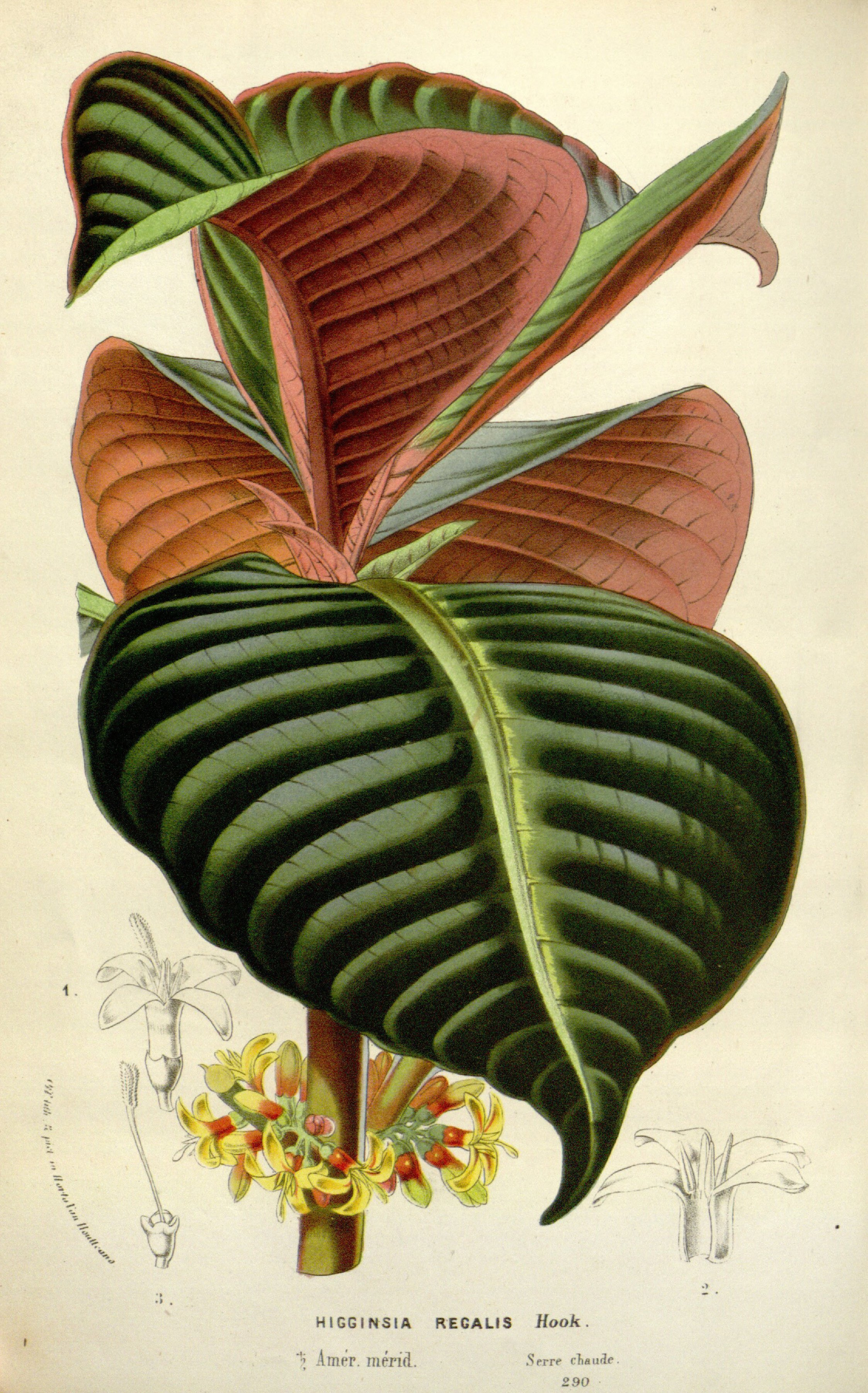
Hoffmannia regalis

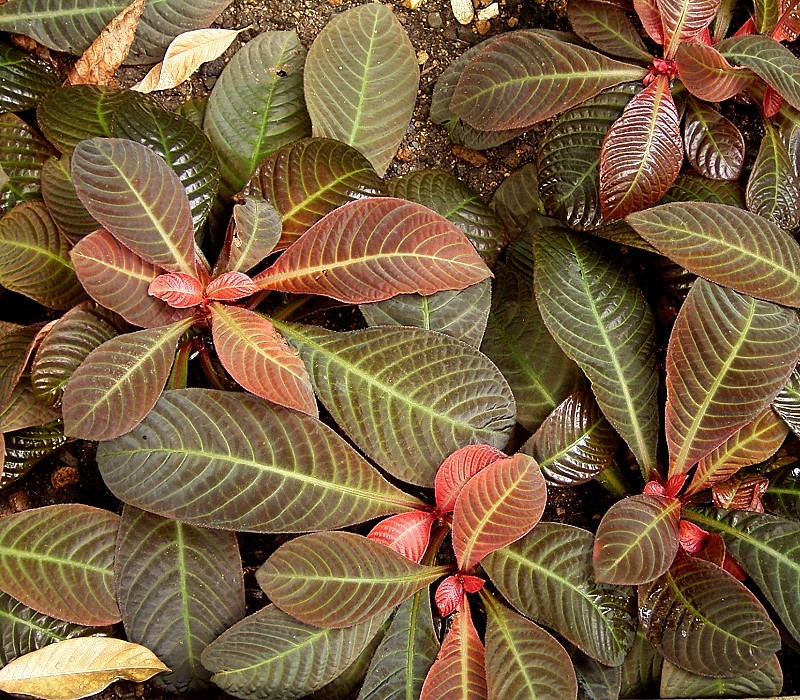
Hoffmannia refulgens
