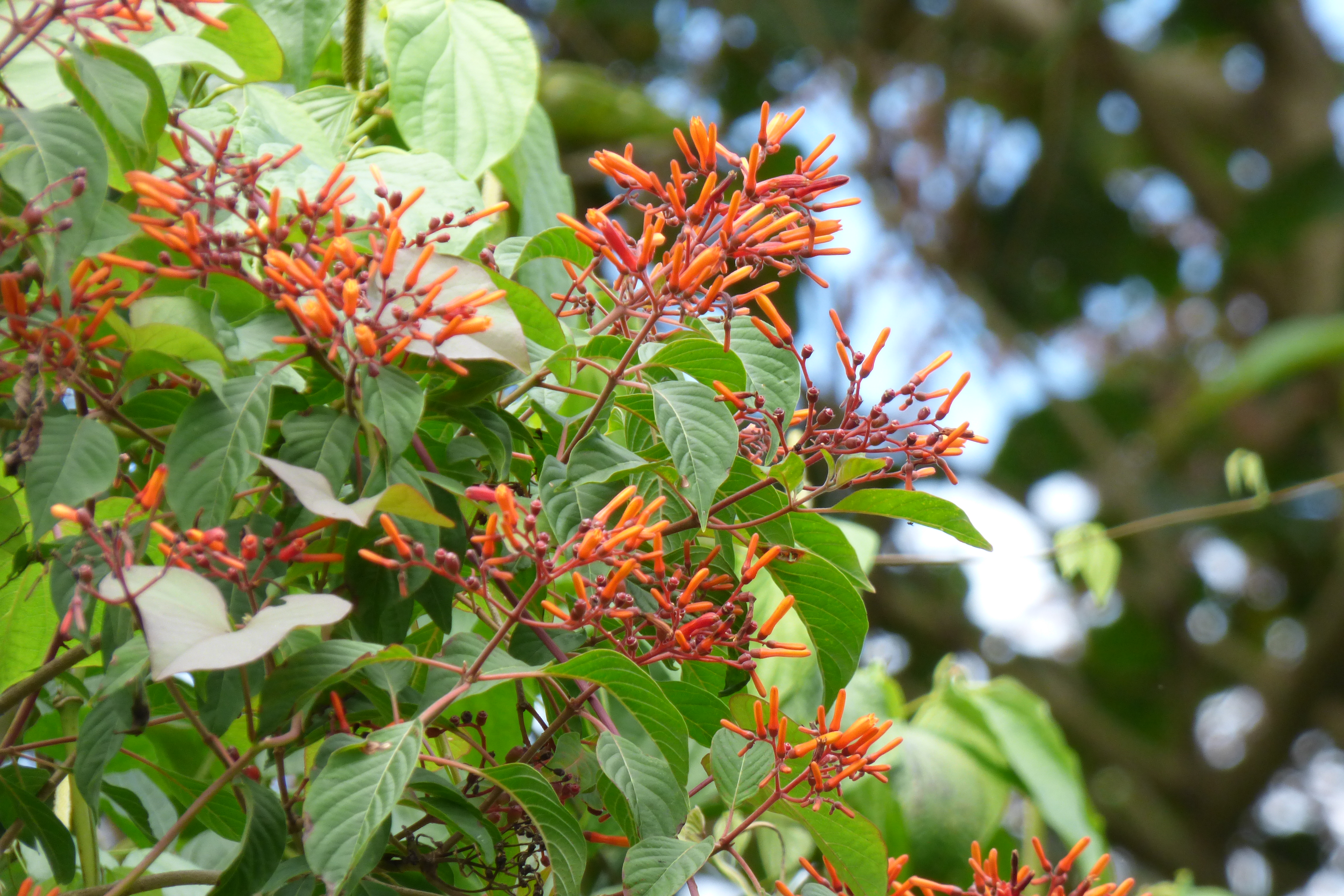
- Habitus

Conservation status
- Least Concern (IUCN 3.1)

- Secure (NatureServe)

Scientific classification
- Kingdom: Plantae
- Clade: Tracheophytes
- Clade: Angiosperms
- Clade: Eudicots
- Clade: Asterids
- Order: Gentianales
- Family: Rubiaceae
- Genus: Hamelia
- Species: H. patens

Binomial name
- Hamelia patens Jacq., 1763
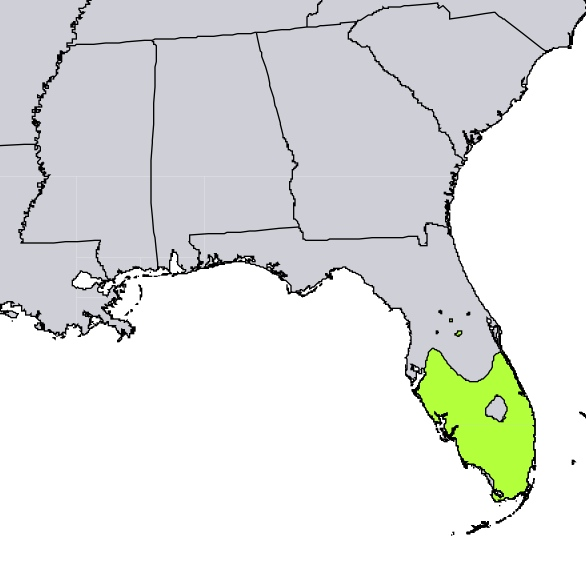
- Natural range in United States

Synonyms
- List: Duhamelia odorata Willd. ex Schult.; Duhamelia patens (Jacq.) Pers.; Duhamelia sphaerocarpa (Ruiz & Pav.) Pers.; Hamelia brachystemon Wernham; Hamelia brittoniana Wernham; Hamelia coccinea Sw.; Hamelia corymbosa Sessé & Moc.; Hamelia erecta Jacq.; Hamelia intermedia Urb. & Ekman; Hamelia lanuginosa M.Martens & Galeotti; Hamelia latifolia Rchb. ex DC.; Hamelia nodosa M.Martens & Galeotti; Hamelia pedicellata Wernham; Hamelia sphaerocarpa Ruiz & Pav.; Hamelia suaveolens Kunth; Hamelia tubiflora Wernham; Hamelia verticillata Moc. & Sessé ex DC.; Hamelia viridifolia Wernham; Schoenleinia thyrsoidea Miers

= Hamelia patens =

Species of flowering plant

Hamelia patens is a large evergreen perennial shrub or small tree in the family Rubiaceae, that is native to the American subtropics and tropics. Its range extends from Florida in the southern United States to as far south as Argentina. Common names include firebush, hummingbird bush, scarlet bush, and redhead. In Belize, this plant's Mayan name is Ix Canaan and is also known as "Guardian of the Forest".

== Growth ==
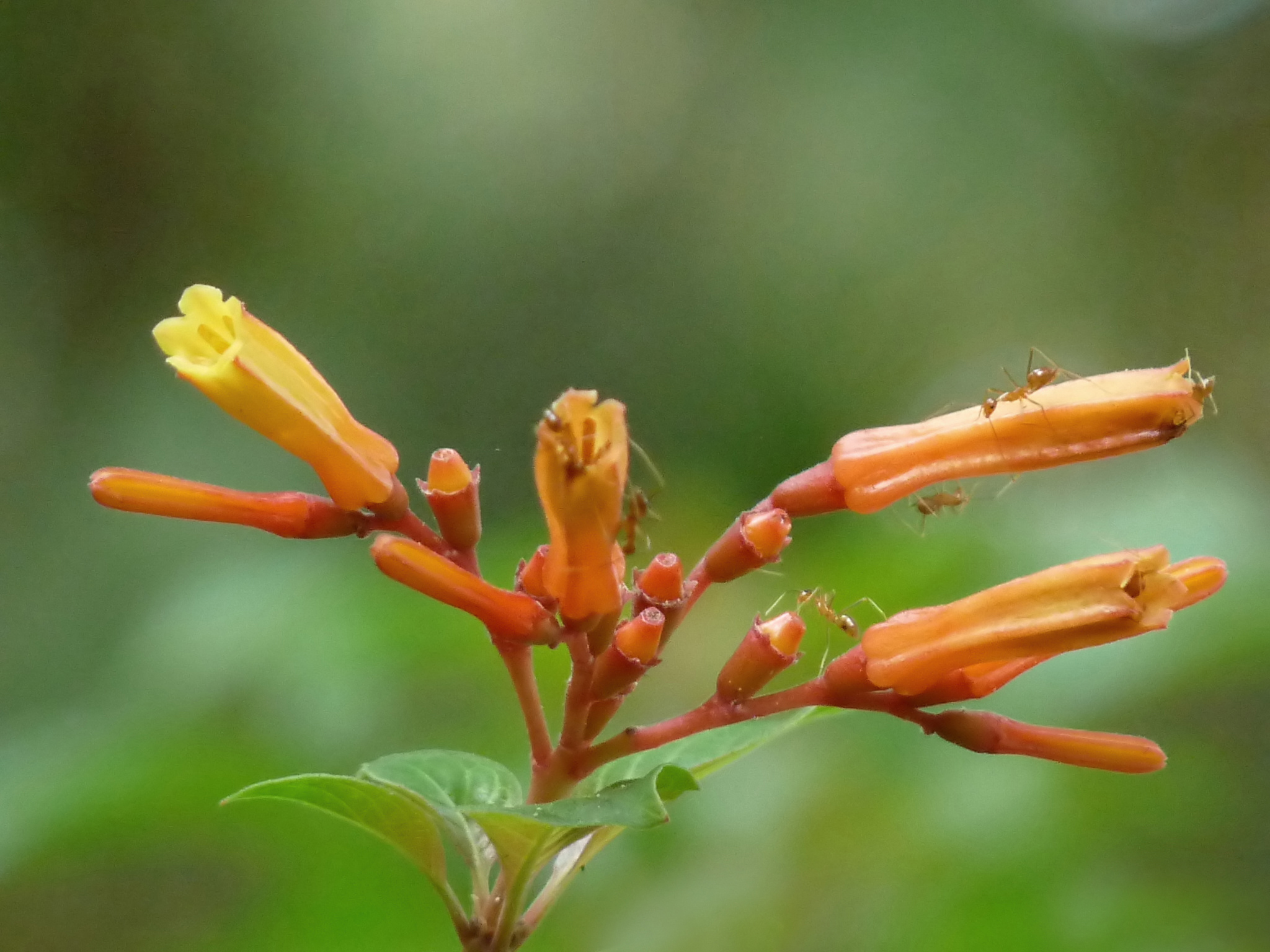
Inflorescence

Firebush has orangish-red tubular flowers, which recruit hummingbirds and butterflies for pollination. The corollas vary greatly in length, making them attractive to a wide range of pollinators. The fruit is a small dark red berry, turning black at maturity.

Young versus mature berries

Despite its somewhat scraggy appearance, this is a valuable garden tree in warmer climates and even in temperate ones, as long as the soil remains above freezing.

== Uses ==
Hummingbirds are attracted by its flowers and other birds feed on the fruit, both of which will also forage on small insects found in the vicinity, helping to keep down pests. These flowers are also fed on by butterflies, such as the statira sulphur (Aphrissa statira), which are attracted to red flowering plants. The fruits have a refreshing, acidic taste and are also edible by humans; in Mexico, they are made into a fermented drink.

=== Folk medicine ===
The plants are used in folk medicine for a range of ailments.

== Chemical constituents ==
A number of active compounds have been found in firebush, including maruquine, isomaruquine, pteropodine, isopteropodine, palmirine, rumberine, seneciophylline and stigmast-4-ene-3,6-dione. The bark contains significant amounts of tannins.

== Gallery ==
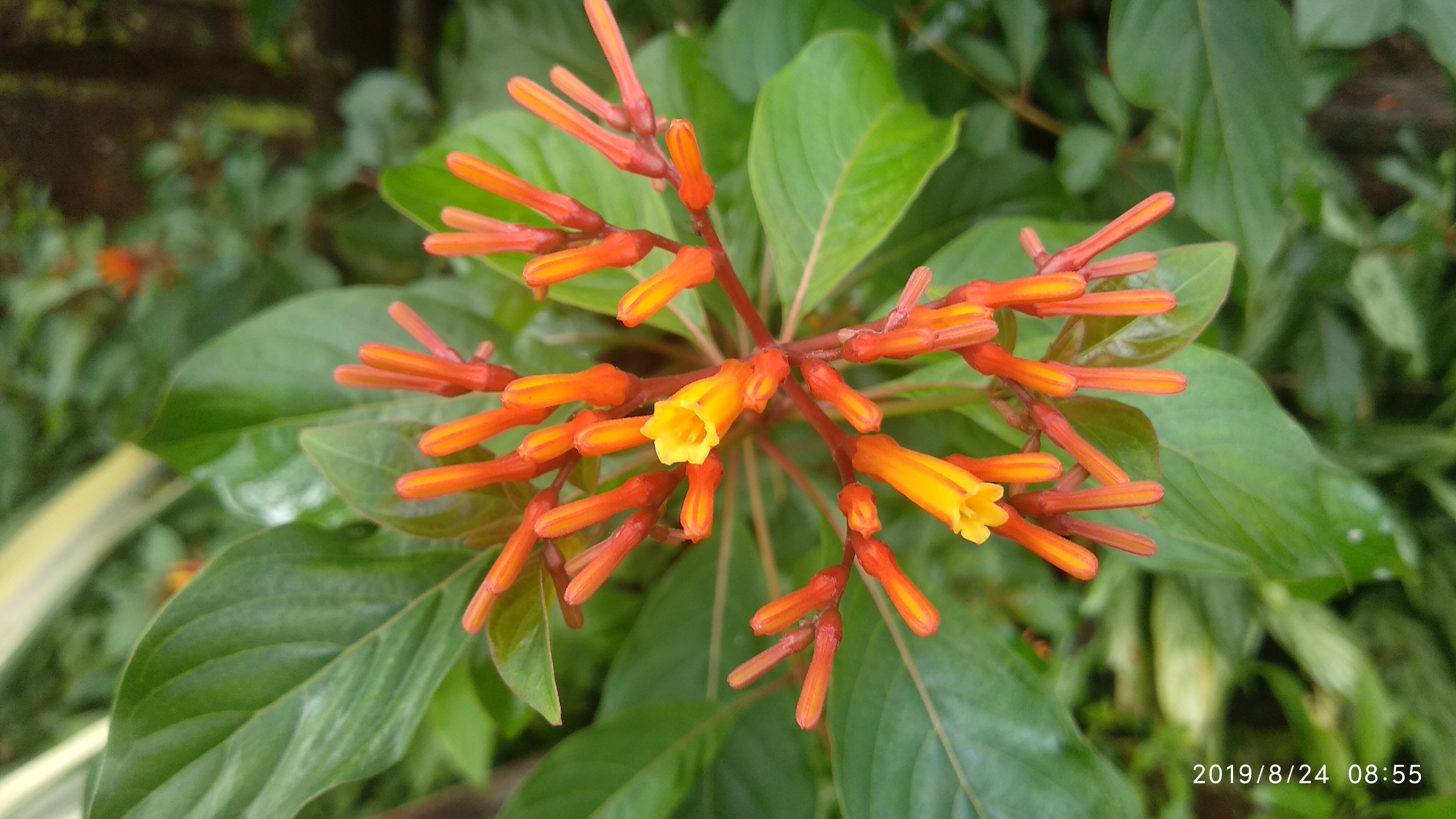
Inflorescence

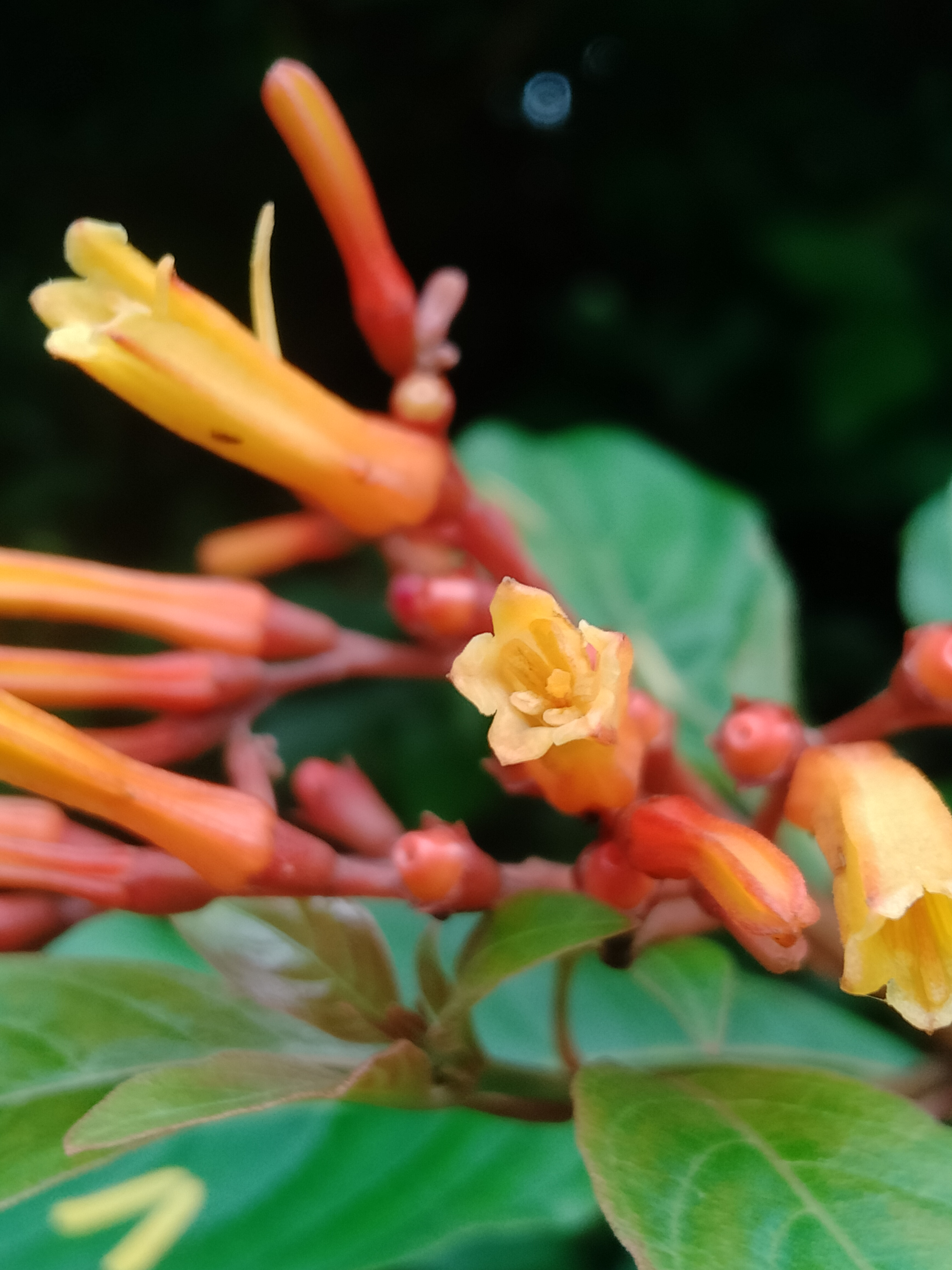
Flowers

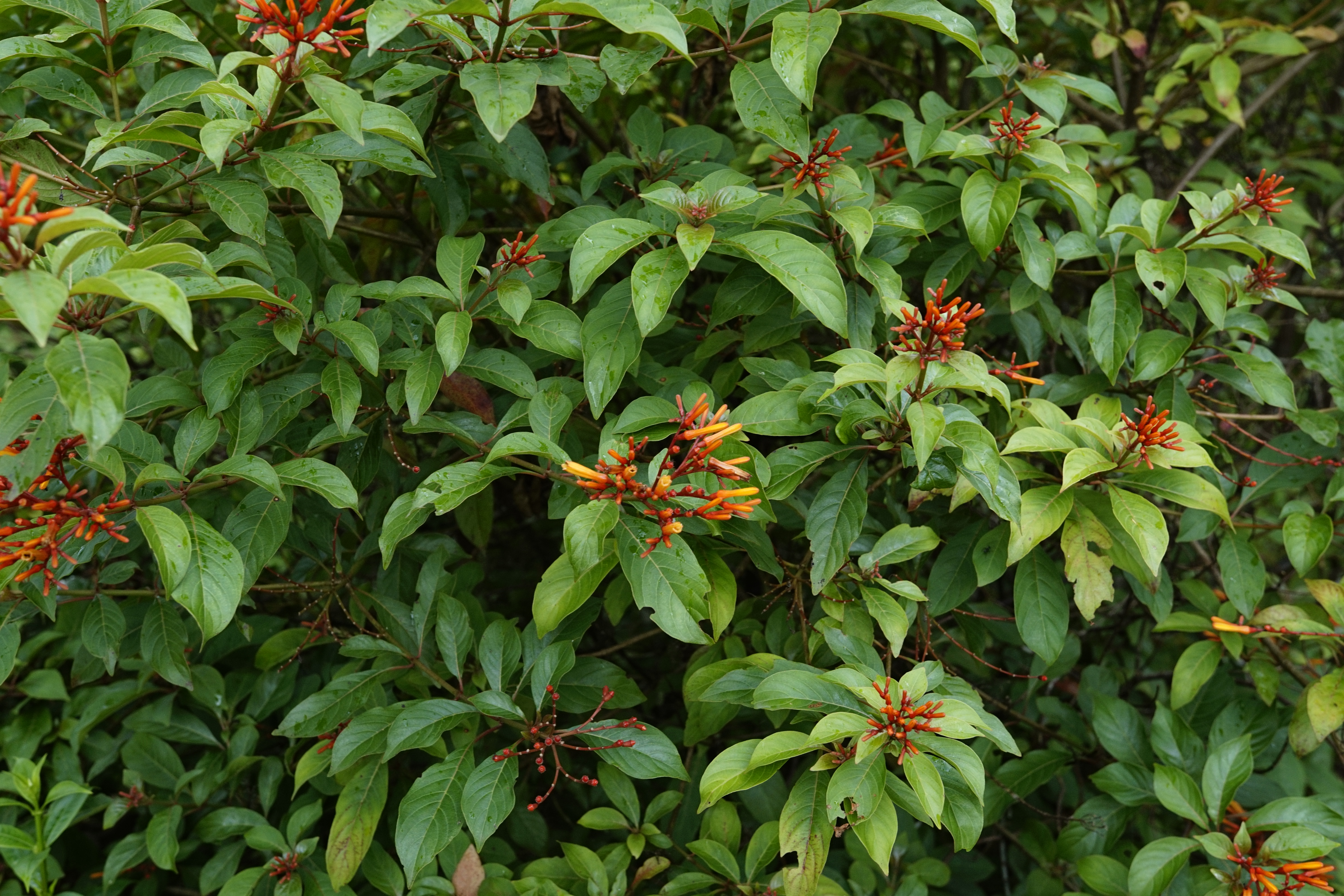
Foliage

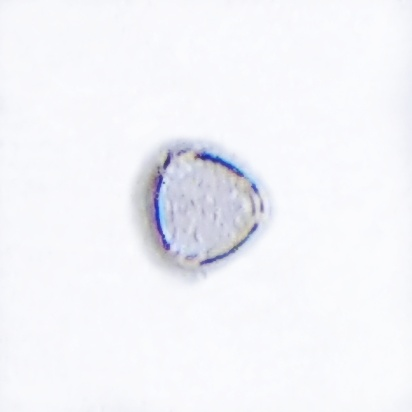
Pollen of Hamelia patens (Size: ~38 microns)
