= List of Pavetta species =

The following species in the flowering plant genus Pavetta are accepted by Plants of the World Online. An important distinguishing trait for the genus is the dark nodules on their leaves, which house bacterial endosymbionts.

- Pavetta abujuamii W.D.Hawth.
- Pavetta abyssinica Fresen.
- Pavetta aethiopica Bremek.
- Pavetta agrostiphylla Bremek.
- Pavetta akeassii J.B.Hall
- Pavetta amaniensis Bremek.
- Pavetta andongensis Hiern
- Pavetta angolensis Hiern
- Pavetta angustifolia (Lam.) Roem. & Schult.
- Pavetta ankasensis W.D.Hawth.
- Pavetta ankolensis Bridson
- Pavetta antennifera Wernham
- Pavetta arenicola K.Schum.
- Pavetta arenosa Lour.
- Pavetta aspera Craib
- Pavetta australiensis Bremek.
- Pavetta axillaris Bremek.
- Pavetta axillipara Bremek.
- Pavetta backeri Bremek.
- Pavetta baconiella Bremek.
- Pavetta bagshawei S.Moore
- Pavetta balinensis Bremek.
- Pavetta bangweensis Bremek.
- Pavetta barbata Sm.
- Pavetta barbertonensis Bremek.
- Pavetta barnesii Elmer ex Merr.
- Pavetta basilanensis Bremek.
- Pavetta batanensis Bremek.
- Pavetta batesiana Bremek.
- Pavetta bauchei Bremek.
- Pavetta bequaertii De Wild.
- Pavetta bidentata Hiern
- Pavetta bidgoodiae Bridson
- Pavetta bilineata Bremek.
- Pavetta blanda Bremek.
- Pavetta bomiensis W.D.Hawth.
- Pavetta bourdillonii Sivad. & N.Mohanan
- Pavetta bowkeri Harv.
- Pavetta brachyantha Merr.
- Pavetta brachycalyx Hiern
- Pavetta brachysiphon Bremek.
- Pavetta breviflora DC.
- Pavetta brevituba Craib
- Pavetta bridsoniae P.I.Forst.
- Pavetta brownii Bremek.
- Pavetta bruceana Bremek.
- Pavetta bruneelii De Wild.
- Pavetta brunonis Wall. ex G.Don
- Pavetta buchneri K.Schum.
- Pavetta burttii Bremek.
- Pavetta buruensis Bremek.
- Pavetta calothyrsa Bremek.
- Pavetta cambodiensis Bremek.
- Pavetta camerounensis S.D.Manning
- Pavetta candelabra Bremek.
- Pavetta canescens DC.
- Pavetta capensis (Houtt.) Bremek.
- Pavetta cataractarum S.Moore
- Pavetta catophylla K.Schum.
- Pavetta caudata Bremek.
- Pavetta celebica Bremek.
- Pavetta cellulosa Bremek.
- Pavetta chapmanii Bridson
- Pavetta chevalieri Bremek.
- Pavetta cinerascens (A.Rich.) Chiov.
- Pavetta cinereifolia Berhaut
- Pavetta claessensii De Wild.
- Pavetta coelophlebia Bremek.
- Pavetta comostyla S.Moore
- Pavetta condorensis Bremek.
- Pavetta conferta S.T.Reynolds
- Pavetta constipulata Bremek.
- Pavetta cooperi Harv. & Sond.
- Pavetta coronifera Bremek.
- Pavetta corymbosa (DC.) F.N.Williams
- Pavetta crassicaulis Bremek.
- Pavetta crassipes K.Schum.
- Pavetta crebrifolia Hiern
- Pavetta crystalensis S.E.Dawson
- Pavetta cumingii Bremek.
- Pavetta curalicola J.E.Burrows
- Pavetta decumbens K.Schum. & K.Krause
- Pavetta delicatifolia Bridson
- Pavetta dianeae J.E.Burrows & S.M.Burrows
- Pavetta diversicalyx Bridson
- Pavetta diversipunctata Bridson
- Pavetta dolichantha Bremek.
- Pavetta dolichosepala Hiern
- Pavetta dolichostyla Merr.
- Pavetta edentula Sond.
- Pavetta elliottii K.Schum. & K.Krause
- Pavetta elmeri Merr.
- Pavetta erlangeri Bremek.
- Pavetta eylesii S.Moore
- Pavetta fascifolia Bremek.
- Pavetta filistipulata Bremek.
- Pavetta fruticosa Craib
- Pavetta gabonica Bremek.
- Pavetta galpinii Bremek.
- Pavetta gardeniifolia Hochst. ex A.Rich.
- Pavetta gardneri Bremek.
- Pavetta genipifolia Schumach.
- Pavetta geoffrayi Bremek.
- Pavetta gerstneri Bremek.
- Pavetta glaucophylla Retief, S.J.Siebert & A.E.van Wyk
- Pavetta gleniei Thwaites ex Hook.f.
- Pavetta globularis Bremek.
- Pavetta glomerata Bremek.
- Pavetta gorontalensis Bremek.
- Pavetta gossweileri Bremek.
- Pavetta graciliflora Wall. ex Ridl.
- Pavetta gracilifolia Bremek.
- Pavetta gracilipes Hiern
- Pavetta gracillima S.Moore
- Pavetta granitica F.Muell. ex Bremek.
- Pavetta greenwayi Bremek.
- Pavetta grossissima S.D.Manning
- Pavetta grumosa S.Moore
- Pavetta gurueensis Bridson
- Pavetta haareri Bremek.
- Pavetta harborii S.Moore
- Pavetta herbacea Bremek.
- Pavetta hispida Hiern
- Pavetta hispidula Wight & Arn.
- Pavetta hohenackeri Bremek.
- Pavetta holstii K.Schum.
- Pavetta hongkongensis Bremek.
- Pavetta hookeriana Hiern
- Pavetta humilis Hook.f.
- Pavetta hymenophylla Bremek.
- Pavetta inandensis Bremek.
- Pavetta incana Klotzsch
- Pavetta indica L.
- Pavetta indigotica Bridson
- Pavetta intermedia Bremek.
- Pavetta involucrata Thwaites
- Pavetta ixorifolia Bremek.
- Pavetta johnstonii Bremek.
- Pavetta kasaica Bremek.
- Pavetta kedahica Bremek.
- Pavetta kimberleyana S.T.Reynolds
- Pavetta klotzschiana K.Schum.
- Pavetta kotzei Bremek.
- Pavetta kribiensis S.D.Manning
- Pavetta kupensis S.D.Manning
- Pavetta kyimbilensis Bremek.
- Pavetta laevifolia Valeton
- Pavetta lampongensis Bremek.
- Pavetta lanceolata Eckl.
- Pavetta lasiobractea K.Schum.
- Pavetta lasiocalyx Bremek.
- Pavetta lasioclada (K.Krause) Mildbr. ex Bremek.
- Pavetta lasiopeplus K.Schum.
- Pavetta laurentii De Wild.
- Pavetta laxa S.D.Manning
- Pavetta leonensis Keay
- Pavetta lescrauwaetii De Wild.
- Pavetta leytensis Bremek.
- Pavetta lindina Bremek.
- Pavetta linearifolia Bremek.
- Pavetta loandensis (S.Moore) Bremek.
- Pavetta lomamiensis Bremek.
- Pavetta longibrachiata Bremek.
- Pavetta longiflora Vahl
- Pavetta longistyla S.D.Manning
- Pavetta lulandoensis Bridson
- Pavetta lutambensis Mildbr. ex Bremek.
- Pavetta luzonica Bremek.
- Pavetta lynesii Bridson
- Pavetta macraei Bremek.
- Pavetta macropoda Bremek.
- Pavetta macrosepala Hiern
- Pavetta madrassica Bremek.
- Pavetta makassarica Bremek.
- Pavetta malchairii De Wild.
- Pavetta manyanguensis Bridson
- Pavetta matumbiensis Bridson
- Pavetta mayumbensis R.D.Good
- Pavetta mazumbaiensis Bridson
- Pavetta melanochroa Bremek.
- Pavetta membranacea Blanco
- Pavetta membranifolia K.Krause
- Pavetta micheliana J.-G.Adam
- Pavetta micrantha Bremek.
- Pavetta microphylla Chiov.
- Pavetta micropunctata Bridson
- Pavetta microthamnus K.Schum.
- Pavetta mildbraedii K.Krause
- Pavetta mindanaensis Bremek.
- Pavetta minor (Hook.f.) Deb & Rout
- Pavetta mirabilis Bremek.
- Pavetta mocambicensis Bremek.
- Pavetta mollis Afzel. ex Hiern
- Pavetta mollissima Hutch. & Dalziel
- Pavetta moluccana Bremek.
- Pavetta molundensis K.Krause
- Pavetta montana Reinw. ex Blume
- Pavetta monticola Hiern
- Pavetta mpomii S.D.Manning
- Pavetta mshigeniana Bridson
- Pavetta muelleri Bremek.
- Pavetta mufindiensis Bridson
- Pavetta muiriana S.D.Manning
- Pavetta multiflora (Koord. & Valeton) Bremek.
- Pavetta murleensis Cufod.
- Pavetta mzeleziensis Bridson
- Pavetta namatae S.D.Manning
- Pavetta nana K.Schum.
- Pavetta napieri (Ridl.) Bremek.
- Pavetta natalensis Sond.
- Pavetta naucleiflora R.Br. ex G.Don
- Pavetta nemoralis Bremek.
- Pavetta neurocarpa Benth.
- Pavetta nitidissima Bridson
- Pavetta nitidula Welw. ex Hiern
- Pavetta nova-guineensis Bremek.
- Pavetta obanica Bremek.
- Pavetta oblanceolata Bremek.
- Pavetta oblongifolia (Hiern) Bremek.
- Pavetta obovalis Bremek.
- Pavetta oligantha Valeton
- Pavetta olivaceonigra K.Schum.
- Pavetta oliveriana Hiern
- Pavetta ombrophila Bremek.
- Pavetta opulina (G.Forst.) DC.
- Pavetta oresitropha Bremek.
- Pavetta orthanthera Bremek.
- Pavetta owariensis P.Beauv.
- Pavetta palembangensis Bremek.
- Pavetta pammalaka Bremek.
- Pavetta parasitica Lour.
- Pavetta parvifolia S.Vidal
- Pavetta paupercula K.Schum.
- Pavetta petiolaris Wall. ex Craib
- Pavetta phanerophlebia Merr.
- Pavetta pierlotii Bridson
- Pavetta pierrei Bremek.
- Pavetta platycalyx Bremek.
- Pavetta platyclada K.Schum. & Lauterb.
- Pavetta plumosa Hutch. & Dalziel
- Pavetta pocsii Bridson
- Pavetta praeterita Bremek.
- Pavetta pseudoalbicaulis Bridson
- Pavetta puberula Hiern
- Pavetta puffii Barbhuiya, J.Sarma & S.Dey
- Pavetta pumila N.E.Br.
- Pavetta pygmaea Bremek.
- Pavetta quasidigita W.D.Hawth.
- Pavetta radicans Hiern
- Pavetta redheadii Bremek.
- Pavetta refractifolia K.Schum.
- Pavetta reinwardtii Bremek.
- Pavetta renidens (K.Krause) Bremek.
- Pavetta revoluta Hochst.
- Pavetta richardsiae Bridson
- Pavetta rigida Hiern
- Pavetta robusta Bremek.
- Pavetta roseostellata Bridson
- Pavetta ruahaensis Bridson
- Pavetta rubentifolia S.D.Manning
- Pavetta rupicola S.T.Reynolds
- Pavetta ruttenii Bremek.
- Pavetta ruwenzoriensis S.Moore
- Pavetta rwandensis Bridson
- Pavetta salicina (Ridl.) Bremek.
- Pavetta sansibarica K.Schum.
- Pavetta sapoensis W.D.Hawth.
- Pavetta sarasinorum Bremek.
- Pavetta scabrifolia Bremek.
- Pavetta schliebenii Mildbr. ex Bremek.
- Pavetta schumanniana F.Hoffm. ex K.Schum.
- Pavetta schweinfurthii Bremek.
- Pavetta sennii Chiov.
- Pavetta sepium K.Schum.
- Pavetta seretii De Wild.
- Pavetta siamica Bremek.
- Pavetta siphonantha Dalzell
- Pavetta sonjae W.D.Hawth.
- Pavetta sparsipila Bremek.
- Pavetta spathulata Bremek.
- Pavetta speciosa S.T.Reynolds
- Pavetta sphaerobotrys K.Schum.
- Pavetta staudtii Hutch. & Dalziel
- Pavetta stemonogyne Mildbr. ex Bremek.
- Pavetta stenosepala K.Schum.
- Pavetta stipulopallium K.Schum.
- Pavetta subcana Hiern
- Pavetta subcapitata Hook.f.
- Pavetta subferruginea Merr.
- Pavetta subglabra Schumach.
- Pavetta subumbellata Bremek.
- Pavetta subvelutina Miq.
- Pavetta suffruticosa K.Schum.
- Pavetta sumbawensis Bremek.
- Pavetta swatowica Bremek.
- Pavetta sylvatica Blume
- Pavetta talbotii Wernham
- Pavetta tarennoides S.Moore
- Pavetta teitana K.Schum.
- Pavetta tendagurensis Bremek.
- Pavetta tenella S.T.Reynolds
- Pavetta tenuissima S.D.Manning
- Pavetta ternifolia Hiern
- Pavetta testui Bremek.
- Pavetta tetramera (Hiern) Bremek.
- Pavetta thwaitesii Bremek.
- Pavetta tomentosa Roxb. ex Sm.
- Pavetta tonkinensis Bremek.
- Pavetta trachyphylla Bremek.
- Pavetta transjubensis Chiov.
- Pavetta translucens Bremek.
- Pavetta travancorica Bremek.
- Pavetta trichardtensis Bremek.
- Pavetta troupinii Bridson
- Pavetta tschikonderi N.Hahn
- Pavetta umtalensis Bremek.
- Pavetta uniflora Bremek.
- Pavetta urophylla Bremek.
- Pavetta urundensis Bremek.
- Pavetta vaga S.T.Reynolds
- Pavetta valetonii Bremek.
- Pavetta vanderijstii Bremek.
- Pavetta vanwykiana Bridson
- Pavetta venenata Hutch. & E.A.Bruce
- Pavetta villosa Vahl
- Pavetta viridiloba K.Krause
- Pavetta wallichiana Steud. ex Craib
- Pavetta whiteana Bridson
- Pavetta wightii Hook.f.
- Pavetta wildemannii Bremek.
- Pavetta williamsii Merr.
- Pavetta yambatensis Bremek.
- Pavetta zeyheri Sond.
- Pavetta zeylanica (Hook.f.) Gamble
- Pavetta zimmermanniana Valeton
