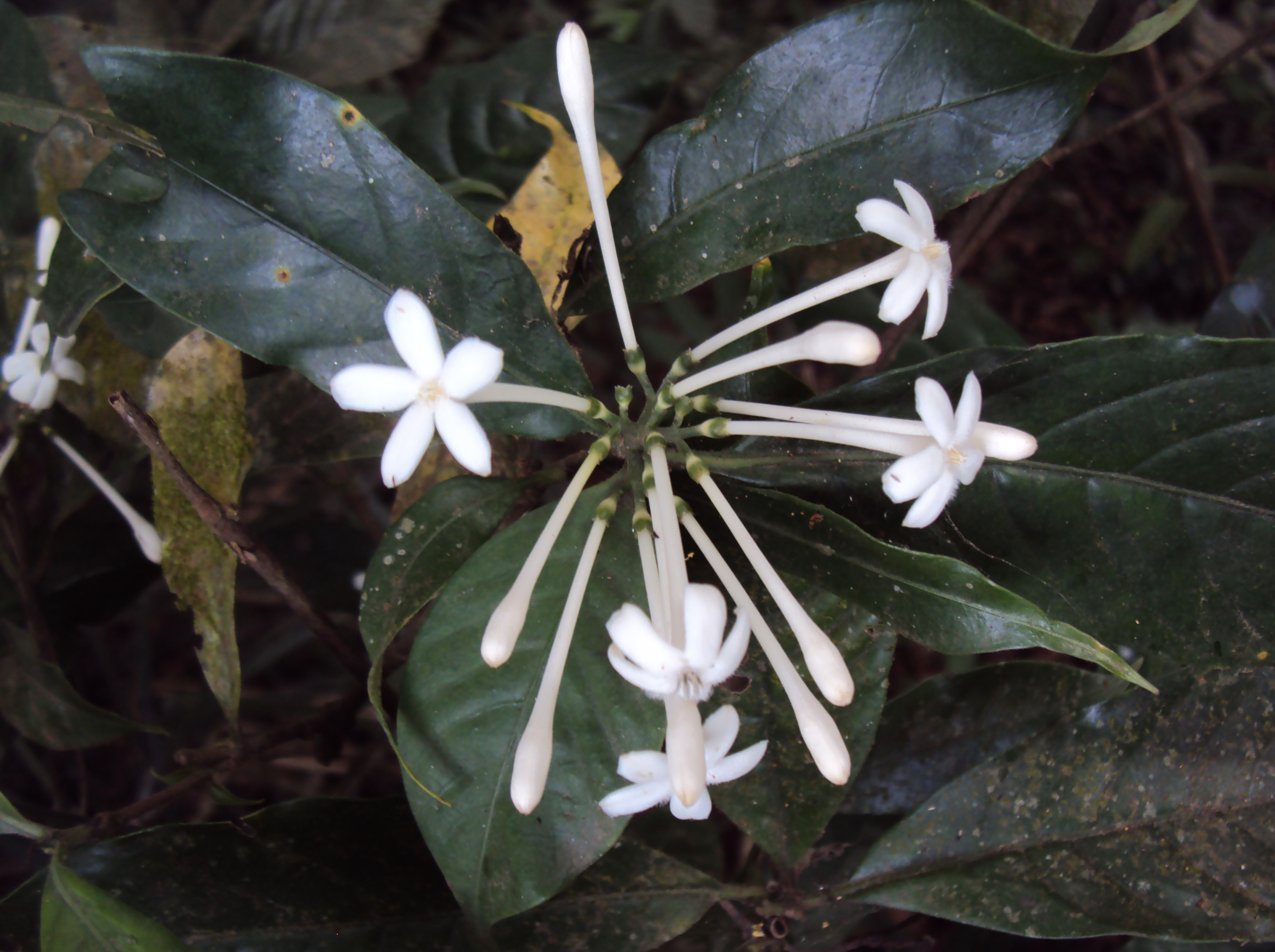
- Tarenna nilagirica

Scientific classification
- Kingdom: Plantae
- Clade: Tracheophytes
- Clade: Angiosperms
- Clade: Eudicots
- Clade: Asterids
- Order: Gentianales
- Family: Rubiaceae
- Subfamily: Ixoroideae
- Tribe: Pavetteae
- Genus: Tarenna; Gaertn.

Type species
- Tarenna asiatica (L.) Kuntze ex K.Schum.

Synonyms
- Bonatia Schltr. & K.Krause; Camptophytum Pierre ex A.Chev.; Canthiopsis Seem.; Chomelia L.; Cupi Adans.; Flemingia W.Hunter; Wahlenbergia Blume; Webera Schreb.

= Tarenna =

Genus of flowering plants

Tarenna is a genus of flowering plants in the family Rubiaceae. There are about 193 species distributed across the old world tropics of Africa, Asia, Australia, and the Pacific Islands. Petra De Block et al. have assigned several species formerly included in Tarenna to other genera, Cladoceras, Sonbridia, and Nesotarenna within the tribe Pavetteae. They are shrubs or trees with oppositely arranged leaves and terminal arrays of whitish, greenish, or yellowish flowers.

== Species ==
As of December 2025 Plants of the World Online accepts 193 species.

- Tarenna acuminata Merr.
- Tarenna acutisepala F.C.How ex W.C.Chen
- Tarenna adangensis (Ridl.) Ridl.
- Tarenna adpressa (King) Merr.
- Tarenna agnata Cheek & Lopez Poveda
- Tarenna agumbensis Sundararagh.
- Tarenna alleizettei (Dubard & Dop) De Block
- Tarenna alpestris (Wight) N.P.Balakr.
- Tarenna angustifolia Merr.
- Tarenna annamensis Pit.
- Tarenna arborea (Elmer) Elmer
- Tarenna arborescens Ridl.
- Tarenna asiatica (L.) Kuntze ex K.Schum.
- Tarenna attenuata (Hook.f.) Hutch.
- Tarenna aurantiaca Naiki & Tagane
- Tarenna austrosinensis Chun & F.C.How ex W.C.Chen
- Tarenna baconoides Wernham
- Tarenna bakeri (Merr.) Bremek.
- Tarenna barbellata Valeton
- Tarenna bartlettii Ridl.
- Tarenna bartlingii Bremek.
- Tarenna baviensis (Drake) Pit.
- Tarenna bipindensis (K.Schum.) Bremek.
- Tarenna bonii Pit.
- Tarenna borneensis Valeton
- Tarenna brachysiphon (Hiern) Keay
- Tarenna brevicymigera W.C.Chen
- Tarenna bridsoniana Degreef
- Tarenna burttii Bridson
- Tarenna calliblepharis N.Hallé
- Tarenna campaniflora (Hook.f.) N.P.Balakr.
- Tarenna canarica (Bedd.) Bremek.
- Tarenna capitata Pit.
- Tarenna capuroniana De Block
- Tarenna catanduanensis Merr.
- Tarenna celebica (Miq.) Ruhsam
- Tarenna charlesii S.Maya & Sunilk.
- Tarenna chevalieri Pit.
- Tarenna ciliolata (Korth.) Bremek.
- Tarenna cinerea Craib
- Tarenna collinsiae Craib
- Tarenna compactiflora (Kurz) Bremek.
- Tarenna conferta (Benth.) Hiern
- Tarenna confusa (Blume) Valeton
- Tarenna congensis Hiern
- Tarenna coriacea (Korth.) Merr.
- Tarenna costata (Miq.) Merr.
- Tarenna crassifolia Ridl.
- Tarenna cumingiana (S.Vidal) Elmer
- Tarenna curtisii (King) F.N.Williams
- Tarenna dallachiana (F.Muell. ex Benth.) S.Moore
- Tarenna dasyphylla (Miq.) Valeton ex Steenis
- Tarenna debilis Ridl.
- Tarenna depauperata Hutch.
- Tarenna disperma (Hook.f.) Pit.
- Tarenna drummondii Bridson
- Tarenna ebracteata (Elmer) Elmer
- Tarenna eketensis Wernham
- Tarenna elongata Merr.
- Tarenna eucrantha (Elmer) Merr.
- Tarenna evansii Ridl.
- Tarenna flava Alston
- Tarenna foonchewii (W.C.Ko) Tao Chen
- Tarenna forsteniana (Miq.) Ruhsam
- Tarenna fragrans (Blume) Koord. & Valeton
- Tarenna funebris (Bremek.) N.Hallé
- Tarenna fuscoflava (K.Schum.) S.Moore
- Tarenna gibbsiae Wernham
- Tarenna gilletii (De Wild. & T.Durand) N.Hallé ex Gereau
- Tarenna glaberrima Ridl.
- Tarenna gossweileri S.Moore
- Tarenna gracilipes (Hayata) Ohwi
- Tarenna gracilis (Stapf) Keay
- Tarenna grandiflora (Benth.) Hiern
- Tarenna harleyae Jongkind
- Tarenna harmandiana Pit.
- Tarenna helferi (Kurz) N.P.Balakr. ex S.C.Das & M.A.Rahman
- Tarenna hexamera (Schltr. & K.Krause) Jérémie
- Tarenna hirsuta Craib
- Tarenna hispidula Craib
- Tarenna hoaensis Pit.
- Tarenna hosei Ridl.
- Tarenna hutchinsonii Bremek.
- Tarenna idukkiana Robi & Balan
- Tarenna ignambiensis (Guillaumin) Jérémie
- Tarenna inops Degreef
- Tarenna insularis (Ridl.) Ridl.
- Tarenna jolinonii N.Hallé
- Tarenna joskei (Horne ex Baker) A.C.Sm. & S.P.Darwin
- Tarenna junodii (Schinz) Bremek.
- Tarenna keyensis Valeton
- Tarenna kivuensis Degreef
- Tarenna lanceolata Chun & F.C.How ex W.C.Chen
- Tarenna lancilimba W.C.Chen
- Tarenna lasiorhachis (K.Schum. & K.Krause) Bremek.
- Tarenna laticorymbosa Chun & F.C.How ex W.C.Chen
- Tarenna latifolia Pit.
- Tarenna laui Merr.
- Tarenna leioloba (Guillaumin) S.Moore
- Tarenna leonardii N.Hallé
- Tarenna lifouana (Däniker) Jérémie
- Tarenna limbata (Stapf) Bremek.
- Tarenna littoralis Merr.
- Tarenna loheri (Merr.) Bremek.
- Tarenna longifolia (Miq.) Ridl.
- Tarenna longipedicellata (J.G.García) Bridson
- Tarenna luhomeroensis Bridson
- Tarenna luteola (Stapf) Bremek.
- Tarenna luzoniensis (Vidal) Bremek.
- Tarenna macroptera (Miq.) Bremek.
- Tarenna madagascariensis (Ten.) I.M.Turner
- Tarenna maingayi (Hook.f.) Merr.
- Tarenna membranacea Pit.
- Tarenna meyeri (Elmer) Elmer
- Tarenna microcarpa (Guillaumin) Jérémie
- Tarenna mollis (Wall. ex Hook.f.) B.L.Rob.
- Tarenna mollissima (Hook. & Arn.) B.L.Rob.
- Tarenna monosperma (Wight & Arn.) D.C.S.Raju
- Tarenna monticola S.T.Reynolds & P.I.Forst.
- Tarenna multinervia (Merr.) Bremek.
- Tarenna nilagirica (Bedd.) Bremek.
- Tarenna nilotica Hiern
- Tarenna nitida Merr.
- Tarenna nitidula (Benth.) Hiern
- Tarenna nitiduloides G.Taylor
- Tarenna oblanceolata Ridl.
- Tarenna oblonga (Korth.) Bremek.
- Tarenna obtusifolia Merr.
- Tarenna odorata (Roxb.) B.L.Rob.
- Tarenna ogoouensis Degreef
- Tarenna palawanensis (Elmer) Merr.
- Tarenna pallidula Hiern
- Tarenna pangasinensis Merr.
- Tarenna pauciflora Craib
- Tarenna pavettoides (Harv.) Sim
- Tarenna peekeliana Valeton
- Tarenna pembensis J.E.Burrows
- Tarenna pentamera (Benth.) S.T.Reynolds
- Tarenna petitii N.Hallé
- Tarenna pilosa (Craib) Bremek.
- Tarenna polycarpa (Miq.) Koord. & Valeton
- Tarenna polysperma Chun & F.C.How ex W.C.Chen
- Tarenna precidantenna N.Hallé
- Tarenna principensis Degreef
- Tarenna puberula Craib
- Tarenna pubiflora (Decne.) Meijer
- Tarenna pubinervis Hutch.
- Tarenna pubituba (Merr.) Bremek.
- Tarenna pulchra (Ridl.) Ridl.
- Tarenna pumila (Hook.f.) Merr.
- Tarenna quadrangularis Bremek.
- Tarenna quocensis Pit.
- Tarenna rhypalostigma (Schltr.) Bremek.
- Tarenna ridleyi (H.Pearson ex Ridl.) Ridl.
- Tarenna roseicosta Bridson
- Tarenna rudis Ridl.
- Tarenna rwandensis Bridson
- Tarenna sakae Craib
- Tarenna sambucina (G.Forst.) T.Durand ex Drake
- Tarenna scaberula (Merr.) Merr.
- Tarenna scabrida S.Moore
- Tarenna sechellensis (Baker) Summerh.
- Tarenna seemanniana A.C.Sm. & S.P.Darwin
- Tarenna sinica W.C.Chen
- Tarenna spiranthera (Drake) Homolle
- Tarenna stellulata (Hook.f.) Ridl.
- Tarenna stenantha Merr.
- Tarenna subsessilis (A.Gray) Ito
- Tarenna sumatrana Ridl.
- Tarenna sumatrensis (Roth) Bremek.
- Tarenna sylvicola (Ridl.) Merr.
- Tarenna thomasii Hutch. & Dalziel
- Tarenna thorelii Pit.
- Tarenna thouarsiana (Drake) Homolle
- Tarenna tonkinensis Pit.
- Tarenna trichurensis Sasidh. & Sivar.
- Tarenna truncatocalyx (Guillaumin) Bremek.
- Tarenna tsangii Merr.
- Tarenna uniflora Homolle
- Tarenna unioensis (Guillaumin) Jérémie
- Tarenna uzungwaensis Bridson
- Tarenna valida Craib
- Tarenna vanprukii Craib
- Tarenna verticillata Jérémie
- Tarenna vignei Hutch. & Dalziel
- Tarenna wallichii (Hook.f.) Ridl.
- Tarenna wangii Chun & F.C.How ex W.C.Chen
- Tarenna warburgiana Valeton
- Tarenna weberifolia (Kurz) N.P.Balakr.
- Tarenna winkleri Valeton
- Tarenna wrayi (King) Ridl.
- Tarenna yappii (King) Ridl.
- Tarenna yunnanensis F.C.How ex W.C.Chen

== Image gallery ==
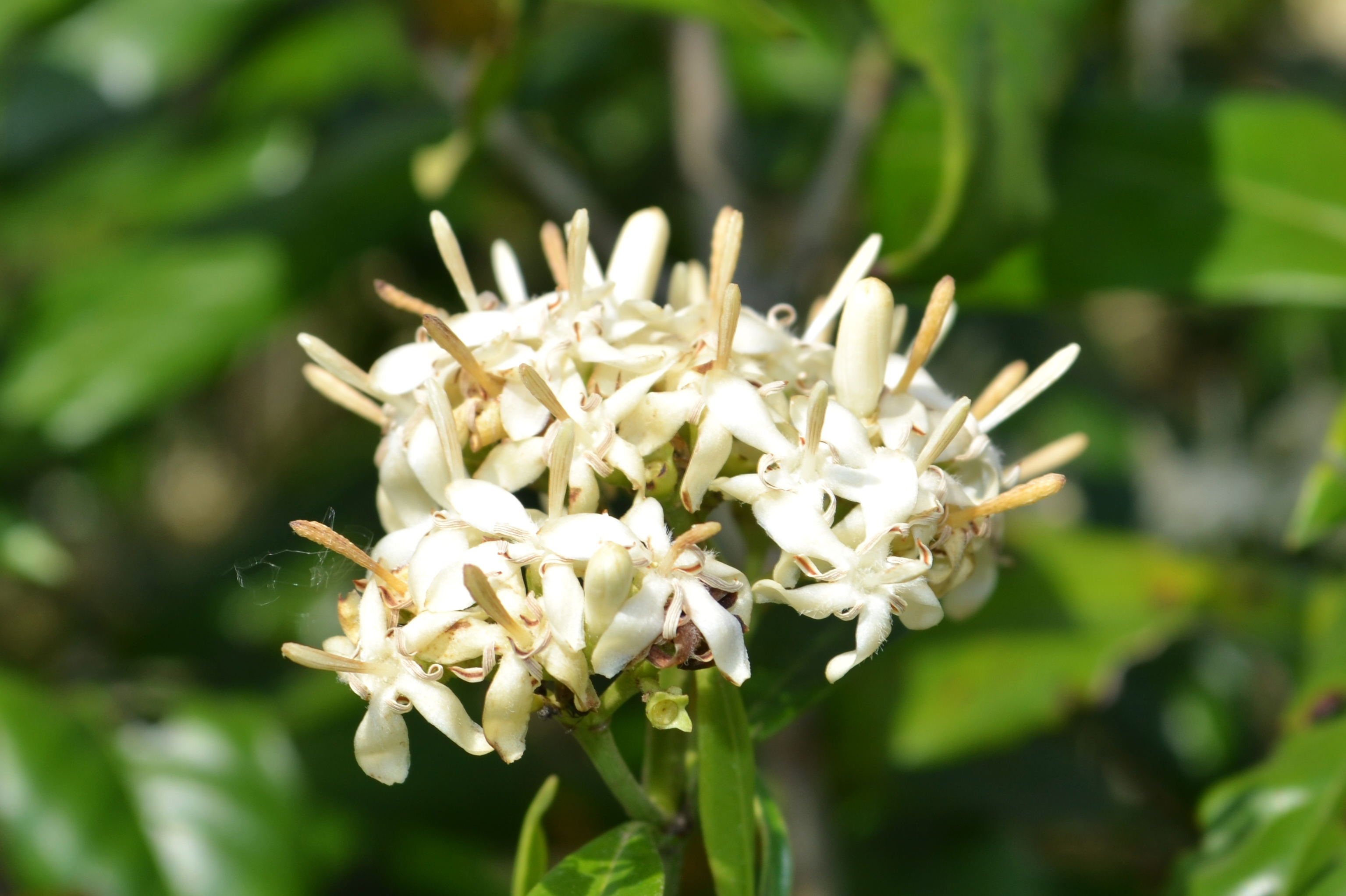
Tarenna asiatica

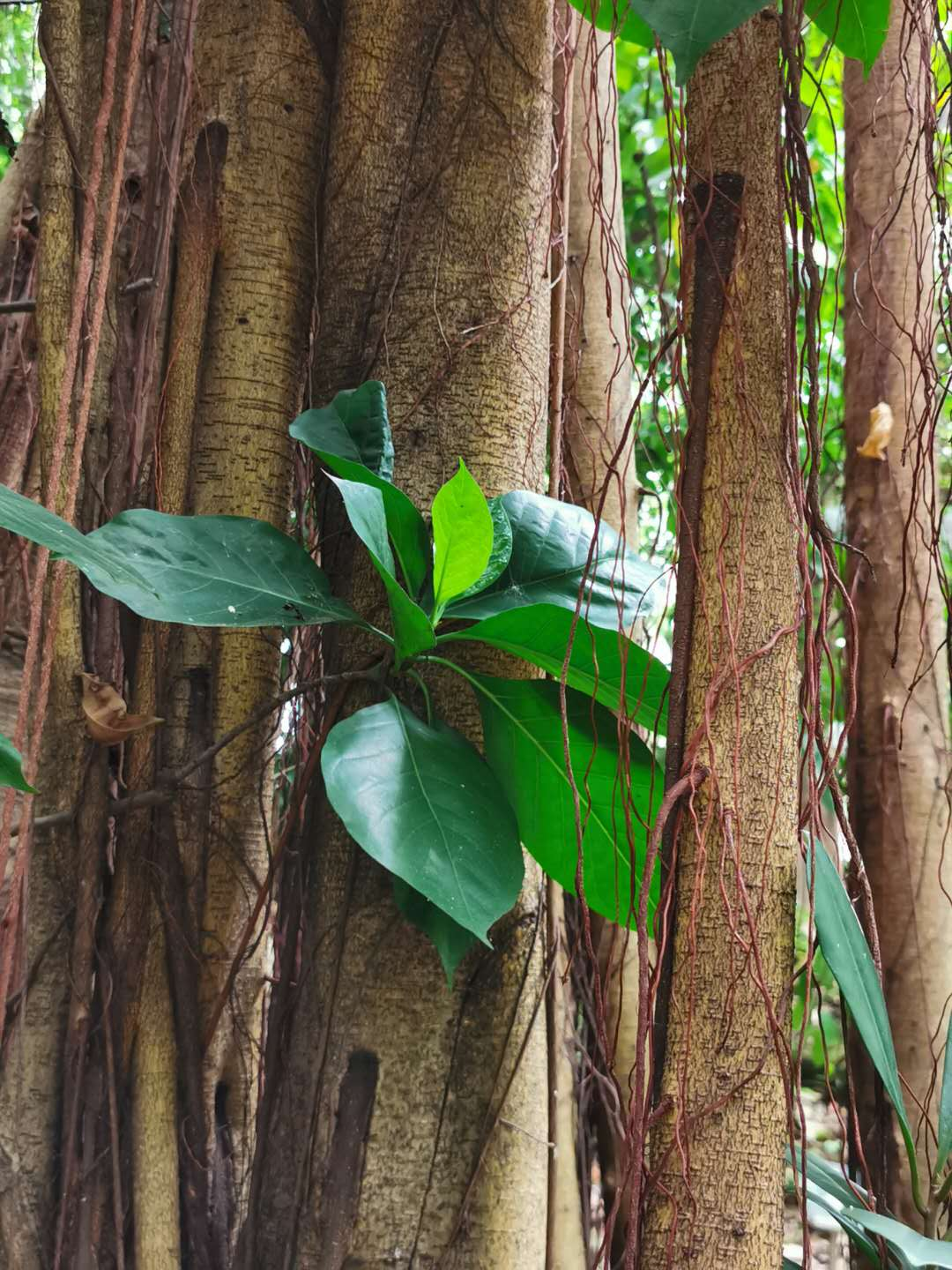
Tarenna asiatica

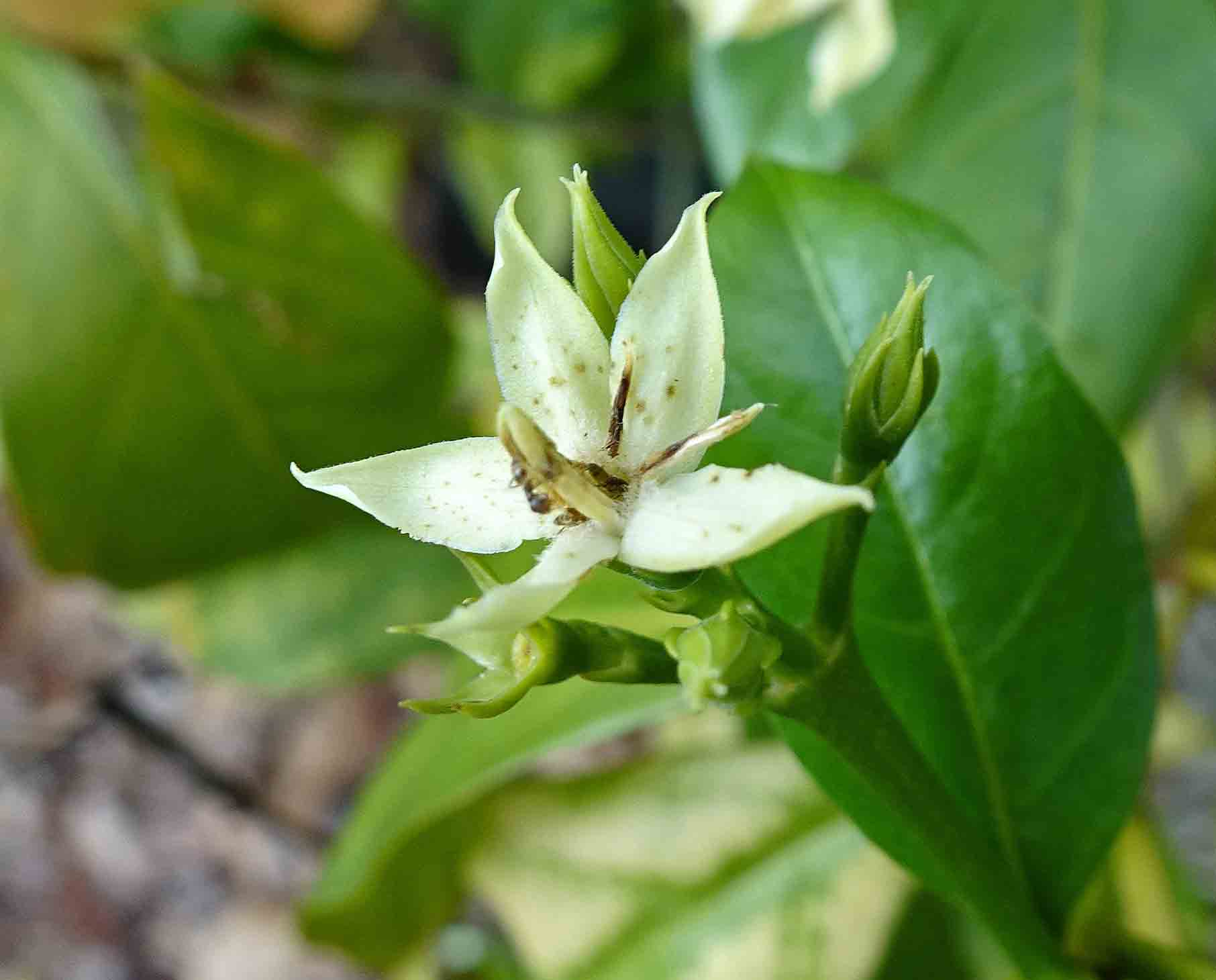
Tarenna stellulata
