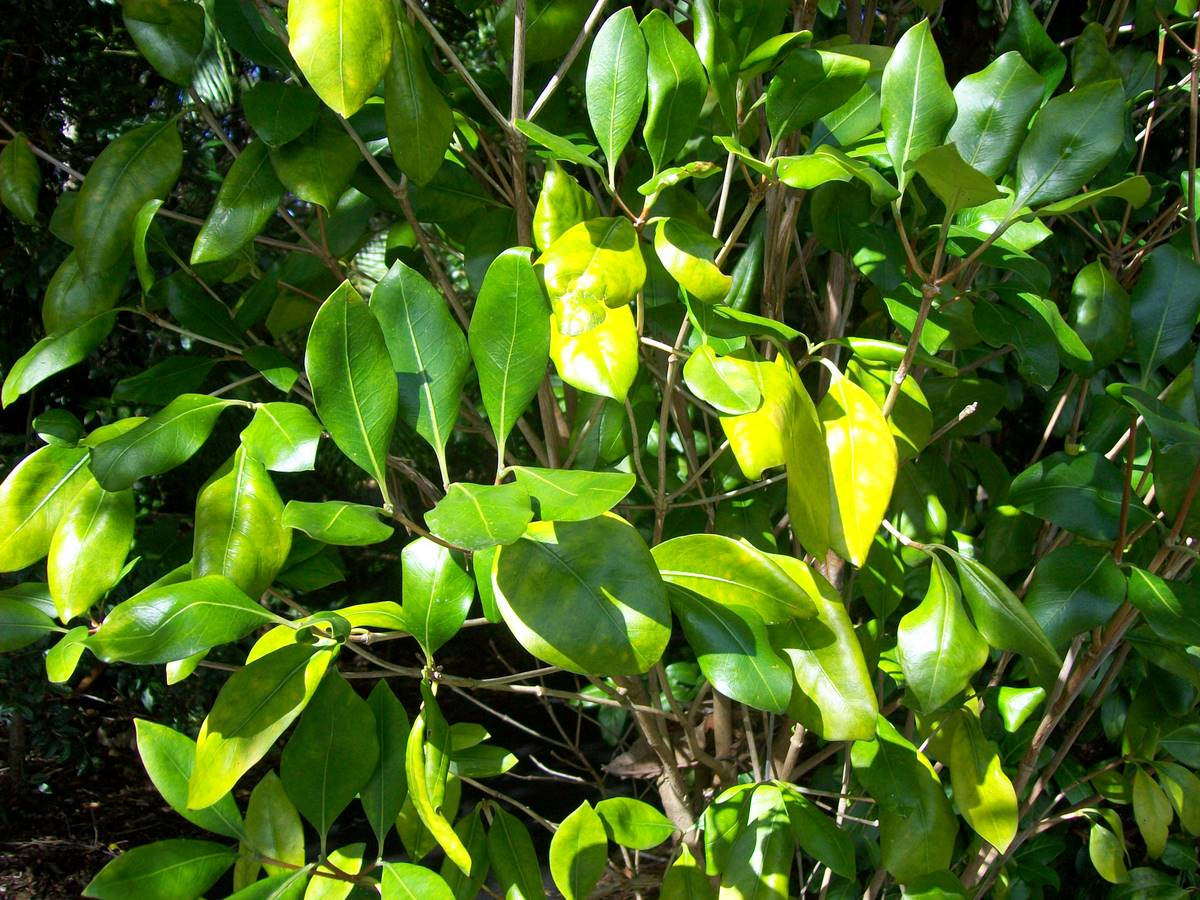
- Triflorensia cameronii

Scientific classification
- Kingdom: Plantae
- Clade: Tracheophytes
- Clade: Angiosperms
- Clade: Eudicots
- Clade: Asterids
- Order: Gentianales
- Family: Rubiaceae
- Subfamily: Ixoroideae
- Tribe: Pavetteae
- Genus: Triflorensia; S.T.Reynolds

= Triflorensia =

Genus of plants

Triflorensia is a genus of flowering plants in the family Rubiaceae. It is endemic to Australia.

== Species ==
- Triflorensia australis (Benth.) S.T.Reynolds
- Triflorensia cameronii (C.T.White) S.T.Reynolds
- Triflorensia ixoroides (F.Muell.) S.T.Reynolds
