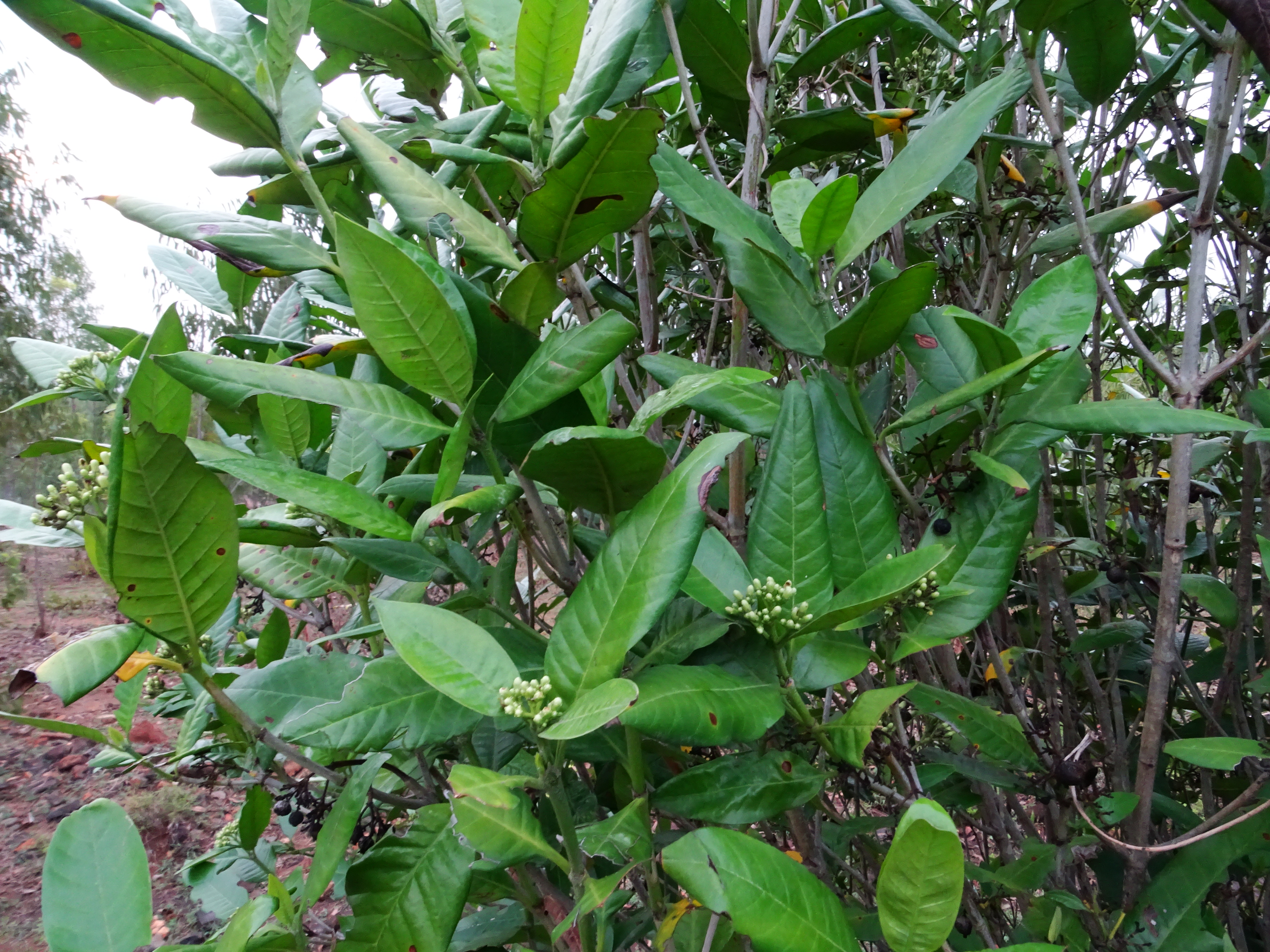
- Tarenna asiatica seen in Mahanthalingapura in the outskirts of Bangalore

Scientific classification
- Kingdom: Plantae
- Clade: Tracheophytes
- Clade: Angiosperms
- Clade: Eudicots
- Clade: Asterids
- Order: Gentianales
- Family: Rubiaceae
- Genus: Tarenna
- Species: T. asiatica

Binomial name
- Tarenna asiatica (L.) Kuntze ex K.Schum.

Synonyms
- Rondeletia asiatica L.

= Tarenna asiatica =

Species of flowering plant

Tarenna asiatica, the Asiatic tarenna, is a species of flowering plants in the family Rubiaceae.

== Medicinal uses ==
Extracts of T. asiatica have been evaluated for use against dengue virus and Brucella.
