= Rutidea =

Scientific classification
- Kingdom: Plantae
- Clade: Tracheophytes
- Clade: Angiosperms
- Clade: Eudicots
- Clade: Asterids
- Order: Gentianales
- Family: Rubiaceae
- Subfamily: Ixoroideae
- Tribe: Pavetteae
- Genus: Rutidea; DC.

Species
- See text.

Genus of plants

Rutidea is a genus of plant in the family Rubiaceae. As of January 2026, Plants of the World Online accepted the following species:

- Rutidea decorticata Hiern
- Rutidea dupuisii De Wild.
- Rutidea ferruginea Hiern
- Rutidea fuscescens Hiern
- Rutidea gabonensis Bridson
- Rutidea glabra Hiern
- Rutidea gracilis Bridson
- Rutidea hirsuta Hiern
- Rutidea hispida Hiern
- Rutidea insculpta Mildbr. ex Bridson
- Rutidea lujae De Wild.
- Rutidea membranacea Hiern
- Rutidea nigerica Bridson
- Rutidea olenotricha Hiern
- Rutidea orientalis Bridson
- Rutidea parviflora DC.
- Rutidea rufipilis Hiern
- Rutidea seretii De Wild.
- Rutidea smithii Hiern
- Rutidea tenuicaulis K.Krause
- Rutidea vanderystii Wernham
