= Tarenna monosperma =

Conservation status
- Endangered (IUCN 2.3)

Scientific classification
- Kingdom: Plantae
- Clade: Tracheophytes
- Clade: Angiosperms
- Clade: Eudicots
- Clade: Asterids
- Order: Gentianales
- Family: Rubiaceae
- Genus: Tarenna
- Species: T. monosperma

Binomial name
- Tarenna monosperma (Wight & Arn.) Balakr.

Species of plant

Tarenna monosperma is a species of plant in the family Rubiaceae. It is native to Kerala and Tamil Nadu in India.
