= Nichallea =

Scientific classification
- Kingdom: Plantae
- Clade: Tracheophytes
- Clade: Angiosperms
- Clade: Eudicots
- Clade: Asterids
- Order: Gentianales
- Family: Rubiaceae
- Subfamily: Ixoroideae
- Tribe: Pavetteae
- Genus: Nichallea; Bridson
- Species: N. soyauxii

Binomial name
- Nichallea soyauxii (Hiern) Bridson

Synonyms
- Synonyms: Ixora asteriscus K.Schum.; Ixora atrata Stapf; Ixora soyauxii Hiern; Ixora thomsonii Hiern; Pavetta melanophylla K.Schum.; Rutidea atrata Mildbr. ex Hutch. & Dalziel; Rutidea melanophylla (K.Schum.) Mildbr.; Tarenna asteriscus (K.Schum.) Bremek.; Tarenna lagosensis Hutch. & Dalziel; Tarenna nigrescens R.D.Good; Tarenna nigroviridis R.D.Good; Tarenna soyauxii (Hiern) Bremek.

Species of plants

Nichallea is a monotypic genus of flowering plants belonging to the family Rubiaceae. It only contains one species, Nichallea soyauxii.

Its native range is western and western central Tropical Africa. It is found in the countries of Cabinda (Angola), Cameroon, Congo, Gabon, Ghana, Ivory Coast, Liberia, Nigeria, Sierra Leone and Zaïre.

The genus name of Nichallea is in honour of Nicolas Hallé, a French botanist at the National Museum of Natural History and was a specialist in Rubiaceae. The Latin specific epithet of soyauxii refers Hermann Soyaux (1852–1928), a German gardener, botanist and African explorer. Both the genus and the species were first described and published in Kew Bull. Vol.33 on page 288–290 in 1978.
