= Tulearia =

Scientific classification
- Kingdom: Plantae
- Clade: Tracheophytes
- Clade: Angiosperms
- Clade: Eudicots
- Clade: Asterids
- Order: Gentianales
- Family: Rubiaceae
- Subfamily: Ixoroideae
- Tribe: Pavetteae
- Genus: Tulearia; De Block

Genus of flowering plants

Tulearia is a genus of flowering plants belonging to the family Rubiaceae.

Its native range is Madagascar.

Species:

- Tulearia capsaintemariensis De Block
- Tulearia splendida De Block
