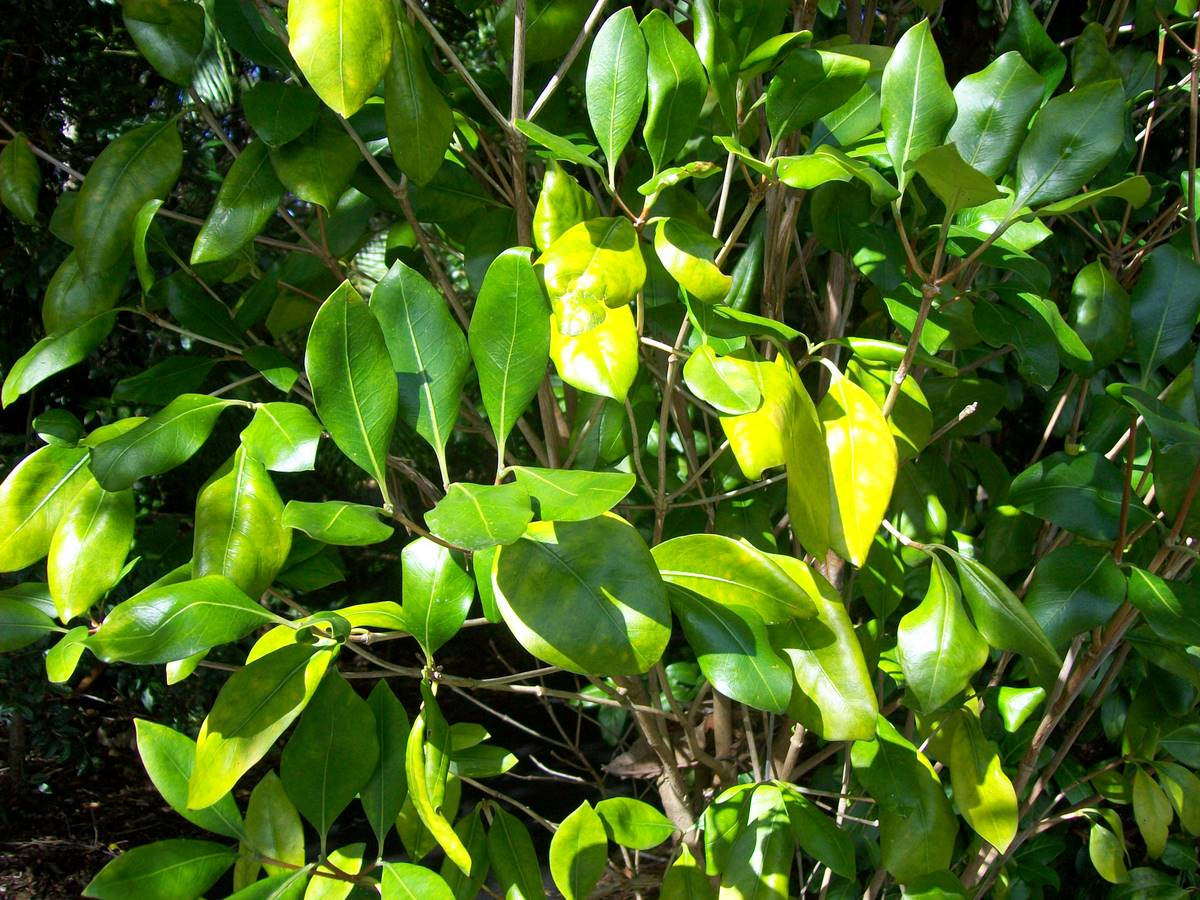
- leaves of Triflorensia cameronii

Conservation status
- Endangered (EPBC Act)

Scientific classification
- Kingdom: Plantae
- Clade: Tracheophytes
- Clade: Angiosperms
- Clade: Eudicots
- Clade: Asterids
- Order: Gentianales
- Family: Rubiaceae
- Genus: Triflorensia
- Species: T. cameronii

Binomial name
- Triflorensia cameronii (C.T.White) S.T.Reynolds

Synonyms
- Diplospora cameronii C.T.White; Tarenna cameronii (C.T.White) S.J.Ali & Robbr.

= Triflorensia cameronii =

Species of tree

Triflorensia cameronii is a very rare rainforest plant of the coffee family, growing in a few areas of eastern Australia. Found in Lismore, New South Wales as well as a few other locations in nearby Queensland. Soils are based on basalt, and the rainforest is the drier type, with hoop pine nearby.

== Description ==
A shrub or a small tree, up to 6 metres in height with a crooked trunk with brown bark. Small branches are pale with thin bark coming off in flakes. The sideways shoots arise from the leaf axils. Additionally, they form well above the leaf axils. Triangular stipules form between the leaf pairs, with a fine tip.

=== Leaves ===
Leaves are ovate to elliptic in shape. 4 to 10 cm long, and 1.2 to 4.5 cm wide. Opposite on the stem, with smooth edges. Thick, not glossy and hairless. Paler below with a short leaf tip. Leaf stems 5 to 15 mm long. The main leaf vein, the mid rib is raised on the top side with a noticeable channel. There's around 10 lateral veins which loop around the edge of the leaf.

=== Flowers and fruit ===
Whitish green flowers form from August to November, appearing on three main branchlets each with three flowers, or a further three more branchlets. The middle flower of which has a very short stalk, those on the side longer. The fruit is a black oval drupe with the remains of the sepals still attached. Within the fruit is between one and five seeds. Fruit mature from December to February. Fresh seed are advised for regeneration.

== Taxonomy ==
The scientific name refers to the flowers forming in threes, (Triflorensia) and the specific epithet names M.A. Cameron, who collected the original specimen at Yarraman in December 1924.
