= Rutidea nigerica =

Conservation status
- Vulnerable (IUCN 3.1)

Scientific classification
- Kingdom: Plantae
- Clade: Tracheophytes
- Clade: Angiosperms
- Clade: Eudicots
- Clade: Asterids
- Order: Gentianales
- Family: Rubiaceae
- Genus: Rutidea
- Species: R. nigerica

Binomial name
- Rutidea nigerica Bridson

Species of plant

Rutidea nigerica is a species of plant in the family Rubiaceae. It is found in Benin, Cameroon, and Nigeria. Its natural habitat is subtropical or tropical moist lowland forests. It is threatened by habitat loss.
