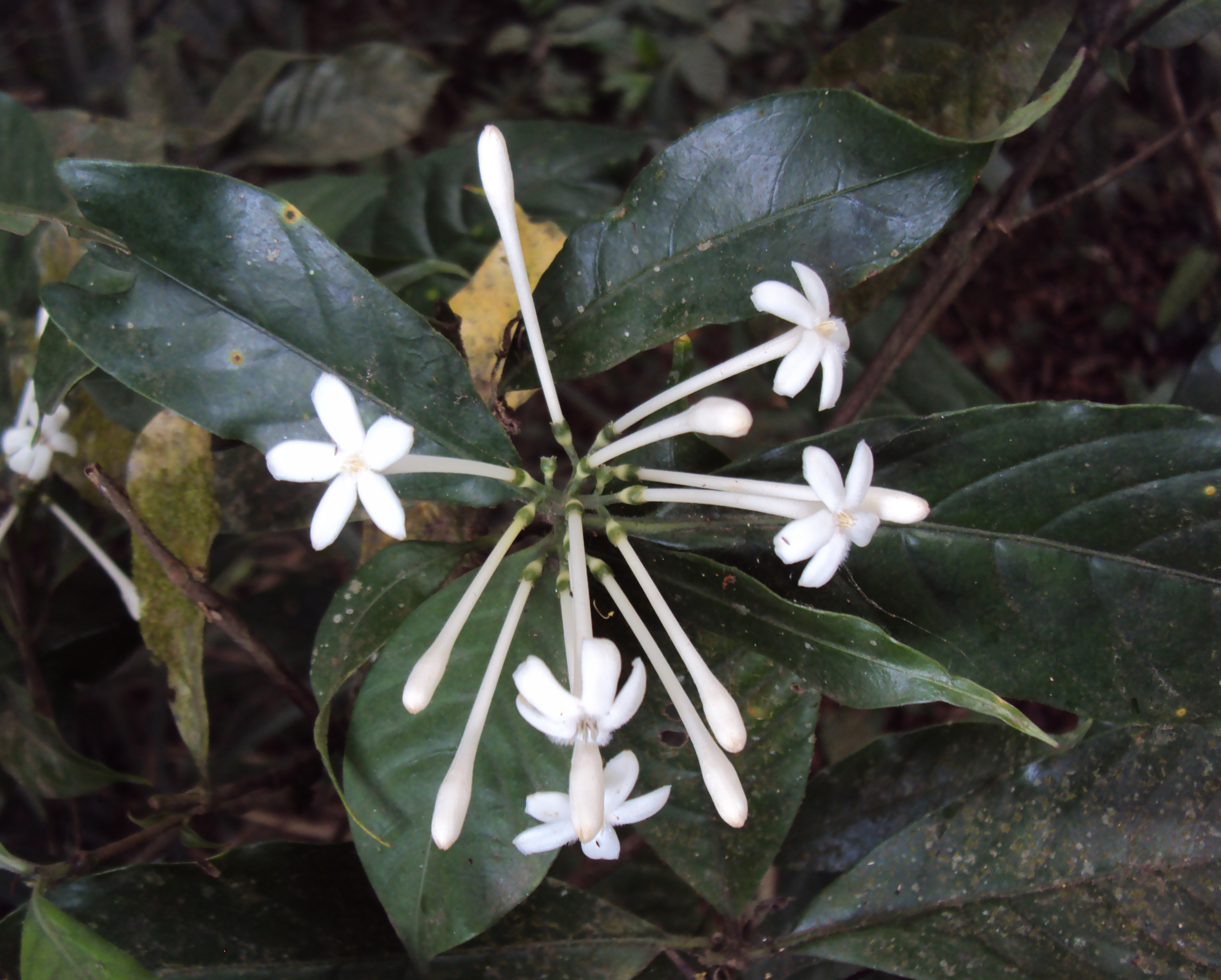

Conservation status
- Vulnerable (IUCN 2.3)

Scientific classification
- Kingdom: Plantae
- Clade: Tracheophytes
- Clade: Angiosperms
- Clade: Eudicots
- Clade: Asterids
- Order: Gentianales
- Family: Rubiaceae
- Genus: Tarenna
- Species: T. nilagirica

Binomial name
- Tarenna nilagirica (Bedd.) Raju

= Tarenna nilagirica =

Species of plant

Tarenna nilagirica is a species of plant in the family Rubiaceae. It is native to Karnataka and Kerala in India.
