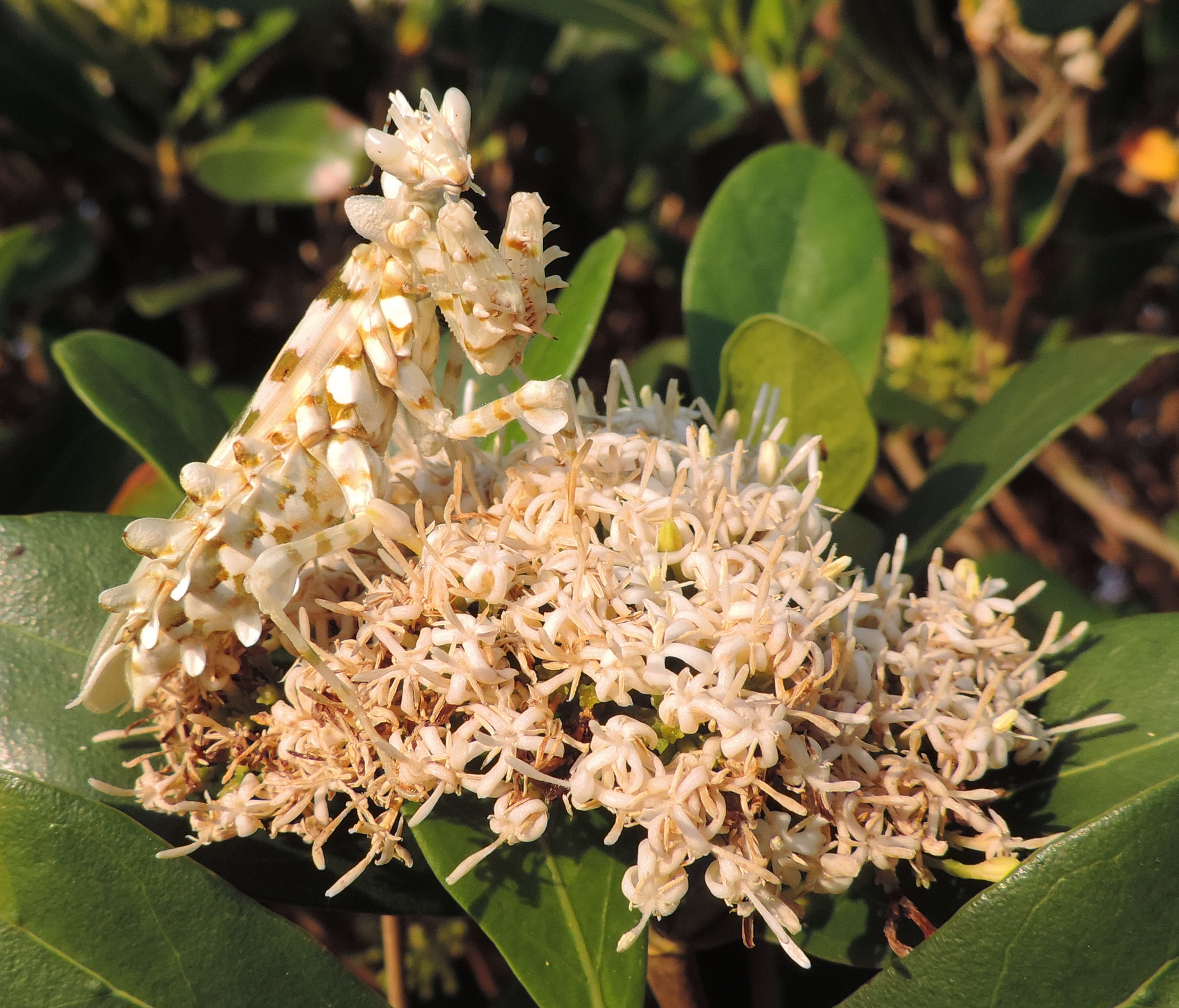
- Coptosperma littorale

Scientific classification
- Kingdom: Plantae
- Clade: Tracheophytes
- Clade: Angiosperms
- Clade: Eudicots
- Clade: Asterids
- Order: Gentianales
- Family: Rubiaceae
- Subfamily: Ixoroideae
- Tribe: Pavetteae
- Genus: Coptosperma; Hook.f.

Type species
- Coptosperma nigrescens Hook.f.

Synonyms
- Enterospermum Hiern; Santalina Baill.; Zygoon Hiern

= Coptosperma =

Genus of plants

Coptosperma is a genus of flowering plants in the family Rubiaceae. It contains 19 species native to Africa, the Arabian Peninsula, and various islands of the Indian Ocean (Madagascar, Comoros, Mauritius, Réunion, etc.).

== Species ==
- Coptosperma bernierianum (Baill.) De Block
- Coptosperma borbonicum (Hend.& Andr.Hend.) De Block
- Coptosperma cymosum (Willd. ex Schult.) De Block
- Coptosperma graveolens (S.Moore) Degreef
  - Coptosperma graveolens subsp. arabicum (Cufod.) Degreef
  - Coptosperma graveolens subsp. graveolens
  - Coptosperma graveolens var. impolitum (Bridson) Degreef
- Coptosperma humblotii (Drake) De Block
- Coptosperma kibuwae (Bridson) Degreef
- Coptosperma littorale (Hiern) Degreef
- Coptosperma madagascariensis (Baill.) De Block
- Coptosperma mitochondrioides Mouly & De Block
- Coptosperma neurophyllum (S.Moore) Degreef
- Coptosperma nigrescens Hook.f.
- Coptosperma pachyphyllum (Baker) De Block
- Coptosperma peteri (Bridson) Degreef
- Coptosperma rhodesiacum (Bremek.) Degreef
- Coptosperma sessiliflorum De Block
- Coptosperma somaliense Degreef
- Coptosperma supra-axillare (Hemsl.) Degreef
- Coptosperma wajirense (Bridson) Degreef
- Coptosperma zygoon (Bridson) Degreef
