= Tarenna hoaensis =

Scientific classification
- Kingdom: Plantae
- Clade: Tracheophytes
- Clade: Angiosperms
- Clade: Eudicots
- Clade: Asterids
- Order: Gentianales
- Family: Rubiaceae
- Genus: Tarenna
- Species: T. hoaensis

Binomial name
- Tarenna hoaensis Pit.

Species of plant

Tarenna hoaensis is a species of plant in the family Rubiaceae. It is found in Vietnam, Cambodia, and Thailand.
