= Pseudocoptosperma =

Scientific classification
- Kingdom: Plantae
- Clade: Tracheophytes
- Clade: Angiosperms
- Clade: Eudicots
- Clade: Asterids
- Order: Gentianales
- Family: Rubiaceae
- Subfamily: Ixoroideae
- Tribe: Pavetteae
- Genus: Pseudocoptosperma; De Block (2018)
- Species: P. menabense

Binomial name
- Pseudocoptosperma menabense Capuron ex De Block (2018)

Species of plant

Pseudocoptosperma menabense is a species of flowering plant in the family Rubiaceae. It is a shrub endemic to Madagascar. It is the sole species in genus Pseudocoptosperma.
