= Exallosperma =

Scientific classification
- Kingdom: Plantae
- Clade: Tracheophytes
- Clade: Angiosperms
- Clade: Eudicots
- Clade: Asterids
- Order: Gentianales
- Family: Rubiaceae
- Subfamily: Ixoroideae
- Tribe: Pavetteae
- Genus: Exallosperma; De Block (2018)
- Species: E. longiflora

Binomial name
- Exallosperma longiflora De Block (2018)

Genus of plants

Exallosperma longiflora is a species of flowering plant belonging to the family Rubiaceae. It is a shrub endemic to Madagascar. It is the sole species in genus Exallosperma.

Exallosperma longiflora is a shrub which grows up to 5 meters tall. It flowers in January and February, and fruits in April. It is known only from the northern tip of Madagascar in Sava and Diana regions. It grows in lowland dry deciduous and semi-deciduous forest on limestone, from sea level to 450 meters elevation.

The genus is distinguished within tribe Pavetteae by pollen with psilate tectum, and by fruit with two stony pyrenes. Each pyrene contains a laterally flattened ovoid seed with irregularly distributed surface ridges. The ridges are formed by elongation of the outer layer (exotesta) cells.
