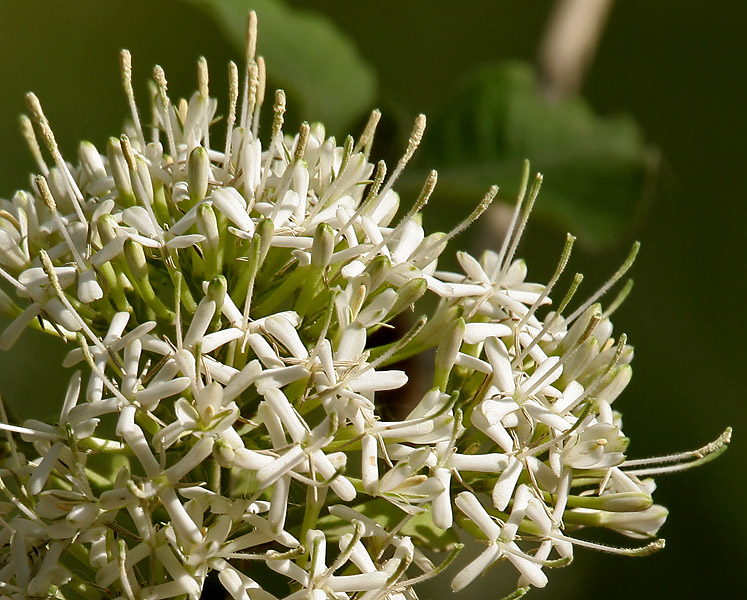
- Pavetta crassicaulis

Scientific classification
- Kingdom: Plantae
- Clade: Tracheophytes
- Clade: Angiosperms
- Clade: Eudicots
- Clade: Asterids
- Order: Gentianales
- Family: Rubiaceae
- Subfamily: Ixoroideae
- Tribe: Pavetteae; Dumort.

Type genus
- Pavetta L.

= Pavetteae =

Tribe of plants

Pavetteae is a tribe of flowering plants in the family Rubiaceae and contains about 624 species in 9 genera. Its representatives are found from the tropics and subtropics of the Old World and the southern Pacific region.

== Genera ==
Currently accepted names

- Cladoceras Bremek. (1 sp.)
- Coptosperma Hook.f. (21 sp.)
- Exallosperma De Block (1 sp.)
- Helictosperma De Block (2 sp.)
- Leptactina Hook.f. (19 sp.)
- Nichallea Bridson (1 sp.)
- Paracephaelis Baill. (4 sp.)
- Pavetta L. (358 sp.)
- Pseudocoptosperma De Block (1 sp.)
- Robbrechtia De Block (2 sp.)
- Rutidea DC. (21 sp.)
- Tarenna Gaertn. (191 sp.)
- Tulearia De Block (2 sp.)

Synonyms

- Acmostigma Raf. = Pavetta
- Baconia DC. = Pavetta
- Bonatia Schltr. & K.Krause = Tarenna
- Camptophytum Pierre ex A.Chev. = Tarenna
- Canthiopsis Seem. = Tarenna
- Chomelia L. = Tarenna
- Coleactina N.Hallé = Leptactina
- Crinita Houtt. = Pavetta
- Cupi Adans. = Tarenna
- Dictyandra Welw. ex Hook.f. = Leptactina
- Enterospermum Hiern = Coptosperma
- Exechostylus K.Schum. = Pavetta
- Flemingia W.Hunter = Tarenna
- Pavate Adans. = Pavetta
- Santalina Hiern = Coptosperma
- Verulamia DC. ex Poir. = Pavetta
- Wahlenbergia Blume = Tarenna
- Webera Schreb. = Tarenna
- Zygoon Hiern = Coptosperma
