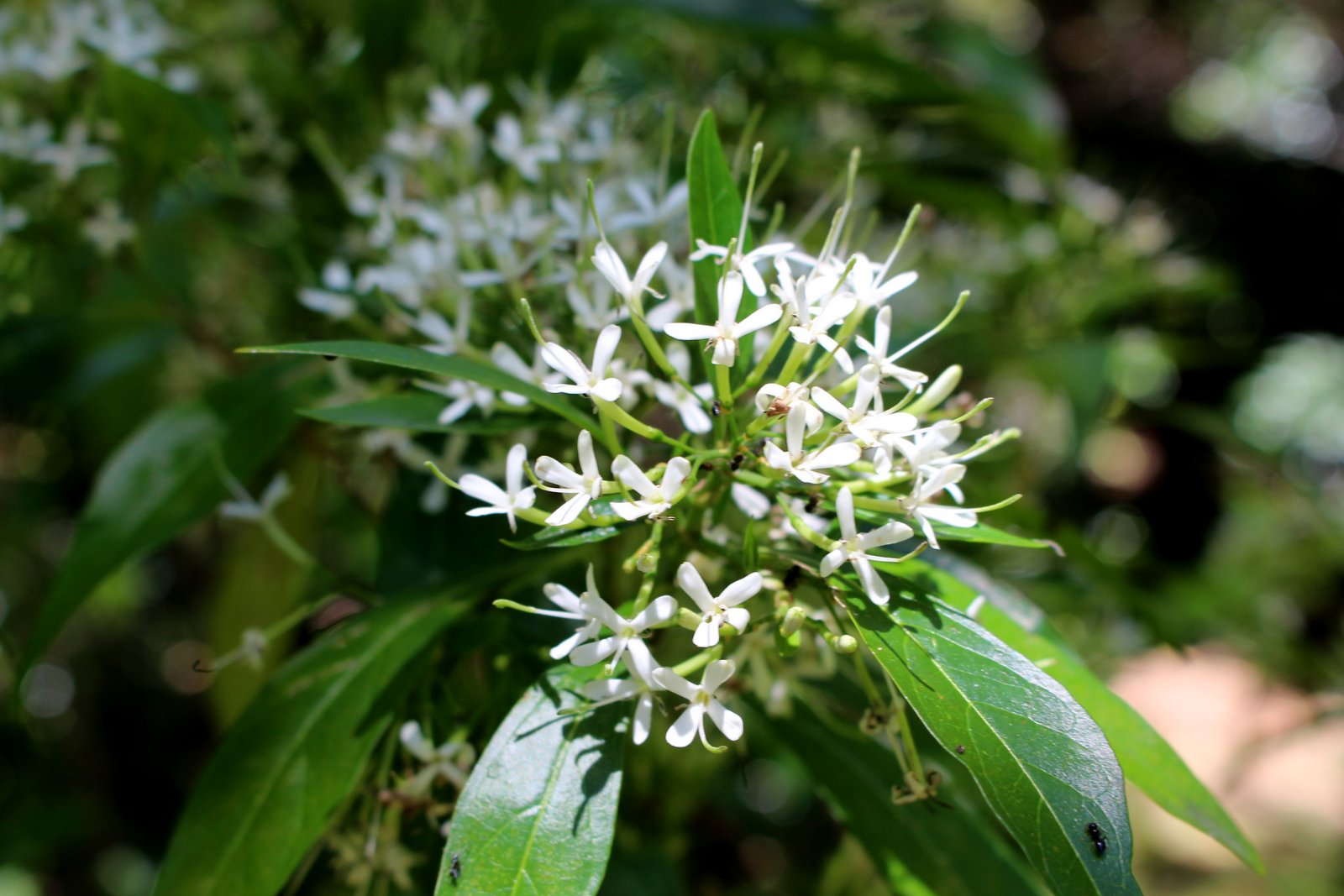
- At Diamond Beach

Conservation status
- Least Concern (NCA)

Scientific classification
- Kingdom: Plantae
- Clade: Tracheophytes
- Clade: Angiosperms
- Clade: Eudicots
- Clade: Asterids
- Order: Gentianales
- Family: Rubiaceae
- Genus: Pavetta
- Species: P. australiensis

Binomial name
- Pavetta australiensis Bremek.

= Pavetta australiensis =

Species of flowering plant

Pavetta australiensis, commonly known as butterfly bush, is a species of flowering plant in the family Rubiaceae, found in drier rainforest areas in northeastern Australia and Papua New Guinea.

== Description ==
Pavetta australiensis is a small shrub up to about 5 m (16 ft) tall with leaves up to about 20 cm (7.9 in) long and 9 cm (3.5 in) wide. Fragrant white flowers are born in panicles at the ends of the twigs. The fruit is a small black drupe containing one or two seeds.

== Distribution and habitat ==
It grows as an understorey shrub in a variety of forest types including beach forest, rainforest and monsoon forest, at altitudes from sea level to about 1,000 m (3,300 ft). The southern limit of its range is the far northeastern corner of New South Wales, extending north along the coast and sub-coastal ranges of Queensland to the top of Cape York Peninsula and into New Guinea.

== Ecology ==
It is highly attractive to pollinators, especially butterflies, which is where is gets the name 'butterfly bush'. In Australia, it is viewed as a better alternative to introduced species, such as Buddleja davidii.

== Etymology ==
The genus name pavetta is derived from the Sinhalese plant name Pawetta. The species epithet australiensis combines 'Australia' with the Latin suffix -ensis meaning 'from' or 'belonging to'.
