= Helictosperma =

Scientific classification
- Kingdom: Plantae
- Clade: Tracheophytes
- Clade: Angiosperms
- Clade: Eudicots
- Clade: Asterids
- Order: Gentianales
- Family: Rubiaceae
- Subfamily: Ixoroideae
- Tribe: Pavetteae
- Genus: Helictosperma; De Block

Genus of plants

Helictosperma is a genus of flowering plants belonging to the family Rubiaceae.

Its native range is Madagascar.

Species:

- Helictosperma malacophyllum (Drake) De Block
- Helictosperma poissonianum Homolle ex De Block
