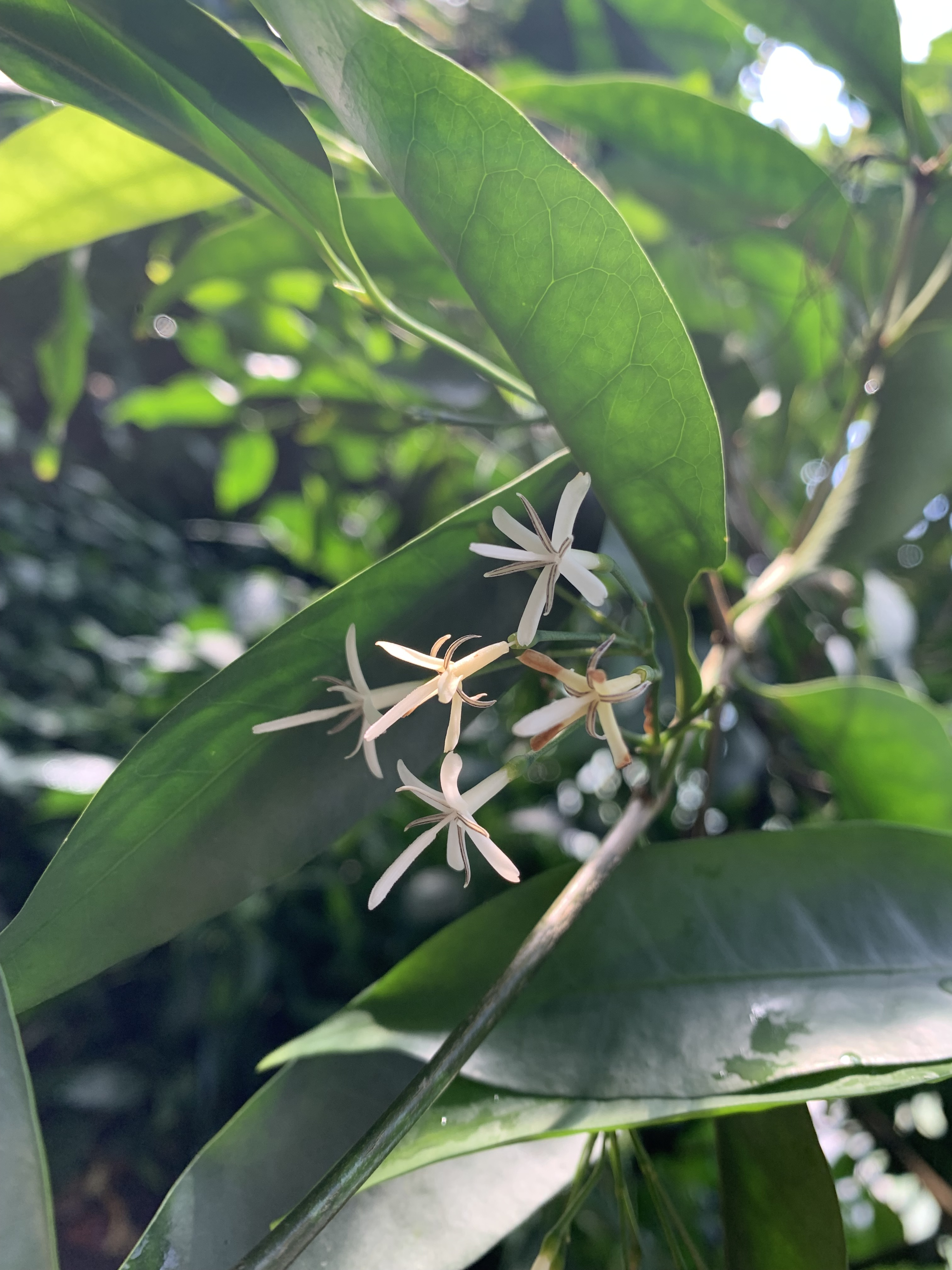
- Tarenna sechellensis, in flower, in the palm house at Royal Botanic Gardens, Kew

Conservation status
- Vulnerable (IUCN 3.1)

Scientific classification
- Kingdom: Plantae
- Clade: Tracheophytes
- Clade: Angiosperms
- Clade: Eudicots
- Clade: Asterids
- Order: Gentianales
- Family: Rubiaceae
- Genus: Tarenna
- Species: T. sechellensis

Binomial name
- Tarenna sechellensis (Baker) Summerh.

= Tarenna sechellensis =

Species of plant

Tarenna sechellensis is a species of plant in the family Rubiaceae. It is known from the Seychelles, Madagascar and Mayotte. The English botanist John Gilbert Baker was the first to formally describe this species in 1877 (in the genus Webera), subsequently V. S. Summerhayes assigned the species to the genus Tarenna.
