= Pavetta brachycalyx =

Conservation status
- Endangered (IUCN 3.1)

Scientific classification
- Kingdom: Plantae
- Clade: Tracheophytes
- Clade: Angiosperms
- Clade: Eudicots
- Clade: Asterids
- Order: Gentianales
- Family: Rubiaceae
- Genus: Pavetta
- Species: P. brachycalyx

Binomial name
- Pavetta brachycalyx Hiern

Synonyms
- Ixora brachycalyx (Hiern) Kuntze; Exechostylus flaviflorus K.Schum.; Pavetta flaviflora (K.Schum.) Hutch. & Dalziel

Species of plant

Pavetta brachycalyx is a species of plant in the family Rubiaceae. It is endemic to Cameroon. Its natural habitats are subtropical or tropical moist lowland forests and subtropical or tropical moist montane forests. It is threatened by habitat loss.
