= Pavetta mollissima =

Conservation status
- Vulnerable (IUCN 2.3)

Scientific classification
- Kingdom: Plantae
- Clade: Tracheophytes
- Clade: Angiosperms
- Clade: Eudicots
- Clade: Asterids
- Order: Gentianales
- Family: Rubiaceae
- Genus: Pavetta
- Species: P. mollissima

Binomial name
- Pavetta mollissima Hutch. & Dalziel

Species of plant

Pavetta mollissima is a species of plant in the family Rubiaceae. It is found in Ghana and possibly Ivory Coast. It is threatened by habitat loss.
