= Pavetta kimberleyana =

Conservation status
- Least Concern (IUCN 3.1)

Scientific classification
- Kingdom: Plantae
- Clade: Tracheophytes
- Clade: Angiosperms
- Clade: Eudicots
- Clade: Asterids
- Order: Gentianales
- Family: Rubiaceae
- Genus: Pavetta
- Species: P. kimberleyana

Binomial name
- Pavetta kimberleyana S.T.Reynolds

Species of plant

Pavetta kimberleyana is a species of plant in the family Rubiaceae. It is native to northern Australia where it is largely restricted to the Kimberley region of north-western Western Australia.

== Description ==
It grows as a shrub or small tree to 4 m, occasionally 8 m, high. It bears white flowers from November to February.

== Distribution and habitat ==
It occurs on red sand or loam soils over laterite or sandstone, behind coastal dunes, along watercourses and on pindan sandplains. It is found in the Central Kimberley, Dampierland, Northern Kimberley, Ord Victoria Plain and Victoria Bonaparte IBRA bioregions.
