= Robbrechtia =

Scientific classification
- Kingdom: Plantae
- Clade: Tracheophytes
- Clade: Angiosperms
- Clade: Eudicots
- Clade: Asterids
- Order: Gentianales
- Family: Rubiaceae
- Genus: Robbrechtia; De Block

Genus of plants

Robbrechtia is a genus of flowering plants belonging to the family Rubiaceae.

It is native to Madagascar.

The genus name of Robbrechtia is in honour of Elmar Robbrecht (b. 1946), a Belgian botanist and mycologist associated with the national botanic gardens. He is also a specialist in Rubiaceae. It was first described and published in Syst. Bot. Vol.28 on page 146 in 2003.

Known species; according to Kew

- Robbrechtia grandifolia De Block
- Robbrechtia milleri De Block
