= Pavetta rubentifolia =

Conservation status
- Critically Endangered (IUCN 3.1)

Scientific classification
- Kingdom: Plantae
- Clade: Tracheophytes
- Clade: Angiosperms
- Clade: Eudicots
- Clade: Asterids
- Order: Gentianales
- Family: Rubiaceae
- Genus: Pavetta
- Species: P. rubentifolia

Binomial name
- Pavetta rubentifolia S.D.Manning

Species of plant

Pavetta rubentifolia is a species of plant in the family Rubiaceae. It is endemic to Cameroon. Its natural habitats are subtropical or tropical moist lowland forests and subtropical or tropical moist montane forests. It is threatened by habitat loss.
