= Pavetta sparsipila =

Conservation status
- Vulnerable (IUCN 2.3)

Scientific classification
- Kingdom: Plantae
- Clade: Tracheophytes
- Clade: Angiosperms
- Clade: Eudicots
- Clade: Asterids
- Order: Gentianales
- Family: Rubiaceae
- Genus: Pavetta
- Species: P. sparsipila

Binomial name
- Pavetta sparsipila Bremek.

Species of plant

Pavetta sparsipila is a species of plant in the family Rubiaceae, endemic to Tanzania. Pavetta sparsipila is classified as Vulnerable (VU) on the IUCN Red List
