= Pavetta monticola =

Conservation status
- Vulnerable (IUCN 2.3)

Scientific classification
- Kingdom: Plantae
- Clade: Tracheophytes
- Clade: Angiosperms
- Clade: Eudicots
- Clade: Asterids
- Order: Gentianales
- Family: Rubiaceae
- Genus: Pavetta
- Species: P. monticola

Binomial name
- Pavetta monticola Hiern

Synonyms
- Ixora monticola (Hiern) Kuntze; Pavetta annobonensis Bremek.; Pavetta baconia var. nigrescens Hiern; Pavetta dermatophylla Mildbr.

Species of plant

Pavetta monticola is a species of plant in the family Rubiaceae. It is found in Equatorial Guinea and São Tomé and Príncipe.
