= Pavetta manyanguensis =

Conservation status
- Vulnerable (IUCN 2.3)

Scientific classification
- Kingdom: Plantae
- Clade: Tracheophytes
- Clade: Angiosperms
- Clade: Eudicots
- Clade: Asterids
- Order: Gentianales
- Family: Rubiaceae
- Genus: Pavetta
- Species: P. manyanguensis

Binomial name
- Pavetta manyanguensis Bridson

Species of plant

Pavetta manyanguensis is a species of plant in the family Rubiaceae. It is endemic to Tanzania.
