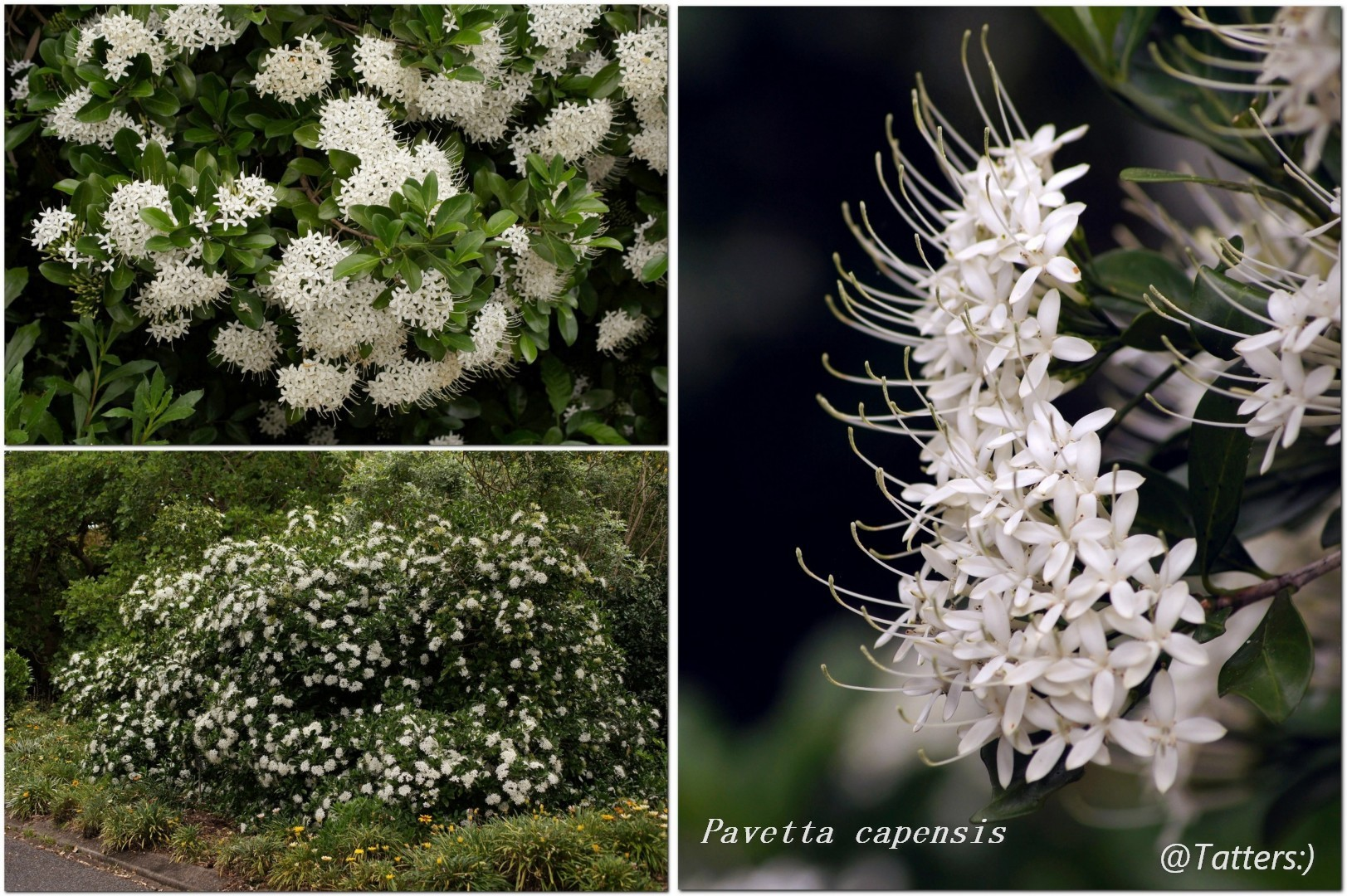

Scientific classification
- Kingdom: Plantae
- Clade: Tracheophytes
- Clade: Angiosperms
- Clade: Eudicots
- Clade: Asterids
- Order: Gentianales
- Family: Rubiaceae
- Genus: Pavetta
- Species: P. capensis

Binomial name
- Pavetta capensis (Houtt.) Bremek.

= Pavetta capensis =

Species of flowering plant

Pavetta capensis, the Cape bride's bush, is a species of plant that was first described by Martinus Houttuyn, and given its current name by Cornelis Eliza Bertus Bremekamp. Pavetta capensis is part of the genus Pavetta and the family Rubiaceae.
