= Pavetta muiriana =

Conservation status
- Endangered (IUCN 3.1)

Scientific classification
- Kingdom: Plantae
- Clade: Tracheophytes
- Clade: Angiosperms
- Clade: Eudicots
- Clade: Asterids
- Order: Gentianales
- Family: Rubiaceae
- Genus: Pavetta
- Species: P. muiriana

Binomial name
- Pavetta muiriana S.D.Manning

Species of plant

Pavetta muiriana is a species of plant in the family Rubiaceae. It is endemic to Cameroon. Its natural habitats are subtropical or tropical moist lowland forests and subtropical or tropical moist montane forests. It is threatened by habitat loss.
