= Cladoceras =

Scientific classification
- Kingdom: Plantae
- Clade: Tracheophytes
- Clade: Angiosperms
- Clade: Eudicots
- Clade: Asterids
- Order: Gentianales
- Family: Rubiaceae
- Subfamily: Ixoroideae
- Tribe: Pavetteae
- Genus: Cladoceras; Bremek.
- Species: C. subcapitatum

Binomial name
- Cladoceras subcapitatum (K.Schum. & K.Krause) Bremek.

Synonyms
- Chomelia subcapitata K.Schum. & K.Krause

Genus of plants

Cladoceras is a monotypic genus of flowering plants in the family Rubiaceae. The genus contains only one species, viz. Cladoceras subcapitatum, which is endemic to eastern Kenya and Tanzania.
