= Pavetta intermedia =

Conservation status
- Vulnerable (IUCN 2.3)

Scientific classification
- Kingdom: Plantae
- Clade: Tracheophytes
- Clade: Angiosperms
- Clade: Eudicots
- Clade: Asterids
- Order: Gentianales
- Family: Rubiaceae
- Genus: Pavetta
- Species: P. intermedia

Binomial name
- Pavetta intermedia Bremek.

Species of plant

Pavetta intermedia is a species of plant in the family Rubiaceae. It is found in the Democratic Republic of the Congo and Uganda.
