= Pavetta blanda =

Scientific classification
- Kingdom: Plantae
- Clade: Tracheophytes
- Clade: Angiosperms
- Clade: Eudicots
- Clade: Asterids
- Order: Gentianales
- Family: Rubiaceae
- Genus: Pavetta
- Species: P. blanda

Binomial name
- Pavetta blanda Bremek.

Species of plant

Pavetta blanda is a species of flowering plant in the family Rubiaceae, native to the Laccadive Islands, south India and Sri Lanka.
