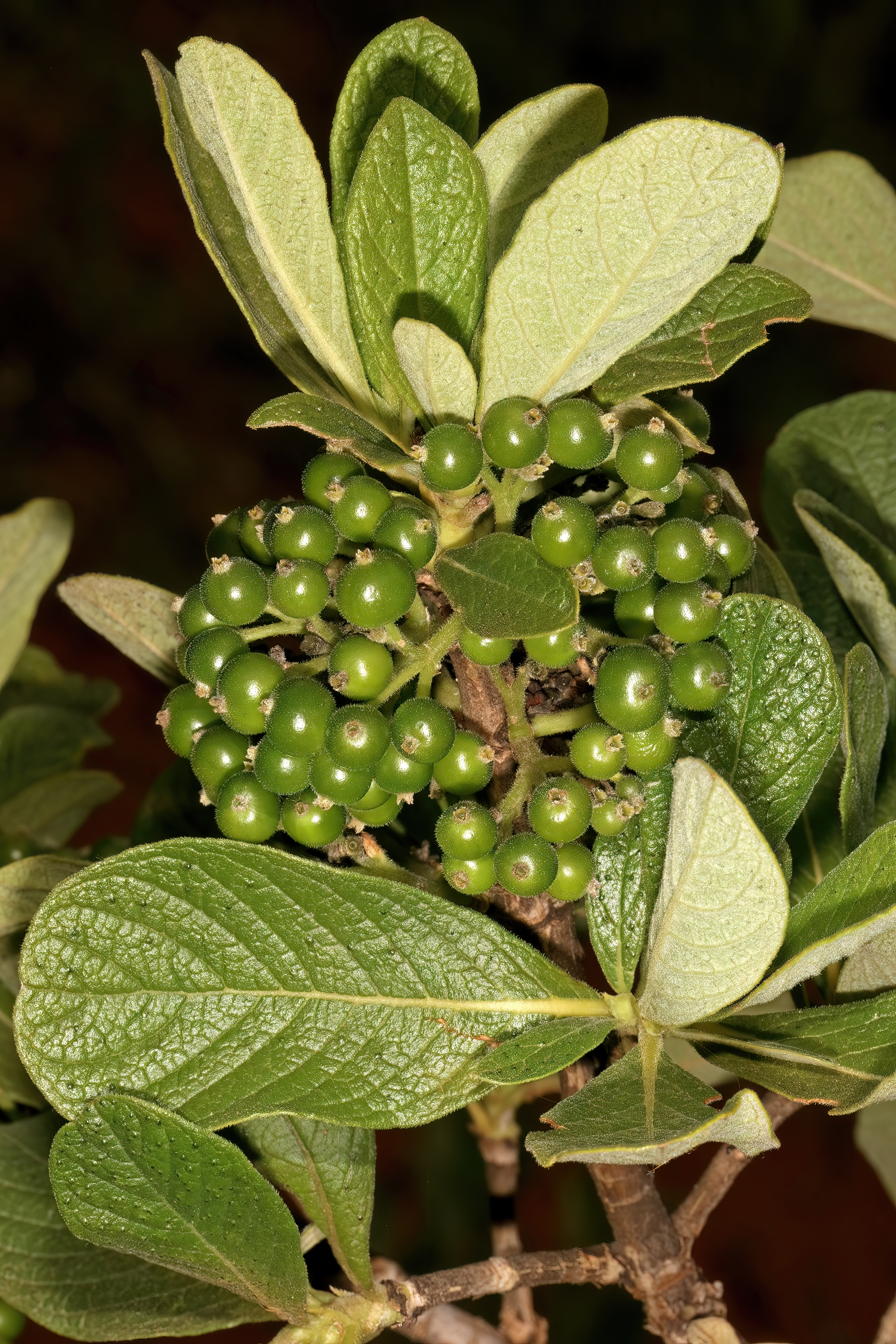

Scientific classification
- Kingdom: Plantae
- Clade: Tracheophytes
- Clade: Angiosperms
- Clade: Eudicots
- Clade: Asterids
- Order: Gentianales
- Family: Rubiaceae
- Genus: Pavetta
- Species: P. schumanniana

Binomial name
- Pavetta schumanniana F.Hoffm. ex K.Schum.

= Pavetta schumanniana =

Species of flowering plant

Pavetta schumanniana, the poison bride's bush, is a species of plant described by F.Hoffm. and Karl Moritz Schumann. Pavetta schumanniana is part of the genus Pavetta and the family Rubiaceae. No subspecies are listed in the Catalog of Life.
