= Pavetta lasioclada =

Conservation status
- Vulnerable (IUCN 2.3)

Scientific classification
- Kingdom: Plantae
- Clade: Tracheophytes
- Clade: Angiosperms
- Clade: Eudicots
- Clade: Asterids
- Order: Gentianales
- Family: Rubiaceae
- Genus: Pavetta
- Species: P. lasioclada

Binomial name
- Pavetta lasioclada (K.Krause) Mildbr. ex Bremek.

Synonyms
- Chomelia lasioclada K.Krause; Pavetta baconia var. hispida Scott Elliot; Pavetta ledermannii K.Krause; Pavetta tisserantii Bremek.; Pavetta viburnoides A.Chev.

Species of plant

Pavetta lasioclada is a species of flowering plant in the family Rubiaceae. It is found in Burkina Faso, Cameroon, Ivory Coast, Ghana, Guinea, Mali, Sierra Leone, and Togo. It is threatened by habitat loss.
