= Pavetta gleniei =

Scientific classification
- Kingdom: Plantae
- Clade: Tracheophytes
- Clade: Angiosperms
- Clade: Eudicots
- Clade: Asterids
- Order: Gentianales
- Family: Rubiaceae
- Genus: Pavetta
- Species: P. gleniei

Binomial name
- Pavetta gleniei Thw. ex. Hook.f.

Species of plant

Pavetta gleniei is a plant commonly found in Sri Lanka.
