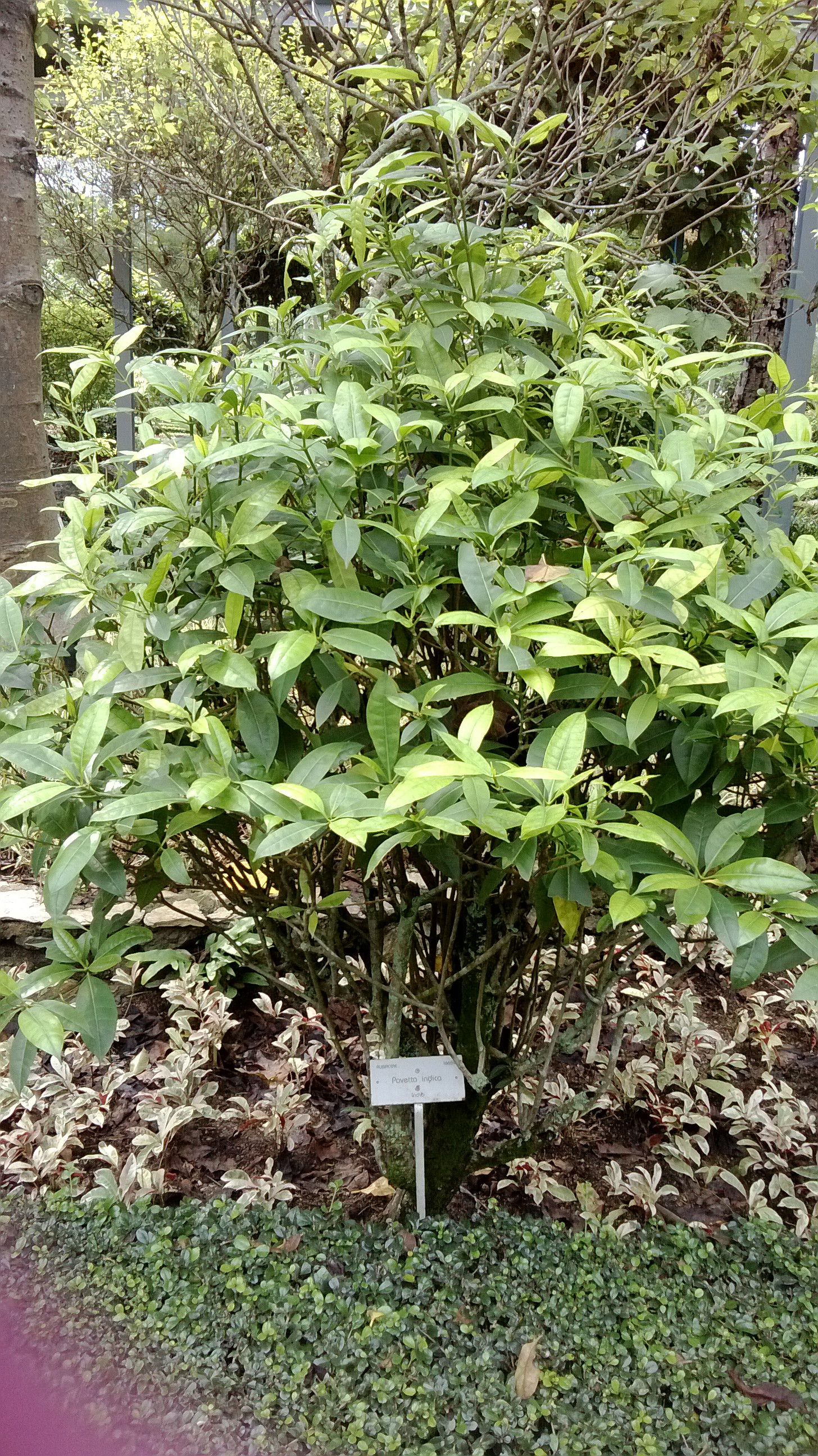
- Nong Nooch Tropical Garden, Thailand

Scientific classification
- Kingdom: Plantae
- Clade: Tracheophytes
- Clade: Angiosperms
- Clade: Eudicots
- Clade: Asterids
- Order: Gentianales
- Family: Rubiaceae
- Genus: Pavetta
- Species: P. indica

Binomial name
- Pavetta indica L.

= Pavetta indica =

Species of plant

Pavetta indica is a plant commonly found in South and Southeast Asia, including in India, Sri Lanka, and Thailand.

== Medicinal uses ==
The entire plant used medicinally as a bitter tonic, diuretic, inflammation, rheumatism, jaundice and ulcer. In the indigenous system of medicine, it is reported that the decoction of the leaves are used to relieve haemorrhoidal pain, as a lotion for nose, analgesic, antipyretic, appetizer and the ulceration of mouth. In literature, it has been reported as an antibacterial, antiviral and antimalarial. It showed analgesic activity for the ethanolic leaf extract on laboratory animals.

It is also used by the Hmong people of northern Thailand in religious ceremonies to communicate with ancestral spirits.
