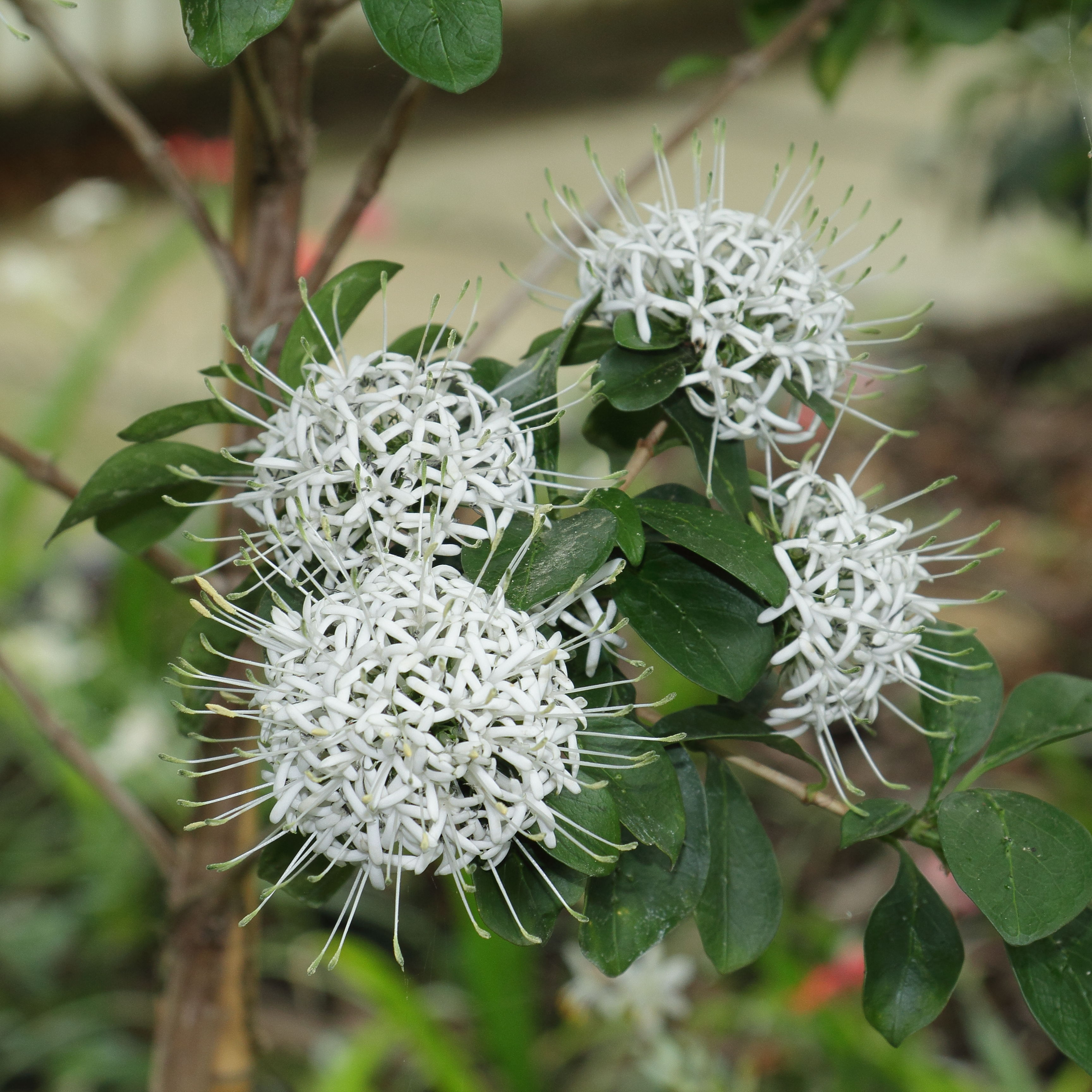
- Pavetta capensis

Scientific classification
- Kingdom: Plantae
- Clade: Embryophytes
- Clade: Tracheophytes
- Clade: Angiosperms
- Clade: Eudicots
- Clade: Asterids
- Order: Gentianales
- Family: Rubiaceae
- Subfamily: Ixoroideae
- Tribe: Pavetteae
- Genus: Pavetta; L.

Type species
- Pavetta indica L.

Synonyms
- Acmostima Raf.; Baconia DC.; Crinita Houtt.; Exechostylus K.Schum.; Pavate Adans.; Verulamia DC. ex Poir.

= Pavetta =

Genus of flowering plants

Pavetta is a genus of flowering plants in the family Rubiaceae. It comprises about 360 species of trees, evergreen shrubs and sub-shrubs. It is found in woodlands, grasslands and thickets in sub-tropical and tropical Africa and Asia. The plants are cultivated for their simple but variable leaves, usually opposite but also occur in triple whorls. The leaves are often membranous with dark bacterial nodules. Pavetta has small, white, tubular flowers, sometimes salviform or funnel-shaped with 4 spreading petal lobes. The flowers are carried on terminal corymbs or cymes.

== Gousiekte ==
Two Pavetta species, Pavetta harborii and Pavetta schummaniana, harbor endophytic Burkholderia bacteria in visible leaf nodules and are known to cause gousiekte, a cardiotoxicosis of ruminants characterised by heart failure four to eight weeks after ingestion of certain rubiaceous plants.

== Species ==
Selected species include:

- Pavetta axillipara Bremek.
- Pavetta blanda Bremek.
- Pavetta brachycalyx Hiern
- Pavetta capensis (Houtt.) Bremek.
- Pavetta gleniei Thwaites ex Hook.f.
- Pavetta holstii K.Schum. ex Engl.
- Pavetta indica L.
- Pavetta intermedia Bremek.
- Pavetta kimberleyana S.T.Reynolds
- Pavetta kupensis S.D.Manning
- Pavetta lasioclada (K.Krause) Mildbr. ex Bremek.
- Pavetta linearifolia Bremek.
- Pavetta lynesii Bridson
- Pavetta manyanguensis Bridson
- Pavetta mollissima Hutch. & Dalziel
- Pavetta monticola Hiern
- Pavetta muiriana S.D.Manning
- Pavetta nitidissima Bridson
- Pavetta rubentifolia S.D.Manning
- Pavetta schumanniana F.Hoffm. ex K.Schum.
- Pavetta sparsipila Bremek.
- Pavetta tarennoides S.Moore

== Pictures ==
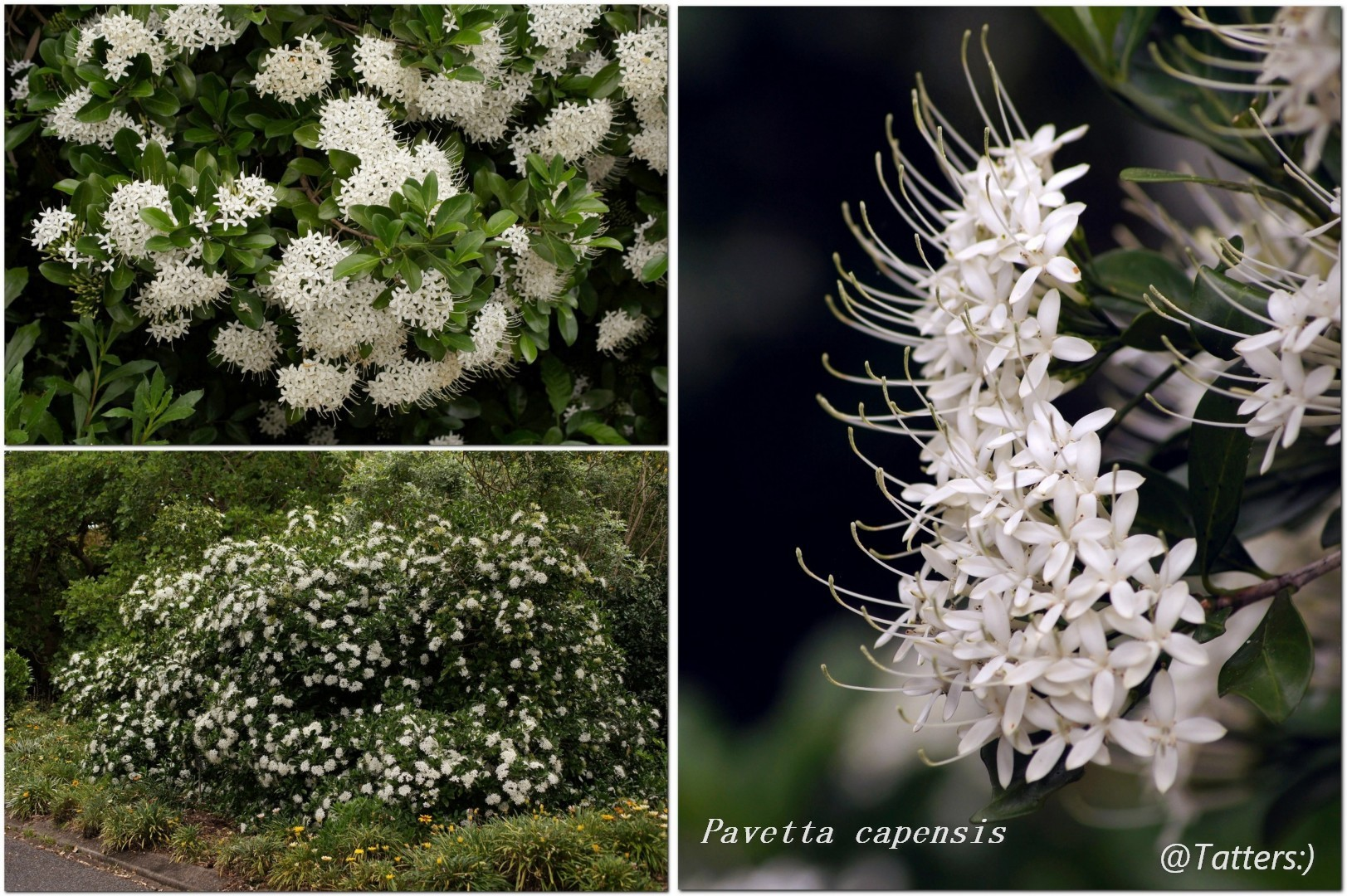
Pavetta capensis

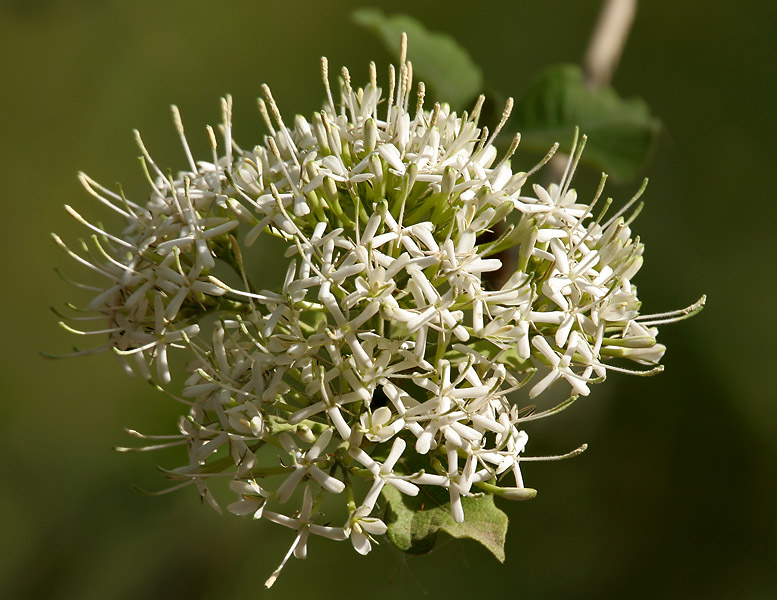
Pavetta crassicaulis

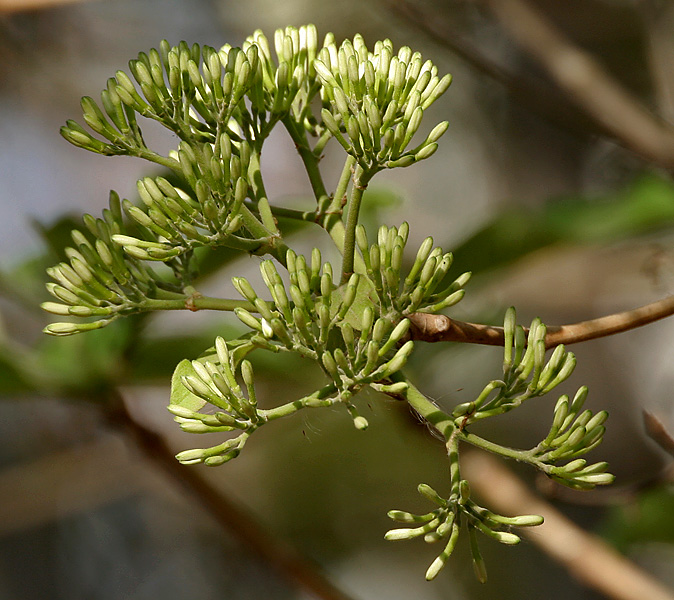
Pavetta crassicaulis

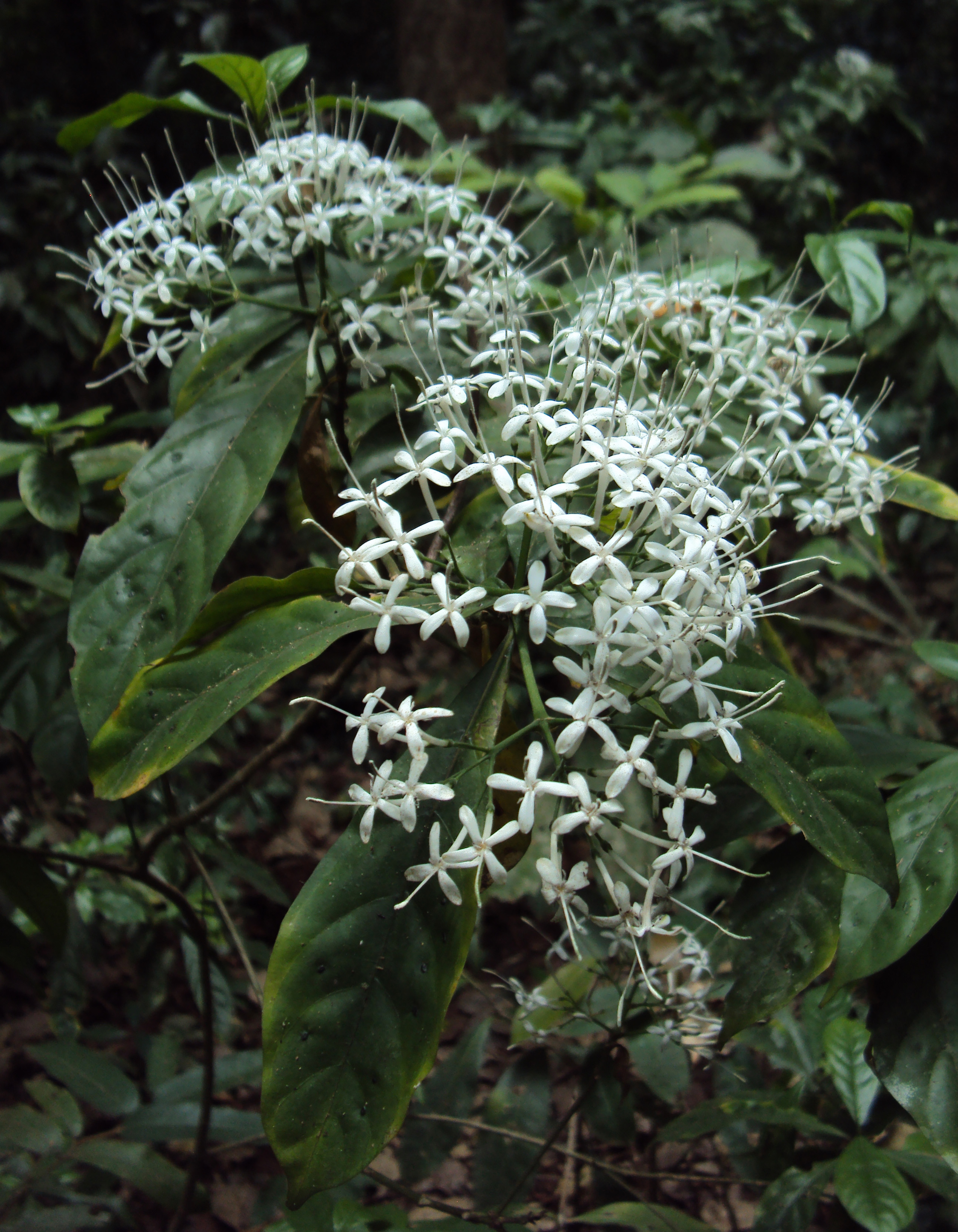
Pavetta indica

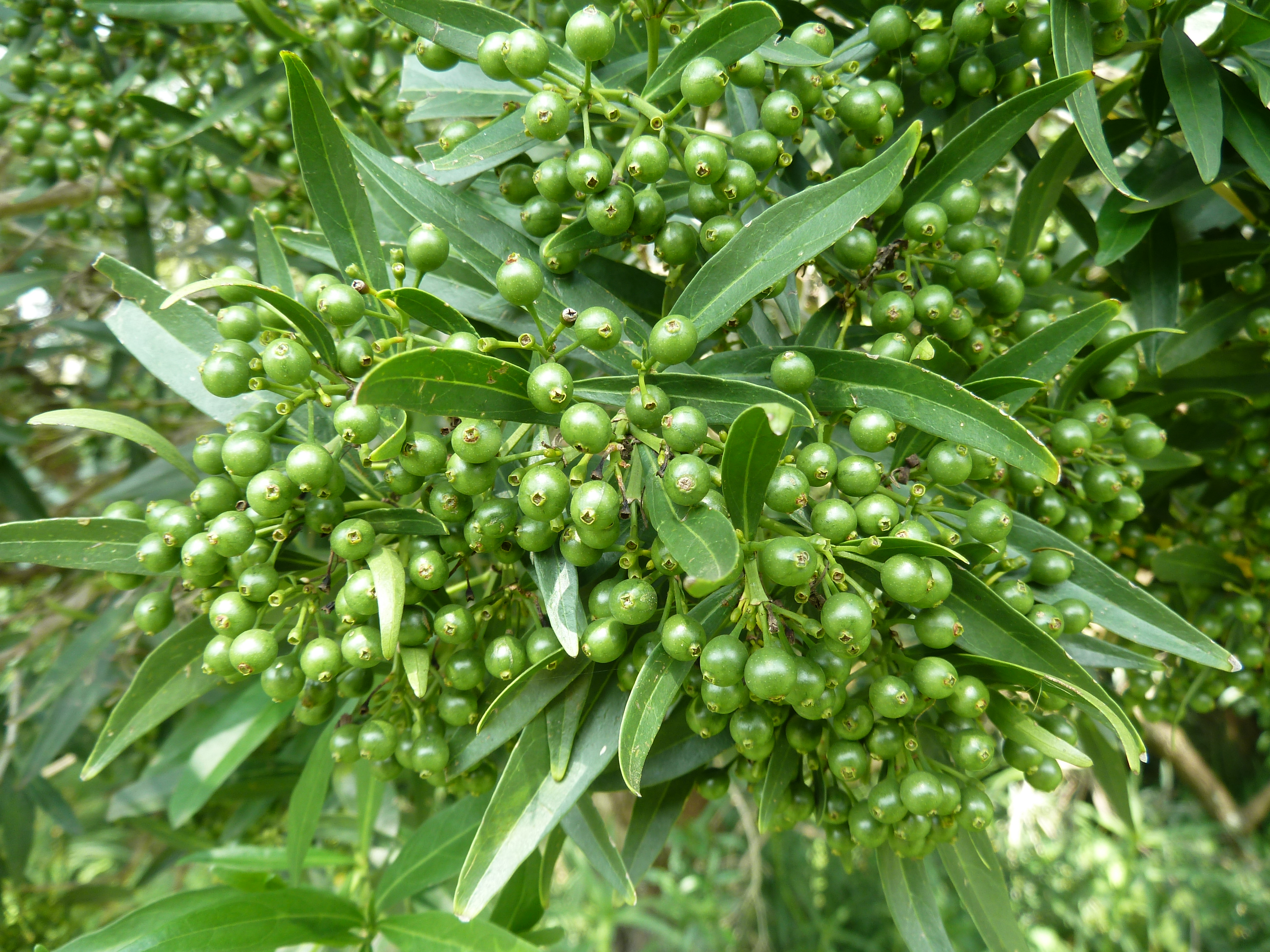
Pavetta lanceolata

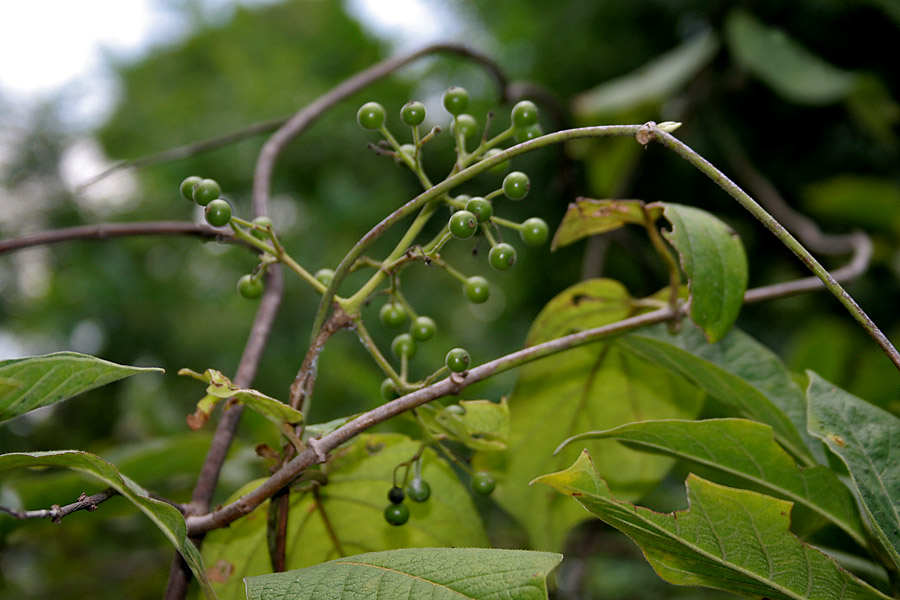
Pavetta tomentosa
