= Gynochthodes hollrungiana =

Scientific classification
- Kingdom: Plantae
- Clade: Tracheophytes
- Clade: Angiosperms
- Clade: Eudicots
- Clade: Asterids
- Order: Gentianales
- Family: Rubiaceae
- Genus: Gynochthodes
- Species: G. hollrungiana

Binomial name
- Gynochthodes hollrungiana (Valeton) Razafim. & B.Bremer

Synonyms
- Morinda hollrungiana Valeton

Species of plant

Gynochthodes hollrungiana is a plant in the family Rubiaceae. Ii is found only in New Guinea.

== Taxonomy ==
G. hollrungiana was first described by Theodoric Valeton in 1927 as Morinda hollrungiana. In 2011, based on new molecular studies, the genera, Morinda and Gynochthodes, were redescribed, which necessitated new combinations and names for species in these genera. This resulted in Morinda hollrungiana being assigned to the genus Gynochthodes by Sylvain Razafimandimbison and Birgitta Bremer.

== Etymology ==
The species epithet, hollrungiana, honours Max Hollrung, a German botanist who collected in Kaiser Wilhelms Land (New Guinea) and who collected the type specimen of Morinda hollrungiana.
