= Coelopyrena =

Scientific classification
- Kingdom: Plantae
- Clade: Tracheophytes
- Clade: Angiosperms
- Clade: Eudicots
- Clade: Asterids
- Order: Gentianales
- Family: Rubiaceae
- Subfamily: Rubioideae
- Tribe: Morindeae
- Genus: Coelopyrena; Valeton
- Species: C. salicifolia

Binomial name
- Coelopyrena salicifolia Valeton

Genus of plants

Coelopyrena is a monotypic genus of flowering plants in the family Rubiaceae. The genus contains only one species, viz. Coelopyrena salicifolia, which is endemic to the Maluku Islands.
