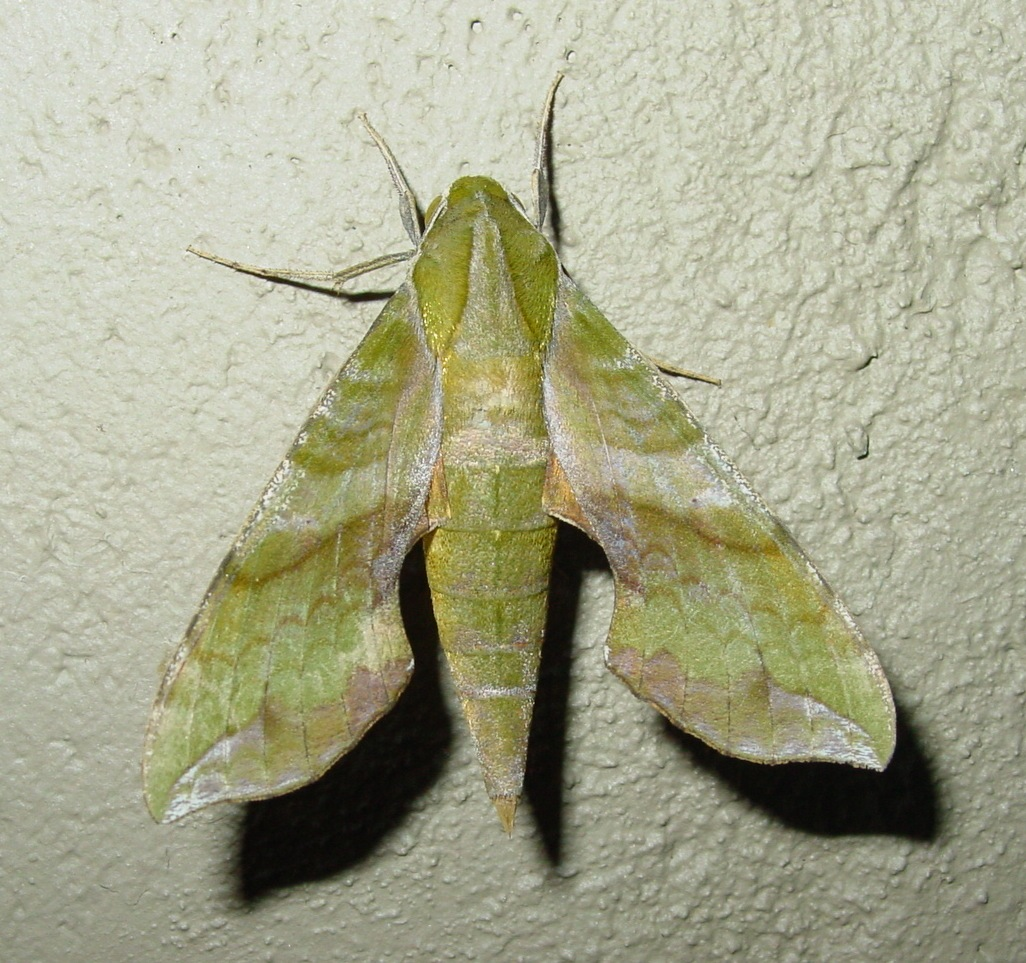

Conservation status
- Apparently Secure (NatureServe)

Scientific classification
- Kingdom: Animalia
- Phylum: Arthropoda
- Class: Insecta
- Order: Lepidoptera
- Family: Sphingidae
- Genus: Xylophanes
- Species: X. pluto

Binomial name
- Xylophanes pluto (Fabricius, 1777)

Synonyms
- Sphinx pluto Fabricius, 1777; Sphinx croesus Dalman, 1823; Calliomma ochracea Walker, 1856; Oreus thorates Hübner, 1831

= Xylophanes pluto =

Pluto sphinx

Species of moth

Xylophanes pluto, the Pluto sphinx, is a moth of the family Sphingidae. The species was first described by Johan Christian Fabricius in 1777.

== Distribution ==
It is native to the Americas, where it occurs from Argentina and Paraguay northward through Bolivia and the tropical and subtropical lowlands of Brazil, continuing through Central America to Mexico, the West Indies, southern Florida, and southern Texas.

== Description ==
The wingspan is 53–65 mm. The prominent broad chrome-yellow band distinguishes this species from all other Xylophaness. The thorax is green. The abdomen has a thin medial line, interrupted at the base of each segment by a metallic yellow dot. The lateral lines are also present. The thorax and abdomen are maize yellow, with metallic yellow scales, a few of which are also found dorso-laterally.

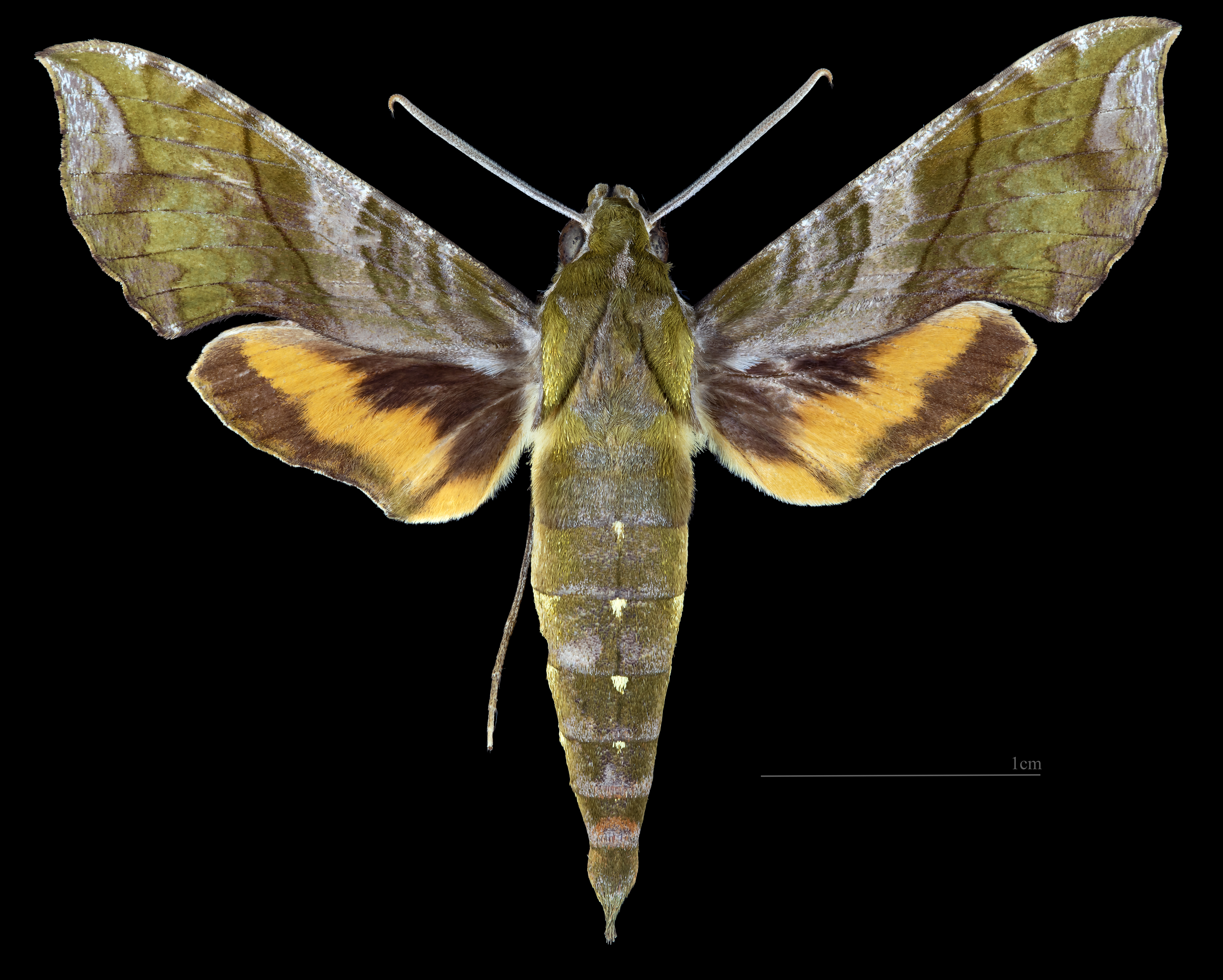
Male dorsal

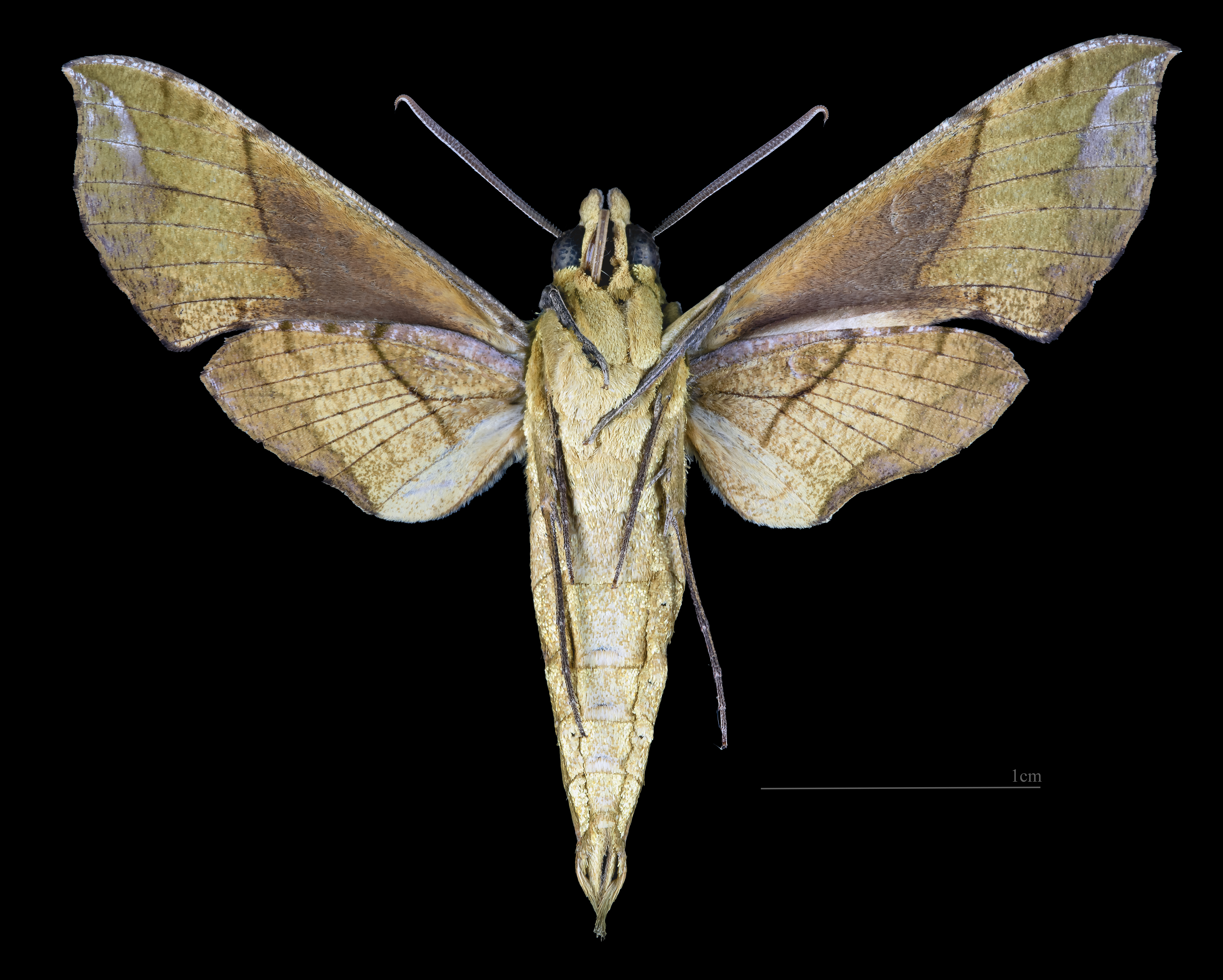
Male ventral

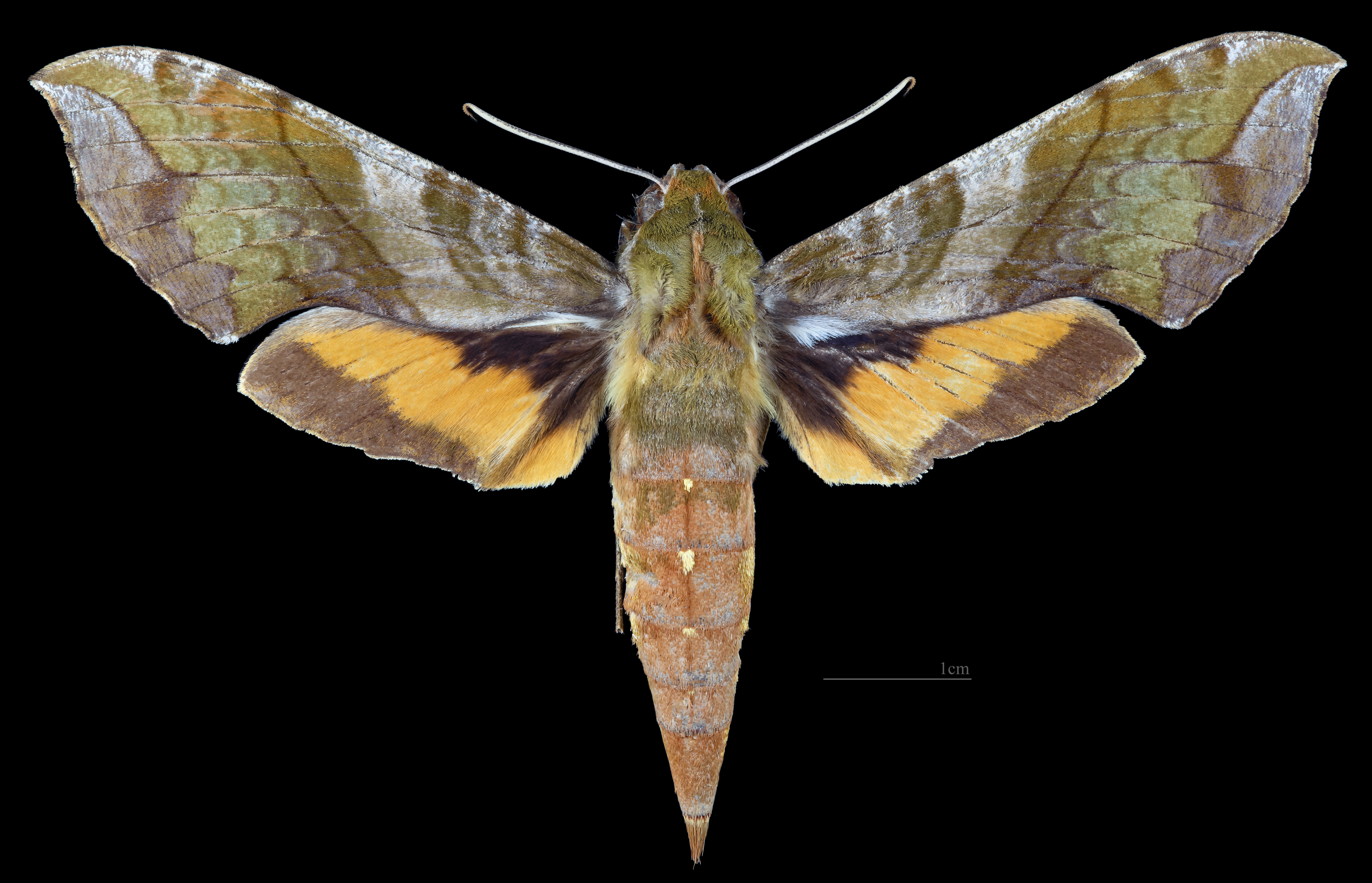
Female doral

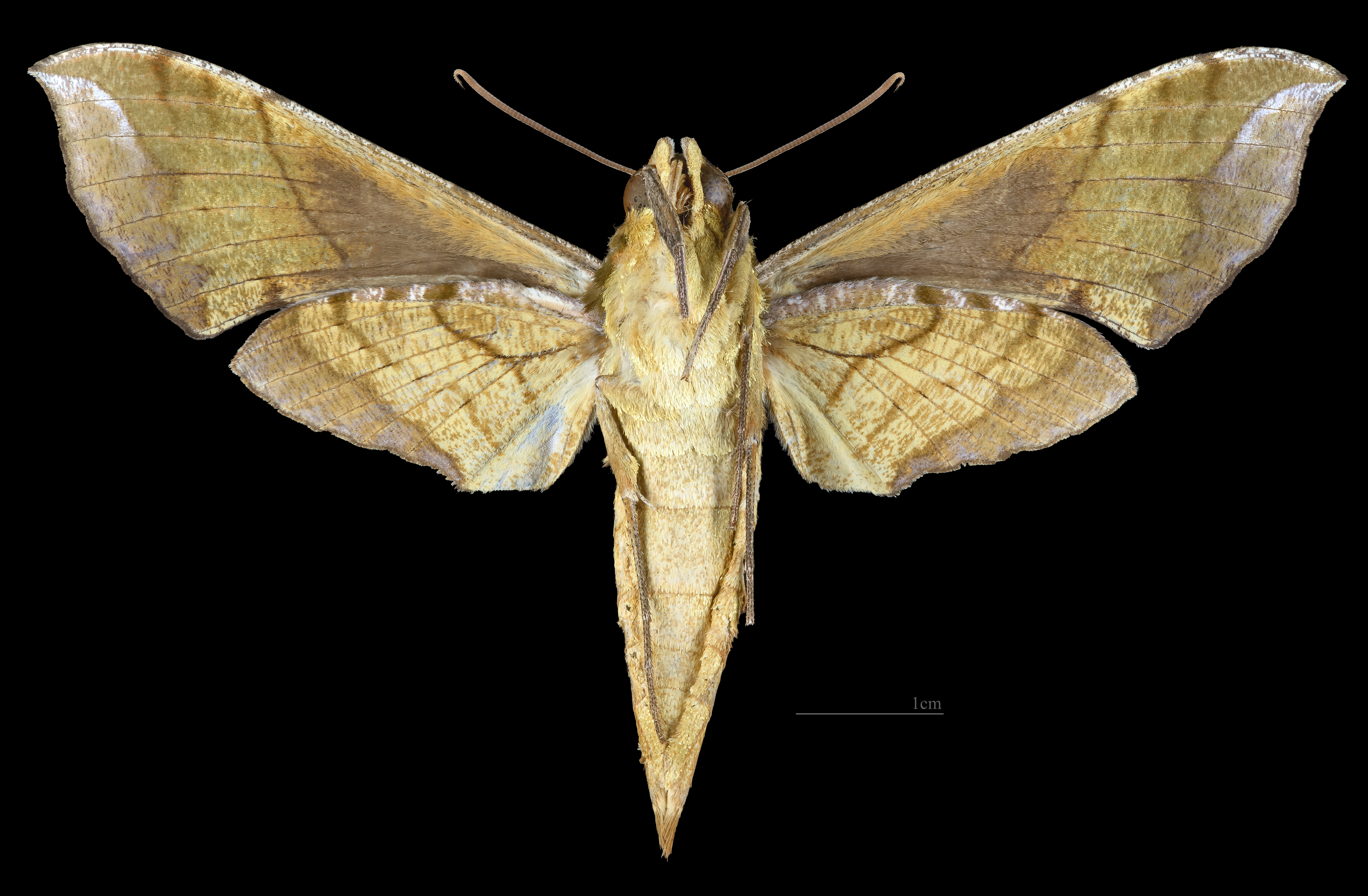
Female ventral

== Biology ==
There are multiple generations per year in Florida and Texas. Adults are on wing year round in the tropics.

The larvae feed on Chiococca and Erythroxylum species, and Hamelia patens and Morinda royoc.
