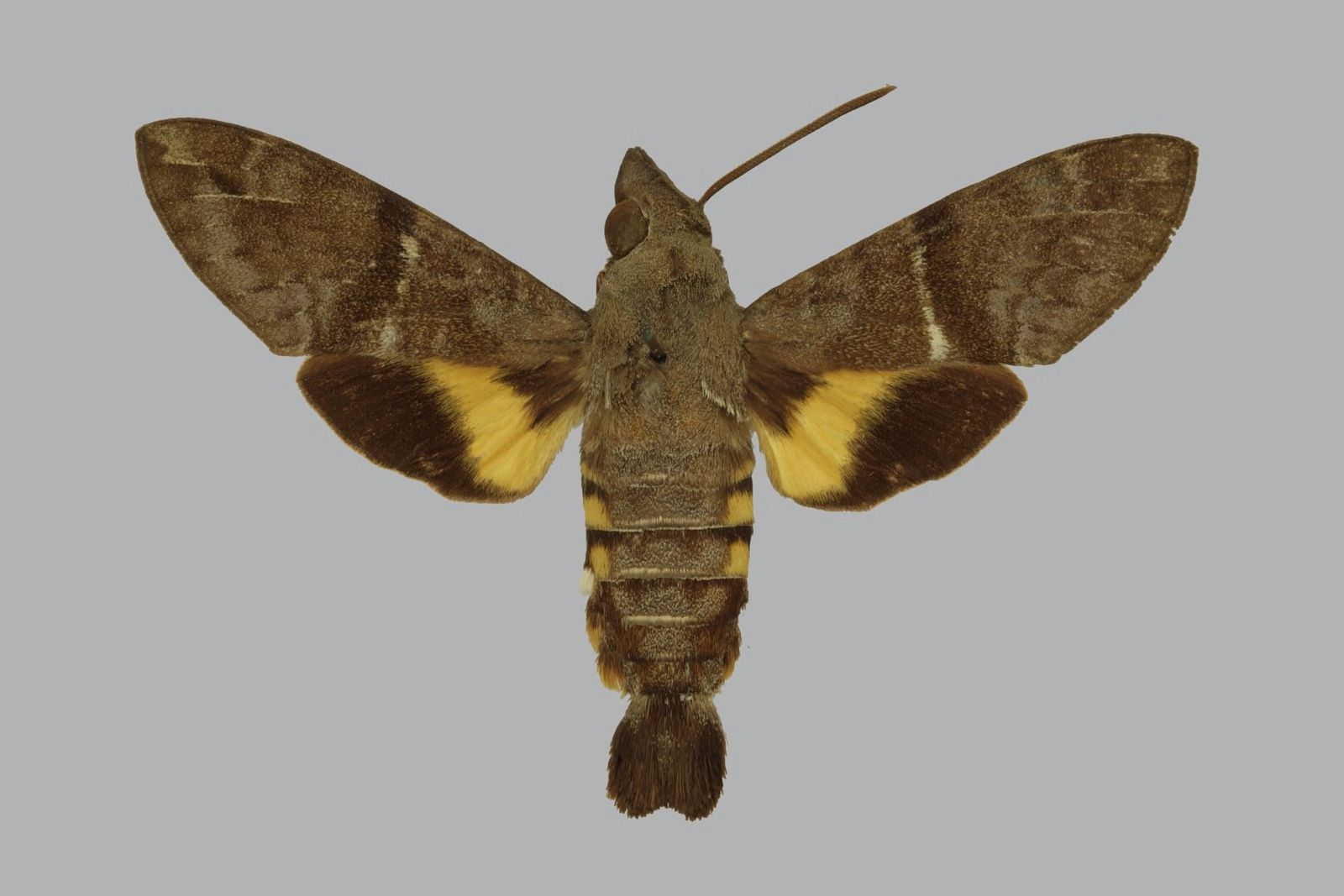
- Macroglossum rectans

Scientific classification
- Kingdom: Animalia
- Phylum: Arthropoda
- Class: Insecta
- Order: Lepidoptera
- Family: Sphingidae
- Genus: Macroglossum
- Species: M. rectans

Binomial name
- Macroglossum rectans Rothschild & Jordan, 1903

= Macroglossum rectans =

Species of moth

Macroglossum rectans is a moth of the family Sphingidae. It is known from Papua New Guinea and Australia.

It is similar to Macroglossum hirundo errans, but less grey. The abdomen upperside has a small, transverse, yellow lateral mark on second segment and a large one on the third and fourth. The side tufts on segments five and six are light brownish yellow rather than white. The forewing upperside has an oblique median grey band. Both wing undersides are more reddish brown than in Macroglossum hirundo errans.
