= Strongback =

Strongback may refer to:

- Strongback (girder), a beam or girder which acts as a secondary support member to existing structure
- Strongback, the band formed by two former members of Palladium (British band) in 2009
- Strongback, any one of at least three Caribbean herbs, Morinda royoc, Desmodium abscendens, and Cuphea parsonsia
- Strongback, the Java libraries and framework introduced by FIRST Robotics team 4931
