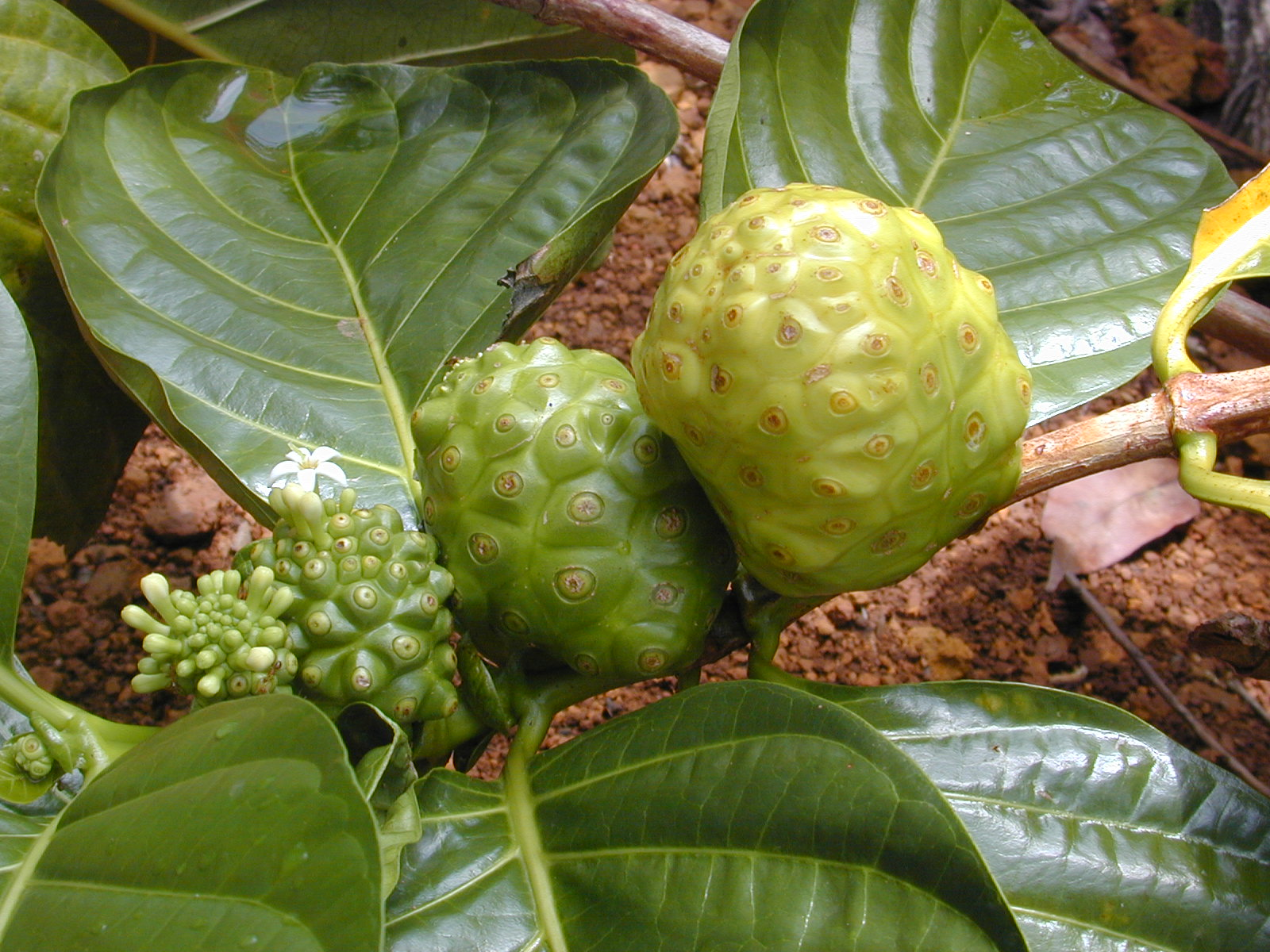
- Morinda citrifolia
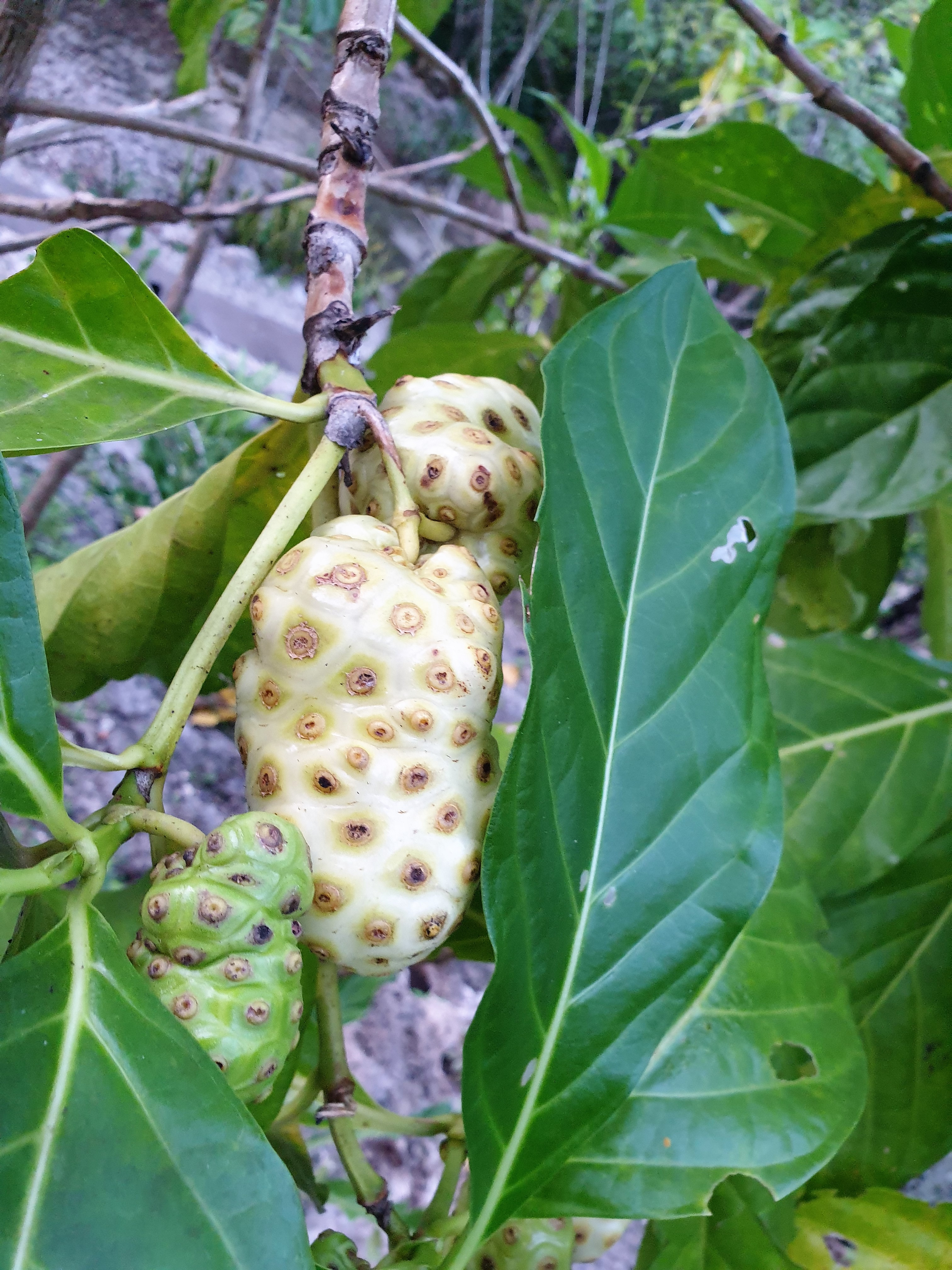
- Morinda yucatanensis

Scientific classification
- Kingdom: Plantae
- Clade: Tracheophytes
- Clade: Angiosperms
- Clade: Eudicots
- Clade: Asterids
- Order: Gentianales
- Family: Rubiaceae
- Subfamily: Rubioideae
- Tribe: Morindeae
- Genus: Morinda; L.

Species
- See text

Synonyms
- Appunettia R.D.Good; Belicea Lundell; Rojoc Adans.; Sarcopygme Setch. & Christoph.

= Morinda =

Genus of flowering plants

Morinda is a genus of flowering plants in the madder family, Rubiaceae. The generic name is derived from the Latin words morus 'mulberry', referring to the appearance of the fruits, and indica, meaning 'of India'.

== Description ==
Distributed in all tropical regions of the world, Morinda includes 80 species of trees, shrubs or vines. All Morinda species bear aggregate or multiple fruits that can be fleshy (like Morinda citrifolia) or dry. Most species of this genus originate in the area of Borneo, New Guinea, Northern Australia and New Caledonia.

In traditional Japanese, Korean and Chinese medicine, Morinda citrifolia is considered to be a herb with biological properties, although there is no confirmed evidence of clinical efficacy.

== Fossil record ==
The first fossil record for genus Morinda is from fruit of Morinda chinensis found in coal dated from the Eocene 56 to 33.9 million years ago in the Changchang Basin of Hainan Island, South China.

== Species ==
As of January 2026, Plants of the World Online accepts the following 39 species:

- Morinda angolensis (R.D.Good) F.White
- Morinda angustifolia Roxb.
- Morinda asteroscepa K.Schum.
- Morinda bracteata Roxb.
- Morinda buchii Urb.
- Morinda carnosa Venturina, E.E.L.Suarez & Alejandro
- Morinda chrysorhiza (Thonn.) DC.
- Morinda citrifolia L.
- Morinda corneri K.M.Wong
- Morinda elliptica (Hook.f.) Ridl.
- Morinda fasciculata Benth.
- Morinda hoffmannioides Standl.
- Morinda latibractea Valeton
- Morinda leiantha Kurz
- Morinda longiflora G.Don
- Morinda longipetiolata Steyerm.
- Morinda longissima Y.Z.Ruan
- Morinda lucida Benth.
- Morinda mefou Cheek
- Morinda moaensis Alain
- Morinda morindoides (Baker) Milne-Redh.
- Morinda nana Craib
- Morinda pacifica (Reinecke) Razafim. & B.Bremer
- Morinda panamensis Seem.
- Morinda pedunculata Valeton
- Morinda persicifolia Buch.-Ham.
- Morinda piperiformis Miq.
- Morinda pubescens Sm.
- Morinda ramosa (Lauterb.) Razafim. & B.Bremer
- Morinda rosiflora Y.Z.Ruan
- Morinda royoc L.
- Morinda scabrida Craib
- Morinda schultzei Valeton
- Morinda sessiliflora Bertol.
- Morinda talmyi (Pit.) Chantar.
- Morinda titanophylla E.M.A.Petit
- Morinda tomentosa B.Heyne ex Roth
- Morinda turbacensis Kunth
- Morinda undulata Y.Z.Ruan

=== Formerly placed here ===
- Morinda jasminoides – now Gynochthodes jasminoides
- Morinda officinalis – now Gynochthodes officinalis
- Morinda trimera – now Gynochthodes trimera.
- Morinda muscosa – now Palicourea muscosa
