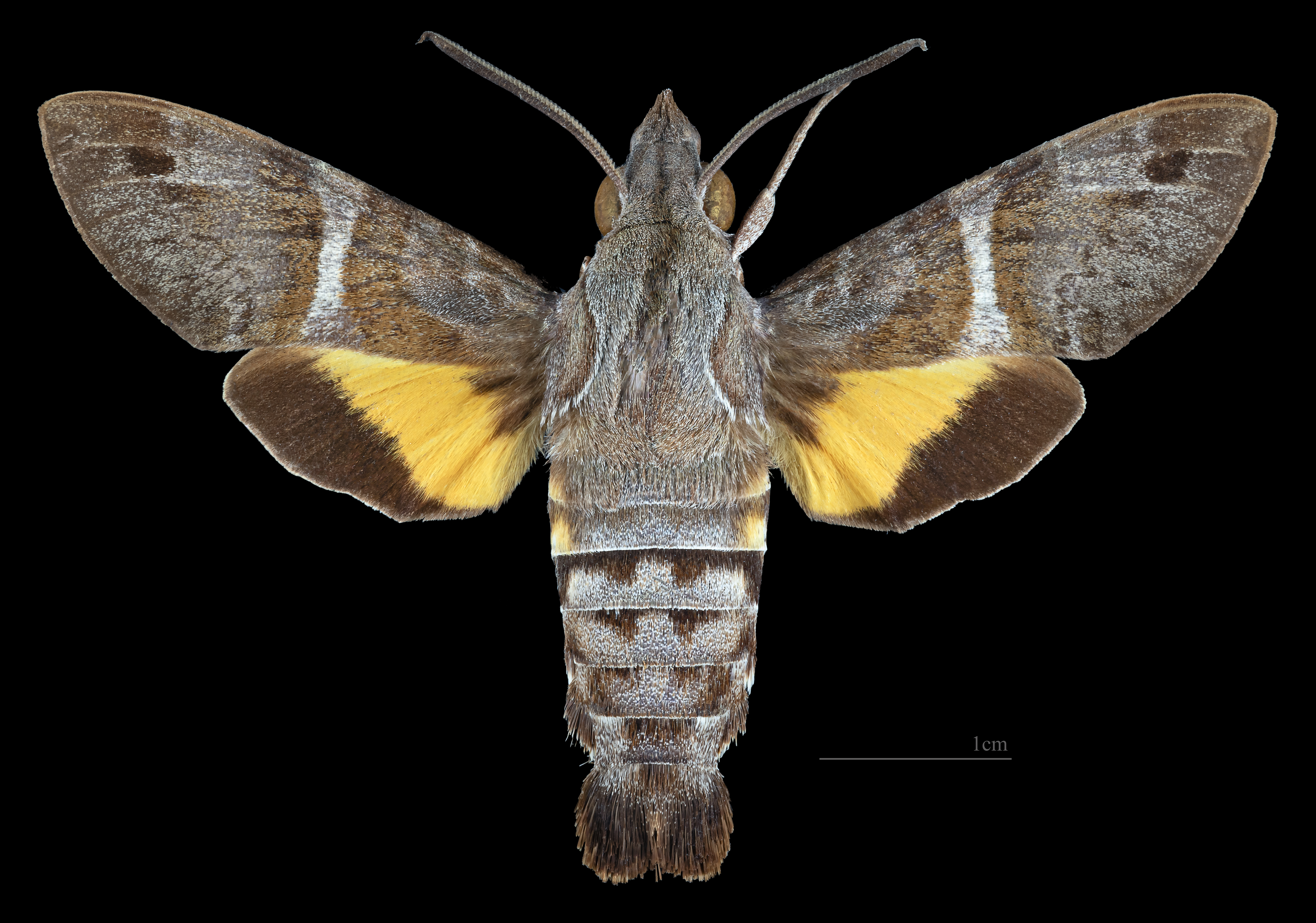
- Macroglossum hirundo male dorsal
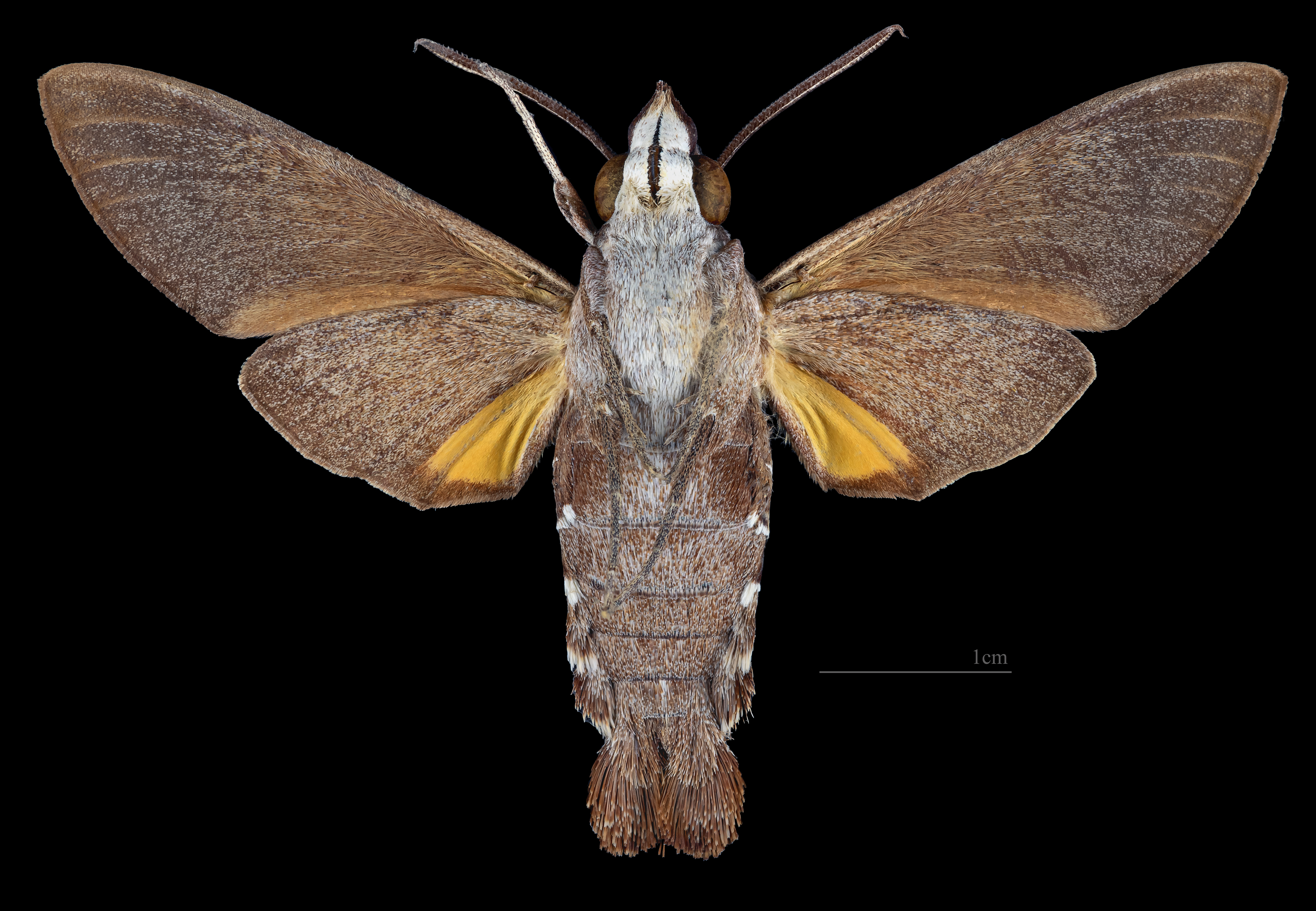
- Macroglossum hirundo male ventral

Scientific classification
- Kingdom: Animalia
- Phylum: Arthropoda
- Class: Insecta
- Order: Lepidoptera
- Family: Sphingidae
- Genus: Macroglossum
- Species: M. hirundo

Binomial name
- Macroglossum hirundo Boisduval, 1832

Synonyms
- Leucostrophus hirundo; Macroglossa cinerascens Butler, 1884; Macroglossa belinda Pagenstecher, 1900; Macroglossum tinnunculus Boisduval, 1875; Macroglossum navigatorum Rebel, 1915; Rhamphoschisma scottiarum R. Felder, 1874; Macroglossum hirundo vitiense Rothschild & Jordan, 1903; Macroglossum hirundo tonganum Gehlen, 1930; Macroglossum hirundo samoanum Rothschild & Jordan, 1906; Macroglossum hirundo interrupta Closs, 1911

= Macroglossum hirundo =

Species of moth

Macroglossum hirundo is a moth of the family Sphingidae. It is known from the Cook Islands, Fiji, the Society Islands, Australia (the Northern Territory, Queensland and New South Wales), Papua New Guinea, the Bismarck Archipelago and the Solomon Islands.

The wingspan is about 40 mm.

They larvae feed on various Rubiaceae species, including Canthium odoratum, Coelospermum reticulatum, Coprosma repens, Morinda jasminoides, Myrmecodia beccarii, Pavetta australiensis and Psychotria loniceroides.

== Subspecies ==
- Macroglossum hirundo hirundo
- Macroglossum hirundo errans Walker, 1856 (Papua New Guinea)
- Macroglossum hirundo lifuensis Rothschild, 1894 (New Caledonia)
