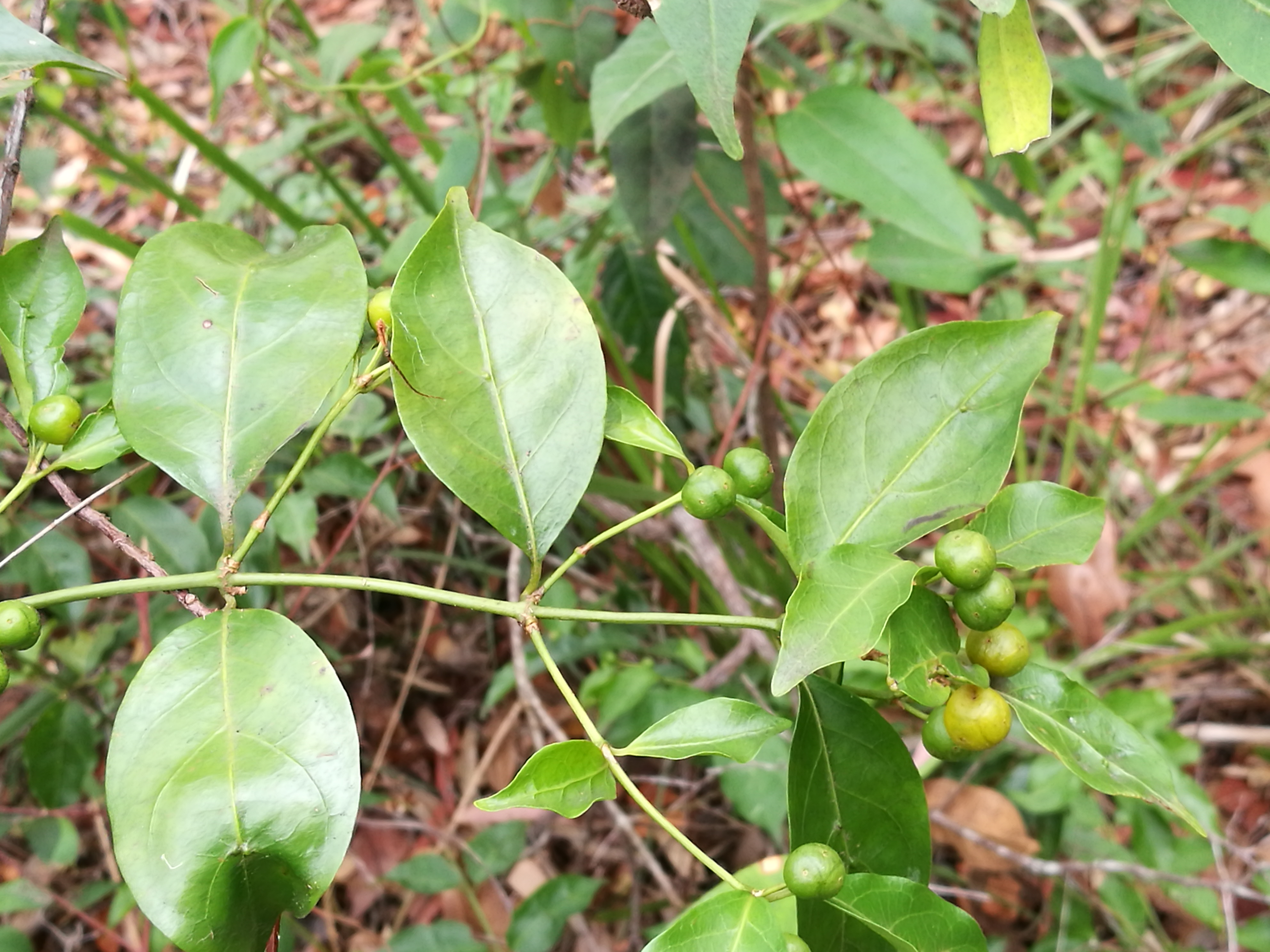
- Gynochthodes jasminoides

Scientific classification
- Kingdom: Plantae
- Clade: Tracheophytes
- Clade: Angiosperms
- Clade: Eudicots
- Clade: Asterids
- Order: Gentianales
- Family: Rubiaceae
- Subfamily: Rubioideae
- Tribe: Morindeae
- Genus: Gynochthodes; Blume

Synonyms
- Guttenbergia Zoll. & Moritzi; Imantina Hook.f.; Pogonanthus Montrouz.; Sphaerophora Blume; Stigmanthus Lour.; Tetralopha Hook.f.

= Gynochthodes =

Genus of plants

Gynochthodes is a genus of flowering plants in the family Rubiaceae. The genus is found from Madagascar to tropical and subtropical Asia and the Pacific region.

== Species ==
- Gynochthodes alejandroi Razafim. & B.Bremer
- Gynochthodes ammitia (Halford & A.J.Ford) Razafim. & B.Bremer
- Gynochthodes artensis (Montrouz.) Razafim. & B.Bremer
- Gynochthodes australiensis J.T.Johanss.
- Gynochthodes badia (Y.Z.Ruan) Razafim. & B.Bremer
- Gynochthodes bartlingii (Elmer) Razafim. & B.Bremer
- Gynochthodes billardierei (Baill.) Razafim. & B.Bremer
- Gynochthodes boninensis (Ohwi) E.Oguri & T.Sugaw
- Gynochthodes brevipes (S.Y.Hu) Razafim. & B.Bremer
- Gynochthodes bucidifolia (A.Gray) Razafim. & B.Bremer
- Gynochthodes calciphila (K.M.Wong) Razafim. & B.Bremer
- Gynochthodes callicarpifolia (Y.Z.Ruan) Razafim. & B.Bremer
- Gynochthodes candollei (Montrouz.) Razafim. & B.Bremer
- Gynochthodes canthoides (F.Muell.) Razafim. & B.Bremer
- Gynochthodes celebica (Miq.) Razafim. & B.Bremer
- Gynochthodes cinnamomea (Craib) Razafim. & B.Bremer
- Gynochthodes cinnamomifoliata (Y.Z.Ruan) Razafim. & B.Bremer
- Gynochthodes citrina (Y.Z.Ruan) Razafim. & B.Bremer
- Gynochthodes cochinchinensis (DC.) Razafim. & B.Bremer
- Gynochthodes collina (Schltr.) Razafim. & B.Bremer
- Gynochthodes constipata (Halford & A.J.Ford) Razafim. & B.Bremer
- Gynochthodes coriacea Blume
- Gynochthodes costata (Merr. & L.M.Perry) Razafim. & B.Bremer
- Gynochthodes decipiens (Schltr.) Razafim. & B.Bremer
- Gynochthodes deplanchei (Hook.f.) Razafim. & B.Bremer
- Gynochthodes elliptifolia (Quisumb. & Merr.) Razafim. & B.Bremer
- Gynochthodes elmeri (Merr. & L.M.Perry) Razafim. & B.Bremer
- Gynochthodes epiphytica (Rech.) A.C.Sm. & S.P.Darwin
- Gynochthodes gjellerupii (Valeton) Razafim. & B.Bremer
- Gynochthodes glaucescens (Schltr.) Razafim. & B.Bremer
- Gynochthodes glomerata (Blume) Razafim. & B.Bremer
- Gynochthodes grayi (Seem.) Razafim. & B.Bremer
- Gynochthodes hainanensis (Merr. & F.C.How) Razafim. & B.Bremer
- Gynochthodes hirtella (Merr. & L.M.Perry) Razafim. & B.Bremer
- Gynochthodes hispida (K.M.Wong) Razafim. & B.Bremer
- Gynochthodes hollrungiana (Valeton) Razafim. & B.Bremer
- Gynochthodes howiana (S.Y.Hu) Razafim. & B.Bremer
- Gynochthodes hupehensis (S.Y.Hu) Razafim. & B.Bremer
- Gynochthodes jackiana (Korth.) Razafim. & B.Bremer
- Gynochthodes jasminoides (A.Cunn.) Razafim. & B.Bremer
- Gynochthodes kanalensis (Baill. & Guillaumin) Razafim. & B.Bremer
- Gynochthodes lacunosa (King & Gamble) Razafim. & B.Bremer
- Gynochthodes lanuginosa (Suratman) K.M.Wong & Razafim.
- Gynochthodes lenticellata (C.B.Rob.) Merr.
- Gynochthodes leonardii J.G.Chavez
- Gynochthodes leparensis (Valeton) Razafim. & B.Bremer
- Gynochthodes leptocalama (Wernham) Razafim. & B.Bremer
- Gynochthodes litseifolia (Y.Z.Ruan) Razafim. & B.Bremer
- Gynochthodes macrophylla Kurz
- Gynochthodes micrantha (Valeton) Razafim. & B.Bremer
- Gynochthodes microcephala (Bartl. ex DC.) Razafim. & B.Bremer
- Gynochthodes mindanaensis Merr.
- Gynochthodes mollis (A.Gray) Razafim. & B.Bremer
- Gynochthodes montana (J.T.Johanss.) Razafim. & B.Bremer
- Gynochthodes motleyi (Hook.f.) Ruhsam
- Gynochthodes myrtifolia (A.Gray) Razafim. & B.Bremer
- Gynochthodes nanlingensis (Y.Z.Ruan) Razafim. & B.Bremer
- Gynochthodes neocaledonica (S.Moore) Razafim. & B.Bremer
- Gynochthodes nigra (Merr.) Merr.
- Gynochthodes nitida (Merr.) Razafim. & B.Bremer
- Gynochthodes oblongifolia (Valeton) Razafim. & B.Bremer
- Gynochthodes officinalis (F.C.How) Razafim. & B.Bremer
- Gynochthodes oligantha Merr.
- Gynochthodes oligocephala (Merr. & L.M.Perry) Razafim. & B.Bremer
- Gynochthodes oresbia Halford & A.J.Ford
- Gynochthodes parvifolia (Bartl. ex DC.) Razafim. & B.Bremer
- Gynochthodes philippinensis (Elmer) Merr.
- Gynochthodes phyllireoides (Labill.) Razafim. & B.Bremer
- Gynochthodes platyphylla (Merr.) Razafim. & B.Bremer
- Gynochthodes podistra (Halford & A.J.Ford) Razafim. & B.Bremer
- Gynochthodes polillensis (C.B.Rob.) Ruhsam
- Gynochthodes polyneura (Miq.) Razafim. & B.Bremer
- Gynochthodes proboscidea Pierre ex Pit.
- Gynochthodes puberula Craib
- Gynochthodes pubifolia Merr.
- Gynochthodes pubiofficinalis (Y.Z.Ruan) Razafim. & B.Bremer
- Gynochthodes retropila (Halford & A.J.Ford) Razafim. & B.Bremer
- Gynochthodes retusa (Poir.) Razafim. & B.Bremer
- Gynochthodes ridleyi (King & Gamble) Razafim. & B.Bremer
- Gynochthodes ridsdalei Razafim. & B.Bremer
- Gynochthodes rigida (Miq.) Razafim. & B.Bremer
- Gynochthodes rugulosa (Y.Z.Ruan) Razafim. & B.Bremer
- Gynochthodes sarmentosa (Blume) Razafim. & B.Bremer
- Gynochthodes scabrifolia (Y.Z.Ruan) Razafim. & B.Bremer
- Gynochthodes sessilis Halford
- Gynochthodes shuanghuaensis (C.Y.Chen & M.S.Huang) Razafim. & B.Bremer
- Gynochthodes subcaudata (Valeton) Razafim. & B.Bremer
- Gynochthodes sublanceolata Miq.
- Gynochthodes suratmanii K.M.Wong & Razafim.
- Gynochthodes triandra (S.Moore) Razafim. & B.Bremer
- Gynochthodes trimera (Hillebr.) Razafim. & B.Bremer
- Gynochthodes truncata (J.T.Johanss.) Razafim. & B.Bremer
- Gynochthodes umbellata (L.) Razafim. & B.Bremer
- Gynochthodes verticillata (Valeton) Hosok.
- Gynochthodes villosa (Hook.f.) Razafim. & B.Bremer
- Gynochthodes wallichii (Kurz) Razafim. & B.Bremer
- Gynochthodes wongii Razafim. & B.Bremer
