= Morinda fasciculata =

Conservation status
- Data Deficient (IUCN 3.1)

Scientific classification
- Kingdom: Plantae
- Clade: Tracheophytes
- Clade: Angiosperms
- Clade: Eudicots
- Clade: Asterids
- Order: Gentianales
- Family: Rubiaceae
- Genus: Morinda
- Species: M. fasciculata

Binomial name
- Morinda fasciculata Benth.

Species of flowering plant

Morinda fasciculata is a species of plant in the family Rubiaceae. It is endemic to Ecuador.
