= Appunia =

Scientific classification
- Kingdom: Plantae
- Clade: Embryophytes
- Clade: Tracheophytes
- Clade: Spermatophytes
- Clade: Angiosperms
- Clade: Eudicots
- Clade: Asterids
- Order: Gentianales
- Family: Rubiaceae
- Subfamily: Rubioideae
- Tribe: Morindeae
- Genus: Appunia; Hook.f.

Type species
- Appunia tenuiflora (Benth.) B.D.Jacks.

Synonyms
- Bellynkxia Müll.Arg.

Genus of plants

Appunia is a genus of flowering plants in the family Rubiaceae. It was described by Joseph Dalton Hooker in 1873. The genus is found from southern Mexico, Central America, and northern South America.

== Species ==
- Appunia aurantiaca (K.Krause) Sandwith - Roraima
- Appunia brachycalyx (Bremek.) Steyerm. - Guyana, Suriname, French Guiana
- Appunia calycina (Benth.) Sandwith - Guyana
- Appunia debilis Sandwith - Guyana
- Appunia guatemalensis Donn. - Guatemala, Belize, Honduras, Nicaragua, Costa Rica, Chiapas, Tabasco, Veracruz
- Appunia longipedunculata (Steyerm.) Delprete - Colombia, Venezuela
- Appunia megalantha C.M.Taylor & Lorence - Colombia, Perú
- Appunia odontocalyx Sandwith - Bolivia
- Appunia peduncularis (Kunth) Delprete - Venezuela, Brazil
- Appunia seibertii Standl. - Panamá, Colombia Ecuador
- Appunia surinamensis (Bremek.) Steyerm. - Suriname
- Appunia tenuiflora (Benth.) B.D.Jacks. - French Guiana, Suriname, Guyana, Venezuela, Bolivia, Colombia, Perú, northern Brazil
- Appunia triphylla Ducke - Brazil
- Appunia venezuelensis Steyerm. - Venezuela
