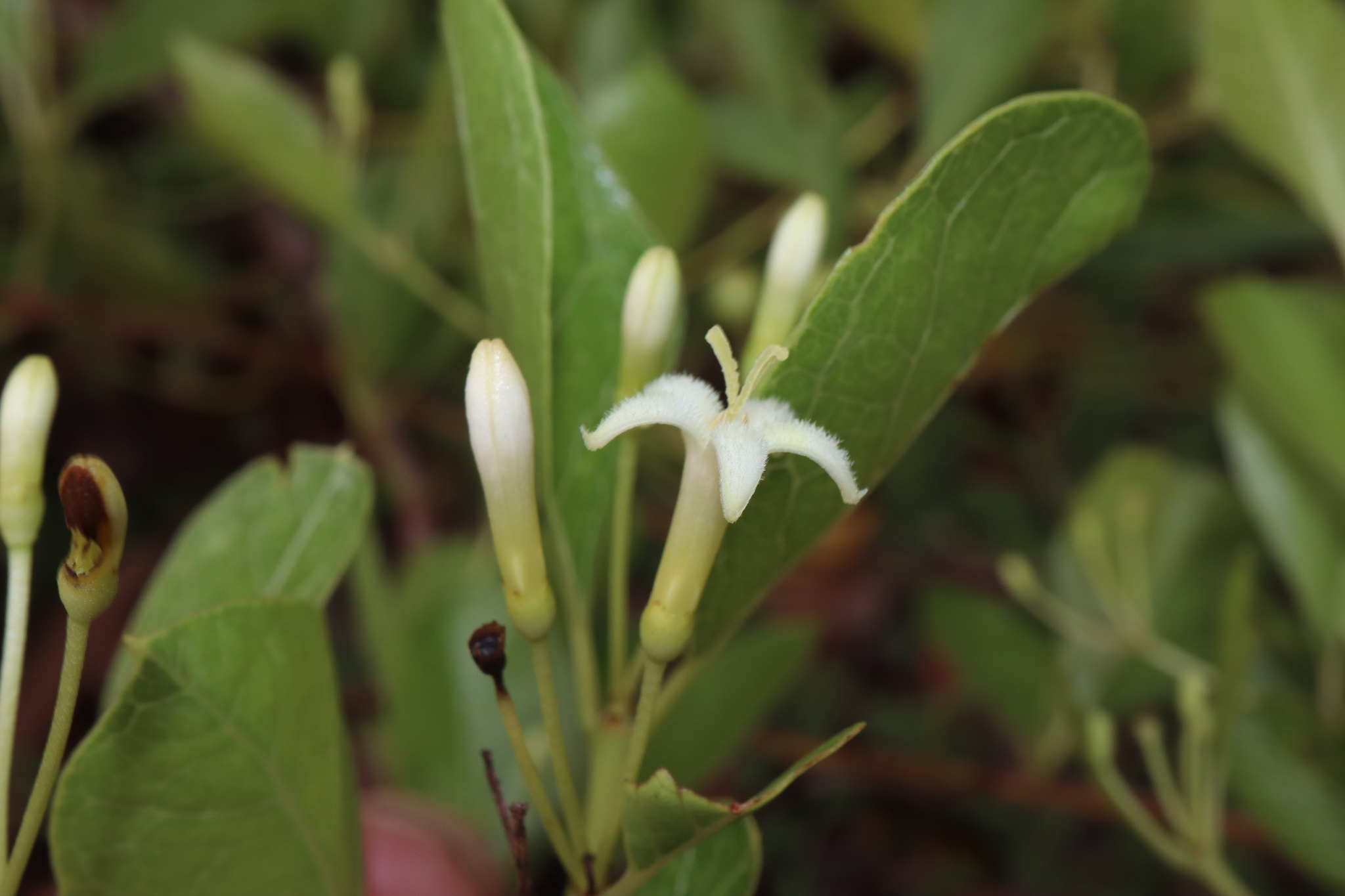
- Coelospermum reticulatum

Scientific classification
- Kingdom: Plantae
- Clade: Embryophytes
- Clade: Tracheophytes
- Clade: Angiosperms
- Clade: Eudicots
- Clade: Asterids
- Order: Gentianales
- Family: Rubiaceae
- Subfamily: Rubioideae
- Tribe: Morindeae
- Genus: Coelospermum; Blume

Synonyms
- Figuierea Montrouz.; Holostyla Endl.; Holostylus Rchb.; Merismostigma S.Moore; Olostyla DC.; Pogonolobus F.Muell.; Trisciadia Hook.f.

= Coelospermum =

Genus of flowering plants

Coelospermum is a genus of flowering plants in the family Rubiaceae. The natural range of the genus is parts of southern China, Malesia, Papuasia, Australia and New Caledonia.

== Species ==
The following is a list of all species in this genus that are accepted by Plants of the World Online as of 26 May 2023

- Coelospermum balansanum Baill.
- Coelospermum crassifolium J.T.Johanss.
- Coelospermum dasylobum Halford & A.J.Ford
- Coelospermum decipiens Baill.
- Coelospermum fragrans (Montrouz.) Baill. ex Guillaumin
- Coelospermum nomac Mouly & Fleurot
- Coelospermum paniculatum F.Muell.
- Coelospermum purpureum Halford & A.J.Ford
- Coelospermum reticulatum (F.Muell.) Benth.
- Coelospermum salomoniense (Engl.) J.T.Johanss.
- Coelospermum truncatum (Wall.) Baill. ex K.Schum.
- Coelospermum volubile (Merr.) J.T.Johanss.
