= Morinda asteroscepa =

Conservation status
- Vulnerable (IUCN 3.1)

Scientific classification
- Kingdom: Plantae
- Clade: Tracheophytes
- Clade: Angiosperms
- Clade: Eudicots
- Clade: Asterids
- Order: Gentianales
- Family: Rubiaceae
- Genus: Morinda
- Species: M. asteroscepa

Binomial name
- Morinda asteroscepa K.Schum.

Species of flowering plant

Morinda asteroscepa is a species of plant in the family Rubiaceae. It is found in Malawi and Tanzania, and is on the IUCN Red List vulnerable species (Plantae).
