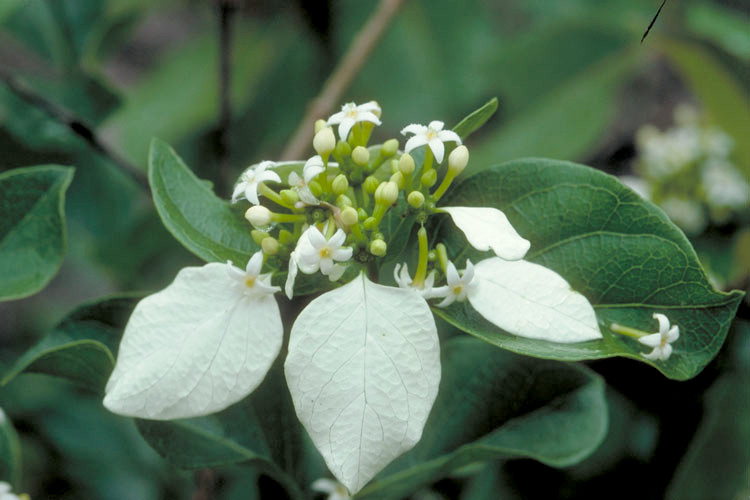
- Inflorescence

Conservation status
- Least Concern (NCA)

Scientific classification
- Kingdom: Plantae
- Clade: Tracheophytes
- Clade: Angiosperms
- Clade: Eudicots
- Clade: Asterids
- Order: Gentianales
- Family: Rubiaceae
- Genus: Coelospermum
- Species: C. decipiens

Binomial name
- Coelospermum decipiens Baill.

Synonyms
- Morinda reticulata Benth.

= Coelospermum decipiens =

Species of plant in the gardenia family

Coelospermum decipiens is a species of flowering plant in the family Rubiaceae. It is endemic to Queensland, Australia. This species is a liana found in tropical evergreen forests.

== Uses ==
The roots were traditionally used by the Aboriginal people of Cape York either as a source of yellow dye or as a natural contraceptive.
