= Gynochthodes officinalis =

Scientific classification
- Kingdom: Plantae
- Clade: Tracheophytes
- Clade: Angiosperms
- Clade: Eudicots
- Clade: Asterids
- Order: Gentianales
- Family: Rubiaceae
- Genus: Gynochthodes
- Species: G. officinalis

Binomial name
- Gynochthodes officinalis (F.C.How) Razafim. & B.Bremer

Synonyms
- Morinda officinalis (Hillebr.)

Species of flowering plant

Gynochthodes officinalis, synonym Morinda officinalis and also known as Indian mulberry, is a plant in the coffee family Rubiaceae.

== Medicinal uses ==
The root of G. officinalis (Chinese: 巴戟天; pinyin: ba ji tian) is used in traditional Chinese medicine (TCM). It was first described in Shen Nong Ben Cao Jing. In TCM it is indicated in the case of kidney yang deficiency and associated impotence, weak tendons and bones, presence of wind and dampness.

Known compounds include morindin.

== Various nominal ==
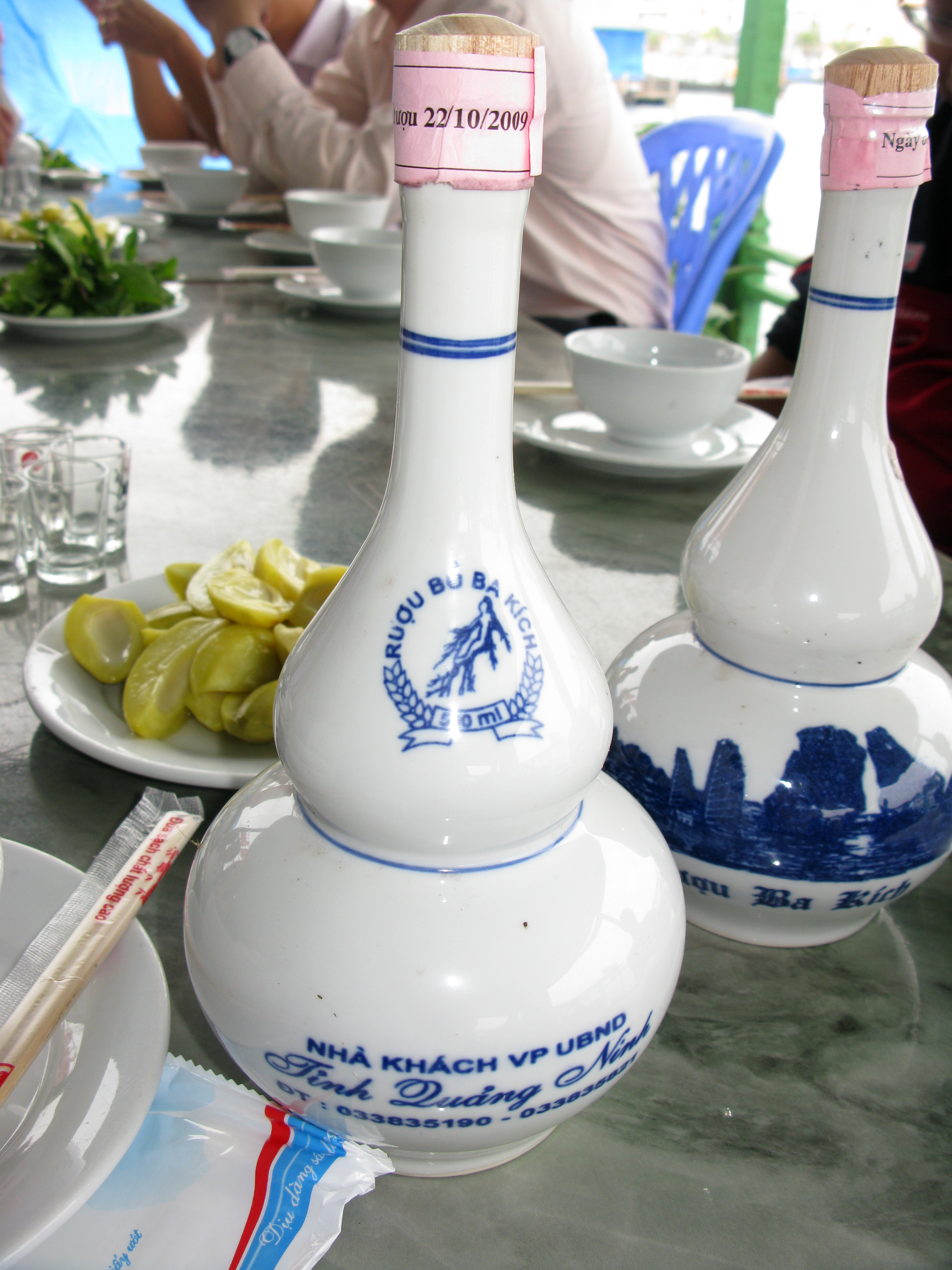
Ba kich liquor - well-known product of Quang Ninh Province, Vietnam.

It is known as ba kich in Vietnamese.
