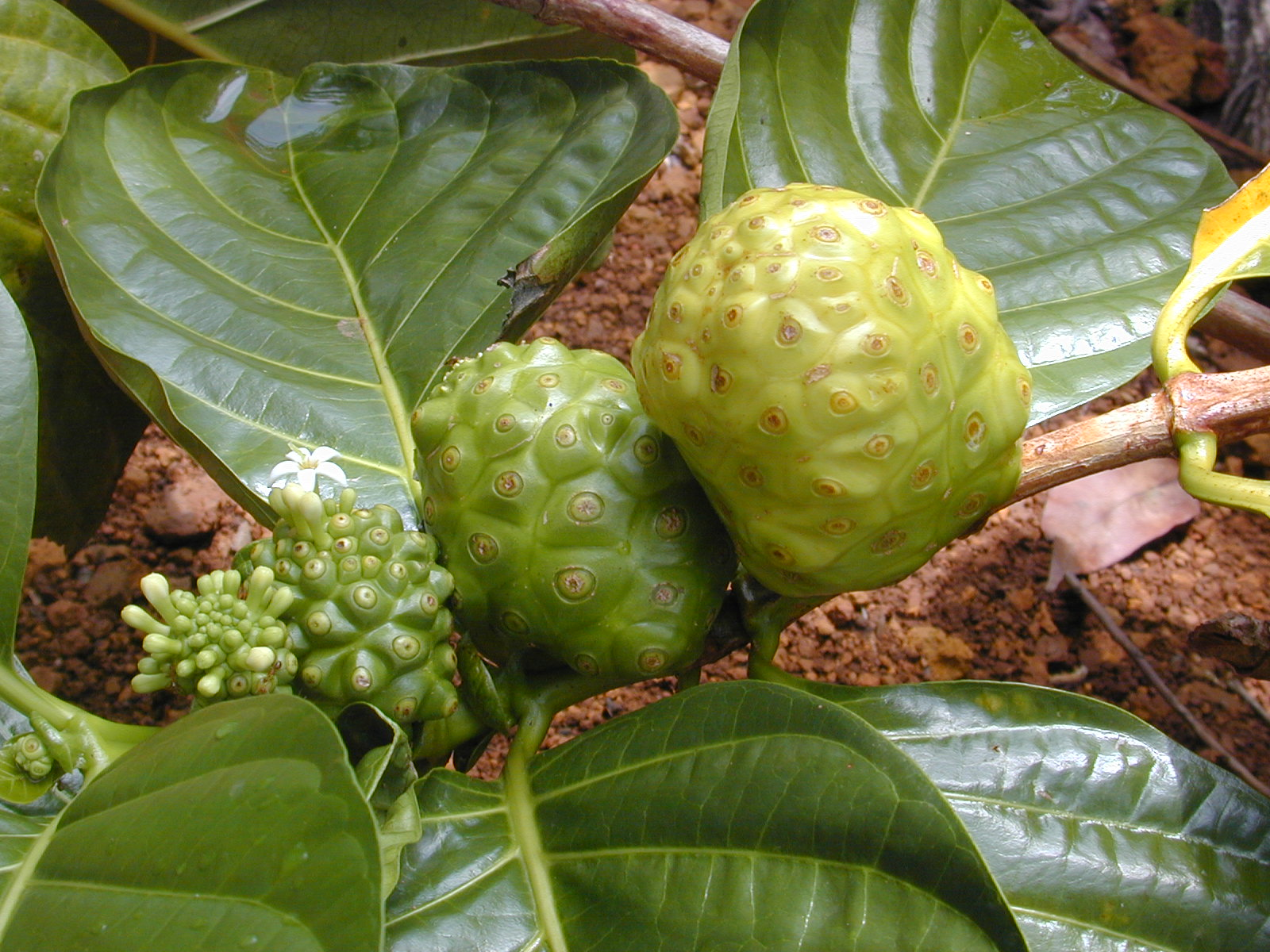
- Morinda citrifolia

Scientific classification
- Kingdom: Plantae
- Clade: Tracheophytes
- Clade: Angiosperms
- Clade: Eudicots
- Clade: Asterids
- Order: Gentianales
- Family: Rubiaceae
- Subfamily: Rubioideae
- Tribe: Morindeae; Miq.

Type genus
- Morinda L.

= Morindeae =

Tribe of flowering plants

Morindeae is a tribe of flowering plants in the family Rubiaceae. The tribe contains about 165 species in 5 genera, found mainly in the tropics and subtropics.

== Genera ==
Currently accepted names

- Appunia Hook.f. (14 sp)
- Coelospermum Blume (11 sp)
- Gynochthodes Blume (97 sp)
- Morinda L. (39 sp)
- Siphonandrium K.Schum. (1 sp)

Synonyms

- Appunettia R.D.Good = Morinda
- Belicea Lundell = Morinda
- Bellynkxia Müll.Arg. = Appunia
- Figuierea Montrouz. = Coelospermum
- Guttenbergia Zoll. & Moritzi = Gynochthodes
- Holostyla Endl. = Coelospermum
- Holostylis Rchb. = Coelospermum
- Imantina Hook.f. = Gynochthodes
- Merismostigma S.Moore = Coelospermum
- Olostyla DC. = Coelospermum
- Pogonanthus Montrouz. = Gynochthodes
- Pogonolobus F.Muell. = Coelospermum
- Rojoc Adans. = Morinda
- Sarcopygme Setch. & Christoph. = Morinda
- Sphaerophora Blume = Gynochthodes
- Stigmanthus Lour. = Gynochthodes
- Tetralopha Hook.f. = Gynochthodes
- Trisciadia Hook.f. = Coelospermum
