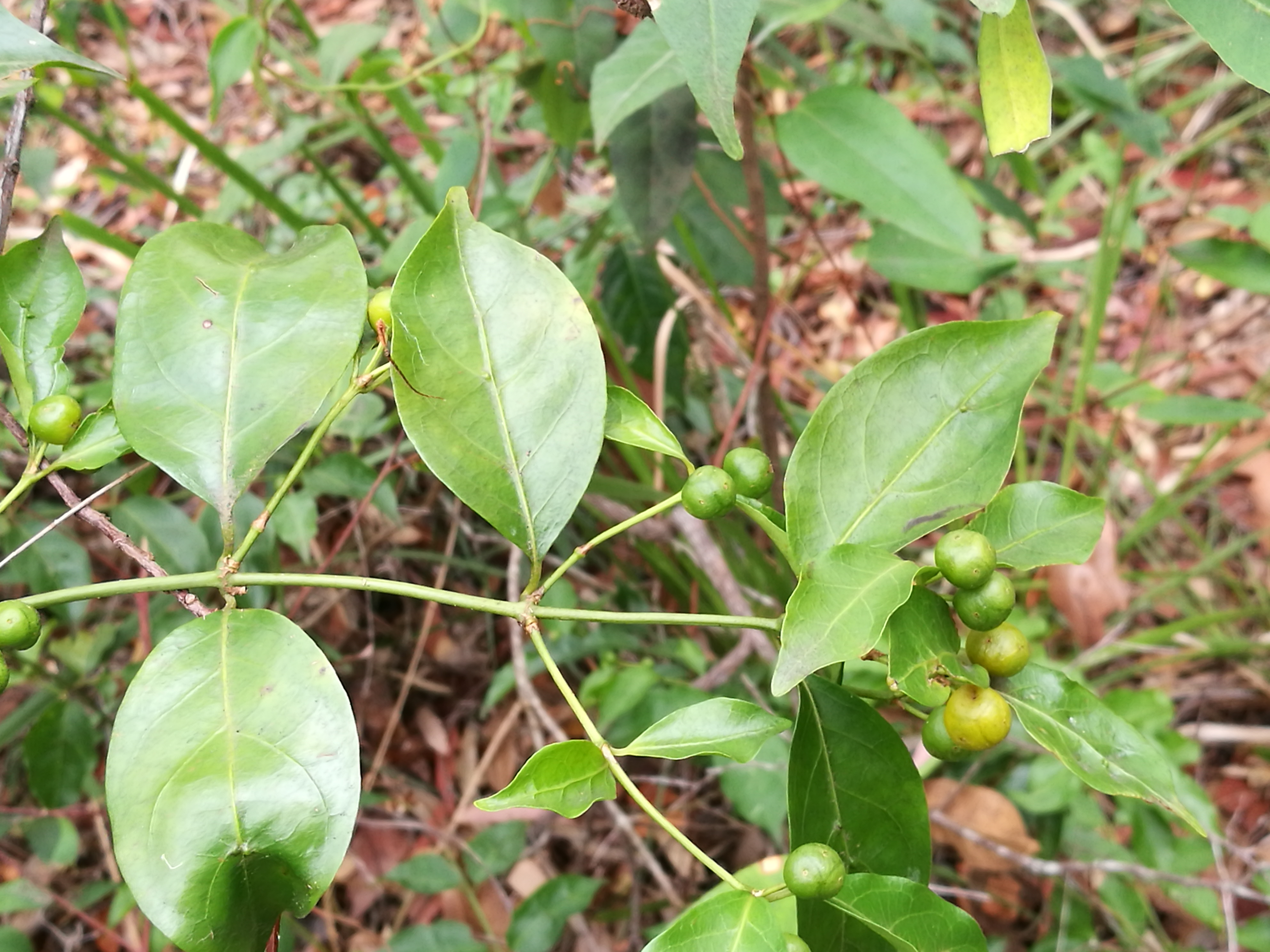
- Gynochthodes jasminoides
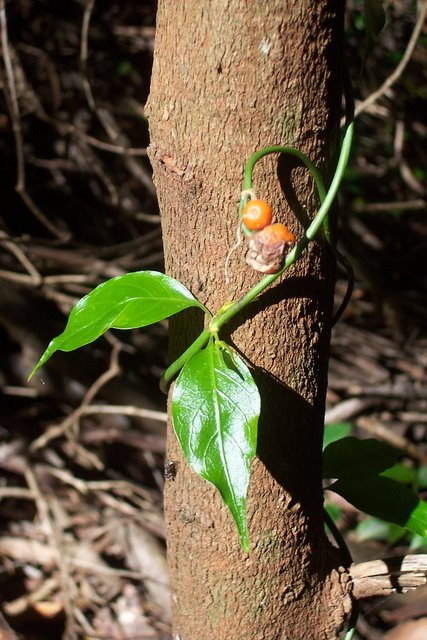
- Gynochthodes jasminoides on a common lilli pilli at Chatswood West, Australia

Scientific classification
- Kingdom: Plantae
- Clade: Tracheophytes
- Clade: Angiosperms
- Clade: Eudicots
- Clade: Asterids
- Order: Gentianales
- Family: Rubiaceae
- Genus: Gynochthodes
- Species: G. jasminoides

Binomial name
- Gynochthodes jasminoides (A.Cunn.) Razafim. & B.Bremer

Synonyms
- Morinda jasminoides A.Cunn.

= Gynochthodes jasminoides =

Species of flowering plant

Gynochthodes jasminoides is a woody climber or a scrambling shrub in the family Rubiaceae. In Australia it is found on the northern and eastern coasts, in Western Australia, the Northern Territory, Queensland, Victoria, and New South Wales.

== Taxonomy ==
Gynochthodes jasminoides was first described by Allan Cunningham in 1834 as Morinda jasminoides. In 2011, based on new molecular studies, the genera Morinda and Gynochthodes were redescribed, which necessitated new combinations and names in these genera. This resulted in Morinda jasminoides being assigned to the genus Gynochthodes by Sylvain Razafimandimbison and Birgitta Bremer.

== Description ==
It is a woody climber or scrambler, with opposite leaves. The flowers are usually terminal and occur in 3–20-flowered heads. The corolla is white to purplish and the flowers have an orange syncarp.

It is found growing in moist rainforest and vine-thickets, often in gullies.
