= Gynochthodes trimera =

Noni kuahiwi

Conservation status
- Near Threatened (IUCN 2.3)

Scientific classification
- Kingdom: Plantae
- Clade: Tracheophytes
- Clade: Angiosperms
- Clade: Eudicots
- Clade: Asterids
- Order: Gentianales
- Family: Rubiaceae
- Genus: Gynochthodes
- Species: G. trimera

Binomial name
- Gynochthodes trimera Hillebr.) Razafim. & B.Bremer

Synonyms
- Morinda trimera (Hillebr.)

Species of tree

Gynochthodes trimera, synonym Morinda trimera and known as noni kuahiwi is a species of flowering tree in the coffee family, Rubiaceae, that is endemic to Hawaiʻi.
