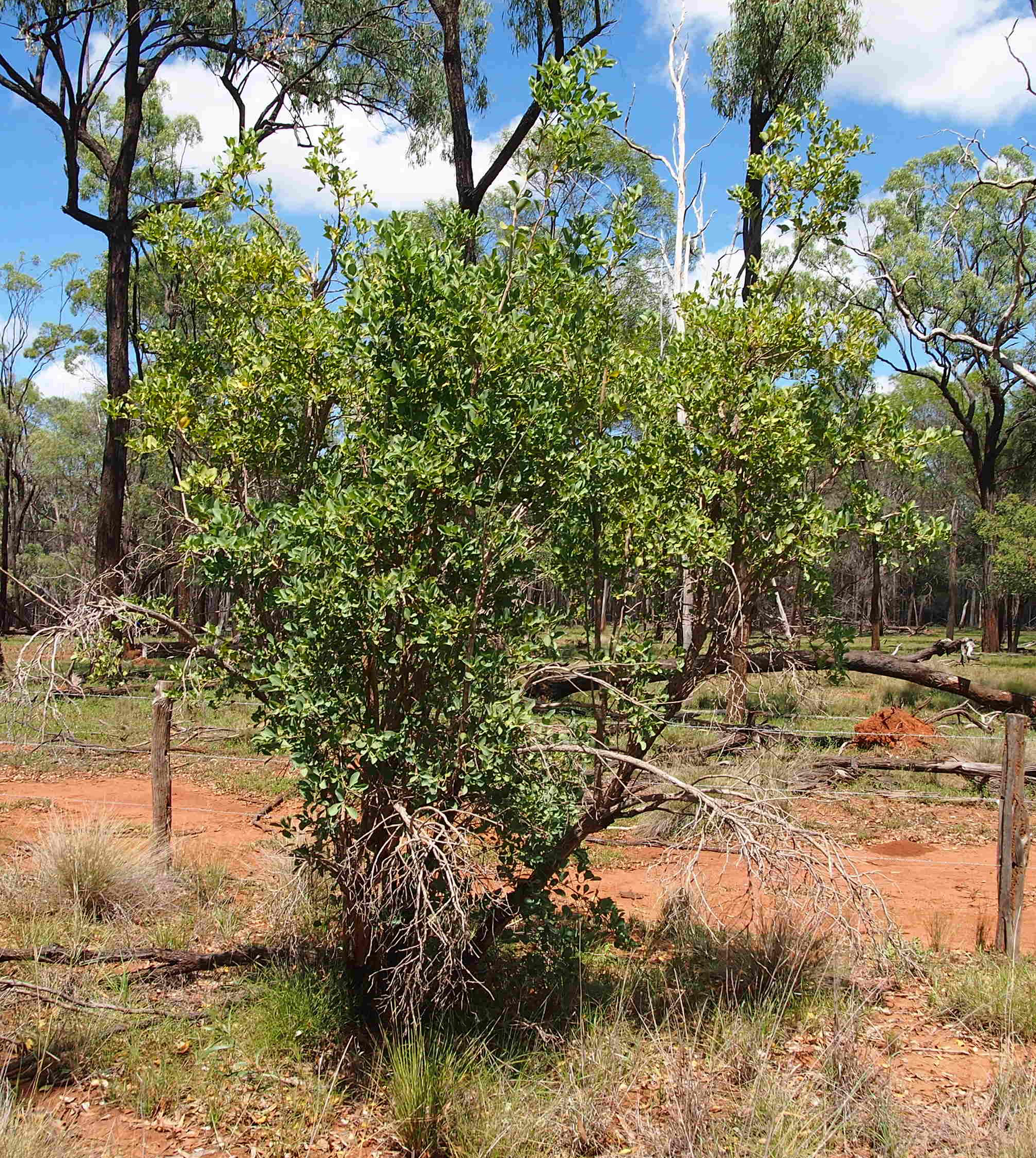

Conservation status
- Least Concern (NCA)

Scientific classification
- Kingdom: Plantae
- Clade: Tracheophytes
- Clade: Angiosperms
- Clade: Eudicots
- Clade: Asterids
- Order: Gentianales
- Family: Rubiaceae
- Genus: Coelospermum
- Species: C. reticulatum

Binomial name
- Coelospermum reticulatum (F.Muell.) Benth.

Synonyms
- Pogonolobus reticulatus F.Muell.

= Coelospermum reticulatum =

Species of flowering plant

Coelospermum reticulatum, commonly known as medicine bush, is a species of flowering plant in the family Rubiaceae native to New Guinea, the Northern Territory, and Queensland. Its natural habitat is dry rainforest and wetter Eucalyptus woodland. It was originally described as Pogonolobus reticulatus in 1858, before being transferred to its current name in 1867. The plant is an important source of dye for Aboriginal people.

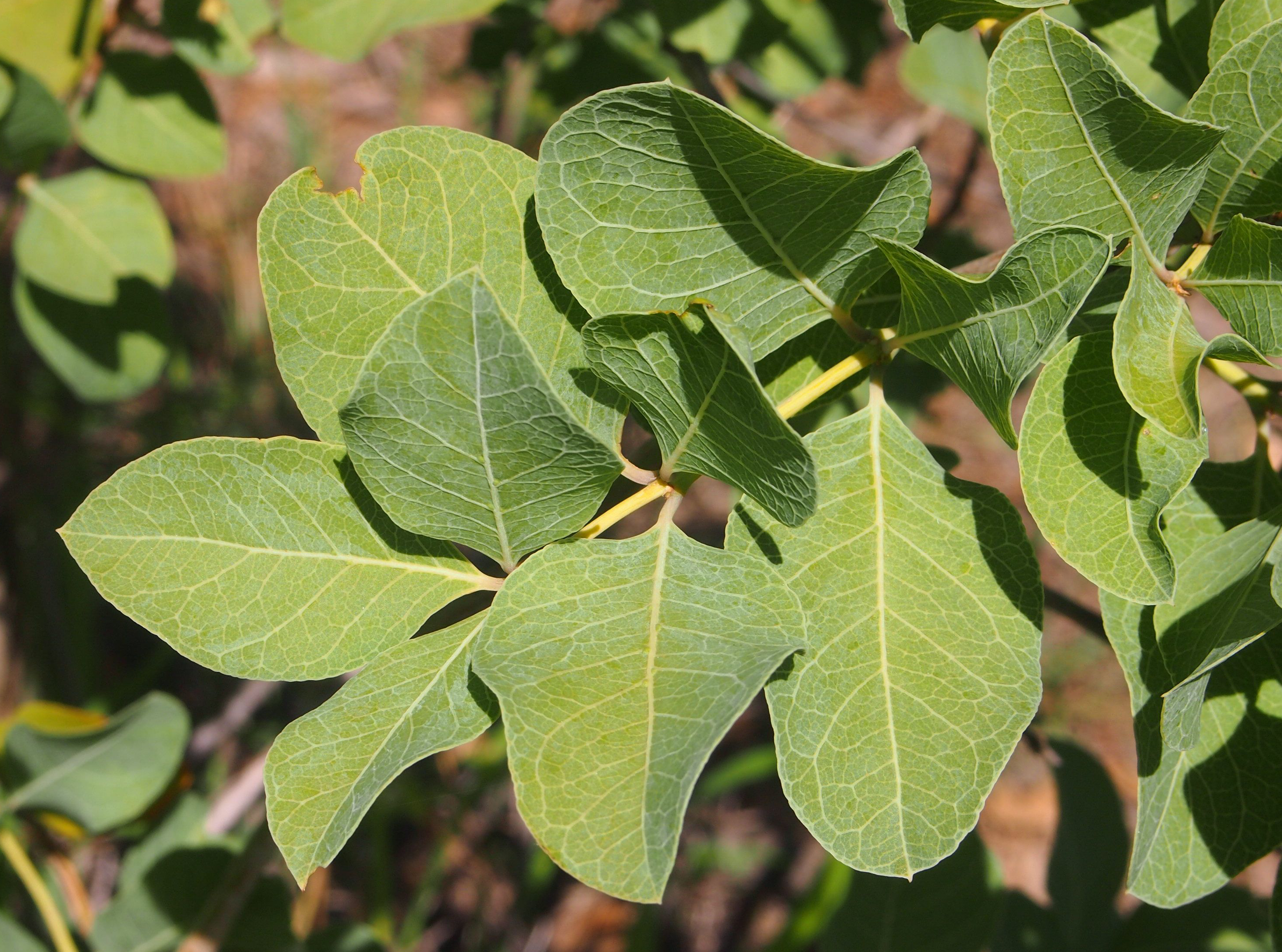
Foliage

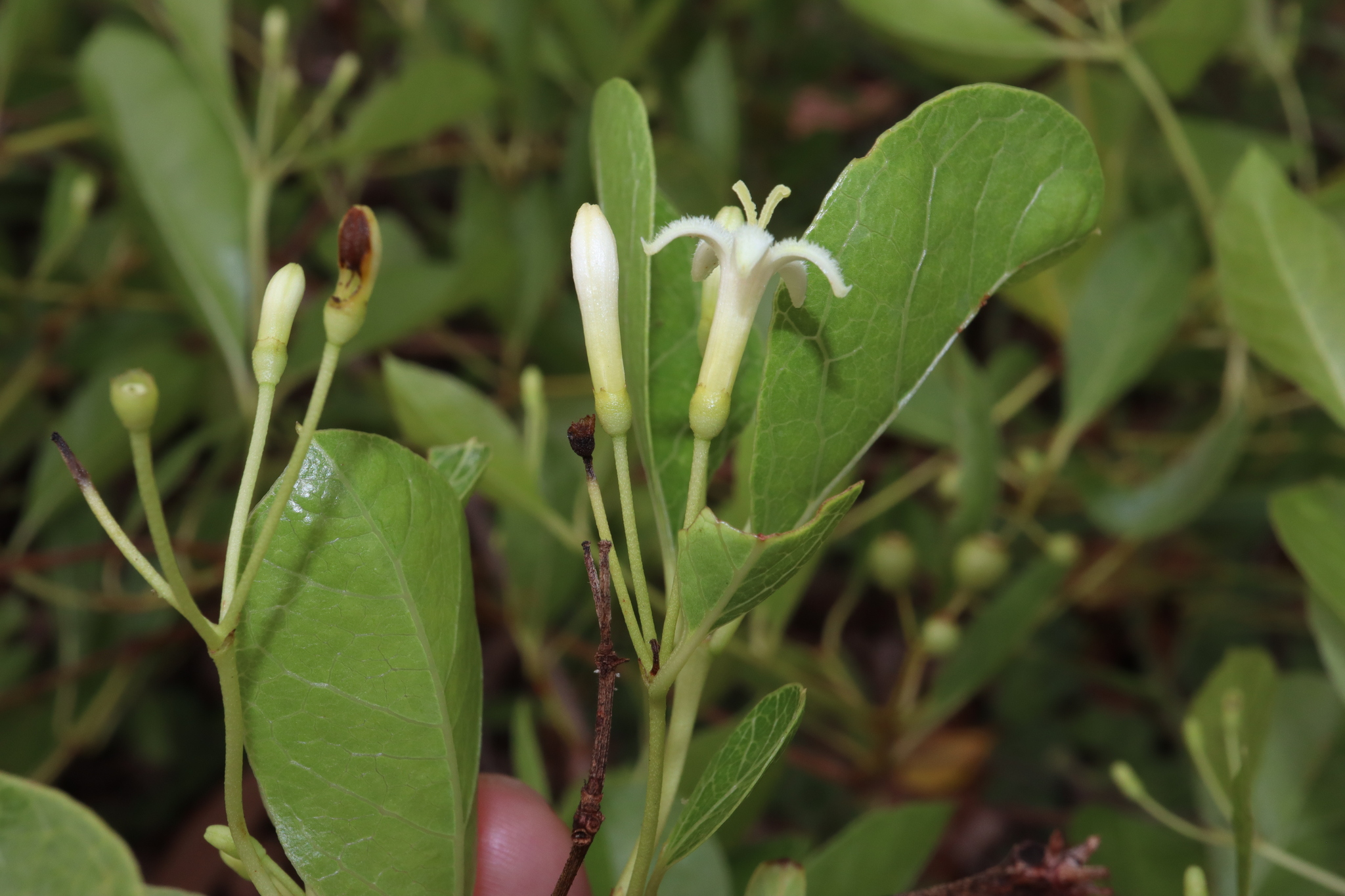
Flowers

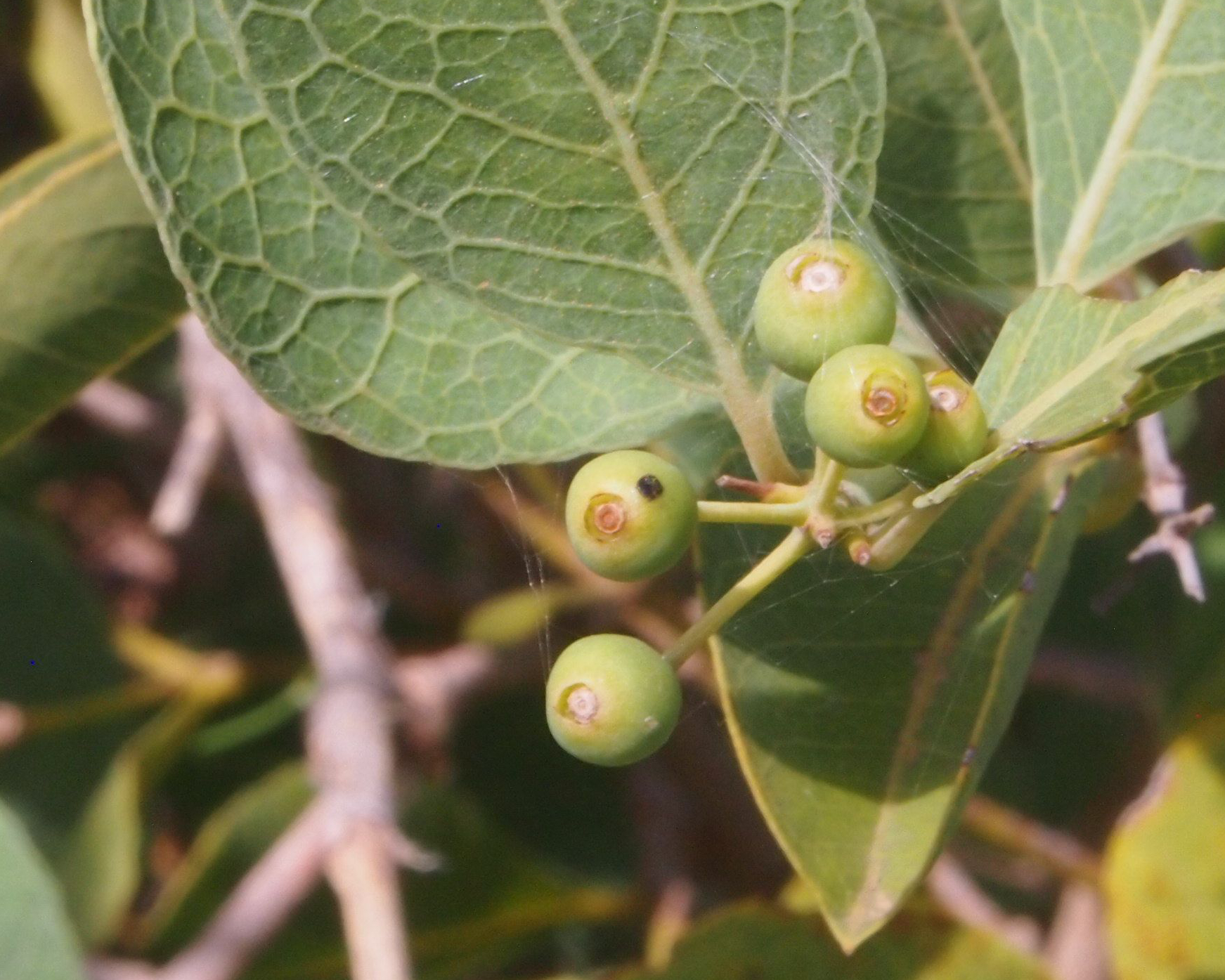
Fruit

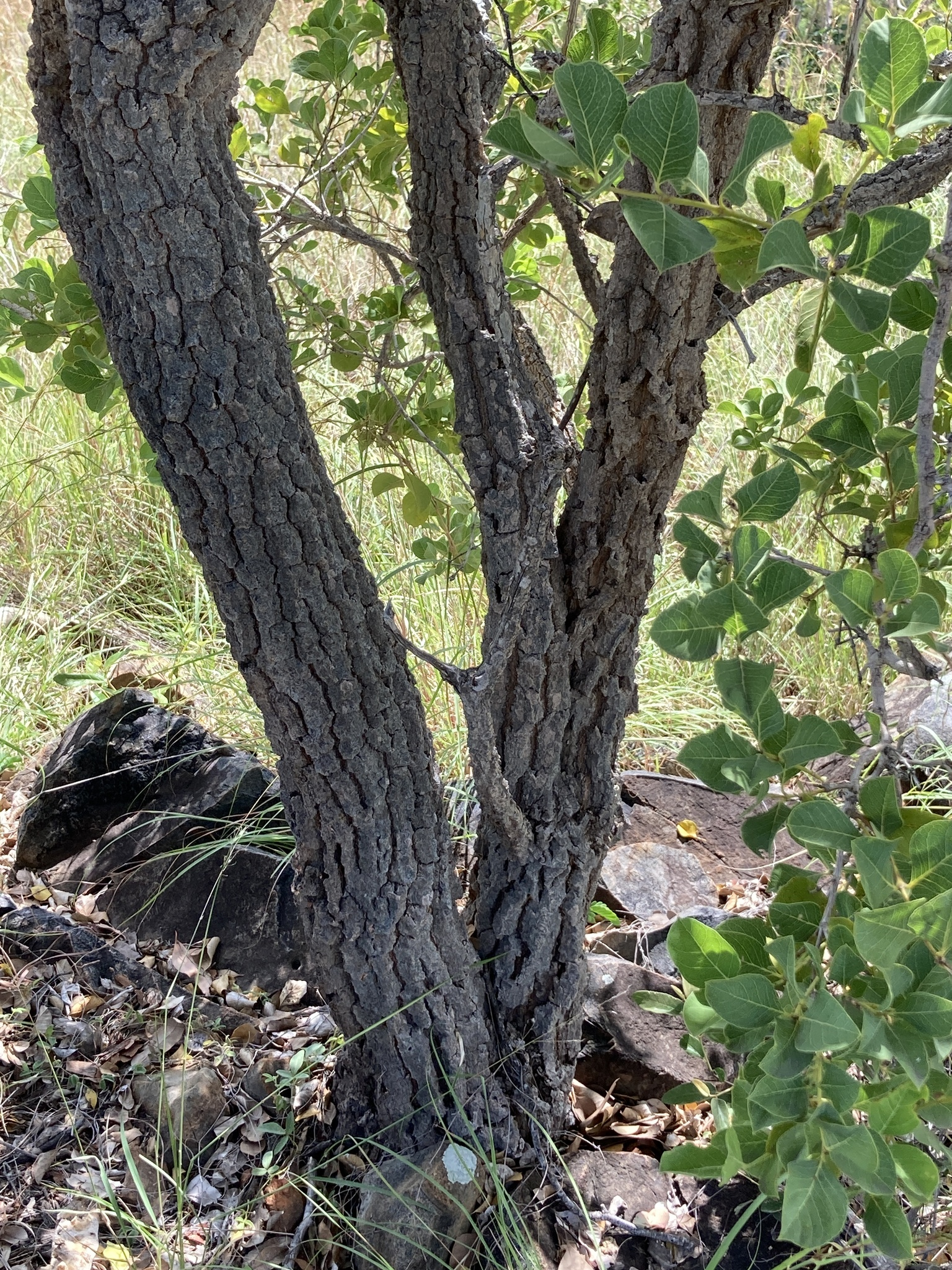
Trunk & bark
