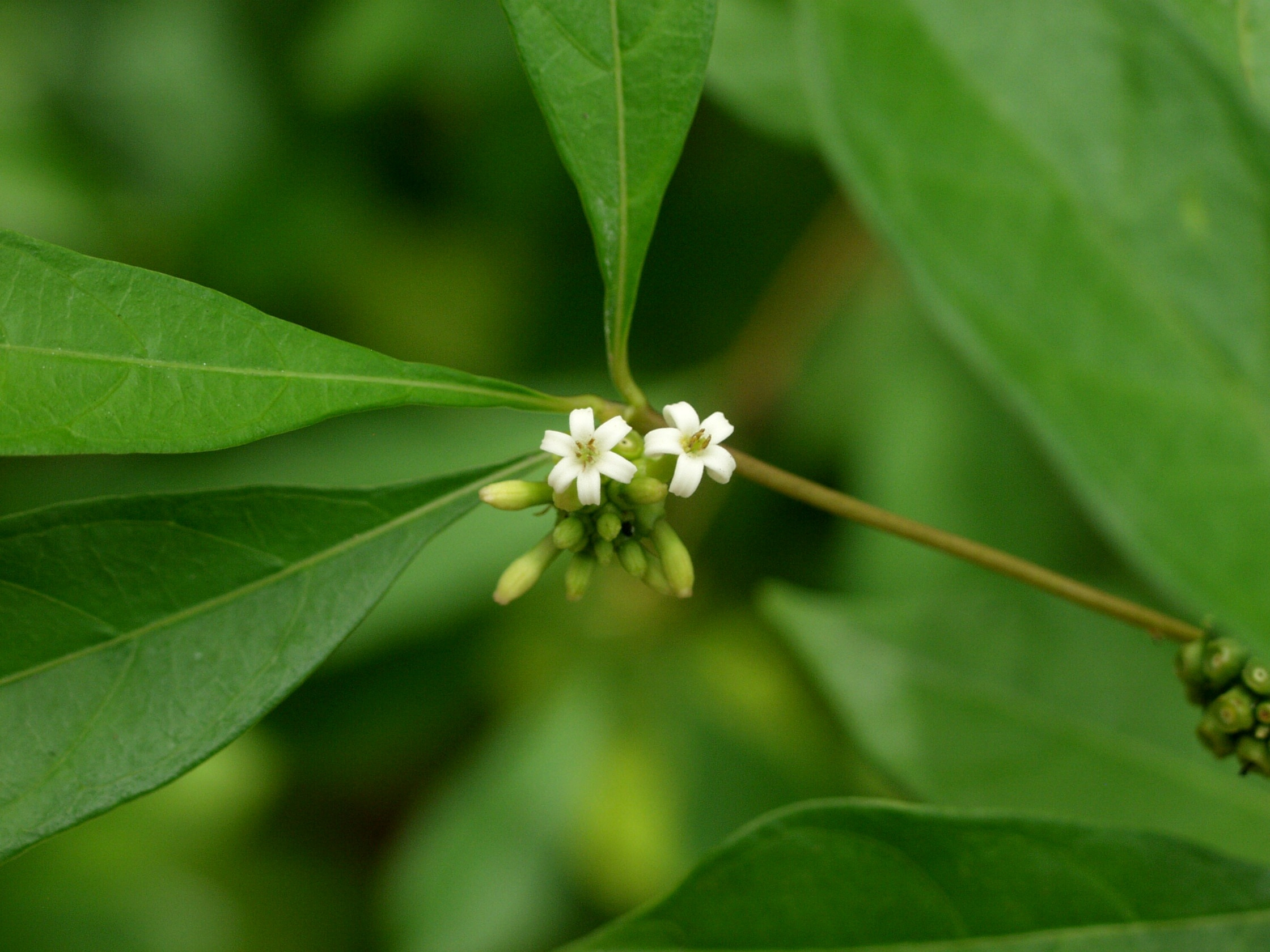

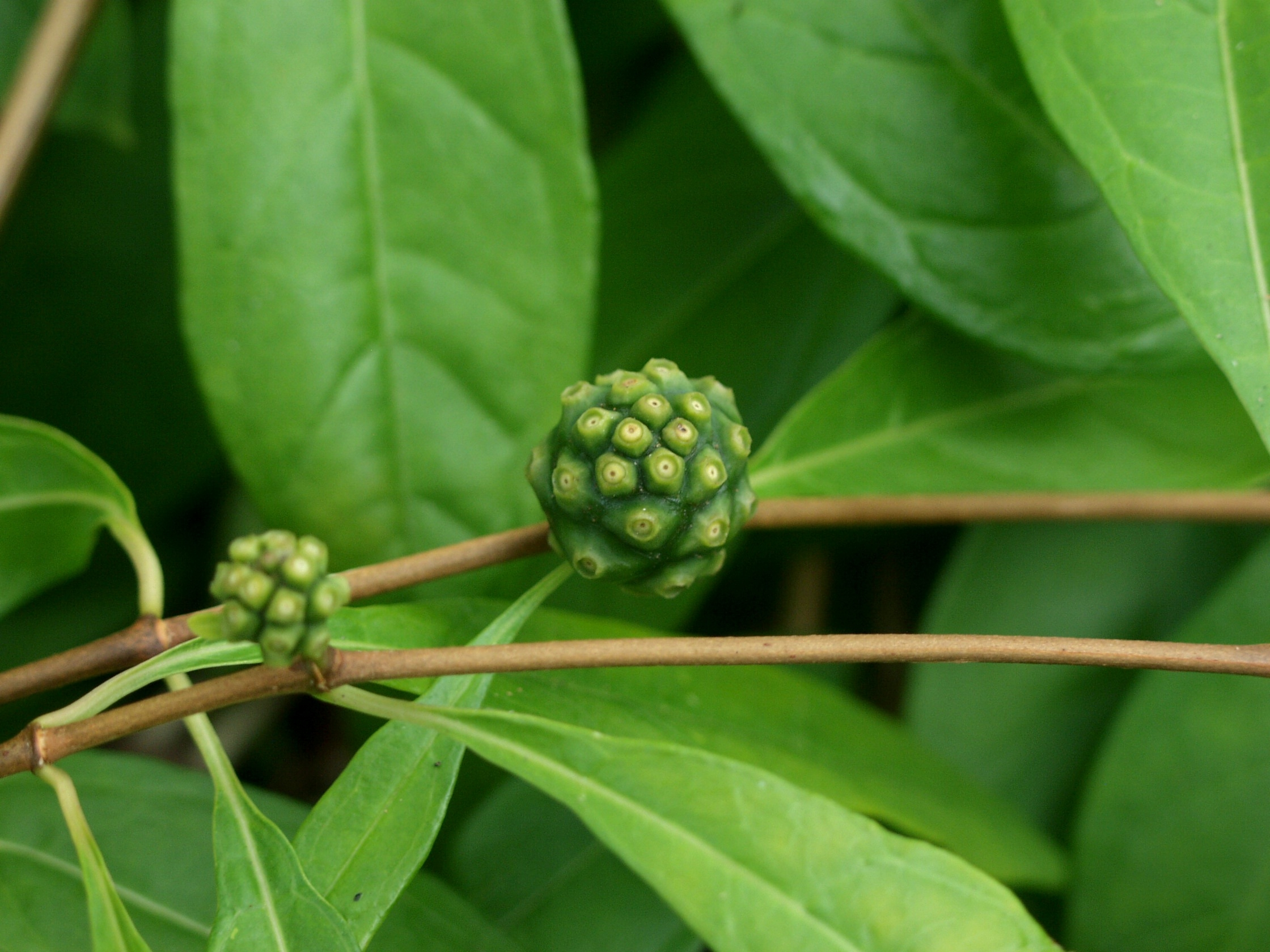

Scientific classification
- Kingdom: Plantae
- Clade: Tracheophytes
- Clade: Angiosperms
- Clade: Eudicots
- Clade: Asterids
- Order: Gentianales
- Family: Rubiaceae
- Genus: Morinda
- Species: M. royoc

Binomial name
- Morinda royoc L.

Synonyms
- Morinda ferruginea A.Rich. Morinda yucatanensis Greenm.

= Morinda royoc =

Yawweed

Species of shrub

Morinda royoc, commonly known as redgal, yawweed or cheese shrub, is a species of flowering plant in the coffee family. It is native to Central America, South America, southern Florida, and the islands of the Caribbean. It is a vine or sprawling shrub found in sandy or rocky coastal areas.

It produces small white flowers throughout the year.
