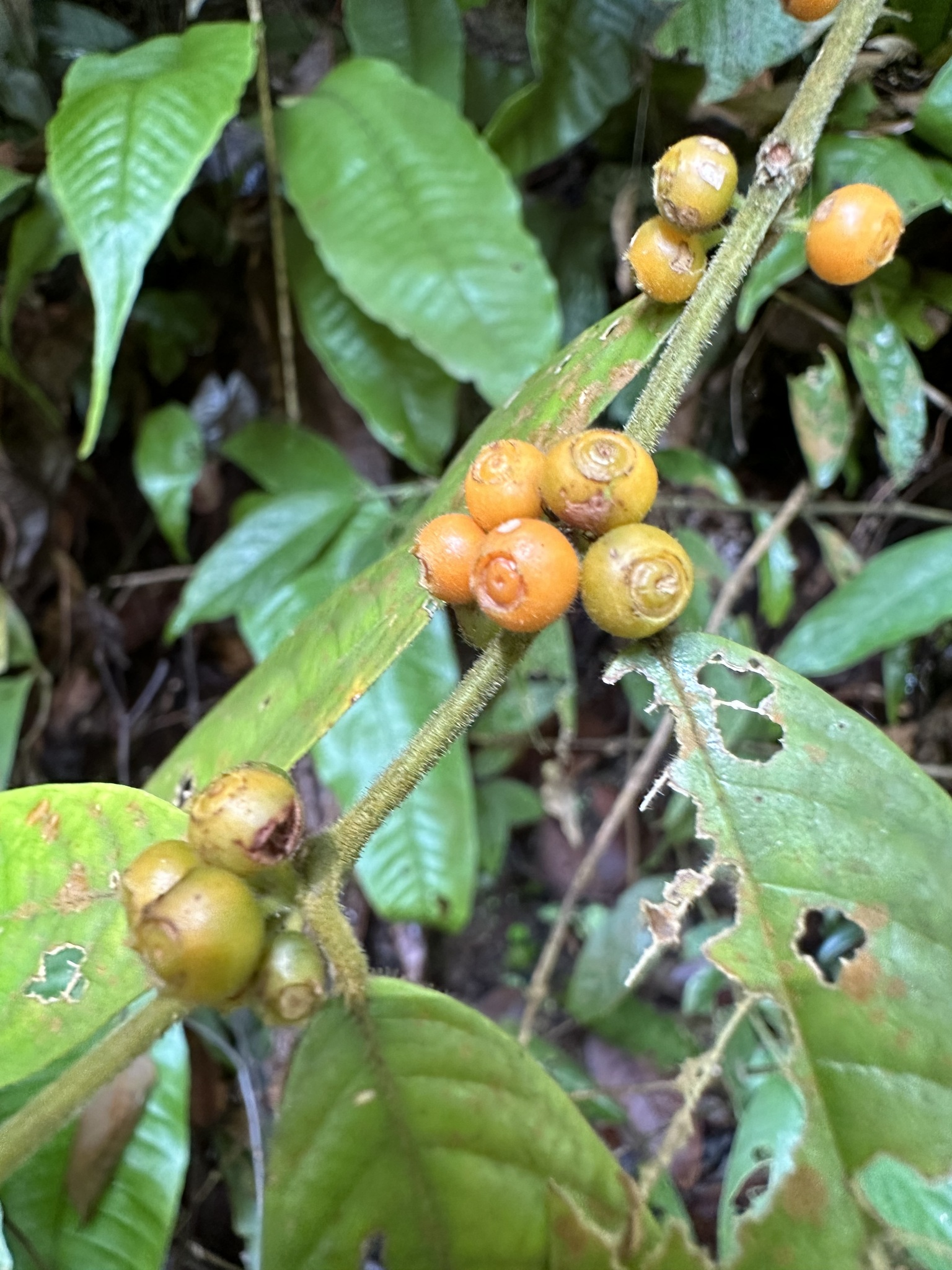
- Urophyllum hirsutum in Singapore

Scientific classification
- Kingdom: Plantae
- Clade: Tracheophytes
- Clade: Angiosperms
- Clade: Eudicots
- Clade: Asterids
- Order: Gentianales
- Family: Rubiaceae
- Subfamily: Rubioideae
- Tribe: Urophylleae; Bremek. ex Verdc.

= Urophylleae =

Tribe of plants

Urophylleae is a tribe of flowering plants in the family Rubiaceae and contains 237 species in 6 genera. Its representatives are found in the tropics.

== Genera ==
Currently accepted names

- Amphidasya Standl. (13 sp) - Central and Southern Tropical America
- Antherostele Bremek. (5 sp) - Philippines
- Pauridiantha Hook.f. (50 sp) - Tropical Africa and Madagascar
- Praravinia Korth. (49 sp) - Malesia
- Raritebe Wernham (1 sp) - Central America to Peru
- Rhaphidura Bremek. (1 sp.) – Borneo
- Urophyllum Jack ex Wall. (119 sp) - Southern China to Tropical Asia

Synonyms

- Aulacodiscus Hook.f. = Urophyllum
- Axanthes Blume = Urophyllum
- Axanthopsis Korth. = Urophyllum
- Commitheca Bremek. = Pauridiantha
- Cymelonema C.Pres. = Urophyllum
- Dukea Dwyer = Raritebe
- Maschalanthe Blume = Urophyllum
- Maschalocorymbus Bremek. = Urophyllum
- Pamplethantha Bremek. = Pauridiantha
- Paravinia Hassk. = Praravinia
- Pittierothamnus Steyerm. = Amphidasya
- Pleiocarpidia K.Schum. = Urophyllum
- Poecilocalyx Bremek. = Pauridiantha
- Pravinaria Bremek. = Urophyllum
- Stelechantha Bremek. = Pauridiantha
- Wallichia Reinw. ex Blume = Urophyllum
- Williamsia Merr. = Praravinia
