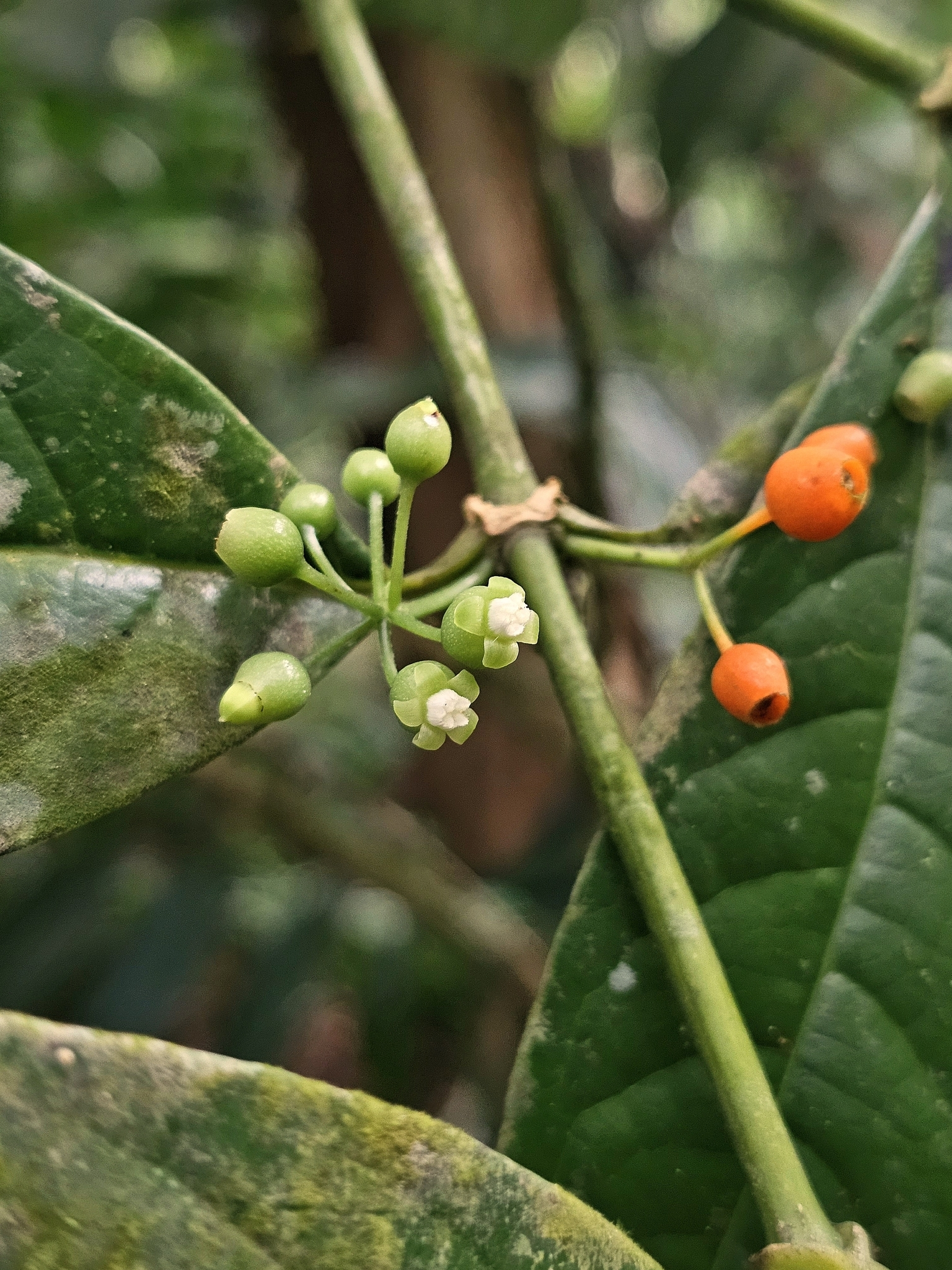
- Urophyllum griffithianum in Singapore

Scientific classification
- Kingdom: Plantae
- Clade: Tracheophytes
- Clade: Angiosperms
- Clade: Eudicots
- Clade: Asterids
- Order: Gentianales
- Family: Rubiaceae
- Tribe: Urophylleae
- Genus: Urophyllum; Wall.

Species
- See text.

Synonyms
- Aulacodiscus Hook.f., nom. illeg.; Axanthes Blume; Axanthopsis Korth.; Cymelonema C.Presl; Maschalanthe Blume; Maschalocorymbus Bremek.; Pleiocarpidia K.Schum.; Pravinaria Bremek.; Wallichia Reinw. ex Blume, nom. illeg.

= Urophyllum =

Genus of plants

Urophyllum is a genus of flowering plant in the family Rubiaceae, native to from south China to Tropical Asia. The genus was established by Nathaniel Wallich in 1824.

== Species ==
As of January 2023, Plants of the World Online accepted the following species:

- Urophyllum acuminatissimum Merr.
- Urophyllum aequale Craib
- Urophyllum andamanicum King & Gamble
- Urophyllum angustifolium Valeton
- Urophyllum arboreum (Reinw. ex Blume) Korth.
- Urophyllum argenteum Pit.
- Urophyllum assahanicum (Bremek.) Smedmark & B.Bremer
- Urophyllum attenuatum Valeton
- Urophyllum bataanense Elmer
- Urophyllum bismarckii-montis Valeton
- Urophyllum borneense Miq.
- Urophyllum bracteolatum Ridl.
- Urophyllum britannicum Wernham
- Urophyllum bullatum Ridl.
- Urophyllum calycinum Valeton
- Urophyllum capitatum Valeton
- Urophyllum capituliflorum Valeton
- Urophyllum capituligerum Ridl.
- Urophyllum castaneum Ridl.
- Urophyllum caudatum Merr.
- Urophyllum cephalotes Ridl.
- Urophyllum ceylanicum (Wight) Thwaites
- Urophyllum chinense Merr. & Chun
- Urophyllum chlamydanthum (Bremek.) Smedmark & B.Bremer
- Urophyllum clemensiorum Smedmark & B.Bremer
- Urophyllum coffeoides (Bremek.) Smedmark & B.Bremer
- Urophyllum congestiflorum Ridl.
- Urophyllum corniculatum (Bremek.) Smedmark & B.Bremer
- Urophyllum corymbosum (Blume) Korth.
- Urophyllum crassum Craib
- Urophyllum curtisii King ex M.R.Hend.
- Urophyllum cyphandrum Stapf
- Urophyllum deliense (Bremek.) Smedmark & B.Bremer
- Urophyllum ellipticum (Wight) Thwaites
- Urophyllum elliptifolium Merr.
- Urophyllum elmeri (Bremek.) Smedmark & B.Bremer
- Urophyllum elongatum (Korth.) Miq.
- Urophyllum endertii (Bremek.) Smedmark & B.Bremer
- Urophyllum enneandrum (Wight) Ridl.
- Urophyllum ferrugineum King & Gamble
- Urophyllum fuscum Craib
- Urophyllum glabrum Jack ex Wall.
- Urophyllum glaucescens Valeton
- Urophyllum glomeratum Valeton
- Urophyllum grandiflorum Valeton
- Urophyllum grandifolium Ridl.
- Urophyllum griffithianum (Wight) Hook.f.
- Urophyllum heteromerum K.Schum.
- Urophyllum hexandrum Kuntze
- Urophyllum hirsutum (Wight) Hook.f.
- Urophyllum holectomium (Bremek.) Smedmark & B.Bremer
- Urophyllum johannis-winkleri Merr.
- Urophyllum kinabaluense (Bremek.) Smedmark & B.Bremer
- Urophyllum korthalsii Miq.
- Urophyllum lanaense (Merr.) Smedmark & B.Bremer
- Urophyllum lasiocarpum Ridl.
- Urophyllum lecomtei Pit.
- Urophyllum leucocarpum (Bremek.) Smedmark & B.Bremer
- Urophyllum leucophlaeum Ridl.
- Urophyllum leytense Merr.
- Urophyllum lineatum Stapf
- Urophyllum longidens Stapf
- Urophyllum longifolium (Wight) Hook.f.
- Urophyllum longipes Craib
- Urophyllum longipetalum Ridl.
- Urophyllum macrophyllum (Blume) Korth.
- Urophyllum macrurum (Bremek.) Smedmark & B.Bremer
- Urophyllum magnifolium (Bremek.) Smedmark & B.Bremer
- Urophyllum maingayi (King & Gamble) Smedmark & B.Bremer
- Urophyllum malayense K.M.Wong
- Urophyllum melanocarpum Ridl.
- Urophyllum memecyloides (C.Presl) S.Vidal
- Urophyllum micranthum Miq.
- Urophyllum mindorense Merr.
- Urophyllum minutiflorum Merr.
- Urophyllum moluccanum Miq.
- Urophyllum motleyi Ridl.
- Urophyllum neriifolium Ridl.
- Urophyllum nigricans Wernham
- Urophyllum oblongum Craib
- Urophyllum oligophlebium Merr.
- Urophyllum olivaceum Craib
- Urophyllum opacum (Bremek.) Smedmark & B.Bremer
- Urophyllum oresitrophum (Bremek.) Koizumi & Nagam.
- Urophyllum pallidum Merr.
- Urophyllum panayense Merr.
- Urophyllum paniculatum Ridl.
- Urophyllum parviflorum F.C.How ex H.S.Lo
- Urophyllum parvistipulum (Bremek.) Smedmark & B.Bremer
- Urophyllum peltistigma Miq.
- Urophyllum pilosum Ridl.
- Urophyllum platyphyllum Elmer
- Urophyllum polyneurum Miq.
- Urophyllum porphyraceum (Mart. ex Rosenthal) Baill.
- Urophyllum pubescens Valeton
- Urophyllum rahmatii Merr.
- Urophyllum reticulatum Elmer
- Urophyllum rostratum Valeton
- Urophyllum rufescens (Bremek.) Smedmark & B.Bremer
- Urophyllum salicifolium Stapf
- Urophyllum sandahanicum (Bremek.) Smedmark & B.Bremer
- Urophyllum schmidtii C.B.Clarke
- Urophyllum sessiliflorum Ridl.
- Urophyllum sintangense (Bremek.) Smedmark & B.Bremer
- Urophyllum streptopodium Wall. ex Hook.f.
- Urophyllum strigosum (Blume) Korth.
- Urophyllum subanurum Stapf
- Urophyllum subglabrum Merr.
- Urophyllum talangense Craib
- Urophyllum tonkinense Pit.
- Urophyllum trifurcum H.Pearson ex King
- Urophyllum tsaianum F.C.How ex H.S.Lo
- Urophyllum umbelliferum Valeton
- Urophyllum umbellulatum Miq.
- Urophyllum urdanetense Elmer
- Urophyllum villosum Wall.
- Urophyllum vulcanicum Ridl.
- Urophyllum wichmannii Valeton
- Urophyllum wollastonii Wernham
- Urophyllum woodii Merr.
- Urophyllum yatesii Ridl.
