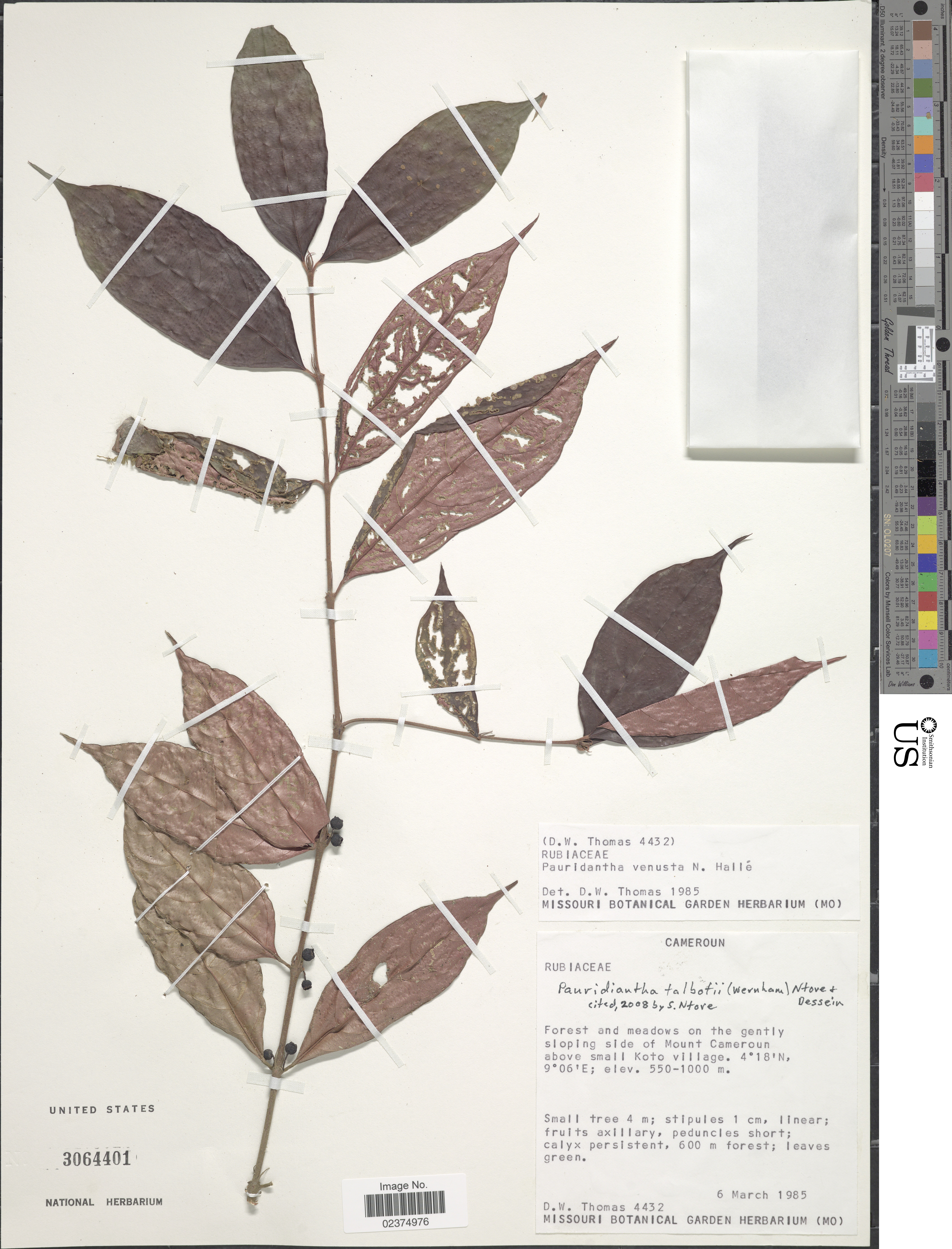

Scientific classification
- Kingdom: Plantae
- Clade: Tracheophytes
- Clade: Angiosperms
- Clade: Eudicots
- Clade: Asterids
- Order: Gentianales
- Family: Rubiaceae
- Genus: Pauridiantha
- Species: P. talbotii

Binomial name
- Pauridiantha talbotii (Wernham) Ntore & Dessein

Synonyms
- Pauridiantha venusta N.Hallé; Urophyllum talbotii Wernham

= Pauridiantha talbotii =

Species of plant

Pauridiantha talbotii, synonym Pauridiantha venusta, is a species of plant in the family Rubiaceae. It is native to Cameroon, Equatorial Guinea, Gabon and Nigeria.

== Conservation ==
Pauridiantha venusta was assessed as "vulnerable" in the 2004 IUCN Red List, where it is said to be native only to Cameroon and Gabon, being found in subtropical or tropical moist lowland forests. As of February 2023, P. venusta was regarded as a synonym of Pauridiantha talbotii, which has a wider distribution, being found also in Equatorial Guinea and Nigeria.
