= Rhaphidura lowii =

Scientific classification
- Kingdom: Plantae
- Clade: Tracheophytes
- Clade: Angiosperms
- Clade: Eudicots
- Clade: Asterids
- Order: Gentianales
- Family: Rubiaceae
- Subfamily: Rubioideae
- Tribe: Urophylleae (?)
- Genus: Rhaphidura; Bremek.
- Species: R. lowii

Binomial name
- Rhaphidura lowii (Ridl.) Bremek.

Synonyms
- Urophyllum lowii Ridl.

Species of plant

Rhaphidura lowii is a species of plant in the family Rubiaceae, the sole species in the monotypic genus Rhaphidura. It is endemic to Borneo, where it is known only from Sarawak state. It is tentatively placed in the tribe Urophylleae, but was not included in a 2011 molecular phylogenetic study of that tribe.
