= Pauridiantha insularis =

Conservation status
- Vulnerable (IUCN 2.3)

Scientific classification
- Kingdom: Plantae
- Clade: Tracheophytes
- Clade: Angiosperms
- Clade: Eudicots
- Clade: Asterids
- Order: Gentianales
- Family: Rubiaceae
- Genus: Pauridiantha
- Species: P. insularis

Binomial name
- Pauridiantha insularis (Hiern) Bremek.

Synonyms
- Urophyllum insulare Hiern

Species of plant

Pauridiantha insularis is a species of plant in the family Rubiaceae. It is endemic to São Tomé Island.
