= Antherostele =

Scientific classification
- Kingdom: Plantae
- Clade: Tracheophytes
- Clade: Angiosperms
- Clade: Eudicots
- Clade: Asterids
- Order: Gentianales
- Family: Rubiaceae
- Subfamily: Rubioideae
- Tribe: Urophylleae
- Genus: Antherostele; Bremek.

Genus of plants

Antherostele is a genus of flowering plants in the family Rubiaceae. It is endemic to the Philippines.

== Species ==
Five species are accepted.

- Antherostele banahaensis (Elmer) Bremek. – Luzon
- Antherostele callophylla Bremek. – Luzon
- Antherostele grandistipula (Merr.) Bremek. – Leyte
- Antherostele luzoniensis (Merr.) Bremek. – Luzon
- Antherostele samarensis Obico & Alejandro
