= Amphidasya elegans =

Scientific classification
- Kingdom: Plantae
- Clade: Tracheophytes
- Clade: Angiosperms
- Clade: Eudicots
- Clade: Asterids
- Order: Gentianales
- Family: Rubiaceae
- Genus: Amphidasya
- Species: A. elegans

Binomial name
- Amphidasya elegans C.M.Taylor, 2001

Species of plant

Amphidasya elegans is a species of flowering plants in the family Rubiaceae. It is found in Colombia and Ecuador.
