= Urophyllum ellipticum =

Conservation status
- Vulnerable (IUCN 2.3)

Scientific classification
- Kingdom: Plantae
- Clade: Tracheophytes
- Clade: Angiosperms
- Clade: Eudicots
- Clade: Asterids
- Order: Gentianales
- Family: Rubiaceae
- Genus: Urophyllum
- Species: U. ellipticum

Binomial name
- Urophyllum ellipticum (Wight) Thwaites

Species of plant

Urophyllum ellipticum is a species of plant in the family Rubiaceae. It is endemic to Sri Lanka.
