= Pauridiantha arcuata =

Conservation status
- Critically Endangered (IUCN 3.1)

Scientific classification
- Kingdom: Plantae
- Clade: Tracheophytes
- Clade: Angiosperms
- Clade: Eudicots
- Clade: Asterids
- Order: Gentianales
- Family: Rubiaceae
- Genus: Pauridiantha
- Species: P. arcuata

Binomial name
- Pauridiantha arcuata (S.E.Dawson) Smedmark & B.Bremer

Synonyms
- Stelechantha arcuata S.E.Dawson

Species of plant

Pauridiantha arcuata, synonym Stelechantha arcuata, is a species of plant in the family Rubiaceae. It is endemic to Cameroon. Its natural habitat is subtropical or tropical moist lowland forests. It is threatened by habitat loss.
