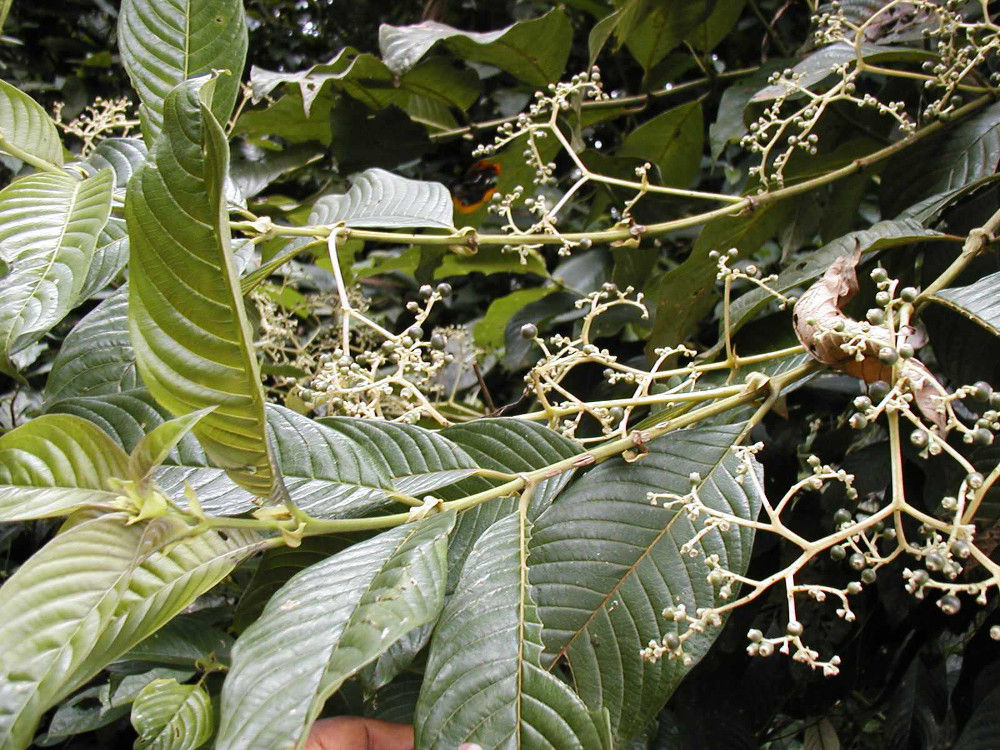
- Pauridiantha floribunda

Scientific classification
- Kingdom: Plantae
- Clade: Tracheophytes
- Clade: Angiosperms
- Clade: Eudicots
- Clade: Asterids
- Order: Gentianales
- Family: Rubiaceae
- Subfamily: Rubioideae
- Tribe: Urophylleae
- Genus: Pauridiantha; Hook.f.

Synonyms
- Commitheca Bremek.; Pamplethantha Bremek.; Poecilocalyx Bremek.; Rhipidantha Bremek.; Stelechantha Bremek.

= Pauridiantha =

Genus of plants

Pauridiantha is an afrotropical genus of plant in family Rubiaceae.

== Species ==
As of March 2023, Plants of the World Online accepted the following species:

- Pauridiantha afzelii (Hiern) Bremek.
- Pauridiantha arcuata (S.E.Dawson) Smedmark & B.Bremer
- Pauridiantha barbata Ntore & Dessein
- Pauridiantha bequaertii (De Wild.) Bremek.
- Pauridiantha bridelioides Verdc.
- Pauridiantha callicarpoides (Hiern) Bremek.
- Pauridiantha canthiiflora Hook.f.
- Pauridiantha cauliflora (R.D.Good) Smedmark & B.Bremer
- Pauridiantha chlorantha (K.Schum.) Ntore & O.Lachenaud
- Pauridiantha coalescens Ntore & Dessein
- Pauridiantha crystallina (N.Hallé) Smedmark & B.Bremer
- Pauridiantha dewevrei (De Wild. & T.Durand) Bremek.
- Pauridiantha divaricata (K.Schum.) Bremek.
- Pauridiantha efferata N.Hallé
- Pauridiantha floribunda (K.Schum. & K.Krause) Bremek.
- Pauridiantha gracilipes O.Lachenaud & Ntore
- Pauridiantha halleana Ntore & O.Lachenaud
- Pauridiantha hirsuta Ntore
- Pauridiantha hirtella (Benth.) Bremek.
- Pauridiantha insularis (Hiern) Bremek.
- Pauridiantha kahuziensis Ntore
- Pauridiantha letestuana (N.Hallé) Ntore & Dessein
- Pauridiantha liberiensis Ntore
- Pauridiantha liebrechtsiana (De Wild. & T.Durand) Ntore & Dessein
- Pauridiantha longistipula Ntore & Dessein
- Pauridiantha makakana (N.Hallé) Smedmark & B.Bremer
- Pauridiantha mayumbensis (R.D.Good) Bremek.
- Pauridiantha micrantha Bremek.
- Pauridiantha muhakiensis Ntore
- Pauridiantha multiflora K.Schum.
- Pauridiantha paucinervis (Hiern) Bremek.
- Pauridiantha pierlotii N.Hallé
- Pauridiantha pleiantha Ntore & Dessein
- Pauridiantha principensis Ntore & O.Lachenaud
- Pauridiantha pyramidata (K.Krause) Bremek.
- Pauridiantha rubens (Benth.) Bremek.
- Pauridiantha schnellii N.Hallé
- Pauridiantha schumannii (Bremek.) Smedmark & B.Bremer
- Pauridiantha setiflora (R.D.Good) Smedmark & B.Bremer
- Pauridiantha siderophila N.Hallé
- Pauridiantha smetsiana Ntore & Dessein
- Pauridiantha stipulosa (Hutch. & Dalziel) Hepper
- Pauridiantha sylvicola (Hutch. & Dalziel) Bremek.
- Pauridiantha symplocoides (S.Moore) Bremek.
- Pauridiantha talbotii (Wernham) Ntore & Dessein
- Pauridiantha triflora Ntore & Dessein
- Pauridiantha udzungwaensis Ntore & Dessein
- Pauridiantha uniflora Ntore & Dessein
- Pauridiantha verticillata (De Wild. & T.Durand) N.Hallé
- Pauridiantha viridiflora (Schweinf. ex Hiern) Hepper
- Pauridiantha ziamaeana (Jacq.-Fél.) Hepper
