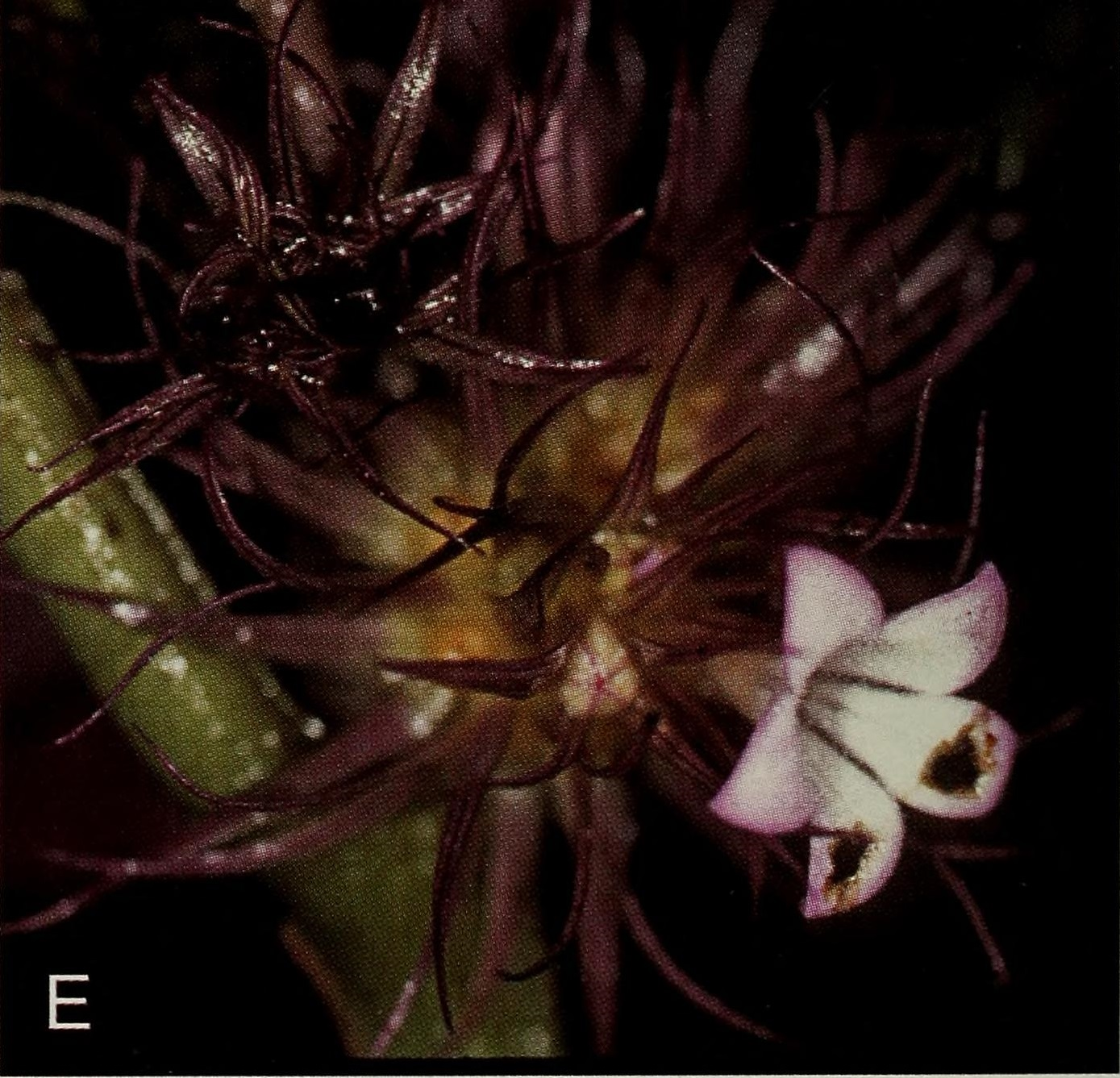
- Amphidasya amethystina

Scientific classification
- Kingdom: Plantae
- Clade: Embryophytes
- Clade: Tracheophytes
- Clade: Spermatophytes
- Clade: Angiosperms
- Clade: Eudicots
- Clade: Asterids
- Order: Gentianales
- Family: Rubiaceae
- Subfamily: Rubioideae
- Tribe: Urophylleae
- Genus: Amphidasya; Standl.

Type species
- Amphidasya ambigua (Standl.) Standl.

Synonyms
- Pittierothamnus Steyerm.

= Amphidasya =

Genus of plants

Amphidasya is a genus of flowering plants in the family Rubiaceae. It was described by Paul Carpenter Standley in 1936. The genus is found in Central America and northern South America.

== Species ==
- Amphidasya ambigua (Standl.) Standl. - Panama, Colombia, Ecuador
- Amphidasya amethystina J.L.Clark & C.M.Taylor - Ecuador
- Amphidasya brevidentata C.M.Taylor - Colombia
- Amphidasya bullata Standl. - Colombia
- Amphidasya colombiana (Standl.) Steyerm. - Colombia, Ecuador, Peru
- Amphidasya elegans C.M.Taylor - Colombia, Ecuador
- Amphidasya intermedia Steyerm. - Colombia
- Amphidasya longicalycina (Dwyer) C.M.Taylor - Costa Rica, Nicaragua, Panamá, Colombia
- Amphidasya neblinae Steyerm. - Venezuela, Brazil
- Amphidasya panamensis C.M.Taylor - Panamá
- Amphidasya spathulata Dwyer - Panamá, Colombia
- Amphidasya umbrosa (Wernham) Standl. - Colombia
- Amphidasya venezuelensis (Standl.) Steyerm. - Venezuela
