= Pauridiantha chlorantha =

Conservation status
- Vulnerable (IUCN 2.3)

Scientific classification
- Kingdom: Plantae
- Clade: Tracheophytes
- Clade: Angiosperms
- Clade: Eudicots
- Clade: Asterids
- Order: Gentianales
- Family: Rubiaceae
- Genus: Pauridiantha
- Species: P. chlorantha

Binomial name
- Pauridiantha chlorantha (K.Schum.) Ntore & O.Lachenaud

Synonyms
- Rhipidantha chlorantha (K.Schum.) Bremek.; Urophyllum chloranthum K.Schum.

Genus of plants

Pauridiantha chlorantha is a species of plant in the family Rubiaceae. It is endemic to Tanzania. Under the synonym Rhipidantha chlorantha, it was the only species in the monotypic genus Rhipidantha.
