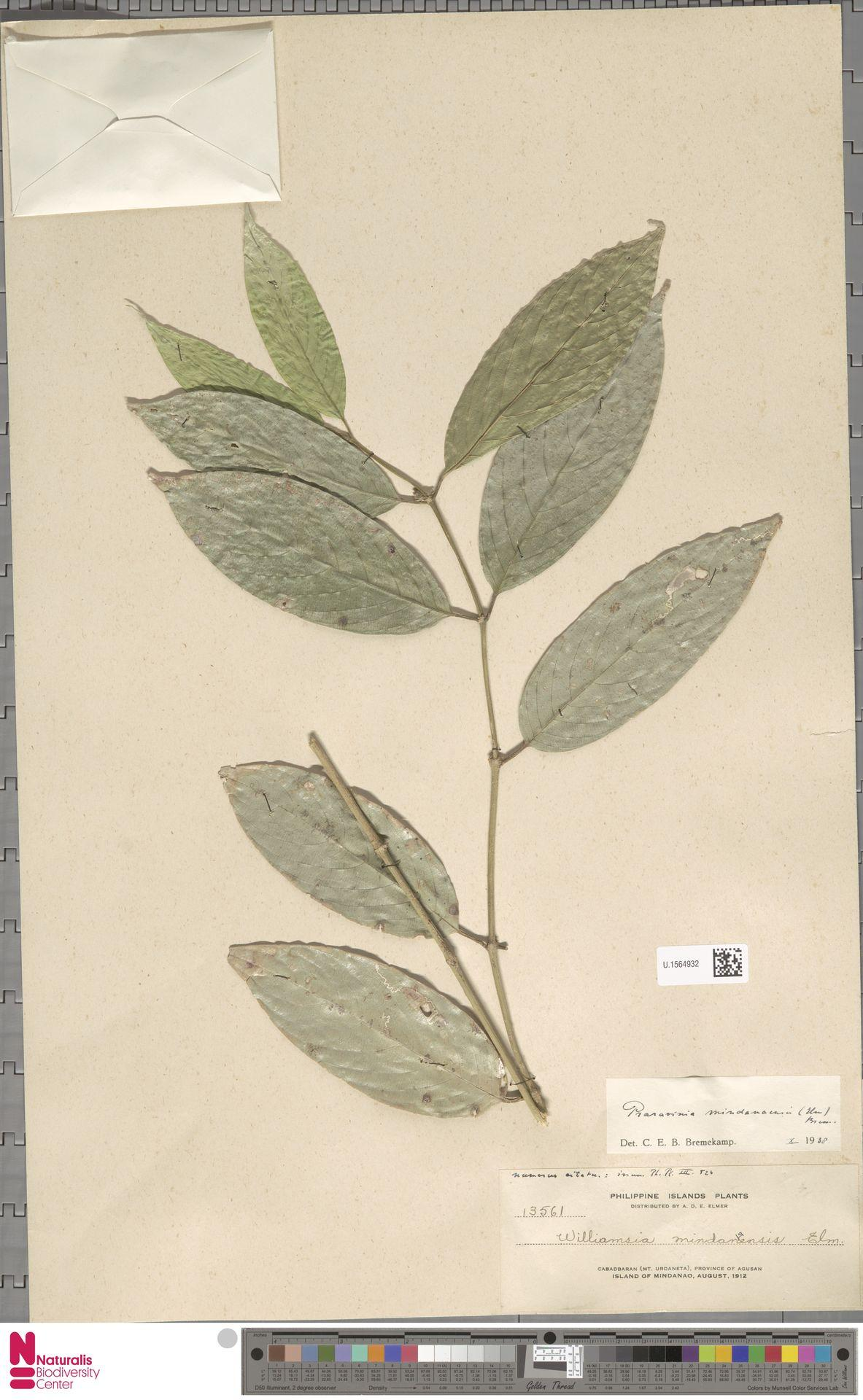
- Williamsia mindanaensis Elmer (type of) - Praravinia mindanaensis (Merr.) Bremek. (species)

Scientific classification
- Kingdom: Plantae
- Clade: Tracheophytes
- Clade: Angiosperms
- Clade: Eudicots
- Clade: Asterids
- Order: Gentianales
- Family: Rubiaceae
- Genus: Praravinia; Korth.

= Praravinia =

Genus of plants

Praravinia is a genus of flowering plants belonging to the family Rubiaceae.

Its native range is Malesia.

Species:

- Praravinia acuminata (Merr.) Bremek.
- Praravinia affinis (Merr.) Bremek.
- Praravinia borneensis (Merr.) Bremek.
- Praravinia bullata Bremek.
- Praravinia cauliflora Bremek.
- Praravinia celebica Bremek.
- Praravinia chalcotricha Bremek.
- Praravinia coriacea Bremek.
- Praravinia creaghii (Ridl.) Bremek.
- Praravinia densiflora Korth.
- Praravinia everettii Merr.
- Praravinia glabra (Merr.) Bremek.
- Praravinia gracilis Bremek.
- Praravinia hallieri Bremek.
- Praravinia havilandii (Ridl.) Bremek.
- Praravinia hexamera Bremek.
- Praravinia loconensis Bremek.
- Praravinia loheri (Merr.) Bremek.
- Praravinia longicalyx Koizumi & Nagam.
- Praravinia longistipula (Merr.) Bremek.
- Praravinia lucbanensis (Elmer) Bremek.
- Praravinia megistocalyx Bremek.
- Praravinia microphylla (Merr.) Bremek.
- Praravinia mimica (Merr.) Bremek.
- Praravinia minahassae Koord.
- Praravinia mindanaensis (Elmer) Bremek.
- Praravinia mollis Bremek.
- Praravinia montana Bremek.
- Praravinia multinervia (Merr.) Bremek.
- Praravinia negrosensis (Merr.) Bremek.
- Praravinia neriifolia Bremek.
- Praravinia nitida Koizumi & Nagam.
- Praravinia panayensis (Merr.) Bremek.
- Praravinia parviflora Bremek.
- Praravinia polymera Bremek.
- Praravinia pubescens (Quisumb. & Merr.) Bremek.
- Praravinia quadribracteolata (Merr.) Bremek.
- Praravinia robusta Bremek.
- Praravinia sablanensis (Elmer) Bremek.
- Praravinia salicifolia Bremek.
- Praravinia sarawacensis Bremek.
- Praravinia sericotricha Bremek.
- Praravinia stenophylla (Merr.) Bremek.
- Praravinia suberosa (Merr.) Bremek.
- Praravinia subtomentosa Bremek.
- Praravinia teysmannii Koord.
- Praravinia triflora (Quisumb. & Merr.) Bremek.
- Praravinia urophylloides Valeton
- Praravinia verruculosa Bremek.
- Praravinia viridescens (Elmer) Bremek.
