= Denscantia =

Scientific classification
- Kingdom: Plantae
- Clade: Tracheophytes
- Clade: Angiosperms
- Clade: Eudicots
- Clade: Asterids
- Order: Gentianales
- Family: Rubiaceae
- Genus: Denscantia; E.L.Cabral & Bacigalupo

Synonyms
- Scandentia E.L.Cabral & Bacigalupo

Genus of plants

Denscantia is a genus of flowering plants in the family Rubiaceae. The genus is native to the Atlantic Forest of eastern Brazil.

== Species ==
- Denscantia andrei E.L.Cabral & Bacigalupo - southeastern Bahia
- Denscantia cymosa (Spreng.) E.L.Cabral & Bacigalupo - eastern Brazil
- Denscantia macrobracteata E.L.Cabral & Bacigalupo - eastern Bahia
- Denscantia monodon (K.Schum.) E.L.Cabral & Bacigalupo - eastern Bahia

=== Formerly placed here ===
- Leonoria calcicola (R.M.Salas & E.L.Cabral) Nuñez Florentin & R.M.Salas (as Denscantia calcicola R.M.Salas & E.L.Cabral)
