= Leonoria =

Scientific classification
- Kingdom: Plantae
- Clade: Tracheophytes
- Clade: Angiosperms
- Clade: Eudicots
- Clade: Asterids
- Order: Gentianales
- Family: Rubiaceae
- Genus: Leonoria
- Species: L. calcicola

Binomial name
- Leonoria calcicola (R.M.Salas & E.L.Cabral) Nuñez Florentin & R.M.Salas

Synonyms
- Denscantia calcicola R.M.Salas & E.L.Cabral

Genus of flowering plants

Leonoria is a genus of flowering plants in the family Rubiaceae. It includes a single species, Leonoria calcicola, which is endemic to Bahia state in northeastern Brazil. It grows only on limestone outcrops in seasonally dry tropical forests.

The species was first described as Denscantia calcicola in 2012 by Roberto M. Salas and Elsa Leonor Cabral. In 2024 Mariela Nuñez Florentin et al. published a phylogenetic and morphological analysis which concluded that the species was distinct from other Denscantia species, with differences in inflorescence organization, style shape, fruit dehiscence, pollen morphology, and leaf anatomy. The authors placed the species in the new monotypic genus Leonoria, which they named after Cabral.
