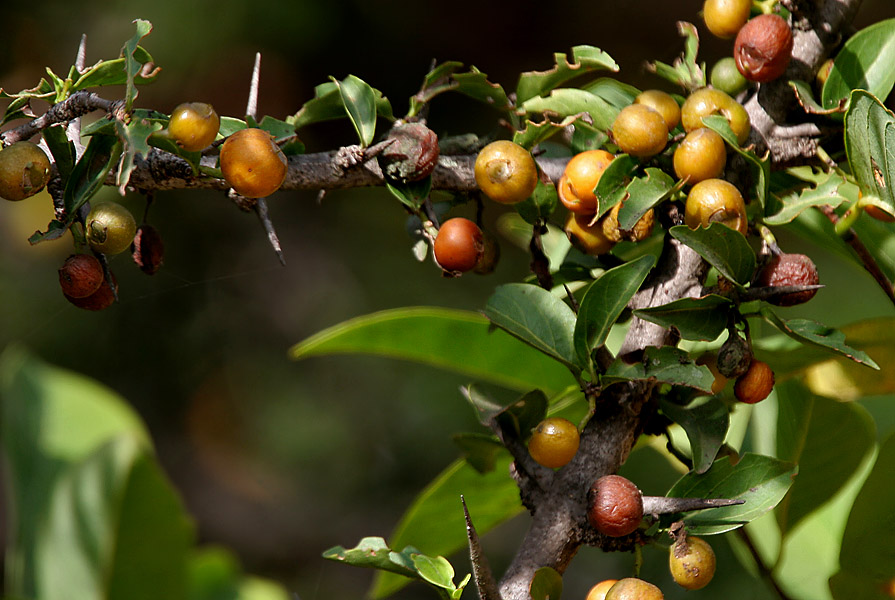
- Canthium coromandelicum

Scientific classification
- Kingdom: Plantae
- Clade: Tracheophytes
- Clade: Angiosperms
- Clade: Eudicots
- Clade: Asterids
- Order: Gentianales
- Family: Rubiaceae
- Subfamily: Dialypetalanthoideae
- Tribe: Vanguerieae; A.Rich. ex Dumort.

Type genus
- Vangueria Juss.

= Vanguerieae =

Tribe of flowering plants

Vanguerieae is a tribe of flowering plants in the family Rubiaceae and contains 671 species in 29 genera. It is one of the most species-rich groups within the family and it is distributed across the Paleotropics.

== Description ==
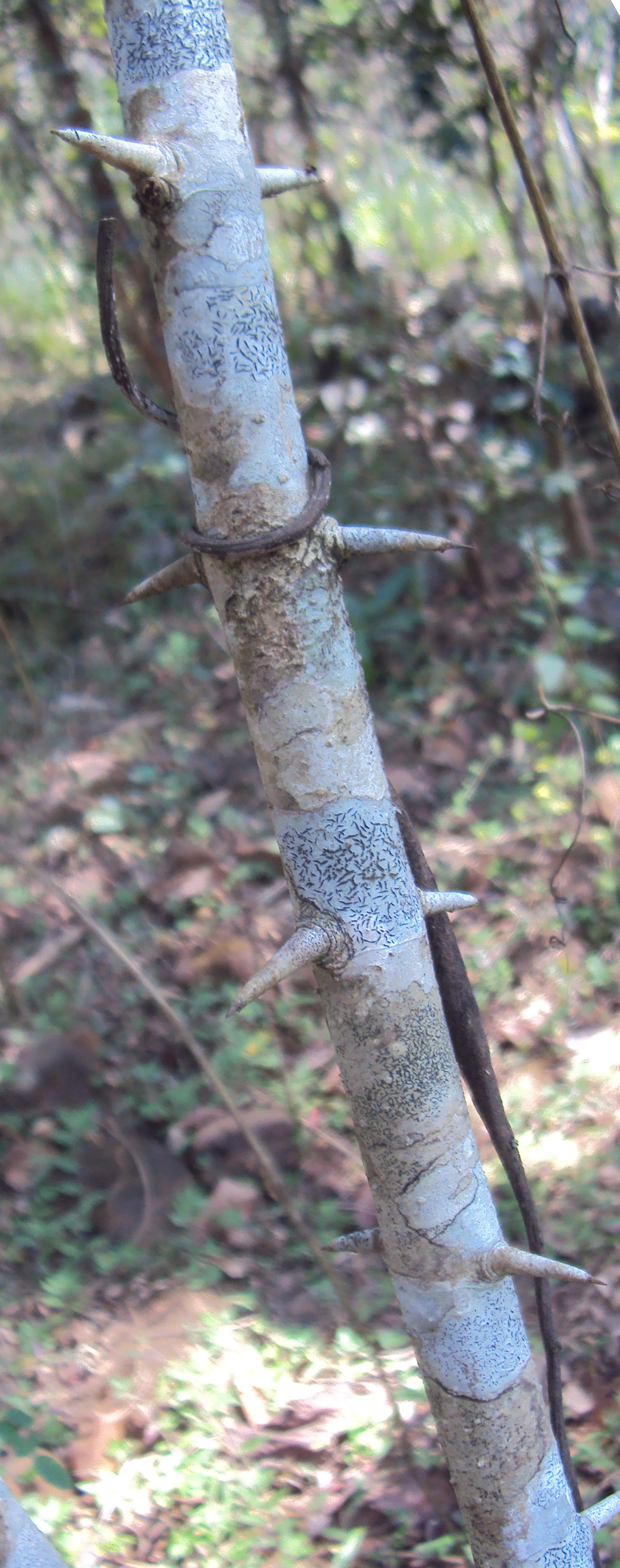
Spines on Canthium angustifolium

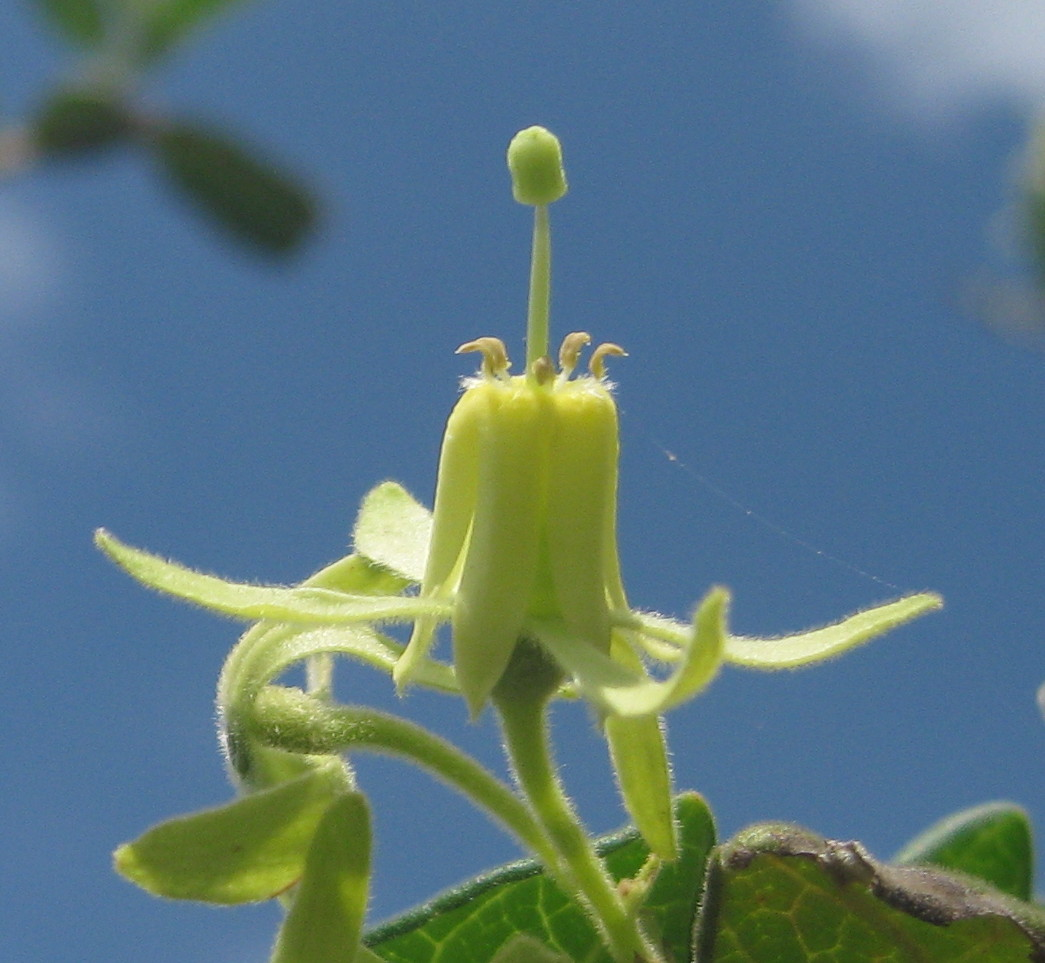
Stylar head-complex of Vangueria dryadum

Several different life forms are present in the tribe: most species are shrubs, but geofructices (plants with woody rhizomes) (e.g. Fadogia homblei, Pygmaeothamnus zeyheri), small trees (e.g. Vangueria infausta), and climbers (e.g. Keetia gueinzii) also occur. As all Rubiaceae species, the leaves are opposite, simple and entire, and they have interpetiolar stipules. The phyllotaxis is decussate, sometimes conspicuously so (e.g. Canthium inerme), and rarely whorled (e.g. Fadogia). Some species have spines (e.g. Canthium). Secondary pollen presentation is characteristic for the tribe and the species develop a conspicuous "stylar head"-complex, which is a structural unit consisting of a pollen presenting organ combined with stigmatic surfaces.

== Distribution and habitat ==
The species of this tribe are found in the Paleotropics. Most genera and over 70% of the species occur in Sub-Saharan Africa, including Madagascar and the islands in the Western Indian Ocean. The remainder of the species is mostly found in Southeast Asia. A few species are restricted to islands in the Pacific Ocean, especially New Caledonia, and another fraction of the species occurs in the Eastern states of Australia, especially in coastal Queensland. The countries with the largest diversity with over a hundred species each are Tanzania, Madagascar and D.R.Congo.

The tribe is characterized by a high degree of endemism. Several monotypic genera have a restricted distribution range: Eriosemopsis is found in the KwaZulu-Natal province of South Africa, Everistia occurs in the Eastern states of Australia, Perakanthus occurs in Peninsular Malaysia, and Temnocalyx is only found in southwestern Tanzania. Other larger genera with a restricted range are Cyclophyllum that is mainly found in New Caledonia, Peponidium that is only found on Madagascar or the Comoros, and Pyrostria of which most species are restricted to Madagascar.

The tribe is a common and important constituent of many different kinds of habitats. Species of Vanguerieae are found in both extreme wet habitats, such as the rainforests of tropical Africa, and in the very dry desert-like areas of the horn of Africa and of the southernmost part of Madagascar. The tribe is found at elevations of over 2,000 m (6,600 ft) in the mountains of Malawi and Tanzania, but also at sea-level along the coast of South Africa.

== Ecology ==
There is a wide range of flower sizes and fruit morphologies, suggesting different adaptations to pollination and dispersal. Most of the species are probably pollinated by insects, but it is suspected that at least some of the large-flowered species of Fadogia are bird-pollinated. The edibility of many fruits suggests that they are dispersed by animals.

Almost 30% of the species within the tribe have a symbiosis with endophytic bacteria, which are mostly found intercellularly within the leaves. The presence of such bacteria is consistent on a genus level and all species belong to the following 5 genera: Fadogia, Fadogiella, Globulostylis, Rytigynia, and Vangueria. The bacteria are identified as Burkholderia, which is a genus that is also found in the leaves of other Rubiaceae species. Bacterial leaf nodules were observed in Keetia nodulosa, although without microscopic and molecular confirmation for now. The hypothesis is that these endophytic bacteria provide chemical protection against insect herbivory.

== Uses ==
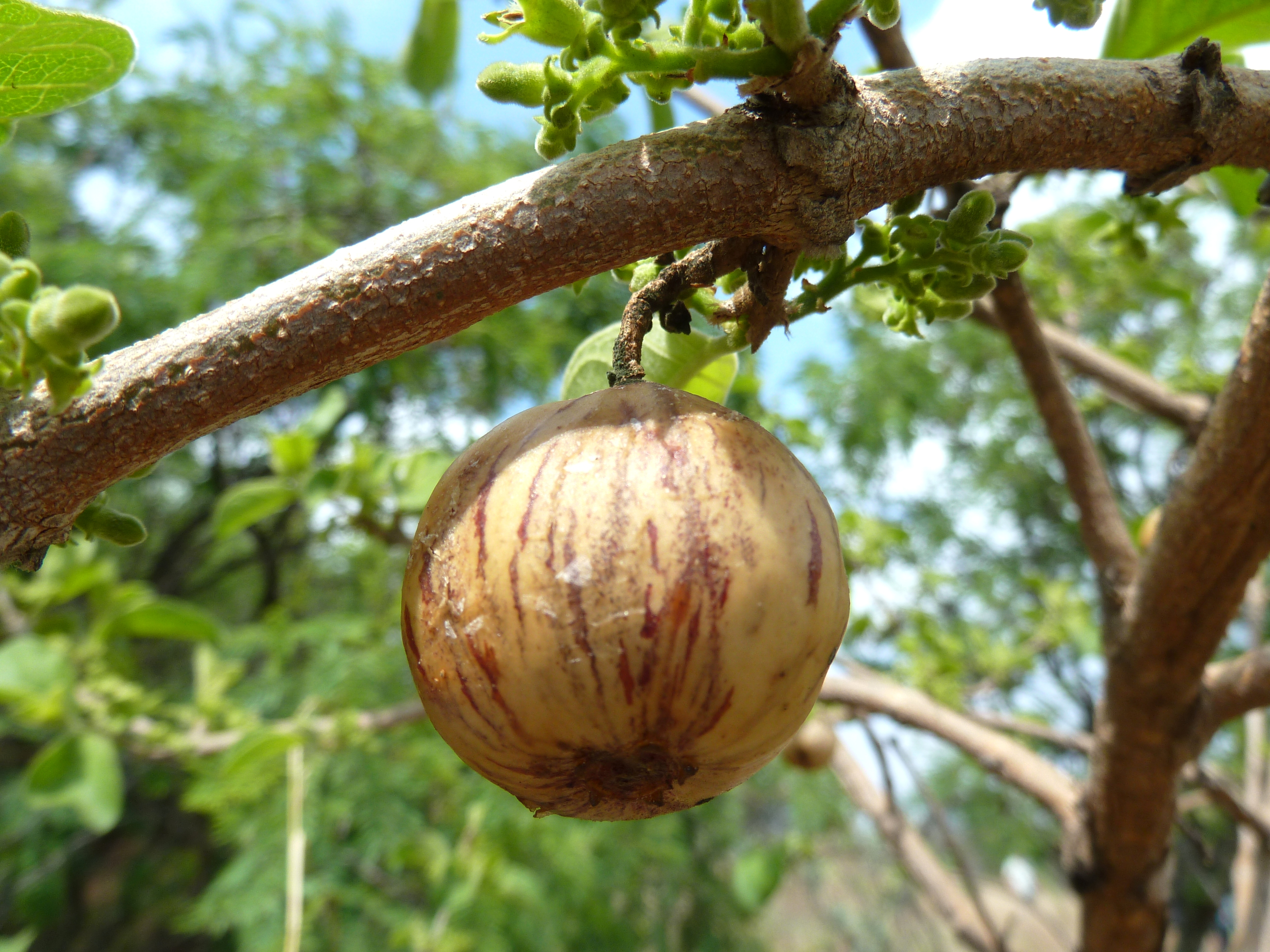
Ripe fruit of Vangueria infausta

Some species are consumed locally and fruits may be used as famine food. Examples are African medlar (Vangueria infausta) and Spanish tamarind (Vangueria madagascariensis), but the fruits of other Vangueria and Fadogia species are edible too.

In West Africa, Vangueria agrestis (known under its synonym Fadogia agrestis) is traditionally used as an aphrodisiac. It is known as bakin gagai (Hausa) or black aphrodisiac.

== Systematics ==
=== Taxonomy ===
The first genus of the tribe to be described was Canthium, containing the species C. coronatum (now Catunaregam spinosa in the Gardenieae tribe) and C. parviflorum (now C. coromandelicum). The second genus to be described was Psydrax, containing the species Psydrax dicoccos. Although the tribe is predominantly found in Africa, these first described species are Asiatic taxa. The first non-Asiatic taxa to be described were the genera Pyrostria and Vangueria, based on material collected on Western Indian Ocean islands. The first genus from continental Africa was Cuviera, with the species Cuviera acutiflora from Sierra Leone. Dumortier first mentioned a tribe Vanguerieae (as "Vaugnerieae") attributed to Achille Richard and put the genera Hamelia, Evosmia, Mitchella, "Vaugneria" (Vangueria), and Nonatelia in it. However, this circumscription of the tribe was far from correct, as Canthium and Cuviera were put in different tribes and Psydrax and Pyrostria were not even mentioned. Also, the only genus that actually belongs in the tribe is Vangueria; the other genera belong elsewhere. At that time, authors often used the number of locules as a character for delimiting groups, but this is problematic for Vanguerieae as both 2-locular (e.g. Canthium) and 5-locular (e.g. Vangueria) ovaries occur in the tribe. The first monograph of the tribe was performed by Walter Robyns in 1928 and a total of 17 genera were allocated to the tribe. Although 9 new genera were described, this work was not entirely complete, e.g. Canthium, Cuviera, and Pyrostria were not treated. Since then, several new genera have been described or made synonym and more taxonomic adjustments on genus level will probably still be necessary.

=== Genera ===
Currently accepted names

- Afrocanthium (Bridson) Lantz & B.Bremer (17 sp)
- Bridsonia Verstraete & A.E.van Wyk (1 sp)
- Bullockia (Bridson) Razafim., Lantz & B.Bremer (6 sp)
- Canthium Lam. (81 sp)
- Canthiumera K.M.Wong & Mahyuni (4 sp)
- Cuviera DC. (18 sp)
- Cyclophyllum Hook.f. (42 sp)
- Dibridsonia K.M.Wong (3 sp)
- Eriosemopsis Robyns (1 sp)
- Fadogia Schweinf. (39 sp)
- Fadogiella Robyns (3 sp)
- Globulostylis Wernham (7 sp)
- Hutchinsonia Robyns (2 sp)
- Kanapia Arriola & Alejandro (2 sp)
- Keetia E.Philipps (39 sp)
- Meyna Roxb. ex Link (9 sp)
- Multidentia Gilli (10 sp)
- Peponidium (Baill.) Arènes (48 sp)
- Perakanthus Robyns ex Ridl. (2 sp)
- Psydrax Gaertn. (97 sp)
- Pygmaeothamnus Robyns (1 sp)
- Pyrostria Comm. ex A.Juss. (76 sp)
- Robynsia Hutch. (1 sp)
- Rytigynia Blume (81 sp)
- Temnocalyx Robyns (1 sp)
- Vangueria Juss. (58 sp)
- Vangueriella Verdc. (17 sp)
- Vangueriopsis Robyns (4 sp)

Synonyms

- Ancylanthos Desf. = Vangueria
- Caranda Gaertn. = Psydrax
- Clusiophyllea Baill. = Peponidium
- Dinocanthium Bremek. = Pyrostria
- Dondisia DC. = Canthium
- Everistia S.T.Reynolds & R.J.F.Hend. = Psydrax
- Lagynias E.Mey. ex Robyns = Vangueria
- Leroyia Cavaco = Pyrostria
- Lycioserissa Roem. & Schult. = Canthium
- Mesoptera Hook.f. = Psydrax
- Mitrastigma Harv. = Psydrax
- Neoleroya Cavaco = Pyrostria
- Pachystigma Hochst. = Vangueria
- Phallaria Schumach. & Thonn. = Psydrax
- Plectronia Lour. = Canthium, Peponidium, Psydrax
- Plectroniella Robyns = Canthium
- Pseudopeponidium Homolle ex Arènes = Pyrostria
- Psilostoma Klotzsch ex Eckl. & Zeyh. = Canthium
- Rhopalobrachium Schltr. & K.Krause = Cyclophyllum
- Rytigyniopsis Capuron = Rytigynia
- Scyphochlamys Balf.f. = Pyrostria
- Tapiphyllum Robyns = Vangueria
- Vavanga Rohr = Vangueria
- Webera Cramer = Canthium
- Wittmannia Vahl = Vangueria

=== Phylogenetic relationships ===
The following phylogenetic tree is based on molecular phylogenetic studies of DNA sequences.

- Vanguerieae
  - - - - Kanapia
        - Keetia
      - Afrocanthium
    - - Psydrax
      - Everistia
      - - Cyclophyllum
        - dioecious group
          - Peponidium
          - - Bullockia
            - Pyrostria
  - - Canthium group
      - Bridsonia chamaedendrum
      - Eriosemopsis
      - - Canthium
        - Rytigynia bugoyensis
        - Rytigynia mrimaensis
        - Meyna
        - Vangueriella sect. Stenosepalae
        - Dibridsonia
        - Canthiumera
    - - - Fadogia
        - Fadogiella
        - Rytigynia
        - Hutchinsonia
      - - - Cuviera
          - Globulostylis
          - Vangueriella sect. Vangueriella
        - Vangueria group
          - Multidentia
          - - - Pygmaeothamnus zeyheri
              - Robynsia glabrata
              - Vangueriopsis
            - Vangueria

== Image gallery ==
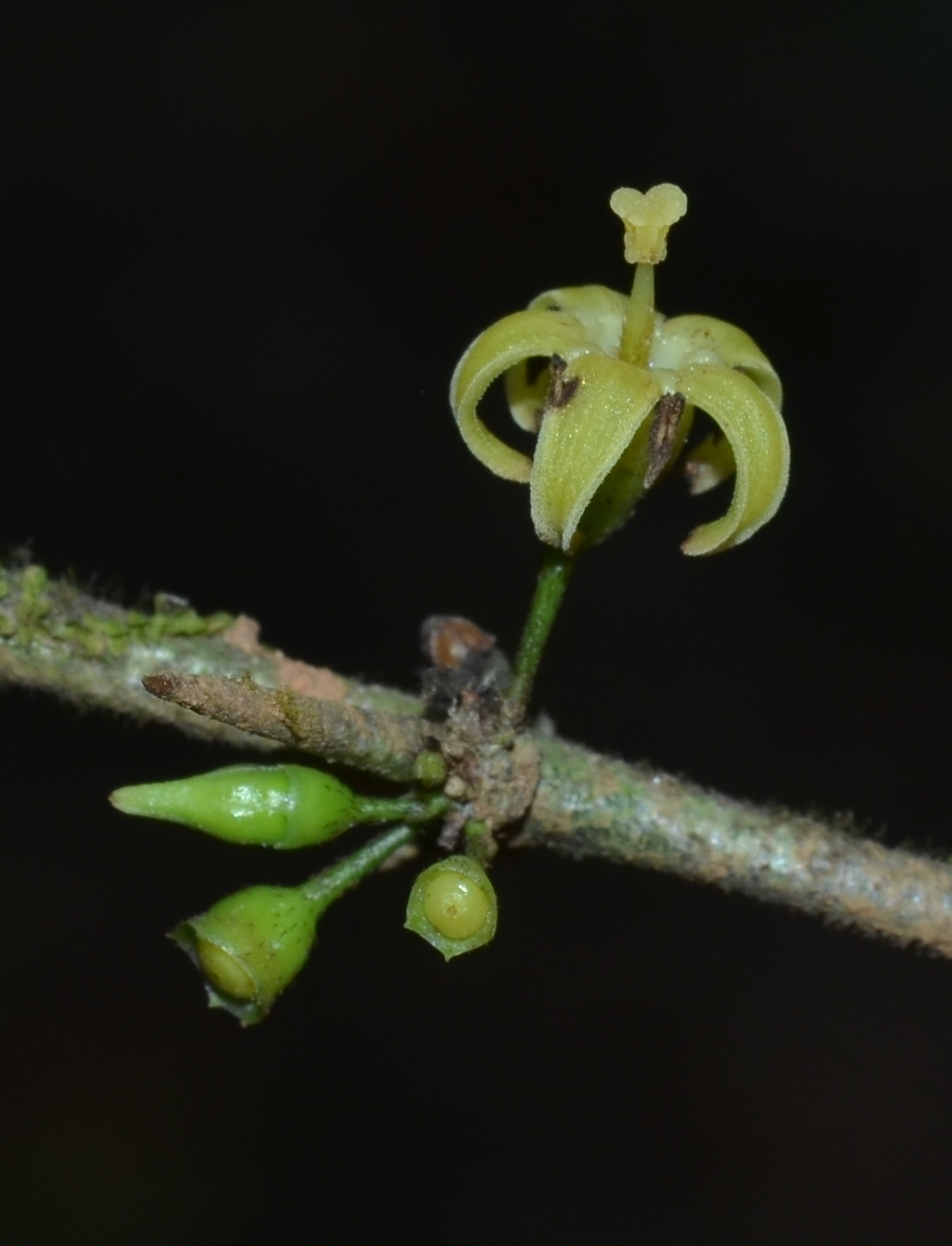
Canthium angustifolium

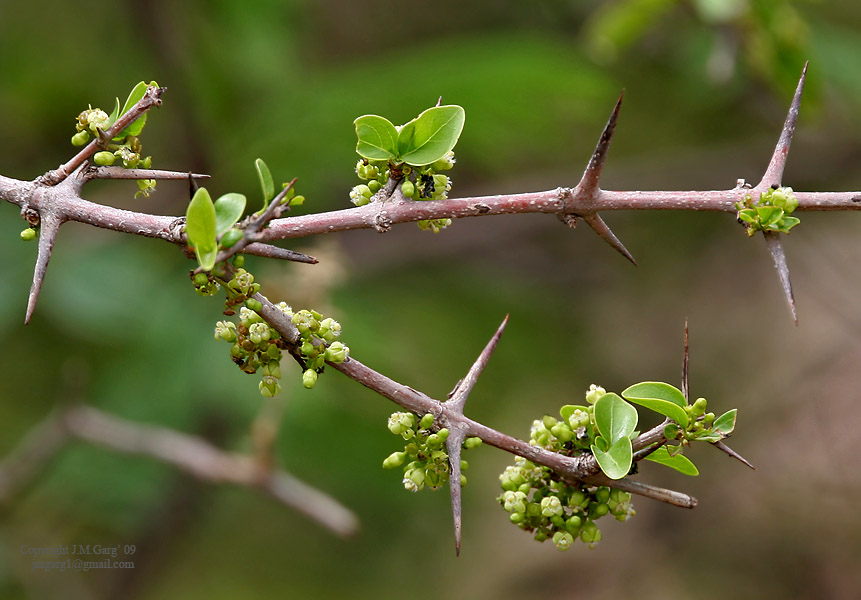
Canthium coromandelicum

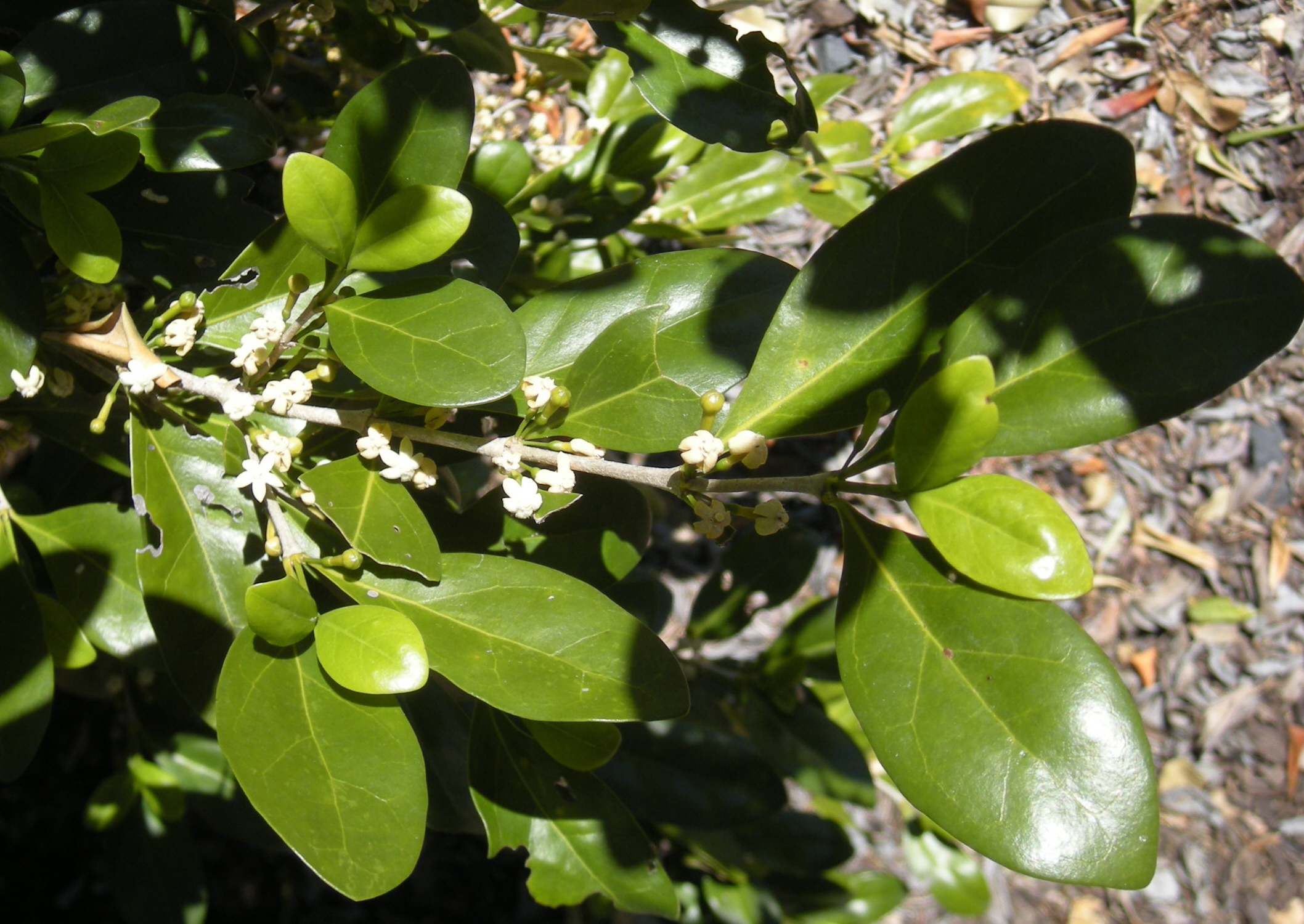
Cyclophyllum coprosmoides

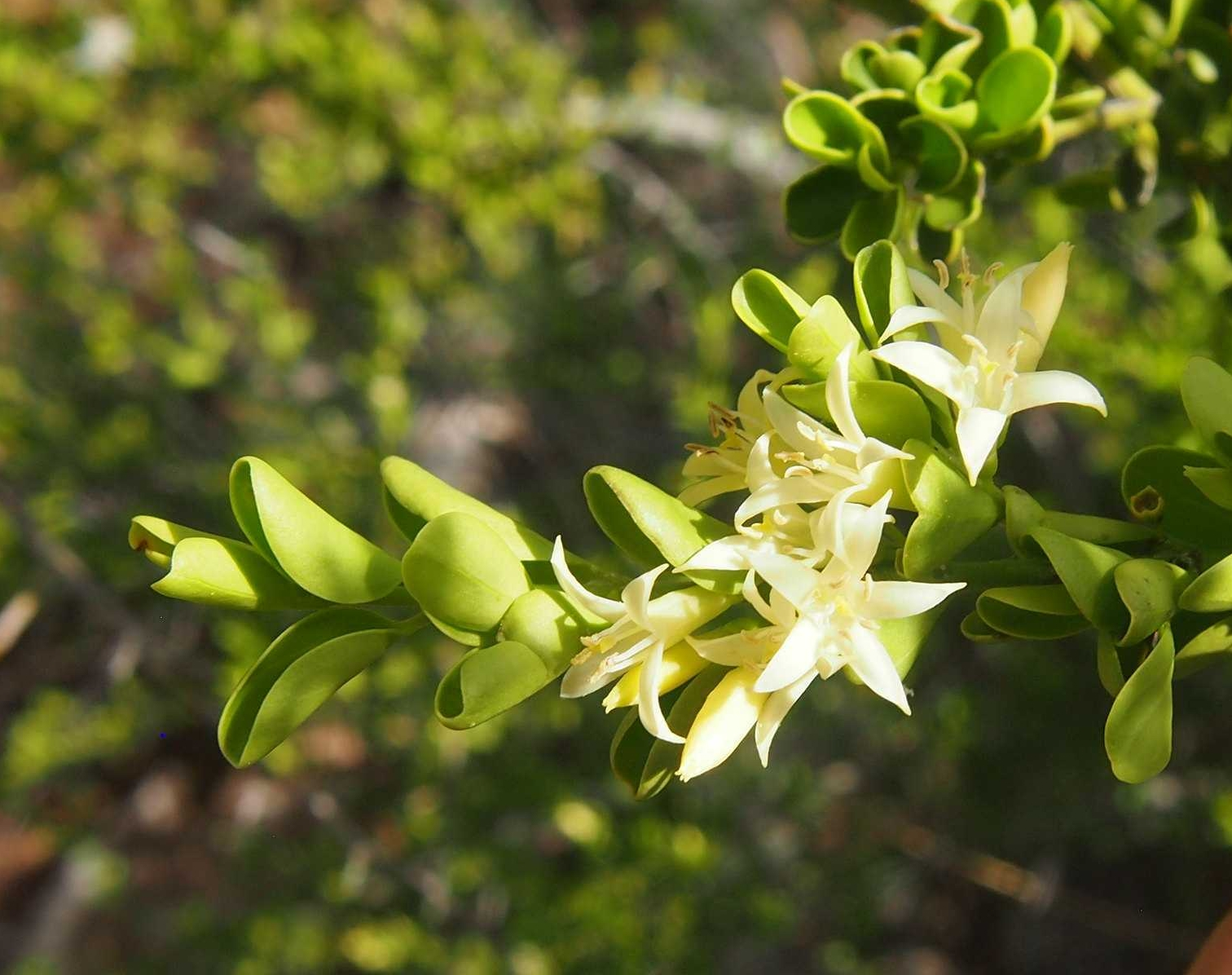
Everistia vacciniifolia

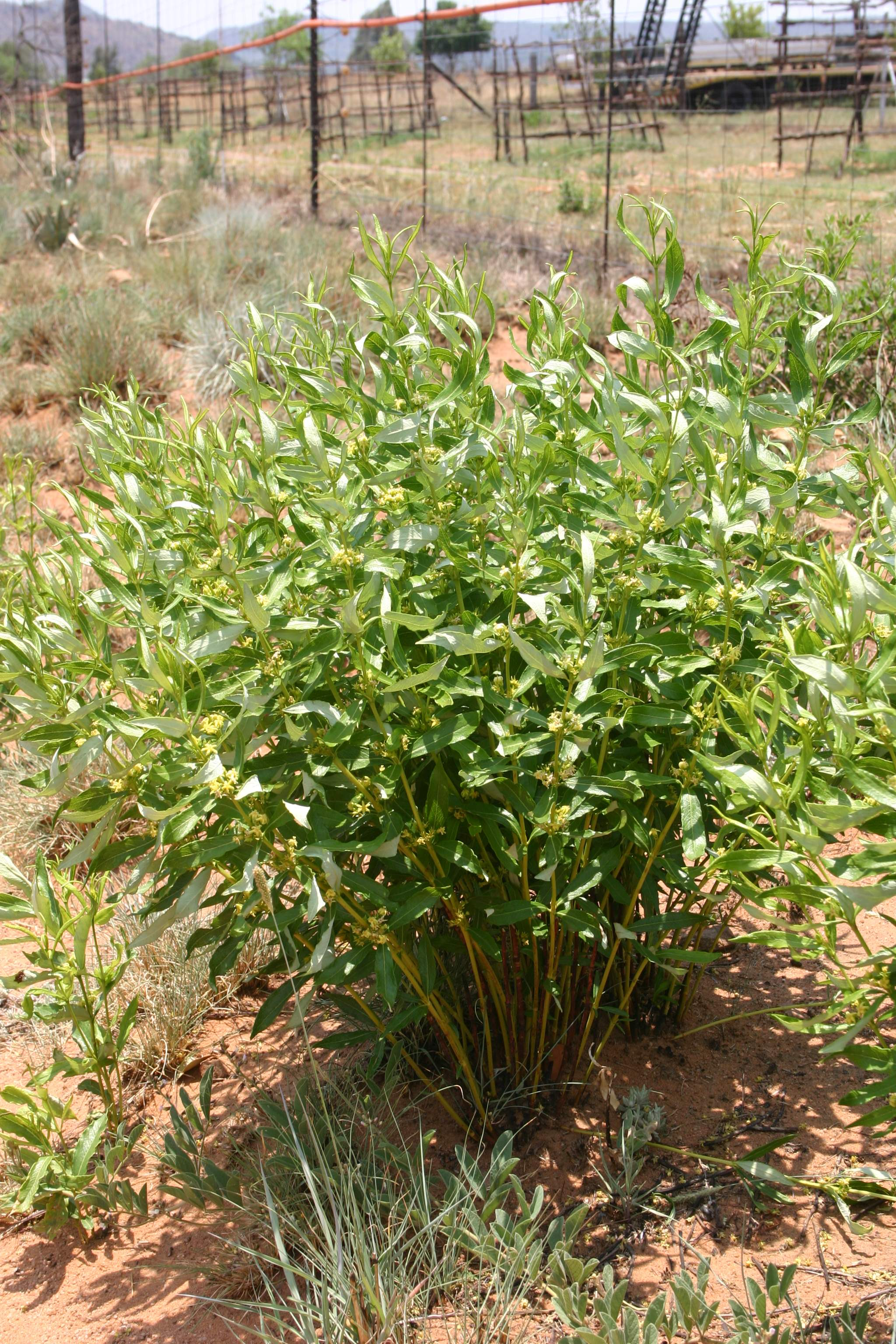
Fadogia homblei

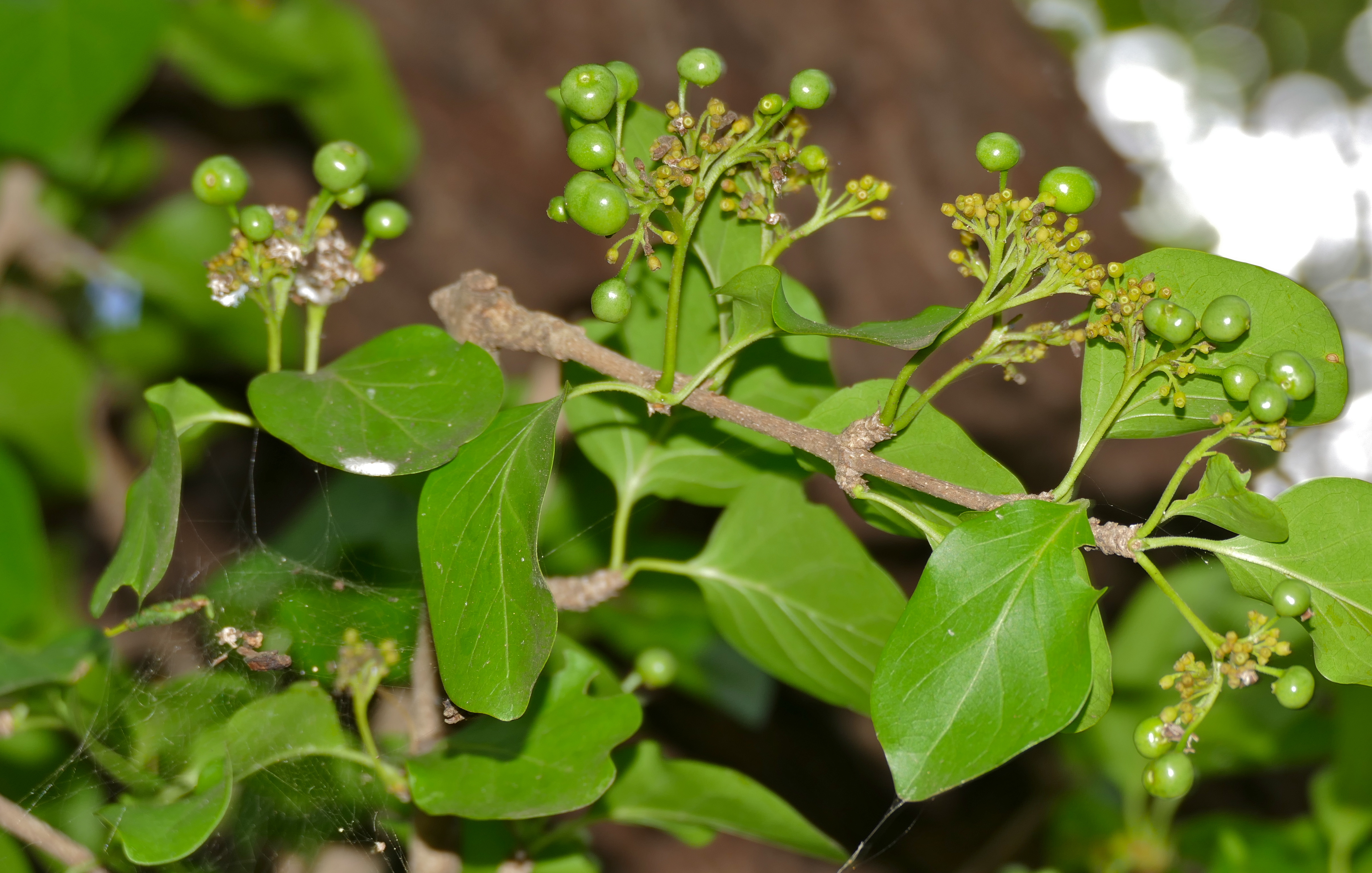
Canthium armatum

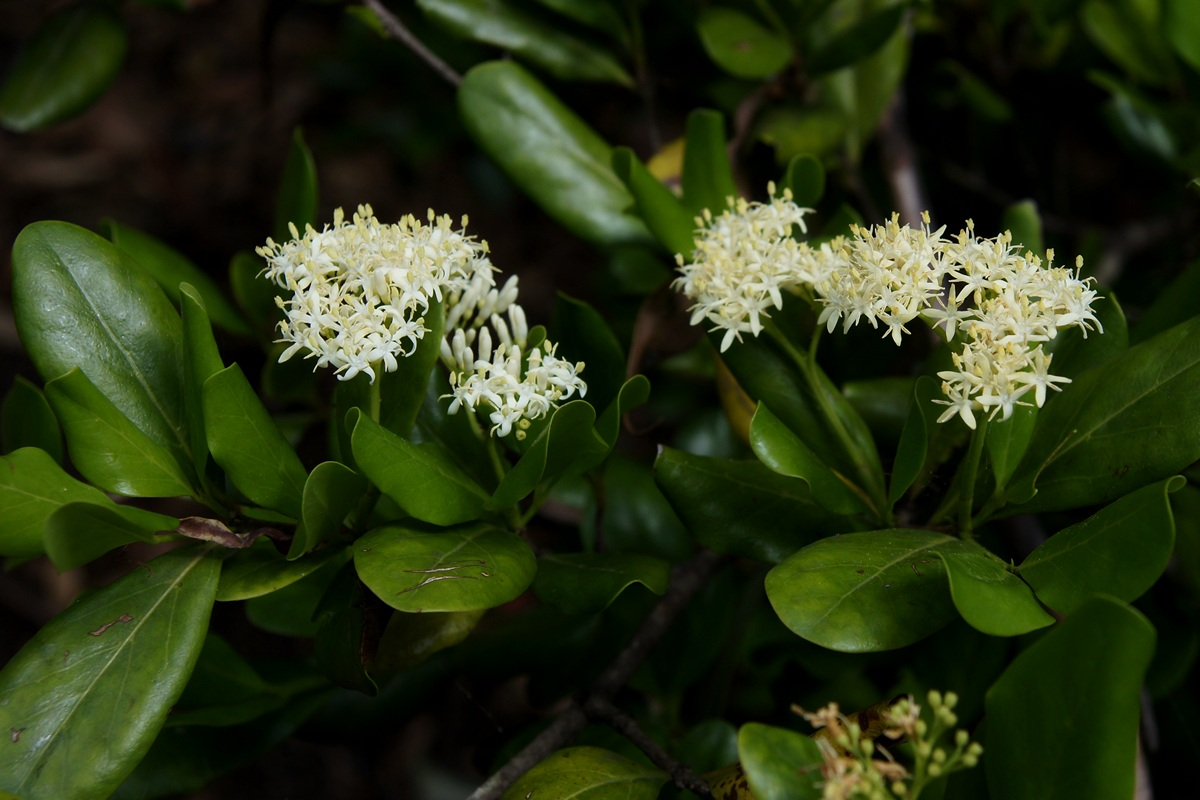
Psydrax banksii

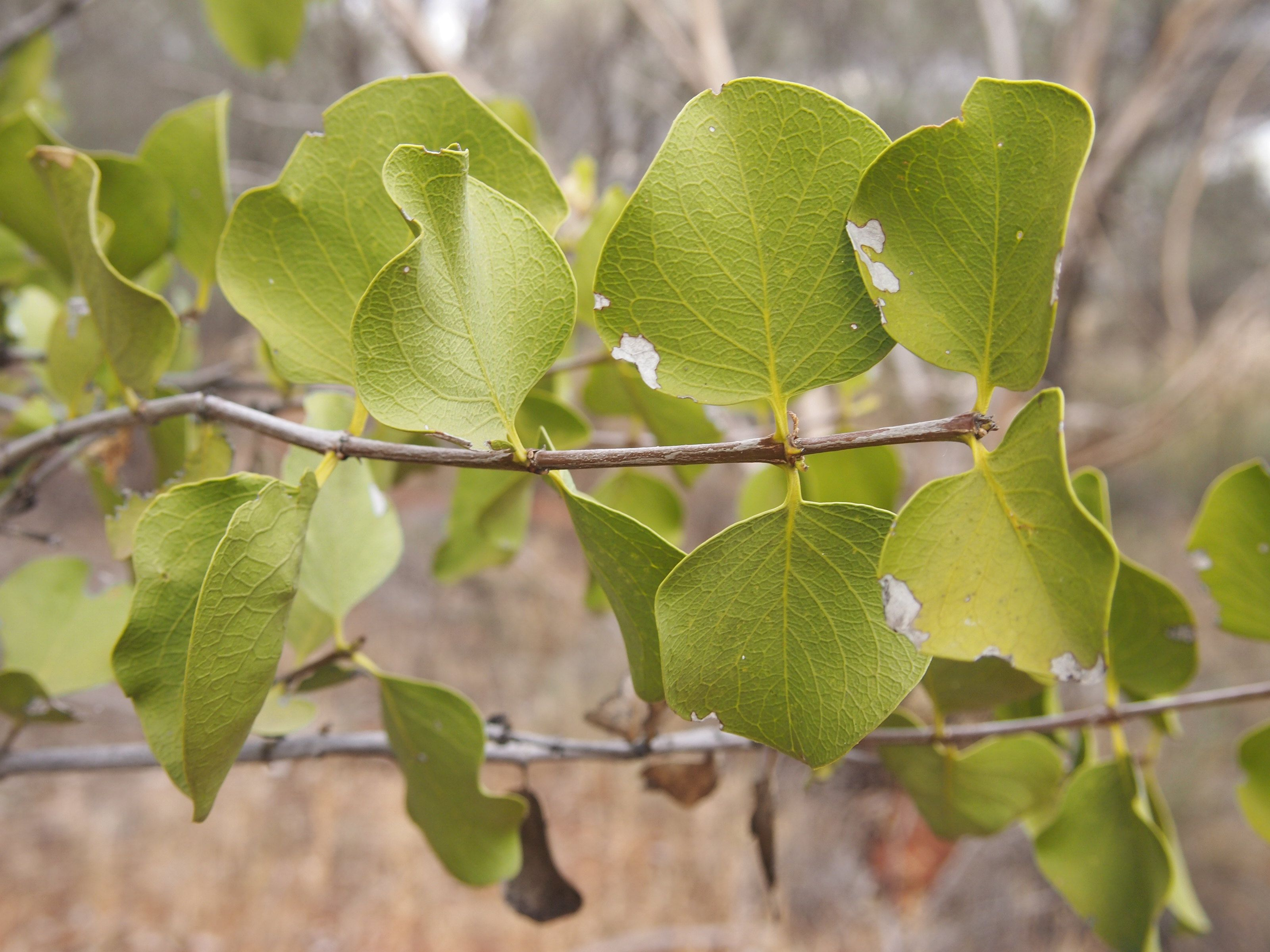
Psydrax latifolius

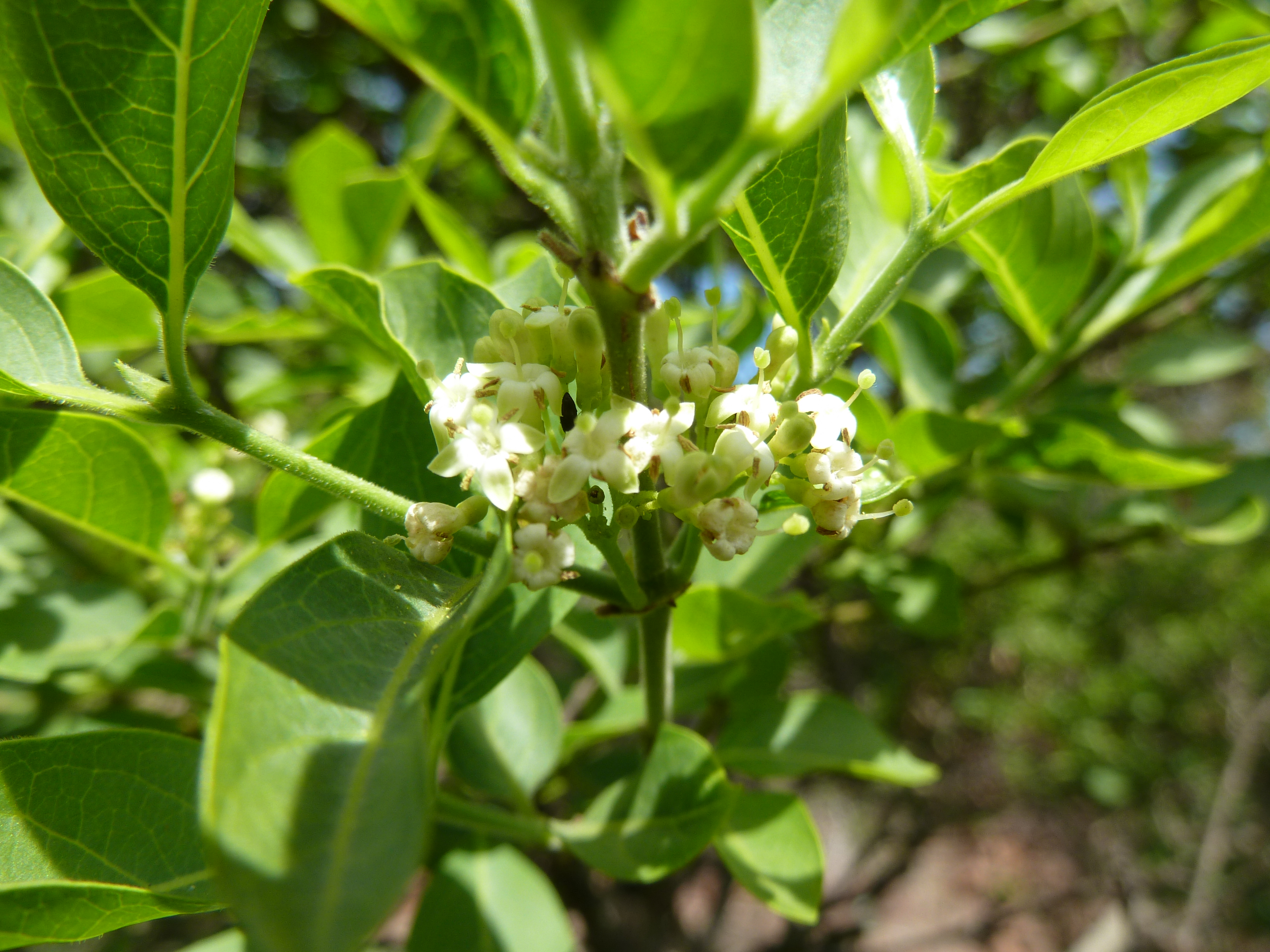
Psydrax lividus

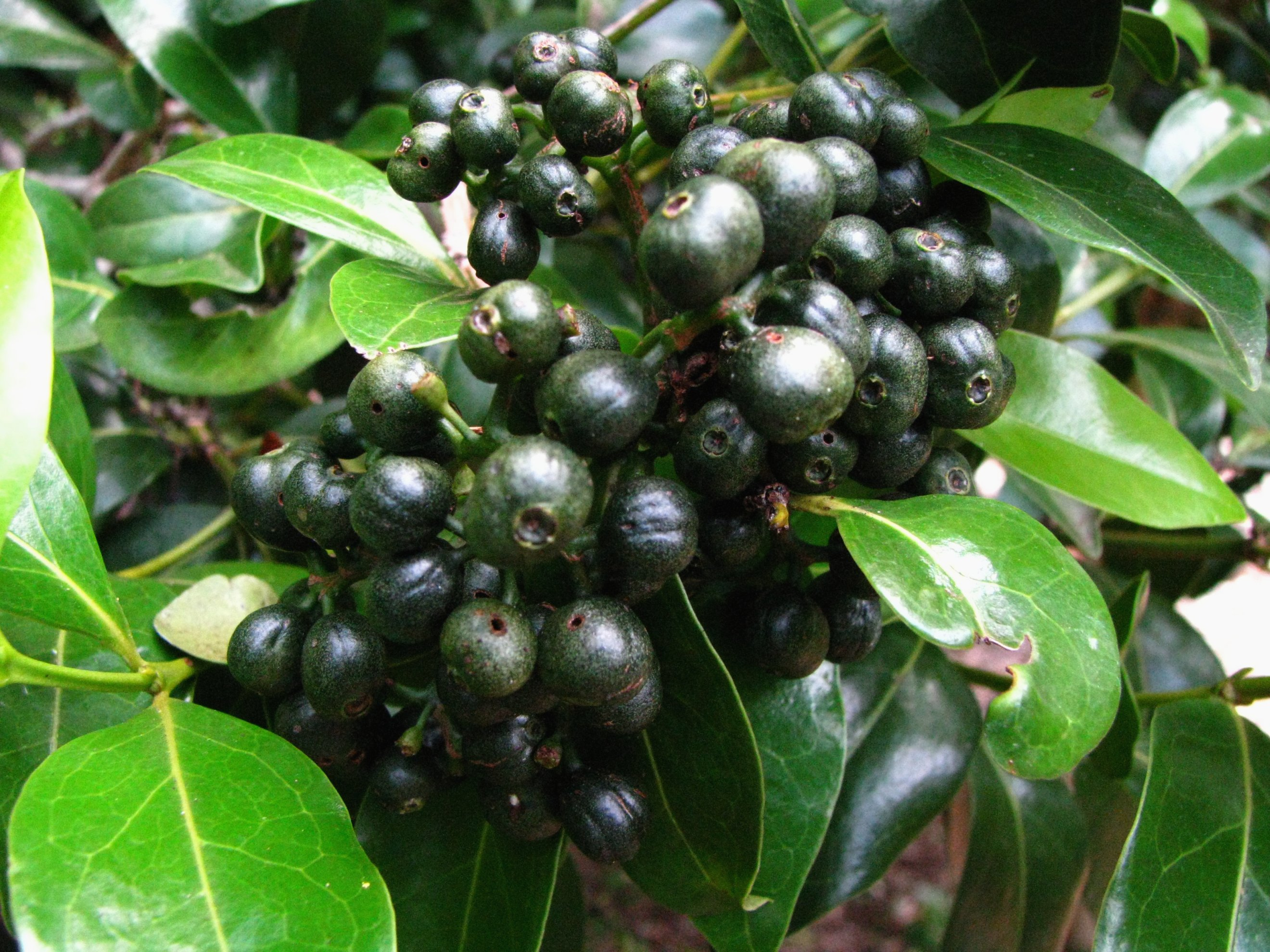
Psydrax odoratus

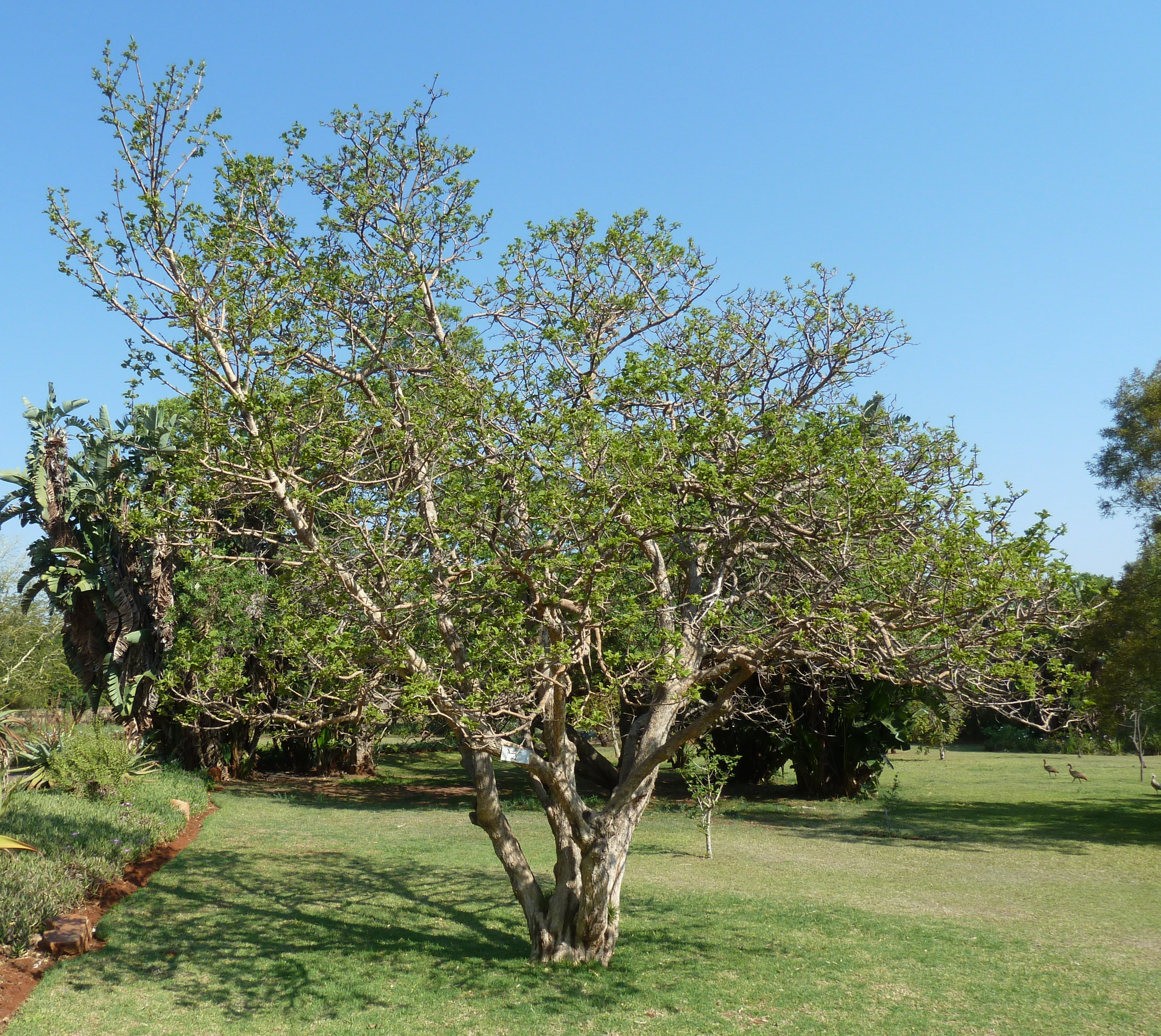
Vangueria infausta

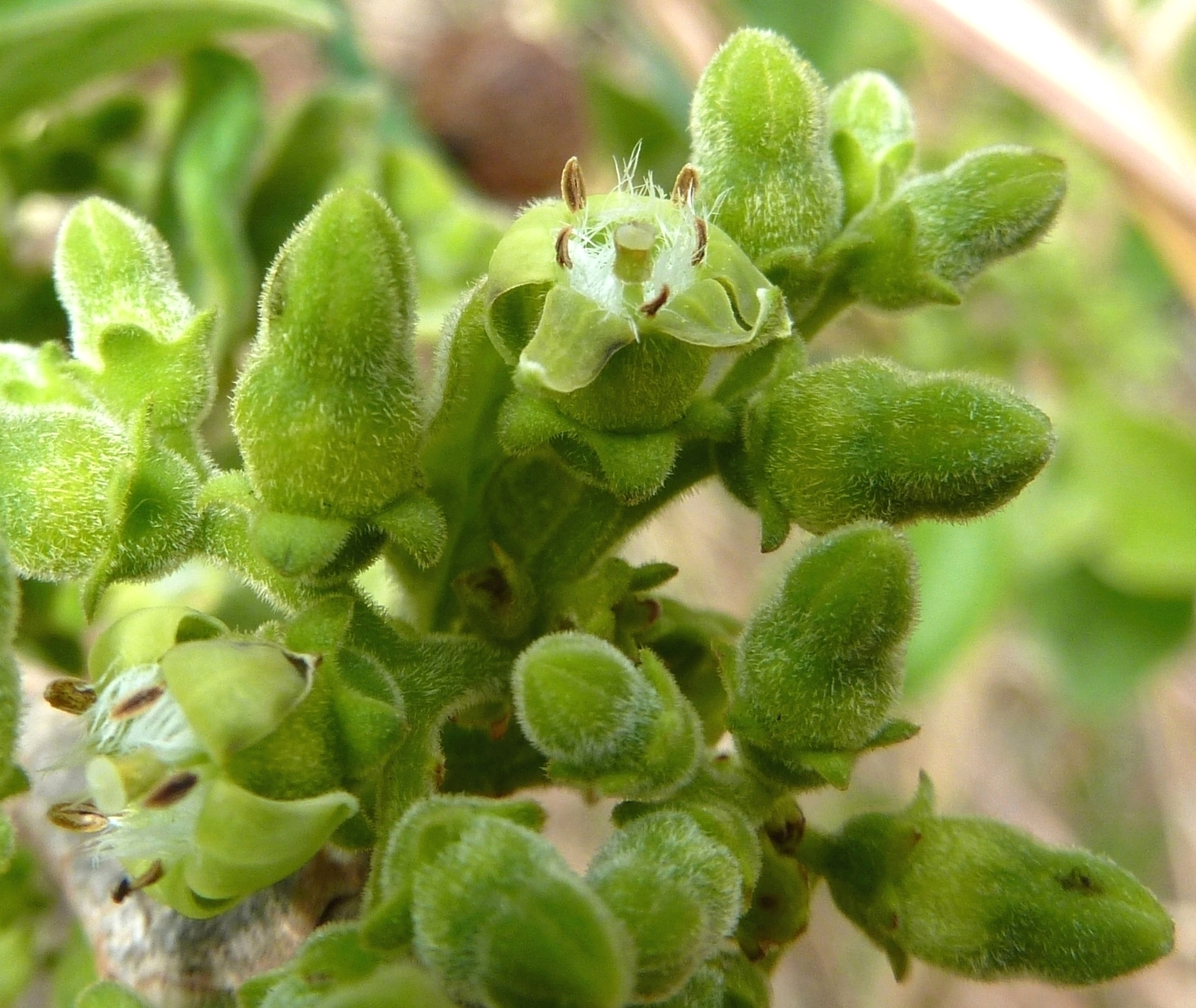
Vangueria infausta

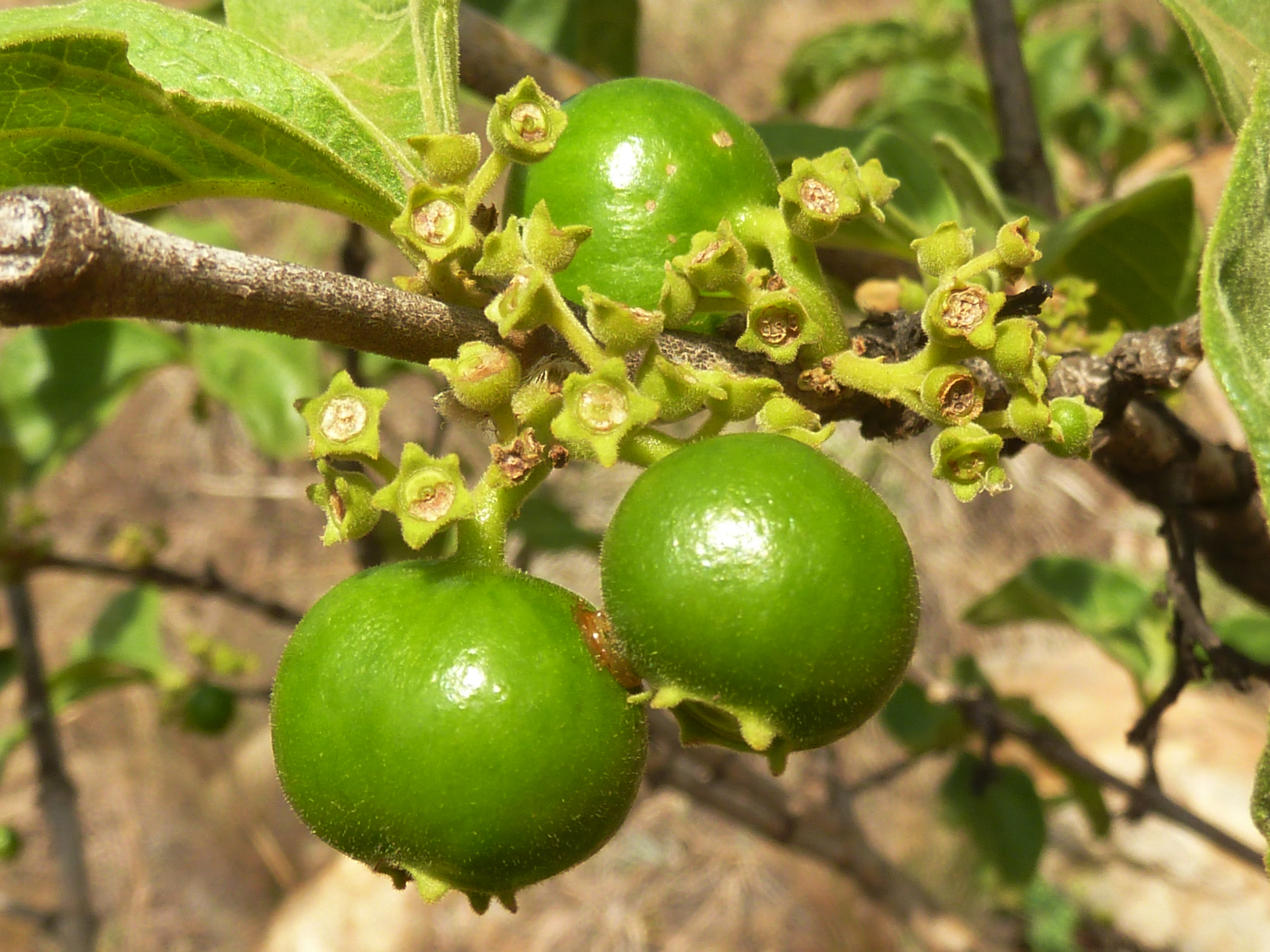
Vangueria infausta

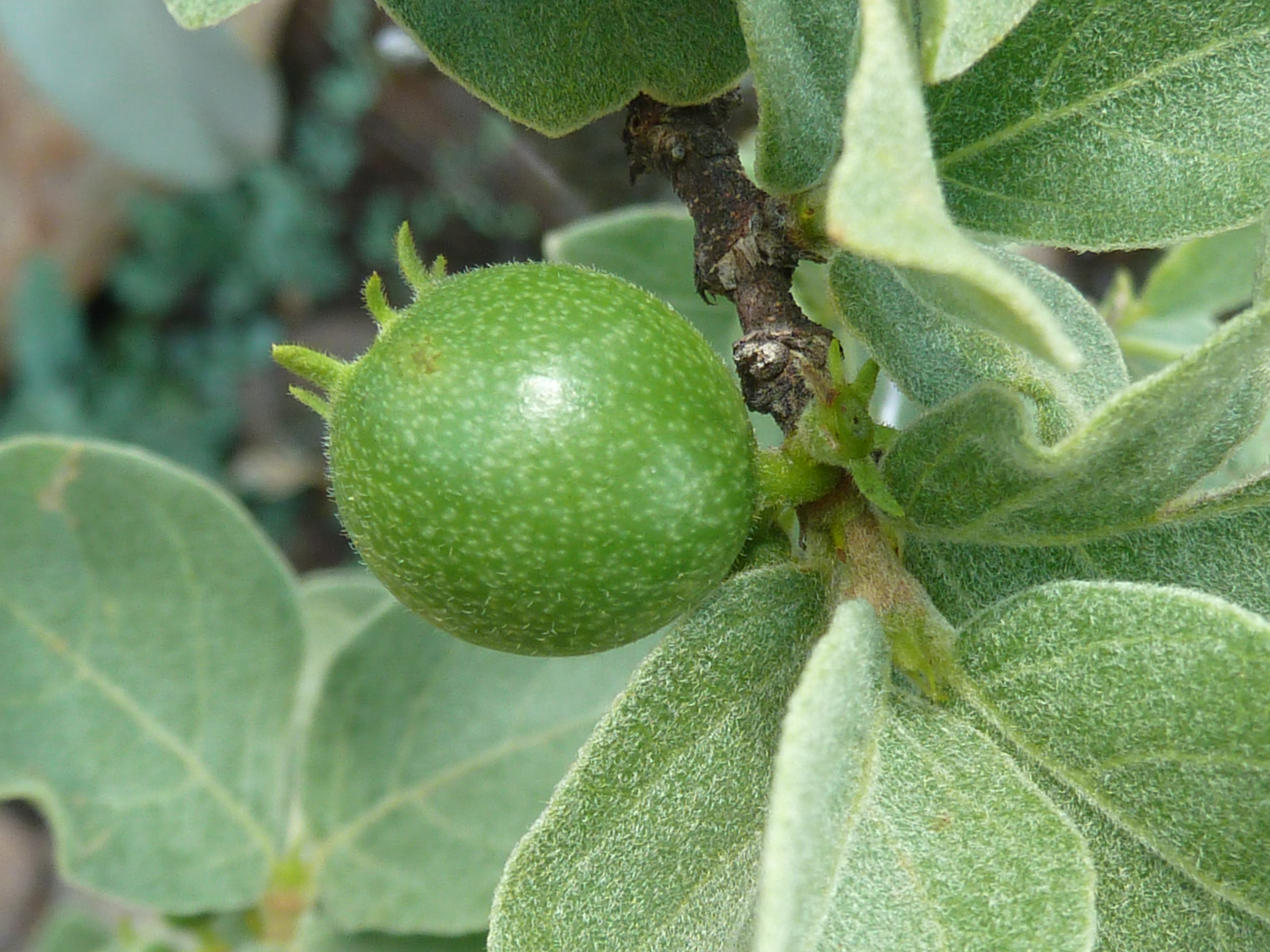
Vangueria parvifolia

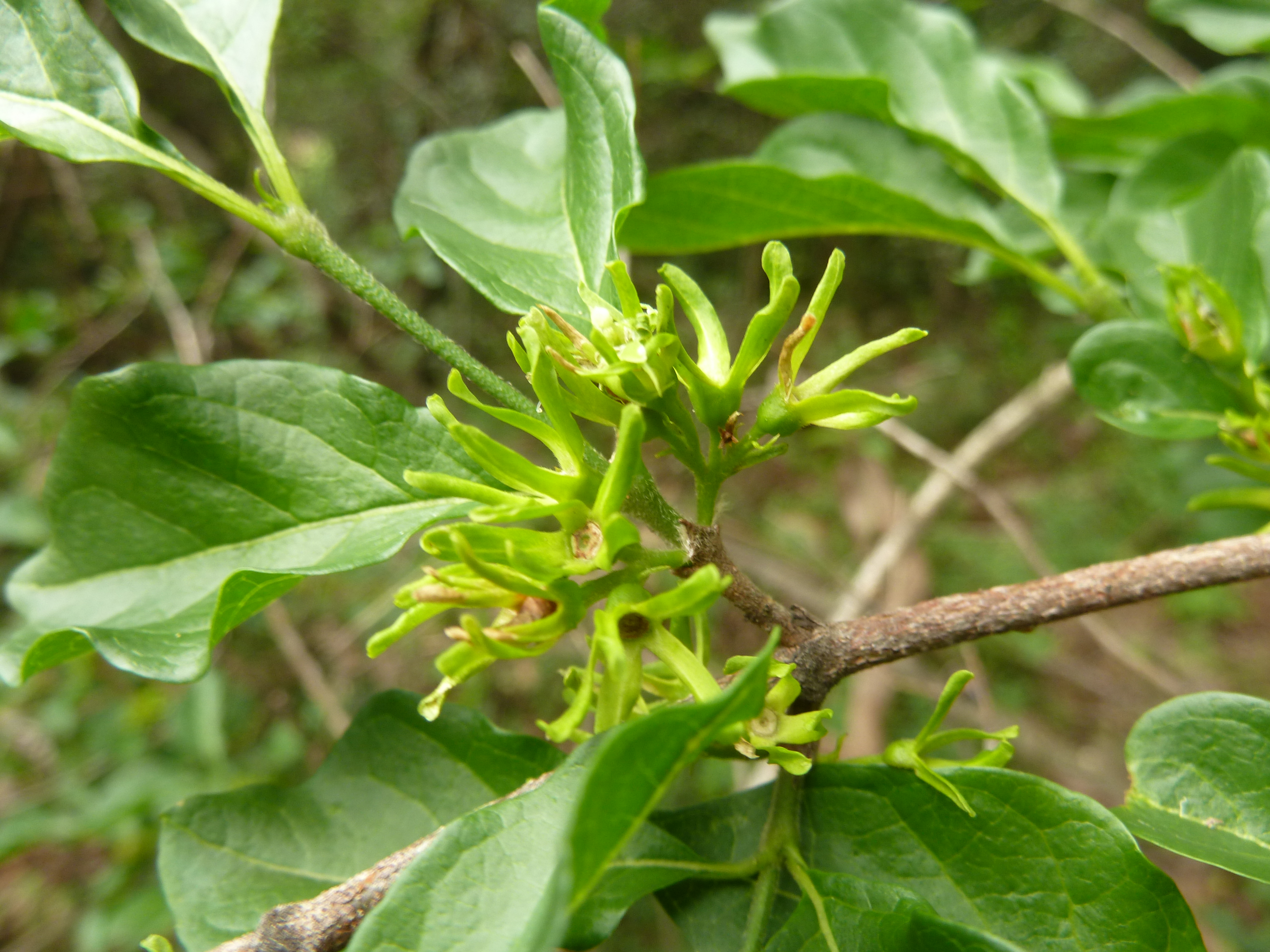
Vangueria macrocalyx
