= Dondisia =

Scientific classification
- Kingdom: Plantae
- Clade: Tracheophytes
- Clade: Angiosperms
- Clade: Eudicots
- Clade: Asterids
- Order: Gentianales
- Family: Rubiaceae
- Subfamily: Dialypetalanthoideae
- Tribe: Vanguerieae
- Genus: Dondisia; DC.

Type species
- Dondisia leschenaultii DC.

Genus of plants

Dondisia was a genus of flowering plants in the family Rubiaceae but is no longer recognized. It has been sunk into synonymy with Canthium. It was originally described by Augustin Pyramus de Candolle in 1830.

== Former species ==
- Dondisia fetida Hassk. = Vangueria madagascariensis var. madagascariensis
- Dondisia foetida Hassk. = Vangueria madagascariensis var. madagascariensis
- Dondisia horrida (Blume) Korth. = Canthium horridum
- Dondisia leschenaultii DC. = Canthium angustifolium
