= Cuviera =

Scientific classification
- Kingdom: Plantae
- Clade: Tracheophytes
- Clade: Angiosperms
- Clade: Eudicots
- Clade: Asterids
- Order: Gentianales
- Family: Rubiaceae
- Subfamily: Dialypetalanthoideae
- Tribe: Vanguerieae
- Genus: Cuviera; DC. 1807, conserved name, not Koeler 1802

Type species
- Cuviera acutiflora DC.

Genus of flowering plants

Cuviera is a genus of flowering plants in the family Rubiaceae native to tropical Africa. It was originally described by Augustin Pyramus de Candolle in 1807 and is named after the French naturalist Georges Cuvier.

== Description ==
The species form a homogeneous group that is well characterized by their striped petals, many-flowered inflorescences and usually ant holes in the twigs. The bracts are recaulescent, which means that the first node of the inflorescence is bare and the lowest bracts are inserted at the second node.

== Distribution and habitat ==
The genus is found in the Guineo-Congolian rainforest zone. The centre of diversity is the Lower Guinean forests; two species occur in the Upper Guinean forests, and only C. angolensis extends into the Congolian forests.

Most species are relatively light demanding, favouring secondary or riverine forest, but some are found in the understory as well. They often grow in clusters.

== Taxonomy ==
At one time, the genus Globulostylis was considered as a subgenus of Cuviera, but it has been re-established as an accepted genus.

== Species ==
Accepted species according to the latest revision.

- Cuviera acutiflora DC. - from Liberia to Equatorial Guinea
- Cuviera angolensis Welw. ex K.Schum. - Zaïre (Congo-Kinshasa or Democratic Republic of Congo), Cabinda, Angola
- Cuviera le-testui Pellegr. - Congo-Brazzaville, Equatorial Guinea, Gabon, Zaïre (Congo-Kinshasa or Democratic Republic of Congo)
- Cuviera longiflora Hiern - Nigeria, Central African Republic, Cameroon, Congo-Brazzaville, Gabon, Bioko
- Cuviera macroura K.Schum. - Benin, Ghana, Guinea, Côte d'Ivoire, Liberia, Nigeria, Sierra Leone, Cameroon
- Cuviera physinodes K.Schum. - Cameroon, Equatorial Guinea, Gabon
- Cuviera pierrei N.Hallé - Equatorial Guinea, Gabon
- Cuviera subuliflora Benth. - Cameroon, Equatorial Guinea, Gabon, Zaïre (Congo-Kinshasa or Democratic Republic of Congo), Congo-Brazzaville, Nigeria, Gulf of Guinea Islands
- Cuviera trilocularis Hiern - Nigeria, Cameroon
- Cuviera truncata Hutch. & Dalziel - Nigeria, Cameroon

formerly included

The following species are excluded from Cuviera based on morphological and molecular data, some of which have not yet been formally transferred to other genera.

- Cuviera australis K.Schum. = Vangueria lasiantha (Sond.) Sond. - Mozambique, South Africa
- Cuviera bolo Aubrèv. & Pellegr. = Robynsia glabrata Hutch. - Ivory Coast, Ghana, Nigeria
- Cuviera calycosa Wernham - Nigeria, Cameroon, Zaïre (Congo-Kinshasa or Democratic Republic of Congo), Congo-Brazzaville
- Cuviera migeodii Verdc. - Tanzania
- Cuviera nigrescens (Elliott ex Oliv.) Wernham - from Liberia to Zaïre (Congo-Kinshasa or Democratic Republic of Congo)
- Cuviera schliebenii Verdc. - Tanzania, Mozambique
- Cuviera semseii Verdc. - Tanzania, Malawi, Mozambique
- Cuviera tomentosa Verdc. - Tanzania, Mozambique
