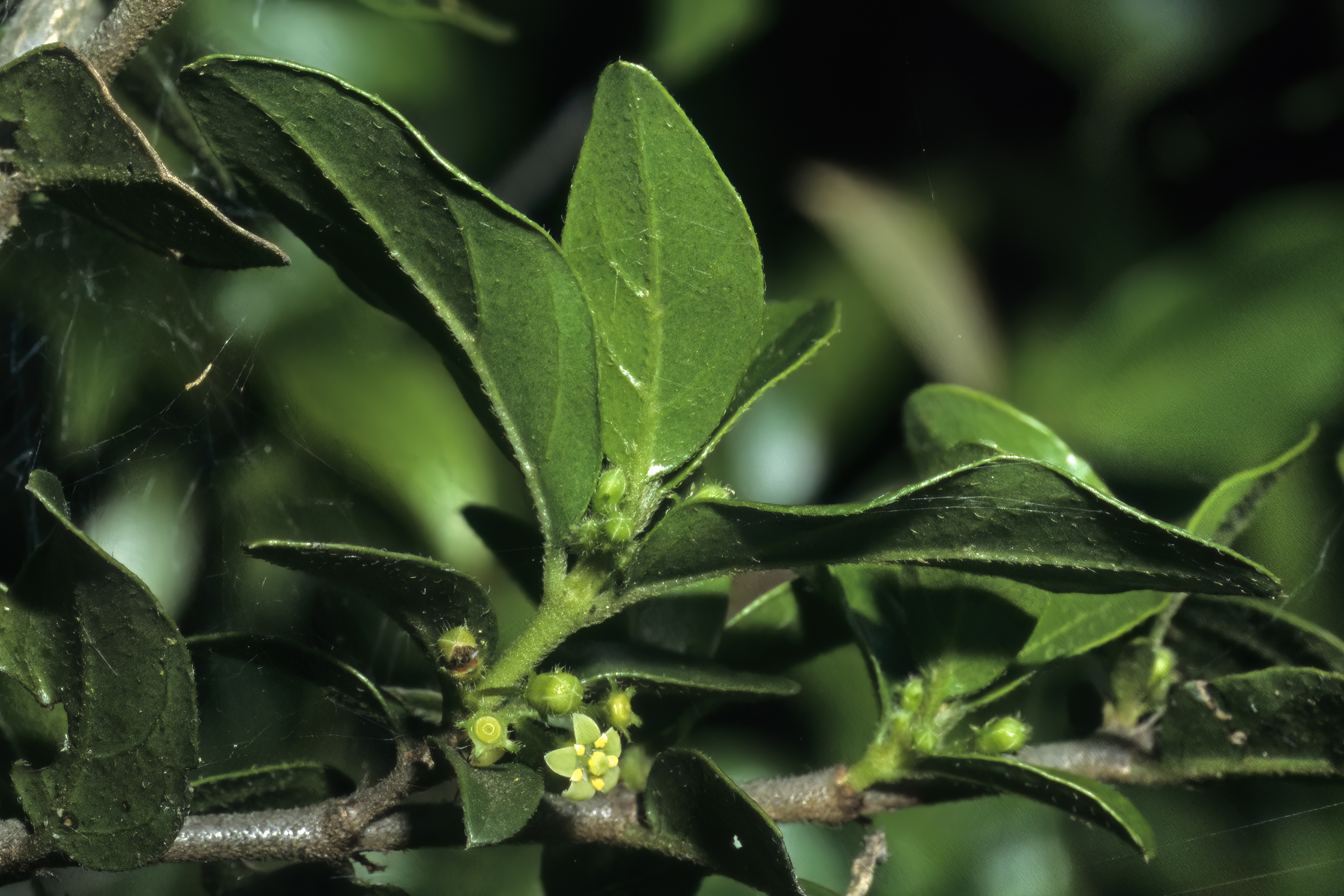
- Bullockia setiflora

Scientific classification
- Kingdom: Plantae
- Clade: Embryophytes
- Clade: Tracheophytes
- Clade: Spermatophytes
- Clade: Angiosperms
- Clade: Eudicots
- Clade: Asterids
- Order: Gentianales
- Family: Rubiaceae
- Subfamily: Dialypetalanthoideae
- Tribe: Vanguerieae
- Genus: Bullockia (Bridson) Razafim., Lantz & B.Bremer

Type species
- Bullockia setiflora (Hiern) Razafim., Lantz & B.Bremer

= Bullockia (plant) =

Genus of flowering plants in the coffee family

Bullockia is a genus of flowering plants in the family Rubiaceae. It was originally described as a subgenus of Canthium. The genus is distributed in eastern and southern Africa from Ethiopia to Transvaal, as well as Madagascar in bushland, woodland, savannas, and dry, deciduous forests.

== Etymology ==
Bullockia is a taxonomic anagram derived from the name of the genus Buckollia. The former name is a taxonomic patronym honoring the English botanist Arthur Allman Bullock.

== Species ==
Additional material has been reported from Madagascar, but at the moment remains undescribed.

- Bullockia dyscriton (Bullock) Razafim., Lantz & B.Bremer - Kenya, Tanzania
- Bullockia fadenii (Bridson) Razafim., Lantz & B.Bremer - Kenya
- Bullockia impressinervia (Bridson) Razafim., Lantz & B.Bremer - Tanzania
- Bullockia mombazensis (Baill.) Razafim., Lantz & B.Bremer - Somalia, Kenya, Tanzania, Mozambique
- Bullockia pseudosetiflora (Bridson) Razafim., Lantz & B.Bremer - Kenya, Tanzania, Ethiopia, Uganda
- Bullockia setiflora (Hiern) Razafim., Lantz & B.Bremer - Kenya, Tanzania, Malawi, Zimbabwe, Eswatini, Natal, Transvaal
