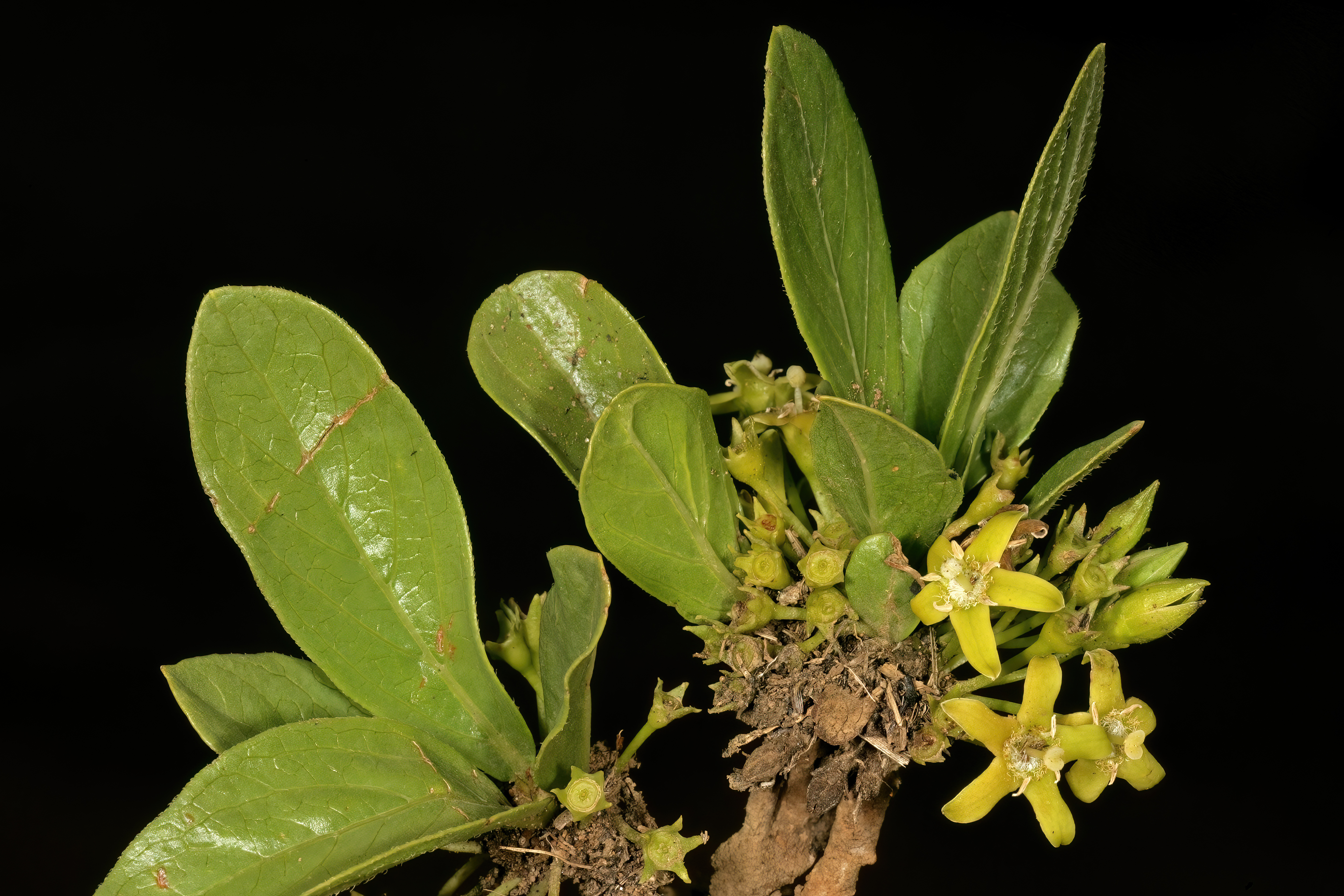

Scientific classification
- Kingdom: Plantae
- Clade: Tracheophytes
- Clade: Angiosperms
- Clade: Eudicots
- Clade: Asterids
- Order: Gentianales
- Family: Rubiaceae
- Subfamily: Dialypetalanthoideae
- Tribe: Vanguerieae
- Genus: Bridsonia; Verstraete & A.E.van Wyk (2018 publ. 2017)
- Species: B. chamaedendrum

Binomial name
- Bridsonia chamaedendrum (Kuntze) Verstraete & A.E.van Wyk (2018 publ. 2017)

Synonyms
- Canthium chamaedendrum Kuntze (1898); Fadogia humilis J.M.Wood & M.S.Evans (1899); Pachystigma humilis (J.M.Wood & M.S.Evans) Bews (1921); Plectronia chamaedendrum Kuntze (1898); Pygmaeothamnus chamaedendrum (Kuntze) Robyns (1928); Pygmaeothamnus chamaedendrum var. setulosus Robyns (1928); Pygmaeothamnus longipes Robyns (1928); Pygmaeothamnus pilosus Robyns (1928)

= Bridsonia =

Species of plant

Bridsonia chamaedendrum, more commonly known as the pygmy sand apple, is a species of plant in the family Rubiaceae. It is the sole species in genus Bridsonia. It is a perennial or subshrub native to South Africa, and Eswatini.
