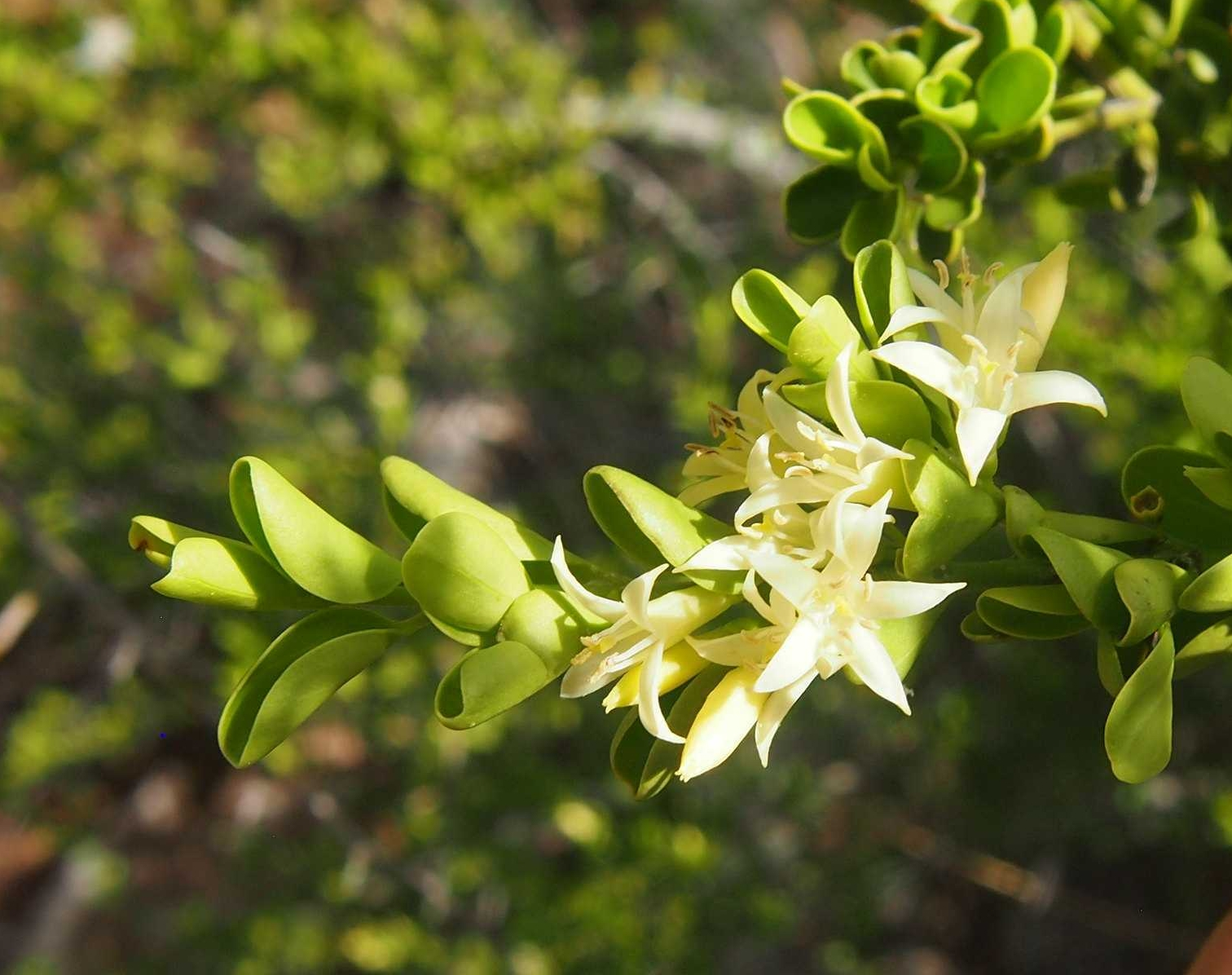

Scientific classification
- Kingdom: Plantae
- Clade: Tracheophytes
- Clade: Angiosperms
- Clade: Eudicots
- Clade: Asterids
- Order: Gentianales
- Family: Rubiaceae
- Subfamily: Dialypetalanthoideae
- Tribe: Vanguerieae
- Genus: Everistia; S.T.Reynolds & R.J.F.Hend.
- Species: E. vacciniifolia

Binomial name
- Everistia vacciniifolia (F.Muell.) S.T.Reynolds & R.J.F.Hend.

Synonyms
- Canthium vacciniifolium F.Muell.

= Everistia =

Genus of plants

Everistia was a genus of flowering plants in the family Rubiaceae but is no longer recognized. It has been sunk into synonymy with Psydrax. The sole species Everistia vacciniifolia (now Psydrax vacciniifolius) grows naturally only (endemic) from north-eastern New South Wales to north Queensland, Australia.

== Image gallery ==
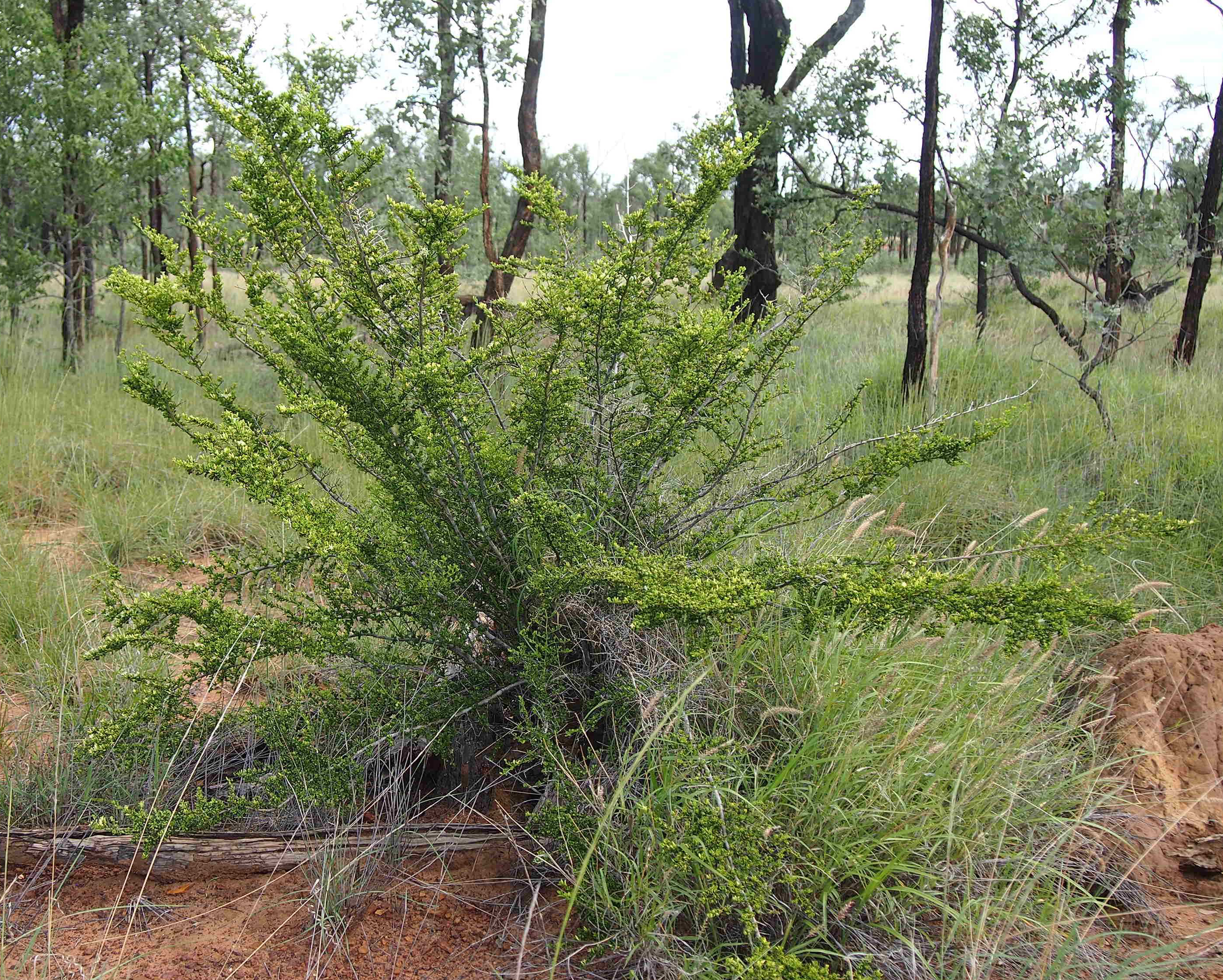

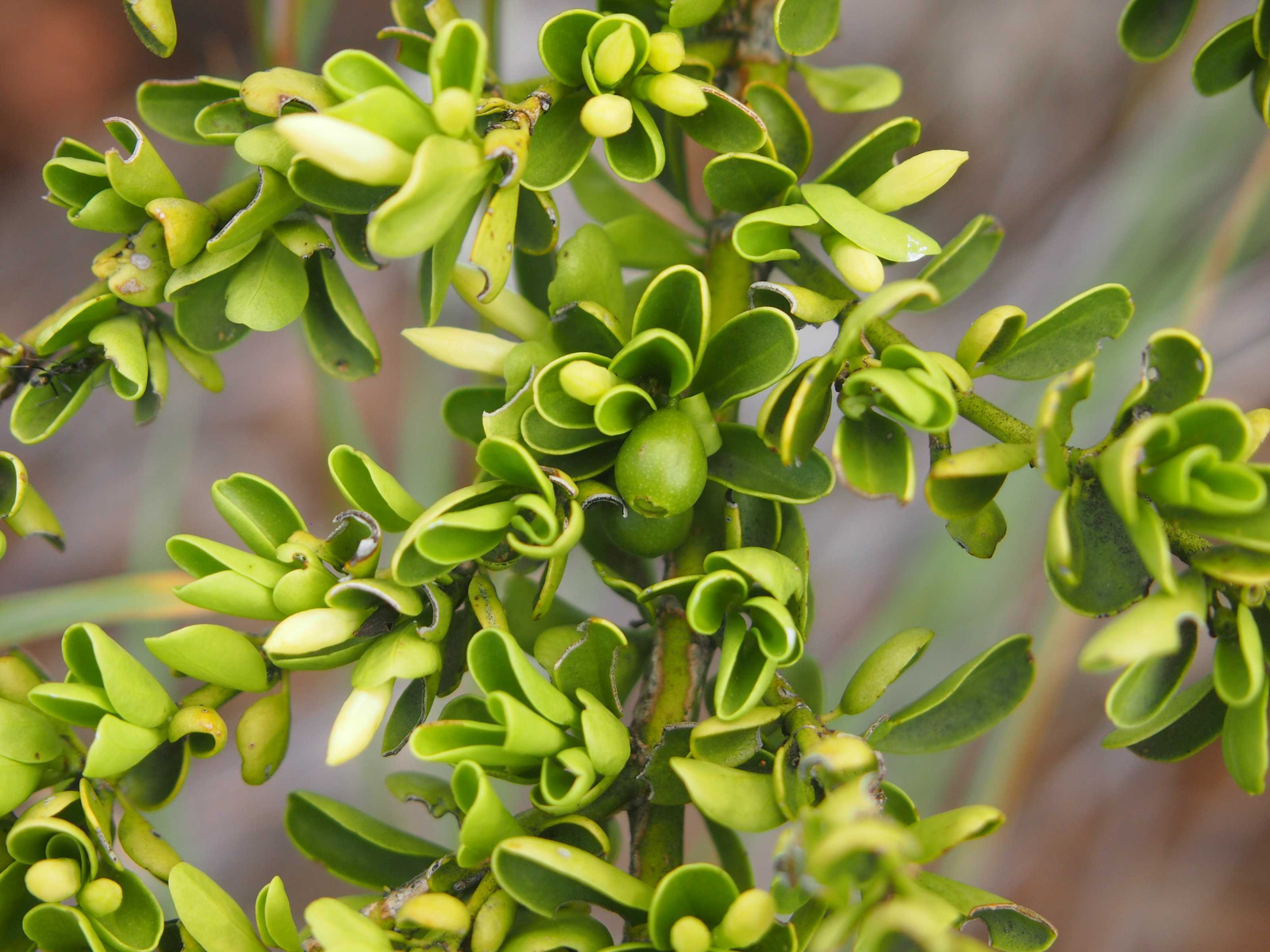
