= Peponidium =

Scientific classification
- Kingdom: Plantae
- Clade: Tracheophytes
- Clade: Angiosperms
- Clade: Eudicots
- Clade: Asterids
- Order: Gentianales
- Family: Rubiaceae
- Subfamily: Dialypetalanthoideae
- Tribe: Vanguerieae
- Genus: Peponidium (Baill.) Arènes

Genus of plants

Peponidium is a genus of flowering plants in the family Rubiaceae. The genus is endemic to Madagascar, except for Peponidium ovato-oblongum and Peponidium venulosum that are found on the Comoros, and Peponidium carinatum and Peponidium celastroides that are found on the Seychelles.

== Species ==
- Peponidium alleizettei (Dubard & Dop) Razafim., Lantz & B.Bremer
- Peponidium ankaranense (Arènes ex Cavaco) Razafim., Lantz & B.Bremer
- Peponidium anoveanum (Cavaco) Razafim., Lantz & B.Bremer
- Peponidium arenesianum (Cavaco) Razafim., Lantz & B.Bremer
- Peponidium bakerianum (Drake) Kainulainen & Razafim.
- Peponidium blepharodon (Arènes ex Cavaco) Razafim., Lantz & B.Bremer
- Peponidium boinense (Arènes ex Cavaco) Razafim., Lantz & B.Bremer
- Peponidium boivinianum (Baker) A.P.Davis & Razafim.
- Peponidium bosseri (Cavaco) Razafim., Lantz & B.Bremer
- Peponidium buxifolium (Baker) Razafim., Lantz & B.Bremer
- Peponidium calcaratum Homolle ex Arènes
- Peponidium capuronii Cavaco
- Peponidium carinatum (Baker) Kainulainen & Razafim.
- Peponidium celastroides (Baker) Kainulainen & Razafim.
- Peponidium crassifolium Lantz, Klack. & Razafim.
- Peponidium cuspidatum Arènes
- Peponidium cystiporon (Cavaco) Razafim., Lantz & B.Bremer
- Peponidium decaryi (Homolle ex Cavaco) Razafim., Lantz & B.Bremer
- Peponidium densiflorum (Baker) A.P.Davis & Razafim.
- Peponidium flavum Homolle ex Arènes
- Peponidium homolleae Arènes
- Peponidium homolleanum (Cavaco) Kainulainen & Razafim.
- Peponidium horridum Arènes
- Peponidium humbertianum (Cavaco) Razafim., Lantz & B.Bremer
- Peponidium humbertii Homolle ex Arènes
- Peponidium ihosyense Arènes
- Peponidium lanceolatifolium Cavaco
- Peponidium latiflorum (Homolle ex Cavaco) Razafim., Lantz & B.Bremer
- Peponidium madagascariense Cavaco
- Peponidium marojejyense (Cavaco) Razafim., Lantz & B.Bremer
- Peponidium micranthum (Baker) A.P.Davis & Razafim.
- Peponidium occidentale Homolle ex Arènes
- Peponidium orientale (Arènes) Cavaco
- Peponidium ovato-oblongum (K.Schum.) Mouly
- Peponidium pallens (Baill.) Arènes
- Peponidium pallidum Arènes
- Peponidium parvifolium Arènes
- Peponidium perrieri Arènes
- Peponidium pervilleanoides Arènes
- Peponidium pervilleanum (Baill.) Homolle ex Arènes
- Peponidium sahafaryense (Cavaco) Razafim., Lantz & B.Bremer
- Peponidium sakalavense Razafim., Lantz & B.Bremer
- Peponidium subevenium (K.Schum.) Razafim., Lantz & B.Bremer
- Peponidium tamatavense (Cavaco) Razafim., Lantz & B.Bremer
- Peponidium tsaratananense Arènes
- Peponidium velutinum Arènes
- Peponidium venulosum (Boivin ex Baill.) Razafim., Lantz & B.Bremer
- Peponidium viguieri (Homolle ex Cavaco) Razafim., Lantz & B.Bremer
