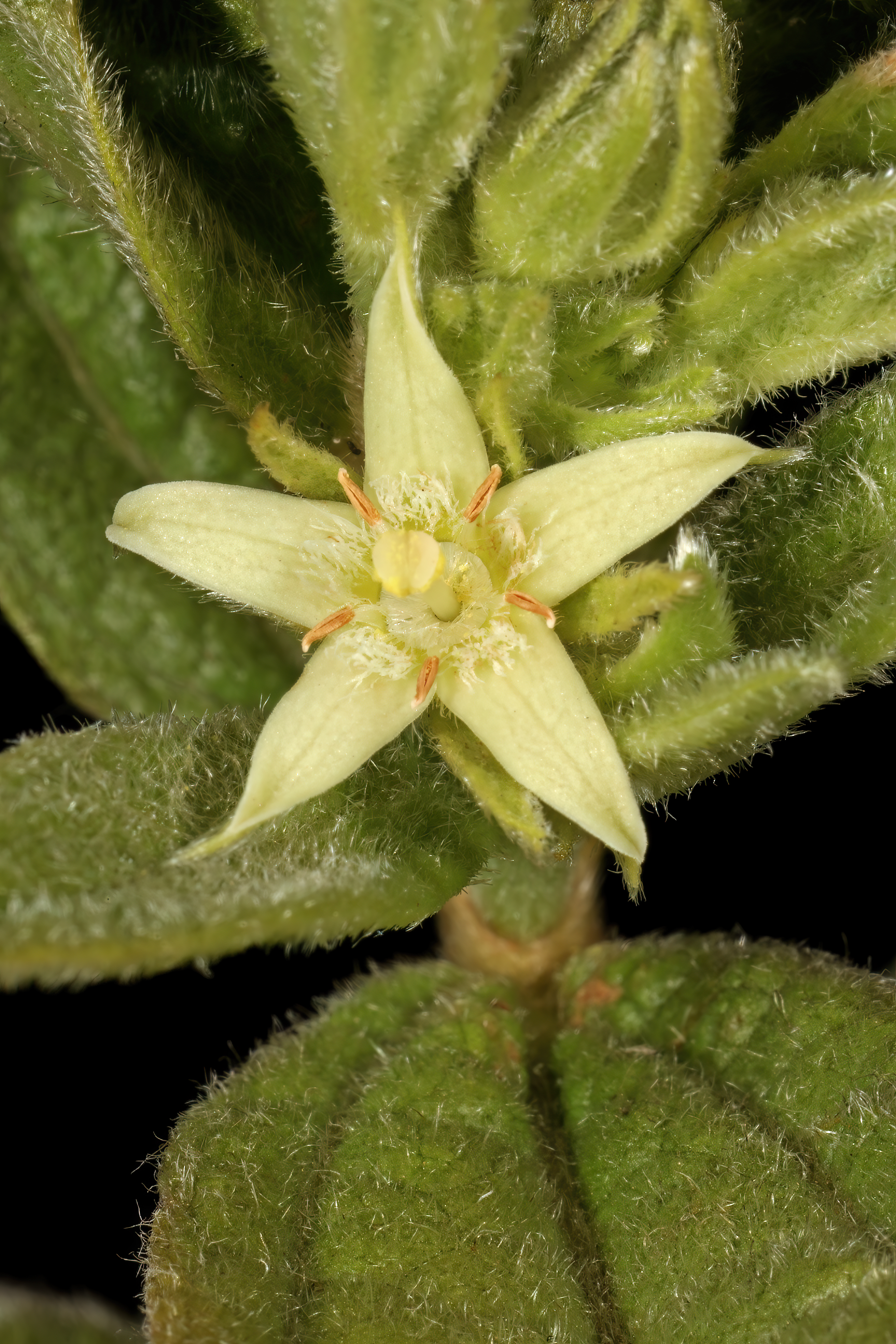

Conservation status
- Vulnerable (IUCN 2.3)

Scientific classification
- Kingdom: Plantae
- Clade: Tracheophytes
- Clade: Angiosperms
- Clade: Eudicots
- Clade: Asterids
- Order: Gentianales
- Family: Rubiaceae
- Subfamily: Dialypetalanthoideae
- Tribe: Vanguerieae
- Genus: Eriosemopsis; Robyns
- Species: E. subanisophylla

Binomial name
- Eriosemopsis subanisophylla Robyns

= Eriosemopsis =

Plant genus

Eriosemopsis is a monotypic genus of flowering plants in the family Rubiaceae. It was described by Walter Robyns in 1928 and no changes have been made since then. The genus contains only one species, viz. Eriosemopsis subanisophylla, which is native to southeastern Eastern Cape and southern KwaZulu-Natal provinces of South Africa. The species is morphologically similar to the species Pygmaeothamnus zeyheri but differs by having a thick indumentum, raised venation and elliptical leaves.
