= Pseudopeponidium =

Scientific classification
- Kingdom: Plantae
- Clade: Tracheophytes
- Clade: Angiosperms
- Clade: Eudicots
- Clade: Asterids
- Order: Gentianales
- Family: Rubiaceae
- Subfamily: Dialypetalanthoideae
- Tribe: Vanguerieae
- Genus: Pseudopeponidium; Homolle ex Arènes

Genus of plants

Pseudopeponidium was a genus of flowering plants in the family Rubiaceae but is no longer recognized. It was sunk into synonymy with Pyrostria.
