= Fadogiella =

Scientific classification
- Kingdom: Plantae
- Clade: Tracheophytes
- Clade: Angiosperms
- Clade: Eudicots
- Clade: Asterids
- Order: Gentianales
- Family: Rubiaceae
- Subfamily: Dialypetalanthoideae
- Tribe: Vanguerieae
- Genus: Fadogiella; Robyns

Genus of plants

Fadogiella is a small genus of flowering plants in the family Rubiaceae. It was described by Walter Robyns in 1928.

== Distribution ==
It is found in Central and East Tropical Africa: Democratic Republic of the Congo, Tanzania, Angola, Malawi, and Zambia.

== Bacterial leaf symbiosis ==
Endophytic bacteria are housed in the intercellular space of the leaf mesophyll tissue. The presence of these bacteria can only be microscopically ascertained. The bacteria are identified as Burkholderia, which is a genus that is also found in the leaves of other Rubiaceae species. The hypothesis is that these endophytic bacteria provide chemical protection against insect herbivory.

== Taxonomy ==
This genus is morphologically similar to and related to Fadogia, but Fadogiella is (3-)4-5 locular, while Fadogia is 3-4(-5) locular.

== Species ==
- Fadogiella cana (K.Schum.) Robyns
- Fadogiella rogersii (Wernham) Bridson
- Fadogiella stigmatoloba (K.Schum.) Robyns
