= Dibridsonia =

Scientific classification
- Kingdom: Plantae
- Clade: Embryophytes
- Clade: Tracheophytes
- Clade: Angiosperms
- Clade: Eudicots
- Clade: Asterids
- Order: Gentianales
- Family: Rubiaceae
- Tribe: Vanguerieae
- Genus: Dibridsonia; K.M.Wong

Genus of flowering plants

Dibridsonia is a genus of flowering plants belonging to the family Rubiaceae.

Its native range is Thailand to Western and Central Malesia.

Species:

- Dibridsonia conferta (Korth.) K.M.Wong
- Dibridsonia culionensis (Elmer) K.M.Wong
- Dibridsonia oblongifolia (Quisumb. & Merr.) K.M.Wong
