= Rhopalobrachium =

Scientific classification
- Kingdom: Plantae
- Clade: Tracheophytes
- Clade: Angiosperms
- Clade: Eudicots
- Clade: Asterids
- Order: Gentianales
- Family: Rubiaceae
- Subfamily: Dialypetalanthoideae
- Tribe: Vanguerieae
- Genus: Rhopalobrachium; Schltr. & K.Krause

Genus of plants

Rhopalobrachium was a genus of flowering plants in the family Rubiaceae but is no longer recognized. It has been sunk into synonymy with Cyclophyllum. It was originally described by Rudolf Schlechter and Kurt Krause in 1908 to accommodate two New Caledonian species, R. congestum and R. fragrans. No type species was selected.

== Former species ==
- Rhopalobrachium congestum Schltr. & K.Krause = Aidia congesta
- Rhopalobrachium fragrans Schltr. & K.Krause = Cyclophyllum fragrans
- Rhopalobrachium megacarpum (Kaneh.) Kaneh. = Atractocarpus carolinensis
