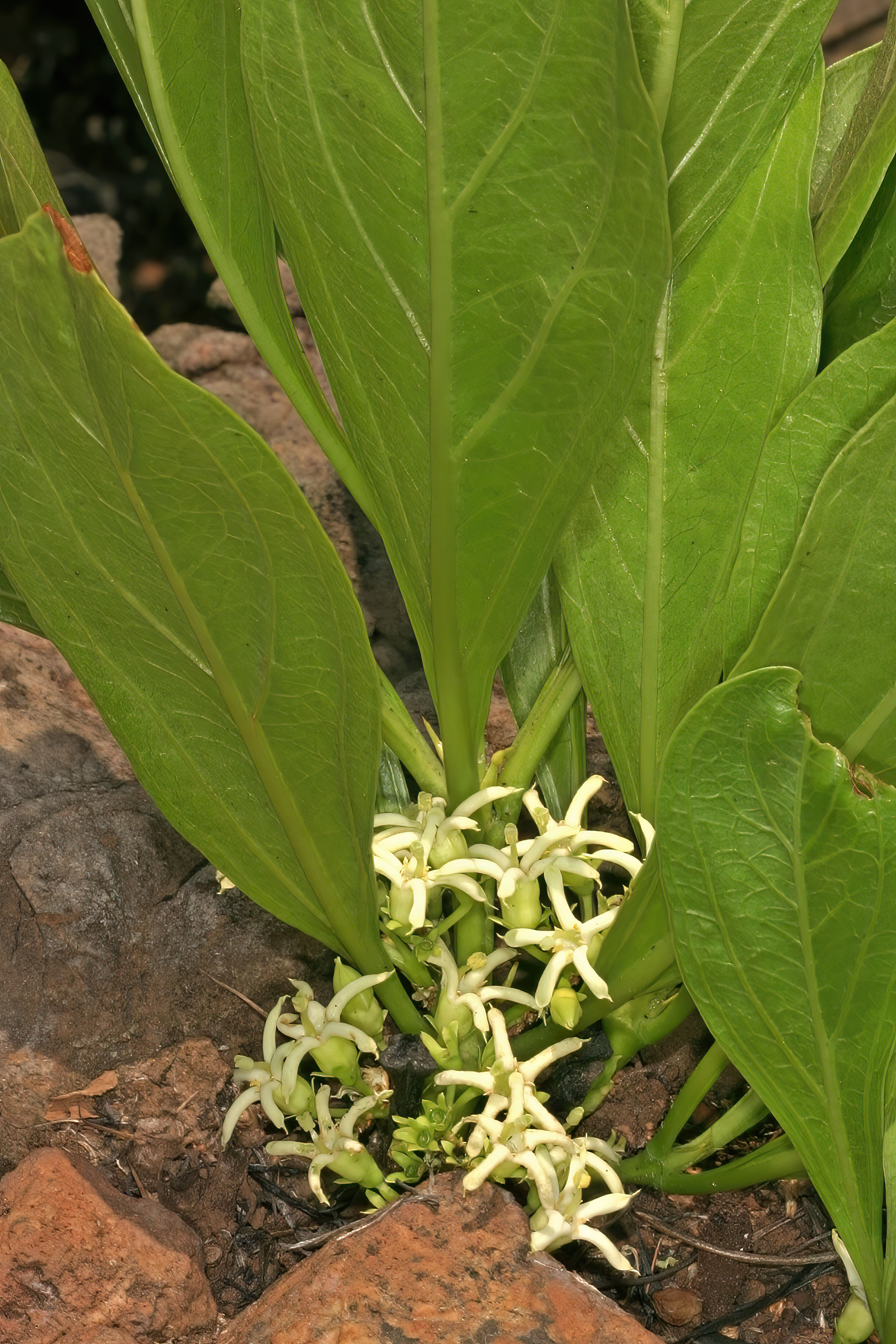

Scientific classification
- Kingdom: Plantae
- Clade: Tracheophytes
- Clade: Angiosperms
- Clade: Eudicots
- Clade: Asterids
- Order: Gentianales
- Family: Rubiaceae
- Subfamily: Dialypetalanthoideae
- Tribe: Vanguerieae
- Genus: Pygmaeothamnus; Robyns

Type species
- Pygmaeothamnus zeyheri (Sond.) Robyns

= Pygmaeothamnus =

Genus of flowering plants

Pygmaeothamnus is a monotypic genus of flowering plants in the family Rubiaceae. It was described by Walter Robyns in 1928 and originally held four species. It is found in central and southern Africa.

== Species ==
- Pygmaeothamnus zeyheri (Sond.) Robyns
