= Temnocalyx =

Scientific classification
- Kingdom: Plantae
- Clade: Tracheophytes
- Clade: Angiosperms
- Clade: Eudicots
- Clade: Asterids
- Order: Gentianales
- Family: Rubiaceae
- Subfamily: Dialypetalanthoideae
- Tribe: Vanguerieae
- Genus: Temnocalyx; Robyns
- Species: T. nodulosa

Binomial name
- Temnocalyx nodulosa Robyns

Genus of plants

Temnocalyx is a monotypic genus of flowering plants in the family Rubiaceae. It was originally described by Walter Robyns in 1928 and contained five species. Since then most of these species have been made synonym and currently only one species name remains valid, i.e. Temnocalyx nodulosa. The species is endemic to southwestern Tanzania.
