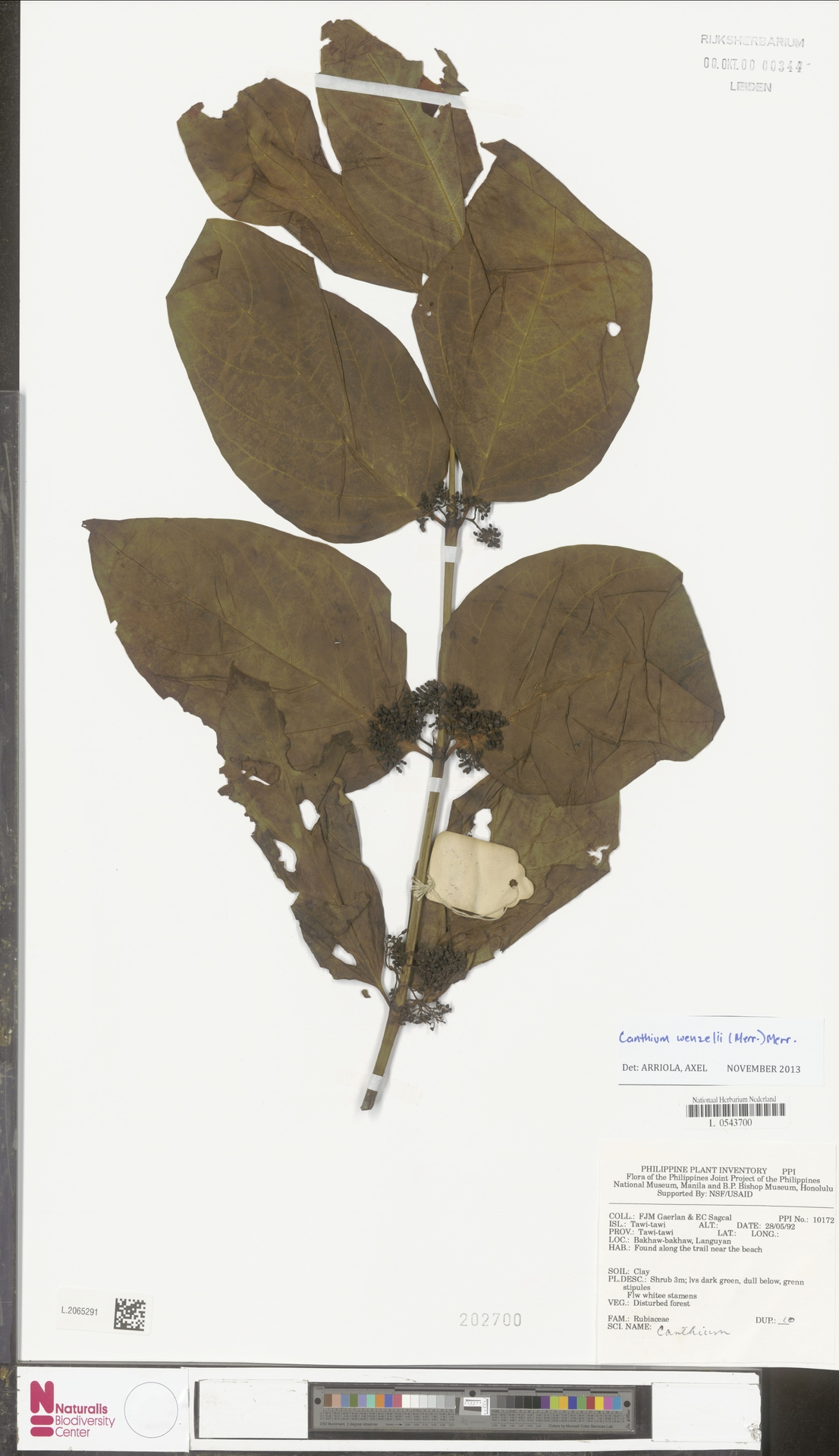

Scientific classification
- Kingdom: Plantae
- Clade: Tracheophytes
- Clade: Angiosperms
- Clade: Eudicots
- Clade: Asterids
- Order: Gentianales
- Family: Rubiaceae
- Subfamily: Dialypetalanthoideae
- Tribe: Vanguerieae
- Genus: Kanapia; Arriola & Alejandro

Type species
- Kanapia monstrosa (A.Rich.) Arriola & Alejandro

= Kanapia =

Genus of plants

Kanapia is a genus of flowering plants in the family Rubiaceae. The genus is endemic to the Philippines. It was described when two former Canthium species were transferred to this new genus.

== Species ==
- Kanapia monstrosa (A.Rich.) Arriola & Alejandro
- Kanapia wenzelii (Merr.) Arriola, Paraguison & Alejandro
