= Perakanthus =

Scientific classification
- Kingdom: Plantae
- Clade: Tracheophytes
- Clade: Angiosperms
- Clade: Eudicots
- Clade: Asterids
- Order: Gentianales
- Family: Rubiaceae
- Subfamily: Dialypetalanthoideae
- Tribe: Vanguerieae
- Genus: Perakanthus; Robyns ex Ridl.
- Species: P. velutinus

Binomial name
- Perakanthus velutinus (Ridl.) Robyns ex Ridl.

Genus of plants

Perakanthus is a monotypic genus of flowering plants in the family Rubiaceae. The sole species is Perakanthus velutinus, which is endemic to Peninsular Malaysia.
