= Robynsia =

Conservation status
- Vulnerable (IUCN 2.3)

Scientific classification
- Kingdom: Plantae
- Clade: Tracheophytes
- Clade: Angiosperms
- Clade: Eudicots
- Clade: Asterids
- Order: Gentianales
- Family: Rubiaceae
- Subfamily: Dialypetalanthoideae
- Tribe: Vanguerieae
- Genus: Robynsia; Hutch.
- Species: R. glabrata

Binomial name
- Robynsia glabrata Hutch.

Synonyms
- Cuviera bolo Aubrév. & Pellegr

Genus of plants

Robynsia is a monotypic genus of flowering plants in the family Rubiaceae. It was described by John Hutchinson and was named after his friend and colleague Walter Robyns. The genus contains only one species, Robynsia glabrata, which is found in Ghana, Ivory Coast and Nigeria. The species is morphologically similar to the genus Cuviera but differs by having long, slender corolla tubes.
