= Globulostylis =

Scientific classification
- Kingdom: Plantae
- Clade: Tracheophytes
- Clade: Angiosperms
- Clade: Eudicots
- Clade: Asterids
- Order: Gentianales
- Family: Rubiaceae
- Subfamily: Dialypetalanthoideae
- Tribe: Vanguerieae
- Genus: Globulostylis; Wernham

Type species
- Globulostylis talbotii Wernham

Genus of flowering plants

Globulostylis is a genus of flowering plants in the family Rubiaceae. It comprises 8 species growing in Central Africa.

== Description ==
The main characters of Globulostylis are the few-flowered inflorescences with a pair of bracts at the apex of the peduncle and the style with a swelling in the lower half.

== Distribution and habitat ==
Globulostylis has 8 species in Central Africa, all endemic to the Lower Guinean forests, except G. uncinula, which also occurs in the Congolian forests.

All species are shrubs or small trees of forest understory, never gregarious.

== Bacterial leaf symbiosis ==
Endophytic bacteria are housed in the intercellular space of the leaf mesophyll tissue. The presence of these bacteria can only be microscopically ascertained. The bacteria are identified as Burkholderia, which is a genus that is also found in the leaves of other Rubiaceae species. hypothesis is that these endophytic bacteria provide chemical protection against insect herbivory.

== Taxonomy ==
The genus was described by H.F. Wernham in 1913 to accommodate two species from South Nigeria collected by Mr. and Mrs. P.A. Talbot, viz. G. minor and G. talbotii. A third species, G. cuvieroides, was added later. Globulostylis and Cuviera species are closely related, and therefore at one point Globulostylis was treated as a subgenus of Cuviera. However, the combined analysis of both morphological and molecular data separates both genera.

== Species ==
Accepted species according to the latest revision.

- Globulostylis cuvieroides Wernham
- Globulostylis dewildeana Sonké, O.Lachenaud & Dessein
- Globulostylis leniochlamys (K.Schum.) Sonké, O.Lachenaud & Dessein
- Globulostylis minor Wernham
- Globulostylis rammelooana Sonké, O.Lachenaud & Dessein
- Globulostylis robbrechtiana Sonké, O.Lachenaud, Dessein & De Block
- Globulostylis talbotii Wernham
- Globulostylis uncinula (N.Hallé) Sonké, O.Lachenaud & Dessein
