= Canthiumera =

Scientific classification
- Kingdom: Plantae
- Clade: Tracheophytes
- Clade: Angiosperms
- Clade: Eudicots
- Clade: Asterids
- Order: Gentianales
- Family: Rubiaceae
- Genus: Canthiumera; K.M.Wong & Mahyuni

Genus of plants

Canthiumera is a genus of flowering plants belonging to the family Rubiaceae.

Its native range is Indian subcontinent to Western and Southern Malesia.

Species:

- Canthiumera glabra (Blume) K.M.Wong & Mahyuni
- Canthiumera neilgherrensis (Wight) K.M.Wong
- Canthiumera robusta K.M.Wong & X.Y.Ng
- Canthiumera siamensis (K.Schum.) K.M.Wong
