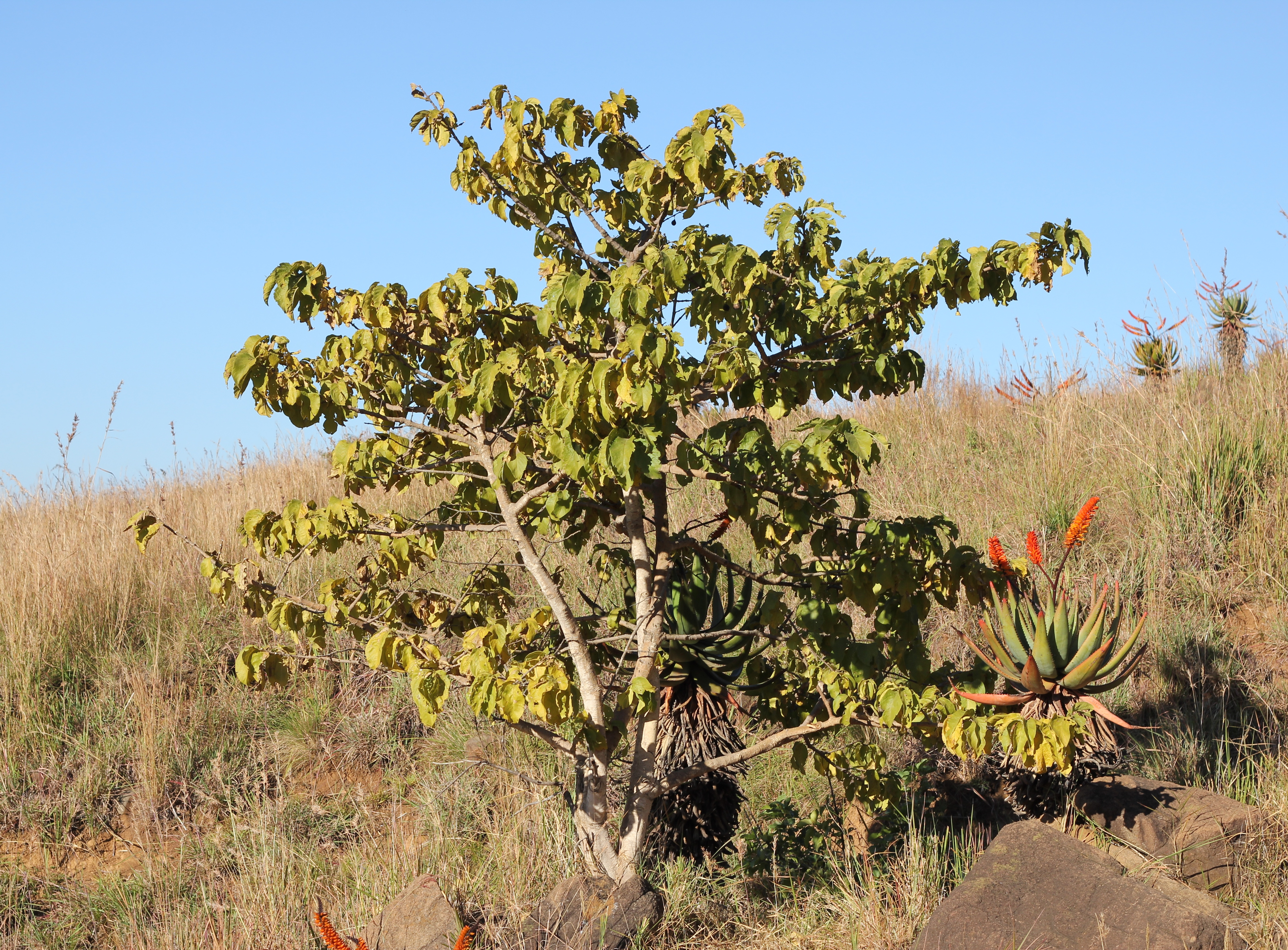

Scientific classification
- Kingdom: Plantae
- Clade: Tracheophytes
- Clade: Angiosperms
- Clade: Eudicots
- Clade: Asterids
- Order: Gentianales
- Family: Rubiaceae
- Genus: Vangueria
- Species: V. infausta

Binomial name
- Vangueria infausta Burch.

= Vangueria infausta =

African medlar

Species of tree

Vangueria infausta, the medlar or African medlar, is a species of plant in the family Rubiaceae, which is native to the southern and eastern Afrotropics. Some other names for V. infausta in Southern African languages include mpfilwa in Tsonga, ngayi in Tonga, mmilo in Northern Sotho, muzwilu in Venḓa, umviyo in Southern Ndebele, mothwani in Tswana and umtulwa in Zulu.

The fruits are consumed by humans and have a pleasant apple-like flavor. The specific name infausta alludes to a superstition that an evil spirit lives within the tree and the misfortune from its use as firewood which is said to 'unlock' the evil spirit from the wood. Many indigenous african names for V. infausta come from the Prot-Bantu mìdìdò (plural "fires").

== Description ==
The trees are low-branching and mostly smallish but may reach 8 m in height. They have drooping branchlets and have pale greyish brown, flaky bark. The fairly large, dull leaves have entire margins and are somewhat variable in shape. They have an opposite arrangement and conspicuous net-veining below. Young leaves are boat-shaped and recurved along the central vein.

Dense clusters of robust green flowers develop from pointed buds in spring. Each velvety flower is about 4 mm long and 6 mm wide, and are carried on opposite and axillary cymes. The corolla is dropped early.

The initially green and glossy fruit appear in summer, and bear the remains of the calyx around their tips. They develop into unevenly shaped, glossy, tan-coloured plums, that contain soft fleshy pulp and fairly large seeds.

== Range ==
This shrub or small tree occurs in abundance in woodlands, scrub, valleys, stony kopjes, or sandy dunes throughout much of Southern and East Africa, including Madagascar. In Africa it is native to Uganda, Kenya, Tanzania, Malawi, Mozambique, Zambia, Zimbabwe, Namibia, Botswana and South Africa. It may be found from 350 to 1,330 m above sea level.

== Uses ==
The African medlar is a traditional food plant in Africa. This little-known fruit has the potential to improve nutrition, boost food security, foster rural development and support sustainable land care. The fruit are consumed raw or the pulp may be dried and stored for later use, while the seeds may be roasted. Goats and game browse on the leaves, while other animals may consume the fruit on the tree, or after they are shed on the ground. The roots and leaves are used by traditional healers.

Thin twigs are prone to being populated by spittlebugs.

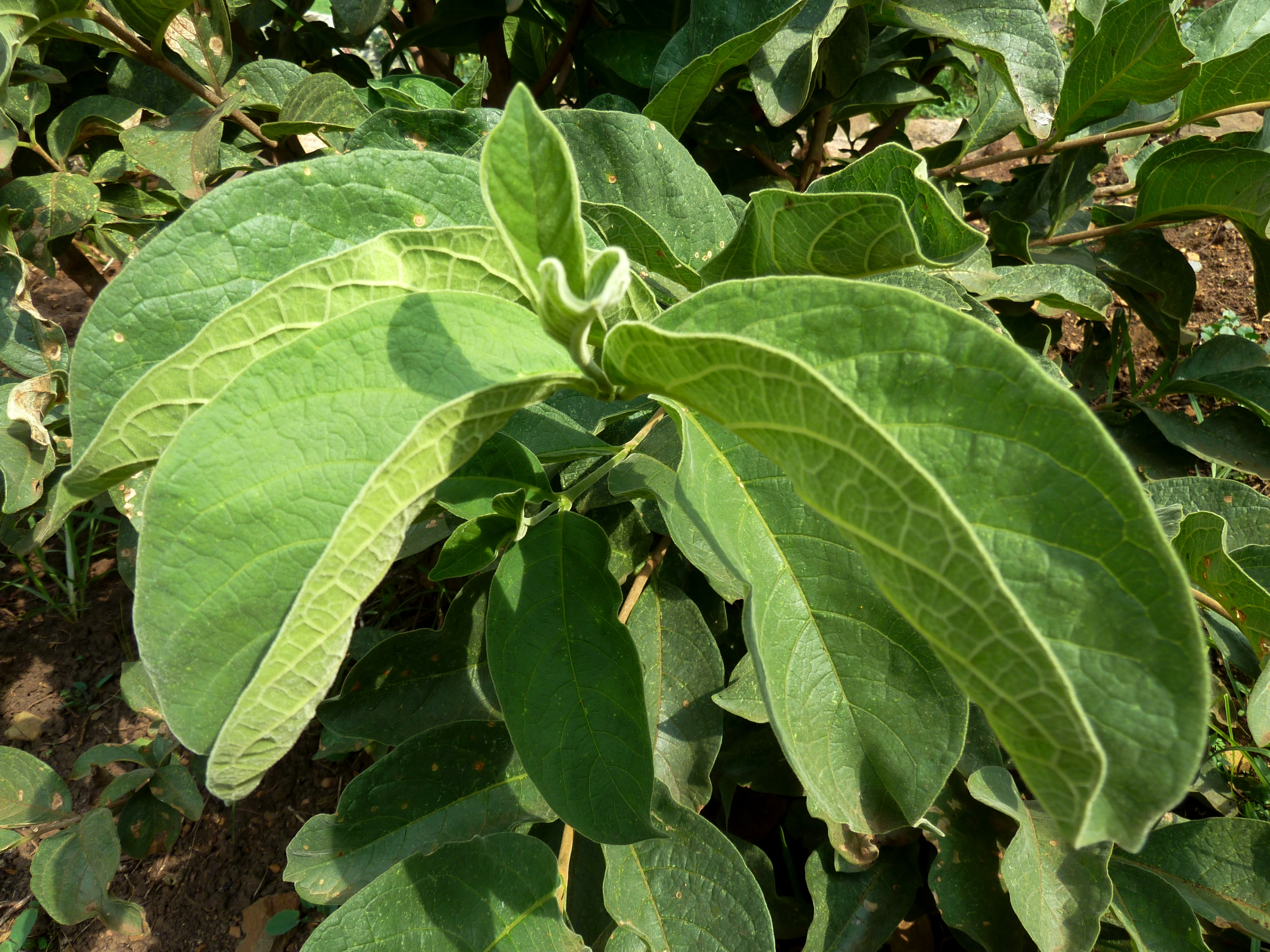
The boat-shaped leaves

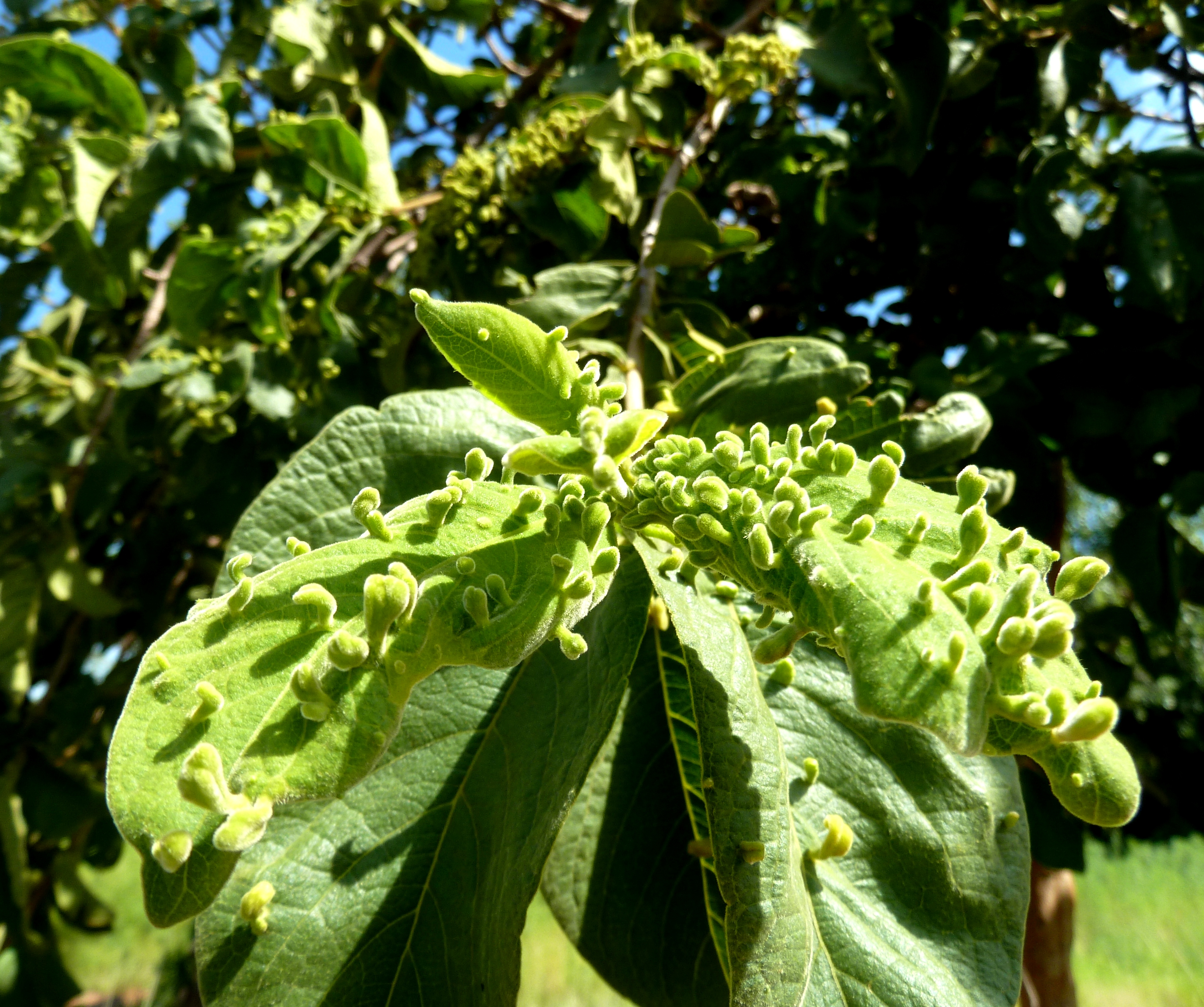
Acalitus mite galls on leaves

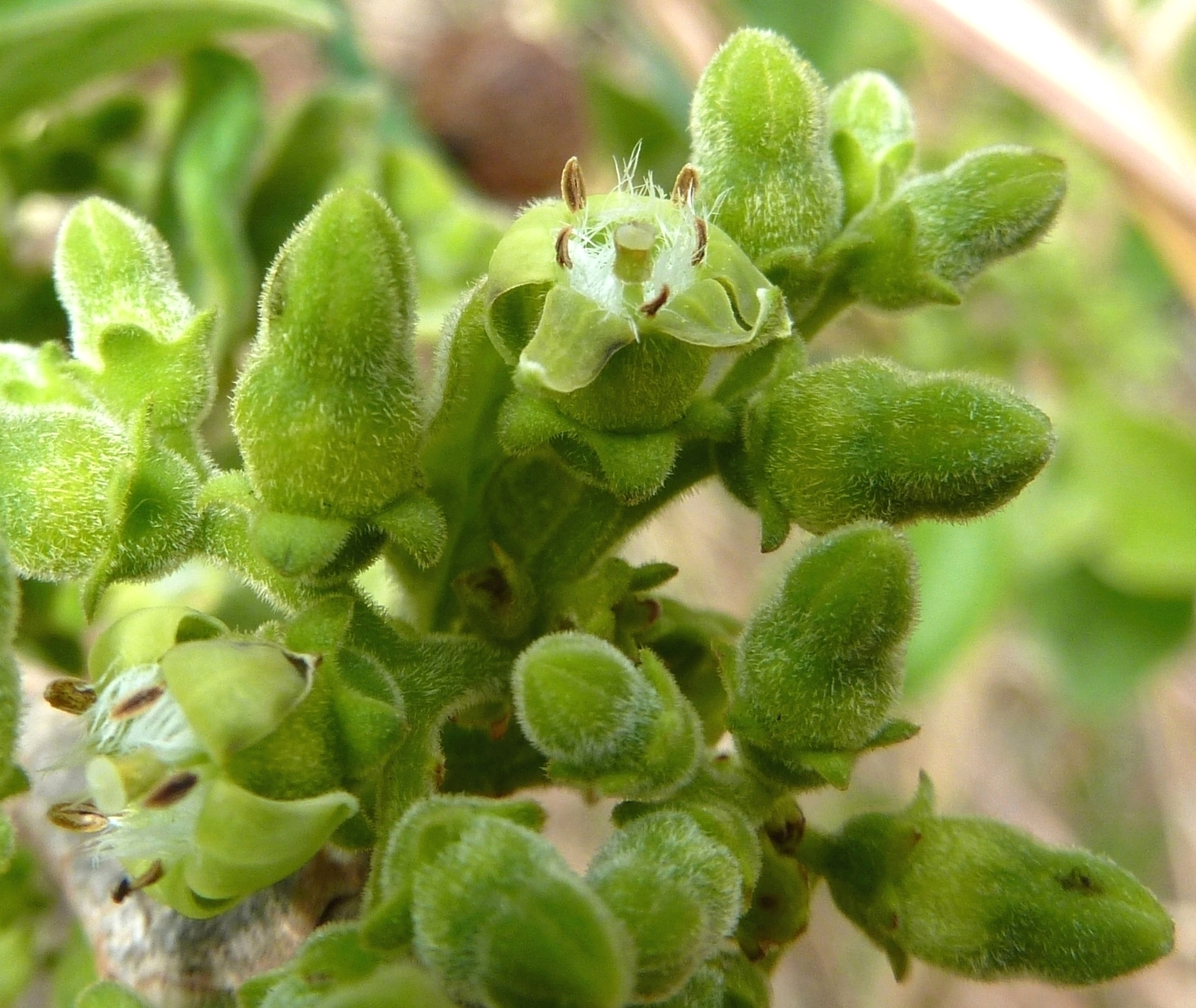
Flowers

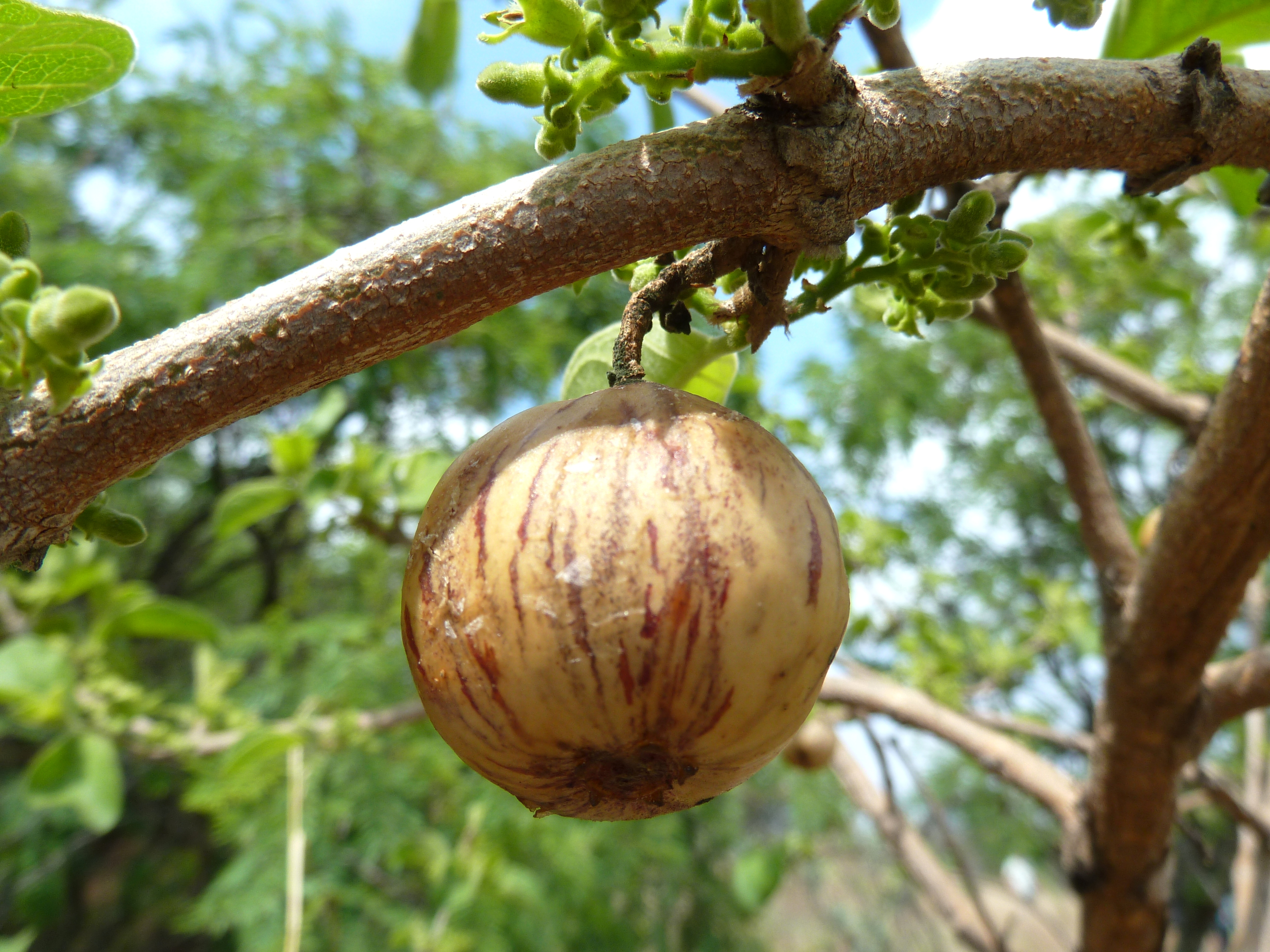
Fruit
