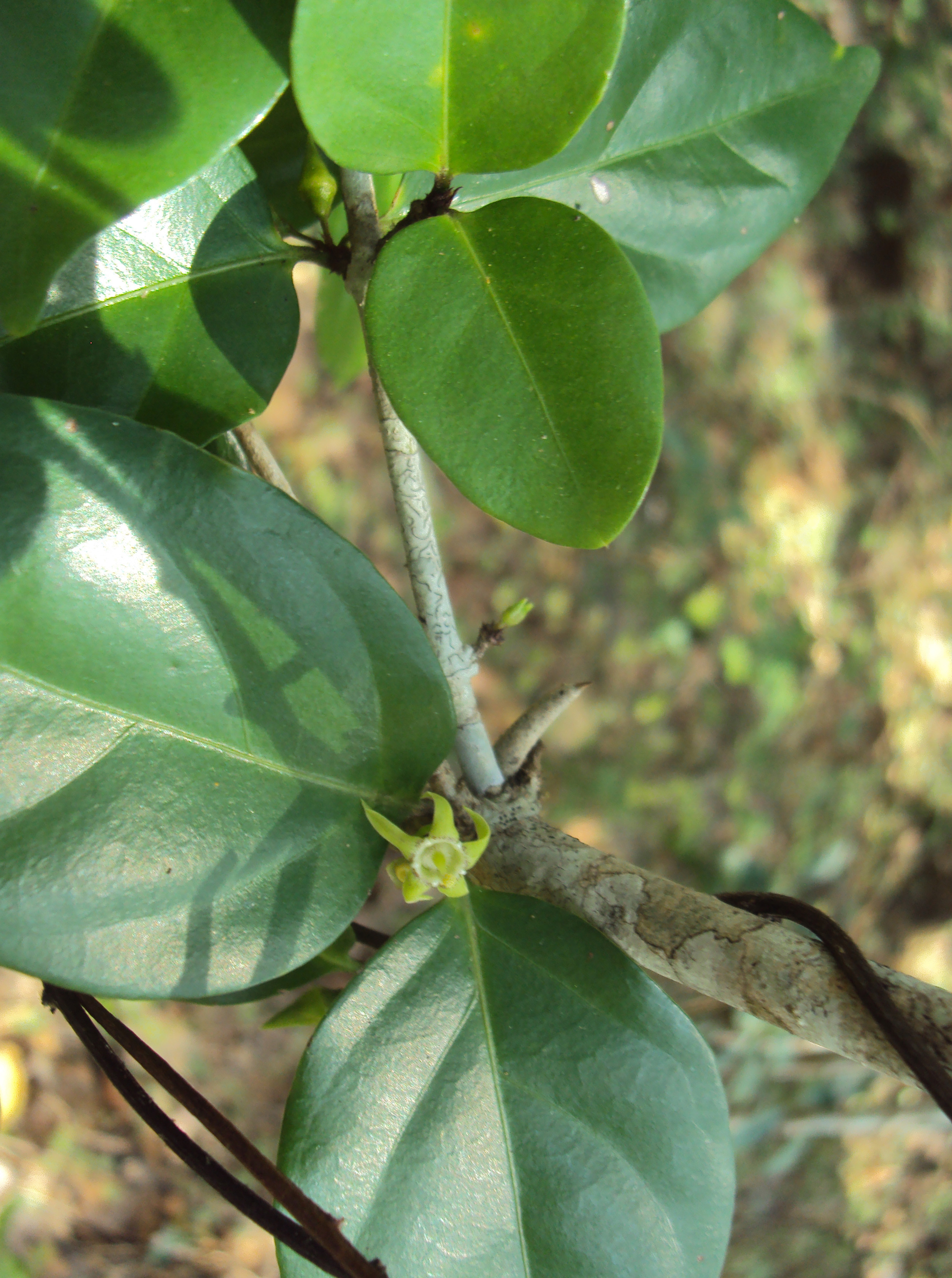

Scientific classification
- Kingdom: Plantae
- Clade: Tracheophytes
- Clade: Angiosperms
- Clade: Eudicots
- Clade: Asterids
- Order: Gentianales
- Family: Rubiaceae
- Genus: Canthium
- Species: C. angustifolium

Binomial name
- Canthium angustifolium Roxb.

Synonyms
- Canthium leschenaultii (DC.) Wight & Arn.; Canthium trachystyle Ridl.; Dondisia leschenaultii DC.

= Canthium angustifolium =

Narrow-leaved canthium

Species of plant

Canthium angustifolium, with the common name narrow-leaved canthium, is native to southern tropical Asia.

The large shrub is found in eastern India (including Assam), Bangladesh, and Myanmar (former Burma).
