= List of Rubiaceae of South Africa =

List of flowering plants in the family Rubiaceae recorded from South Africa

Rubiaceae is a family of flowering plants (anthophytes) in the order Gentianales, commonly known as the coffee, madder, or bedstraw family. It consists of terrestrial trees, shrubs, lianas, or herbs that are recognizable by simple, opposite leaves with interpetiolar stipules and sympetalous actinomorphic flowers. The family contains about 13,500 species in about 620 genera, which makes it the fourth-largest angiosperm family. Rubiaceae has a cosmopolitan distribution; however, the largest species diversity is concentrated in the tropics and subtropics.

23,420 species of vascular plant have been recorded in South Africa, making it the sixth most species-rich country in the world and the most species-rich country on the African continent. Of these, 153 species are considered to be threatened. Nine biomes have been described in South Africa: Fynbos, Succulent Karoo, desert, Nama Karoo, grassland, savanna, Albany thickets, the Indian Ocean coastal belt, and forests.

The 2018 South African National Biodiversity Institute's National Biodiversity Assessment plant checklist lists 35,130 taxa in the phyla Anthocerotophyta (hornworts (6)), Anthophyta (flowering plants (33534)), Bryophyta (mosses (685)), Cycadophyta (cycads (42)), Lycopodiophyta (Lycophytes(45)), Marchantiophyta (liverworts (376)), Pinophyta (conifers (33)), and Pteridophyta (cryptogams (408)).

65 genera are represented in the literature. Listed taxa include species, subspecies, varieties, and forms as recorded, some of which have subsequently been allocated to other taxa as synonyms, in which cases the accepted taxon is appended to the listing. Multiple entries under alternative names reflect taxonomic revision over time.

== Afrocanthium ==
Genus Afrocanthium:

- Afrocanthium gilfillanii (N.E.Br.) Lantz, indigenous
- Afrocanthium mundianum (Cham. & Schltdl.) Lantz, indigenous

== Agathisanthemum ==
Genus Agathisanthemum:

- Agathisanthemum bojeri Klotzsch, indigenous
  - Agathisanthemum bojeri Klotzsch subsp. bojeri, indigenous
- Agathisanthemum chlorophyllum (Hochst.) Bremek. indigenous
  - Agathisanthemum chlorophyllum (Hochst.) Bremek. var. chlorophyllum, endemic
  - Agathisanthemum chlorophyllum (Hochst.) Bremek. var. pubescens Bremek. endemic

== Alberta ==
Genus Alberta:

- Alberta magna E.Mey. endemic

== Ancylanthos ==
Genus Ancylanthos:

- Ancylanthos bainesii Hiern, accepted as Ancylanthos rubiginosus Desf.
- Ancylanthos monteiroi Oliv. accepted as Vangueria monteiroi (Oliv.) Lantz, indigenous

== Anthospermum ==
Genus Anthospermum:

- Anthospermum aethiopicum L. indigenous
- Anthospermum basuticum Puff, indigenous
- Anthospermum bergianum Cruse, endemic
- Anthospermum bicorne Puff, endemic
- Anthospermum comptonii Puff, endemic
- Anthospermum crocyllis Sond. accepted as Plocama crocyllis (Sond.) M.Backlund & Thulin, present
- Anthospermum dregei Sond. indigenous
  - Anthospermum dregei Sond. subsp. dregei, indigenous
  - Anthospermum dregei Sond. subsp. ecklonis (Sond.) Puff, endemic
- Anthospermum ericifolium (Licht. ex Roem. & Schult.) Kuntze, endemic
- Anthospermum esterhuysenianum Puff, indigenous
  - Anthospermum esterhuysenianum Puff var. esterhuysenianum, endemic
  - Anthospermum esterhuysenianum Puff var. hirsutum Puff, endemic
- Anthospermum galioides Rchb.f. indigenous
  - Anthospermum galioides Rchb.f. subsp. galioides, endemic
  - Anthospermum galioides Rchb.f. subsp. reflexifolium (Kuntze) Puff, endemic
- Anthospermum galpinii Schltr. endemic
- Anthospermum herbaceum L.f. indigenous
- Anthospermum hirtum Cruse, endemic
- Anthospermum hispidulum E.Mey. ex Sond. indigenous
- Anthospermum littoreum L.Bolus, endemic
- Anthospermum monticola Puff, indigenous
- Anthospermum paniculatum Cruse, endemic
- Anthospermum prostratum Sond. endemic
- Anthospermum rigidum Eckl. & Zeyh. indigenous
  - Anthospermum rigidum Eckl. & Zeyh. subsp. pumilum (Sond.) Puff, indigenous
  - Anthospermum rigidum Eckl. & Zeyh. subsp. rigidum, indigenous
- Anthospermum spathulatum Spreng. indigenous
  - Anthospermum spathulatum Spreng. subsp. ecklonianum (Cruse) Puff, endemic
  - Anthospermum spathulatum Spreng. subsp. saxatile Puff, endemic
  - Anthospermum spathulatum Spreng. subsp. spathulatum, indigenous
  - Anthospermum spathulatum Spreng. subsp. tulbaghense Puff, endemic
  - Anthospermum spathulatum Spreng. subsp. uitenhagense Puff, endemic
- Anthospermum streyi Puff, endemic
- Anthospermum welwitschii Hiern, indigenous

== Breonadia ==
Genus Breonadia:

- Breonadia salicina (Vahl) Hepper & J.R.I.Wood, indigenous

== Burchellia ==
Genus Burchellia:

- Burchellia bubalina (L.f.) Sims, indigenous

== Canthium ==
Genus Canthium:

- Canthium armatum (K.Schum.) Lantz, indigenous
- Canthium ciliatum (Klotzsch) Kuntze, indigenous
- Canthium gilfillanii (N.E.Br.) O.B.Mill. accepted as Afrocanthium gilfillanii (N.E.Br.) Lantz, indigenous
- Canthium inerme (L.f.) Kuntze, indigenous
- Canthium kuntzeanum Bridson, indigenous
- Canthium mundianum Cham. & Schltdl. accepted as Afrocanthium mundianum (Cham. & Schltdl.) Lantz, indigenous
- Canthium pseudorandii Bridson, accepted as Afrocanthium pseudorandii (Bridson) Lantz
- Canthium setiflorum Hiern, accepted as Bullockia setiflora (Hiern) Razafim. Lantz & B.Bremer, present
- Canthium spinosum (Klotzsch) Kuntze, indigenous
- Canthium suberosum Codd, indigenous
- Canthium vanwykii Tilney & Kok, endemic

== Carpacoce ==
Genus Carpacoce:

- Carpacoce burchellii Puff, endemic
- Carpacoce curvifolia Puff, endemic
- Carpacoce gigantea Puff, endemic
- Carpacoce heteromorpha (H.Buek) L.Bolus, endemic
- Carpacoce scabra (Thunb.) Sond. indigenous
  - Carpacoce scabra (Thunb.) Sond. subsp. rupestris Puff, endemic
  - Carpacoce scabra (Thunb.) Sond. subsp. scabra, endemic
- Carpacoce spermacocea (Rchb.f.) Sond. indigenous
  - Carpacoce spermacocea (Rchb.f.) Sond. subsp. orientalis Puff, endemic
  - Carpacoce spermacocea (Rchb.f.) Sond. subsp. spermacocea, endemic
- Carpacoce vaginellata T.M.Salter, endemic

== Catunaregam ==
Genus Catunaregam:

- Catunaregam obovata (Hochst.) A.E.GonÃ§. indigenous
- Catunaregam taylorii (S.Moore) Bridson, indigenous

== Cephalanthus ==
Genus Cephalanthus:

- Cephalanthus natalensis Oliv. indigenous

== Coddia ==
Genus Coddia:

- Coddia rudis (E.Mey. ex Harv.) Verdc. indigenous

== Coffea ==
Genus Coffea:

- Coffea racemosa Lour. indigenous
- Coffea zanguebariae Lour. indigenous

== Conostomium ==
Genus Conostomium:

- Conostomium natalense (Hochst.) Bremek. indigenous
  - Conostomium natalense (Hochst.) Bremek. var. glabrum Bremek. indigenous
  - Conostomium natalense (Hochst.) Bremek. var. natalense, indigenous
  - Conostomium natalense (Hochst.) Bremek. var. ovalifolium Bremek. indigenous
- Conostomium zoutpansbergense (Bremek.) Bremek. endemic

== Coprosma ==
Genus Coprosma:

- Coprosma repens A.Rich. not indigenous, cultivated, naturalised, invasive

== Coptosperma ==
Genus Coptosperma:

- Coptosperma littorale (Hiern) Degreef, indigenous
- Coptosperma rhodesiacum (Bremek.) Degreef, indigenous
- Coptosperma supra-axillare (Hemsl.) Degreef, indigenous
- Coptosperma zygoon (Bridson) Degreef, indigenous

== Cordylostigma ==
Genus Cordylostigma:

- Cordylostigma longifolia (Klotzsch) Groeninckx & Dessein, indigenous
- Cordylostigma virgata (Willd.) Groeninckx & Dessein, indigenous

== Crocyllis ==
Genus Crocyllis:

- Crocyllis anthospermoides E.Mey. ex K.Schum. accepted as Plocama crocyllis (Sond.) M.Backlund & Thulin, present

== Crossopteryx ==
Genus Crossopteryx:

- Crossopteryx febrifuga (Afzel. ex G.Don) Benth. indigenous

== Diodia ==
Genus Diodia:

- Diodia dasycephala Cham. & Schltdl. not indigenous, naturalised

== Diplospora ==
Genus Diplospora:

- Diplospora africana Sim, accepted as Empogona africana (Sim) Tosh & Robbr. indigenous

== Empogona ==
Genus Empogona:

- Empogona africana (Sim) Tosh & Robbr. endemic
- Empogona cacondensis (Hiern) Tosh & Robbr. indigenous
- Empogona coriacea (Sond.) Tosh & Robbr. indigenous
- Empogona junodii Schinz, accepted as Empogona kirkii Hook.f. subsp. junodii (Schinz) Tosh & Robbr. indigenous
- Empogona kirkii Hook.f. indigenous
  - Empogona kirkii Hook.f. subsp. junodii (Schinz) Tosh & Robbr. indigenous
  - Empogona kirkii Hook.f. subsp. kirkii, indigenous
- Empogona lanceolata (Sond.) Tosh & Robbr. indigenous
- Empogona maputensis (Bridson & A.E.van Wyk) Tosh & Robbr. indigenous

== Eriosemopsis ==
Genus Eriosemopsis:

- Eriosemopsis subanisophylla Robyns, endemic

== Fadogia ==
Genus Fadogia:

- Fadogia homblei De Wild. indigenous
- Fadogia tetraquetra K.Krause, indigenous
  - Fadogia tetraquetra K.Krause var. grandiflora (Robyns) Verdc. indigenous
  - Fadogia tetraquetra K.Krause var. tetraquetra, indigenous

== Gaillonia ==
Genus Gaillonia:

- Gaillonia crocyllis (Sond.) Thulin, accepted as Plocama crocyllis (Sond.) M.Backlund & Thulin, indigenous

== Galium ==
Genus Galium:

- Galium amatymbicum Eckl. & Zeyh. endemic
- Galium bredasdorpense Puff, endemic
- Galium capense Thunb. indigenous
  - Galium capense Thunb. subsp. capense, indigenous
  - Galium capense Thunb. subsp. garipense (Sond.) Puff var. garipense, indigenous
  - Galium capense Thunb. subsp. namaquense (Eckl. & Zeyh.) Puff, endemic
- Galium monticolum Sond. endemic
- Galium mucroniferum Sond. indigenous
  - Galium mucroniferum Sond. var. dregeanum (Sond.) Puff, indigenous
  - Galium mucroniferum Sond. var. mucroniferum, endemic
- Galium rourkei Puff, endemic
- Galium scabrelloides Puff, indigenous
- Galium spurium L. indigenous
  - Galium spurium L. subsp. africanum Verdc. indigenous
- Galium spurium-aparine complex, endemic
- Galium subvillosum Sond. indigenous
  - Galium subvillosum Sond. var. subglabrum Puff, endemic
  - Galium subvillosum Sond. var. subvillosum, indigenous
- Galium thunbergianum Eckl. & Zeyh. indigenous
  - Galium thunbergianum Eckl. & Zeyh. var. hirsutum (Sond.) Verdc. indigenous
  - Galium thunbergianum Eckl. & Zeyh. var. thunbergianum, indigenous
- Galium tomentosum Thunb. indigenous
- Galium undulatum Puff, endemic

== Galopina ==
Genus Galopina:

- Galopina aspera (Eckl. & Zeyh.) Walp. indigenous
- Galopina circaeoides Thunb. indigenous
- Galopina crocyllioides Bar ex Schinz, indigenous
- Galopina tomentosa Hochst. endemic

== Gardenia ==
Genus Gardenia:

- Gardenia citriodora Hook. accepted as Mitriostigma axillare Hochst. present
- Gardenia cornuta Hemsl. indigenous
- Gardenia lutea Fresen. accepted as Gardenia ternifolia Schumach. & Thonn. subsp. jovis-tonantis (Welw.) Verdc. var. jovis-tonantis, indigenous
- Gardenia resiniflua Hiern, indigenous
  - Gardenia resiniflua Hiern subsp. resiniflua, indigenous
- Gardenia ternifolia Schumach. & Thonn. indigenous
  - Gardenia ternifolia Schumach. & Thonn. subsp. jovis-tonantis (Welw.) Verdc. var. goetzei, indigenous
- Gardenia thunbergia L.f. indigenous
- Gardenia volkensii K.Schum. indigenous
  - Gardenia volkensii K.Schum. subsp. spatulifolia (Stapf & Hutch.) Verdc. indigenous
  - Gardenia volkensii K.Schum. subsp. volkensii var. saundersiae, indigenous
  - Gardenia volkensii K.Schum. subsp. volkensii var. volkensii, indigenous

== Geophila ==
Genus Geophila:

- Geophila repens (L.) I.M.Johnst. indigenous

== Guettarda ==
Genus Guettarda:

- Guettarda speciosa L. indigenous

== Hedyotis ==
Genus Hedyotis:

- Hedyotis gerrardii Harv. ex Sond. accepted as Cordylostigma virgata (Willd.) Groeninckx & Dessein, indigenous
- Hedyotis virgata Willd. accepted as Cordylostigma virgata (Willd.) Groeninckx & Dessein, indigenous

== Heinsia ==
Genus Heinsia:

- Heinsia crinita (Afzel.) G.Taylor, indigenous
  - Heinsia crinita (Afzel.) G.Taylor subsp. parviflora (K.Schum. & K.Krause) Verdc. indigenous

== Hymenodictyon ==
Genus Hymenodictyon:

- Hymenodictyon parvifolium Oliv. indigenous
  - Hymenodictyon parvifolium Oliv. subsp. parvifolium, indigenous

== Hyperacanthus ==
Genus Hyperacanthus:

- Hyperacanthus amoenus (Sims) Bridson, indigenous
- Hyperacanthus microphyllus (K.Schum.) Bridson, indigenous

== Hypobathrum ==
Genus Hypobathrum:

- Hypobathrum kirkii (Hook.f.) Baill. accepted as Empogona kirkii Hook.f. subsp. kirkii, indigenous
- Hypobathrum lanceolatum (Sond.) Baill. accepted as Empogona lanceolata (Sond.) Tosh & Robbr. indigenous

== Ixora ==
Genus Ixora:

- Ixora coccinea L. not indigenous, cultivated, naturalised, invasive

== Keetia ==
Genus Keetia:

- Keetia gueinzii (Sond.) Bridson, indigenous

== Kohautia ==
Genus Kohautia:

- Kohautia amatymbica Eckl. & Zeyh. indigenous
- Kohautia aspera (Roth) Bremek. indigenous
- Kohautia caespitosa Schnizl. indigenous
  - Kohautia caespitosa Schnizl. subsp. brachyloba (Sond.) D.Mantell, indigenous
- Kohautia cynanchica DC. indigenous
- Kohautia latibrachiata Bremek. endemic
- Kohautia longifolia Klotzsch, accepted as Cordylostigma longifolia (Klotzsch) Groeninckx & Dessein, indigenous
- Kohautia microflora D.Mantell, indigenous
- Kohautia subverticillata (K.Schum.) D.Mantell, indigenous
  - Kohautia subverticillata (K.Schum.) D.Mantell subsp. subverticillata, indigenous
- Kohautia virgata (Willd.) Bremek. accepted as Cordylostigma virgata (Willd.) Groeninckx & Dessein, indigenous

== Kraussia ==
Genus Kraussia:

- Kraussia coriacea Sond. accepted as Empogona coriacea (Sond.) Tosh & Robbr. indigenous
- Kraussia floribunda Harv. indigenous
- Kraussia lanceolata Sond. accepted as Empogona lanceolata (Sond.) Tosh & Robbr. indigenous
- Kraussia schlechteri (K.Schum.) Bullock, accepted as Kraussia floribunda Harv. present

== Lagynias ==
Genus Lagynias:

- Lagynias dryadum (S.Moore) Robyns, accepted as Vangueria dryadum S.Moore, indigenous
- Lagynias lasiantha (Sond.) Bullock, accepted as Vangueria lasiantha (Sond.) Sond. indigenous
- Lagynias monteiroi (Oliv.) Bridson, accepted as Vangueria monteiroi (Oliv.) Lantz, indigenous

== Leptactina ==
Genus Leptactina:

- Leptactina delagoensis K.Schum. indigenous
  - Leptactina delagoensis K.Schum. subsp. delagoensis, indigenous

== Mitriostigma ==
Genus Mitriostigma:

- Mitriostigma axillare Hochst. endemic

== Nenax ==
Genus Nenax:

- Nenax acerosa Gaertn. indigenous
  - Nenax acerosa Gaertn. subsp. acerosa, endemic
  - Nenax acerosa Gaertn. subsp. macrocarpa (Eckl. & Zeyh.) Puff, endemic
- Nenax arenicola Puff, endemic
- Nenax cinerea (Thunb.) Puff, indigenous
- Nenax coronata Puff, endemic
- Nenax divaricata T.M.Salter, endemic
- Nenax elsieae Puff, endemic
- Nenax hirta (Cruse) T.M.Salter, indigenous
  - Nenax hirta (Cruse) T.M.Salter subsp. calciphila Puff, endemic
  - Nenax hirta (Cruse) T.M.Salter subsp. hirta, endemic
- Nenax microphylla (Sond.) T.M.Salter, indigenous
- Nenax namaquensis Puff, endemic
- Nenax velutina J.C.Manning & Goldblatt, indigenous

== Oldenlandia ==
Genus Oldenlandia:

- Oldenlandia affinis (Roem. & Schult.) DC. indigenous
  - Oldenlandia affinis (Roem. & Schult.) DC. subsp. fugax (Vatke) Verdc. indigenous
- Oldenlandia capensis L.f. indigenous
  - Oldenlandia capensis L.f. var. capensis, indigenous
- Oldenlandia cephalotes (Hochst.) Kuntze, indigenous
  - Oldenlandia corymbosa L. indigenous
  - Oldenlandia corymbosa L. var. caespitosa (Benth.) Verdc. indigenous
- Oldenlandia geminiflora (Sond.) Kuntze, endemic
- Oldenlandia herbacea (L.) Roxb. indigenous
  - Oldenlandia herbacea (L.) Roxb. var. flaccida Bremek. indigenous
  - Oldenlandia herbacea (L.) Roxb. var. herbacea, indigenous
  - Oldenlandia herbacea (L.) Roxb. var. suffruticosa Bremek. endemic
- Oldenlandia lancifolia (Schumach.) DC. indigenous
  - Oldenlandia lancifolia (Schumach.) DC. var. scabridula Bremek. indigenous
- Oldenlandia muscosa Bremek. indigenous
- Oldenlandia rosulata K.Schum. indigenous
  - Oldenlandia rosulata K.Schum. var. rosulata, indigenous
- Oldenlandia rupicola (Sond.) Kuntze, indigenous
  - Oldenlandia rupicola (Sond.) Kuntze var. hirtula (Sond.) Bremek. indigenous
  - Oldenlandia rupicola (Sond.) Kuntze var. rupicola, indigenous
- Oldenlandia tenella (Hochst.) Kuntze, indigenous
- Oldenlandia virgata (Willd.) DC. accepted as Cordylostigma virgata (Willd.) Groeninckx & Dessein, indigenous

== Otiophora ==
Genus Otiophora:

- Otiophora calycophylla (Sond.) Schltr. & K.Schum. indigenous
  - Otiophora calycophylla (Sond.) Schltr. & K.Schum. subsp. calycophylla, endemic
  - Otiophora calycophylla (Sond.) Schltr. & K.Schum. subsp. verdcourtii Puff, endemic
- Otiophora cupheoides N.E.Br. indigenous

== Oxyanthus ==
Genus Oxyanthus:

- Oxyanthus latifolius Sond. indigenous
- Oxyanthus pyriformis (Hochst.) Skeels, indigenous
  - Oxyanthus pyriformis (Hochst.) Skeels subsp. pyriformis, indigenous
- Oxyanthus speciosus DC. indigenous
  - Oxyanthus speciosus DC. subsp. gerrardii (Sond.) Bridson, indigenous
  - Oxyanthus speciosus DC. subsp. stenocarpus (K.Schum.) Bridson, indigenous

== Pachystigma ==
Genus Pachystigma:

- Pachystigma bowkeri Robyns, indigenous
- Pachystigma caffrum (Sim) Robyns, indigenous
- Pachystigma coeruleum Robyns, indigenous
- Pachystigma cymosum Robyns, indigenous
- Pachystigma latifolium Sond. indigenous
- Pachystigma macrocalyx (Sond.) Robyns, indigenous
- Pachystigma pygmaeum (Schltr.) Robyns, indigenous
- Pachystigma thamnus Robyns, endemic
- Pachystigma triflorum Robyns, endemic
- Pachystigma venosum Hochst. indigenous

== Paederia ==
Genus Paederia:

- Paederia bojeriana (A.Rich.) Drake, indigenous
  - Paederia bojeriana (A.Rich.) Drake subsp. foetens (Hiern) Verdc. indigenous

== Pavetta ==
Genus Pavetta:

- Pavetta alexandrae Bremek. accepted as Pavetta lanceolata Eckl. present
- Pavetta assimilis Sond. var. assimilis, accepted as Pavetta gardeniifolia A.Rich. var. gardeniifolia, present
  - Pavetta assimilis Sond. var. brevituba-glabra Bremek. accepted as Pavetta gardeniifolia A.Rich. var. gardeniifolia, present
  - Pavetta assimilis Sond. var. brevituba-pubescens Bremek. accepted as Pavetta gardeniifolia A.Rich. var. subtomentosa K.Schum. present
  - Pavetta assimilis Sond. var. pubescens Bremek. accepted as Pavetta gardeniifolia A.Rich. var. subtomentosa K.Schum. present
- Pavetta barbertonensis Bremek. indigenous
- Pavetta bowkeri Harv. endemic
- Pavetta breyeri Bremek. accepted as Pavetta gracilifolia Bremek. present
  - Pavetta breyeri Bremek. var. glabra Bremek. accepted as Pavetta gracilifolia Bremek. present
- Pavetta capensis (Houtt.) Bremek. indigenous
  - Pavetta capensis (Houtt.) Bremek. subsp. capensis, endemic
  - Pavetta capensis (Houtt.) Bremek. subsp. komghensis (Bremek.) Kok, endemic
- Pavetta catophylla K.Schum. indigenous
- Pavetta cooperi Harv. & Sond. indigenous
- Pavetta disarticulata Galpin, accepted as Pavetta edentula Sond. present
- Pavetta edentula Sond. indigenous
- Pavetta eylesii S.Moore, indigenous
- Pavetta galpinii Bremek. indigenous
- Pavetta gardeniifolia A.Rich. indigenous
  - Pavetta gardeniifolia A.Rich. var. gardeniifolia, indigenous
  - Pavetta gardeniifolia A.Rich. var. subtomentosa K.Schum. indigenous
- Pavetta gerstneri Bremek. indigenous
- Pavetta glaucophylla S.J.Siebert, Retief & A.E.van Wyk, endemic
- Pavetta gracilifolia Bremek. indigenous
  - Pavetta gracilifolia Bremek. var. glabra Bremek. accepted as Pavetta gracilifolia Bremek. present
- Pavetta harborii S.Moore, indigenous
- Pavetta heidelbergensis Bremek. accepted as Pavetta gardeniifolia A.Rich. var. subtomentosa K.Schum. present
- Pavetta inandensis Bremek. indigenous
- Pavetta inconspicua Dinter ex Bremek. accepted as Pavetta zeyheri Sond. subsp. zeyheri
- Pavetta kotzei Bremek. endemic
- Pavetta krauseana K.Krause, accepted as Pavetta gardeniifolia A.Rich. var. gardeniifolia
- Pavetta lanceolata Eckl. indigenous
- Pavetta natalensis Sond. endemic
- Pavetta opaca Bremek. accepted as Pavetta lanceolata Eckl. present
- Pavetta revoluta Hochst. indigenous
- Pavetta schumanniana F.Hoffm. ex K.Schum. indigenous
- Pavetta trichardtensis Bremek. endemic
- Pavetta tristis Bremek. accepted as Pavetta lanceolata Eckl. present
- Pavetta tshikondeni N.Hahn, endemic
- Pavetta vanwykiana Bridson, indigenous
- Pavetta woodii Bremek. accepted as Pavetta gracilifolia Bremek. present
- Pavetta zeyheri Sond. indigenous
  - Pavetta zeyheri Sond. subsp. microlancea (K.Schum.) P.P.J.Herman, endemic
  - Pavetta zeyheri Sond. subsp. middelburgensis (Bremek.) P.P.J.Herman, endemic
  - Pavetta zeyheri Sond. subsp. zeyheri, indigenous

== Pentanisia ==
Genus Pentanisia:

- Pentanisia angustifolia (Hochst.) Hochst. indigenous
- Pentanisia prunelloides (Klotzsch ex Eckl. & Zeyh.) Walp. indigenous
  - Pentanisia prunelloides (Klotzsch ex Eckl. & Zeyh.) Walp. subsp. latifolia (Hochst.) Verdc. indigenous
  - Pentanisia prunelloides (Klotzsch ex Eckl. & Zeyh.) Walp. subsp. prunelloides, indigenous
- Pentanisia sykesii Hutch. indigenous
- Pentanisia sykesii Hutch. subsp. otomerioides Verdc. indigenous

== Pentas ==
Genus Pentas:

- Pentas angustifolia (A.Rich. ex DC.) Verdc. indigenous
- Pentas micrantha Baker, indigenous
  - Pentas micrantha Baker subsp. wyliei (N.E.Br.) Verdc. indigenous

== Pentodon ==
Genus Pentodon:

- Pentodon pentandrus (Schumach. & Thonn.) Vatke, indigenous
  - Pentodon pentandrus (Schumach. & Thonn.) Vatke var. minor Bremek. indigenous
  - Pentodon pentandrus (Schumach. & Thonn.) Vatke var. pentandrus, indigenous

== Phylohydrax ==
Genus Phylohydrax:

- Phylohydrax carnosa (Hochst.) Puff, indigenous

== Plectronia ==
Genus Plectronia:

- Plectronia foliosa Burtt Davy, accepted as Pavetta eylesii S.Moore, present
- Plectronia ventosa L. accepted as Olinia ventosa (L.) Cufod. indigenous

== Plectroniella ==
Genus Plectroniella:

- Plectroniella armata (K.Schum.) Robyns, accepted as Canthium armatum (K.Schum.) Lantz, indigenous
- Plectroniella capillaris Bremek. indigenous

== Plocama ==
Genus Plocama:

- Plocama crocyllis (Sond.) M.Backlund & Thulin, indigenous

== Psychotria ==
Genus Psychotria:

- Psychotria capensis (Eckl.) Vatke, indigenous
  - Psychotria capensis (Eckl.) Vatke subsp. capensis, indigenous
  - Psychotria capensis (Eckl.) Vatke subsp. capensis var. capensis, indigenous
  - Psychotria capensis (Eckl.) Vatke subsp. capensis var. pubescens, endemic
- Psychotria zombamontana (Kuntze) E.M.A.Petit, indigenous

== Psydrax ==
Genus Psydrax:

- Psydrax capensis J.C.Manning & Goldblatt, endemic
- Psydrax fragrantissima (K.Schum.) Bridson, indigenous
- Psydrax livida (Hiern) Bridson, indigenous
- Psydrax locuples (K.Schum.) Bridson, indigenous
- Psydrax obovata (Eckl. & Zeyh.) Bridson, indigenous
  - Psydrax obovata (Eckl. & Zeyh.) Bridson subsp. elliptica Bridson, indigenous
  - Psydrax obovata (Eckl. & Zeyh.) Bridson subsp. obovata, indigenous

== Pygmaeothamnus ==
Genus Pygmaeothamnus:

- Pygmaeothamnus chamaedendrum (Kuntze) Robyns, indigenous
  - Pygmaeothamnus chamaedendrum (Kuntze) Robyns var. chamaedendrum, endemic
  - Pygmaeothamnus chamaedendrum (Kuntze) Robyns var. setulosus Robyns, indigenous
- Pygmaeothamnus zeyheri (Sond.) Robyns, indigenous
  - Pygmaeothamnus zeyheri (Sond.) Robyns var. rogersii Robyns, endemic
  - Pygmaeothamnus zeyheri (Sond.) Robyns var. zeyheri, indigenous

== Pyrostria ==
Genus Pyrostria:

- Pyrostria hystrix (Bremek.) Bridson, indigenous

== Randia ==
Genus Randia:

- Randia bellatula K.Schum. accepted as Rothmannia capensis Thunb. present
- Randia kraussii Harv. accepted as Catunaregam obovata (Hochst.) A.E.GonÃ§. present
- Randia parvifolia Harv. accepted as Coddia rudis (E.Mey. ex Harv.) Verdc. present

== Richardia ==
Genus Richardia:

- Richardia brasiliensis Gomes, not indigenous, naturalised
- Richardia humistrata (Cham. & Schltdl.) Steud. not indigenous, naturalised
- Richardia scabra L. not indigenous, naturalised
- Richardia stellaris (Cham. & Schltdl.) Steud. not indigenous, naturalised

== Rothmannia ==
Genus Rothmannia:

- Rothmannia capensis Thunb. indigenous
- Rothmannia fischeri (K.Schum.) Bullock, indigenous
  - Rothmannia fischeri (K.Schum.) Bullock subsp. fischeri, indigenous
  - Rothmannia fischeri (K.Schum.) Bullock subsp. moramballae (Hiern) Bridson, indigenous
- Rothmannia globosa (Hochst.) Keay, indigenous

== Rubia ==
Genus Rubia:

- Rubia cordifolia L. subsp. conotricha (Gand.) Verdc. indigenous
- Rubia horrida (Thunb.) Puff, indigenous
- Rubia petiolaris DC. indigenous

== Rytigynia ==
Genus Rytigynia:

- Rytigynia celastroides (Baill.) Verdc. indigenous
  - Rytigynia celastroides (Baill.) Verdc. var. australis Verdc. indigenous

== Sericanthe ==
Genus Sericanthe:

- Sericanthe andongensis (Hiern) Robbr. indigenous
  - Sericanthe andongensis (Hiern) Robbr. subsp. andongensis, indigenous
  - Sericanthe andongensis (Hiern) Robbr. subsp. andongensis var. andongensis, indigenous
  - Sericanthe andongensis (Hiern) Robbr. subsp. legatii (Hutch.) Jordaan & H.M.Steyn, indigenous

== Sherardia ==
Genus Sherardia:

- Sherardia arvensis L. not indigenous, naturalised

== Spermacoce ==
Genus Spermacoce:

- Spermacoce deserti N.E.Br. endemic
- Spermacoce natalensis Hochst. indigenous
- Spermacoce senensis (Klotzsch) Hiern, indigenous

== Stylocoryne ==
Genus Stylocoryne:

- Stylocoryne barbertonensis Bremek. accepted as Coptosperma supra-axillare (Hemsl.) Degreef, present

== Tapiphyllum ==
Genus Tapiphyllum:

- Tapiphyllum parvifolium (Sond.) Robyns, accepted as Vangueria parvifolia Sond. present

== Tarenna ==
Genus Tarenna:

- Tarenna junodii (Schinz) Bremek. indigenous
- Tarenna littoralis (Hiern) Bridson, accepted as Coptosperma littorale (Hiern) Degreef, present
- Tarenna nigrescens (Hook.f.) Hiern, accepted as Coptosperma nigrescens Hook.f.
- Tarenna pavettoides (Harv.) Sim, indigenous
  - Tarenna pavettoides (Harv.) Sim subsp. pavettoides, indigenous
- Tarenna supra-axillaris (Hemsl.) Bremek. subsp. barbertonensis (Bremek.) Bridson, accepted as Coptosperma supra-axillare (Hemsl.) Degreef, present
- Tarenna zimbabwensis Bridson, accepted as Coptosperma rhodesiacum (Bremek.) Degreef, present
- Tarenna zygoon Bridson, accepted as Coptosperma zygoon (Bridson) Degreef, present

== Tricalysia ==
Genus Tricalysia:

- Tricalysia africana (Sim) Robbr. accepted as Empogona africana (Sim) Tosh & Robbr. endemic
- Tricalysia allenii (Stapf) Brenan, accepted as Empogona kirkii Hook.f. subsp. kirkii, indigenous
  - Tricalysia allenii (Stapf) Brenan var. australis (Schweick.) Brenan, accepted as Empogona kirkii Hook.f. subsp. junodii (Schinz) Tosh & Robbr. indigenous
  - Tricalysia allenii (Stapf) Brenan var. kirkii (Hook.f.) Brenan, accepted as Empogona kirkii Hook.f. subsp. kirkii, indigenous
- Tricalysia cacondensis Hiern, accepted as Empogona cacondensis (Hiern) Tosh & Robbr. indigenous
- Tricalysia capensis (Meisn. ex Hochst.) Sim, indigenous
  - Tricalysia capensis (Meisn. ex Hochst.) Sim var. capensis, indigenous
  - Tricalysia capensis (Meisn. ex Hochst.) Sim var. galpinii (Schinz) Robbr. indigenous
  - Tricalysia capensis (Meisn. ex Hochst.) Sim var. transvaalensis Robbr. indigenous
- Tricalysia coriacea (Benth.) Hiern, indigenous
- Tricalysia delagoensis Schinz, indigenous
- Tricalysia galpinii Schinz, accepted as Tricalysia capensis (Meisn. ex Hochst.) Sim var. galpinii (Schinz) Robbr. indigenous
- Tricalysia junodii (Schinz) Brenan, accepted as Empogona kirkii Hook.f. subsp. junodii (Schinz) Tosh & Robbr. indigenous
  - Tricalysia junodii (Schinz) Brenan var. kirkii (Hook.f.) Robbr. accepted as Empogona kirkii Hook.f. subsp. kirkii, indigenous
- Tricalysia lanceolata (Sond.) Burtt Davy, accepted as Empogona lanceolata (Sond.) Tosh & Robbr. indigenous
- Tricalysia maputensis Bridson & A.E.van Wyk, accepted as Empogona maputensis (Bridson & A.E.van Wyk) Tosh & Robbr. indigenous
- Tricalysia sonderiana Hiern, accepted as Empogona coriacea (Sond.) Tosh & Robbr. indigenous

== Trichostachys ==
Genus Trichostachys:

- Trichostachys speciosa Welw. accepted as Faurea rochetiana (A.Rich.) Chiov. ex Pic.Serm. indigenous

== Vangueria ==
Genus Vangueria:

- Vangueria bowkeri (Robyns) Lantz, indigenous
- Vangueria coerulea (Robyns) Lantz, indigenous
- Vangueria dryadum S.Moore, indigenous
- Vangueria esculenta S.Moore, indigenous
- Vangueria infausta Burch. indigenous
  - Vangueria infausta Burch. subsp. infausta, indigenous
- Vangueria lasiantha (Sond.) Sond. indigenous
- Vangueria lasioclados K.Schum. accepted as Vangueria proschii Briq.
- Vangueria madagascariensis J.F.Gmel. indigenous
- Vangueria monteiroi (Oliv.) Lantz, indigenous
- Vangueria randii S.Moore, indigenous
  - Vangueria randii S.Moore subsp. chartacea (Robyns) Verdc. indigenous
- Vangueria soutpansbergensis N.Hahn, endemic
- Vangueria thamnus (Robyns) Lantz, endemic
- Vangueria triflora (Robyns) Lantz, endemic
