= G. tinctoria =

G. tinctoria may refer to:

- Gaillonia tinctoria, a plant species endemic to Yemen
- Genista tinctoria, the dyer's greenweed, a plant species
- Gunnera tinctoria, the Chilean rhubarb, a plant species native to southern Chile and neighbour zones in Argentina

== See also ==
- Garcinia tinctoria, a synonym of Garcinia xanthochymus
