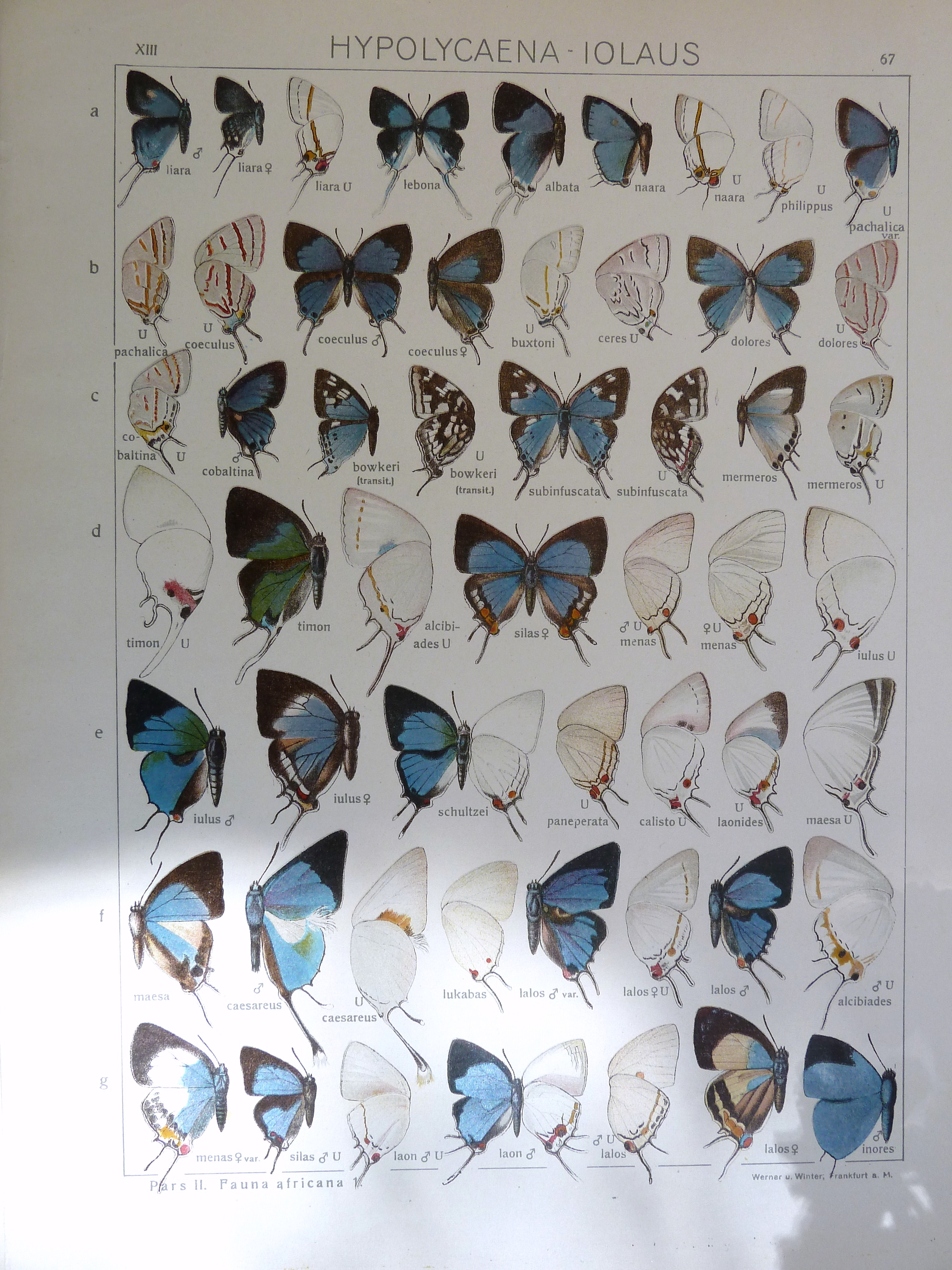
- Seitz Fauna African Taf 67 (line d)

Scientific classification
- Kingdom: Animalia
- Phylum: Arthropoda
- Class: Insecta
- Order: Lepidoptera
- Family: Lycaenidae
- Genus: Iolaus
- Species: I. menas

Binomial name
- Iolaus menas H. H. Druce, 1890

Synonyms
- Iolaus (Iolaphilus) menas; Iolaphilus menas tatiana d'Abrera, 1980

= Iolaus menas =

Species of butterfly

Iolaus menas, the blue savanna sapphire, is a butterfly in the family Lycaenidae. The species was first described by Hamilton Herbert Druce in 1890. It is found in Senegal, the Gambia, Burkina Faso, Guinea, Ivory Coast, Ghana, Nigeria, Cameroon, Sudan, Ethiopia, Uganda and Kenya. The habitat consists of savanna.

The larvae feed on Loranthus species and Tapinanthus bangwensis.

== Subspecies ==
- Iolaus menas menas (Senegal, Gambia, Burkina Faso, Guinea, Ivory Coast, Ghana, northern Nigeria, northern Cameroon, southern Sudan, Ethiopia)
- Iolaus menas tatiana (d'Abrera, 1980) (northern Uganda, northern Kenya)
