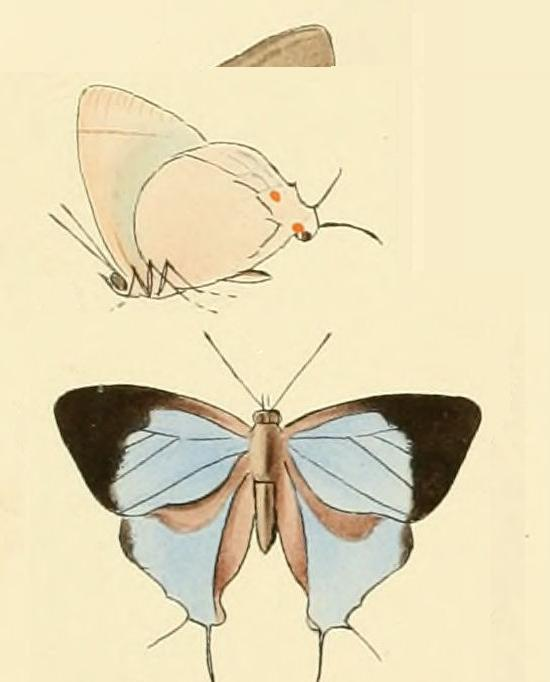

Conservation status
- Least Concern (IUCN 3.1)

Scientific classification
- Kingdom: Animalia
- Phylum: Arthropoda
- Class: Insecta
- Order: Lepidoptera
- Family: Lycaenidae
- Genus: Iolaus
- Species: I. iasis

Binomial name
- Iolaus iasis Hewitson, 1865

Synonyms
- Iolaus (Epamera) iasis; Jolaus bertha Suffert, 1904; Iolaus albomaculatus Sharpe, 1904

= Iolaus iasis =

Species of butterfly

Iolaus iasis, the iasis sapphire, is a butterfly in the family Lycaenidae. It is found in Senegal, Gambia, Guinea, Liberia, Ivory Coast, Ghana, Togo, Nigeria, Cameroon, Gabon, Angola, the Democratic Republic of the Congo, Uganda and Kenya. The habitat consists of forests and savanna. The species has also been recorded in cocoa plantations.

The larvae feed on the flowers of Loranthus incanus and Tapinanthus bangwensis.

== Subspecies ==
- Iolaus iasis iasis (Senegal, Gambia, Guinea, Liberia, Ivory Coast, Ghana, Togo, Nigeria: south and the Cross River loop, Cameroon, Gabon, Angola, northern Democratic Republic of the Congo)
- Iolaus iasis albomaculatus Sharpe, 1904 (Uganda, western Kenya)
