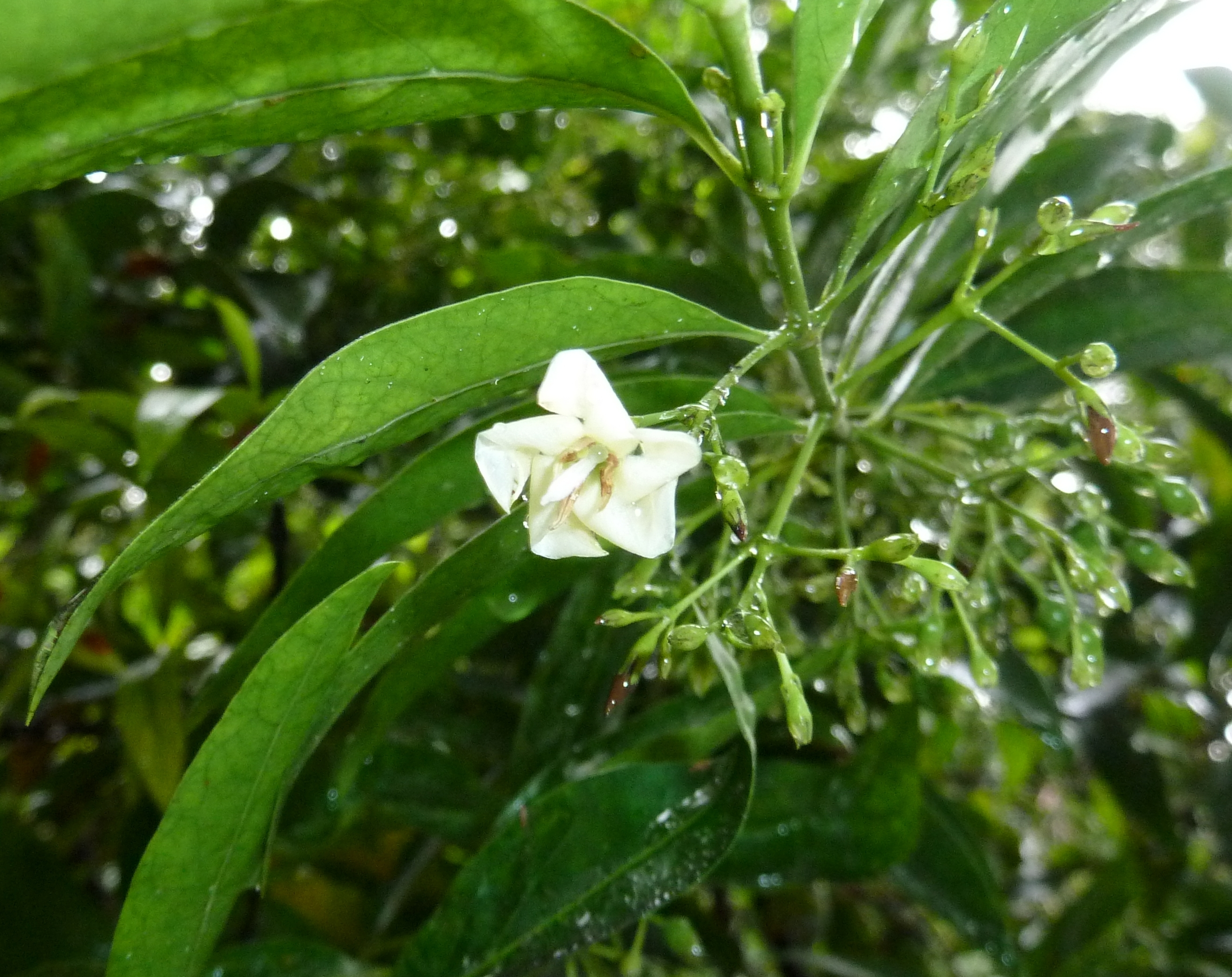
- Kraussia floribunda

Scientific classification
- Kingdom: Plantae
- Clade: Tracheophytes
- Clade: Angiosperms
- Clade: Eudicots
- Clade: Asterids
- Order: Gentianales
- Family: Rubiaceae
- Subfamily: Ixoroideae
- Tribe: Octotropideae
- Genus: Kraussia; Harv.

Synonyms
- Rhabdostigma Hook.f.

= Kraussia =

Genus of plants

Kraussia is a flowering plant genus in the family Rubiaceae. Apart from a species in Socotra, they are native to continental Africa. The type was described from a plant collected by Dr. F. Krauss near Durban. It is differentiated from Tricalysia and Empogona by the ovule arrangement inside the ovary cells. The genus contains between 4 and 10 species, including:

- Kraussia floribunda Harv. (1842)
- Kraussia kirkii (Hook.f.) Bullock
- Kraussia socotrana Bridson
- Kraussia speciosa Bullock
