= Empogona acidophylla =

Conservation status
- Vulnerable (IUCN 3.1)

Scientific classification
- Kingdom: Plantae
- Clade: Tracheophytes
- Clade: Angiosperms
- Clade: Eudicots
- Clade: Asterids
- Order: Gentianales
- Family: Rubiaceae
- Genus: Empogona
- Species: E. acidophylla

Binomial name
- Empogona acidophylla (Robbrecht) Tosh & Robbr.

Synonyms
- Tricalysia acidophylla

Species of plant

Empogona acidophylla is a species of plant in the family Rubiaceae. It is endemic to Tanzania.
