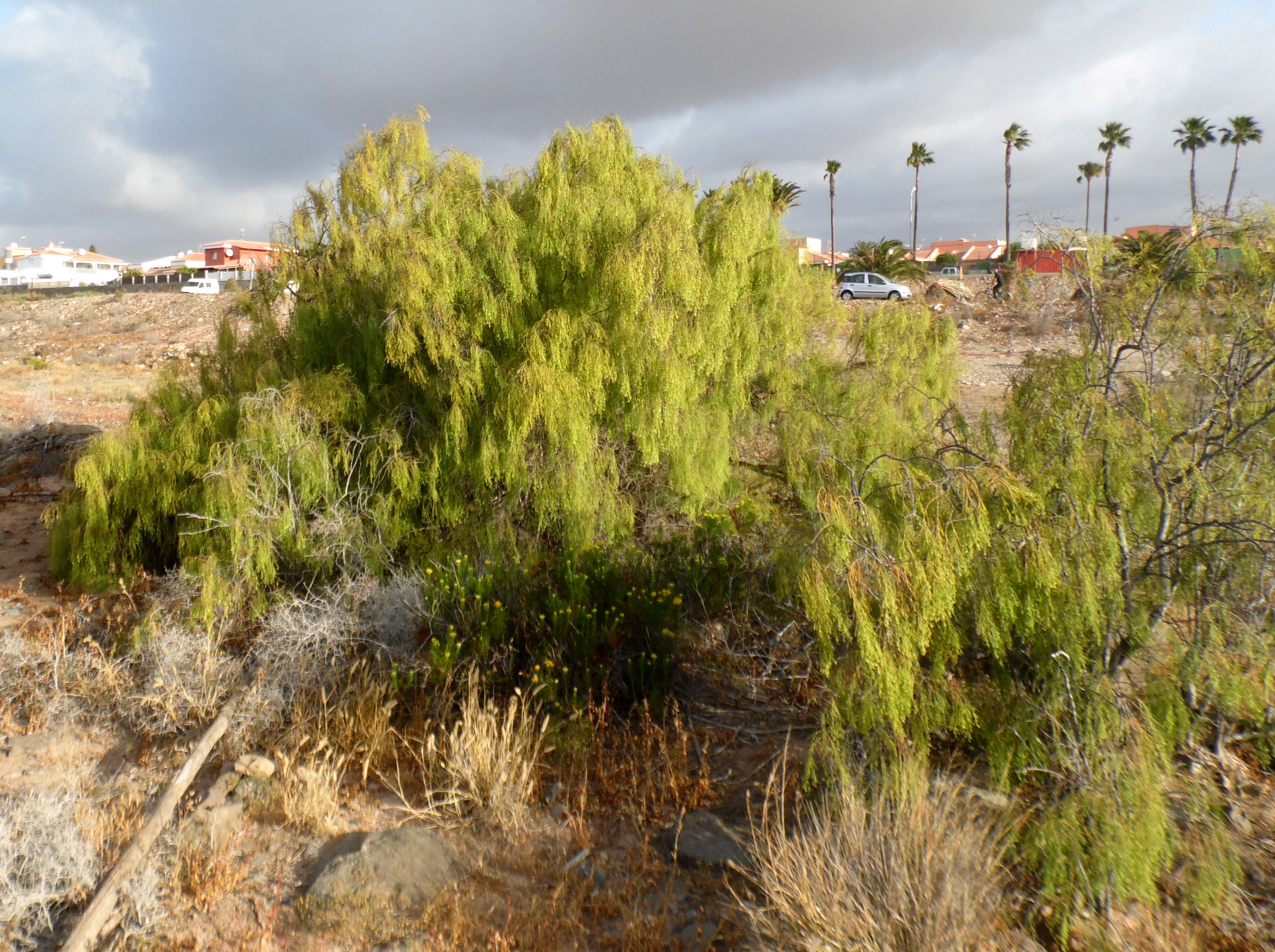

Scientific classification
- Kingdom: Plantae
- Clade: Embryophytes
- Clade: Tracheophytes
- Clade: Angiosperms
- Clade: Eudicots
- Clade: Asterids
- Order: Gentianales
- Family: Rubiaceae
- Genus: Plocama
- Species: P. pendula

Binomial name
- Plocama pendula Aiton

= Plocama pendula =

Species of flowering plant in the coffee family

Plocama pendula is a species of flowering plant in the coffee family Rubiaceae, endemic to the Canary Islands. It is a shrub growing up to 2 m (6 ft 7 in), with filiform (very narrow leaves) and minute flowers grouped near the tips of slender, pendulous branches. The fruit, a berry, is black.

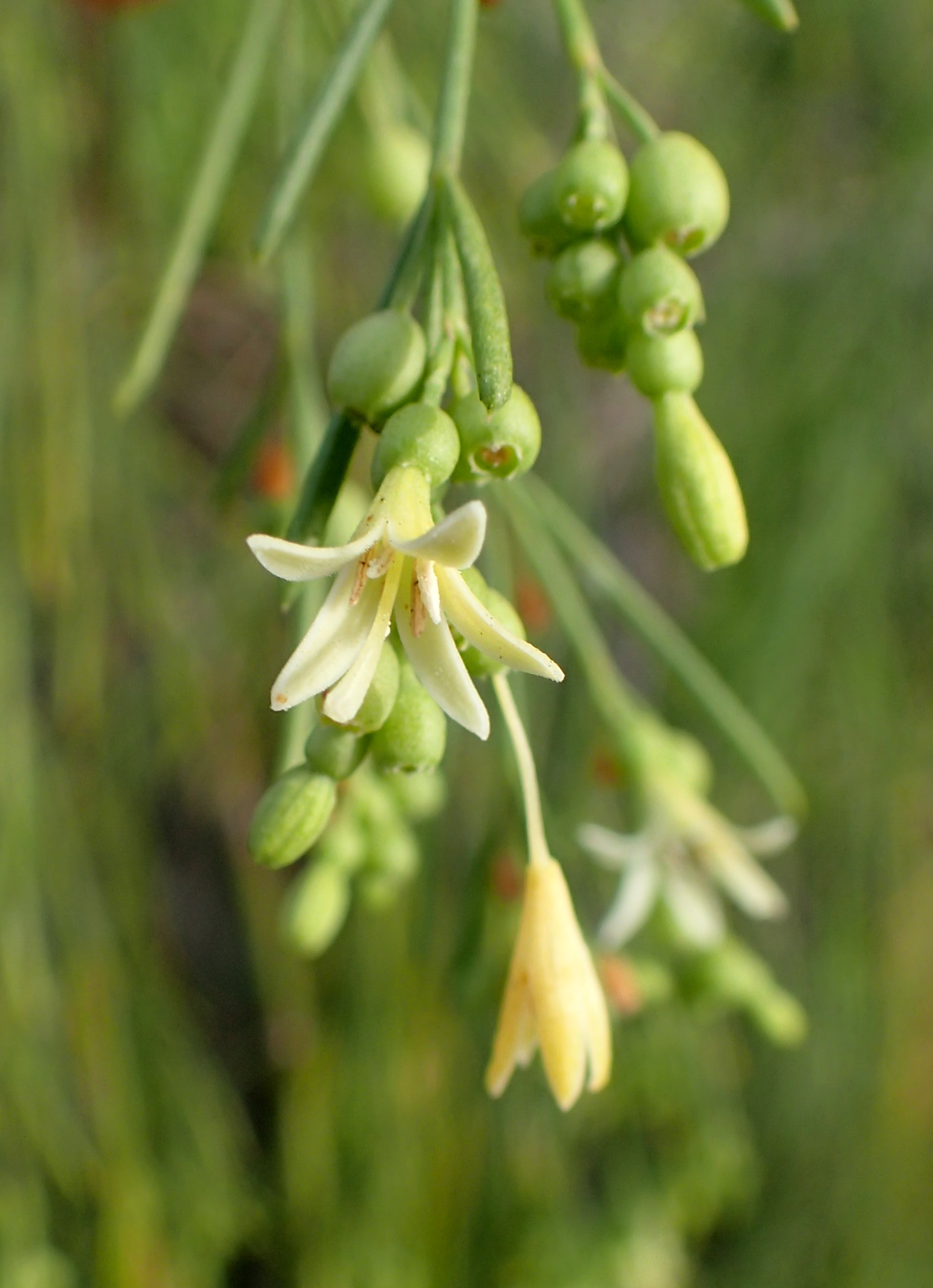
Flowers and young fruit
