= Kraussia speciosa =

Conservation status
- Least Concern (IUCN 3.1)

Scientific classification
- Kingdom: Plantae
- Clade: Tracheophytes
- Clade: Angiosperms
- Clade: Eudicots
- Clade: Asterids
- Order: Gentianales
- Family: Rubiaceae
- Genus: Kraussia
- Species: K. speciosa

Binomial name
- Kraussia speciosa Bullock

Species of plant

Kraussia speciosa is a species of plant in the family Rubiaceae. It is found in coastal Kenya and Tanzania, where it is associated with the Zanzibar-Inhambane regional mosaic.

== Sources ==
- Lovett, J. & Clarke, G.P. (1998). "Kraussia speciosa". IUCN Red List of Threatened Species. 1998 e.T35744A9955495. doi:10.2305/IUCN.UK.1998.RLTS.T35744A9955495.en.
