= Empogona talbotii =

Conservation status
- Vulnerable (IUCN 3.1)

Scientific classification
- Kingdom: Plantae
- Clade: Tracheophytes
- Clade: Angiosperms
- Clade: Eudicots
- Clade: Asterids
- Order: Gentianales
- Family: Rubiaceae
- Genus: Empogona
- Species: E. talbotii

Binomial name
- Empogona talbotii (Wernham) Tosh & Robbr.

Synonyms
- Tricalysia talbotii (Wernham) Keay

Species of plant

Empogona talbotii is a species of plant in the family Rubiaceae. It is found in Cameroon and Nigeria. Its natural habitat is subtropical or tropical moist lowland forests. It is threatened by habitat loss.
