= Tricalysia obstetrix =

Conservation status
- Vulnerable (IUCN 2.3)

Scientific classification
- Kingdom: Plantae
- Clade: Tracheophytes
- Clade: Angiosperms
- Clade: Eudicots
- Clade: Asterids
- Order: Gentianales
- Family: Rubiaceae
- Genus: Tricalysia
- Species: T. obstetrix

Binomial name
- Tricalysia obstetrix N.Hallé

Species of plant

Tricalysia obstetrix is a species of plant in the family Rubiaceae. It is endemic to Gabon. It is threatened by habitat loss.
