= Plocama puberula =

Conservation status
- Least Concern (IUCN 3.1)

Scientific classification
- Kingdom: Plantae
- Clade: Tracheophytes
- Clade: Angiosperms
- Clade: Eudicots
- Clade: Asterids
- Order: Gentianales
- Family: Rubiaceae
- Genus: Plocama
- Species: P. puberula

Binomial name
- Plocama puberula (Balf.f.) M.Backlund & Thulin (2007)

Synonyms
- Gaillonia puberula Balf.f. (1882); Neogaillonia puberula (Balf.f.) Lincz. (1973)

Species of plant

Plocama puberula is a species of flowering plant in the family Rubiaceae. It is endemic to the island of Socotra in Yemen. Its natural habitat is rocky areas on limestone escarpments from 30 to 650 metres elevation.
