= Plocama putorioides =

Conservation status
- Vulnerable (IUCN 3.1)

Scientific classification
- Kingdom: Plantae
- Clade: Tracheophytes
- Clade: Angiosperms
- Clade: Eudicots
- Clade: Asterids
- Order: Gentianales
- Family: Rubiaceae
- Genus: Plocama
- Species: P. putorioides

Binomial name
- Plocama putorioides (Radcl.-Sm.) M.Backlund & Thulin (2007)

Synonyms
- Gaillonia putorioides Radcl.-Sm. (1998); Jaubertia putorioides (Radcl.-Sm.) Thulin (1971); Neogaillonia putorioides (Radcl.-Sm.) Linchevskii (1973)

Species of plant

Plocama putorioides is a species of flowering plant in the family Rubiaceae. It is subshrub endemic to the central and eastern Hajhir Mountains on island of Socotra in Yemen. It grows in low montane evergreen shrubland on granite from 900 to 1,550 metres elevation.
