= Kraussia socotrana =

Conservation status
- Vulnerable (IUCN 3.1)

Scientific classification
- Kingdom: Plantae
- Clade: Tracheophytes
- Clade: Angiosperms
- Clade: Eudicots
- Clade: Asterids
- Order: Gentianales
- Family: Rubiaceae
- Genus: Kraussia
- Species: K. socotrana

Binomial name
- Kraussia socotrana Bridson (1995)

Species of plant

Kraussia socotrana is a species of plant in the family Rubiaceae. It is endemic to Socotra, Yemen. Its natural habitats are subtropical or tropical dry shrubland and rocky areas. The type was collected from Wadi Irih on the Nogad Plain.

It is a shrub up to 1m tall. The leaves are elliptic to oblong-elliptic, rounded to obtuse at the apex and rounded to cuneate at the base. Domatia are absent and the petioles are up to 5mm long. Flowers are carried in 3 to 8-flowered cymes. They are white, sometimes pink on the outside, forming a tube 6 to 7mm long.

== Sources ==
- Miller, A. (2004). "Kraussia socotrana". IUCN Red List of Threatened Species. 2004 e.T45022A10973878. doi:10.2305/IUCN.UK.2004.RLTS.T45022A10973878.en.
