= Tricalysia atherura =

Conservation status
- Vulnerable (IUCN 3.1)

Scientific classification
- Kingdom: Plantae
- Clade: Tracheophytes
- Clade: Angiosperms
- Clade: Eudicots
- Clade: Asterids
- Order: Gentianales
- Family: Rubiaceae
- Genus: Tricalysia
- Species: T. atherura

Binomial name
- Tricalysia atherura N.Hallé

Species of plant

Tricalysia atherura is a species of plant in the family Rubiaceae. It is found in Cameroon and Gabon. Its natural habitat is subtropical or tropical moist lowland forests. It is threatened by habitat loss.
