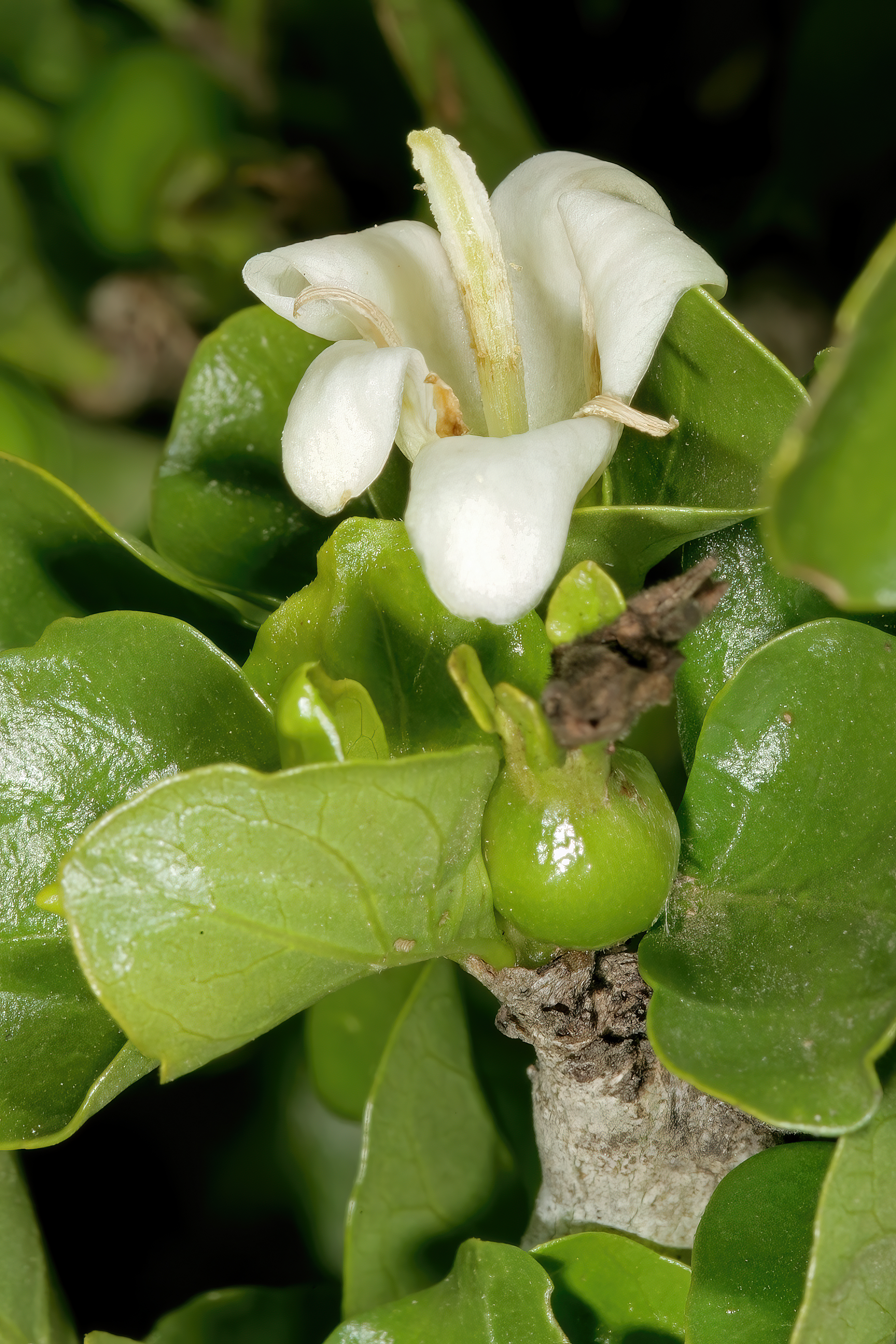
- Coddia rudis in Eastern Cape, South Africa

Scientific classification
- Kingdom: Plantae
- Clade: Tracheophytes
- Clade: Angiosperms
- Clade: Eudicots
- Clade: Asterids
- Order: Gentianales
- Family: Rubiaceae
- Subfamily: Ixoroideae
- Tribe: Gardenieae
- Genus: Coddia; Verdc.
- Species: C. rudis

Binomial name
- Coddia rudis (E.Mey. ex Harv.) Verdc.

Synonyms
- Gardenia microcarpa Hochst.; Heinsia capensis H.Buek ex Harv.; Lachnosiphonium rude (E.Mey. ex Harv.) J.G.Garcia; Lachnosiphonium rude var. parvifolium Yamam.; Randia parvifolia Harv.; Randia rudis E.Mey. ex Harv.; Xeromphis rudis (E.Mey. ex Harv.) Codd

= Coddia =

Genus of plants

Coddia is a monotypic genus of flowering plants in the family Rubiaceae. The genus contains only one species, viz. Coddia rudis, which is native to Mozambique, Zimbabwe, South Africa (the Cape Provinces, KwaZulu-Natal and the Northern Provinces), and Eswatini.
