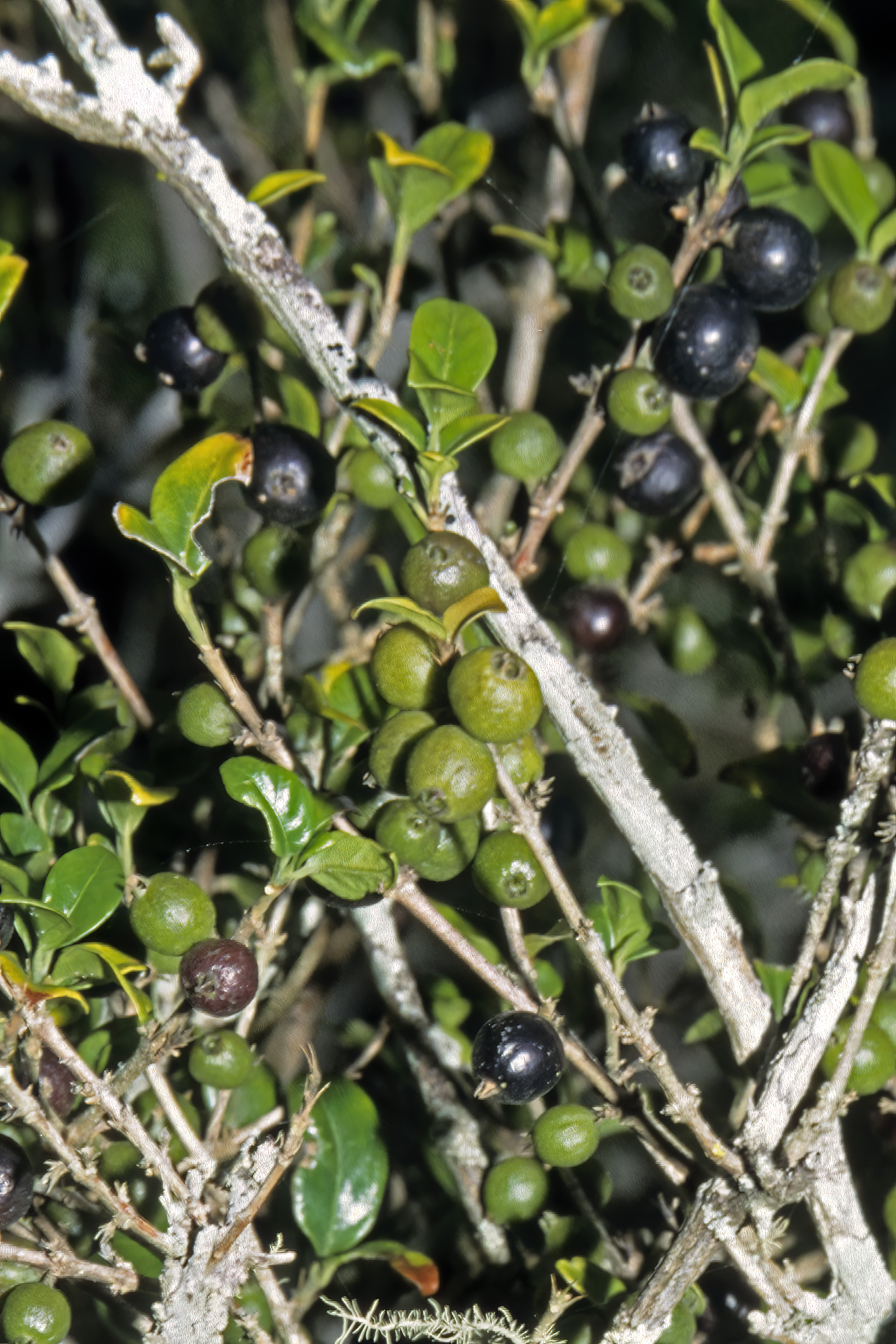

Conservation status
- Endangered (IUCN 3.1)

Scientific classification
- Kingdom: Plantae
- Clade: Tracheophytes
- Clade: Angiosperms
- Clade: Eudicots
- Clade: Asterids
- Order: Gentianales
- Family: Rubiaceae
- Genus: Empogona
- Species: E. africana

Binomial name
- Empogona africana (Sim) Tosh & Robbr.

Synonyms
- Tricalysia africana

= Empogona africana =

Species of flowering plant

Empogona africana is a species of plant in the family Rubiaceae. It is endemic to South Africa. It is threatened by habitat loss.
