= Tapinanthus bangwensis =

Scientific classification
- Kingdom: Plantae
- Clade: Tracheophytes
- Clade: Angiosperms
- Clade: Eudicots
- Order: Santalales
- Family: Loranthaceae
- Genus: Tapinanthus
- Species: T. bangwensis

Binomial name
- Tapinanthus bangwensis (Engl. & K.Krause) Danser

Synonyms
- Loranthus bangwensis Engl. & K.Krause; Tapinanthus globifer subsp. bangwensis (Engl. & K.Krause) Balle; Loranthus clavatus Thonn. ex DC.; Loranthus riggenbachii Engl. & K.Krause; Loranthus thonningii Schumach. & Thonn.; Tapinanthus thonningii (Schumach. & Thonn.) Danser

Species of mistletoe

Tapinanthus bangwensis is a species of hemiparasitic plant in the family Loranthaceae. It is native to the tropics of western sub-Saharan Africa.

== Range ==
It is native to the forest region from Senegal to Liberia and Sierra Leone.

== Description ==
It is a woody aerial shrub that is attached to its host plant by haustoria. It has a pendulous stem of up to 2 meters long, and the branchlets are abundantly covered with brown lenticels.

The leaves are geographically variable in size and thickness. They are reduced in Senegal, but larger southwards. The perianth tube is red at the bottom, becoming pink in the middle, and grey at the lobes. The filaments and style are initially green, but turn purple.

Its tricolporate pollen grain is oblate-spheroidal and rather large (40 x 43.5 μm) with its amb a truncated triangle, not unlike that of T. cordifolius.

== Host species ==
It parasitizes many plant species. These include Acacia farnesiana, A. nilotica, Alchornea cordifolia, Cola nitida, Coffea liberica, Crossopteryx, Croton, Machaerium, Manihot, Terminalia catappa and Theobroma.

== Uses ==
In Ghana the leaves are used to treat guinea worm infection, while in Nigeria, the leaves are used to treat various disorders including cancer and liver ailments. In Senegal the plant is used with Gardenia tricantha (Rubiaceae) for the treatment of leprosy.

Flavonoids, lectins, polypeptides, triterpenes and polyphenolic compounds have been reported in the plant. Phlobotannins, alkaloids, anthraquinones, besides cardiac and steroidal glycosides have also been reported.
