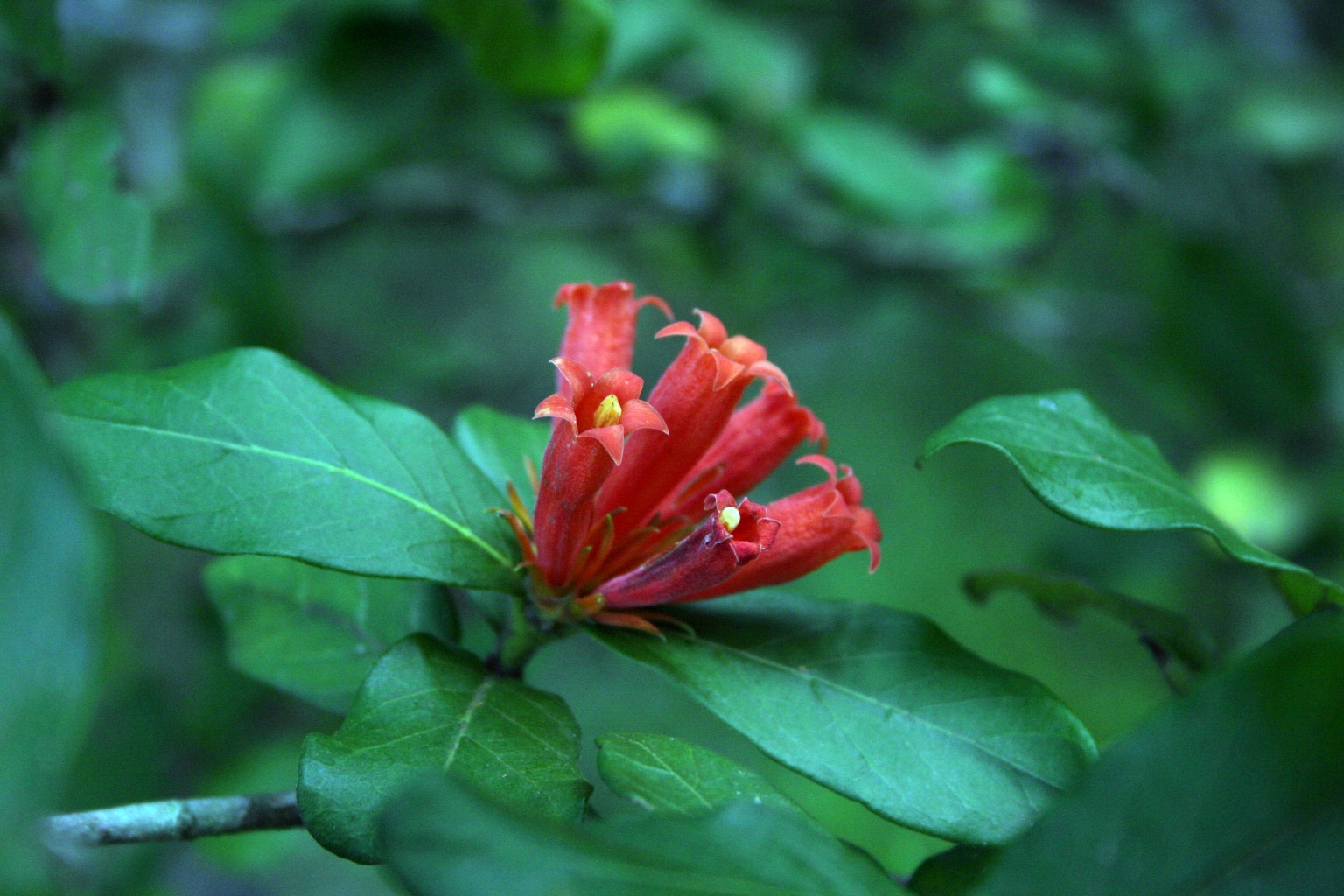

Conservation status
- Least Concern (IUCN 3.1)

Scientific classification
- Kingdom: Plantae
- Clade: Tracheophytes
- Clade: Angiosperms
- Clade: Eudicots
- Clade: Asterids
- Order: Gentianales
- Family: Rubiaceae
- Genus: Burchellia; R.Br.
- Species: B. bubalina

Binomial name
- Burchellia bubalina (L.f.) Sims

Synonyms
- Genus: Bubalina Raf.; Species: Burchellia capensis R.Br.; Burchellia capensis var. parviflora (Lindl.) Sond.; Burchellia kraussii Hochst.; Burchellia major Heynh.; Burchellia parviflora Lindl.; Burchellia speciosa Heynh.; Canephora capitata Willd.; Cephaelis bubalina (L.f.) Pers.; Cinchona capensis Burm. ex DC.; Genipa capensis (R.Br.) Baill.; Lonicera bubalina L.f.

= Burchellia =

Burchellia bubalina

Monotypic genus of plant endemic to South Africa

Burchellia is a monotypic genus of flowering plants in the family Rubiaceae. The genus contains only one species, viz. Burchellia bubalina, which is endemic to southern Africa: the Cape Provinces, KwaZulu-Natal and the Northern Provinces in South Africa, and Eswatini. It is commonly known as wild pomegranate (English) or wildegranaat (Afrikaans).

== Description ==
Burchellia bubalina is a small shrub or tree up to 8 metres tall. It has red flowers, grey-green bark and dark green leaves. It occurs in forests, rocky outcrops or in grasslands.

== Uses ==
The species is widely cultivated in frost-free gardens as an ornamental tree and has become a weed in some regions. The bark and root are used medicinally.

== Systematics ==
The name of the genus was given in honour of William John Burchell, an African explorer.

=== Taxonomy ===
The taxon was revised by John Sims in the species' first description in Curtis's Botanical Magazine in 1822. He gives this account of the earlier taxonomic history:

In the Supplementum Plantarum of the younger Linnæus this plant was referred to the genus Lonicera, but as it belongs to the natural order of Rubiaceae it will by no means associate with that genus. Persoon joined it with Swartz's Cephælis, the Tapocomea of Jean Baptiste Christophore Fusée Aublet and Bernard de Jussieu; but Mr. Brown not finding it to accord with any established genus, has considered it as distinct from any, and given it the name of Burchellia in honour of Mr. Burchell, a very enterprising traveller in Southern Africa, who has favoured the public with an interesting account of his travels in that country. And, certainly, persons who, in spite of deprivations and difficulties, spend a large portion of their valuable time in such hazardous undertakings, for the promotion of science, merit this only reward of the botanist; but we can by no means approve of altering the specific name, which, when once established, should remain inviolate, except for very particular reasons; we have therefore thought it right to restore the name of bubalina.

Following the formal description, he wrote as follows:

Burchellia bubalina is a native of the Cape of Good Hope, where it is called Buffelhorn or Buffaloe-Horn, a name given it by the colonists from the extreme hardness of its wood. Flowers in the spring or summer. Requires to be protected from frost and we believe has seldom blossomed in this country without the assistance of the heat of the stove. Communicated by Messrs. Loddiges and Sons.

== Gallery ==
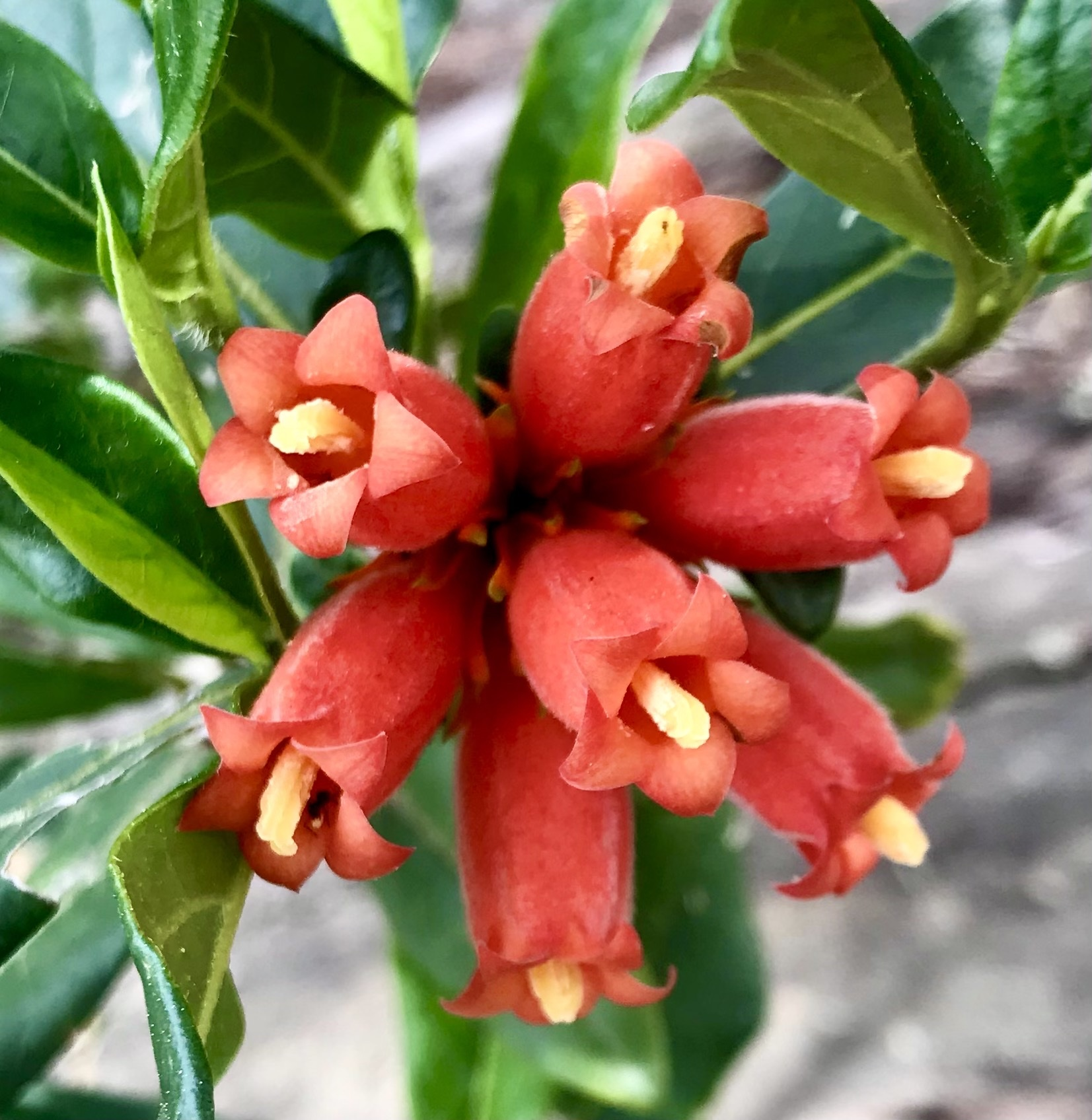
Close-up of the flowers

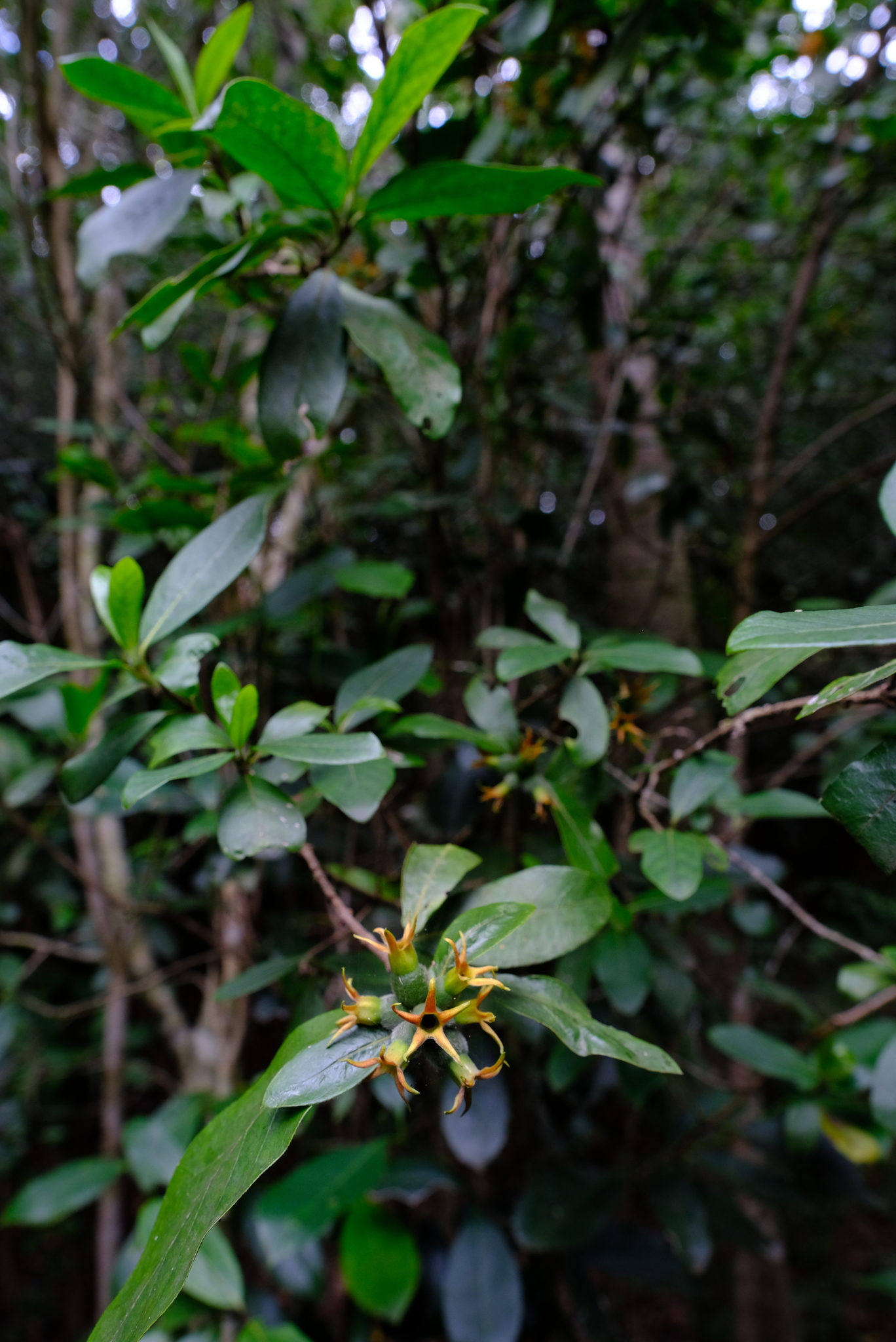

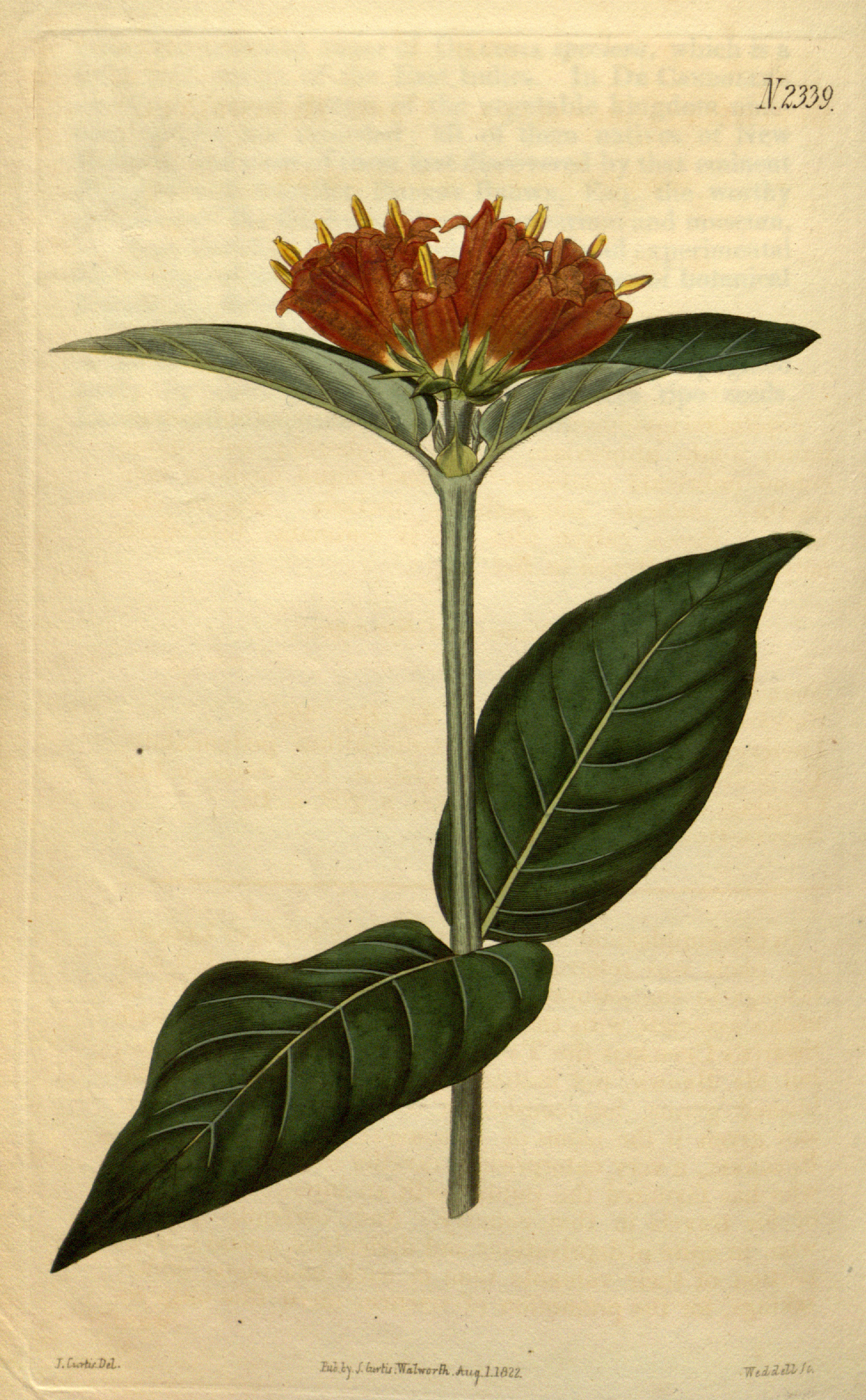
Pl. 2339 of Curtis's Botanical Magazine
