= Plocama tinctoria =

Conservation status
- Least Concern (IUCN 3.1)

Scientific classification
- Kingdom: Plantae
- Clade: Tracheophytes
- Clade: Angiosperms
- Clade: Eudicots
- Clade: Asterids
- Order: Gentianales
- Family: Rubiaceae
- Genus: Plocama
- Species: P. tinctoria

Binomial name
- Plocama tinctoria (Balf.f.) M.Backlund & Thulin

Synonyms
- Gaillonia tinctoria Balf.f. Gaillonia tinctoria var. glabra Radcl.-Sm. Neogaillonia tinctoria (Balf.f.) Lincz.

Species of plant

Plocama tinctoria is a species of flowering plant in the family Rubiaceae. It is endemic to northern Somalia and the Socotra archipelago of Yemen. Its natural habitat is subtropical or tropical dry forests. It is listed by the IUCN as a threatened species (category Least Concern) under the basionym Gaillonia tinctoria.
