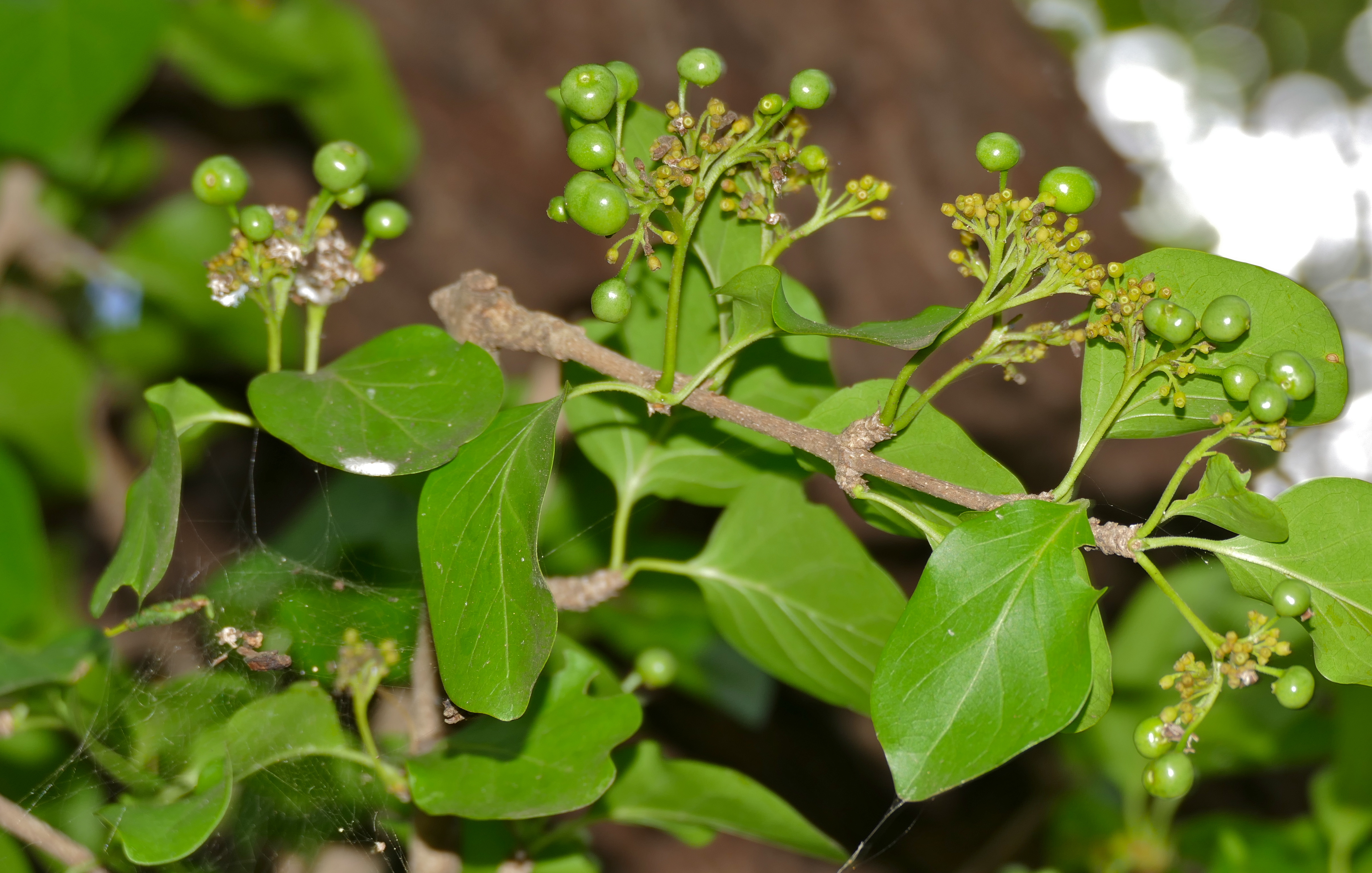

Scientific classification
- Kingdom: Plantae
- Clade: Tracheophytes
- Clade: Angiosperms
- Clade: Eudicots
- Clade: Asterids
- Order: Gentianales
- Family: Rubiaceae
- Subfamily: Dialypetalanthoideae
- Tribe: Vanguerieae
- Genus: Canthium
- Species: C. armatum

Binomial name
- Canthium armatum (K.Schum.) Lantz (2004)

Synonyms
- Canthium ovatum (Burtt Davy) Burtt Davy (1935); Plectronia ovata Burtt Davy (1921); Plectroniella armata (K.Schum.) Robyns (1928); Plectroniella capillaris Bremek. (1933); Vangueria armata K.Schum. (1899)

= Canthium armatum =

Genus of flowering plants

Canthium armatum is a species of flowering plants in the family Rubiaceae. It is a shrub or tree native to southern Mozambique, Eswatini, and KwaZulu-Natal and the Northern Provinces of northeastern South Africa. The species is characterized by the presence of large spines.

It was first described as Vangueria armata in 1899 by Karl Moritz Schumann. In 1928 Walter Robyns placed it in a new monotypic genus, Plectroniella. In 2004, a molecular phylogenetic study showed that Plectroniella armata was related to Canthium ciliatum and species was transferred to the genus Canthium.
