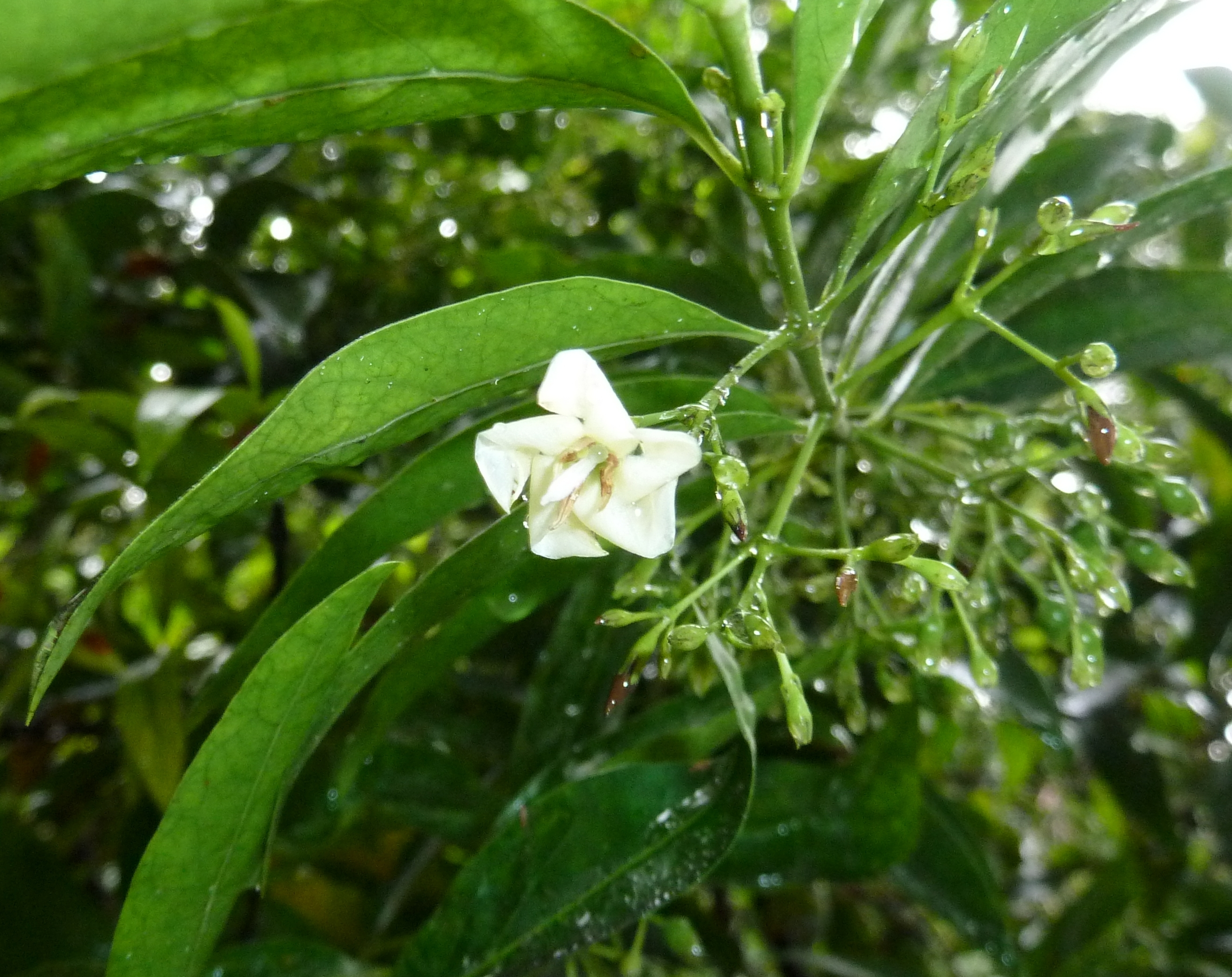

Conservation status
- Least Concern (IUCN 3.1)

Scientific classification
- Kingdom: Plantae
- Clade: Tracheophytes
- Clade: Angiosperms
- Clade: Eudicots
- Clade: Asterids
- Order: Gentianales
- Family: Rubiaceae
- Genus: Kraussia
- Species: K. floribunda

Binomial name
- Kraussia floribunda Harv.

Synonyms
- Tricalysia floribunda (Harv.) Stuntz; Coffea kraussiana Hochst.; Kraussia incerta Bullock; Kraussia schlechteri (K.Schum.) Bullock; Psychotria oblongifolia E.Mey.; Rhabdostigma schlechteri K.Schum.; Tricalysia kraussiana (Hochst.) Schinz

= Kraussia floribunda =

Species of plant

Kraussia floribunda is a species of plant in the family Rubiaceae. It ranges from Mozambique and Eswatini to eastern South Africa, and is associated with the Tongoland-Pondoland regional mosaic. The type was described from a plant collected by Dr. F. Krauss near Durban.

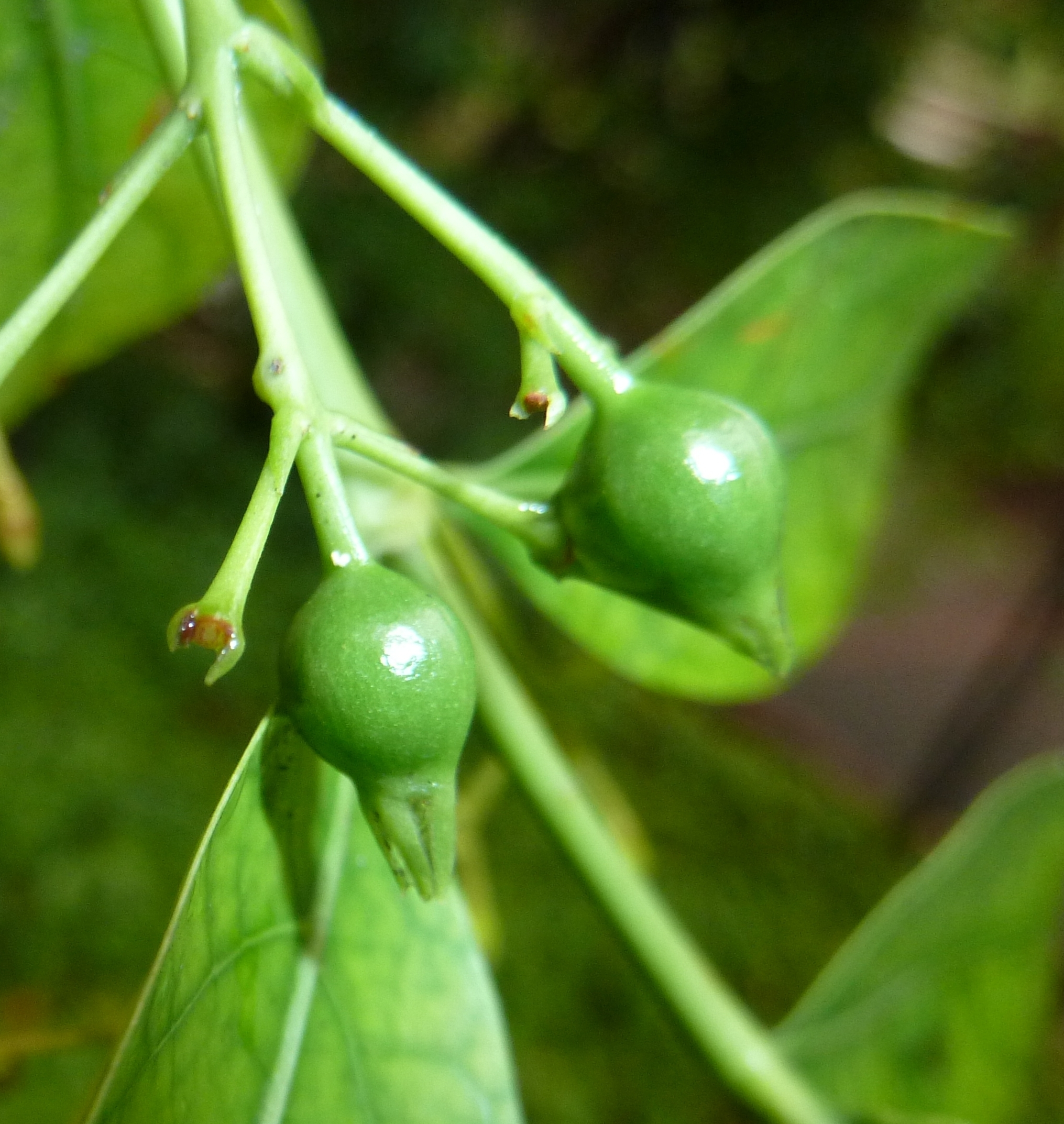
Fruit
