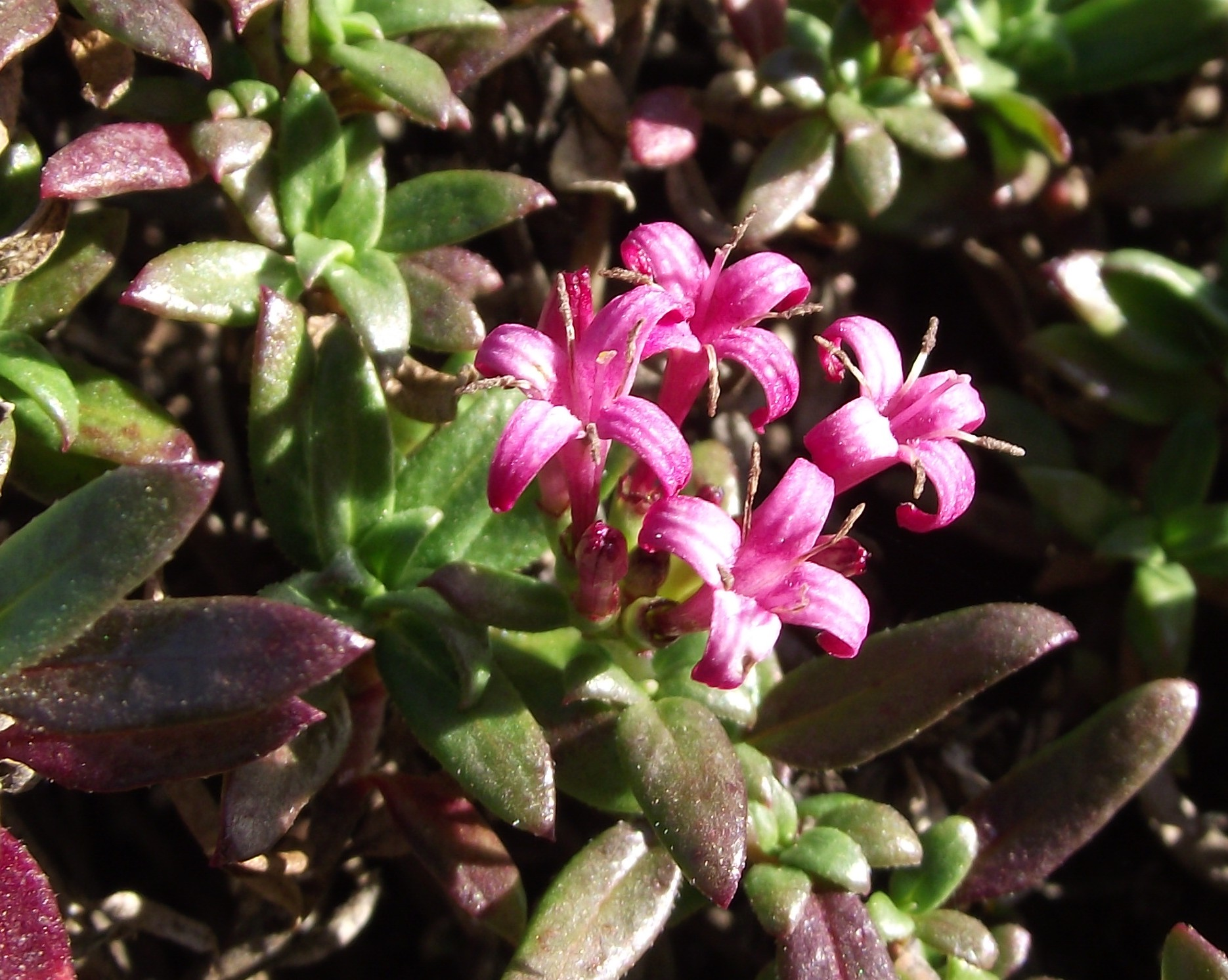
- Plocama calabrica

Scientific classification
- Kingdom: Plantae
- Clade: Tracheophytes
- Clade: Angiosperms
- Clade: Eudicots
- Clade: Asterids
- Order: Gentianales
- Family: Rubiaceae
- Subfamily: Rubioideae
- Tribe: Putorieae
- Genus: Plocama; Aiton

Type species
- Plocama pendula Aiton

Synonyms
- 10 synonyms: Bartlingia Rchb.; Choulettia Pomel; Crocyllis E.Mey. ex Hook.f.; Gaillonia A.Rich. ex DC.; Jaubertia Guill.; Neogaillonia Lincz.; Placodium Benth. & Hook.f.; Pseudogaillonia Linchevskii; Pterogaillonia Linchevskii; Putoria Pers.

= Plocama =

Genus of plants

Plocama is a genus of flowering plants in the family Rubiaceae. It was described by William Aiton in 1789. It is distributed from the Canary Islands to northwestern India.

The genus was expanded in 2007 when several other Rubiaceae genera were merged into it. There are now about 34 species.

Plants of this genus are herbs or shrubs. They generally have an offensive scent when crushed. The leaves are oppositely arranged. The corolla is funnel shaped with a short to long tubular base. The fruit is either a drupe or a body that splits into two parts when ripe.

== Species ==
As of January 2026, Plants of the World Online accepts the following 36 species:

- Plocama afghanica (Ehrend.) M.Backlund & Thulin
- Plocama alshehbazii F.O.Khass., Khamraeva, Khuzhan. & Achilova
- Plocama asperuliformis (Lincz.) M.Backlund & Thulin
- Plocama aucheri (Guill.) M.Backlund & Thulin
- Plocama botschantzevii (Lincz.) M.Backlund & Thulin
- Plocama brevifolia (Coss. & Durieu ex Pomel) M.Backlund & Thulin
- Plocama bruguieri (A.Rich. ex DC.) M.Backlund & Thulin
- Plocama bucharica (B.Fedtsch. & Des.-Shost.) M.Backlund & Thulin
- Plocama calabrica (L.f.) M.Backlund & Thulin
- Plocama calcicola (Puff) M.Backlund & Thulin
- Plocama calycoptera (Decne.) M.Backlund & Thulin
- Plocama crocyllis (Sond.) M.Backlund & Thulin
- Plocama crucianelloides (Jaub. & Spach) M.Backlund & Thulin
- Plocama dezfulensis (Naanaie & Assadi) Bordbar & Mirtadz.
- Plocama dubia (Aitch. & Hemsl.) M.Backlund & Thulin
- Plocama ehrendorferi Mirtadz. & Bordbar
- Plocama eriantha (Jaub. & Spach) M.Backlund & Thulin
- Plocama hymenostephana (Jaub. & Spach) M.Backlund & Thulin
- Plocama iljinii (Lincz.) M.Backlund & Thulin
- Plocama inopinata (Lincz.) M.Backlund & Thulin
- Plocama jolana (Thulin) M.Backlund & Thulin
- Plocama kandaharensis (Ehrend. & Qarar ex Ehrend. & Schönb.-Tem.) M.Backlund & Thulin
- Plocama macrantha (Blatt. & Hallb.) M.Backlund & Thulin
- Plocama mestscherjakovii (Lincz.) M.Backlund & Thulin
- Plocama olivieri (A.Rich. ex DC.) M.Backlund & Thulin
- Plocama pendula Aiton
- Plocama puberula (Balf.f.) M.Backlund & Thulin
- Plocama putorioides (Radcl.-Sm.) M.Backlund & Thulin
- Plocama reboudiana (Coss. & Durieu) M.Backlund & Thulin
- Plocama somaliensis (Puff) M.Backlund & Thulin
- Plocama szowitzii (DC.) M.Backlund & Thulin
- Plocama thymoides (Balf.f.) M.Backlund & Thulin
- Plocama tinctoria (Balf.f.) M.Backlund & Thulin
- Plocama trichophylla (Popov) M.Backlund & Thulin
- Plocama vassilczenkoi (Lincz.) M.Backlund & Thulin
- Plocama yemenensis (Thulin) M.Backlund & Thulin
