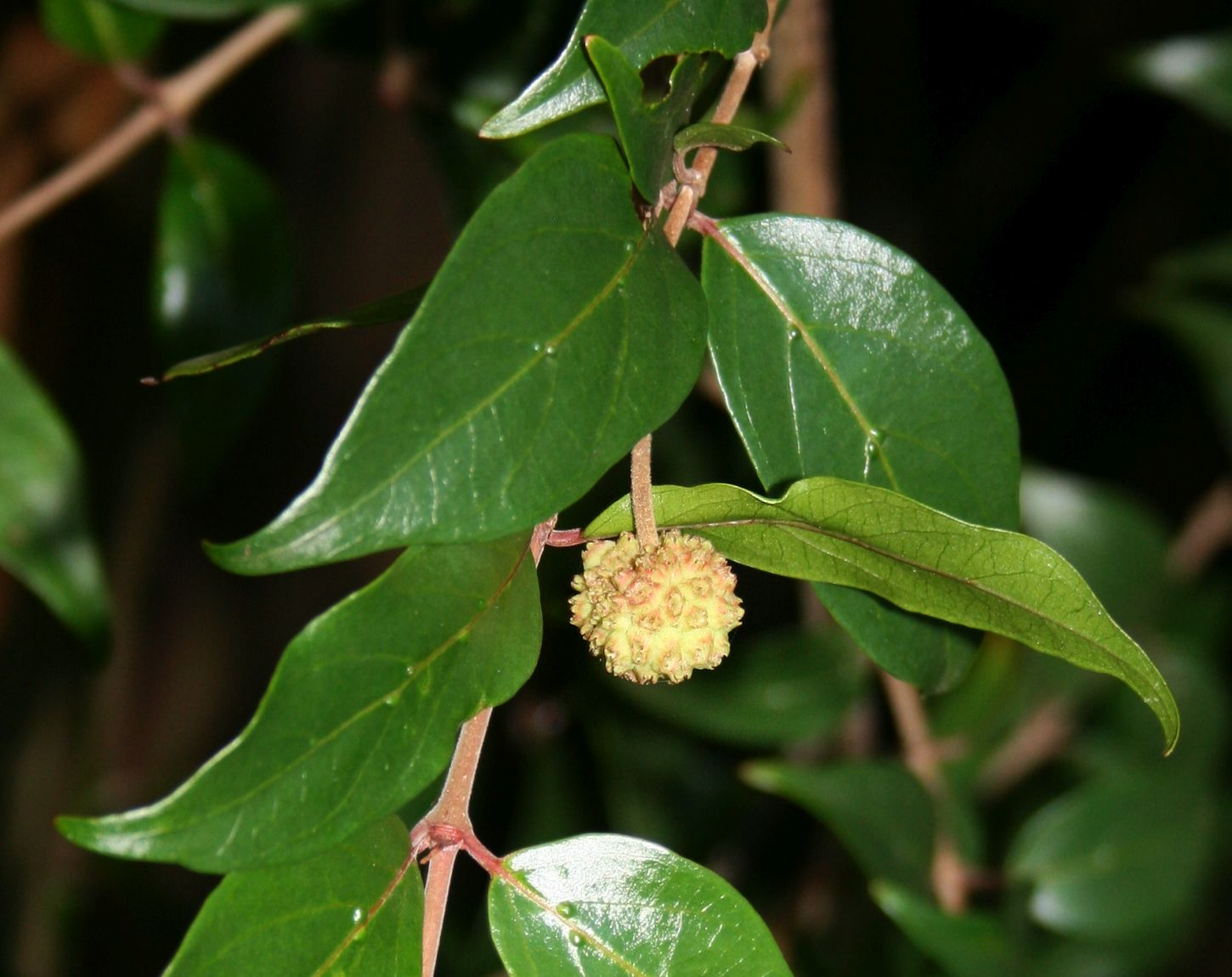

Scientific classification
- Kingdom: Plantae
- Clade: Tracheophytes
- Clade: Angiosperms
- Clade: Eudicots
- Clade: Asterids
- Order: Gentianales
- Family: Rubiaceae
- Genus: Sylvainia; M.F.Romero & R.M.Salas
- Species: S. natalensis

Binomial name
- Sylvainia natalensis (Oliv.) M.F.Romero & R.M.Salas

Synonyms
- Cephalanthus natalensis Oliv. (1881) (basionym)

= Sylvainia =

Genus of flowering plants

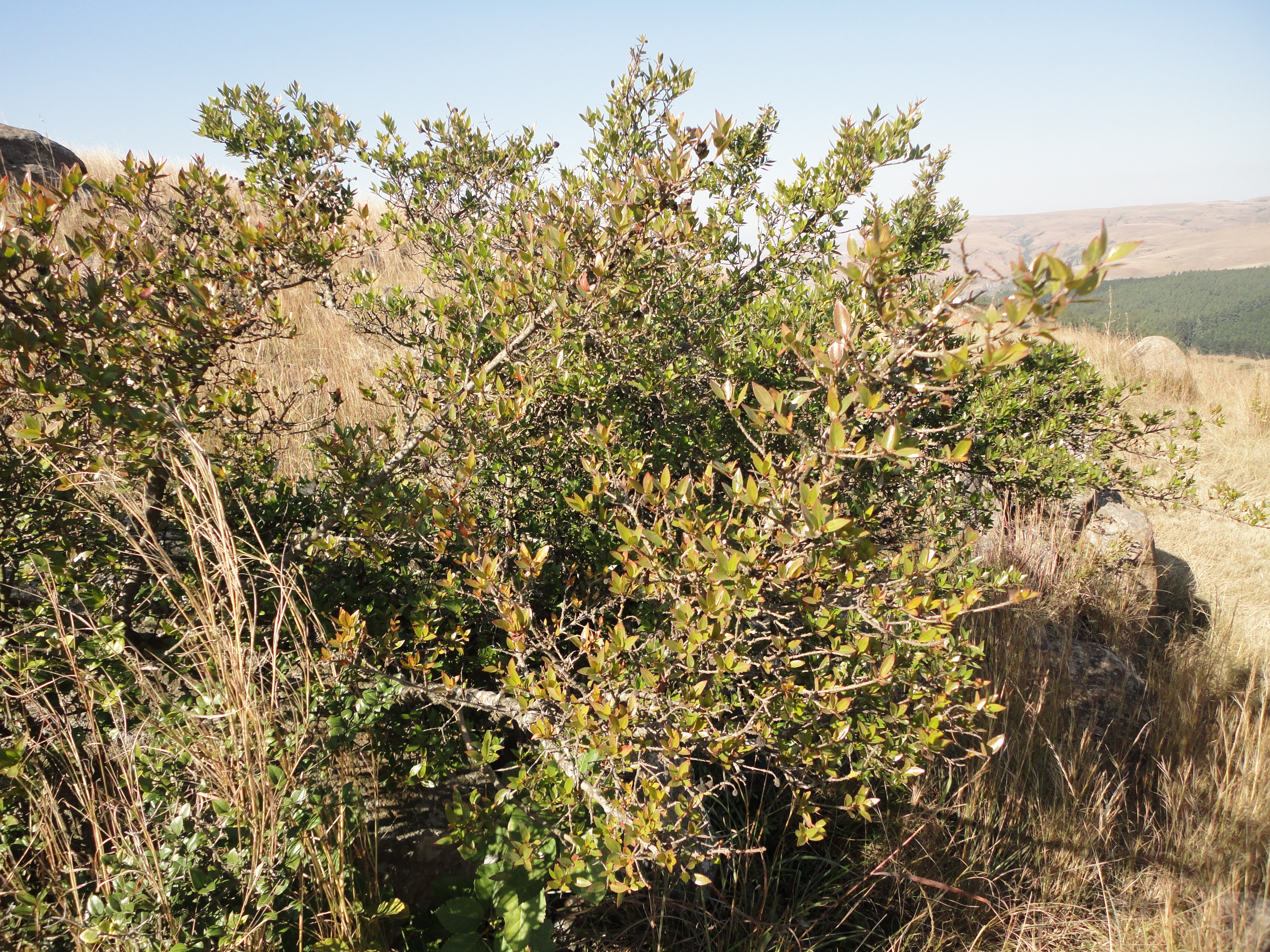
Sylvainia natalensis near Louwsburg, KwaZulu-Natal

Sylvainia is a genus of flowering plants in the family Rubiaceae. It includes a single species, Sylvainia natalensis, a scrambling shrub or tree native to eastern and southeastern Africa, ranging from southern Tanzania through Malawi, Mozambique, Zambia, and Eswatini to Lesotho, KwaZulu-Natal, and the Northern Provinces of South Africa.

The species was first described as Cephalanthus natalensis in 1881 by Daniel Oliver. In 2023 María Florencia Romero and Roberto M. Salas placed the species in the new monotypic genus Sylvainia.
