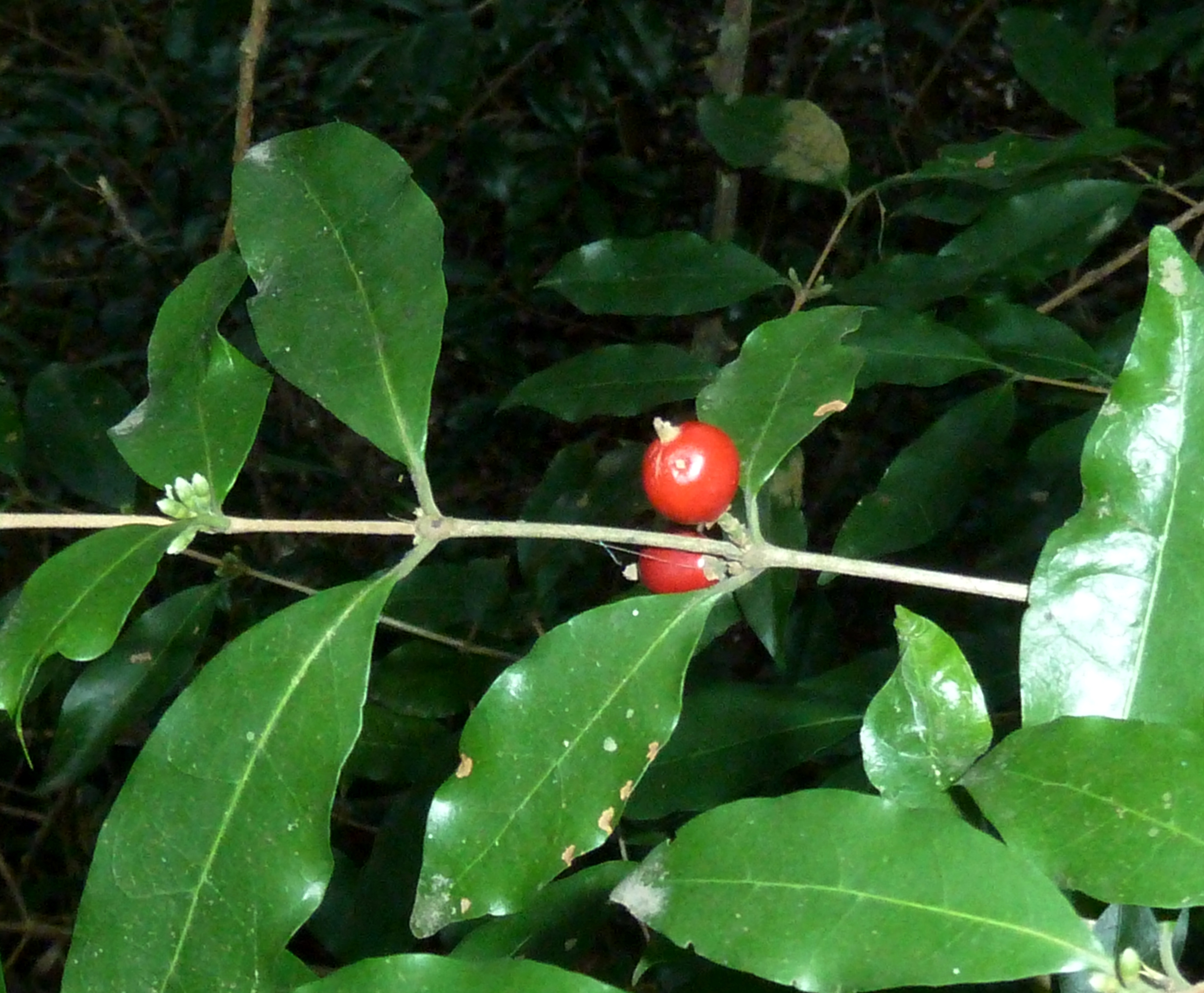
- T. capensis in forest understory
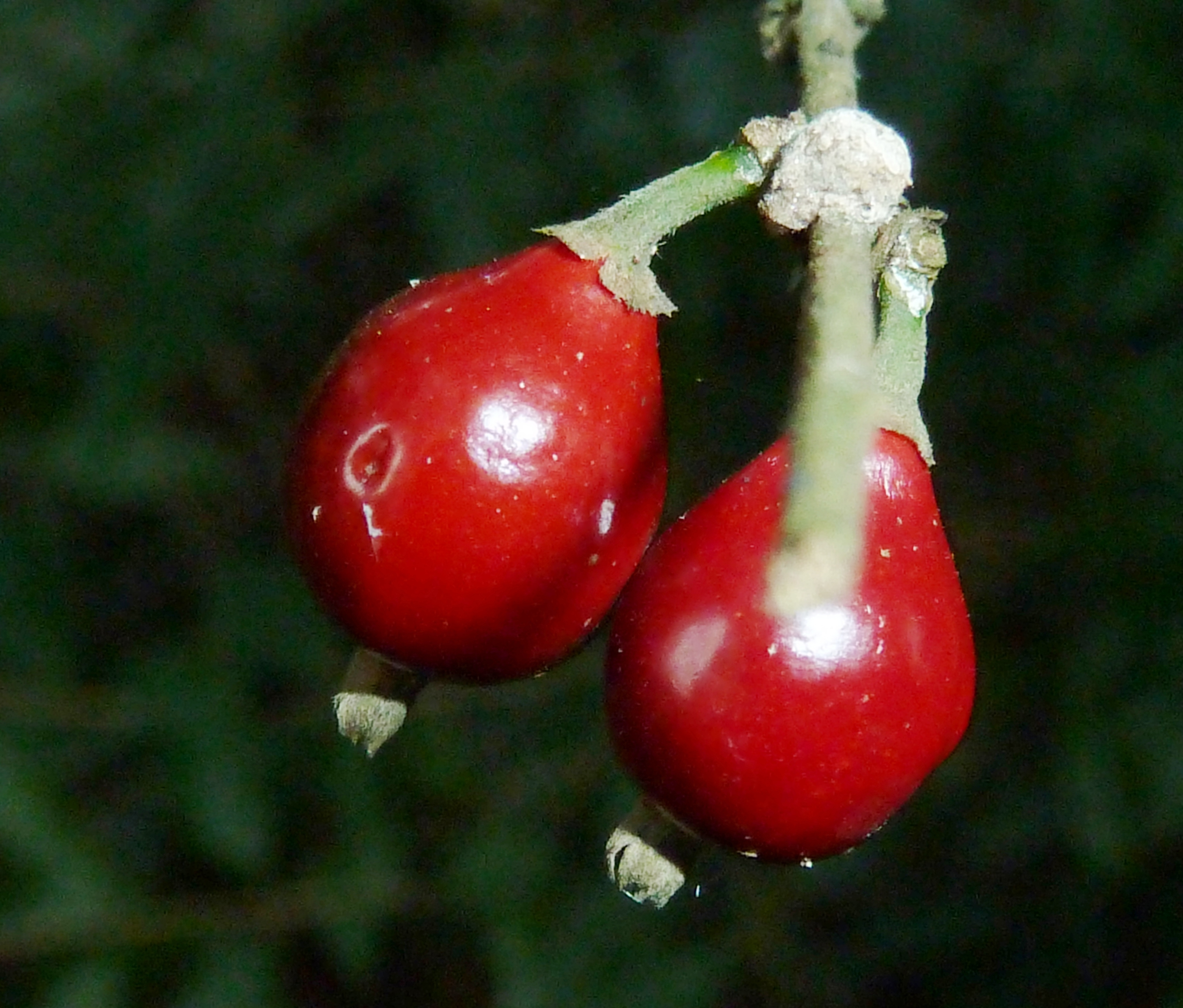
- Fruit of T. capensis

Scientific classification
- Kingdom: Plantae
- Clade: Tracheophytes
- Clade: Angiosperms
- Clade: Eudicots
- Clade: Asterids
- Order: Gentianales
- Family: Rubiaceae
- Tribe: Coffeeae
- Genus: Tricalysia; A.Rich. ex DC.

Type species
- Tricalysia angolensis A.Rich. ex DC.

Synonyms
- Bunburya Meisn. ex Hochst.; Diplocrater Hook.f.; Discocoffea A.Chev.; Eriostoma Boivin ex Baill.; Natalanthe Sond.; Neorosea N.Hallé; Probletostemon K.Schum.; Rosea Klotzsch

= Tricalysia =

Genus of plants

Tricalysia is a genus of flowering plants in the family Rubiaceae. The genus is found in tropical and southern Africa and on the islands in the Western Indian Ocean.

== Species ==
- Tricalysia achoundongiana Robbr., Sonké & Kenfack
- Tricalysia aciculiflora Robbr.
- Tricalysia acocantheroides K.Schum.
- Tricalysia allocalyx Robbr.
- Tricalysia ambrensis Ranariv. & De Block
- Tricalysia amplexicaulis Robbr.
- Tricalysia analamazaotrensis Homolle ex Ranariv. & De Block
- Tricalysia angolensis A.Rich. ex DC.
- Tricalysia anomala E.A.Bruce
- Tricalysia atherura N.Hallé
- Tricalysia bagshawei S.Moore
- Tricalysia biafrana Hiern
- Tricalysia bifida De Wild.
- Tricalysia boiviniana (Baill.) Ranariv. & De Block
- Tricalysia bridsoniana Robbr.
- Tricalysia capensis (Meisn. ex Hochst.) Sim
  - T. capensis var. galpinii (Schinz) Robbr.
- Tricalysia coriacea (Benth.) Hiern
  - T. coriacea subsp. angustifolia (J.G.García) Robbr.
  - T. coriacea subsp. coriacea
  - T. coriacea subsp. nyassae (Hiern) Bridson
- Tricalysia cryptocalyx Baker
- Tricalysia dauphinensis Ranariv. & De Block
- Tricalysia delagoensis Schinz
- Tricalysia elegans Robbr.
- Tricalysia elliottii (K.Schum.) Hutch. & Dalziel
  - T. elliottii var. centrafricana Robbr.
  - T. elliottii var. elliottii
- Tricalysia elmar Cheek
- Tricalysia fangana (N.Hallé) Robbr.
- Tricalysia faranahensis Aubrév. & Pellegr.
- Tricalysia ferorum Robbr.
- Tricalysia fililoba K.Krause
- Tricalysia gilchristii Brenan
- Tricalysia griseiflora K.Schum.
  - T. griseiflora var. benguellensis (Welw. ex Hiern) Robbr.
- Tricalysia hensii De Wild.
- Tricalysia humbertii Ranariv. & De Block
- Tricalysia idiura N.Hallé
- Tricalysia ignota Bridson
- Tricalysia jasminiflora (Klotzsch) Benth. & Hook.f. ex Hiern
  - Tricalysia jasminiflora var. jasminiflora
- Tricalysia kivuensis Robbr.
- Tricalysia landanensis R.D.Good
- Tricalysia lasiodelphys (K.Schum. & K.Krause) A.Chev.
- T. lasiodelphys subsp. anomalura (N.Hallé) Robbr.
- Tricalysia ledermannii K.Krause
- Tricalysia lejolyana Sonké & Cheek
- Tricalysia leucocarpa (Baill.) Ranariv. & De Block
- Tricalysia lineariloba Hutch.
- Tricalysia longipaniculata R.D.Good
- Tricalysia longituba De Wild.
  - T. longituba subsp. longituba
- Tricalysia lophocarpa O.Lachenaud
- Tricalysia madagascariensis (Drake ex Dubard) A.Chev.
- Tricalysia majungensis Ranariv. & De Block
- Tricalysia micrantha Hiern
- Tricalysia microphylla Hiern
- Tricalysia niamniamensis Schweinf. ex Hiern
  - T. niamniamensis subsp. niamniamensis
  - T. niamniamensis subsp. nodosa (Robbr.) Bridson
- Tricalysia obanensis Keay
- Tricalysia obovata O.Lachenaud
- Tricalysia obstetrix N.Hallé
- Tricalysia okelensis Hiern
  - T. okelensis var. okelensis
- Tricalysia oligoneura K.Schum.
- Tricalysia orientalis Ranariv. & De Block
- Tricalysia pallens Hiern
  - T. pallens var. dundensis (Cavaco) N.Hallé
  - T. pallens var. pallens
- Tricalysia pangolina N.Hallé
- Tricalysia parva Keay
- Tricalysia patentipilis K.Krause
- Tricalysia pedicellata Robbr.
- Tricalysia pedunculosa (N.Hallé) Robbr.
  - T. pedunculosa var. pilosula (N.Hallé) Robbr.
  - T. pedunculosa var. walkeriana (N.Hallé) Robbr.
- Tricalysia perrieri Homolle ex Ranariv. & De Block
- Tricalysia potamogala N.Hallé
- Tricalysia pynaertii De Wild.
- Tricalysia repens Robbr.
- Tricalysia reticulata (Benth.) Hiern
- Tricalysia revoluta Hutch.
- Tricalysia schliebenii Robbr.
- Tricalysia semidecidua Bridson
- Tricalysia soyauxii K.Schum.
- Tricalysia subsessilis K.Schum.
- Tricalysia sylvae Robbr.
- Tricalysia trachycarpa Robbr.
- Tricalysia vadensis Robbr.
- Tricalysia vanroechoudtii (Lebrun ex Van Roech.) Robbr.
- Tricalysia velutina Robbr.
- Tricalysia verdcourtiana Robbr.
- Tricalysia wernhamiana (Hutch. & Dalziel) Keay
- Tricalysia wilksii O.Lachenaud
- Tricalysia yangambiensis (N.Hallé) Robbr.
- Tricalysia zambesiaca Robbr.

== See also ==
- Empogona, formerly a subgenus of Tricalysia
- Hypobathrum of southeast Asia
- Kraussia, formerly under Tricalysia

== Literature ==
- Brenan JPM (1947). "Empogona Hook.f. and its relation to Tricalysia DC". Kew Bulletin. 2 (1): 53–63. Bibcode:1947KewBu...2...53B. doi:10.2307/4109502. JSTOR 4109502.
- Tosh J, Davis AP, Dessein S, De Block P, Huysmans S, Fay MF, Smets E, Robbrecht E (2009). "Phylogeny of Tricalysia (Rubiaceae) and its relationships with allied genera based on plastid DNA data: resurrection of the genus Empogona". Annals of the Missouri Botanical Garden. 96 (1): 194–213. doi:10.3417/2006202. S2CID 86826332.
