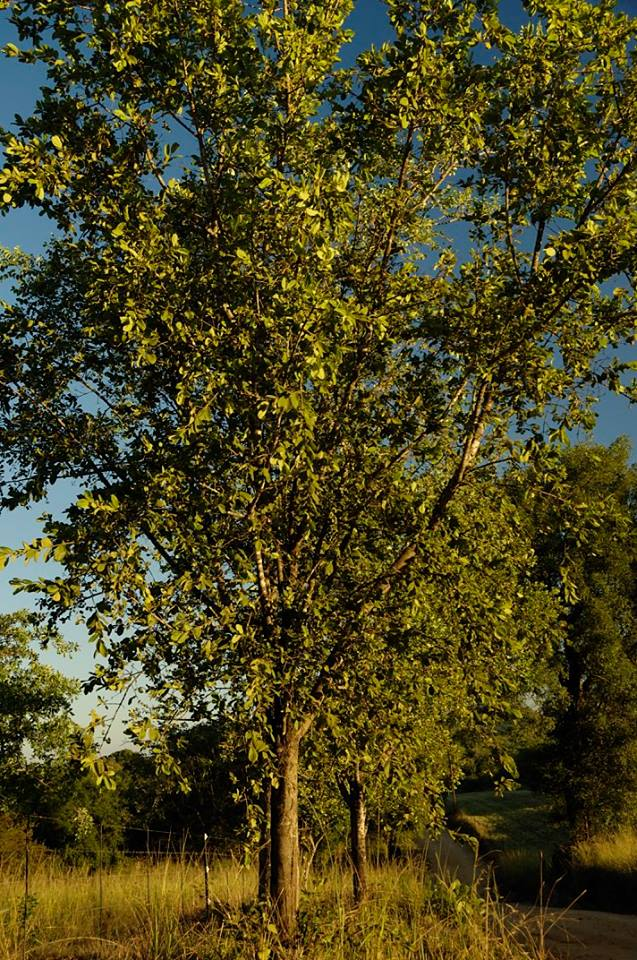
- Crossopteryx febrifuga - Northern Transvaal, South Africa

Conservation status
- Least Concern (IUCN 3.1)

Scientific classification
- Kingdom: Plantae
- Clade: Tracheophytes
- Clade: Angiosperms
- Clade: Eudicots
- Clade: Asterids
- Order: Gentianales
- Family: Rubiaceae
- Subfamily: Ixoroideae
- Tribe: Crossopterygeae
- Genus: Crossopteryx; Fenzl
- Species: C. febrifuga

Binomial name
- Crossopteryx febrifuga (Afzel. ex G.Don) Benth.

Synonyms
- Chomelia angolensis (Hiern) Kuntze; Chomelia mossambicensis (Hiern) Kuntze; Chomelia buchananii K.Schum.; Crossopteryx africana Baill.; Crossopteryx kotschyana Fenzl; Rondeletia africana T.Winterb.; Rondeletia febrifuga Afzel. ex G.Don; Tarenna angolensis Hiern; Tarenna mossambicensis Hiern

= Crossopteryx =

Genus of plants

Crossopteryx is a monotypic genus of flowering plants in the family Rubiaceae. The genus contains only one species, viz. Crossopteryx febrifuga, which is found in tropical and southern Africa.
