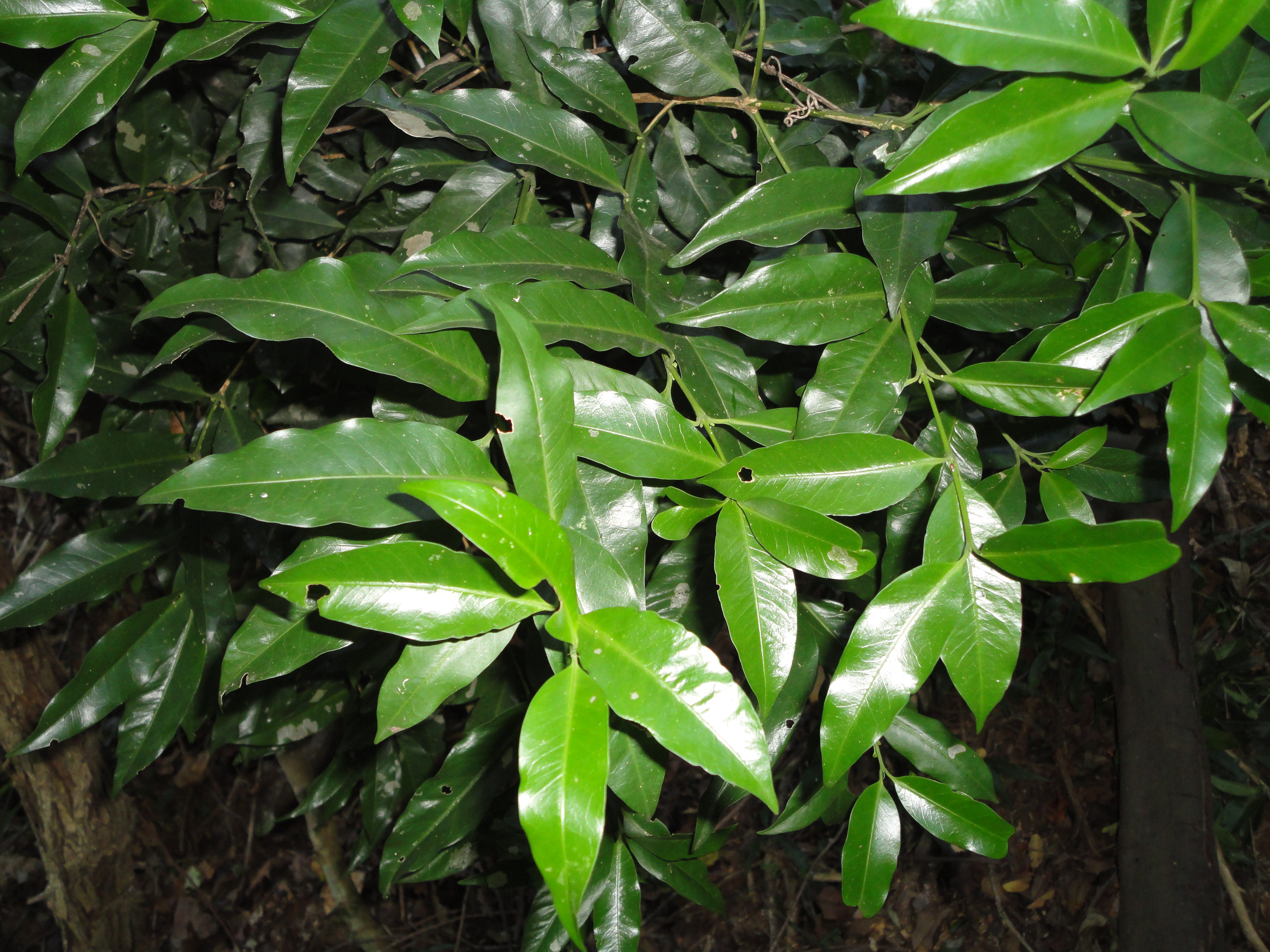
- Jackal-coffee, E. lanceolata

Scientific classification
- Kingdom: Plantae
- Clade: Tracheophytes
- Clade: Angiosperms
- Clade: Eudicots
- Clade: Asterids
- Order: Gentianales
- Family: Rubiaceae
- Subfamily: Ixoroideae
- Tribe: Coffeeae
- Genus: Empogona; Hook.f.

Type species
- Empogona kirkii Hook.f.

= Empogona =

Genus of plants

Empogona is a genus of flowering plants in the family Rubiaceae. The genus is found in tropical and southern Africa and Madagascar. It was for a time deemed a subgenus or section of Tricalysia.

== Species ==
- Empogona acidophylla (Robbr.) Tosh & Robbr.
- Empogona aequatoria (Robbr.) Tosh & Robbr.
- Empogona africana (Sim) Tosh & Robbr.
- Empogona aulacosperma (Robbr.) Tosh & Robbr.
- Empogona bequaertii (De Wild.) Tosh & Robbr.
- Empogona bracteata (Hiern) Tosh & Robbr.
- Empogona breteleri (Robbr.) Tosh & Robbr.
- Empogona buxifolia (Hiern) Tosh & Robbr.
  - Empogona buxifolia subsp. australis (Robbr.) Tosh & Robbr.
  - Empogona buxifolia subsp. buxifolia
- Empogona cacondensis (Hiern) Tosh & Robbr.
- Empogona concolor (N.Hallé) Tosh & Robbr.
- Empogona congesta (Oliv.) J.E.Burrows
- Empogona coriacea (Sond.) Tosh & Robbr.
- Empogona crepiniana (De Wild. & T.Durand) Tosh & Robbr.
- Empogona deightonii (Brenan) Tosh & Robbr.
- Empogona discolor (Brenan) Tosh & Robbr.
- Empogona filiformistipulata (De Wild.) Bremek.
  - Empogona filiformistipulata subsp. epipsila (Robbr.) Tosh & Robbr.
  - Empogona filiformistipulata subsp. filiformistipulata
- Empogona glabra (K.Schum.) Tosh & Robbr.
- Empogona gossweileri (S.Moore) Tosh & Robbr.
- Empogona jenniferae Cheek
- Empogona kirkii Hook.f.
  - Empogona kirkii subsp. junodii (Schinz) Tosh & Robbr.
  - Empogona kirkii subsp. kirkii
- Empogona lanceolata (Sond.) Tosh & Robbr.
- Empogona macrophylla (K.Schum.) Tosh & Robbr.
- Empogona maputensis (Bridson & A.E.van Wyk) Tosh & Robbr.
- Empogona ngalaensis (Robbr.) Tosh & Robbr.
- Empogona nogueirae (Robbr.) Tosh & Robbr.
- Empogona ovalifolia (Hiern) Tosh & Robbr.
  - Empogona ovalifolia var. glabrata (Oliv.) Tosh & Robbr.
  - Empogona ovalifolia var. ovalifolia
  - Empogona ovalifolia var. taylorii (S.Moore) Tosh & Robbr.
- Empogona reflexa (Hutch.) Tosh & Robbr.
  - Empogona reflexa var. ivorensis (Robbr.) Tosh & Robbr.
  - Empogona reflexa var. reflexa
- Empogona somaliensis (Robbr.) Tosh & Robbr.
- Empogona talbotii (Wernham) Tosh & Robbr.
- Empogona welwitschii (K.Schum.) Tosh & Robbr.
