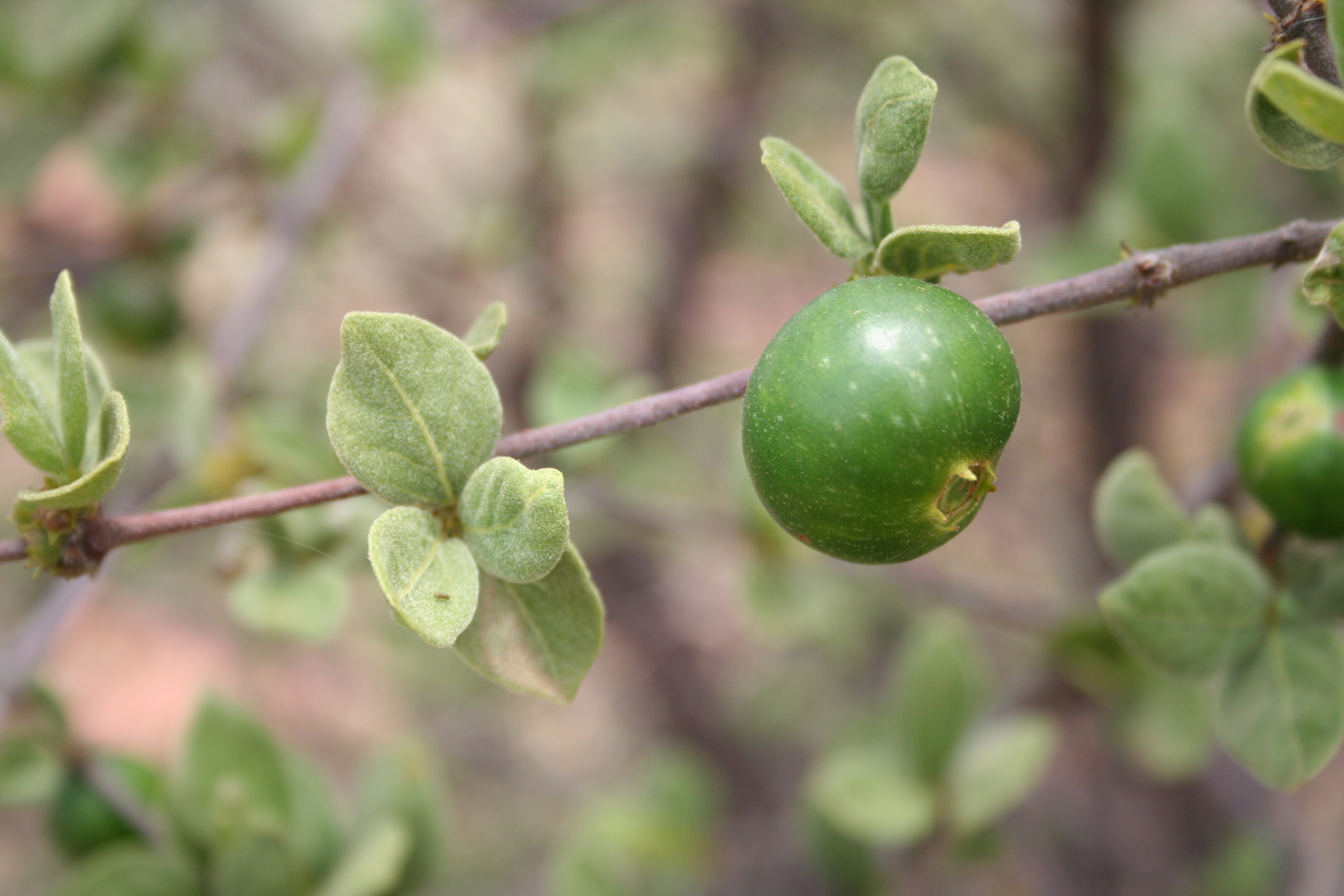
- Vangueria parvifolia Sond.

Scientific classification
- Kingdom: Plantae
- Clade: Tracheophytes
- Clade: Angiosperms
- Clade: Eudicots
- Clade: Asterids
- Order: Gentianales
- Family: Rubiaceae
- Subfamily: Dialypetalanthoideae
- Tribe: Vanguerieae
- Genus: Vangueria; Juss. (1789)

Type species
- Vangueria madagascariensis J.F.Gmel.

Synonyms
- Ancylanthos Desf.; Lagynias E.Mey. ex Robyns; Pachystigma Hochst.; Tapiphyllum Robyns; Vavanga Rohr

= Vangueria =

Genus of flowering plants

Vangueria is a genus of flowering plants in the family Rubiaceae. The genus is named for Voa vanguer, as V. madagascariensis is known in Malagasy.

== Distribution ==
The genus contains over 50 species distributed in Africa south of the Sahara with one species occurring in Madagascar (V. madagascariensis). The centre of diversity is in East Africa (Kenya, Tanzania) and they are rare in West Africa.

== Bacterial leaf symbiosis ==
Endophytic bacteria are housed in the intercellular space of the leaf mesophyll tissue. The presence of these bacteria can only be microscopically ascertained. The bacteria are identified as Burkholderia, which is a genus that is also found in the leaves of other Rubiaceae species. The hypothesis is that these endophytic bacteria provide chemical protection against insect herbivory.

== Gousiekte ==
Several Vangueria species - V. latifolia, V. pygmaea, V. thamnus - are known to cause gousiekte, a cardiotoxicosis of ruminants characterised by heart failure four to eight weeks after ingestion of certain rubiaceous plants.

== Taxonomy ==
The genus was firist described by Antoine Laurent de Jussieu in 1789.

Species in the former genus Tapiphyllum were sunk into synonymy Vangueria when a 2005 molecular phylogenetic study showed that the type species, Tapiphyllum cinerascens, is more closely related to Vangueria than to Tapiphyllum obtusifolium and Tapiphyllum velutinum, and that the latter two were not distinct from Vangueria.

== Species ==
- Vangueria agrestis (Schweinf. ex Hiern.) Lantz
- Vangueria albosetulosa (Verdc.) Lantz
- Vangueria apiculata K.Schum.
- Vangueria bicolor K.Schum.
- Vangueria bowkeri (Robyns) Lantz
- Vangueria burnettii (Tennant) Lantz
- Vangueria burttii (Verdc.) Lantz
- Vangueria chariensis A.Chev. ex Robyns
- Vangueria cinerascens (Welw. ex Hiern.) Lantz
- Vangueria cinnamomea Dinter
- Vangueria cistifolia (Welw. ex Hiern.) Lantz
- Vangueria coerulea (Robyns) Lantz
- Vangueria cyanescens Robyns
- Vangueria discolor (De Wild.) Lantz
- Vangueria domatiosa J.E.Burrows
- Vangueria dryadum S.Moore
- Vangueria esculenta S.Moore
- Vangueria ferruginea (Welw.) ined.
- Vangueria fulva (Robyns) Lantz
- Vangueria fuscosetulosa (Verdc.) Lantz
- Vangueria gillettii (Tennant) Lantz
- Vangueria glabrata K.Schum.
- Vangueria gossweileri (Robyns) Lantz
- Vangueria induta (Bullock) Lantz
- Vangueria infausta Burchell
- Vangueria kerstingii Robyns
- Vangueria lasiantha (Sond.) Sond.
- Vangueria latifolia (Sond.) Sond.
- Vangueria loranthifolia K.Schum.
- Vangueria macrocalyx Sond.
- Vangueria madagascariensis J.F.Gmel.
- Vangueria micropyren (Verdc.) Lantz
- Vangueria mollis (Robyns) Lantz
- Vangueria monteiroi (Oliv.) Lantz
- Vangueria obtusifolia K.Schum.
- Vangueria pachyantha (Robyns) Lantz
- Vangueria pallidiflora (Bullock) Lantz
- Vangueria parvifolia Sond.
- Vangueria praecox Verdc.
- Vangueria proschii Briq
- Vangueria psammophila (K.Schum.) Lantz
- Vangueria pygmaea Schltr.
- Vangueria quarrei (Robyns) Lantz
- Vangueria randii S.Moore
- Vangueria rhodesiaca (Tennant) Lantz
- Vangueria rufescens (E.A.Bruce) Lantz
- Vangueria schliebenii (Verdc.) Lantz
- Vangueria schumanniana (Robyns) Lantz
- Vangueria senegalensis Benth. & Hook.f. ex Hiern
- Vangueria silvicola O.Lachenaud
- Vangueria solitariiflora (Verdc.) Lantz
- Vangueria soutpansbergensis N.Hahn
- Vangueria thamnus (Robyns) Lantz
- Vangueria triflora (Robyns) Lantz
- Vangueria venosa (Hochst.) Sond.
- Vangueria verticillata (Robyns) Lantz
- Vangueria vestita (Robyns) ined.
- Vangueria volkensii K.Schum.
