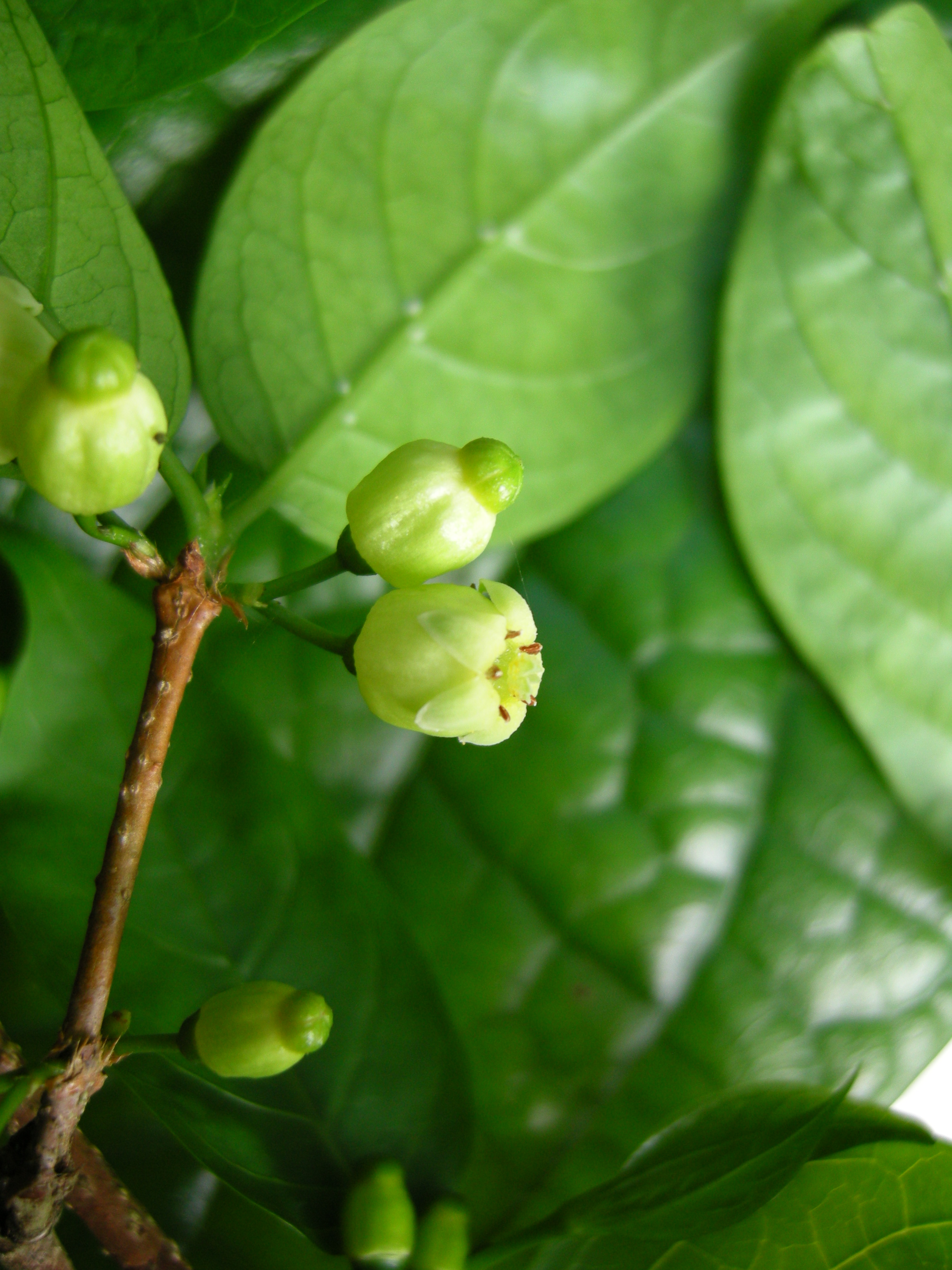
- Rytigynia uhligii in Tanzania

Scientific classification
- Kingdom: Plantae
- Clade: Tracheophytes
- Clade: Angiosperms
- Clade: Eudicots
- Clade: Asterids
- Order: Gentianales
- Family: Rubiaceae
- Subfamily: Dialypetalanthoideae
- Tribe: Vanguerieae
- Genus: Rytigynia; Blume

Type species
- Rytigynia senegalensis Blume

= Rytigynia =

Genus of flowering plants

Rytigynia is a genus of flowering plants in the family Rubiaceae. It is found in tropical and southern Africa. The genera Rytigynia and Fadogia form a strongly supported clade but neither of these genera is monophyletic.

== Distribution ==
Rytigynia is found in Tropical Africa. R. senegalensis and R. umbellulata are the two most widespread species and they are found from Senegal to Sudan to Botswana. R. celastroides has the southernmost distribution and occurs as far south as KwaZulu-Natal. However, most species are more restricted in distribution area and they are often found in either West or East Africa. Half of the species is even endemic to one country. One-third of all Rytigynia species is found in Tanzania, and many of them are endemics.

== Bacterial leaf symbiosis ==
Endophytic bacteria are housed in the intercellular space of the leaf mesophyll tissue. The presence of these bacteria can only be microscopically ascertained. The bacteria are identified as Burkholderia, which is a genus that is also found in the leaves of other Rubiaceae species. The hypothesis is that these endophytic bacteria provide chemical protection against insect herbivory.

== Species ==
- Rytigynia acuminatissima (K.Schum.) Robyns
- Rytigynia adenodonta (K.Schum.) Robyns
- Rytigynia argentea (Wernham) Robyns
- Rytigynia bagshawei (S.Moore) Robyns
- Rytigynia beniensis (De Wild.) Robyns
- Rytigynia binata (K.Schum.) Robyns
- Rytigynia bomiliensis (De Wild.) Robyns
- Rytigynia bridsoniae Verdc.
- Rytigynia bugoyensis (K.Krause) Verdc.
- Rytigynia canthioides (Benth.) Robyns
- Rytigynia caudatissima Verdc.
- Rytigynia celastroides (Baill.) Verdc.
- Rytigynia claessensii (De Wild.) Robyns
- Rytigynia claviflora Robyns
- Rytigynia congesta (K.Krause) Robyns
- Rytigynia constricta Robyns
- Rytigynia dasyothamnus (K.Schum.) Robyns
- Rytigynia decussata (K.Schum.) Robyns
- Rytigynia demeusei (De Wild.) Robyns
- Rytigynia dewevrei (De Wild. & T.Durand) Robyns
- Rytigynia dichasialis Lantz & Gereau
- Rytigynia dubiosa (De Wild.) Robyns
- Rytigynia eickii (K.Schum. & K.Krause) Bullock
- Rytigynia erythroxyloides (Baill.) A.P.Davis & Govaerst
- Rytigynia ferruginea Robyns
- Rytigynia flavida Robyns
- Rytigynia glabrifolia (De Wild.) Robyns
- Rytigynia gossweileri Robyns
- Rytigynia gracilipetiolata (De Wild.) Robyns
- Rytigynia griseovelutina Verdc.
- Rytigynia hirsutiflora Verdc.
- Rytigynia humbertii Cavaco
- Rytigynia ignobilis Verdc.
- Rytigynia kigeziensis Verdc.
- Rytigynia kiwuensis (K.Krause) Robyns
- Rytigynia krauseana Robyns
- Rytigynia laurentii (De Wild.) Robyns
- Rytigynia lecomtei Robyns
- Rytigynia leonensis (K.Schum.) Robyns
- Rytigynia lewisii Tennant
- Rytigynia liberica Robyns
- Rytigynia lichenoxenos (K.Schum.) Robyns
- Rytigynia longicaudata Verdc.
- Rytigynia longipedicellata Verdc.
- Rytigynia longituba Verdc.
- Rytigynia macrostipulata Robyns
- Rytigynia macrura Verdc.
- Rytigynia madagascariensis Homolle ex Cavaco
- Rytigynia mayumbensis Robyns
- Rytigynia membranacea (Hiern) Robyns
- Rytigynia monantha (K.Schum.) Robyns
- Rytigynia mrimaensis Verdc.
- Rytigynia mutabilis Robyns
- Rytigynia neglecta (Hiern) Robyns
- Rytigynia nigerica (S.Moore) Robyns
- Rytigynia nodulosa (K.Schum.) Robyns
- Rytigynia obscura Robyns
- Rytigynia orbicularis (K.Schum.) Robyns
- Rytigynia parvifolia Verdc.
- Rytigynia pauciflora (Schweinf. ex Hiern) R.D.Good
- Rytigynia pawekiae Verdc.
- Rytigynia pergracilis Verdc.
- Rytigynia pseudolongicaudata Verdc.
- Rytigynia pubescens Verdc.
- Rytigynia rhamnoides Robyns
- Rytigynia rubiginosa (K.Schum.) Robyns
- Rytigynia rubra Robyns
- Rytigynia ruwenzoriensis (De Wild.) Robyns
- Rytigynia saliensis Verdc.
- Rytigynia sambavensis Cavaco
- Rytigynia senegalensis Blume
- Rytigynia setosa Robyns
- Rytigynia seyrigii Cavaco
- Rytigynia squamata (De Wild.) Robyns
- Rytigynia stolzii Robyns
- Rytigynia subbiflora (Mildbr.) Robyns
- Rytigynia syringifolia (Baker) A.P.Davis & Govaerts
- Rytigynia torrei Verdc.
- Rytigynia uhligii (K.Schum. & K.Krause) Verdc.
- Rytigynia umbellulata (Hiern) Robyns
- Rytigynia verruculosa (K.Krause) Robyns
- Rytigynia xanthotricha (K.Schum.) Verdc.
