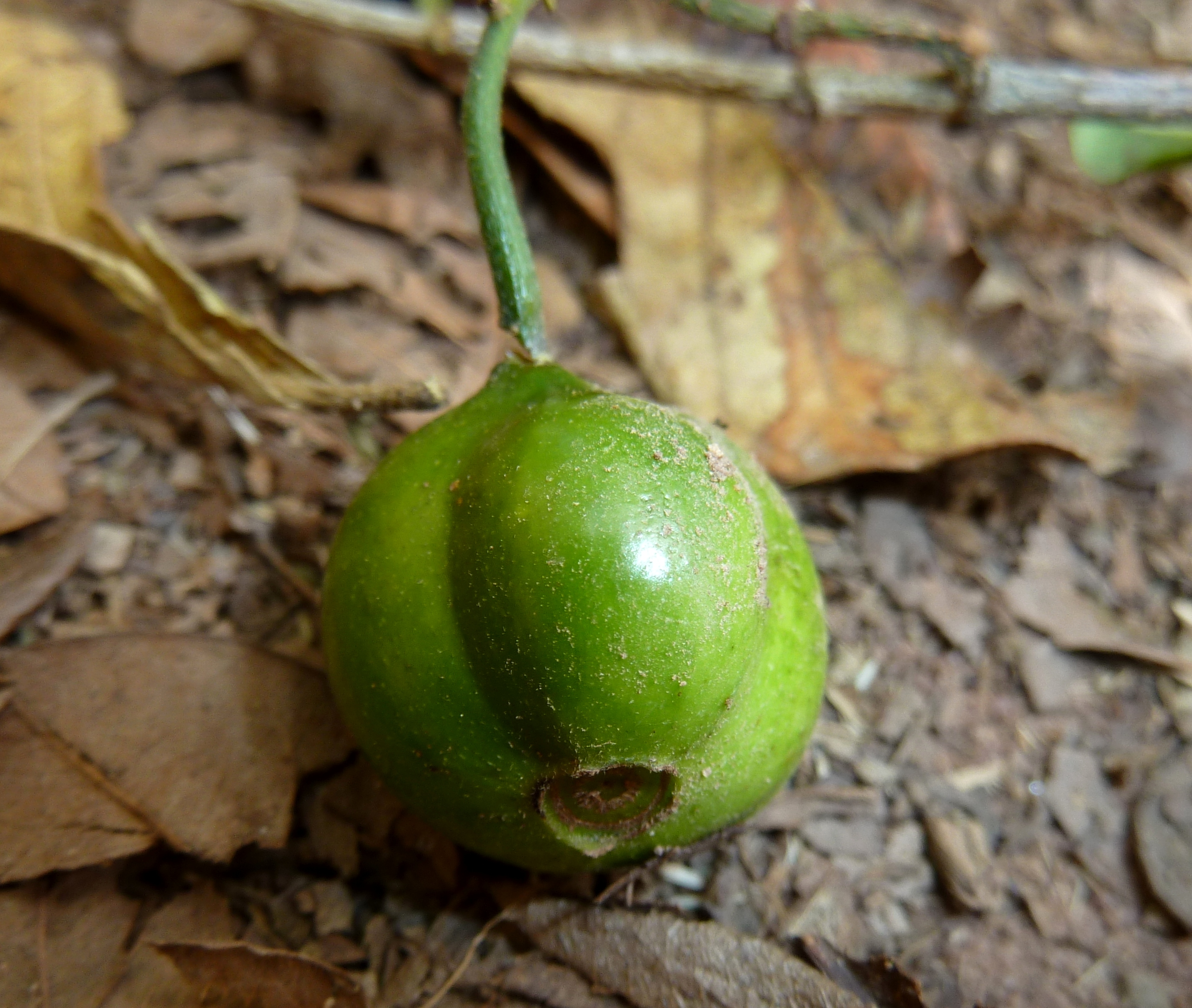
- Green fruit of Lagynas lasiantha

Scientific classification
- Kingdom: Plantae
- Clade: Tracheophytes
- Clade: Angiosperms
- Clade: Eudicots
- Clade: Asterids
- Order: Gentianales
- Family: Rubiaceae
- Subfamily: Dialypetalanthoideae
- Tribe: Vanguerieae
- Genus: Lagynias; E.Mey. ex Robyns

Type species
- Lagynias lasiantha (Sond.) Bullock

= Lagynias =

Genus of African trees

Lagynias was a genus of flowering plants in the family Rubiaceae but is no longer recognized. In 2005, it was sunk into synonymy with Vangueria, based on a phylogenetic study of DNA sequences.

== Species ==
- Lagynias dryadum (S.Moore) Robyns
- Lagynias lasiantha (Sond.) Bullock
- Lagynias monteiroi (Oliv.) Bridson
- Lagynias pallidiflora Bullock
- Lagynias rufescens (E.A.Bruce) Verdc.

== See also ==
- Cuviera
