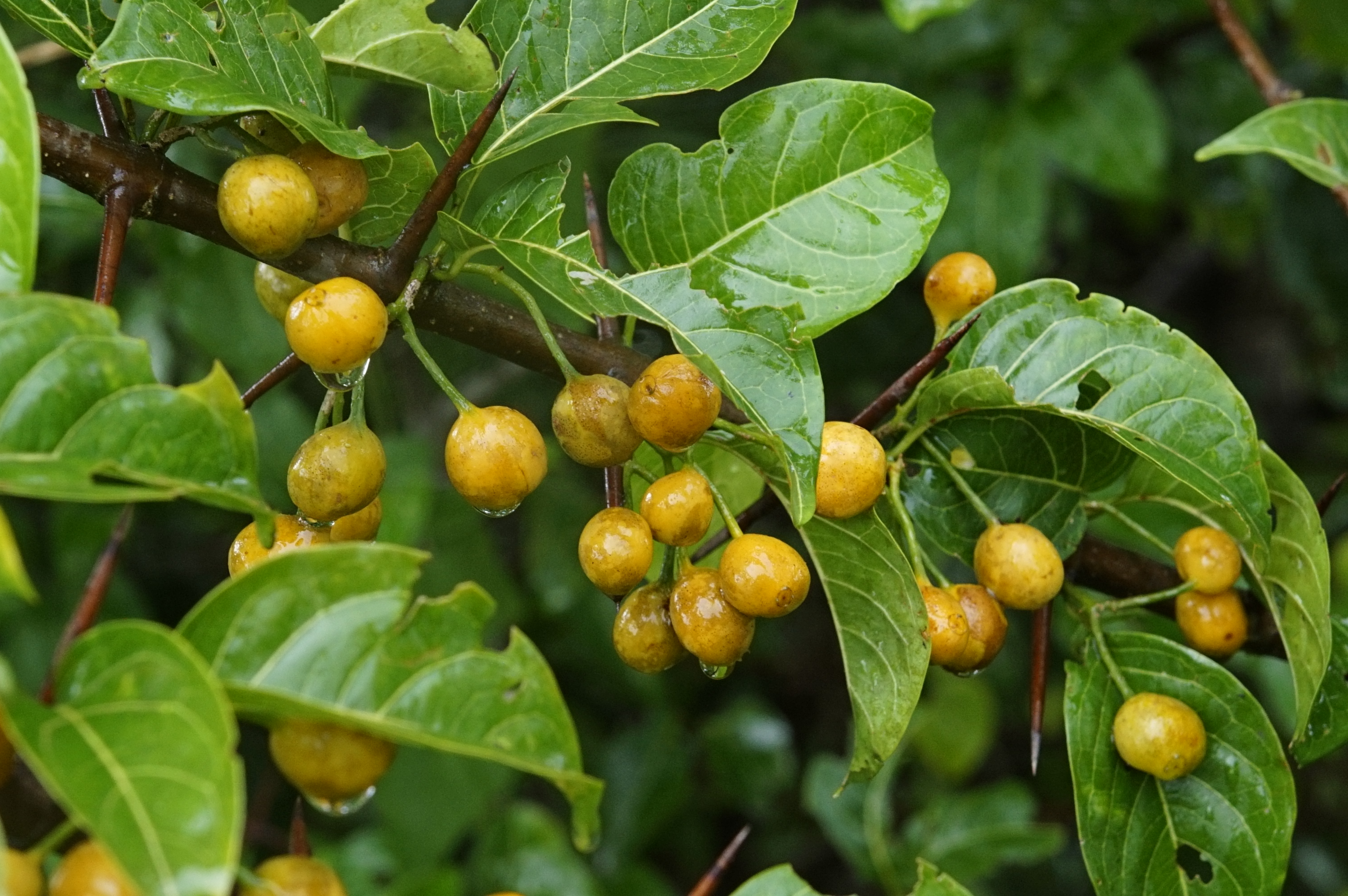
- Meyna laxiflora

Scientific classification
- Kingdom: Plantae
- Clade: Tracheophytes
- Clade: Angiosperms
- Clade: Eudicots
- Clade: Asterids
- Order: Gentianales
- Family: Rubiaceae
- Subfamily: Dialypetalanthoideae
- Tribe: Vanguerieae
- Genus: Meyna; Roxb. ex Link

Type species
- Meyna spinosa Roxb. ex Link

= Meyna =

Genus of plants

Meyna is a genus of flowering plants in the family Rubiaceae.

== Distribution ==
The genus is found in tropical Asia, except for Meyna tetraphylla that occurs in northeastern tropical Africa and the Comoros.

== Taxonomy ==
Based on morphology, Meyna has been suggested as likely candidate for inclusion in the Canthium subgenus Canthium. In 2004, a molecular phylogenetic study showed that Meyna tetraphylla is related to Canthium and the transfer to Canthium was suggested.

== Species ==
- Meyna grisea (King & Gamble) Robyns
- Meyna laxiflora Robyns
- Meyna parviflora Robyns
- Meyna peltata Robyns
- Meyna pierrei Robyns
- Meyna pubescens (Kurz) Robyns
- Meyna spinosa Roxb. ex Link
- Meyna tetraphylla (Schweinf. ex Hiern) Robyns
- Meyna velutina Robyns
