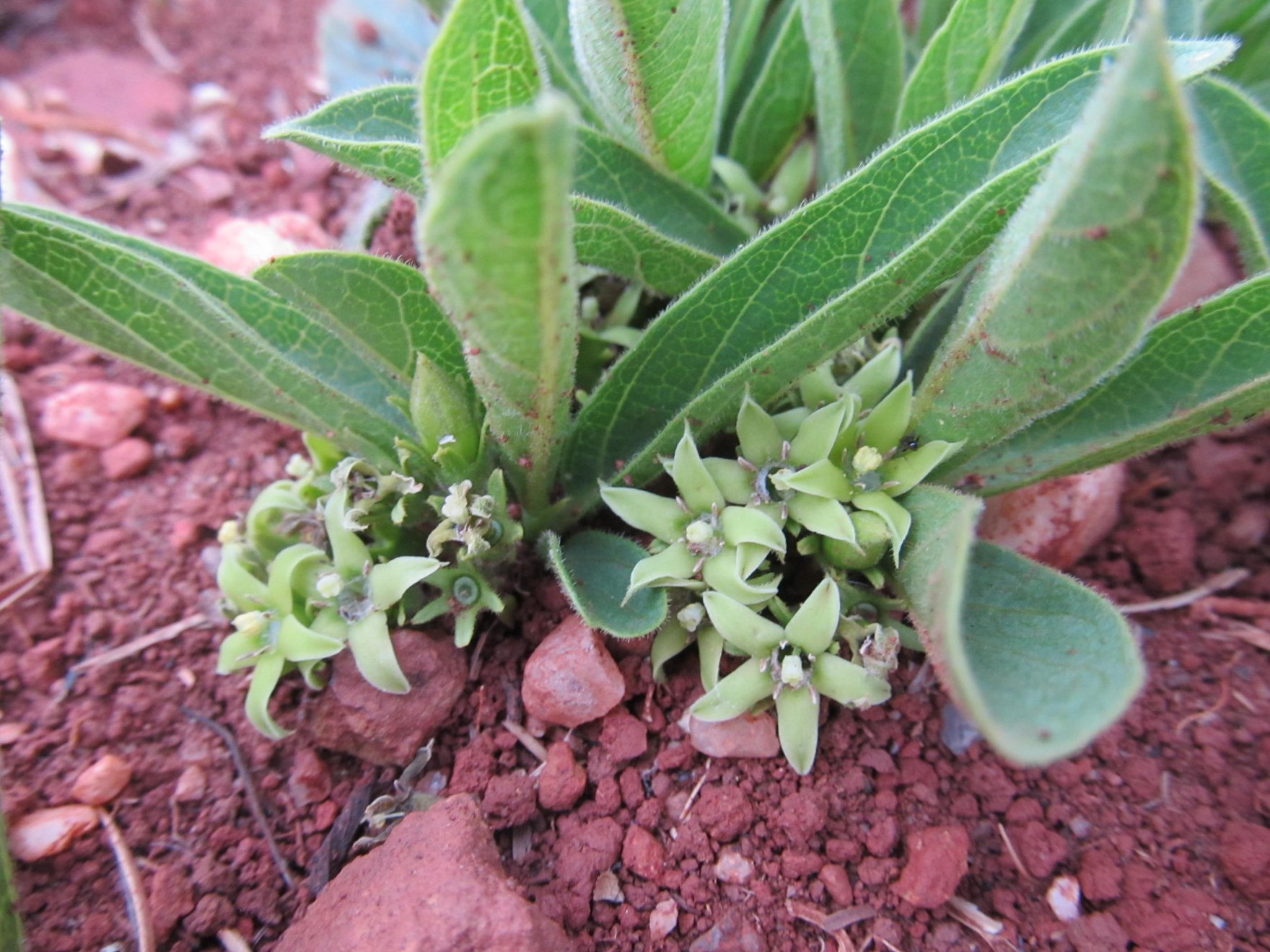
- Vangueria pygmaea Schltr-Northcliff, Johannesburg, South Africa.

Scientific classification
- Kingdom: Plantae
- Clade: Tracheophytes
- Clade: Angiosperms
- Clade: Eudicots
- Clade: Asterids
- Order: Gentianales
- Family: Rubiaceae
- Genus: Vangueria
- Species: V. pygmaea

Binomial name
- Vangueria pygmaea Schltr.

Synonyms
- Pachystigma pygmaeum (Schltr.) Robyns; Pachystigma rhodesianum (S.Moore) Robyns; Vangueria nana K.Schum. ex Robyns; Vangueria rhodesiana S.Moore; Vangueria setosa Conrath

= Vangueria pygmaea =

Species of plant

Vangueria pygmaea is a species of flowering plant in the family Rubiaceae.

== Description ==
It is a small (5–15 cm) geofrutex, usually with a long rhizome. Because of these rhizomes, the species often reproduces clonally with as a consequence that many seemingly individual plants occur together. In winter no above ground parts are present, but in spring the densely pubescent leaves appear. Inflorescences are found at ground-level and are densely setose. Flowers are 5-merous and are white. Mature fruits are yellow-brown, round and around 1.5 cm large.

This species is easily confused with the more rare Vangueria thamnus, which is identical except for the absence of an indumentum. It is also similar to and occurs together with Pygmaeothamnus zeyheri, but this species has glabrous, shiny leaves that are organized in whorls of 3 or 4.

== Distribution and habitat ==
The species is found in Malawi, Tanzania, South Africa, Eswatini, Zambia, and Zimbabwe. It grows in open grasslands, often at higher elevations with a cooler climate.

== Cultivation and use ==
It is related to the African medlar, Vangueria infausta, which is known for its edible fruits. Therefore, fruits of Vangueria pygmaea can be eaten too, however, this is not generally done.

== Gousiekte ==
The species is known to harbour endophytic Burkholderia bacteria and is known to cause gousiekte, a cardiotoxicosis of ruminants characterised by heart failure four to eight weeks after ingestion of certain rubiaceous plants.
