= Vangueria cistifolia =

Scientific classification
- Kingdom: Plantae
- Clade: Embryophytes
- Clade: Tracheophytes
- Clade: Spermatophytes
- Clade: Angiosperms
- Clade: Eudicots
- Clade: Asterids
- Order: Gentianales
- Family: Rubiaceae
- Genus: Vangueria
- Species: V. cistifolia

Binomial name
- Vangueria cistifolia (Welw. ex Hiern) Lantz

Synonyms
- Ancylanthos cistifolius Welw. ex Hiern; Tapiphyllum cistifolium (Welw. ex Hiern) Robyns

Species of plant

Vangueria cistifolia is a species of flowering plant in the family Rubiaceae. It is found in Angola and Zambia.

== Taxonomy ==
There are 2 varieties:

- V. cistifolia var. cistifolia
- V. cistifolia var. latifolia (Verdc.) Lantz
