= Vangueria cinerascens =

Scientific classification
- Kingdom: Plantae
- Clade: Tracheophytes
- Clade: Angiosperms
- Clade: Eudicots
- Clade: Asterids
- Order: Gentianales
- Family: Rubiaceae
- Genus: Vangueria
- Species: V. cinerascens

Binomial name
- Vangueria cinerascens (Welw. ex Hiern) Lantz

Synonyms
- Ancylanthos cinerascens Welw. ex Hiern; Tapiphyllum cinerascens (Welw. ex Hiern) Robyns

Species of plant

Vangueria cinerascens is a species of flowering plant in the family Rubiaceae. It is found from Tanzania to South Tropical Africa. The epithet is a Latin adjective (classical Latin cinerescens, from verb cinerescere, to turn into ashes) meaning ash-coloured, referring to the indumentum on the leaves.

== Taxonomy ==
There are 5 varieties:

- V. cinerascens var. cinerascens
- V. cinerascens var. inaequalis (Robyns) Lantz
- V. cinerascens var. laeta (Robyns) Lantz
- V. cinerascens var. laevior (K.Schum.) Lantz
- V. cinerascens var. richardsiae (Robyns) Lantz
