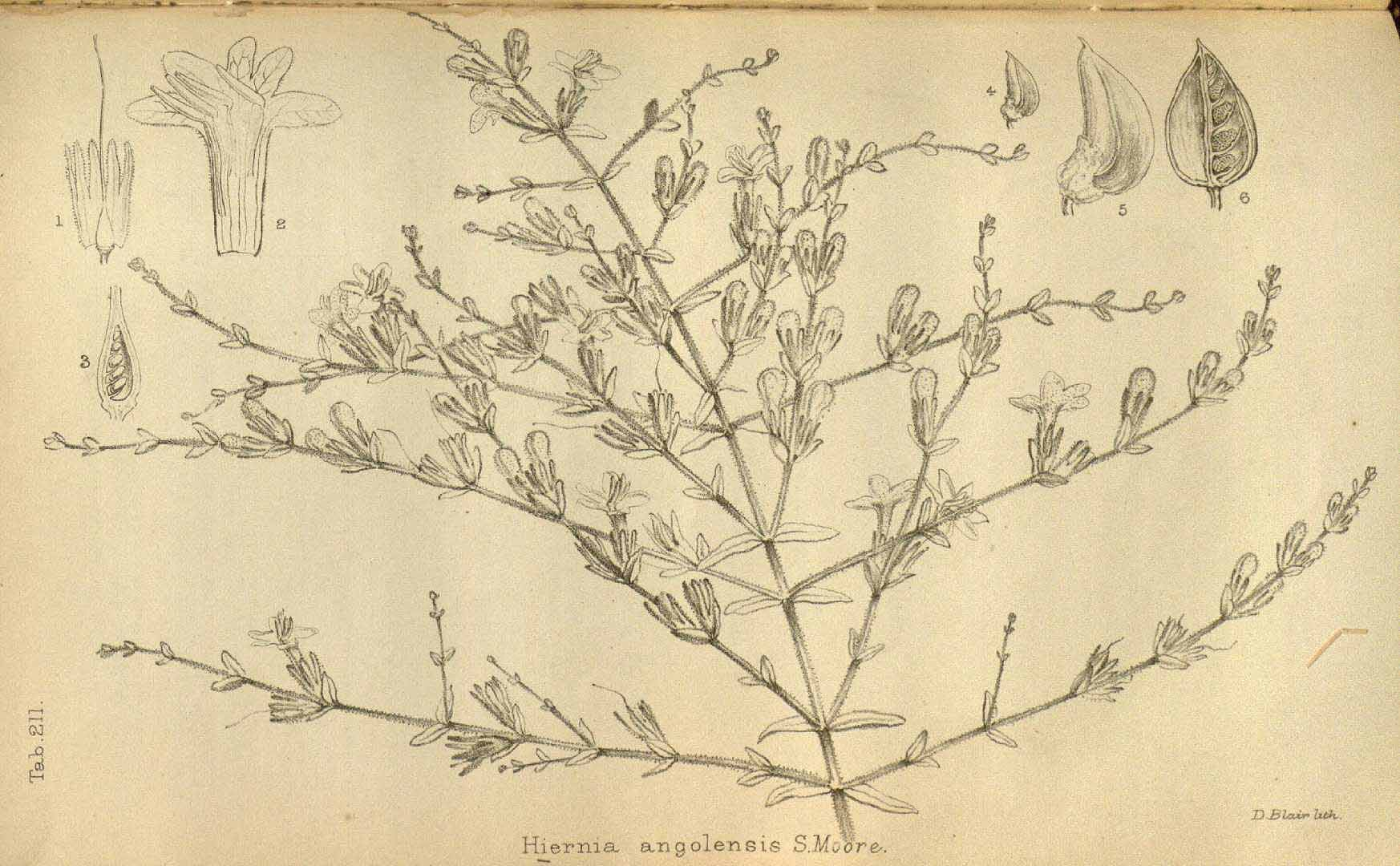

Scientific classification
- Kingdom: Plantae
- Clade: Tracheophytes
- Clade: Angiosperms
- Clade: Eudicots
- Clade: Asterids
- Order: Lamiales
- Family: Orobanchaceae
- Genus: Hiernia; S.Moore
- Species: H. angolensis

Binomial name
- Hiernia angolensis S.Moore

= Hiernia =

Genus of plants

Hiernia is a monotypic genus of flowering plants belonging to the family Orobanchaceae. It only contains one species, Hiernia angolensis.

Its native range is Angola and Namibia.

The genus name of Hiernia is in honour of William Philip Hiern (1839–1925), a British mathematician and botanist. The Latin specific epithet of angolensis refers to coming from Angola. It was first described and published in J. Bot. Vol.18 on page 196 in 1880.
