= Vangueria apiculata =

Scientific classification
- Kingdom: Plantae
- Clade: Tracheophytes
- Clade: Angiosperms
- Clade: Eudicots
- Clade: Asterids
- Order: Gentianales
- Family: Rubiaceae
- Genus: Vangueria
- Species: V. apiculata

Binomial name
- Vangueria apiculata (Verdc.) Lantz

Synonyms
- Vangueria longicalyx Robyns

Species of plant

Vangueria apiculata is a species of flowering plant in the family Rubiaceae. It is found from Ethiopia to South Tropical Africa.
