= Vangueria chariensis =

Scientific classification
- Kingdom: Plantae
- Clade: Tracheophytes
- Clade: Angiosperms
- Clade: Eudicots
- Clade: Asterids
- Order: Gentianales
- Family: Rubiaceae
- Genus: Vangueria
- Species: V. chariensis

Binomial name
- Vangueria chariensis A.Chev. ex Robyns

Species of plant

Vangueria chariensis is a species of flowering plant in the family Rubiaceae. It is endemic to southeastern Chad. It is named after the Chari River.
