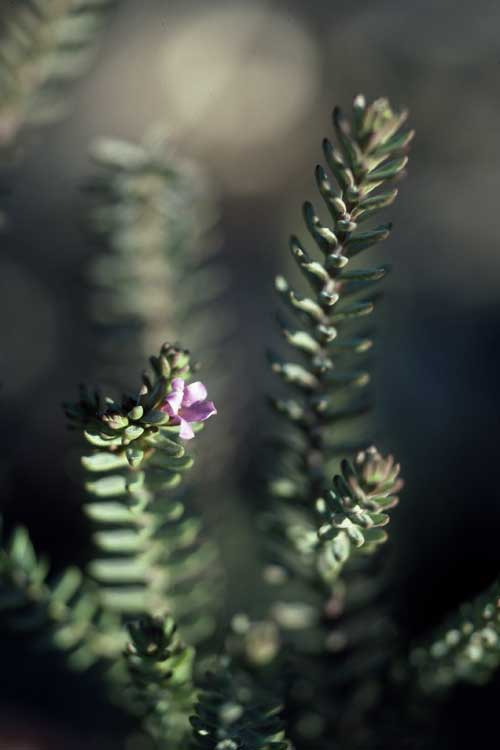

Conservation status
- Priority Three — Poorly Known Taxa (DEC)

Scientific classification
- Kingdom: Plantae
- Clade: Embryophytes
- Clade: Tracheophytes
- Clade: Spermatophytes
- Clade: Angiosperms
- Clade: Eudicots
- Clade: Asterids
- Order: Lamiales
- Family: Scrophulariaceae
- Genus: Eremophila
- Species: E. veronica

Binomial name
- Eremophila veronica (S.Moore) C.A.Gardner

Synonyms
- Eremophila elachantha Diels; Pholidia elachantha (Diels) Kraenzl.; Pholidia veronica S.Moore

= Eremophila veronica =

Veronica-like eremophila

Species of flowering plant

Eremophila veronica, commonly known as veronica-like eremophila, is a flowering plant in the figwort family, Scrophulariaceae and is endemic to Western Australia. It is a low, spreading shrub with small, crowded leaves and lilac-coloured flowers which have a short petal tube and spreading petal lobes.

== Description ==
Eremophila veronica is shrub grows to a height of between 20 and 60 cm (8 and 20 in) and spreads up to 60 cm (20 in). Its branches are densely hairy and sometimes sticky to touch near their tips. The leaves are arranged in whorls of 3 around the branches, crowded and appearing in rows along the branches. They are linear in shape, triangular in cross-section, 2.5–8 mm (0.1–0.3 in) long, 0.8–2 mm (0.03–0.08 in) wide, green to purplish in colour and slightly hairy with minute scales of dried resin.

The flowers are borne singly in leaf axils and lack a stalk. There are 5 overlapping, oblong to lance-shaped, pointed sepals which are 2–3.5 mm (0.08–0.1 in) long, glabrous on the outer surface but hairy on the inner side and edges. The petals are 5.5–7.5 mm (0.2–0.3 in) long and are joined at their lower end to form a tube and are shorter than those of most other eremophilas. The petal tube is lilac-coloured on the outside and white with lilac spots inside. The petal tube and lobes are glabrous on both surfaces except for the lower lobe which has short, flattened hairs and the inside of the tube which is filled with long, soft hairs. The 4 stamens extend slightly beyond the end of the petal tube. Flowering mainly occurs between October and December and is followed by fruits which are oval-shaped, 2–3 mm (0.08–0.1 in) long and have a hard covering.

== Taxonomy and naming ==
The species was first formally described in 1899 by Spencer Le Marchant Moore who gave it the name Pholidia veronica. The description was published in Journal of the Linnean Society, Botany. In 1931, Charles Gardner changed the name to Eremophila veronica and published the name change in Enumeratio plantarum Australiae Occidentalis. The specific epithet (veronica) presumably refers to the similarity of this species to those in the genus Veronica.

== Distribution and habitat ==
This eremophila occurs in the Coolgardie area in the Coolgardie and Murchison biogeographic regions growing in rocky clay soil in low Eucalyptus woodland.

== Conservation ==
Eremophila veronica is classified as "Priority Three" by the Western Australian Government Department of Parks and Wildlife meaning that it is poorly known and known from only a few locations but is not under imminent threat.

== Use in horticulture ==
This shrub is an ornamental plant, even when not covered with its small pale blue flowers. It can be propagated from cuttings and grows best in well-drained soil in full sun. It only needs an occasional watering during a long dry spell and is very frost tolerant.
