= Tapiphyllum =

Scientific classification
- Kingdom: Plantae
- Clade: Tracheophytes
- Clade: Angiosperms
- Clade: Eudicots
- Clade: Asterids
- Order: Gentianales
- Family: Rubiaceae
- Subfamily: Dialypetalanthoideae
- Tribe: Vanguerieae
- Genus: Tapiphyllum; Robyns

Type species
- Tapiphyllum cinerascens Robyns

Genus of plants

Tapiphyllum was a genus of flowering plants in the family Rubiaceae but is no longer recognized. In 2005, a molecular phylogenetic study showed that the type species, Tapiphyllum cinerascens, is more closely related to Vangueria than to Tapiphyllum obtusifolium and Tapiphyllum velutinum. It is not clear whether the latter two species are really separate from Vangueria. All the species of Tapiphyllum have been sunk into synonymy with Vangueria.
