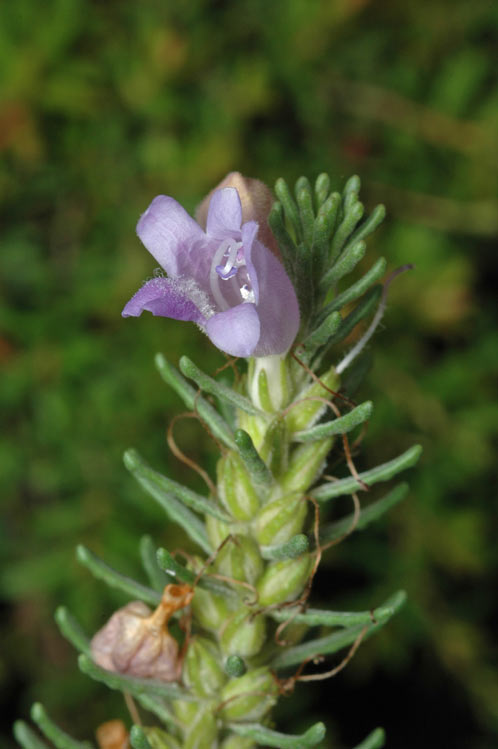

Scientific classification
- Kingdom: Plantae
- Clade: Tracheophytes
- Clade: Angiosperms
- Clade: Eudicots
- Clade: Asterids
- Order: Lamiales
- Family: Scrophulariaceae
- Genus: Eremophila
- Species: E. caerulea

Binomial name
- Eremophila caerulea (S.Moore) Diels

= Eremophila caerulea =

Spotted eremophila

Species of flowering plant

Eremophila caerulea, commonly known as spotted eremophila, is a flowering plant in the figwort family, Scrophulariaceae and is endemic to the south-west of Western Australia. It is a low, compact, spreading shrub with narrow, warty, cylindrical leaves and blue to purple flowers.

== Description ==
Eremophila caerulea is a shrub with dense foliage, many tangled branches and a strong smell of camphor and which grows to a height of 0.3–0.6 m (1–2 ft) and a spread of up to 0.7 m (2 ft). The leaves are arranged in whorls of 3 or 4 and are usually 4–10 mm (0.2–0.4 in) long and about 1 mm (0.04 in) wide. They are linear in shape and almost circular in cross-section, although there are many raised warty lumps on the surface.

The flowers are borne singly in leaf axils and lack a stalk. There are 5 linear or lance-shaped, green sepals which are 3–5.5 mm (0.1–0.2 in) long and hairy. The petals are 9–14 mm (0.4–0.6 in) long and joined at their lower end to form a tube. The tube is a shade of blue to purple on the outside and white with purple spots inside and there are scattered hairs on the outside The inside of the tube is filled with spidery hairs and there are hairs on the lowers petal lobe. There are 4 stamens, two of which extend slightly beyond the petals while the other two are enclosed in the petal tube. Flowering mostly occurs from September to November and is followed by fruits which are dry, oblong to almost spherical and are 2.5–4 mm (0.1–0.2 in) long.

== Taxonomy and naming ==
The species was first formally described by Spencer Moore in 1899 as Pholidia caerulea and the description was published in Journal of the Linnean Society, Botany. In 1904 Ludwig Diels and Ernst Georg Pritzel changed the name to Eremophila caerulea. The specific epithet (caerulea) is a Latin word meaning "dark blue", referring to the colour of the petals.

There are two subspecies:

- E. caerulea (S.Moore) Diels subsp. caerulea, which has sparsely hairy leaves and lance-shaped sepals and which occurs between Kalgoorlie, Norseman and Bruce Rock;
- E. caerulea subsp. merrallii Chinnock , commonly known as Bruce Rock eremophila, which has densely hairy leaves and linear sepals and which occurs between the Hunt Range, Southern Cross and Bruce Rock.

The epithet merrallii honours Edwin Merrall, a gold prospector, who first collected this plant.

== Distribution and habitat ==
Eremophila caerulea occurs to the west of Kalgoorlie in the Coolgardie biogeographic region where it grows in red sand or stony clay in woodland or mallee on undulating plains.

== Conservation status ==
Eremophila caerulea subsp. caerulea is classified as "not threatened" but Eremophila caerulea subsp. merrallii is classified as "Priority Four" by the Western Australian Government Department of Parks and Wildlife meaning that is rare but not currently under threat.

== Use in horticulture ==
Its compact form and unusual leaves make this an ideal garden shrub and is popular in many gardens. It is easily propagated from cuttings although these make take up to 3 months to strike, even in warm weather. It will grow in most soils, although more slowly in clay and will grow in full sun or partial shade. It rarely needs pruning and will survive heavy frosts.
