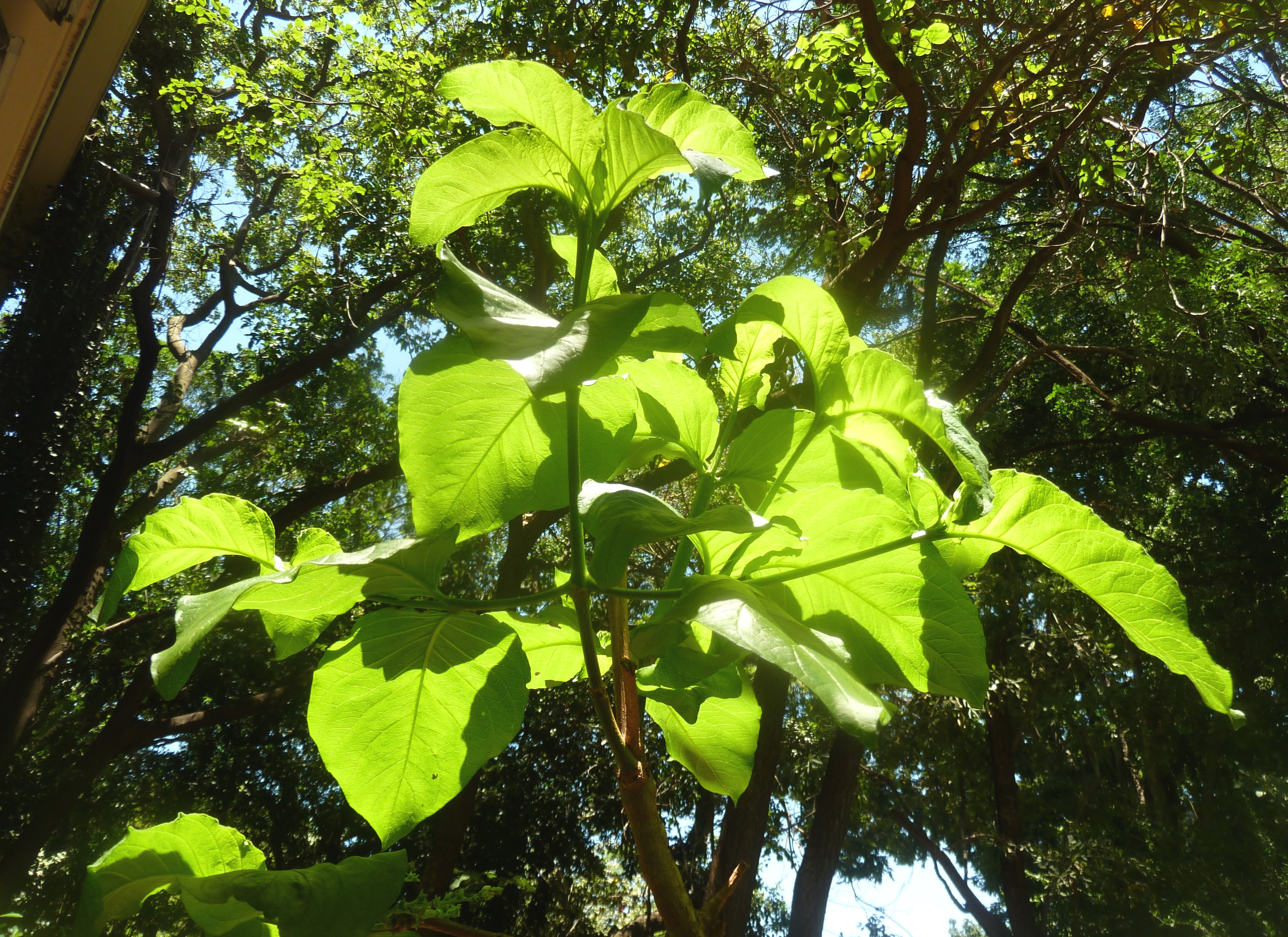

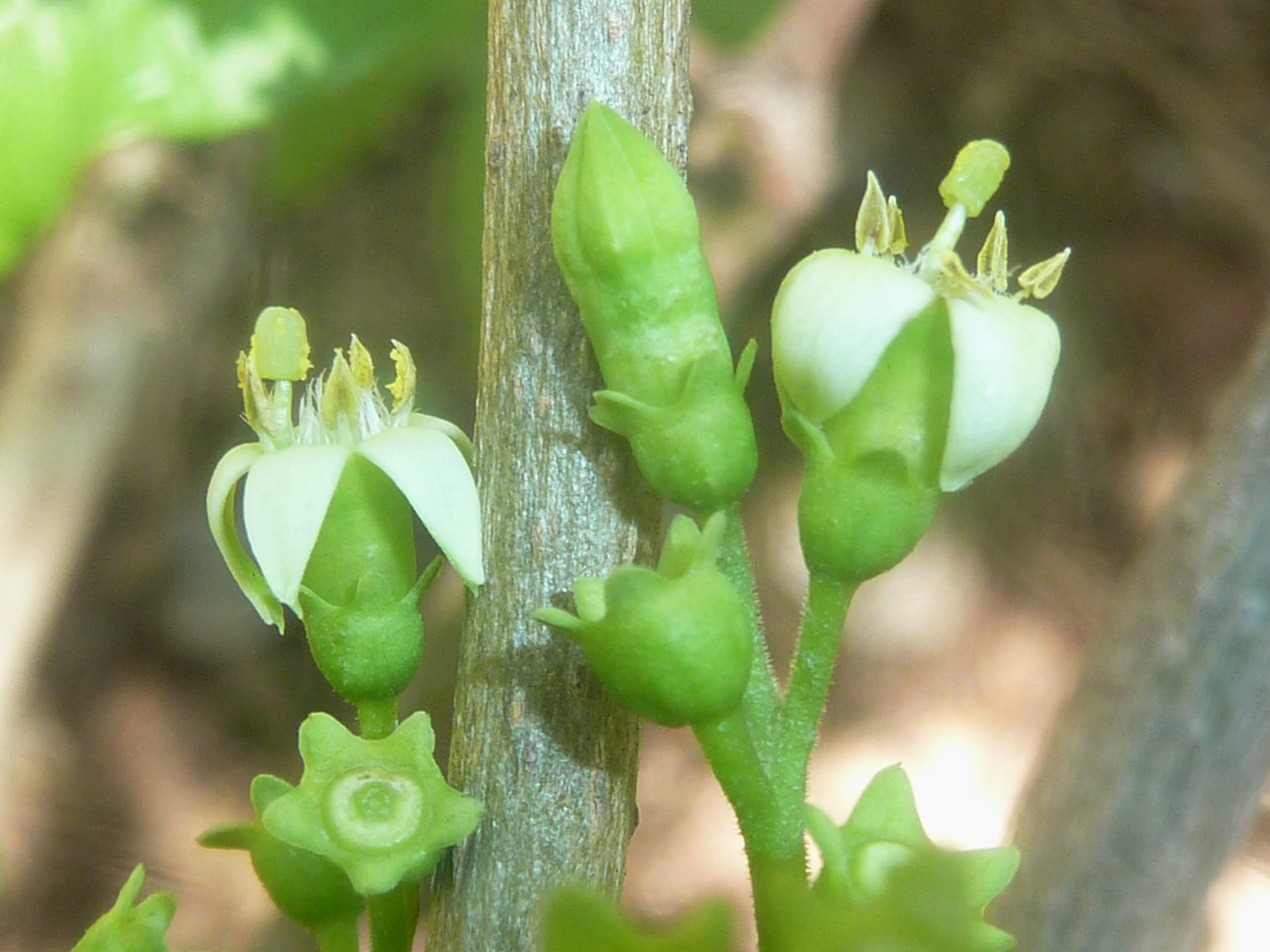

Scientific classification
- Kingdom: Plantae
- Clade: Tracheophytes
- Clade: Angiosperms
- Clade: Eudicots
- Clade: Asterids
- Order: Gentianales
- Family: Rubiaceae
- Genus: Vangueria
- Species: V. cyanescens

Binomial name
- Vangueria cyanescens Robyns

= Vangueria cyanescens =

Species of plant

Vangueria cyanescens, the Kalahari wild-medlar, is a species of flowering plant in the family Rubiaceae. It is found in Angola, Botswana, Namibia, and Zambia. The epithet is a Latin adjective meaning dark or deep blue, referring to the colour of the leaves, especially after drying.
