= Vangueria discolor =

Scientific classification
- Kingdom: Plantae
- Clade: Tracheophytes
- Clade: Angiosperms
- Clade: Eudicots
- Clade: Asterids
- Order: Gentianales
- Family: Rubiaceae
- Genus: Vangueria
- Species: V. discolor

Binomial name
- Vangueria discolor (De Wild.) Lantz

Synonyms
- Fadogia discolor De Wild.; Tapiphyllum confertiflorum Robyns; Tapiphyllum discolor (De Wild.) Robyns; Tapiphyllum fadogia Bullock; Tapiphyllum grandiflorum Robyns; Tapiphyllum herbaceum Robyns; Tapiphyllum oblongifolium Robyns

Species of plant

Vangueria discolor is a species of flowering plant in the family Rubiaceae. It is found in Burundi, DR Congo, Tanzania, and Zambia. The epithet refers to the difference in colour between the upper and the lower part of the leaves, which is especially visible after drying.
