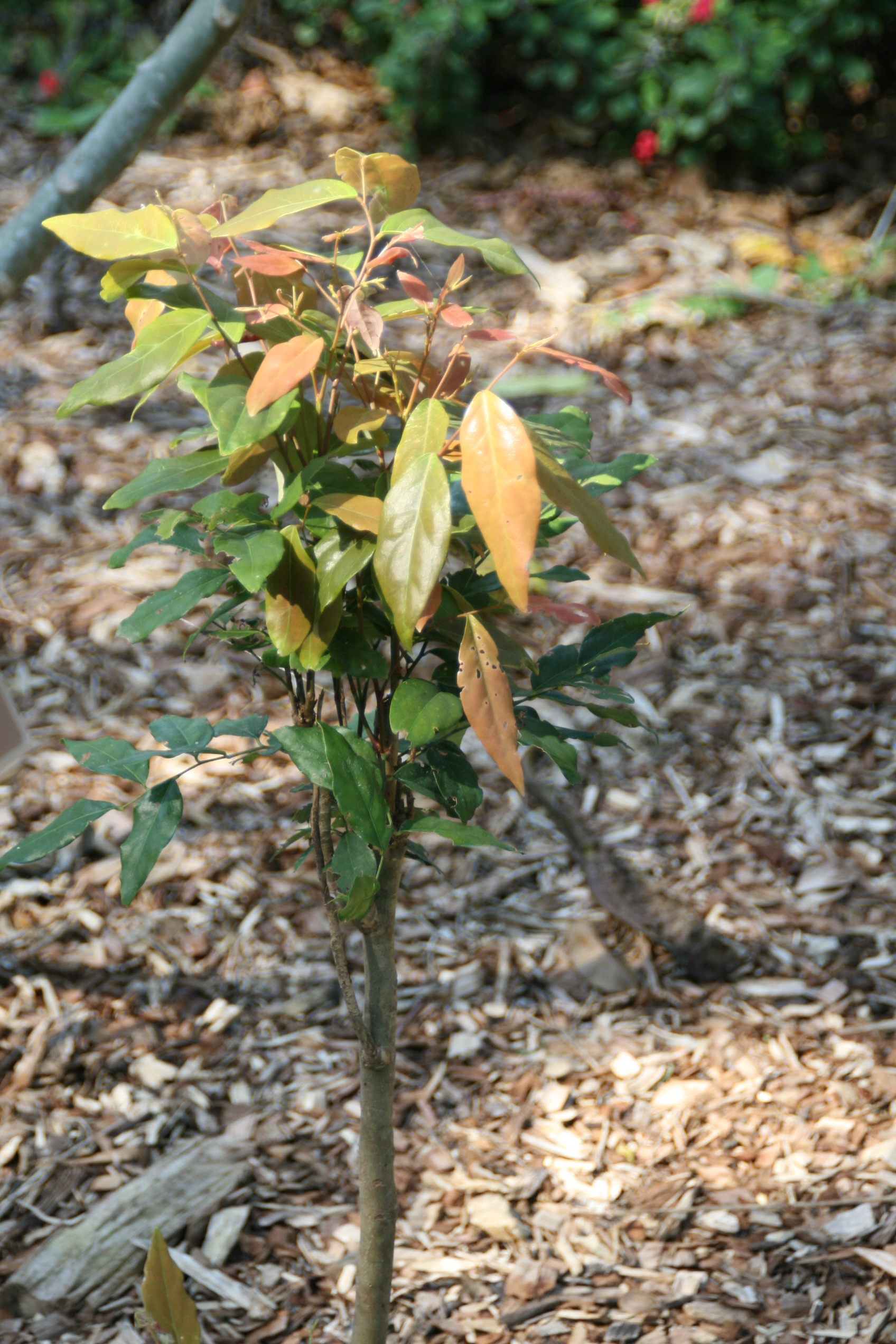

Conservation status
- Least Concern (IUCN 3.1)

Scientific classification
- Kingdom: Plantae
- Clade: Tracheophytes
- Clade: Angiosperms
- Clade: Eudicots
- Clade: Rosids
- Order: Malpighiales
- Family: Phyllanthaceae
- Genus: Phyllanthus
- Species: P. cuscutiflorus

Binomial name
- Phyllanthus cuscutiflorus S.Moore

Synonyms
- Dendrophyllanthus cuscutiflorus (S.Moore) R.W.Bouman

= Phyllanthus cuscutiflorus =

Species of flowering plant

Phyllanthus cuscutiflorus is a species of flowering plant in the family Phyllanthaceae. It is a shrub or tree native to native to eastern New Guinea in Papua New Guinea and to Queensland in Australia.
