= Grevillea rubicunda =

Scientific classification
- Kingdom: Plantae
- Clade: Embryophytes
- Clade: Tracheophytes
- Clade: Angiosperms
- Clade: Eudicots
- Order: Proteales
- Family: Proteaceae
- Genus: Grevillea
- Species: G. rubicunda

Binomial name
- Grevillea rubicunda S.Moore

Species of plant endemic to Australia

Grevillea rubicunda is a species of flowering plant in the family Proteaceae and is endemic to the Northern Territory in Australia. It is an erect, spreading shrub with divided leaves with 15 to 25 lobes, and white flowers.

== Description ==
Grevillea rubicunda is an erect, spreading shrub that typically grows to a height of 0.6–2 m (2 ft 0 in – 6 ft 7 in). Its leaves are pinnatipartite to almost pinnatisect, 120–200 mm (4.7–7.9 in) long with 15 to 25 lobes, 40–100 mm (1.6–3.9 in) long and 1.2–2.0 mm (0.047–0.079 in) wide. The flowers are arranged in erect, conical to cylindrical groups on a rusty-hairy rachis 40–200 mm (1.6–7.9 in) long, the oldest flowers at the base. The flowers are hairy on the outside, greenish at first, later white, the pistil 8–11 mm (0.31–0.43 in) long. Flowering occurs from December to May and the fruit is a shaggy-hairy follicle 8–10 mm (0.31–0.39 in) long.

== Taxonomy ==
Grevillea rubicunda was first formally described in 1920 by Spencer Le Marchant Moore in the Journal of the Linnean Society, Botany from specimens collected by Ludwig Leichhardt near the "table-land of the South Alligator". The specific epithet (rubicunda) means "red" or "ruddy".

== Distribution and habitat ==
Grevillea rubicunda occurs on the Kakadu escarpment of western Arnhem Land in the tropical Top End of Australia's Northern Territory. It grows beside creeks on sandy soils on sandstone substrates.
