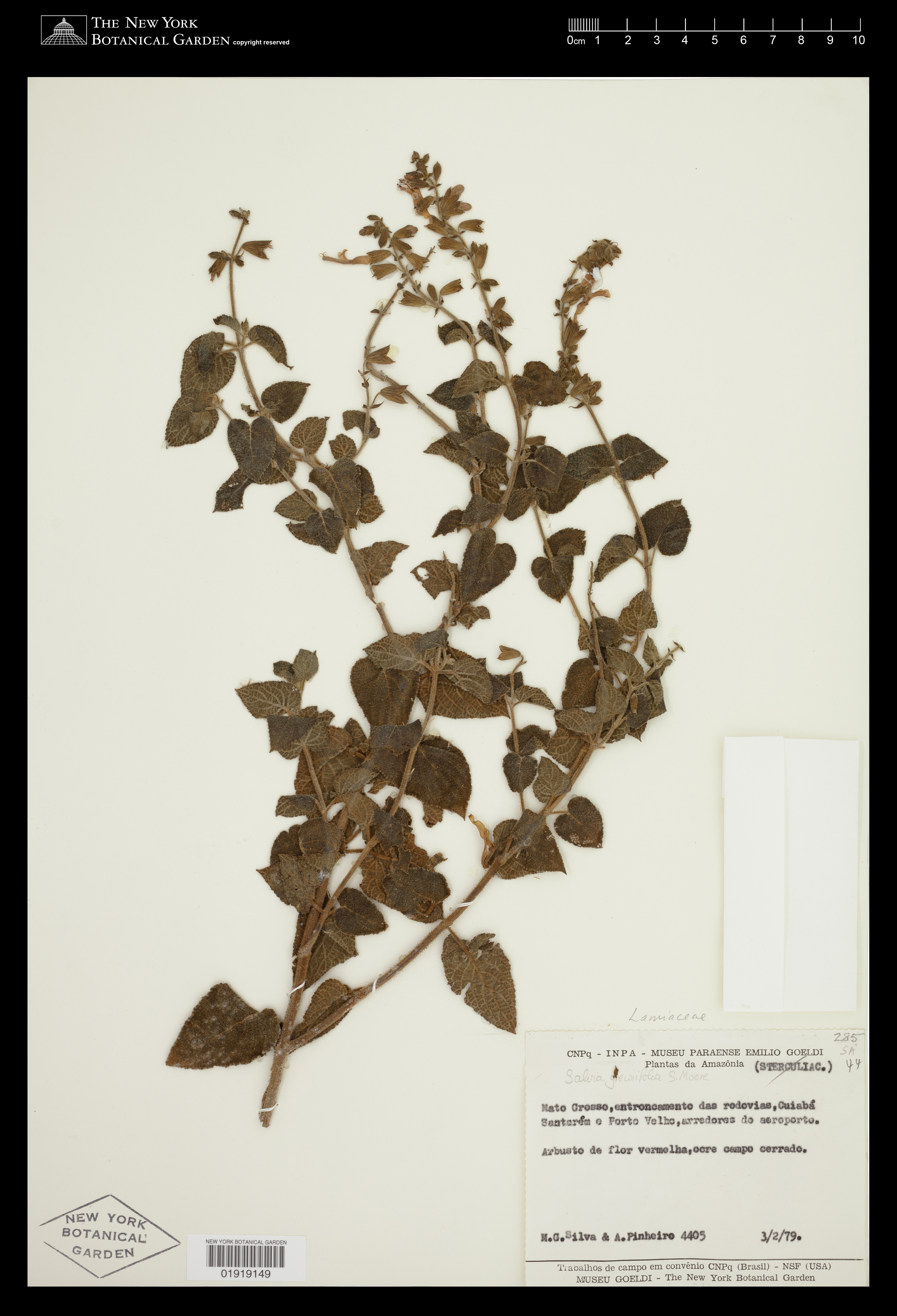

Scientific classification
- Kingdom: Plantae
- Clade: Tracheophytes
- Clade: Angiosperms
- Clade: Eudicots
- Clade: Asterids
- Order: Lamiales
- Family: Lamiaceae
- Genus: Salvia
- Species: S. grewiifolia

Binomial name
- Salvia grewiifolia S.Moore

= Salvia grewiifolia =

Species of shrub

Salvia grewiifolia is an undershrub that is native to Bolivia and Brazil, growing in open dry forest and clearings.

S. grewiifolia grows .5 to 1.5 metres (1.6 to 4.9 ft) high, with petiolate ovate leaves that are 2 to 8 cm (0.79 to 3.15 in) by .5 to 1.5 cm (0.20 to 0.59 in). The inflorescence of short terminal racemes grows 5 to 30 cm (2.0 to 11.8 in) long, with 4-6-flowered verticillasters and a red corolla that is 1.8 to 3 cm (0.71 to 1.18 in) long.
