= Vavanga =

Scientific classification
- Kingdom: Plantae
- Clade: Tracheophytes
- Clade: Angiosperms
- Clade: Eudicots
- Clade: Asterids
- Order: Gentianales
- Family: Rubiaceae
- Subfamily: Dialypetalanthoideae
- Tribe: Vanguerieae
- Genus: Vavanga; Rohr

Type species
- Vavanga chinensis Rohr

Genus of plants

Vavanga was a genus of flowering plants in the family Rubiaceae but is no longer recognized. It was originally described by Julius von Röhr in 1792 to accommodate the species V. chinensis. A second species, V. edulis, was added by Martin Vahl. The species have been sunk into synonymy with Vangueria.
