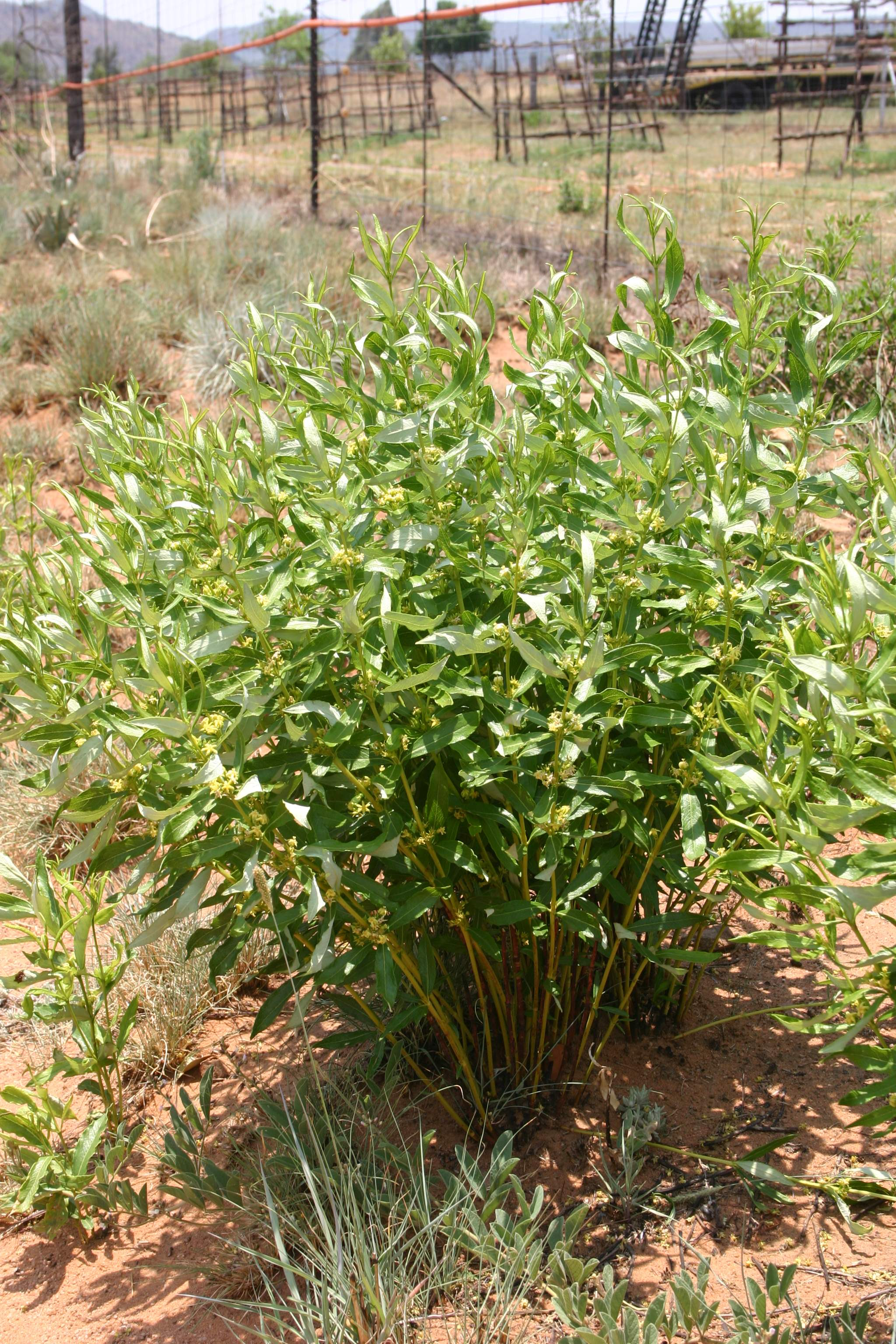

Scientific classification
- Kingdom: Plantae
- Clade: Tracheophytes
- Clade: Angiosperms
- Clade: Eudicots
- Clade: Asterids
- Order: Gentianales
- Family: Rubiaceae
- Genus: Fadogia
- Species: F. homblei

Binomial name
- Fadogia homblei De Wild.

Synonyms
- Fadogia monticola Robyns; Fadogia oleoides Robyns

= Fadogia homblei =

Perennial sub-Saharan shrublet

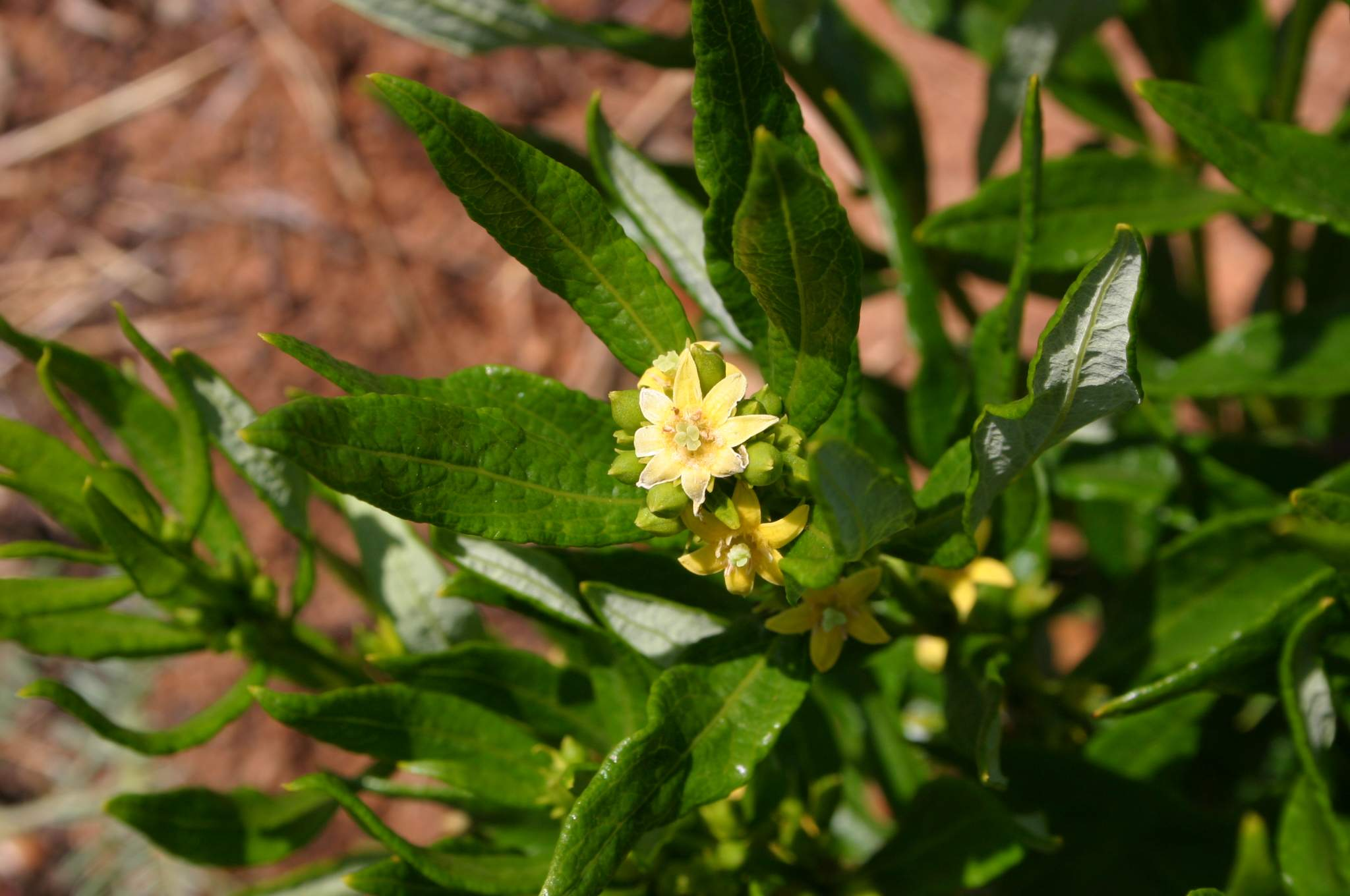

Fadogia homblei is a 60 cm-tall erect perennial sub-Saharan shrublet with subterranean stems producing unbranched annual shoots, and is one of some 47 species of Fadogia in the family Rubiaceae. It occurs in Angola, Tanzania, Malawi, Mozambique, Zambia, Zimbabwe, and in Limpopo and Gauteng Provinces in South Africa.

This species has leaves in whorls of 3–5. The leaves are elliptic or lanceolate, shiny above, with greyish-white papillose hairs on the undersurface. Fragrant flowers are in 3-5-flowered whorls arising from the leaf nodes, and are creamy yellow to bright yellow in colour. The fruit is spherical, crowned with the persistent calyx limb, initially green, but turning black when ripe, and is edible.

Browsing of this species has long been known to cause 'gousiekte' ("quick disease"), a cardiotoxicosis of ruminants marked by heart failure four to eight weeks after ingestion of certain species of Vangueria, Pavetta, and Fadogia, and is thought to be caused by the polyamine pavettamine. All six plants known to cause gousiekte are members of the family Rubiaceae. Laboratory analysis has revealed that the pavettamine concentration in Fadogia homblei was highest in the topmost leaf pair, and decreased towards the base of the plant. All the gousiekte-causing plants have symbiotic bacteria in their leaves, and at first these were suspected of playing a role in the production of pavettamine. However, cultures of the bacteria have not revealed any traces of pavettamine, showing that the toxin is either from an interaction with the plant or solely produced by the plant. The structure of pavettamine remained elusive, but was finally published in 2010 by Bode et al., some 15 years after it was first isolated, and found to be (2S,4R,8R,10S)-1,11-diamino-6-aza-undecane-2,4,8,10-tetraol. Despite the determination of pavettamine's structure, it has yet to be linked to gousiekte.

A large number of compounds were isolated from the fruits, leaves, and stem of the species, including:

- Scopoletin - anti-fungal, anti-spasmodic, anti-oxidant, anti-inflammatory, and anti-cancer.
- Luteolin - anti-mutagenic, anti-tumor, anti-oxidant, and anti-inflammatory.
- Quercetin - 3-O-β-D-galactoside is common in plants and an active ingredient of many herbal remedies, anti-hypertensive, vasodilatory.
- Lupeol - anti-oxidant, anti-angiogenic, anti-neoplastic, anti-inflammatory, and anti-malarial.
- Betulinic acid - anti-inflammatory, in vitro anti-malarial, anti-HIV, and anti-cancer.
- Sitosterol and stigmasterol - common compounds found in almost all plant species.
- Pinoresinol - inhibitor of 15-lipoxygenase.
- Uracil - isolated from the leaf of Fadogia homblei, significant as the first finding of uracil from plants other than ferns.

== Synonyms ==
- Fadogia monticola Robyns
- Fadogia oleoides Robyns
