= Vangueria venosa =

Scientific classification
- Kingdom: Plantae
- Clade: Tracheophytes
- Clade: Angiosperms
- Clade: Eudicots
- Clade: Asterids
- Order: Gentianales
- Family: Rubiaceae
- Genus: Vangueria
- Species: V. venosa

Binomial name
- Vangueria venosa (Hochst.) Sond.

Synonyms
- Pachystigma venosum Hochst.; Pachystigma cymosum Robyns

Species of plant

Vangueria venosa is a species of flowering plant in the family Rubiaceae. It is found in Mozambique, Eswatini and the former Transvaal region.

== Taxonomy ==
This species is not to be confused with Vangueria venosa Hochst. ex A.Rich.. That species name was originally proposed as a synonym for Vangueria madagascariensis, but is therefore an illegitimate name.
