= Acacia saxatilis =

Scientific classification
- Kingdom: Plantae
- Clade: Tracheophytes
- Clade: Angiosperms
- Clade: Eudicots
- Clade: Rosids
- Order: Fabales
- Family: Fabaceae
- Subfamily: Caesalpinioideae
- Clade: Mimosoid clade
- Genus: Acacia
- Species: A. saxatilis

Binomial name
- Acacia saxatilis S.Moore
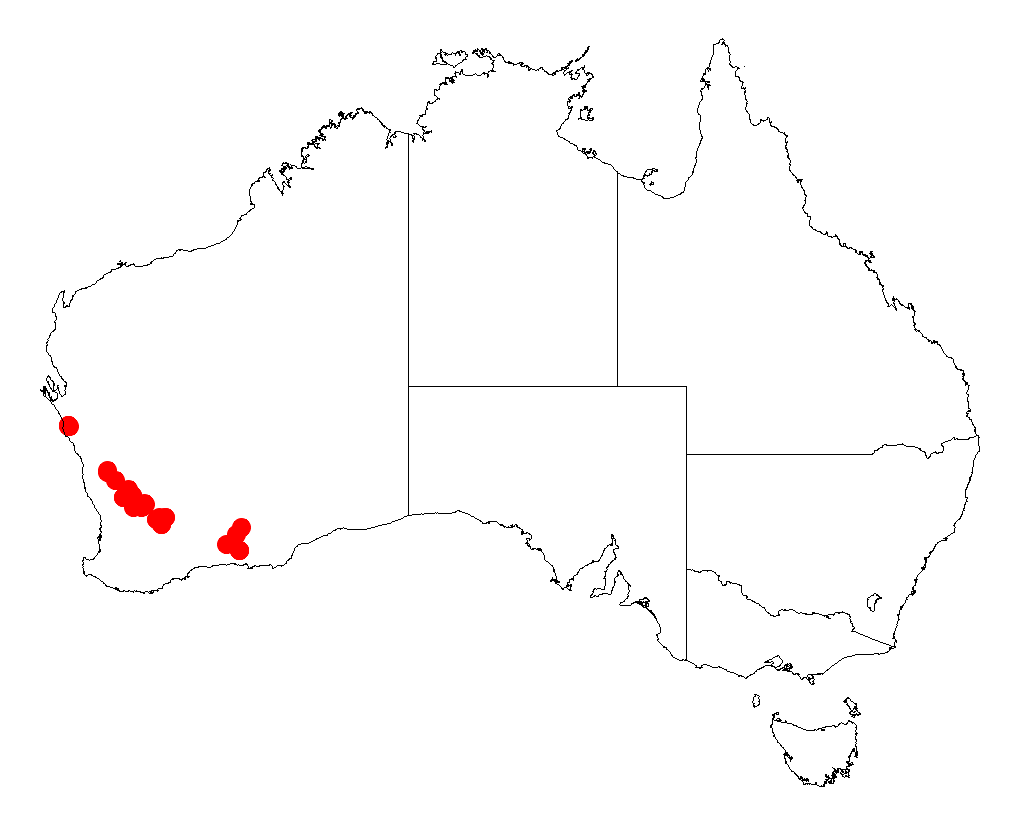
- Occurrence data from AVH

Species of legume

Acacia saxatilis is a shrub of the genus Acacia and the subgenus Phyllodineae that is endemic to south western Australia

== Description ==
The shrub typically grows to a height of 0.8 to 2.5 metres (3 to 8 ft). The glabrous and angular branchlets have caducous stipules. Like most species of Acacia it has phyllodes rather than true leaves. The ascending to erect and dull grey-green to bluish coloured phyllodes have a narrowly oblong shape with a length of 1.5 to 4 cm (0.59 to 1.57 in) and a width of 4 to 7 mm (0.16 to 0.28 in) with an inconspicuous midrib and no lateral nerves. It blooms from September to October and produces yellow flowers. The simple inflorescences are situated on two-headed racemes and have spherical flower-heads with a diameter of 4 to 6.5 mm (0.16 to 0.26 in) and contain 27 to 35 golden coloured flowers. Following flowering firmly charatceous seed pods form that have a linear shape but are raised the over seeds. The slightly undulate and glabrous pods are curved or form a coil with a length of up to 4 cm (1.6 in) and a width of 2.5 to 3 mm (0.098 to 0.118 in) and are covered in a fine white powdery coating. The glossy seeds inside have an elliptic to oblong-elliptic shape with a length of 2 to 2.5 mm (0.079 to 0.098 in) and a have a cream coloured aril.

== Taxonomy ==
The species was first formally described by the botanist Spencer Le Marchant Moore in 1920 as a part of the work A contribution to the Flora of Australia as published in the Journal of the Linnean Society, Botany. It was reclassified as Racosperma saxatile by Leslie Pedley in 2003 then transferred back to genus Acacia in 2006.

== Distribution ==
It is native to an area in the Wheatbelt and Mid West regions of Western Australia. where is found growing in clay, loam, sandy loam, and gravelly sandy clay soils. It has a scattered distribution from around Kalbarri in the north west down to around Coorow in the south and Bruce Rock in the south east where it is usually a part of open Eucalyptus woodland communities.

== See also ==
- List of Acacia species
