= Rhadinopus =

Rhadinopus may refer to:

- Rhadinopus (beetle), a genus of beetles in the family Curculionidae
- Rhadinopus (plant), a genus of plants in the family Rubiaceae
