= Vangueria coerulea =

Scientific classification
- Kingdom: Plantae
- Clade: Tracheophytes
- Clade: Angiosperms
- Clade: Eudicots
- Clade: Asterids
- Order: Gentianales
- Family: Rubiaceae
- Genus: Vangueria
- Species: V. coerulea

Binomial name
- Vangueria coerulea (Robyns) Lantz

Synonyms
- Pachystigma coeruleum Robyns

Species of plant

Vangueria coerulea is a species of flowering plant in the family Rubiaceae. It is endemic to Eswatini and the former Transvaal Province.
