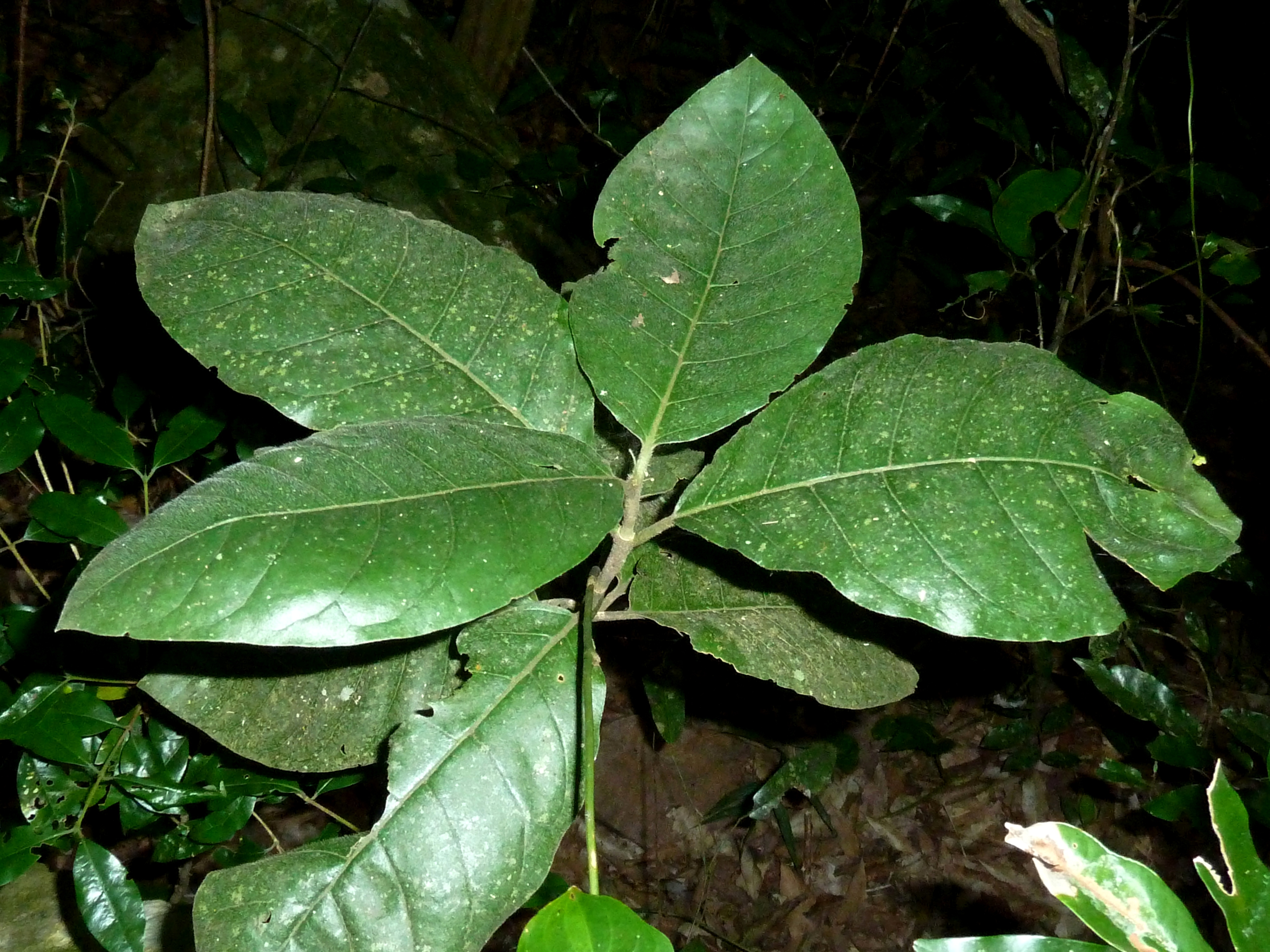

Scientific classification
- Kingdom: Plantae
- Clade: Tracheophytes
- Clade: Angiosperms
- Clade: Eudicots
- Clade: Asterids
- Order: Gentianales
- Family: Rubiaceae
- Genus: Vangueria
- Species: V. bowkeri

Binomial name
- Vangueria bowkeri (Robyns) Lantz

Synonyms
- Pachystigma bowkeri Robyns

= Vangueria bowkeri =

African tree species

Vangueria bowkeri is a species of flowering plant in the family Rubiaceae. It is endemic to South Africa and Eswatini. It was described by Walter Robyns in 1928 and named after Colonel James Henry Bowker, the collector of the type specimen.
