= Vangueria agrestis =

Scientific classification
- Kingdom: Plantae
- Clade: Tracheophytes
- Clade: Angiosperms
- Clade: Eudicots
- Clade: Asterids
- Order: Gentianales
- Family: Rubiaceae
- Genus: Vangueria
- Species: V. agrestis

Binomial name
- Vangueria agrestis (Schweinf. ex Hiern) Lantz

Synonyms
- Fadogia agrestis Schweinf. ex Hiern

Species of plant

Vangueria agrestis is a species of flowering plant in the family Rubiaceae. It is found from West Tropical Africa to Sudan.
