= Rytigynia nodulosa =

Conservation status
- Vulnerable (IUCN 2.3)

Scientific classification
- Kingdom: Plantae
- Clade: Tracheophytes
- Clade: Angiosperms
- Clade: Eudicots
- Clade: Asterids
- Order: Gentianales
- Family: Rubiaceae
- Genus: Rytigynia
- Species: R. nodulosa

Binomial name
- Rytigynia nodulosa (K.Schum.) Robyns

Species of plant

Rytigynia nodulosa is a species of flowering plant in the family Rubiaceae. It is endemic to Tanzania.
