= Rytigynia pseudolongicaudata =

Conservation status
- Vulnerable (IUCN 2.3)

Scientific classification
- Kingdom: Plantae
- Clade: Tracheophytes
- Clade: Angiosperms
- Clade: Eudicots
- Clade: Asterids
- Order: Gentianales
- Family: Rubiaceae
- Genus: Rytigynia
- Species: R. pseudolongicaudata

Binomial name
- Rytigynia pseudolongicaudata Verdc.

Species of plant

Rytigynia pseudolongicaudata is a species of flowering plant in the family Rubiaceae. It is endemic to Tanzania.
