= Vangueria schliebenii =

Conservation status
- Endangered (IUCN 2.3)

Scientific classification
- Kingdom: Plantae
- Clade: Tracheophytes
- Clade: Angiosperms
- Clade: Eudicots
- Clade: Asterids
- Order: Gentianales
- Family: Rubiaceae
- Genus: Vangueria
- Species: V. schliebenii

Binomial name
- Vangueria schliebenii (Verdc.) Lantz

Synonyms
- Tapiphyllum schliebenii

Species of plant

Vangueria schliebenii is a species of flowering plant in the family Rubiaceae. It is endemic to Tanzania.
