= Vangueria burnettii =

Scientific classification
- Kingdom: Plantae
- Clade: Tracheophytes
- Clade: Angiosperms
- Clade: Eudicots
- Clade: Asterids
- Order: Gentianales
- Family: Rubiaceae
- Genus: Vangueria
- Species: V. burnettii

Binomial name
- Vangueria burnettii (Tennant) Lantz

Synonyms
- Tapiphyllum burnettii Tennant

Species of plant

Vangueria burnettii is a species of flowering plant in the family Rubiaceae. It is endemic to southern Tanzania and Zambia.
