= Ancylanthos =

Scientific classification
- Kingdom: Plantae
- Clade: Tracheophytes
- Clade: Angiosperms
- Clade: Eudicots
- Clade: Asterids
- Order: Gentianales
- Family: Rubiaceae
- Subfamily: Dialypetalanthoideae
- Tribe: Vanguerieae
- Genus: Ancylanthos; Desf.

Type species
- Ancylanthos rubiginosus Desf.

Genus of plants

Ancylanthos was a genus of flowering plants in the family Rubiaceae but is no longer recognized. It was originally described by René Louiche Desfontaines in 1818. In 2005, it was sunk into synonymy with Vangueria, based on a phylogenetic study of DNA sequences.

Desfontaines established the genus for the single species rubiginosa. By 1995 it also included the four species lactiflorus, monteiroi, rhodesiacus, and rogersii, which Bridson considered should be moved to other genera.
