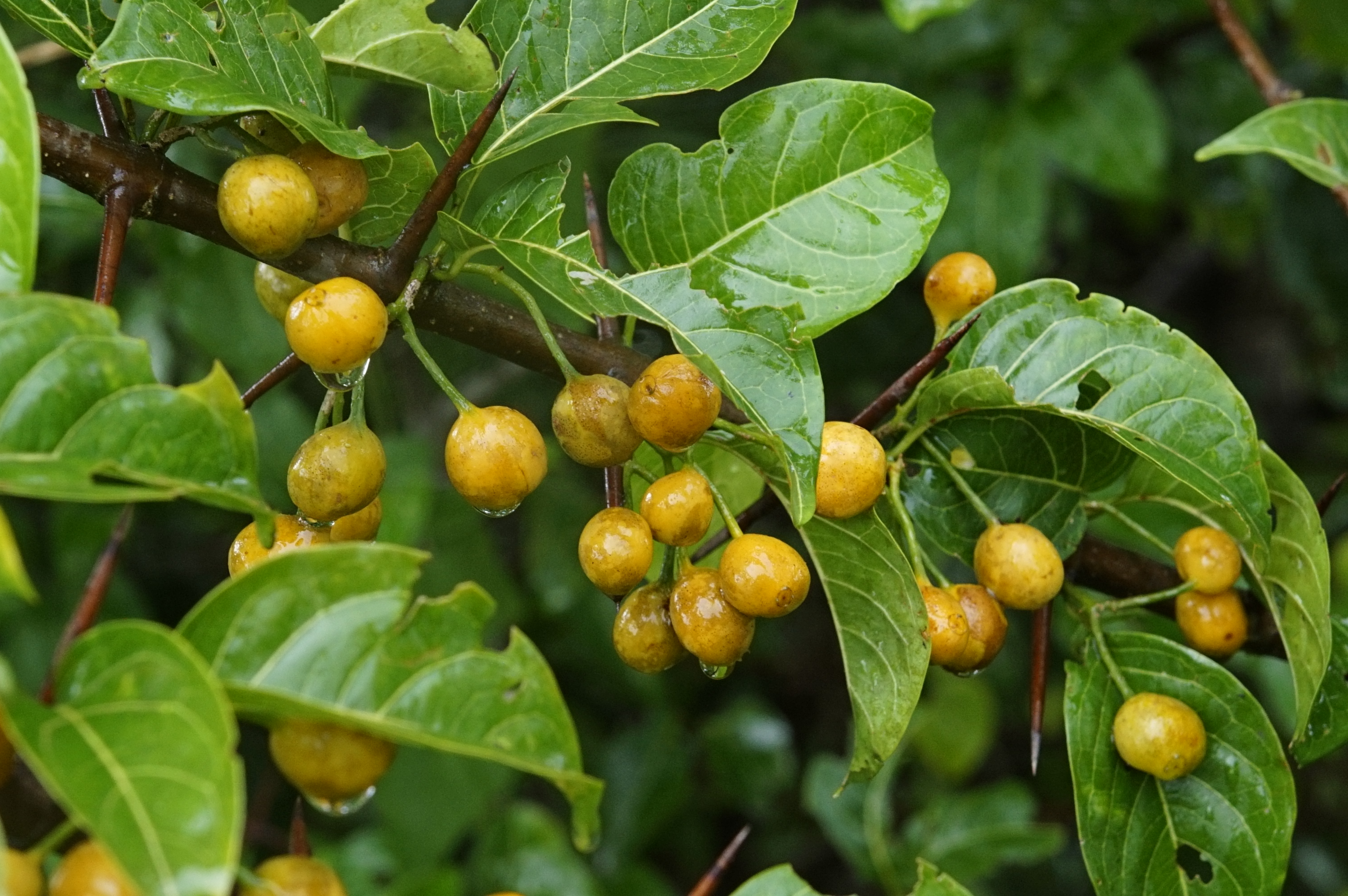

Scientific classification
- Kingdom: Plantae
- Clade: Tracheophytes
- Clade: Angiosperms
- Clade: Eudicots
- Clade: Asterids
- Order: Gentianales
- Family: Rubiaceae
- Genus: Meyna
- Species: M. laxiflora

Binomial name
- Meyna laxiflora Robyns

= Meyna laxiflora =

Species of plant

Meyna laxiflora is a species of flowering plant in the family Rubiaceae. It has a world-wide distribution across tropical and subtropical regions.

== Description ==
Meyna laxiflora is an armed shrub or small tree with greenish-yellow flowers. The calyx of the flower is cup shaped, and the fruits of the tree are round, fleshy, and edible. It flowers in January to March.
