= Rytigynia eickii =

Conservation status
- Vulnerable (IUCN 2.3)

Scientific classification
- Kingdom: Plantae
- Clade: Tracheophytes
- Clade: Angiosperms
- Clade: Eudicots
- Clade: Asterids
- Order: Gentianales
- Family: Rubiaceae
- Genus: Rytigynia
- Species: R. eickii

Binomial name
- Rytigynia eickii (K.Schum. & K.Krause) Bullock

Synonyms
- Plectronia eickii K.Schum. & K.Krause; Rytigynia biflora Robyns

Species of plant

Rytigynia eickii is a species of flowering plant in the family Rubiaceae. It is found in Kenya and Tanzania.
