= Vangueria albosetulosa =

Scientific classification
- Kingdom: Plantae
- Clade: Tracheophytes
- Clade: Angiosperms
- Clade: Eudicots
- Clade: Asterids
- Order: Gentianales
- Family: Rubiaceae
- Genus: Vangueria
- Species: V. albosetulosa

Binomial name
- Vangueria albosetulosa (Verdc.) Lantz

Synonyms
- Pachystigma albosetulosum Verdc.

Species of plant

Vangueria albosetulosa is a species of flowering plant in the family Rubiaceae. It is endemic to Zambia.
