= Rytigynia longipedicellata =

Conservation status
- Endangered (IUCN 2.3)

Scientific classification
- Kingdom: Plantae
- Clade: Tracheophytes
- Clade: Angiosperms
- Clade: Eudicots
- Clade: Asterids
- Order: Gentianales
- Family: Rubiaceae
- Genus: Rytigynia
- Species: R. longipedicellata

Binomial name
- Rytigynia longipedicellata Verdcourt

Species of plant

Rytigynia longipedicellata is a species of plant in the family Rubiaceae. It is endemic to Tanzania. It is threatened by habitat loss.
