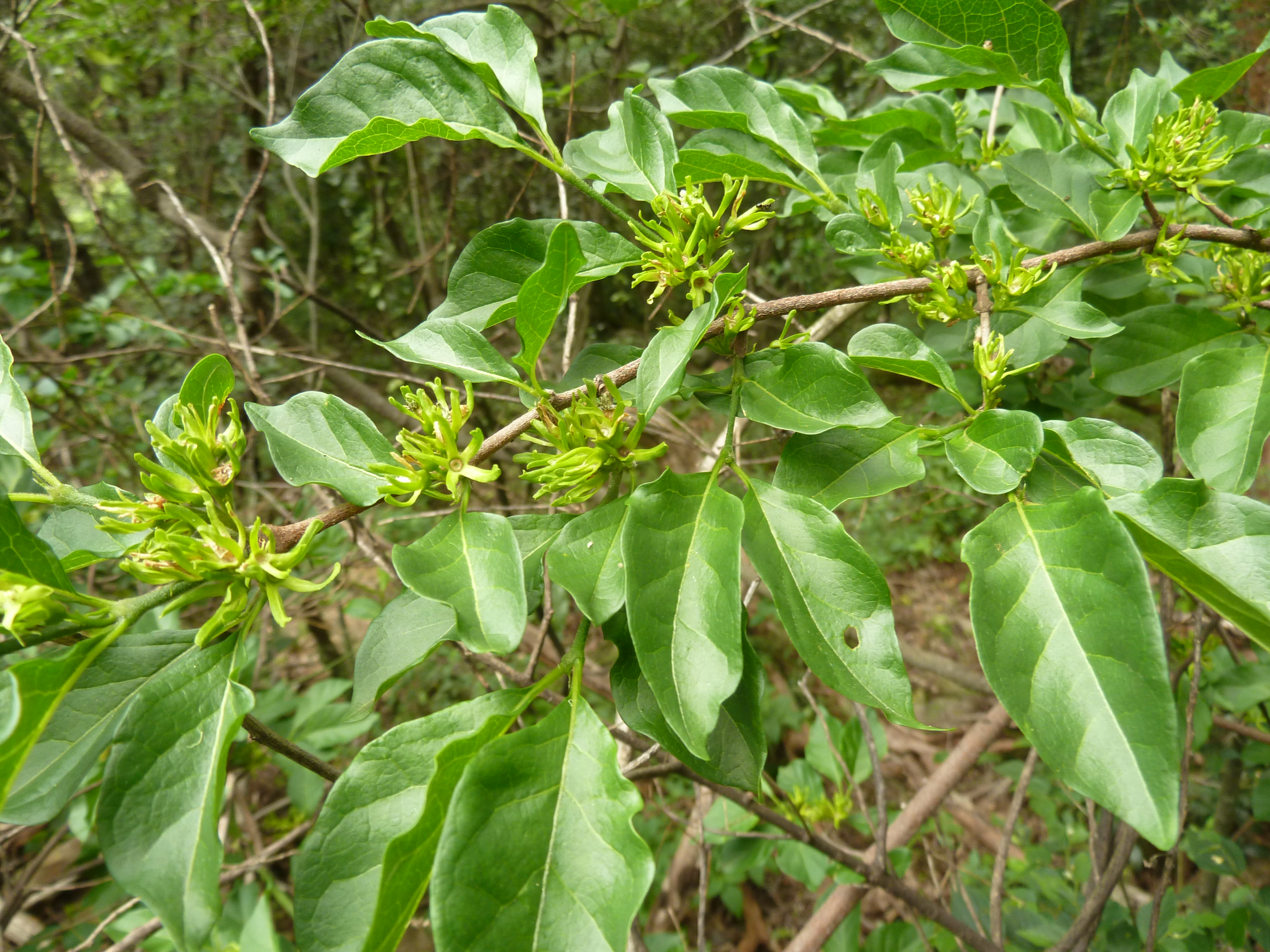
- P. macrocalyx (Sond.) Robyns, now a synonym of Vangueria macrocalyx Sond.

Scientific classification
- Kingdom: Plantae
- Clade: Tracheophytes
- Clade: Angiosperms
- Clade: Eudicots
- Clade: Asterids
- Order: Gentianales
- Family: Rubiaceae
- Subfamily: Dialypetalanthoideae
- Tribe: Vanguerieae
- Genus: Pachystigma; Hochst.

= Pachystigma =

Genus of plants

Pachystigma was a genus of flowering plants in the family Rubiaceae but is no longer recognized. In 2005, it was sunk into synonymy with Vangueria, based on a phylogenetic study of DNA sequences.
