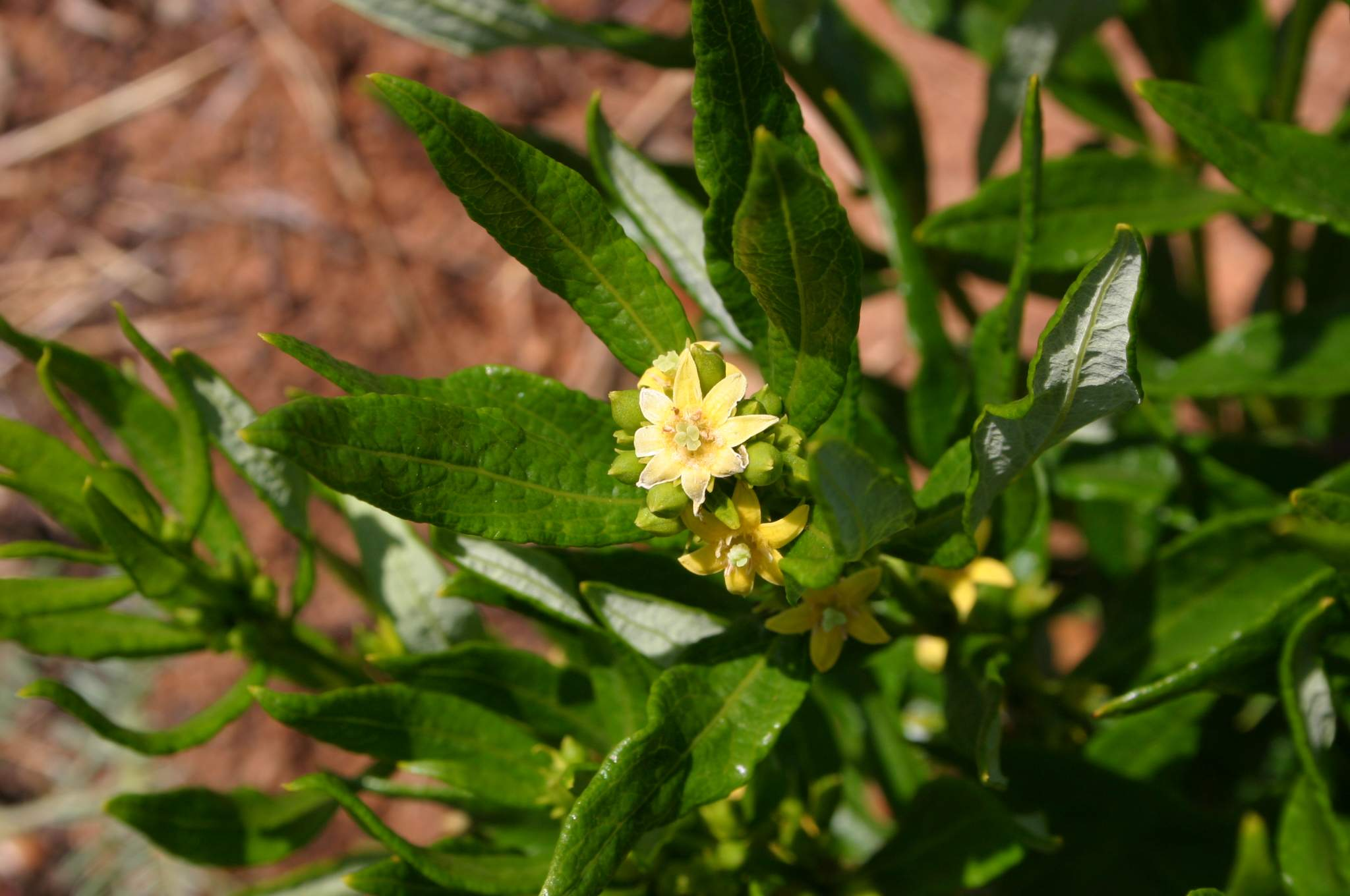
- Fadogia homblei

Scientific classification
- Kingdom: Plantae
- Clade: Tracheophytes
- Clade: Angiosperms
- Clade: Eudicots
- Clade: Asterids
- Order: Gentianales
- Family: Rubiaceae
- Subfamily: Dialypetalanthoideae
- Tribe: Vanguerieae
- Genus: Fadogia; Schweinf.

Type species
- Fadogia cienkowskii Schweinf.

= Fadogia =

Genus of plants

Fadogia is a genus of flowering plants in the family Rubiaceae. The genera Rytigynia and Fadogia form a strongly supported clade but neither of these genera is monophyletic.

== Distribution ==
Fadogia is found in Tropical Africa. F. cienkowskii and F. tetraquetra have the largest distribution and occur from Guinea to the Transvaal province. F. ancylantha and F. erythrophloea are also found in many African countries, but they don't occur so far south. The countries with the highest number of species are Angola, Democratic Republic of the Congo, Zambia, Tanzania, and Central African Republic.

== Bacterial leaf symbiosis ==
Endophytic bacteria are housed in the intercellular space of the leaf mesophyll tissue. The presence of these bacteria can only be microscopically ascertained. The bacteria are identified as Burkholderia, which is a genus that is also found in the leaves of other Rubiaceae species. The hypothesis is that these endophytic bacteria provide chemical protection against insect herbivory.

== Gousiekte ==
Fadogia homblei is known to cause gousiekte, a cardiotoxicosis of ruminants characterised by heart failure four to eight weeks after ingestion of certain rubiaceous plants.

== Species ==
- Fadogia ancylantha Schweinf.
- Fadogia andersonii Robyns
- Fadogia arenicola K.Schum. & K.Krause
- Fadogia audruana M.Fay, J.-P.Lebrun & Stork
- Fadogia butayei De Wild.
- Fadogia caespitosa Robyns
- Fadogia chlorantha K.Schum.
- Fadogia chrysantha K.Schum.
- Fadogia cienkowskii Schweinf.
- Fadogia elskensii De Wild.
- Fadogia erythrophloea (K.Schum. & K.Krause) Hutch. & Dalziel
- Fadogia fragrans Robyns
- Fadogia fuchsioides Schweinf. ex Oliv.
- Fadogia glaberrima Welw. ex Hiern
- Fadogia gossweileri Robyns
- Fadogia graminea Wernham
- Fadogia homblei Robyns
- Fadogia lactiflora Welw. ex Hiern
- Fadogia latifolia A.Chev. ex Robyns
- Fadogia leucophloea Schweinf. ex Hiern
- Fadogia luangwae Verdc.
- Fadogia oblongolanceolata Robyns
- Fadogia obscura A.Chev. ex Robyns
- Fadogia olivacea Robyns
- Fadogia parvifolia Verdc.
- Fadogia pobeguinii Pobég.
- Fadogia punctulata Robyns
- Fadogia rostrata Robyns
- Fadogia salictaria S.Moore
- Fadogia schmitzii Verdc.
- Fadogia spectabilis Milne-Redh.
- Fadogia stenophylla Welw. ex Hiern
- Fadogia tetraquetra K.Schum. & K.Krause
- Fadogia tomentosa De Wild.
- Fadogia triphylla Baker
- Fadogia variifolia Robyns
- Fadogia verdcourtii Tennant
- Fadogia verdickii De Wild. & T.Durand
- Fadogia vollesenii Verdc.
