= Vangueria cinnamomea =

Scientific classification
- Kingdom: Plantae
- Clade: Tracheophytes
- Clade: Angiosperms
- Clade: Eudicots
- Clade: Asterids
- Order: Gentianales
- Family: Rubiaceae
- Genus: Vangueria
- Species: V. cinnamomea

Binomial name
- Vangueria cinnamomea Dinter

Species of plant

Vangueria cinnamomea is a species of flowering plant in the family Rubiaceae. It is endemic to Namibia. The epithet is a Latin adjective meaning cinnamon-coloured.
