= Rhadinopus (plant) =

Scientific classification
- Kingdom: Plantae
- Clade: Tracheophytes
- Clade: Angiosperms
- Clade: Eudicots
- Clade: Asterids
- Order: Gentianales
- Family: Rubiaceae
- Genus: Rhadinopus; S.Moore

Genus of plants

Rhadinopus is a genus of flowering plants belonging to the family Rubiaceae.

Its native range is Southeastern New Guinea.

Species:

- Rhadinopus kurivana Ridsdale
- Rhadinopus papuana S.Moore
