= Vangueria burttii =

Scientific classification
- Kingdom: Plantae
- Clade: Tracheophytes
- Clade: Angiosperms
- Clade: Eudicots
- Clade: Asterids
- Order: Gentianales
- Family: Rubiaceae
- Genus: Vangueria
- Species: V. burttii

Binomial name
- Vangueria burttii (Verdc.) Lantz

Synonyms
- Pachystigma burttii Verdc.

Species of plant

Vangueria burttii is a species of flowering plant in the family Rubiaceae. It is endemic to Tanzania. It was described by Bernard Verdcourt in 1981 and is named after the English botanist Brian Burtt.
