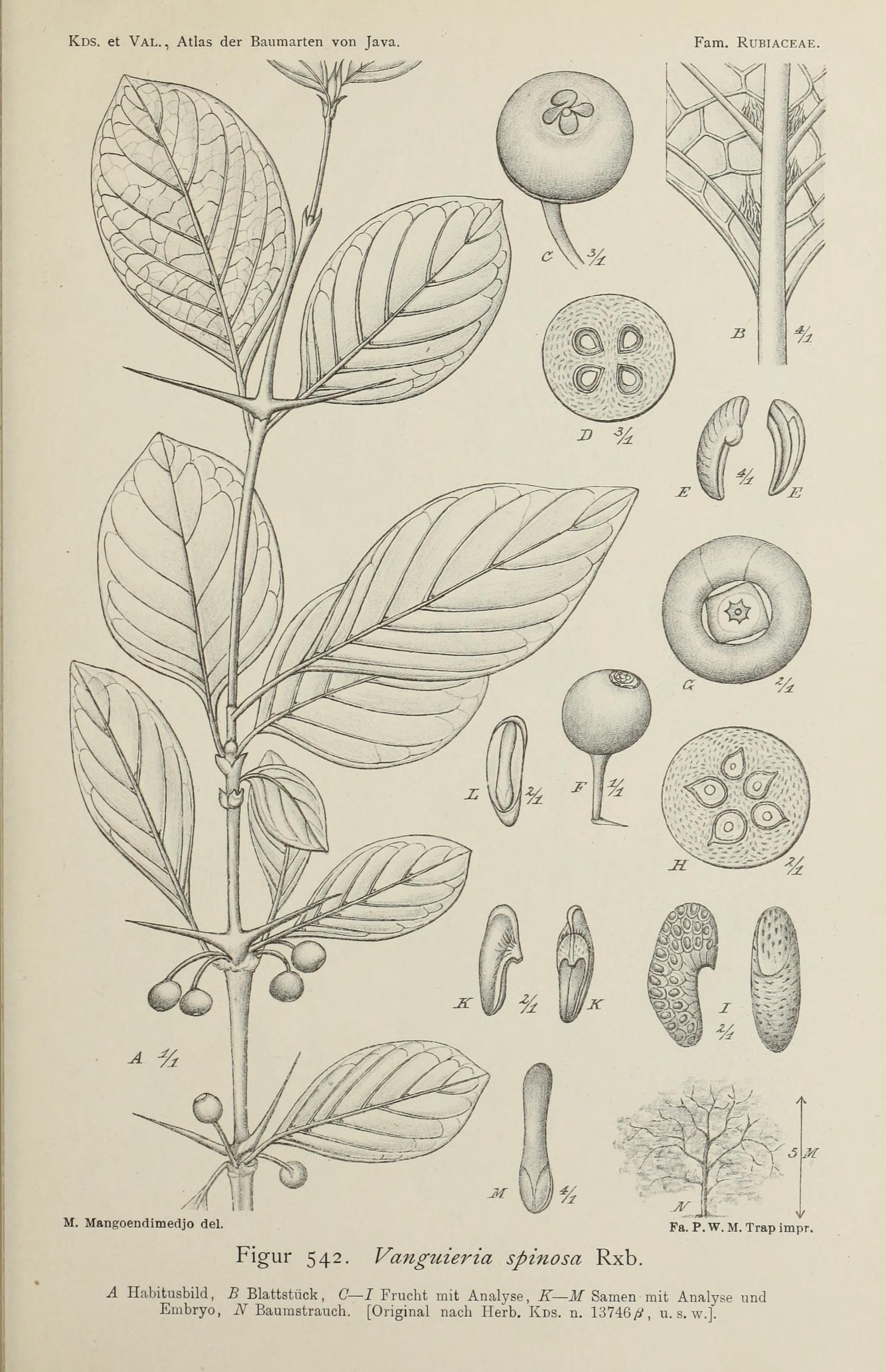

Scientific classification
- Kingdom: Plantae
- Clade: Tracheophytes
- Clade: Angiosperms
- Clade: Eudicots
- Clade: Asterids
- Order: Gentianales
- Family: Rubiaceae
- Genus: Meyna
- Species: M. spinosa

Binomial name
- Meyna spinosa Roxb. ex Link

Synonyms
- Pyrostria spinosa (Roxb. ex Link) Miq.; Vangueria miqueliana Kurz; Vangueria mollis Wall.; Vangueria pyrostria Boerl.; Vangueria spinosa (Roxb. ex Link) Roxb.; Vangueria spinosa var. tomentosa Pierre; Vangueria spinosa var. tomentosa Pierre ex Pit.; Vangueria stellata Blanco

= Meyna spinosa =

Species of plant

Meyna spinosa is a species of flowering plant in the family Rubiaceae. It has a world-wide distribution across tropical and subtropical regions mainly in E. Asia - India, Nepal, Bangladesh, Myanmar, Thailand, Cambodia, Laos, Vietnam. Its Assamese name is: কোঁটকোৰা, in Burmese it is called ဆေးမန်ကျည်းပင်.

== Description ==
Meyna spinosa is a deciduous, thorny, straggling shrub or small tree that can grow up to 5 metres tall. The fruits of the tree are yellow, subglobose berry around 20mm in diameter containing 4 - 5 hard seeds, and edible. It is also use as a medicine.
