= Rytigynia hirsutiflora =

Conservation status
- Vulnerable (IUCN 2.3)

Scientific classification
- Kingdom: Plantae
- Clade: Tracheophytes
- Clade: Angiosperms
- Clade: Eudicots
- Clade: Asterids
- Order: Gentianales
- Family: Rubiaceae
- Genus: Rytigynia
- Species: R. hirsutiflora

Binomial name
- Rytigynia hirsutiflora Verdc.

Species of plant

Rytigynia hirsutiflora is a species of shrub in the family Rubiaceae. It is endemic to Tanzania, and mainly grows in seasonally dry tropical areas. Its habitat is moist montane forest. It can be found in the North Udzungwa Mountains, at Sanje and Udekwa.

It was first scientifically described by Bernard Verdcourt in 1987.
