= Vangueria bicolor =

Conservation status
- Vulnerable (IUCN 2.3)

Scientific classification
- Kingdom: Plantae
- Clade: Tracheophytes
- Clade: Angiosperms
- Clade: Eudicots
- Clade: Asterids
- Order: Gentianales
- Family: Rubiaceae
- Genus: Vangueria
- Species: V. bicolor

Binomial name
- Vangueria bicolor K.Schum.

Species of plant

Vangueria bicolor is a species of flowering plant in the family Rubiaceae. It is endemic to Tanzania.
