= Vangueria induta =

Conservation status
- Vulnerable (IUCN 2.3)

Scientific classification
- Kingdom: Plantae
- Clade: Tracheophytes
- Clade: Angiosperms
- Clade: Eudicots
- Clade: Asterids
- Order: Gentianales
- Family: Rubiaceae
- Genus: Vangueria
- Species: V. induta

Binomial name
- Vangueria induta (Bullock) Lantz

Species of plant

Vangueria induta is a species of flowering plant in the family Rubiaceae. It is found in Kenya and northern Tanzania.
