= Vangueria pallidiflora =

Conservation status
- Vulnerable (IUCN 2.3)

Scientific classification
- Kingdom: Plantae
- Clade: Tracheophytes
- Clade: Angiosperms
- Clade: Eudicots
- Clade: Asterids
- Order: Gentianales
- Family: Rubiaceae
- Genus: Vangueria
- Species: V. pallidiflora

Binomial name
- Vangueria pallidiflora (Bullock) Lantz

Species of plant

Vangueria pallidiflora is a species of flowering plant in the family Rubiaceae. It is endemic to Kenya and Tanzania.
