= Julius von Rohr =

Julius Philipp Benjamin von Rohr (1737–1793) was a Prussian-born botanist and plant collector, naturalist, medical doctor and watercolourist, in Danish service who sent many plants to Europe from South America and the West Indies. He collected male Myristica fragrans flowers on the Isle de Cayenne in about 1784.

== Career ==
He created the genus Melanthera which is closely related to Bidens in 1792, and is commemorated by the monotypic genus Rohria Schreb., native to French Guiana This botanist is denoted by the author abbreviation J.P.Rohr when citing a botanical name.

Von Rohr was an immigrant to Denmark, and in 1757 was appointed as municipal buildings inspector and government land surveyor of the Danish West Indies, now known as the United States Virgin Islands. The Danish crown also commissioned a study of the natural history of the islands. Von Rohr started a botanic garden in Christiansted on the island of St. Croix, corresponding with noted natural history scientists back in Denmark and in Europe. In the 1780s he studied cotton cultivation in the Antilles, exploring as far as Cayenne and Cartagena. By now he had been given the rank of lieutenant colonel.

In the 1790s Denmark considered abolishing the Atlantic slave trade, a measure expected to bring down the flourishing sugarcane plantations of the Danish West Indies. Von Rohr, who by this time had acquired considerable administrative experience of the colony, was asked to investigate the feasibility of establishing plantation agriculture in the vicinity of the old Danish slaving forts of Guinea on the West African coast.

Von Rohr packed and sent ahead to Fort Christiansborg his surveying instruments and library, a catalogue of titles reflecting his colonial involvement. His library included books and periodicals sent to him from England by Joseph Banks. He traveled via the United States, where he was entertained by prominent public figures and natural historians in Philadelphia and New York City. It is claimed that Von Rohr's mission ended abruptly when the ship on which he was travelling to Africa from New York disappeared somewhere in the Atlantic. Botanist Benjamin Smith Barton, though, declared that he did make the voyage safely, but died of fever shortly after:

"....my friend the late Mr. Julius von Rohr, a gentleman whose death is a real loss to natural science, and perhaps an irreparable loss to the interests of an injured and oppressed part of mankind: I mean the Blacks. In the summer of 1793, I took my last adieu of this learned botanist, and most amiable man. He sailed, from New York, for the coast of Africa, where he contemplated the establishment of a colony of Blacks. A few days after he had landed on the African continent, he died of a malignant fever. With him, I fear, has perished, for a long time at least, one of the best concerted schemes for the safe and happy emancipation of the swarthy children of Africa. Von Rohr was another Howard. In benevolence and good sense, he was, at least, equal to the great English philanthropist. In science certainly, and perhaps in the simplicity of his conduct, and the unambitious fervour of his zeal, he was the superior".

== Bibliography ==
- Martinho Vahl Eclogae Americanae seu Descriptiones Plantarum praesertim Americae Meridionalis nondum cognitarum. Fasc. I & II (of III).

== Works ==
- Rohr, Julius Philip Benjamin von: Anmerkungen über den Kattunbau : zum Nutzen der dänischen westindischen Colonien
