= William Philip Hiern =

British mathematician and botanist

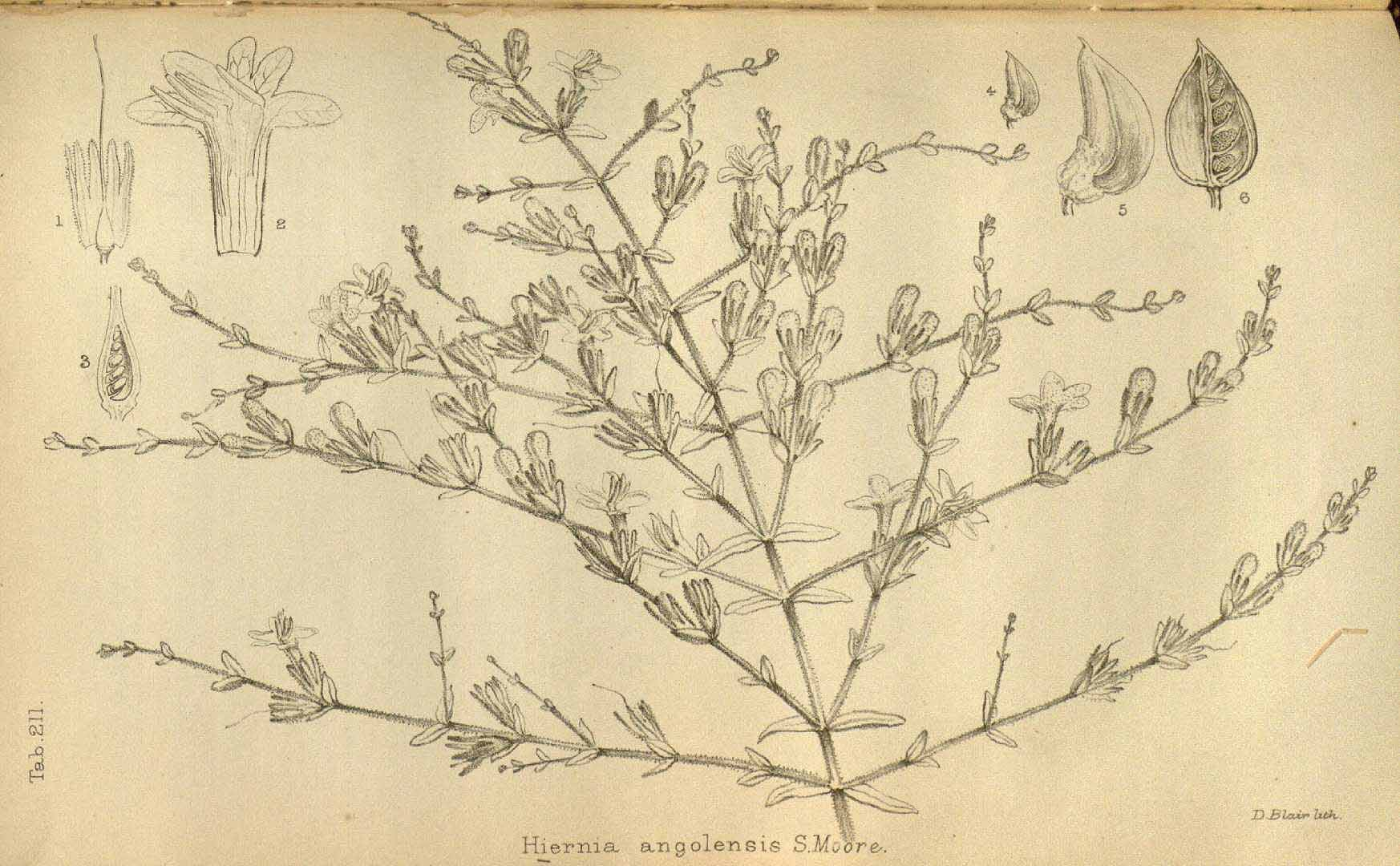
Hiernia angolensis named in honour of Hiern

William Philip Hiern FRS FLS (19 January 1839, in Stafford – 28 November 1925, in Barnstaple) was a British mathematician and botanist. The standard author abbreviation Hiern is used to indicate this person as the author when citing a botanical name.

== Life ==
Hiern attended St. John's College, Cambridge, from 1857 to 1861 and attained a first class degree in mathematics. Later, in 1886, he attended Oxford University.

Upon his marriage he moved to Surrey and developed an interest in botany.

In 1881, Hiern moved to Barnstaple in north Devonshire, and lived at the manor house adjacent to the Barnstaple Castle mound. Hiern was quite taken with the country squire role and he assumed many public duties including those of the Lord of the Manor of Stoke Rivers, northeast of Barnstaple, and he was one of the original aldermen of the County of Devon.

For a one-year term from 1916 to 1917, he was the president of the Devonshire Association.

== Contributions ==
Hiern published over 50 works on botanical subjects. Among his chief works was the catalogue of the plants Friedrich Welwitsch had collected in Angola.

His botanical specimens are stored at Exeter's Royal Albert Memorial Museum, at Kew Gardens, and at Cambridge.

== Awards and honours ==
In 1903, Hiern was elected a fellow of the Royal Society.

The African figwort genus Hiernia was named in his honor, as was the Ixora hiernii (a tropical evergreen shrub), the Pavetta hierniana (an evergreen shrub) and the Coffea canephora var hiernii (a species of coffee plant). Gabon Ebony (Diospyros crassiflora, itself the source of much taxonomic confusion over the years) was also first described by Hiern in 1873.
