= Spencer Le Marchant Moore =

English botanist (1850–1931)

Spencer Le Marchant Moore (1 November 1850 – 14 March 1931) was an English botanist.

== Biography ==
Moore was born in Hampstead. He worked at the Royal Botanic Gardens, Kew, from about 1870 to 1879, wrote a number of botanical papers, and then worked in an unofficial capacity at the Natural History Museum from 1896 until his death.

He was involved in an expedition to remote parts of Western Australia from December 1894 to October 1895, travelling from Goldfields–Esperance to places like Siberia Soak—near Waverley—and Goongarrie.

Moore is commemorated in the plant genus Spenceria.
