= Frans Hubert Edouard Arthur Walter Robyns =

Belgian botanist (1901-1986)

Walter Robyns
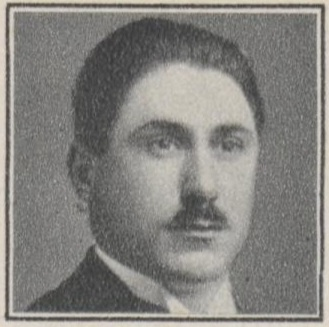
- Born: 25 May 1901; Aalst, Belgium
- Died: 27 December 1986 (aged 85)
- Scientific career
- Fields: Botany
- Workplaces: National Botanic Garden of Belgium
- Author abbrev. (botany): Robyns

Frans Hubert Edouard Arthur Walter Robyns (1901-1986), known as Walter Robyns, was a Belgian botanist. His son, André Robyns (1935–2003), was also a botanist.

== Biography ==
He received his doctorate in sciences at the University of Louvain. Robyns spent two long stays at the Royal Botanic Gardens Kew, travelled in central Africa and performed taxonomic work on many groups of tropical African plants, amongst others: Rubiaceae, grasses and legumes.

From 1931 to 1966 he served as director of the Jardin Botanique National de Belgique (National Botanic Garden of Belgium), where he shaped the transfer of the institute from the site in Brussels to the Bouchout Domain in Meise.

He was the initiator of a monographic flora series for central Africa, still continued today ("Flore d'Afrique centrale"). From 1959 to 1964 he was president of the International Association for Plant Taxonomy.

== Partial bibliography ==
- Flore agrostologique du Congo Belge et du Ruanda-Urundi, Bruxelles : Goemaere, 1929-1934 – Agrostologic flora of the Belgian Congo and Ruanda-Urundi.
- Flore des spermatophytes du Parc national Albert (with Roland Tournay) Bruxelles : Institut des parcs nationaux du Congo belge, 1947-1955 – Spermatophytes from the Albert National Park.
- Les territoires biogéographiques du Parc National Albert, Bruxelles : Institut des parcs nationaux du Congo belge, 1948 – Biogeographic territories of the Albert National Park.
- Flore du Congo belge et du Ruanda-Urundi, préparée par le Comité exécutif, Bruxelles : [Jardin botanique de l'État], 1958 – Flora of the Belgian Congo and Ruanda-Urundi.

== Eponymy ==
- Robynsia, family Rubiaceae, name introduced by John Hutchinson (1931).
- Robynsiella, family Amaranthaceae, name introduced by Karl Suessenguth (1938).
- Robynsiochloa, family Poaceae, name introduced by Henri Jacques-Félix (1960).
- Robynsiophyton, family Fabaceae, name introduced by Rudolf Wilczek (1953).

== Sources ==
- Diagre-Vanderpelen, D.; Fabri, R.. (2020). "Robyns, Frans, Hubert, Édouard, Arthur, Walter, botaniste, directeur du Jardin botanique de l’État à Bruxelles, professeur à l’Université catholique de Louvain, né à Mielen-boven-Aelst le 25 mai 1901, décédé à Uccle le 27 décembre 1986". Nouvelle Biographie Nationale, Bruxelles. 15: 312-314.
