= Bridson =

Bridson is a Manx surname. Notable people with the surname include:

- Annie Dorothy Bridson (1893–1985), Manx member of the House of Keys, and the first woman president of the Manx Labour Party
- D. G. Bridson (1910–1980), British BBC radio author and producer
- Diane Mary Bridson (born 1942), British botanist, wife of Gavin
- Gavin Bridson (1936–2008), British bibliographer and librarian, husband of Diane
- Gordon Bridson (1909–1972), New Zealand swimmer and naval commander
- John Bridson (1863–1898), Australian cricketer
- Martin Bridson (born 1964), Manx mathematician
- Norma Williams (née Bridson, 1928–2017), New Zealand swimmer, swimming administrator and author

== See also ==
- Thomas Bridson Cribb (1845–1913), Australian politician
