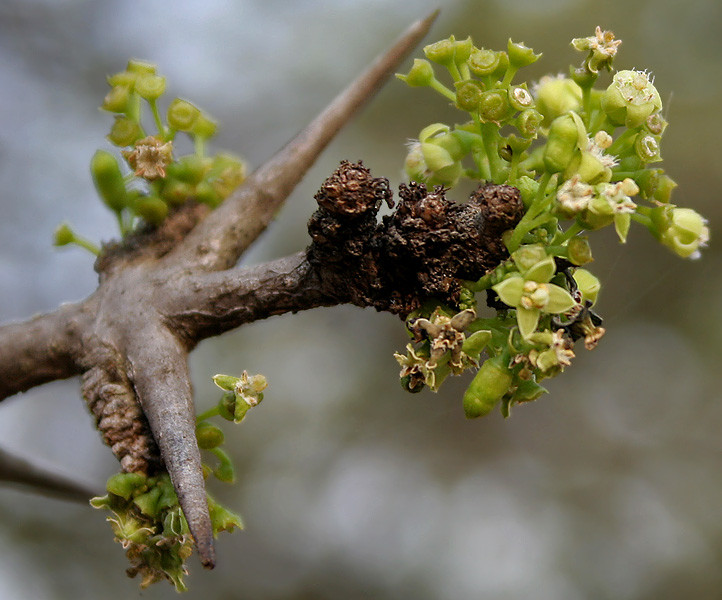
- Canthium coromandelicum

Scientific classification
- Kingdom: Plantae
- Clade: Tracheophytes
- Clade: Angiosperms
- Clade: Eudicots
- Clade: Asterids
- Order: Gentianales
- Family: Rubiaceae
- Subfamily: Dialypetalanthoideae
- Tribe: Vanguerieae
- Genus: Canthium; Lam.

Type species
- Canthium coromandelicum (Burm.f.) Alston

Synonyms
- Clusiophyllea Baill.; Dondisia DC.; Lycioserissa Roem. & Schult.; Plectroniella Robyns (1928); Psilostoma Klotzsch ex Eckl. & Zeyh.

= Canthium =

Genus of plants

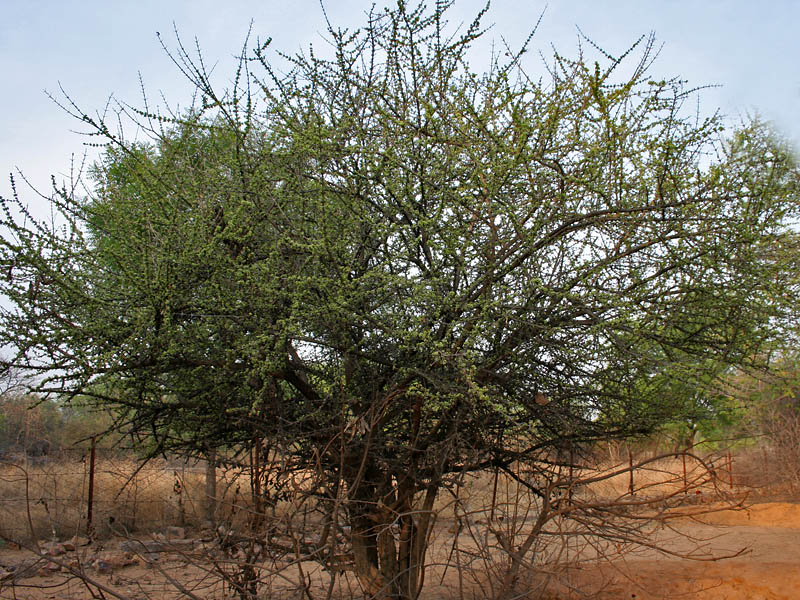
Canthium coromandelicum

Canthium is a genus of flowering plants in the family Rubiaceae. They are shrubs and small trees. The leaves are deciduous and the stems are usually thorny.

== Distribution ==
Canthium species were predominantly found in Southeast Asia, especially in Thailand and the Philippines. A small number of species was found in India, Sri Lanka, and Bangladesh. Only a limited number of species were found on the African continent, especially in Southern and East Africa.

== Taxonomy ==
Canthium was named by Jean-Baptiste Lamarck in 1785 in Encyclopédie Méthodique. The name is a latinisation of "kantankara", a Malayalam name from Kerala for Canthium coromandelicum. Kantan means "shining" and kara means "a spiny shrub". The biological type for the genus consists of specimens originally described by Jean-Baptiste Lamarck as Canthium parviflorum but this species is now included in Canthium coromandelicum. Canthium is a member of Vanguerieae, a tribe that is monophyletic and easily recognized morphologically, but in which generic boundaries were, for a long time, very unclear. Canthium was especially problematic, and until the 1980s, it was defined broadly and known to be polyphyletic. Psydrax was separated from it in 1985, as was Keetia in 1986. These were followed by Pyrostria and Multidentia in 1987. The subgenus Afrocanthium was raised to generic rank in 2004, followed by Bullockia in 2009. A few species were transferred to Canthium from Rytigynia and other genera in 2004. The genus was further reduced by the transfer of species to Peponidium and Pyrostria. In 2016, two Canthium species endemic to the Philippines were transferred to a genus of their own, Kanapia. The final circumscription of Canthium will remain in doubt until phylogenetic studies achieve greater resolution for the clade containing Canthium coromandelicum and its closest relatives.

== Species ==
As of 2023, Plants of the World Online recognises the following species:

- Canthium aciculatum Ridl.
- Canthium angustifolium Roxb.
- Canthium arboreum Vidal
- Canthium armatum (K.Schum.) Lantz
- Canthium aurantiacum Merr. & L.M.Perry
- Canthium berberidifolium Geddes
- Canthium bipinnatum (Blanco) Merr.
- Canthium brunneum (Merr.) Merr.
- Canthium bugoyense (K.Krause) Lantz
- Canthium calvum Craib
- Canthium cambodianum Pit.
- Canthium campanulatum Thwaites
- Canthium cavaleriei H.Lév.
- Canthium ciliatum (D.Dietr.) Kuntze
- Canthium coffeoides Pierre ex Pit.
- Canthium congestiflorum Ridl.
- Canthium cordatum Dillwyn
- Canthium coromandelicum (Brum.f.) Alston
- Canthium depressinerve Ridl.
- Canthium ellipticum (Merr.) Merr.
- Canthium fenicis (Merr.) Merr.
- Canthium ferrugineum Craib
- Canthium filipendulum Pierre ex Pit.
- Canthium fraternum Miq.
- Canthium glaucum Hiern
- Canthium gracilipes Kurz
- Canthium hainanense (Merr.) Lantz
- Canthium hirtellum Ridl.
- Canthium hispidonervosum (De Wild.) C.M.Evrard
- Canthium horridulum Craib
- Canthium horridum Blume
- Canthium inerme (L.f.) Kuntze
- Canthium korthalsianum Miq.
- Canthium kuntzeanum Bridson
- Canthium laeve Teijsm. & Binn.
- Canthium lasianthoides Miq.
- Canthium libericum Dinkl.
- Canthium longipes Geddes
- Canthium lucidum R.Br.
- Canthium macrocarpum Thwaites
- Canthium malayense K.M.Wong
- Canthium megacarpum (Merr.) Merr.
- Canthium megistocarpum Merr. & L.M.Perry
- Canthium merrillianum Mabb.
- Canthium mite Bartl. ex DC.
- Canthium molle King & Gamble
- Canthium moluccanum Roxb.
- Canthium oblongum (Valeton) Kaneh.
- Canthium obscurum W.J.de Wilde & Duyfjes
- Canthium oliganthum (Miq.) Boerl.
- Canthium oligocarpum Hiern
- Canthium parvifolium Roxb.
- Canthium paucinervium (Merr.) Merr.
- Canthium pedunculare Cav.
- Canthium perakanthus ined.
- Canthium polyanthum Miq.
- Canthium puberulum Thwaites ex Hook.f.
- Canthium quadratum Craib
- Canthium rheedei DC.
- Canthium sarcocarpum (Merr.) Merr.
- Canthium sarmentosum Craib
- Canthium scabridum Ridl.
- Canthium scandens Blume
- Canthium schlechterianum Merr. & L.M.Perry
- Canthium simile Merr. & Chun
- Canthium sordidum (K.Schum.) Bullock
- Canthium spirostylum Miq.
- Canthium stellulatum Craib
- Canthium strigosum Craib
- Canthium strychnoides Craib
- Canthium subaureum Craib
- Canthium subcapitatum (Merr.) Merr.
- Canthium suberosum Codd
- Canthium subsessilifolium (Merr.) Merr.
- Canthium tavoyanum (R.Parker) Merr.
- Canthium thonningii Benth.
- Canthium travancoricum Bedd.
- Canthium trichophorum Quisumb. & Merr.
- Canthium umbelligerum Miq.
- Canthium vanwykii Tilney & Kok
- Canthium villarii Vidal
- Canthium violaceum Zoll. & Moritzi
