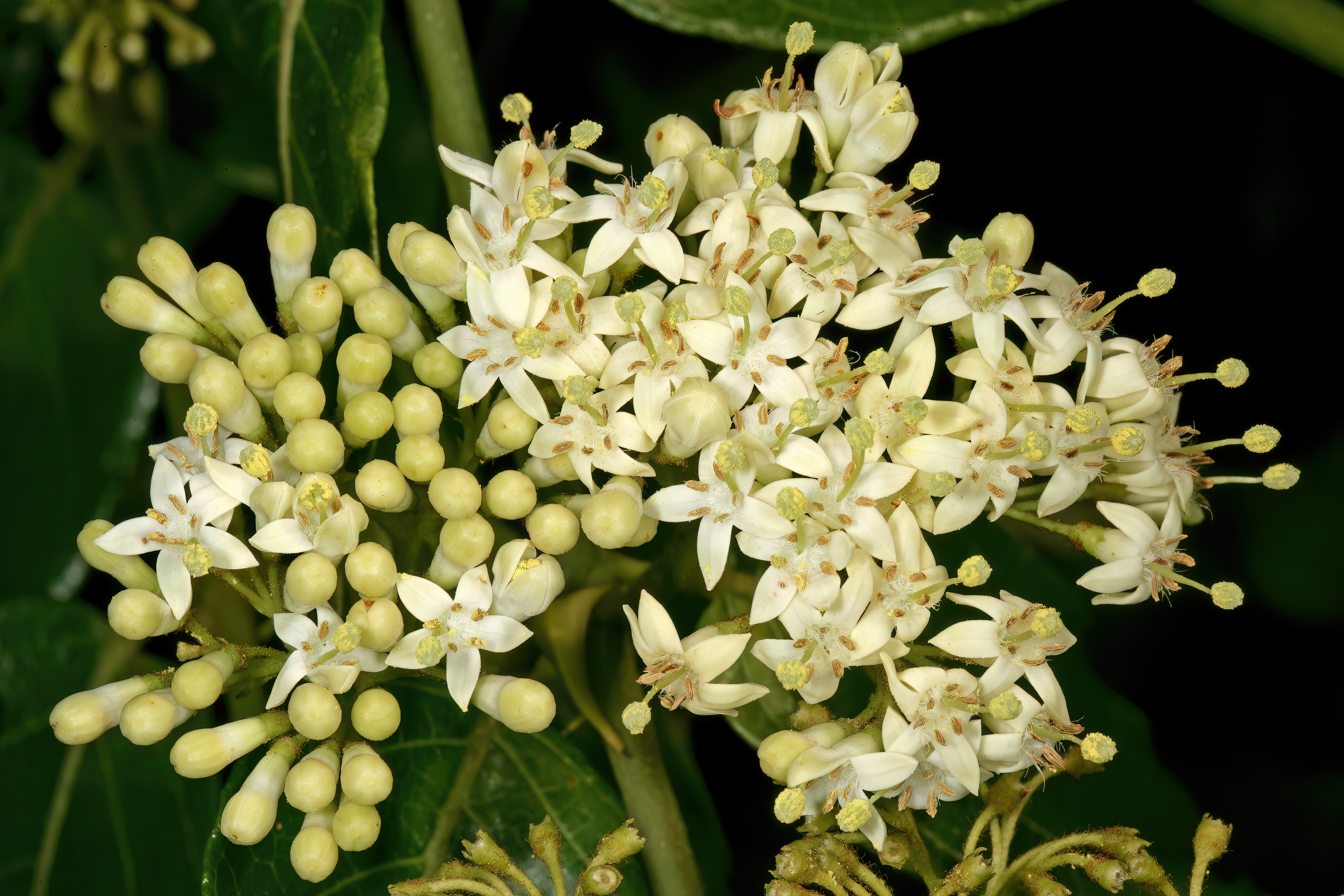

Scientific classification
- Kingdom: Plantae
- Clade: Tracheophytes
- Clade: Angiosperms
- Clade: Eudicots
- Clade: Asterids
- Order: Gentianales
- Family: Rubiaceae
- Genus: Keetia
- Species: K. gueinzii

Binomial name
- Keetia gueinzii (Sond.) Bridson

Synonyms
- Keetia transvaalensis Canthium gueinzii

= Keetia gueinzii =

Species of plant

Keetia gueinzii is an evergreen scandent shrub in the family Rubiaceae. The species epitheton is named after Wilhelm Gueinzius, a German naturalist who collected plants in South Africa. It became the type species of Keetia after the original type species, Keetia transvaalensis, was made a synonym. This species is found down the southern African east coast in Malawi, Zimbabwe, Mozambique and South Africa.

Young branches are covered with rust-coloured hairs. Leaves measure 5.5–13.5 × 3.5–6 cm, more or less lanceolate to ovate, acuminate apex, rounded to cordate at the base, often bullate, and glabrous to pubescent beneath. Acarodomatia present in the axils of the veins. Petioles are covered with crisped or patent hairs. Fruit 7–9 × 11–14 mm, somewhat oblong in profile, glabrous, black when ripe. It grows in the altitude range of 800–2200 m.
