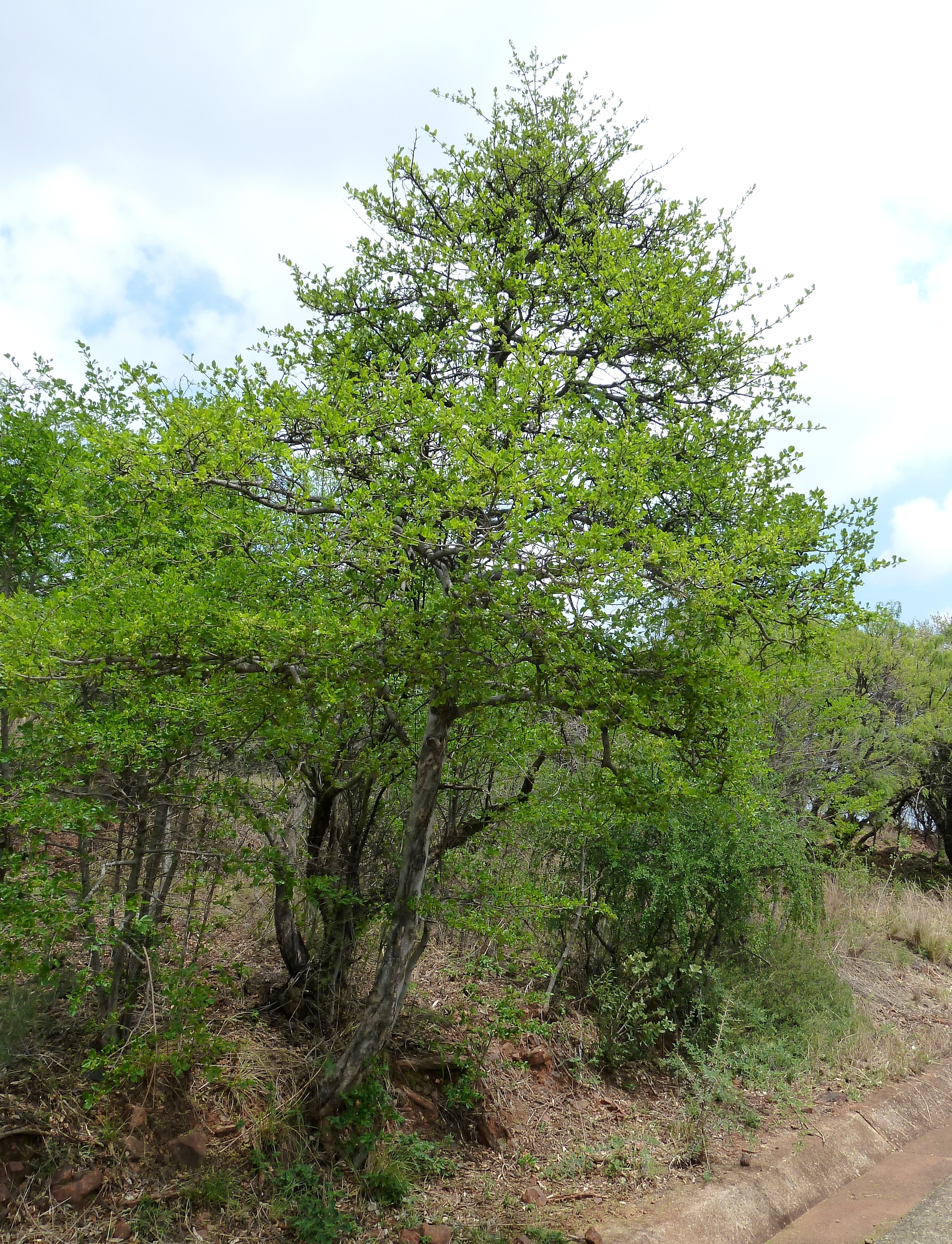
- A. gilfillanii in South Africa

Scientific classification
- Kingdom: Plantae
- Clade: Tracheophytes
- Clade: Angiosperms
- Clade: Eudicots
- Clade: Asterids
- Order: Gentianales
- Family: Rubiaceae
- Subfamily: Dialypetalanthoideae
- Tribe: Vanguerieae
- Genus: Afrocanthium (Bridson) Lantz & B.Bremer

Type species
- Afrocanthium lactescens (Hiern) Lantz

= Afrocanthium =

Genus of flowering plants

Afrocanthium is a genus of flowering plants in the family Rubiaceae. It consists of deciduous, unarmed trees, and shrubs. They are native to East Africa, from Sudan and Ethiopia to South Africa.

== Taxonomy ==
Afrocanthium was first recognized as a distinct group in 1991, when it was named as a subgenus of Canthium. It was described and compared to the other subgenera in 1992. In 2004, a molecular phylogenetic study of DNA sequences showed that Afrocanthium is monophyletic and not most closely related to the other subgenera of Canthium. The authors of this study raised Afrocanthium, unaltered, to generic status. It is sister to Keetia, a genus that was segregated from Canthium in 1986.

== Species ==
- Afrocanthium burttii (Bullock) Lantz
- Afrocanthium gilfillanii (N.E.Br.) Lantz
- Afrocanthium keniense (Bullock) Lantz
- Afrocanthium kilifiense (Bridson) Lantz
- Afrocanthium lactescens (Hiern) Lantz
- Afrocanthium mundianum (Cham. & Schltdl.) Lantz
- Afrocanthium ngonii (Bridson) Lantz
- Afrocanthium parasiebenlistii (Bridson) Lantz
- Afrocanthium peteri (Bridson) Lantz
- Afrocanthium pseudorandii (Bridson) Lantz
- Afrocanthium pseudoverticillatum (S.Moore) Lantz
- Afrocanthium racemulosum (S.Moore) Lantz
- Afrocanthium rondoense (Bridson) Lantz
- Afrocanthium salubenii (Bridson) Lantz
- Afrocanthium shabanii (Bridson) Lantz
- Afrocanthium siebenlistii (K.Krause) Lantz
- Afrocanthium vollesenii (Bridson) Lantz
