= Mesoptera =

Mesoptera is a name of a genus of plants. It can refer to:

- A name created in 1833 by Constantine Samuel Rafinesque for an Orchidaceae genus, a rejected name now considered synonymous with Liparis
- A name created in 1873 by Joseph Dalton Hooker, for a Rubiaceae genus, a conserved name, but now considered a synonym of Psydrax
