= Afrocanthium kilifiense =

Conservation status
- Near Threatened (IUCN 3.1)

Scientific classification
- Kingdom: Plantae
- Clade: Tracheophytes
- Clade: Angiosperms
- Clade: Eudicots
- Clade: Asterids
- Order: Gentianales
- Family: Rubiaceae
- Genus: Afrocanthium
- Species: A. kilifiense

Binomial name
- Afrocanthium kilifiense (Bridson) Lantz

Species of plant

Afrocanthium kilifiense is a species of shrub or small tree in the family Rubiaceae. It is known from the coast of Kenya and Tanzania where it grows in Brachystegia woodland and dry lowland forest.
