= Psydrax ficiformis =

Conservation status
- Endangered (IUCN 2.3)

Scientific classification
- Kingdom: Plantae
- Clade: Tracheophytes
- Clade: Angiosperms
- Clade: Eudicots
- Clade: Asterids
- Order: Gentianales
- Family: Rubiaceae
- Genus: Psydrax
- Species: P. ficiformis

Binomial name
- Psydrax ficiformis (Hook.f.) Bridson

Species of plant

Psydrax ficiformis is a species of flowering plant in the family Rubiaceae. It is endemic to southern India.
