= Afrocanthium vollesenii =

Conservation status
- Vulnerable (IUCN 3.1)

Scientific classification
- Kingdom: Plantae
- Clade: Tracheophytes
- Clade: Angiosperms
- Clade: Eudicots
- Clade: Asterids
- Order: Gentianales
- Family: Rubiaceae
- Genus: Afrocanthium
- Species: A. vollesenii

Binomial name
- Afrocanthium vollesenii (Bridson) Lantz

Synonyms
- Canthium vollesenii Bridson

Species of plant

Afrocanthium vollesenii is a species of flowering plant in the family Rubiaceae. It is endemic to Tanzania.
