= Multidentia sclerocarpa =

Conservation status
- Endangered (IUCN 3.1)

Scientific classification
- Kingdom: Plantae
- Clade: Tracheophytes
- Clade: Angiosperms
- Clade: Eudicots
- Clade: Asterids
- Order: Gentianales
- Family: Rubiaceae
- Genus: Multidentia
- Species: M. sclerocarpa

Binomial name
- Multidentia sclerocarpa (K.Schum.) Bridson

Species of plant

Multidentia sclerocarpa is a species of flowering plants in the family Rubiaceae. It is found in Kenya and Tanzania.
