= Psydrax micans =

Conservation status
- Vulnerable (IUCN 2.3)

Scientific classification
- Kingdom: Plantae
- Clade: Tracheophytes
- Clade: Angiosperms
- Clade: Eudicots
- Clade: Asterids
- Order: Gentianales
- Family: Rubiaceae
- Genus: Psydrax
- Species: P. micans

Binomial name
- Psydrax micans (Bullock) Bridson

Species of plant

Psydrax micans is a species of flowering plant in the family Rubiaceae . It is found in Mozambique and Tanzania.
