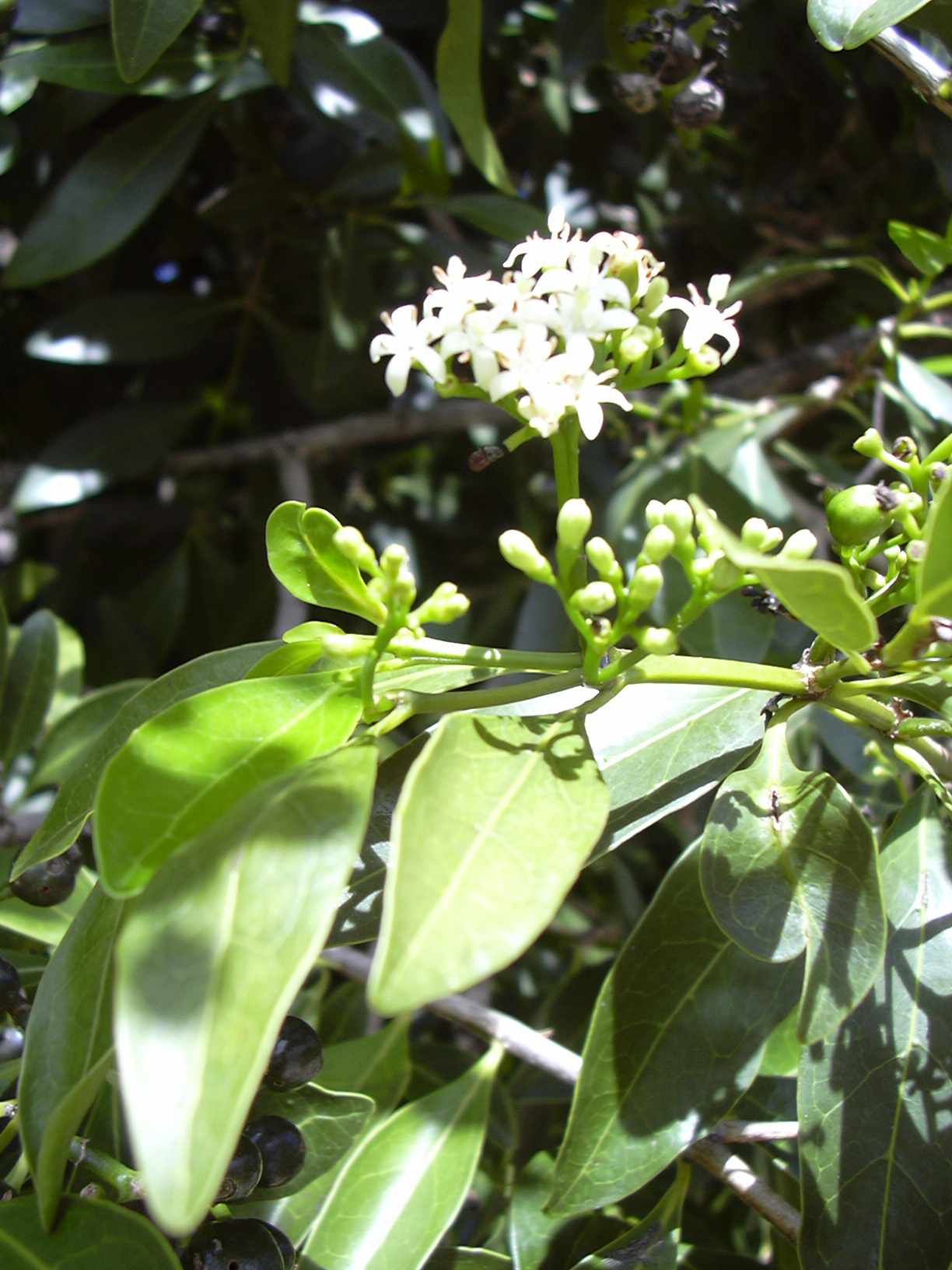
- Psydrax odorata

Scientific classification
- Kingdom: Plantae
- Clade: Tracheophytes
- Clade: Angiosperms
- Clade: Eudicots
- Clade: Asterids
- Order: Gentianales
- Family: Rubiaceae
- Subfamily: Dialypetalanthoideae
- Tribe: Vanguerieae
- Genus: Psydrax; Gaertn.

Type species
- Psydrax dicoccos Gaertn.

Synonyms
- Mesoptera Hook.f.; Mitrastigma Harv.; Phallaria Schumach. & Thonn.

= Psydrax =

Genus of flowering plants

Psydrax is a genus of flowering plants in the family Rubiaceae. It consists of trees, shrubs, and a few lianas in the paleotropics.

== Taxonomy ==
The genus was named by Joseph Gaertner in 1788 in his book, De Fructibus et Seminibus Plantarum. Psydrax is a Greek word meaning a blister or bump. Gaertner may have chosen this name to refer to the warty fruit or the pimply seeds of some species. The name was hardly ever used after Gaertner proposed it because most authors placed these species in Canthium. Psydrax was reinstated in 1985 and 37 African species were transferred to it from Canthium. The monospecific genus Mesoptera was also sunk into Psydrax. Psydrax was shown to be monophyletic in a molecular phylogenetic study. It is closely related to Afrocanthium, Cyclophyllum and Keetia, genera that have been segregated from Canthium.

== Species ==
- Psydrax acutiflora (Hiern) Bridson
- Psydrax ammophila S.T.Reynolds & R.J.F.Hend.
- Psydrax amplifolia (Elmer)A.P.Davis
- Psydrax ankotekonensis (Cavaco) A.P.Davis & Bridson
- Psydrax approximatus (Korth.) Mahyuni & K.M.Wong
- Psydrax arnoldiana (De Wild. & T.Durand) Bridson
- Psydrax attenuata (R.Br. ex Benth.) S.T.Reynolds & R.J.F.Hend.
- Psydrax austro-orientalis (Cavaco) A.P.Davis & Bridson
- Psydrax banksii S.T.Reynolds & R.J.F.Hend.
- Psydrax bathieana (Cavaco)A.P.Davis & Bridson
- Psydrax bridsoniana Cheek & Sonké
- Psydrax calcicola (Craib)A.P.Davis
- Psydrax capensis J.C.Manning & Goldblatt
- Psydrax cymigera (Valeton)S.T.Reynolds & R.J.F.Hend.
- Psydrax dicoccos Gaertn.
- Psydrax dunlapii (Hutch. & Dalziel) Bridson
- Psydrax esirensis (Cavaco) A.P.Davis & Bridson
- Psydrax fasciculata (Blume) A.P.Davis
- Psydrax faulknerae Bridson
- Psydrax ficiformis (Hook.f.) Bridson
- Psydrax forsteri S.T.Reynolds & R.J.F.Hend.
- Psydrax fragrantissima (K.Schum.) Bridson
- Psydrax gilletii (De Wild.) Bridson
- Psydrax graciliflora (Merr. & L.M.Perry) S.T.Reynolds & R.J.F.Hend.
- Psydrax grandifolia (Thwaites) Ridsdale
- Psydrax graniticola (Chiov.) Bridson
- Psydrax gynochthodes (Baill.) Arriola, Yayen & Alejandro
- Psydrax horizontalis (SChumach. & Thonn.) Bridson
- Psydrax johnsonii S.T.Reynolds & R.J.F.Hend.
- Psydrax kaessneri (S.Moore) Bridson
- Psydrax kibuwae Bridson
- Psydrax kingii (Hook.f.) Bridson & Springate
- Psydrax kraussioides (Hiern) Bridson
- Psydrax lamprophylla (F.Muell.) Bridson
- Psydrax latifolia (F.Muell. ex Benth.) S.T.Reynolds & R.J.F.Hend.
- Psydrax laxiflorens S.T.Reynolds & R.J.F.Hend.
- Psydrax lepida S.T.Reynolds & R.J.F.Hend.
- Psydrax livida (Hiern) Bridson
- Psydrax locuples (K.Schum.) Bridson
- Psydrax longipes S.T.Reynolds & R.J.F.Hend.
- Psydrax longistyla (Merr.) A.P.Davis
- Psydrax lucidulus (Miq.) Mahyuni & K.M.Wong
- Psydrax lynesii Bullock ex Bridson
- Psydrax maingayi (Hook.f.) Bridson
- Psydrax manambyana (Cavaco) A.P.Davis & Bridson
- Psydrax manensis (Aubrév. & Pellegr.) Bridson
- Psydrax martini (Dunkley) Bridson
- Psydrax micans (Bullock) Bridson
- Psydrax moandensis Bridson
- Psydrax moggii Bridson
- Psydrax montana (Thwaites) Ridsdale
- Psydrax montigena S.T.Reynolds & R.J.F.Hend.
- Psydrax multiflorus Arriola & Alejandro
- Psydrax mutimushii Bridson
- Psydrax nitida (Craib) K.M.Wong
- Psydrax obovatus (Klotzsch ex Eckl. & Zeyh.) Bridson
- Psydrax occidentalis (Cavaco) A.P.Davis & Bridson
- Psydrax odorata (G.Forst.) A.C.Sm. & S.P.Darwin
- Psydrax oleifolia (Hook.) S.T.Reynolds & R.J.F.Hend.
- Psydrax pallida S.T.Reynolds & R.J.F.Hend.
- Psydrax palma (K.Schum.) Bridson
- Psydrax paludosa S.T.Reynolds & R.J.F.Hend.
- Psydrax paradoxa (Virot) Mouly
- Psydrax parviflora (Afzel.) Bridson
- Psydrax pendulina S.T.Reynolds & R.J.F.Hend.
- Psydrax pergracilis (Bourd.) Ridsdale
- Psydrax polhillii Bridson
- Psydrax puberula Arriola & Alejandro
- Psydrax recurvifolia (Bullock) Bridson
- Psydrax reticulata (C.T.White) S.T.Reynolds & R.J.F.Hend.
- Psydrax richardsiae Bridson
- Psydrax rigidula S.T.Reynolds & R.J.F.Hend.
- Psydrax robertsoniae Bridson
- Psydrax sabahensi Mahyuni
- Psydrax saligna S.T.Reynolds & R.J.F.Hend.
- Psydrax sambiranensis (Cavaco) A.P.Davis & Bridson
- Psydrax schimperiana (A.Rich.) Bridson
- Psydrax sepikensis A.P.Davis
- Psydrax shuguriensis Bridson
- Psydrax splendens (K.Schum.) Bridson
- Psydrax suaveolens (S.Moore) S.T.Reynolds & R.J.F.Hend.
- Psydrax subcordata (DC.) Bridson
- Psydrax suborbicularis (C.T.White) S.T.Reynolds & R.J.F.Hend.
- Psydrax sumatranus (Miq.) Mahyuni
- Psydrax tropica S.T.Reynolds & R.J.F.Hend.
- Psydrax umbellata (Wight) Bridson
- Psydrax undulatifolius K.M.Wong & Mahyuni
- Psydrax virgata (Hiern) Bridson
- Psydrax whitei Bridson
- Psydrax wongii Mahyuni
