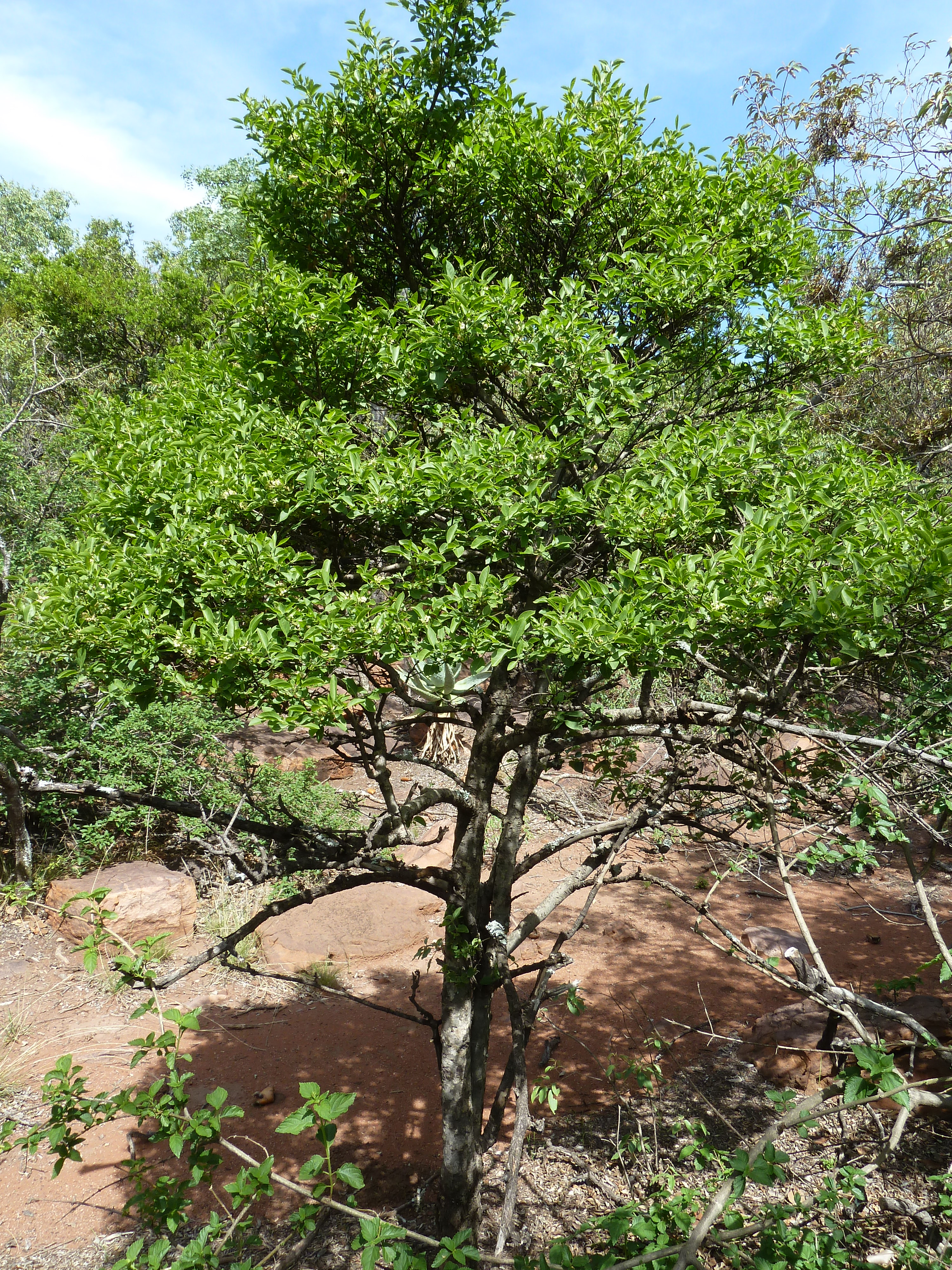
- In northern Gauteng, South Africa

Scientific classification
- Kingdom: Plantae
- Clade: Tracheophytes
- Clade: Angiosperms
- Clade: Eudicots
- Clade: Asterids
- Order: Gentianales
- Family: Rubiaceae
- Genus: Psydrax
- Species: P. livida

Binomial name
- Psydrax livida (Hiern) Bridson

Synonyms
- Canthium clityophyllum Bullock; C. gymnosporioides Launert; C. huillense Hiern; Plectronia heliotropiodora K.Schum. & K.Krause; P. huillensis (Hiern) K.Schum.; P. junodii Burtt Davy; et al.

= Psydrax livida =

Green-twigs quar

Species of tree

Psydrax livida (green-twigs quar) is an Afrotropical shrub or small tree in the family Rubiaceae. It occurs in eastern and southern Africa, including Burundi, Kenya, the DRC, Tanzania, Malawi, Mozambique, Zambia, Zimbabwe, Angola, Botswana, northern Namibia and northern South Africa. It is deciduous or evergreen, and its green branches have an opposite and horizontal arrangement.

== Gallery ==
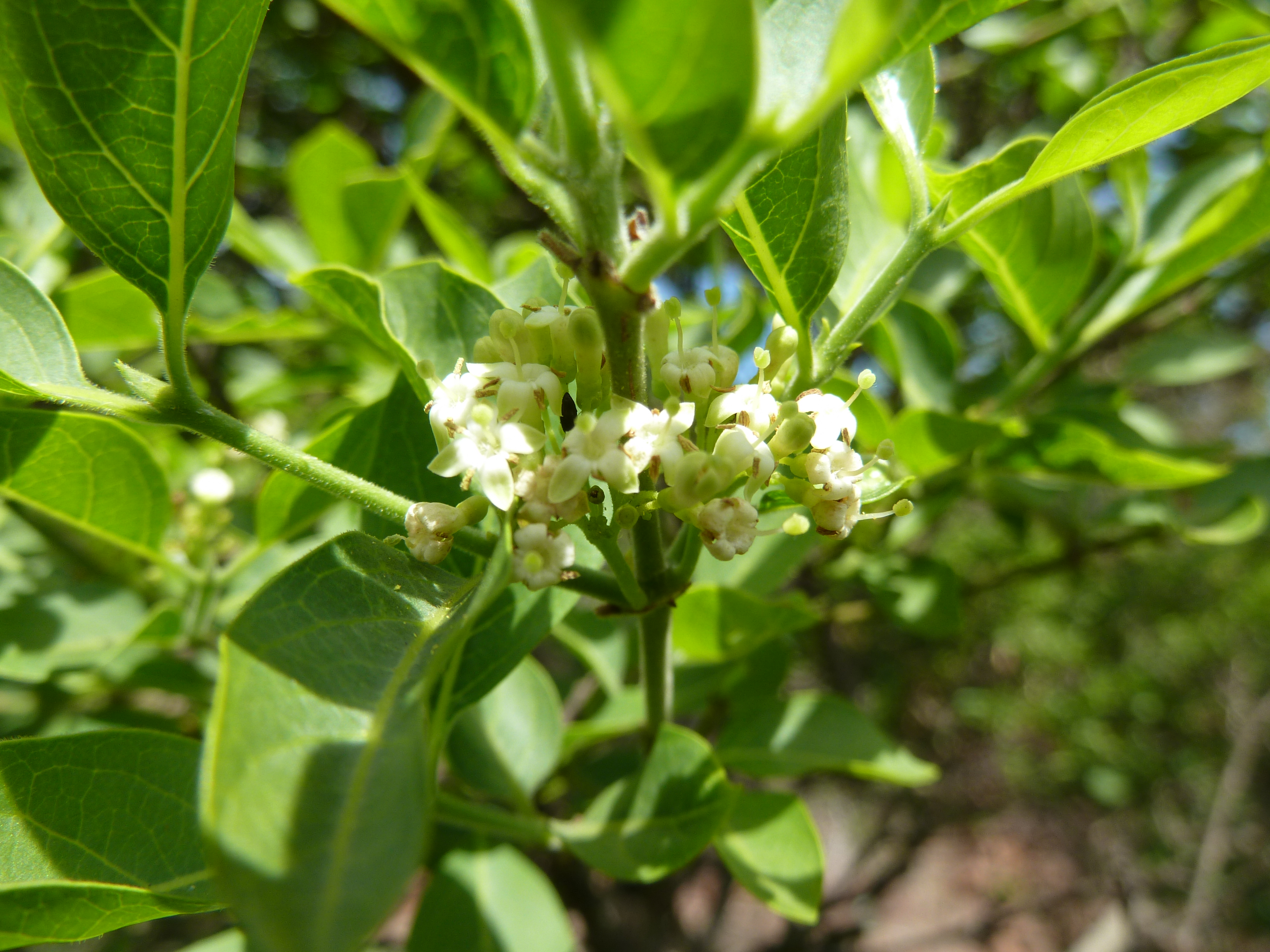
Inflorescence

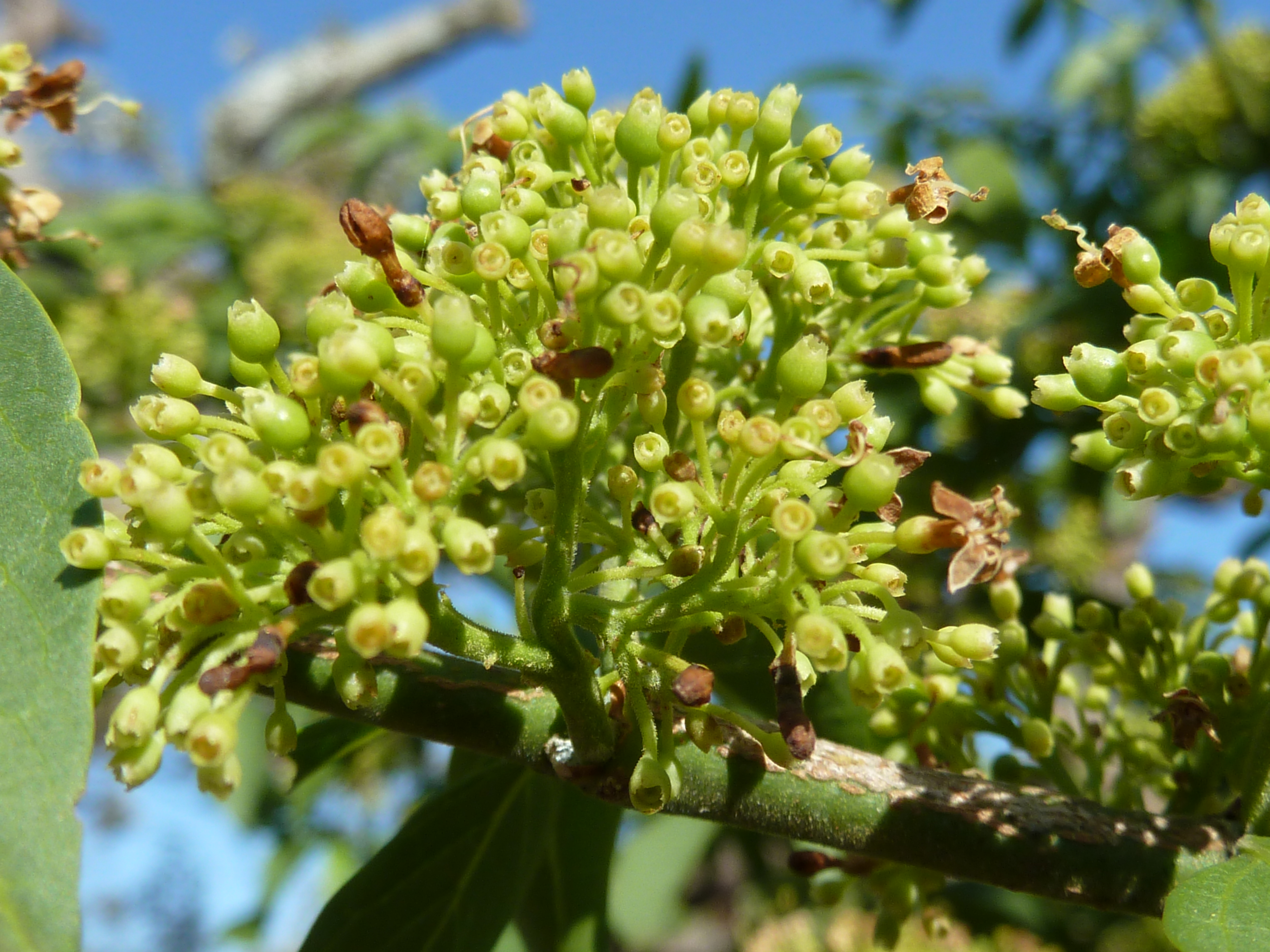
Infrutescence

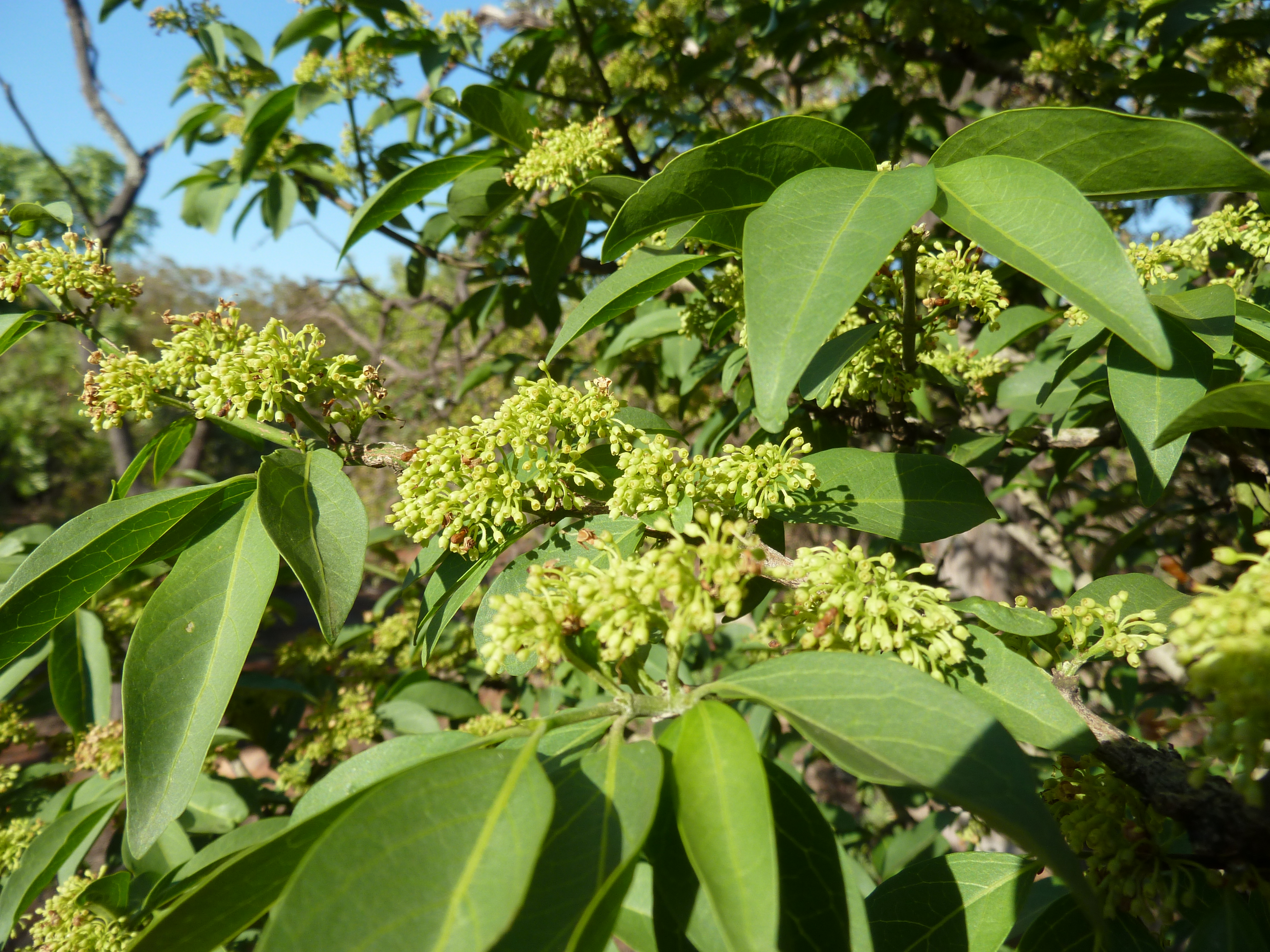
Foliage and infrutescences
