= Afrocanthium shabanii =

Conservation status
- Endangered (IUCN 3.1)

Scientific classification
- Kingdom: Plantae
- Clade: Tracheophytes
- Clade: Angiosperms
- Clade: Eudicots
- Clade: Asterids
- Order: Gentianales
- Family: Rubiaceae
- Genus: Afrocanthium
- Species: A. shabanii

Binomial name
- Afrocanthium shabanii (Bridson) Lantz

Species of plant

Afrocanthium shabanii is a species of flowering plant in the family Rubiaceae. It is endemic to Tanga Region Tanzania.
