= Keetia purpurascens =

Conservation status
- Endangered (IUCN 3.1)

Scientific classification
- Kingdom: Plantae
- Clade: Tracheophytes
- Clade: Angiosperms
- Clade: Eudicots
- Clade: Asterids
- Order: Gentianales
- Family: Rubiaceae
- Genus: Keetia
- Species: K. purpurascens

Binomial name
- Keetia purpurascens (Bullock) Bridson

Species of plant

Keetia purpurascens is a species of flowering plants in the family Rubiaceae. It is endemic to Tanzania.
