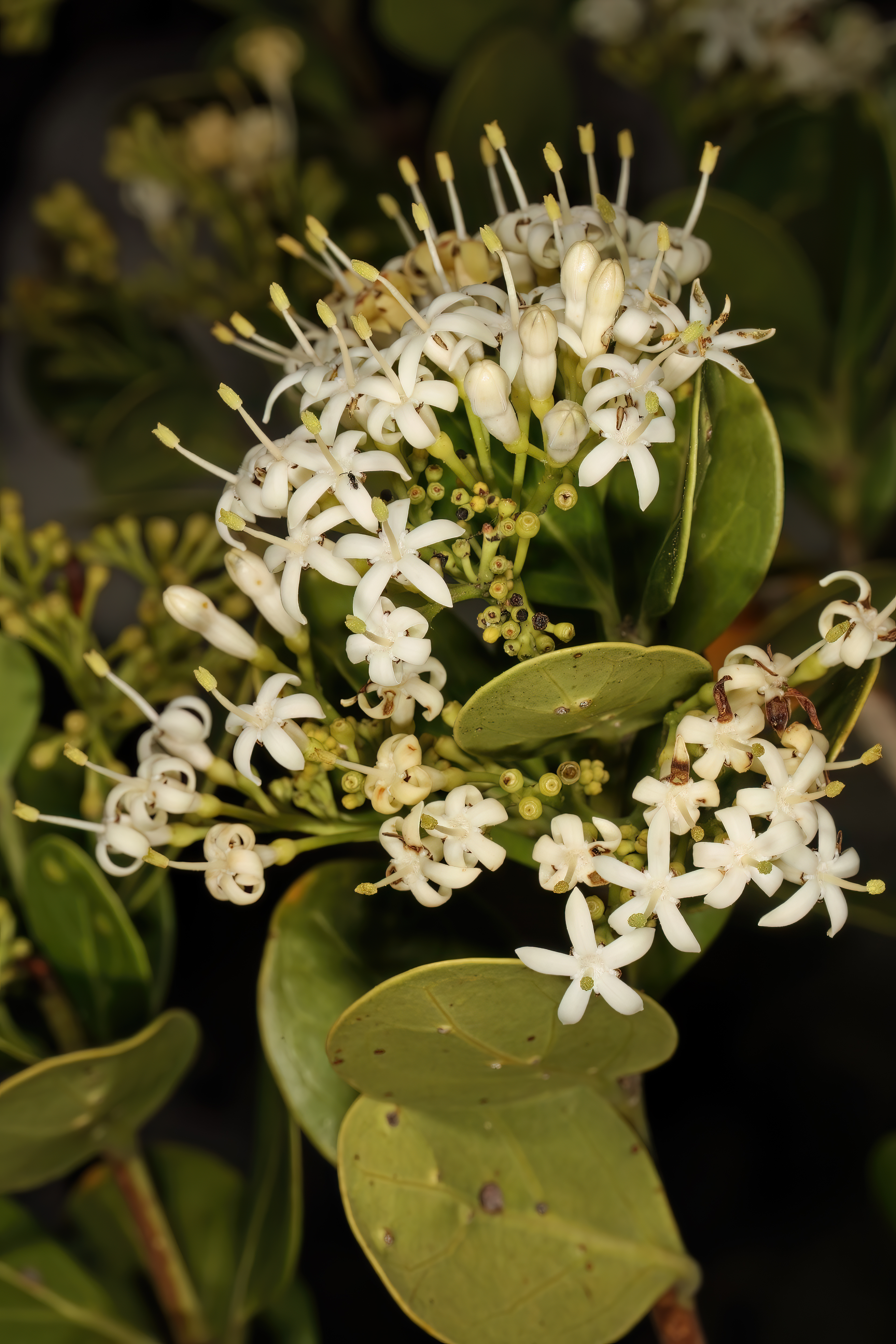
- Psydrax obovatus

Scientific classification
- Kingdom: Plantae
- Clade: Tracheophytes
- Clade: Angiosperms
- Clade: Eudicots
- Clade: Asterids
- Order: Gentianales
- Family: Rubiaceae
- Subfamily: Dialypetalanthoideae
- Tribe: Vanguerieae
- Genus: Psydrax
- Species: P. obovatus

Binomial name
- Psydrax obovatus (Klotzsch ex Eckl. & Zeyh.) Bridson (1985)

Subspecies
- Psydrax obovatus subsp. ellipticus Bridson; Psydrax obovatus subsp. obovatus

Synonyms
- of the species: Plectronia obovata (Klotzsch ex Eckl. & Zeyh.) Sim (1907); Canthium obovatum Klotzsch ex Eckl. & Zeyh. (1837); of subsp. obovatus: Canthium obovatum var. pyrifolium (Klotzsch ex Eckl. & Zeyh.) Sond. (1865); Canthium pyrifolium Klotzsch ex Eckl. & Zeyh. (1837); Mitrastigma lucidum Harv. (1842); Psychotria obtusifolia E.Mey. (1843)

= Psydrax obovatus =

Genus of plants

Psydrax obovatus is a species of flowering plant in the family Rubiaceae. It is a shrub or tree native to southern Africa, where it ranges from the Cape Provinces to KwaZulu-Natal, the Northern Provinces, Mozambique, and Zimbabwe.

Two subspecies are accepted:

- Psydrax obovatus subsp. ellipticus Bridson – Mozambique, Northern Provinces, and Zimbabwe
- Psydrax obovatus subsp. obovatus – Cape Provinces, KwaZulu-Natal, Mozambique, and Northern Provinces
