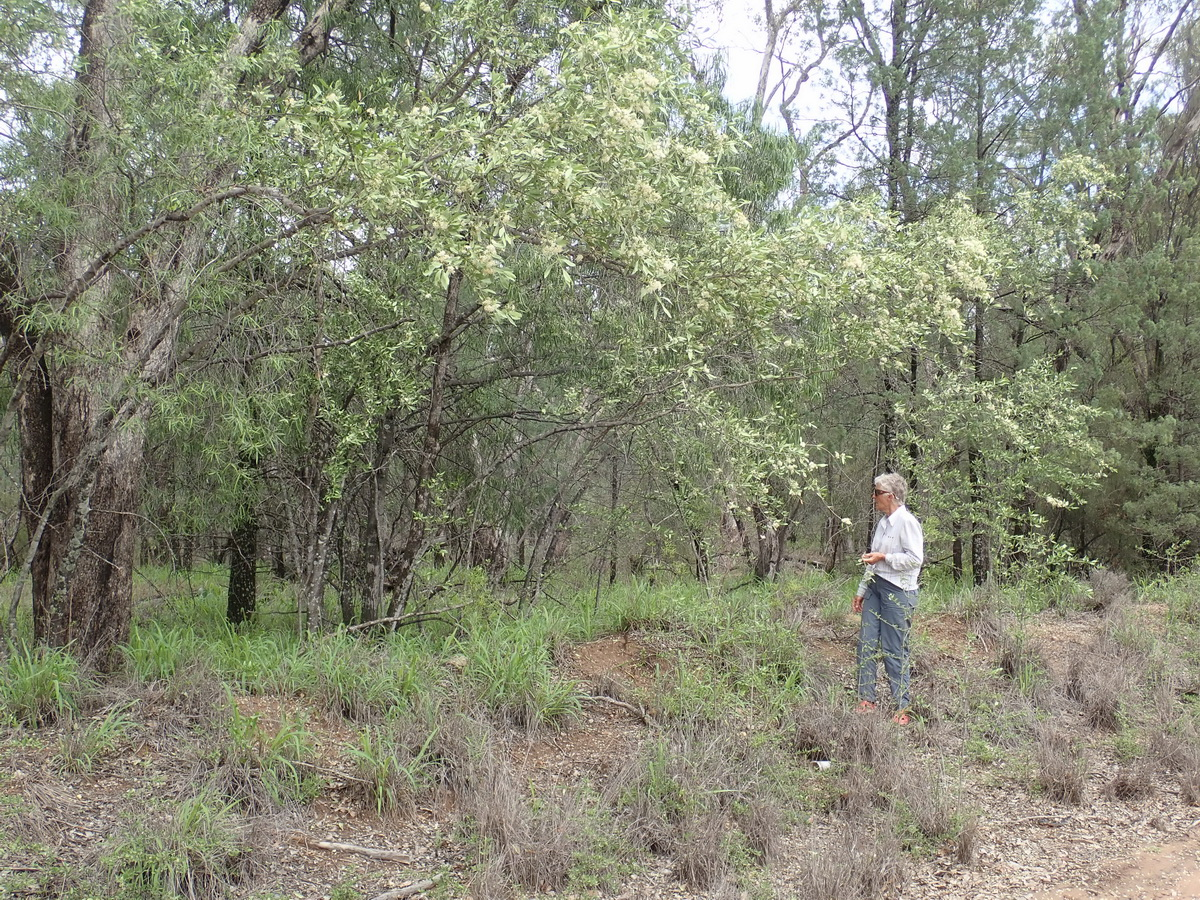
- Stand of P.oleifolia near Turrawan

Scientific classification
- Kingdom: Plantae
- Clade: Tracheophytes
- Clade: Angiosperms
- Clade: Eudicots
- Clade: Asterids
- Order: Gentianales
- Family: Rubiaceae
- Genus: Psydrax
- Species: P. oleifolia

Binomial name
- Psydrax oleifolia (Hook.) S.T.Reynolds & R.J.F.Hend.
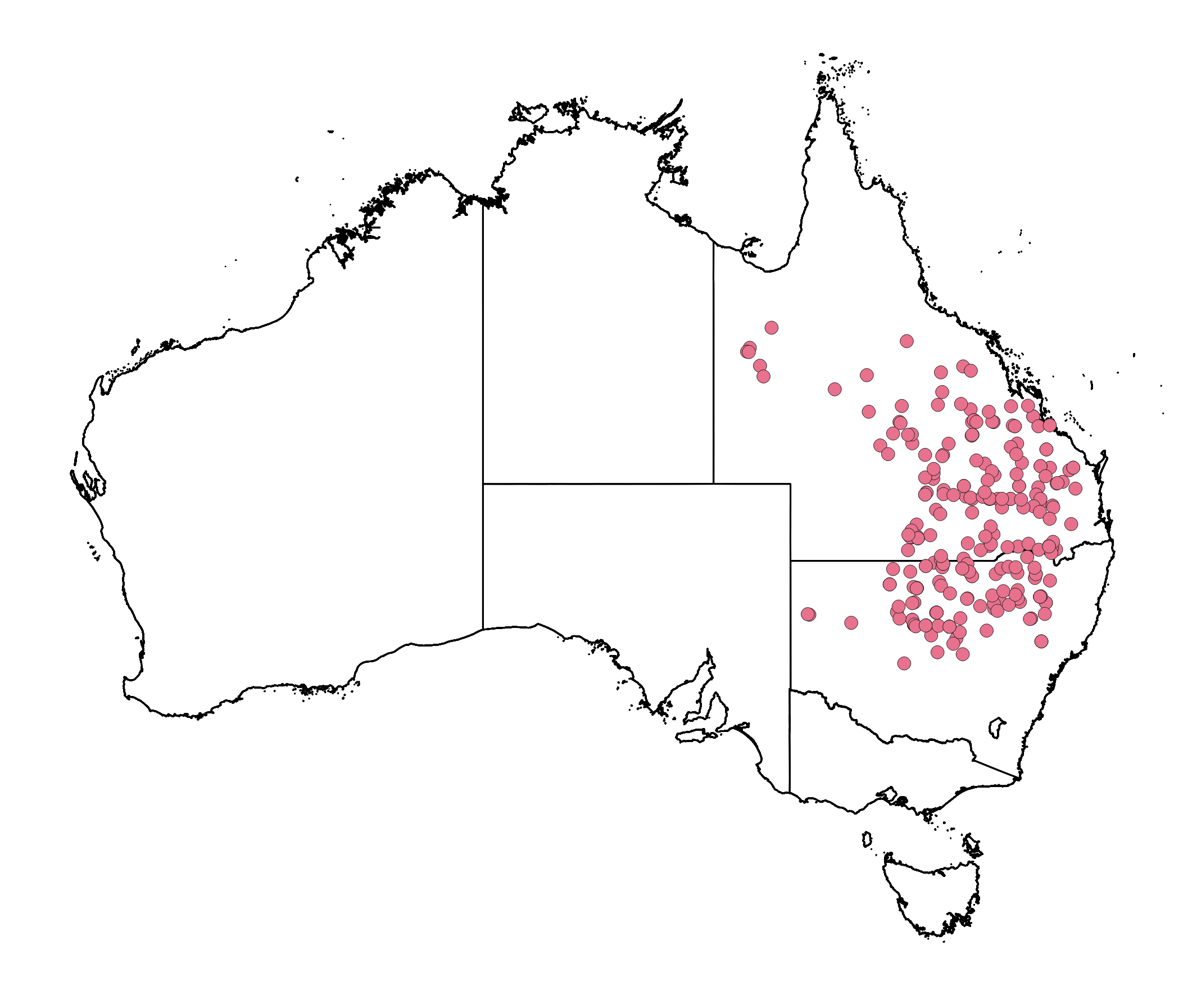
- Occurrence data from AVH

Synonyms
- Canthium oleifolium Hook.

= Psydrax oleifolia =

Species of plant

Psydrax oleifolia, commonly known as wild lemon or brush myrtle, is a species of shrub or small tree in the family Rubiaceae. It is endemic to eastern and inland Australia, (Queensland and New South Wales).

== Description ==
Psydrax oleifolia is a small tree or shrub which can grow up to 7 m high. The bark is grey. The trunk is erect and the stiff branches are roughly horizontal branches. The juvenile plants often have large spines.

The leaves are roughly erect, and 4.5–6.5 cm long by 17–24 mm wide. They have an obtuse apex and a lamina which is yellowish green or pale green. Their venation is obscure and they are thick and leathery on petioles of about 1 cm.

The fragrant flowers are few to many, in dense cymose panicles to 2.6 cm long and 1.5–4.0 cm across, with 23–39 flowers. The calyx is 1–2 mm long, and 4- or 5-lobed. The white corolla has a tube which is 1.5–2 mm long and four to five lobes which are 3–5 mm long. The stigma is mitre-shaped. The fruit is a black drupe which is about 6 mm wide.

== Image gallery ==
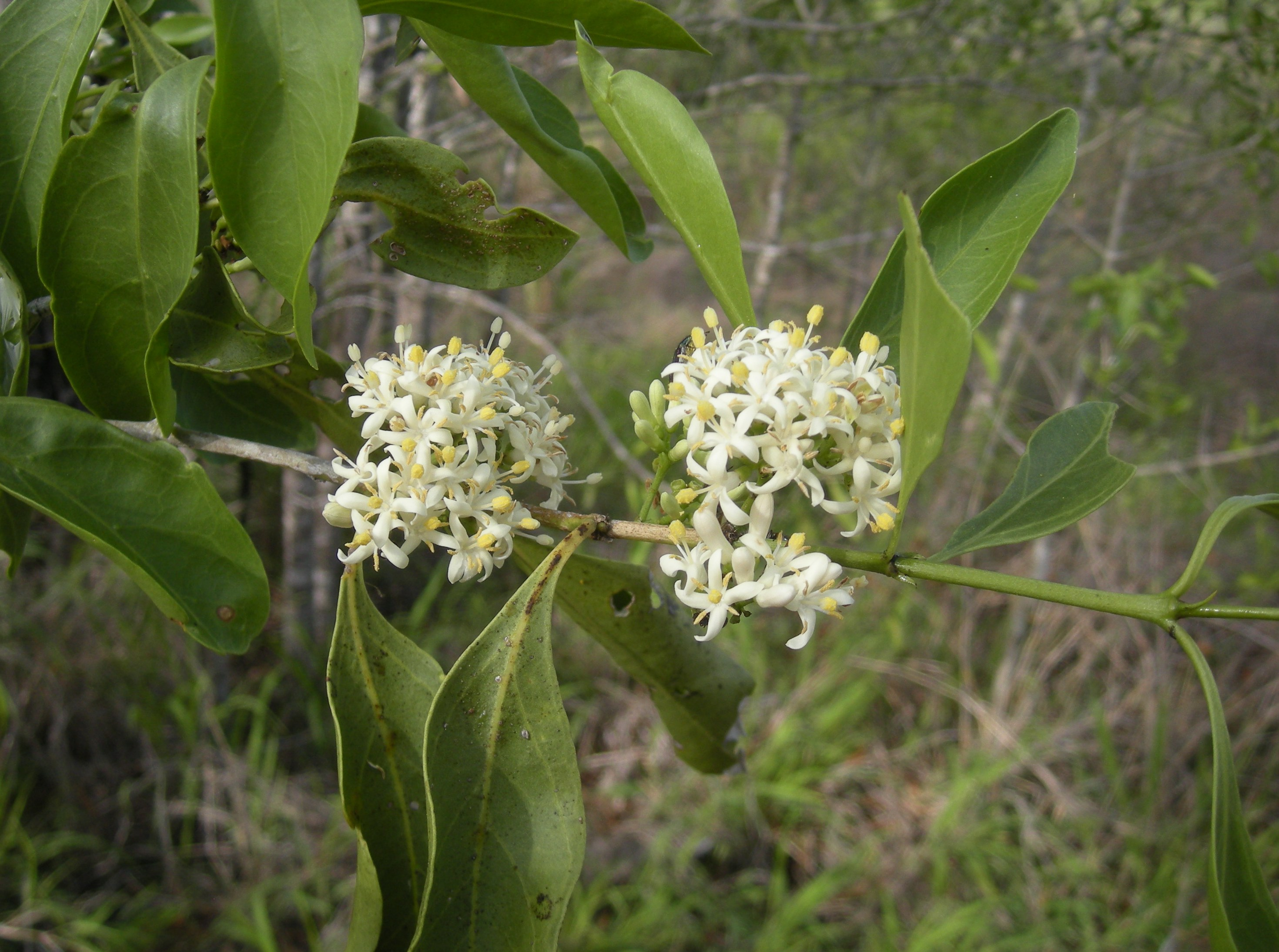
Psydrax oleifolia flowers

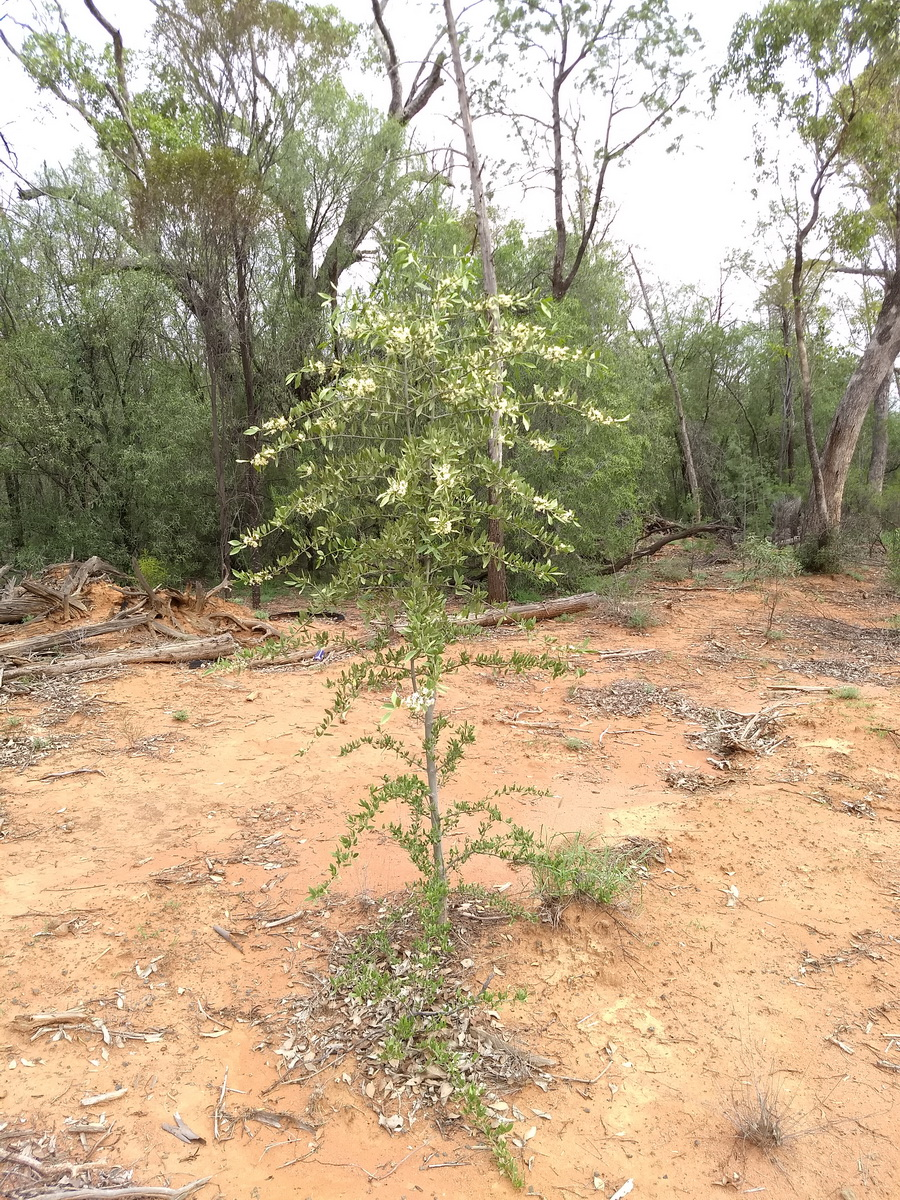
Horizontal branches

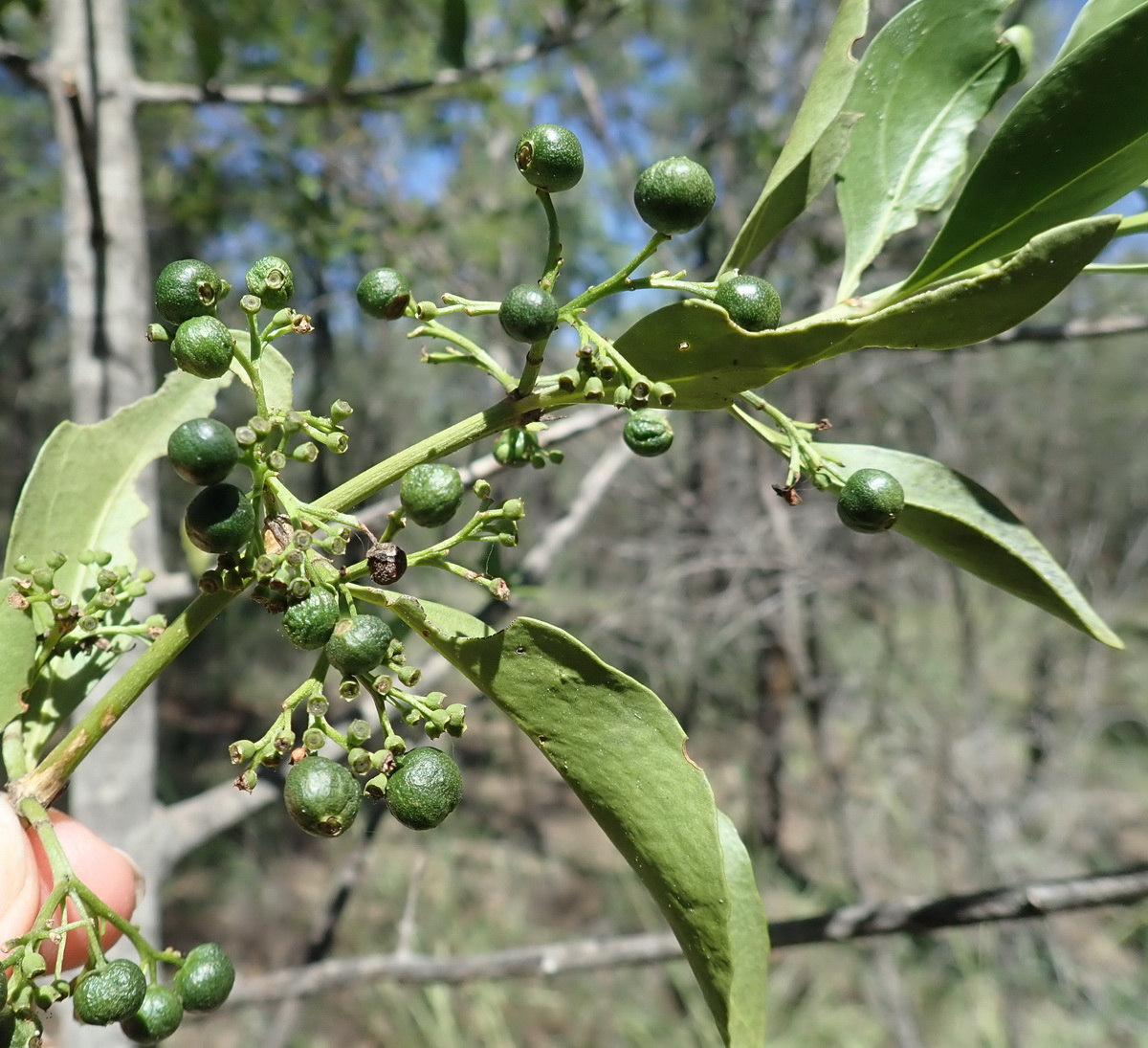
Developing fruit
