= Psydrax bridsoniana =

Conservation status
- Endangered (IUCN 3.1)

Scientific classification
- Kingdom: Plantae
- Clade: Tracheophytes
- Clade: Angiosperms
- Clade: Eudicots
- Clade: Asterids
- Order: Gentianales
- Family: Rubiaceae
- Genus: Psydrax
- Species: P. bridsoniana

Binomial name
- Psydrax bridsoniana Cheek & Sonké

Species of plant

Psydrax bridsoniana is a species of flowering plant in the family Rubiaceae. It is endemic to Cameroon. Its natural habitat is subtropical or tropical moist lowland forests. It is threatened by habitat loss.
