= Psydrax suborbicularis =

Conservation status
- Endangered (IUCN 3.1)

Scientific classification
- Kingdom: Plantae
- Clade: Tracheophytes
- Clade: Angiosperms
- Clade: Eudicots
- Clade: Asterids
- Order: Gentianales
- Family: Rubiaceae
- Genus: Psydrax
- Species: P. suborbicularis

Binomial name
- Psydrax suborbicularis (C.T.White) S.T.Reynolds & R.J.F.Hend.

Species of plant

Psydrax suborbicularis is a species of flowering plant in the family Rubiaceae. It is endemic to Papua New Guinea.
