= Afrocanthium pseudoverticillatum =

Conservation status
- Least Concern (IUCN 3.1)

Scientific classification
- Kingdom: Plantae
- Clade: Tracheophytes
- Clade: Angiosperms
- Clade: Eudicots
- Clade: Asterids
- Order: Gentianales
- Family: Rubiaceae
- Genus: Afrocanthium
- Species: A. pseudoverticillatum

Binomial name
- Afrocanthium pseudoverticillatum (S.Moore) Lantz

Species of plant

Afrocanthium pseudoverticillatum is a species of shrub or small tree in the family Rubiaceae. It is found from Somalia, Kenya, Tanzania and Mozambique. It grows in bushland areas.
