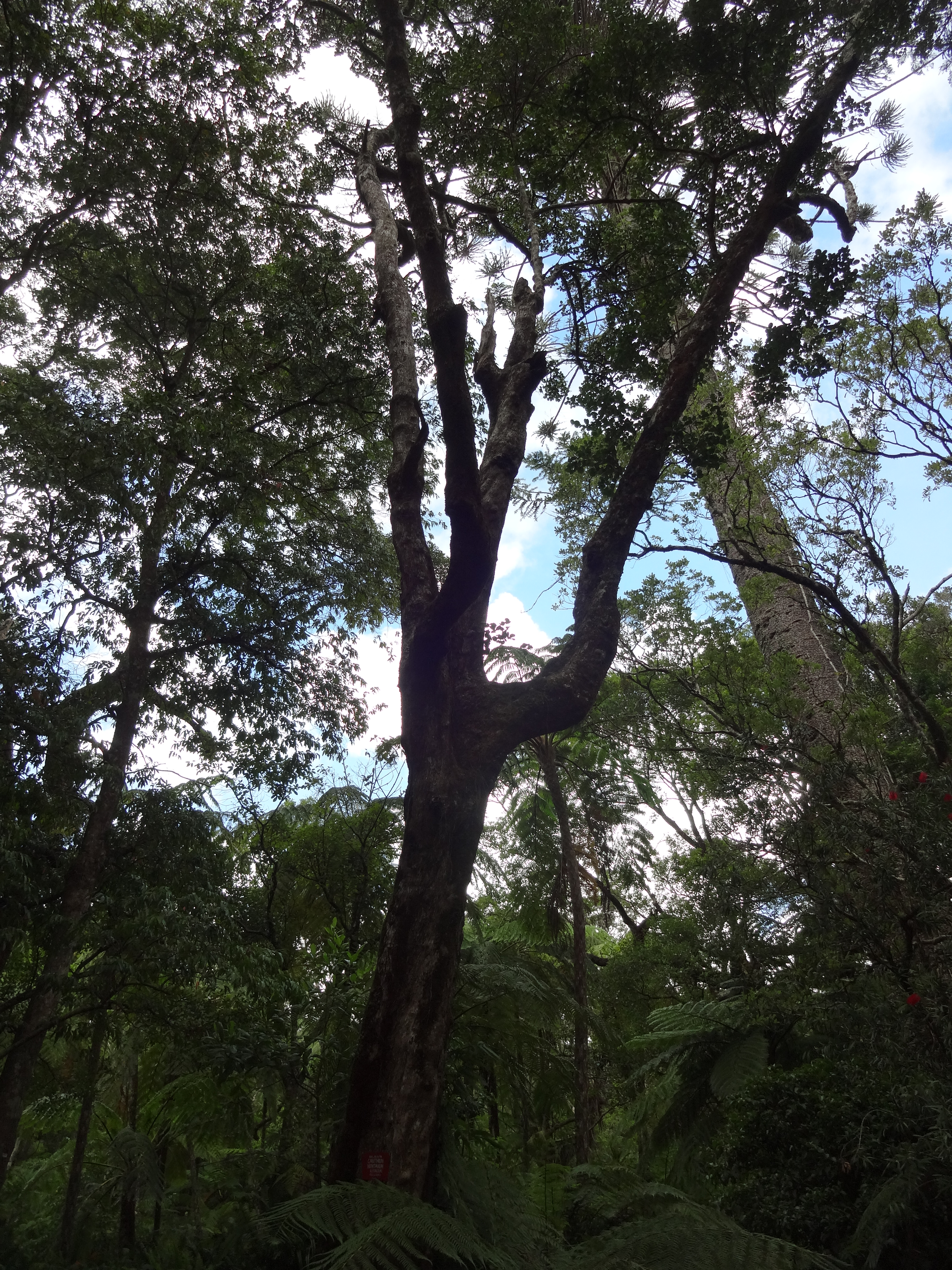
- Psydrax montana in Hakgale Botanical Garden

Conservation status
- Vulnerable (IUCN 2.3)

Scientific classification
- Kingdom: Plantae
- Clade: Tracheophytes
- Clade: Angiosperms
- Clade: Eudicots
- Clade: Asterids
- Order: Gentianales
- Family: Rubiaceae
- Genus: Psydrax
- Species: P. montana

Binomial name
- Psydrax montana (Thwaites) Ridsdale

Synonyms
- Canthium montanum Thwaites

= Psydrax montana =

Species of plant

Psydrax montana is a species of flowering plant in the family Rubiaceae. It is endemic to Sri Lanka.

The Latin specific epithet montana refers to mountains or coming from mountains.

== Culture ==
Known as "වල් බුරුත - wal burutha (meaning wild satin)" in Sinhala.
