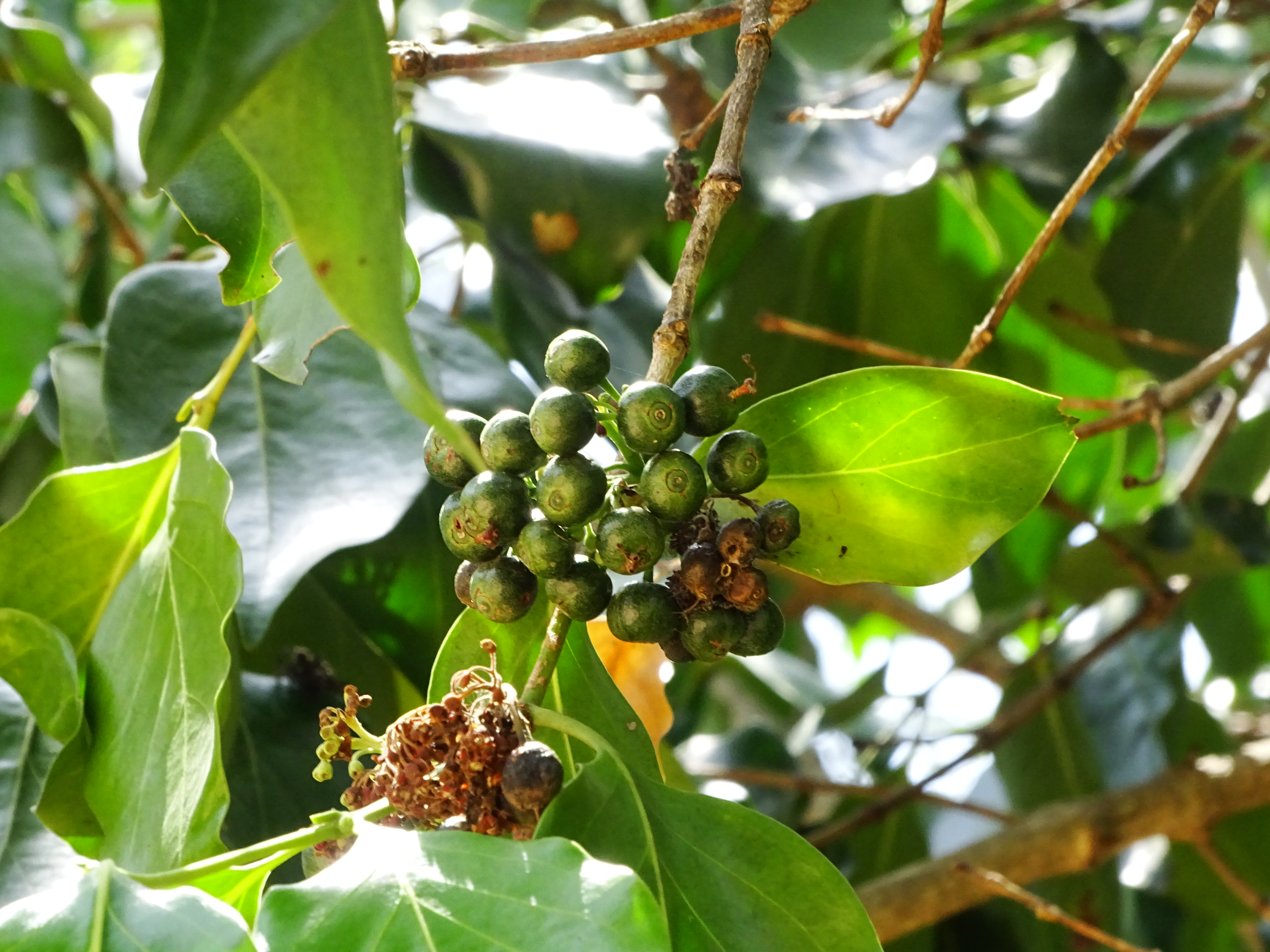

Conservation status
- Vulnerable (IUCN 2.3)

Scientific classification
- Kingdom: Plantae
- Clade: Tracheophytes
- Clade: Angiosperms
- Clade: Eudicots
- Clade: Asterids
- Order: Gentianales
- Family: Rubiaceae
- Genus: Psydrax
- Species: P. dicoccos

Binomial name
- Psydrax dicoccos Gaertn.

Synonyms
- Canthium dicoccum (Gaertn.) Merr.

= Psydrax dicoccos =

Species of plant

Psydrax dicoccos is a species of flowering plant in the family Rubiaceae. It is found from southeast China to tropical Asia.

== Botany ==
Commonly known as 'Ceylon box wood' or 'malakafe', it is an unarmed, smooth shrub 3 to 4 metres (9.8 to 13.1 ft) or more in height. Leaves are extremely variable, ovate, elliptic, ovate or somewhat rounded, 5 to 15 centimeters long, 1.5 to 10 centimeters wide, leathery, shining above, and usually pointed at both ends. Flowers are white, with very slender stalks, 5 to 10 millimeters long, and borne in compressed, short-stalked cymes. Calyx is cut off at the end or obscurely toothed. Corolla is bell-shaped, with a 4- to 6-millimeter tube, and five somewhat pointed lobes. Fruit is rounded, ellipsoid or obovoid, 6 to 10 millimeters long, slightly flattened and obscurely two-lobed.
