= Afrocanthium keniense =

Conservation status
- Vulnerable (IUCN 3.1)

Scientific classification
- Kingdom: Plantae
- Clade: Tracheophytes
- Clade: Angiosperms
- Clade: Eudicots
- Clade: Asterids
- Order: Gentianales
- Family: Rubiaceae
- Genus: Afrocanthium
- Species: A. keniense

Binomial name
- Afrocanthium keniense (Bullock) Lantz

Synonyms
- Canthium keniense Bullock

Species of plant

Afrocanthium keniense is a species of flowering plant in the family Rubiaceae. It is native to Kenya and Tanzania. It is threatened by habitat loss.

== Taxonomy ==
In 2004, a molecular phylogenetic study of DNA sequences found the genus Canthium to be polyphyletic. The authors of this study transferred 20 species, including Canthium keniense, to a new genus, Afrocanthium.
