= Psydrax paradoxa =

Conservation status
- Vulnerable (IUCN 2.3)

Scientific classification
- Kingdom: Plantae
- Clade: Tracheophytes
- Clade: Angiosperms
- Clade: Eudicots
- Clade: Asterids
- Order: Gentianales
- Family: Rubiaceae
- Genus: Psydrax
- Species: P. paradoxa

Binomial name
- Psydrax paradoxa (Virot) Mouly

Species of plant

Psydrax paradoxa is a species of plant in the family Rubiaceae. It is endemic to New Caledonia.
