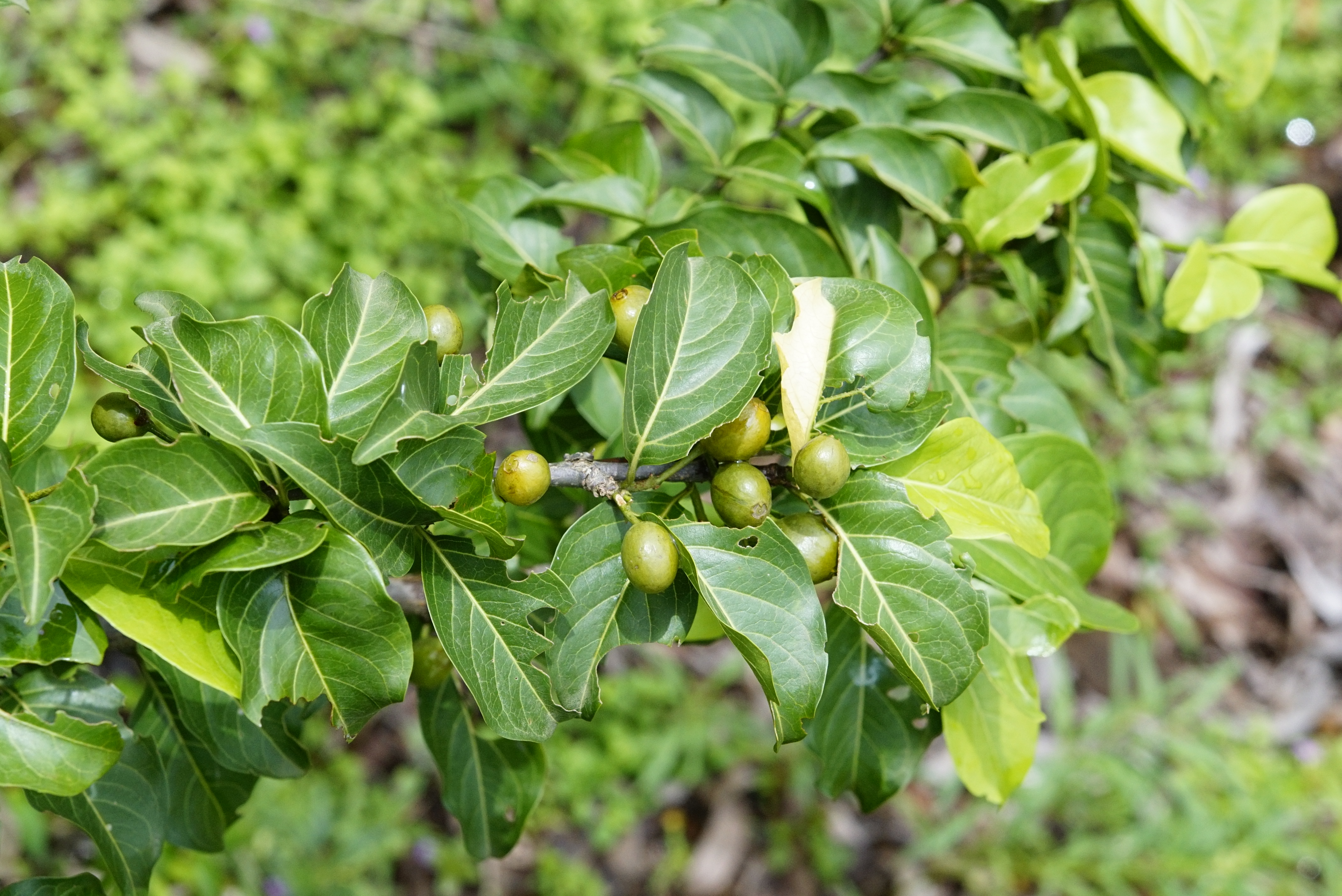
- Canthium coromandelicum in Kerala, India

Scientific classification
- Kingdom: Plantae
- Clade: Tracheophytes
- Clade: Angiosperms
- Clade: Eudicots
- Clade: Asterids
- Order: Gentianales
- Family: Rubiaceae
- Genus: Canthium
- Species: C. coromandelicum

Binomial name
- Canthium coromandelicum (Burm.f.) Alston

= Canthium coromandelicum =

Species of plant

Canthium coromandelicum, also known as Karai, is a bushy thorny suffruticose herb, a native of India found mainly in the Coromandel region.

== Description ==
Canthium coromandelicum is a shrub, usually with opposite horizontal thorns a little above the leaf. Sometimes the shrub is nearly unarmed. Leaves are ovate, smooth, and often fascicled on young shoots. Short, few flowered racemes arise in leaf axils. Flowers are small and yellow with four stamens. Flowers are bearded in the throat. The tube is short, with four to five spreading petals. Anthers are inserted into the throat, scarcely protruding. The style protrudes out and the stigma is somewhat spherical. The fruits are obovate and furrowed on each side, with their color ranging from red to brown, with a dark pink being the prominent color when ripe. The flowering season of the plant is from July to August.

== Image Gallery ==
Canthium coromandelicum - fruits

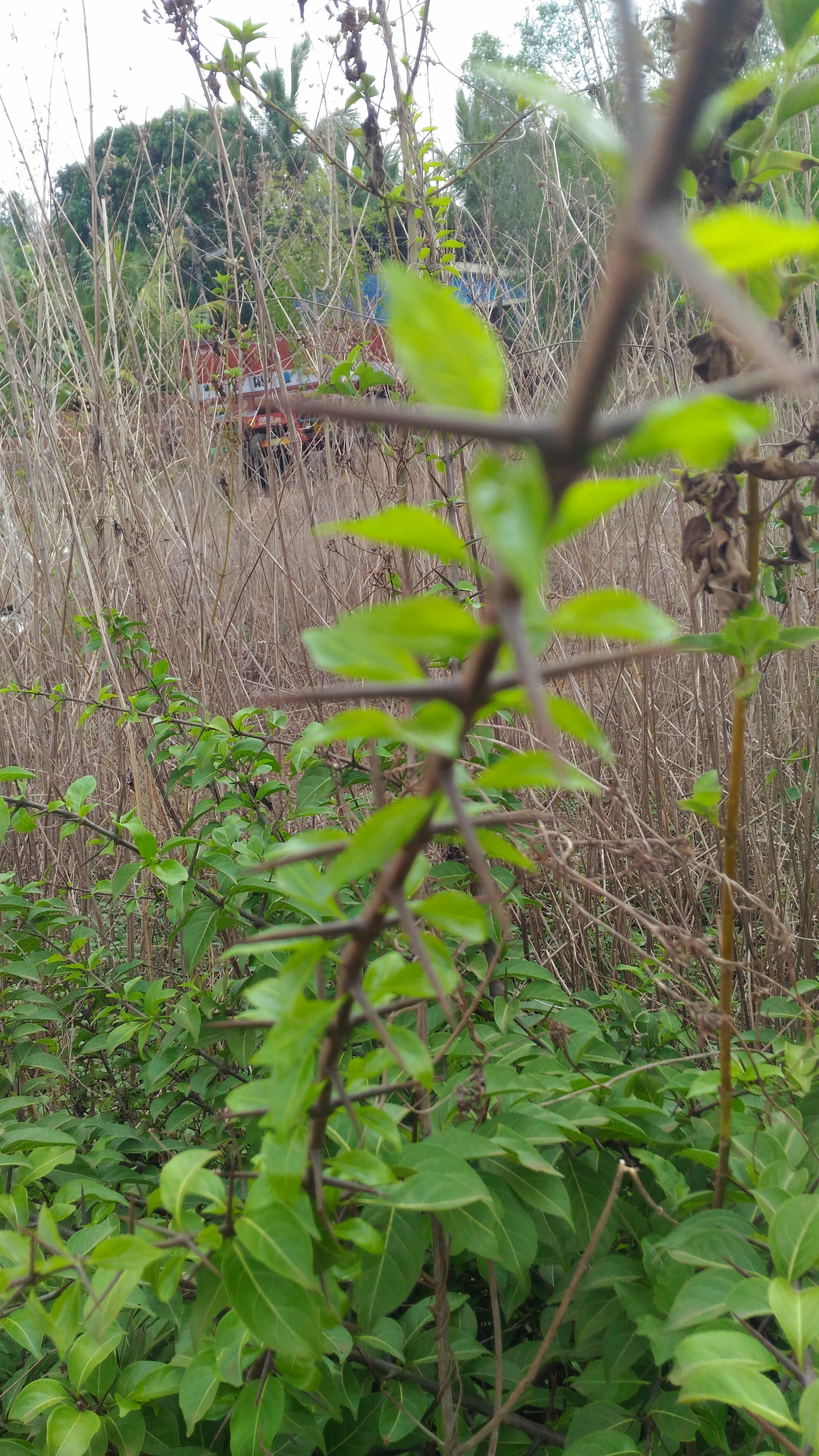
Canthium coromandelicum Thorn

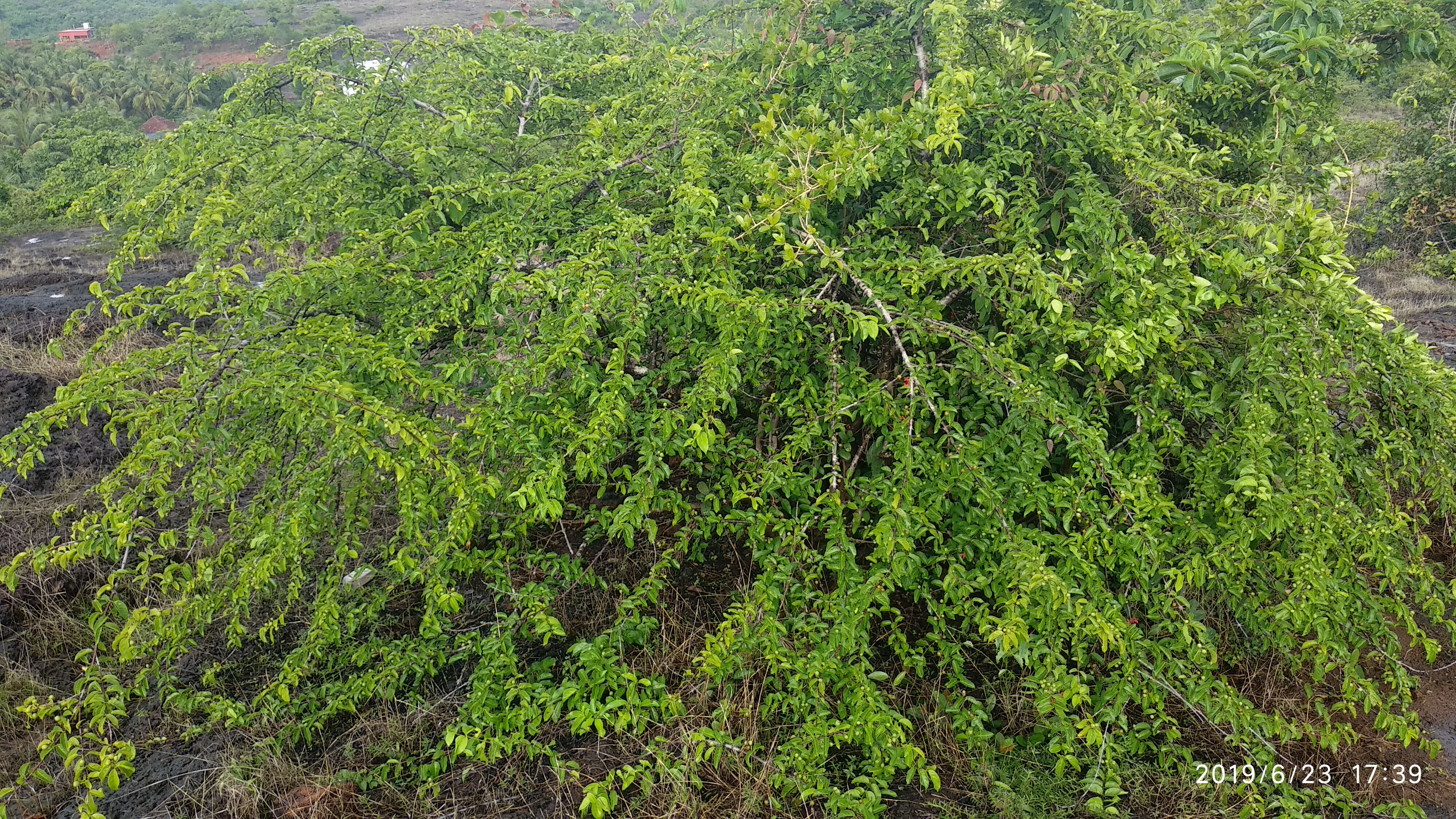
Canthium coromandelicum
