= Afrocanthium siebenlistii =

Conservation status
- Vulnerable (IUCN 2.3)

Scientific classification
- Kingdom: Plantae
- Clade: Tracheophytes
- Clade: Angiosperms
- Clade: Eudicots
- Clade: Asterids
- Order: Gentianales
- Family: Rubiaceae
- Genus: Afrocanthium
- Species: A. siebenlistii

Binomial name
- Afrocanthium siebenlistii (K.Krause) Lantz

Synonyms
- Plectronia siebenlistii K.Krause; Canthium siebenlistii (K.Krause) Bullock

Species of plant

Afrocanthium siebenlistii is a species of flowering plant in the family Rubiaceae. It is endemic to Tanzania, found only in the Usambara and Uzungwa Mountains.
