= John Bridson =

Australian cricketer (1863–1898)

Personal information
- Born: 2 February 1863; Melbourne, Victoria
- Died: 1 February 1898 (aged 34); Belair, South Australia
- Batting: Right-handed

Domestic team information
- Years: Team
- 1883/84: South Australia

Career statistics
Competition	First-class
Matches	1
Runs scored	52
Batting average	26.00
100s/50s	0/1
Top score	52
Catches/stumpings	0/–
- Source: Cricinfo, 18 May 2018

John Bridson (2 February 1863 – 1 February 1898) was an Australian cricketer. He played one first-class match for South Australia during the 1883–84 season.
