= Multidentia =

Scientific classification
- Kingdom: Plantae
- Clade: Tracheophytes
- Clade: Angiosperms
- Clade: Eudicots
- Clade: Asterids
- Order: Gentianales
- Family: Rubiaceae
- Subfamily: Dialypetalanthoideae
- Tribe: Vanguerieae
- Genus: Multidentia; Gilli

Type species
- Multidentia concrescens (Bullock) Bridson & Verdc.

Genus of plants

Multidentia is a genus of flowering plants in the family Rubiaceae.

== Distribution ==
Multidentia is restricted to tropical Africa with the greatest concentration of species occurring in eastern Africa.

== Taxonomy ==
It was originally described by Alexander von Gilli in 1973 to accommodate a single specimen of a suffruticose pyrophyte with ternate leaves. The type species was Multidentia verticillata - named after its verticillate leaves - but has been made synonym with Multidentia concrescens.

== Species ==
- Multidentia castaneae (Robyns) Bridson & Verdc.
- Multidentia concrescens, (Bullock) Bridson & Verdc.
- Multidentia crassa (Hiern) Bridson & Verdc.
- Multidentia dichrophylla (Mildbr.) Bridson
- Multidentia exserta Bridson
- Multidentia fanshawei (Tennant) Bridson
- Multidentia kingupirensis Bridson
- Multidentia pobeguinii (Hutch. & Dalziel) Bridson
- Multidentia saxicola O.Lachenaud & Séné
- Multidentia sclerocarpa (K.Schum.) Bridson
