= Gavin Bridson =

British bibliographer and librarian

Gavin Douglas Ruthven Bridson (12 February 1936 - 10 January 2008) was a British bibliographer and librarian.

== Early life ==
Born Manchester 12 February 1936, together with a twin sister Hermione, their parents were the BBC producer D.G. Bridson, and Vera Richardson, a fabric designer. He was sent to Douai Abbey school. He saw active service with the Royal Hampshire Regiment in Malaya when called up for National Service in 1954. Later he enrolled at North Devon Technical College where he studied for examinations in biology, botany, zoology and geography.

== Career ==
He moved to London as librarian at the Natural History Museum and in 1969 became Librarian of the Linnean Society of London, having been elected a Fellow of the society in 1968.

He moved in 1982 to the Hunt Botanical Institute in Pittsburgh, where he stayed for the rest of his life, as Bibliographer and Principal Research Scholar.

He was known for his study of the history of printmaking. His book American Botanical Prints of Two Centuries, won the Newman Award from the American Historical Print Collectors Society.

== Personal life ==
In 1963 he married Diane Sheppard (b 1942); they had one daughter, Stella Ruth (1972). They later divorced. He then married Marlene Aglinski in 1988. He died in Pittsburgh, Pennsylvania, 10 January 2008.

== Selected publications ==
Carl Linnaeus (1707–1778): a bicentenary guide to the career and achievements of Linnaeus and the collections of the Linnean society. Stearn, William T.; Bridson, Gavin (1978). London: Linnean Society. ISBN 978-0-9506207-0-1.

Printmaking in the Service of Botany. (1986). Donald E. Wendel (Author), Gavin D. R. Bridson (Author). Hunt Institute for Botanical Documentation, Pittsburgh

American Plant, Animal and Anatomical Illustrations in Art and Science: A Bibliographical Guide from the 16th Century to the Present Day. (1990). Gavin D.R. Bridson (Editor), James J. White (Editor). St Paul's Bibliographies

Index to scientific names of organisms cited in the Linnaean dissertations, together with a synoptic bibliography of the dissertations and a concordance for selected editions. (1999). Kiger, Robert W., Tancin, Charlotte A. & Bridson, Gavin D.R. Hunt Institute for Botanical Documentation

Botanical Prints of Two Centuries (2003). Gavin D. R. Bridson (Author), James J. White (Author), Lugene B. Bruno (Author). Hunt Institute for Botanical Documentation, Pittsburgh

The History of Natural History: An annotated bibliography. (2008). Linnean Society of London.
