= Wilhelm Gueinzius =

German naturalist, collector and apothecary

Wilhelm Gueinzius

Wilhelm Gueinzius (15 March 1813 – 24 January 1874) was a German naturalist, collector and apothecary.

== Life ==
Gueinzius was born in Trotha, a suburb of Halle. In his youth he attended the grammar school "Franckesche Stiftung" in Halle, but showed little academic inclination. In 1833 he became an apprentice apothecary, and was employed at the hospital of Charité in Berlin between 1836 and 1837. Working at a pharmacy in Dessau, he made the acquaintance of the police director Brueckner who introduced him to the founder of the zoological museum in Leipzig, Professor Eduard Friedrich Pöppig. Gueinzius was probably trained at Leipzig under Pöppig.

He arrived in the Cape Colony in 1838 and registered as an apothecary. From 1839 to 1840 he collected in the Cape Colony, in particular in the Stellenbosch district and lived in the house of the lay magistrate Theunissen in Somerset West, about 40 km southeast of Cape Town. Around 1840 he moved to the Swellendam area where he worked as a tutor at Morkel's farm Onverwacht in the Hottentots Holland until 1841, when he left for Natal, on an English war frigate commanded by John Marshall, shortly before Natal's annexation by the United Kingdom in 1843. Initially all his specimens were sent to Pöppig, who praised the quality of his collecting in a letter to Joseph Dalton Hooker. Pöppig lodged these specimens under his own name in his herbarium, which has since been moved to Vienna. Pöppig collected extensively in Central and South America, never visiting South Africa.

Gueinzius settled on the Tugela River and supplied the medical needs of the Zulu chief Mpande (Dingaan's half-brother) and his wives. Returning from an expedition to the north, he found that armed conflict had erupted between the English, Boers and Zulus, and that his home had been plundered by British troops. With no reparation forthcoming and destitute, he left Natal to stay with friends in Cape Town. Here he met Charlotte Tayler, the young sister of two English businessmen. Despite being attracted to her, no permanent relationship resulted, largely because of his impoverished state. His relationship with the druggist Juritz in Cape Town, who was to send his collections and letters to Europe, fared no better when it transpired that Juritz had held back letters and had appropriated collection pieces for himself.

Gueinzius returned to Natal in 1844 on the schooner Margaret, after a storm-tossed journey of sixteen days. He stayed at first with a friend, Campion, and found that almost all the Boer families he had known earlier, had left Natal and gone north to escape British dominion. Owing money to Juritz in Cape Town and with his health failing, Gueinzius wrote to Pöppig on 12 December 1848, holding him accountable for a large part of his financial woes in that his reimbursements to Gueinzius were few and paltry. He now turned to the company of W. Schlüter in Halle, to buy his collected items - his ornithological collection ended up at the museum of Leipzig University, insects at the museum in Stettin, and the Ethnology Museum in Dresden gained an ethnographic collection of the Bantu tribes of Natal.

With the independence of Natal as an English crown colony in 1856, Gueinzius acquired a small piece of land. Here he had meetings with other German colonists sent out by Jonas Bergtheil of Bramsche in order to establish a cotton-growing industry in Natal - the "Natal Cotton Company". These colonists had settled in a place they called Neu-Deutschland, today part of the suburb of Westville in Durban. The cotton endeavour soon failed and the Germans turned to growing vegetables to satisfy the growing demands of Durban. Some of the Germans settled in New Hanover outside Pietermaritzburg.

The missionary Karl Wilhelm Posselt (1815-1885) of the Berlin Missionary Society had moved to the mission station Christianenburg, near Neu-Deutschland, in 1858. He wrote "A German naturalist, named Gueinzius ... lives in this forest fissure. He leads an ingenious hermit life, very lonesome in the forest among the birds, and four-footed and crawling animals with which he has an affinity. He collects beetles and butterflies, stuffs birds and also dabbles in the spiritual world". Gueinzius also shared his home with a python. In addition to specimens of flowering plants, he collected marine algae, mosses and ferns, as well as bats, snakes and insects. He often raised butterflies from larvae and eggs. Contemporary writings describe him as striking in appearance with a wide knowledge of the natural world.

He died at Grey's Hospital in Pietermaritzburg, shortly before he was due to return to Germany to live with his brother Karl August Gueinzius in the Province of Saxony.

== Legacy ==
Gueinzius is commemorated in numerous specific names such as Combretum gueinzii Sond., Rhus gueinzii Sond., Psoralea gueinzii Harv., Asplenium gueinzii Mett., Fabronia gueinzii Hampe and Keetia gueinzii (Sond.) Bridson
