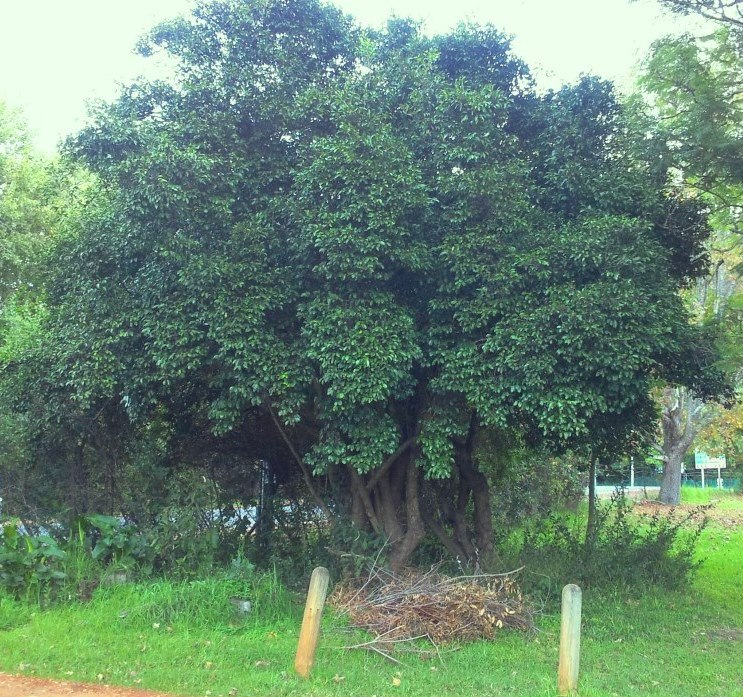
- A small Canthium inerme specimen in Cape Town.

Scientific classification
- Kingdom: Plantae
- Clade: Tracheophytes
- Clade: Angiosperms
- Clade: Eudicots
- Clade: Asterids
- Order: Gentianales
- Family: Rubiaceae
- Genus: Canthium
- Species: C. inerme

Binomial name
- Canthium inerme (L.f.) Kuntze

= Canthium inerme =

Turkey-berry

Species of tree

Canthium inerme (Turkey-berry) is a tough, adaptable medium-sized tree from South Africa. It bears small edible fruits and has a variety of uses in traditional medicine.

== Name ==
The Latin species name of this plant, "inerme", actually means "unarmed", which is an unusual (possibly ironic) name for a tree that does in fact have thorns. Its common name in English refers to how much birds of all kinds enjoy eating the fruits, while the Afrikaans name, "bokdrol", means "buck droppings", and refers to the appearance of the fruits.

== Distribution ==
It has a wide distribution, occurring from Cape Town in the south, along the eastern coast of South Africa as far as Mozambique and inland as far as Zimbabwe, including Natal, Eswatini and Transvaal.

This adaptable tree also occurs in a variety of habitats, ranging from afro-montane forest to coastal grassland and bushveld, and from sea-level up to 1700 m. It is not however found in the most arid environments, nor in the wettest forests, preferring drier scrub forests.

== Appearance ==
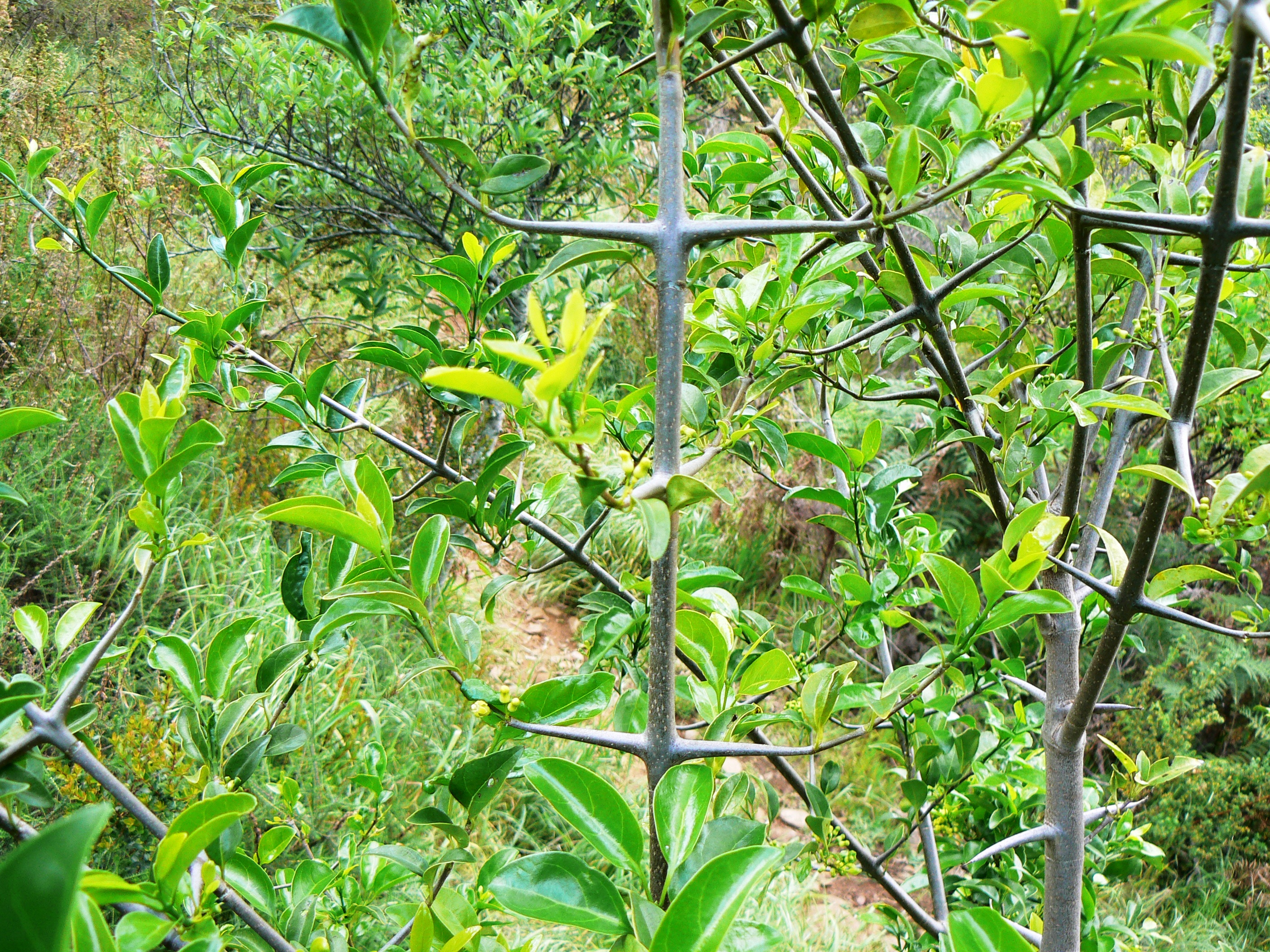
Turkeyberry thorns, growing at their distinctively symmetrical right angles. They often then sprout leaves and become new branches.

This is a very variable species, but it generally grows as a small to medium-sized tree. Like many trees, in shady conditions it grows tall and sparse up to 14m in height, while in direct sunlight it forms a small, dense, domed tree of about 5m.

A very distinctive feature of this species is the way it grows its thorns in opposite pairs, at perfect right angles on the branch. These thorns often become branches in their own right, similarly at striking right angles - both to the parent branch, and to the neighboring pairs of branches. The leaves, also borne in opposite pairs, are small, light green and glossy, while the flowers appear in Spring as dense creamy-yellow clusters. Each tree produces both male and female flowers, but they are functionally uni-sexual.

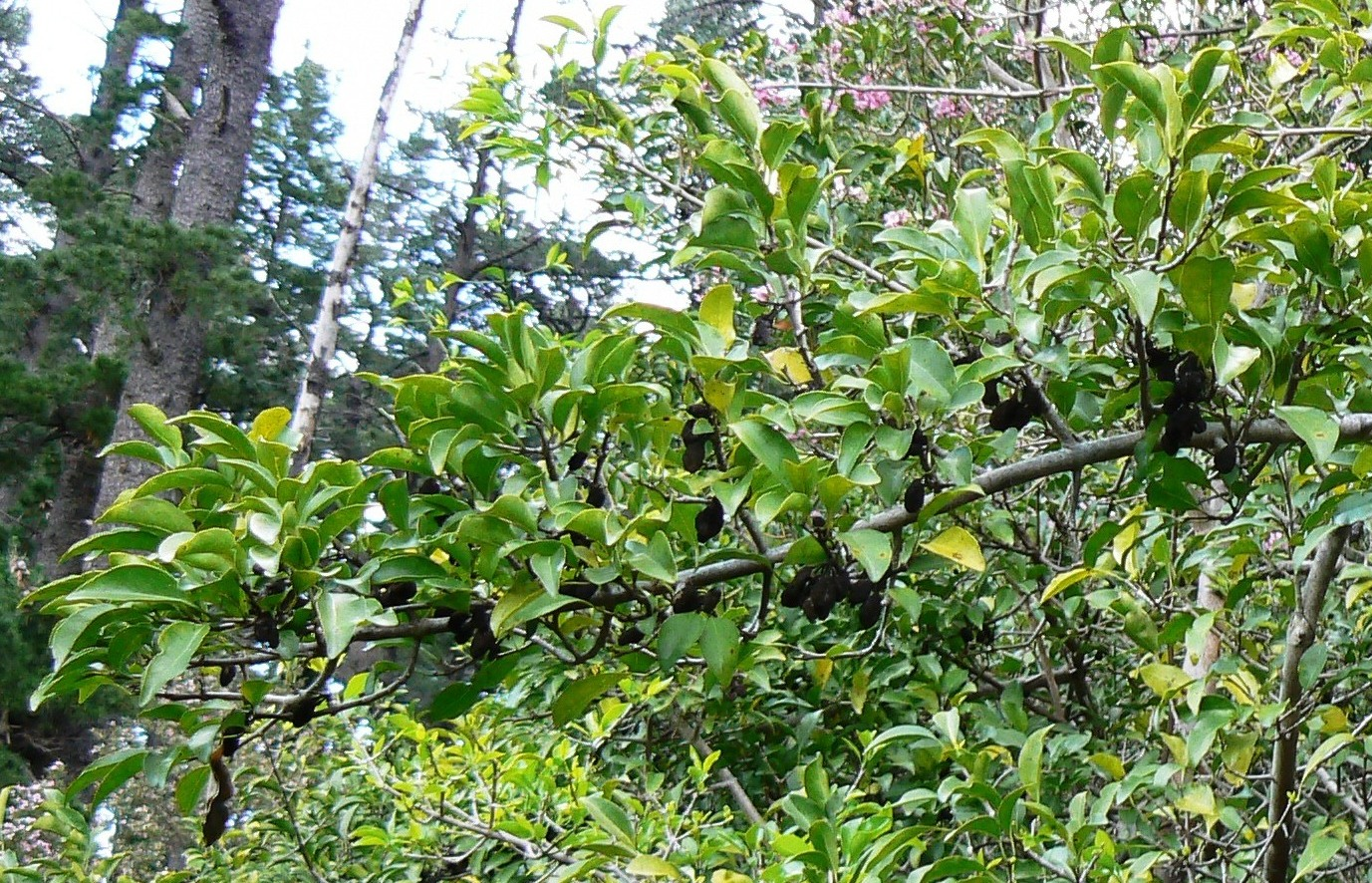
The typical fruits of the Turkey-berry, which blacken and stay on the tree for many months

Another distinctive characteristic of this tree is the small, tough fruits which appear soon after flowering and stay on the tree for much of the year. They are initially smooth and green, but they soon become black and dry, and remain firmly attached in small bunches to the tree. They are relished by birds which are consequently greatly attracted by this tree, however they are also edible for humans.

Its one or more trunks can become twisted and knotted in larger specimens, and are generally a smooth, pale grey.

== Uses ==
In a garden, this hardy evergreen tree attracts birds, while also serving as a possible security hedge. To assure a typical tree shape, prune off the lower branches. It is known to grow very easily from seed.

The foliage and typically twisted trunk of a fully grown tree:

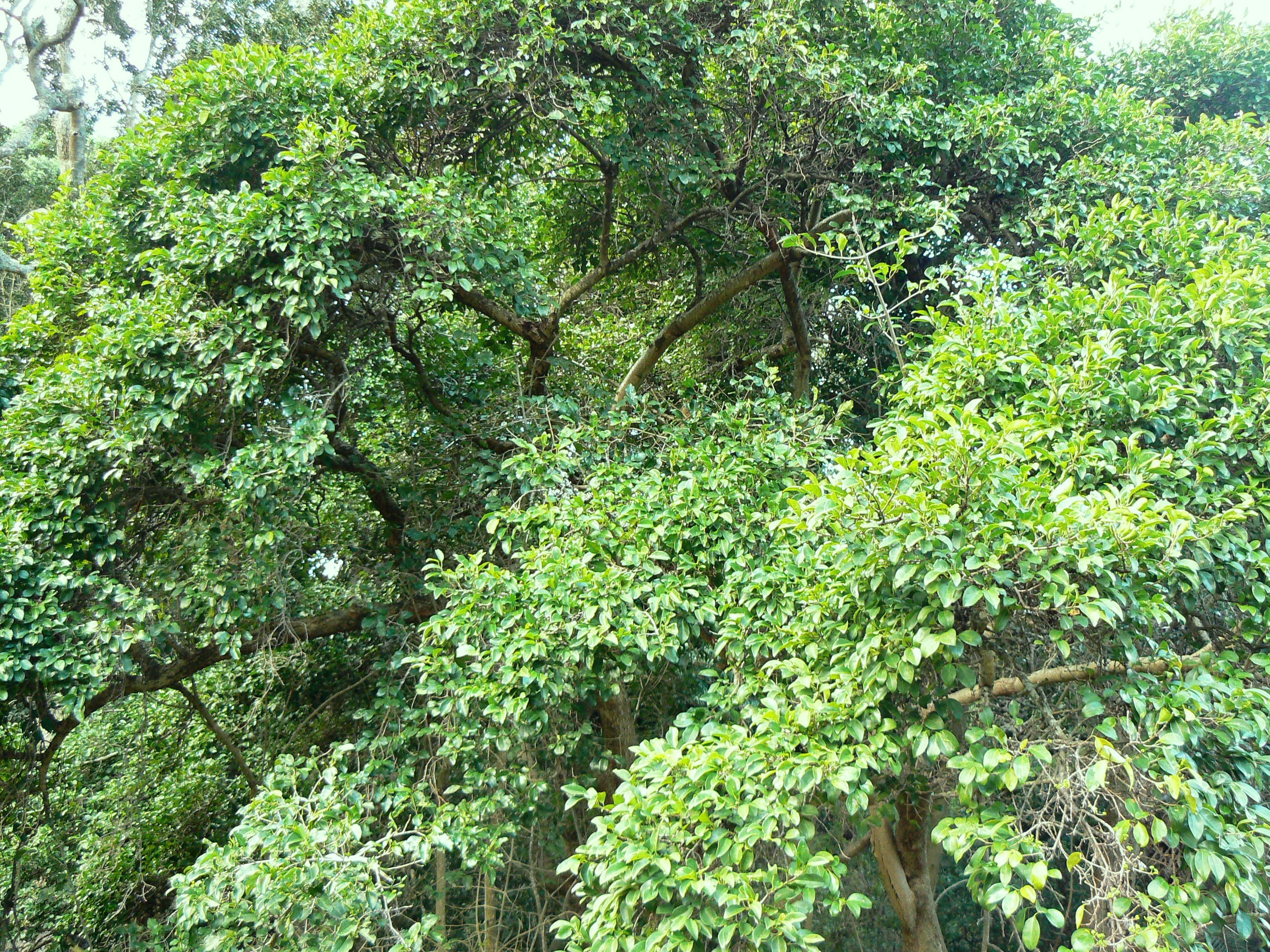

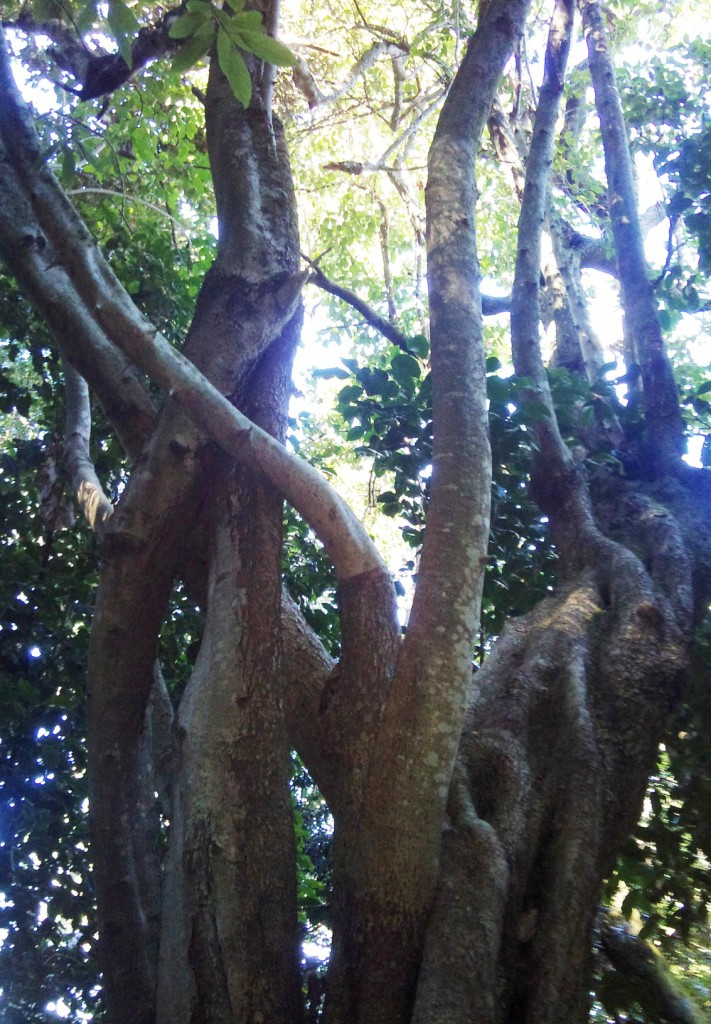
