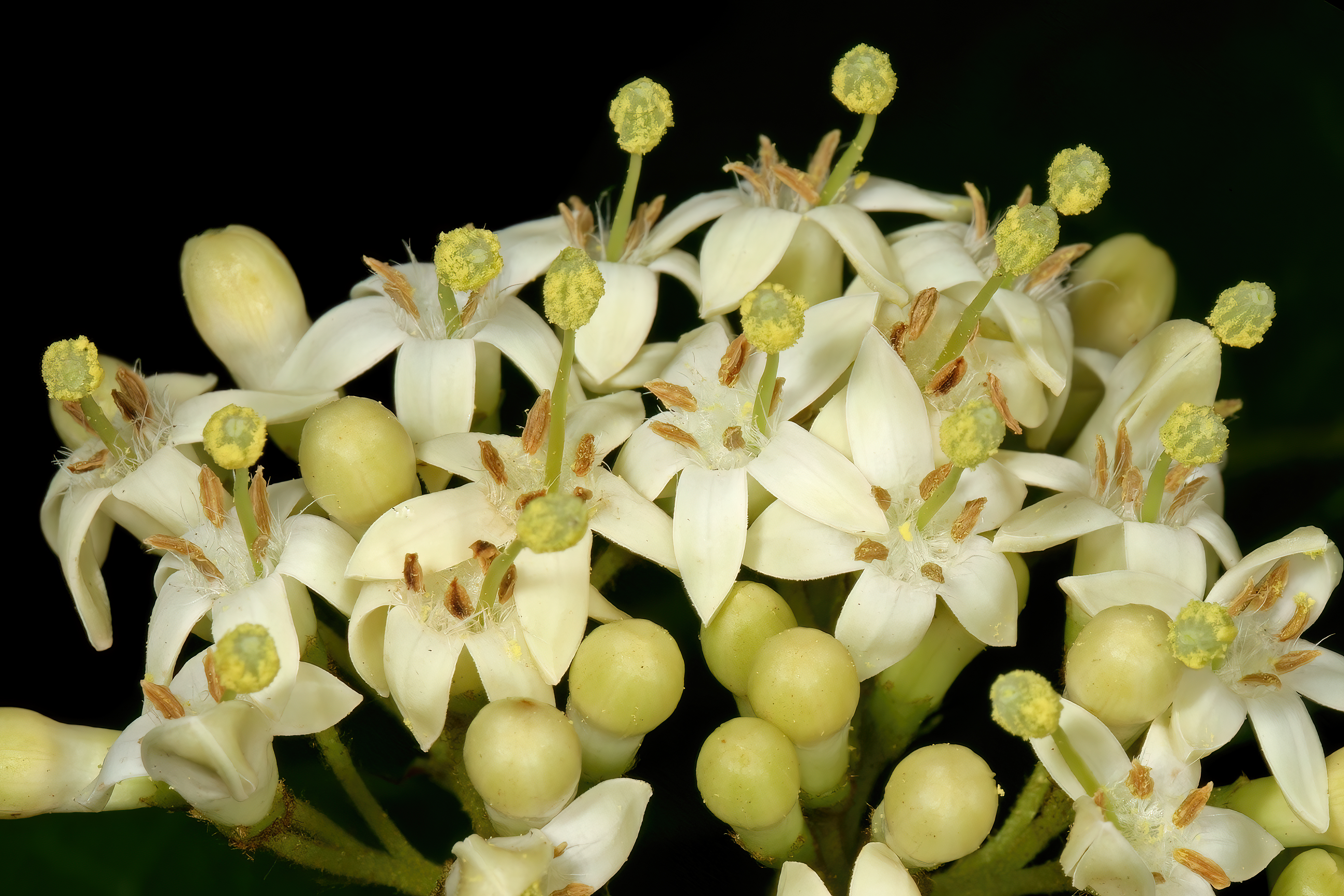
- Keetia gueinzii

Scientific classification
- Kingdom: Plantae
- Clade: Embryophytes
- Clade: Tracheophytes
- Clade: Angiosperms
- Clade: Eudicots
- Clade: Asterids
- Order: Gentianales
- Family: Rubiaceae
- Subfamily: Dialypetalanthoideae
- Tribe: Vanguerieae
- Genus: Keetia; E.Phillips

Type species
- Keetia gueinzii (Sond.) Bridson

= Keetia =

Genus of shrubs

Keetia is a genus of flowering plants in the family Rubiaceae. It consists of climbers or scrambling shrubs, rarely small trees.

== Distribution ==
The genus has a wide distribution area and occurs in tropical and southern Africa.

== Taxonomy ==
It was originally described by Edwin Percy Phillips in 1926 and is named after J.D.M Keet, a South African forester and plant collector. The type species was Keetia transvaalensis, which received its name from the region it was first collected, but is now included in Keetia gueinzii.

== Species ==
- Keetia abouabou Cheek
- Keetia acuminata Bridson
- Keetia angustifolia Bridson
- Keetia bakossiorum Cheek
- Keetia bridsoniae Jongkind
- Keetia carmichaelii Bridson
- Keetia cornelia (Cham. & Schltdl.) Bridson
- Keetia ferruginea Bridson
- Keetia foetida Bridson
- Keetia futa Cheek
- Keetia gracilis Bridson
- Keetia gueinzii (Sond.) Bridson
- Keetia hispida (Benth.)Bridson
- Keetia inaequilatera (Hutch. & Dalziel) Bridson
- Keetia koritschoneri Bridson
- Keetia leucantha (K.Krause) Bridson
- Keetia lukei Bridson
- Keetia lulandensis Bridson
- Keetia mannii (Hiern) Bridson
- Keetia molundensis (K.Krause) Bridson
- Keetia multiflora (Schumach. & Thonn.) Bridson
- Keetia namoyae O.Lachenaud & Q.Luke
- Keetia obovata Jongkind
- Keetia ornata Bridson
- Keetia procteri Bridson
- Keetia purpurascens (Bullock) Bridson
- Keetia purseglovei Bridson
- Keetia ripae (De Wild.) Bridson
- Keetia rubens (Hiern) Bridson
- Keetia rufivillosa (Robyns ex Hutch. & Dalziel) Bridson
- Keetia rwandensis Bridson
- Keetia susu Cheek
- Keetia tenuiflora (Welw. ex Hiern) Bridson
- Keetia venosa (Oliv.) Bridson
- Keetia venosissima (Hutch. & Dalziel) Bridson
- Keetia zanzibarica (Klotzsch) Bridson
