= Diane Mary Bridson =

British botanist (born 1942)

- Born: 1942 (age 83–84)
- Scientific career
- Fields: Botany
- Author abbrev. (botany): Bridson

Diane Mary Bridson (born 1942) is a British botanist.

== Biography ==
Bridson entered the Herbarium at Kew Gardens in 1963 starting as an assistant in the African section, working on Rubiaceae, eventually becoming a Principal Scientific Officer. She was Assistant Keeper for a couple of years and retired in 2002. She was senior tutor on Kew's 'International Diploma Course in Herbarium Techniques' and was co-editor of The Herbarium handbook, first published in 1989. She has published extensively on Rubiaceae, with a particular focus on Coffea, including the account for Flora of Tropical East Africa.

Bridson has lived in Ham, Richmond for over 50 years and is active in the Friends of Ham Lands group, where she leads Nature Safaris.

Born Diane Sheppard she married Gavin Bridson (1936-2008) in 1963.

== Eponyms ==
The genera Bridsonia Verstraete & A.E.van Wyk and Dibridsonia K.M.Wong are named after her, as well as the species Coffea bridsoniae A.P.Davis & Mvungi, Keetia bridsoniae Jongkind, Pavetta bridsoniae P.I.Forst., Psilanthus bridsoniae Sivar., Biju & P.Mathew, Psychotria bridsoniae A.P.Davis & Govaerts, and Rytigynia bridsoniae Verdc., and one subspecies Pyrostria lobulata subsp. bridsoniae Matheka & I.Darbysh..

== Selected publications ==
- Flora of tropical East Africa. Bixaceae (1975). Bridson, Diane Mary; Polhill, Roger Marcus. Royal Botanic Gardens, Kew
- Flore des plantes ligneuses du Rwanda. (1982). G. Troupin, Diane M. Bridson. Musée Royal de l'Afrique Centrale
- Studies in Coffea and Psilanthus for part 2 of ‘Flora of Tropical East Africa’: Rubiaceae. Bridson, D.M. (1982). Kew Bull. 36: 817–860.
- Flora of Egypt. Family 80. l, Vahliaceae. (1983). Bridson, Diane Mary
- Flora of tropical East Africa. Rubiaceae. Part 2. (1988). Bridson, Diane Mary; Verdcourt, Bernard; Polhill, Roger Marcus. Royal Botanic Gardens, Kew. ISBN 9789061913375
- The Herbarium handbook. (1989). Diane M Bridson, Leonard Forman. Royal Botanic Gardens, Kew.
- Flora of tropical East Africa. Rubiaceae. Part 3. (1991). Verdcourt, Bernard; Bridson, Diane Mary; Polhill, Roger Marcus. Royal Botanic Gardens, Kew. (ISBN 9789061913573)
- Rubiaceae, pt 2. Flora Zambesiaca, 5(2). Bridson, D.M. & Verdcourt, B. (1998). Kew: Royal Botanic Gardens, Kew. 211–377.
- Flora Zambesiaca, 5(3): 379–720. Bridson, D.M. & Verdcourt, B. (2004). Kew: Royal Botanic Gardens, Kew.
