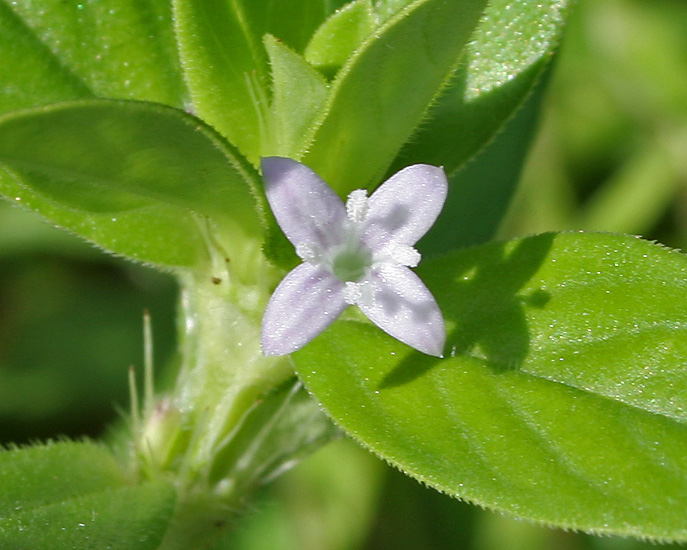
- Spermacoce articularis

Scientific classification
- Kingdom: Plantae
- Clade: Tracheophytes
- Clade: Angiosperms
- Clade: Eudicots
- Clade: Asterids
- Order: Gentianales
- Family: Rubiaceae
- Subfamily: Rubioideae
- Tribe: Spermacoceae; Cham. & Schltdl. ex DC.

Type genus
- Spermacoce L.

= Spermacoceae =

Tribe of flowering plants

Spermacoceae is a tribe of flowering plants in the family Rubiaceae and contains about 1346 species in 57 genera. Its representatives are found in the tropics and subtropics.

== Genera ==
Currently accepted names

- Agathisanthemum Klotzsch (5 sp.)
- Amphiasma Bremek. (7 sp.)
- Amphistemon Groeninckx (2 sp.)
- Anthospermopsis (K.Schum.) J.H.Kirkbr. (1 sp.)
- Arcytophyllum Willd. (18 sp.)
- Astiella Jovet (1 sp.)
- Bouvardia Salisb. (51 sp.)
- Carajasia R.M.Salas, E.L.Cabral & Dessein (1 sp.)
- Carterella Terrell (1 sp.)
- Conostomium (Stapf) Cufod. (5 sp.)
- Cordylostigma Groeninckx (9 sp.)
- Crusea Schltdl. & Cham. (15 sp.)
- Debia Neupane & N.Wikstr. (4 sp.)
- Dentella J.R.Frost. & G.Frost. (8 sp.)
- Dibrachionostylus Bremek. (1 sp.)
- Dimetia (Wight & Arn.) Meisn. (6 sp.)
- Diodella Small (12 sp.)
- Diodia L. (23 sp.)
- Edrastima Raf. (5 sp.)
- Emmeorhiza Pohl ex Endl. (1 sp.)
- Ernodea Sw. (8 sp.)
- Exallage Bremek. (18 sp.)
- Galianthe Griseb. (48 sp.)
- Gomphocalyx Baker (1 sp.)
- Hedyotis L. (182 sp.)
- Hedythyrsus Bremek. (3 sp.)
- Houstonia L. (24 sp.)
- Hydrophylax L.f. (1 sp.)
- Involucrella (Benth. & Hook.f.) Neupane (2 sp.)
- Kadua Cham. & Schltdl. (30 sp.)
- Kohautia Cham. & Schltdl. (28 sp.)
- Lathraeocarpa Bremek. (2 sp.)
- Lelya Bremek. (1 sp.)
- Leptopetalum Hook. & Arn. (8 sp.)
- Manettia Mutis ex L. (125 sp.)
- Manostachya Bremek. (3 sp.)
- Mitracarpus Zucc. (65 sp.)
- Mitrasacmopsis Jovet (1 sp.)
- Neanotis W.H.Lewis (34 sp.)
- Nesohedyotis (Hook.f.) Bremek. (1 sp.)
- Oldenlandia L. (217 sp.)
- Oldenlandiopsis Terrell & W.H.Lewis (1 sp.)
- Pentanopsis Rendle (2 sp.)
- Pentodon Hochst. (2 sp.)
- Phylohydrax Puff (2 sp.)
- Planaltina R.M.Salas & E.L.Cabral (3 sp.)
- Psyllocarpus Mart. & Zucc. (9 sp.)
- Richardia L. (16 sp.)
- Sacosperma G.Taylor (2 sp.)
- Schwendenera K.Schum. (1 sp.)
- Spermacoce L. (286 sp.)
- Staelia Cham. & Schltdl. (21 sp.)
- Stenaria (Raf.) Terrell (6 sp.)
- Stephanococcus Bremek. (1 sp.)
- Synaptantha Hook.f. (2 sp.)
- Tessiera DC. (2 sp.)
- Thamnoldenlandia Groeninckx (1 sp.)

Synonyms

- Adenothola Lem. = Manettia
- Aeginetia Cav. = Bouvardia
- Allaeophania Thwaites = Hedyotis
- Anistelma Raf. = Hedyotis
- Anotis DC. = Arcytophyllum
- Arbulocarpus Tennant = Spermacoce
- Bigelovia Spreng. = Spermacoce
- Bigelowia DC. = Spermacoce
- Borreria G.Mey. = Spermacoce
- Chaenocarpus Neck. ex A.Juss. = Spermacoce
- Chamisme Nieuwl. = Houstonia
- Chenocarpus Neck. = Spermacoce
- Conotrichia A.Rich. = Manettia
- Cormylus Raf. = Oldenlandia
- Covolia Neck. = Spermacoce
- Dasycephala (DC.) Hook.f. = Spermacoce
- Decapenta Raf. = Diodia
- Dichrospermum Bremek. = Spermacoce
- Diodioides Loefl. = Spermacoce
- Dioneiodon Raf. = Diodia
- Diphragmus C.Pres. = Tessiera
- Diplophragma (Wight & Arn.) Meisn. = Hedyotis
- Duvaucellia Bowdich = Kohautia
- Dyctiospora Reinw. ex Korth. = Oldenlandia
- Ebelia Rchb. = Diodia
- Edrastenia Raf. = Edrastima
- Eionitis Bremek. = Oldenlandia
- Endlichera C.Presl = Emmeorhiza
- Endolasia Turcz. = Manettia
- Endopogon Raf. = Diodella
- Ereicoctis (DC.) Kuntze = Arcytophyllum
- Gerontogea Cham. & Schltdl. = Oldenlandia
- Gonotheca Blume ex DC. = Leptopetalum
- Gouldia A.Gray = Kadua
- Gruhlmania Neck. = Spermacoce
- Guagnebina Vell. = Manettia
- Hemidiodia K.Schum. = Spermacoce
- Heymia Dennst. = Dentella
- Hypodematium A.Rich. = Spermacoce
- Jurgensia Raf. = Spermacoce
- Karamyschewia Fisch. & C.A.Mey. = Oldenlandia
- Lippaya Endl. = Dentella
- Listeria Neck. = Oldenlandia
- Lygistum P.Browne = Manettia
- Macrandria (Wight & Arn.) Meisn. = Hedyotis
- Mallostoma H.Karst. = Arcytophyllum
- Metabolos Blume = Hedyotis
- Metabolus A.Rich. = Hedyotis
- Mitratheca K.Schum. = Oldenlandia
- Nacibea Aubl. = Manettia
- Neosabicea Wernham = Manettia
- Octodon Thonn. = Spermacoce
- Panetos Raf. = Houstonia
- Paragophyton K.Schum. = Spermacoce
- Peltospermum Benth. = Sacosperma
- Pleiocraterium Bremek. = Hedyotis
- Plethyrsis Raf. = Richardia
- Poederiopsis Rusby = Manettia
- Poiretia J.F.Gmel. = Houstonia
- Pseudrachicallis H.Karst. = Arcytophyllum
- Pterostephus C.Pres. = Spermacoce
- Richardsonia Kunth = Richardia
- Sarissus Gaertn. = Hydrophylax
- Schiedea Bartl. = Richardia
- Schizangium Bartl. ex DC. = Mitracarpus
- Sclerococcus Bartl. = Hedyotis
- Scleromitrion (Wight & Arn.) Meisn. = Hedyotis
- Spermacoceodes Kuntze = Spermacoce
- Staurospermum Thonn. = Mitracarpus
- Stelmanis Raf. = Oldenlandia
- Stelmotis Raf. = Oldenlandia
- Symphyllarion Gagnep. = Hedyotis
- Tardavel Adans. = Spermacoce
- Teinosolen Hook.f. = Arcytophyllum
- Terrellianthus Borhidi = Arcytophyllum
- Thecagonum Babu = Leptopetalum
- Thecorchus Bremek. = Oldenlandia
- Theyodis A.Rich. = Oldenlandia
- Triodon DC. = Diodia
- Vanessa Raf. = Manettia
- Wiegmannnia Meyen = Kadua
