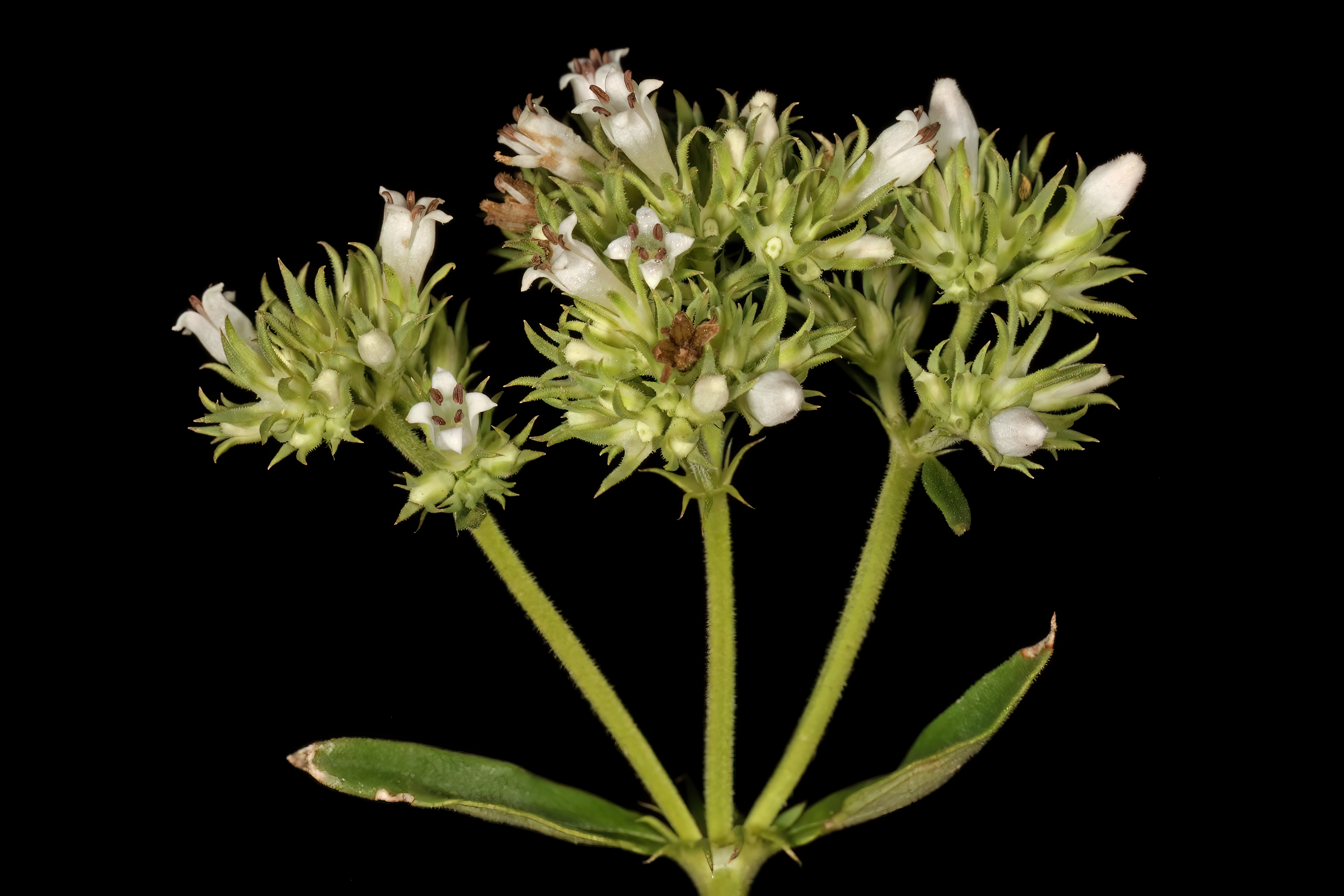
- Agathisanthemum bojeri

Scientific classification
- Kingdom: Plantae
- Clade: Tracheophytes
- Clade: Angiosperms
- Clade: Eudicots
- Clade: Asterids
- Order: Gentianales
- Family: Rubiaceae
- Subfamily: Rubioideae
- Tribe: Spermacoceae
- Genus: Agathisanthemum; Klotzsch (1861)

= Agathisanthemum =

Genus of plants

Agathisanthemum is a genus of flowering plants in the family Rubiaceae. It was described by Johann Friedrich Klotzsch in 1861. It is found in tropical and southern Africa, on the Comoros and in Madagascar.

== Species ==
- Agathisanthemum assimile Bremek. – Tanzania
- Agathisanthemum bojeri Klotzsch – from Somalia to Eswatini plus Madagascar and Comoros
  - subsp. angolense (Bremek.) Verdc. – Angola, Zambia
  - subsp. bojeri – most of species range
  - var. linearifolia Verdc. – Angola, Zambia
- Agathisanthemum chlorophyllum (Hochst.) Bremek. – Natal
- Agathisanthemum globosum (Hochst. ex A.Rich.) Klotzsch – from Gabon and Ethiopia south to Zimbabwe and Mozambique
