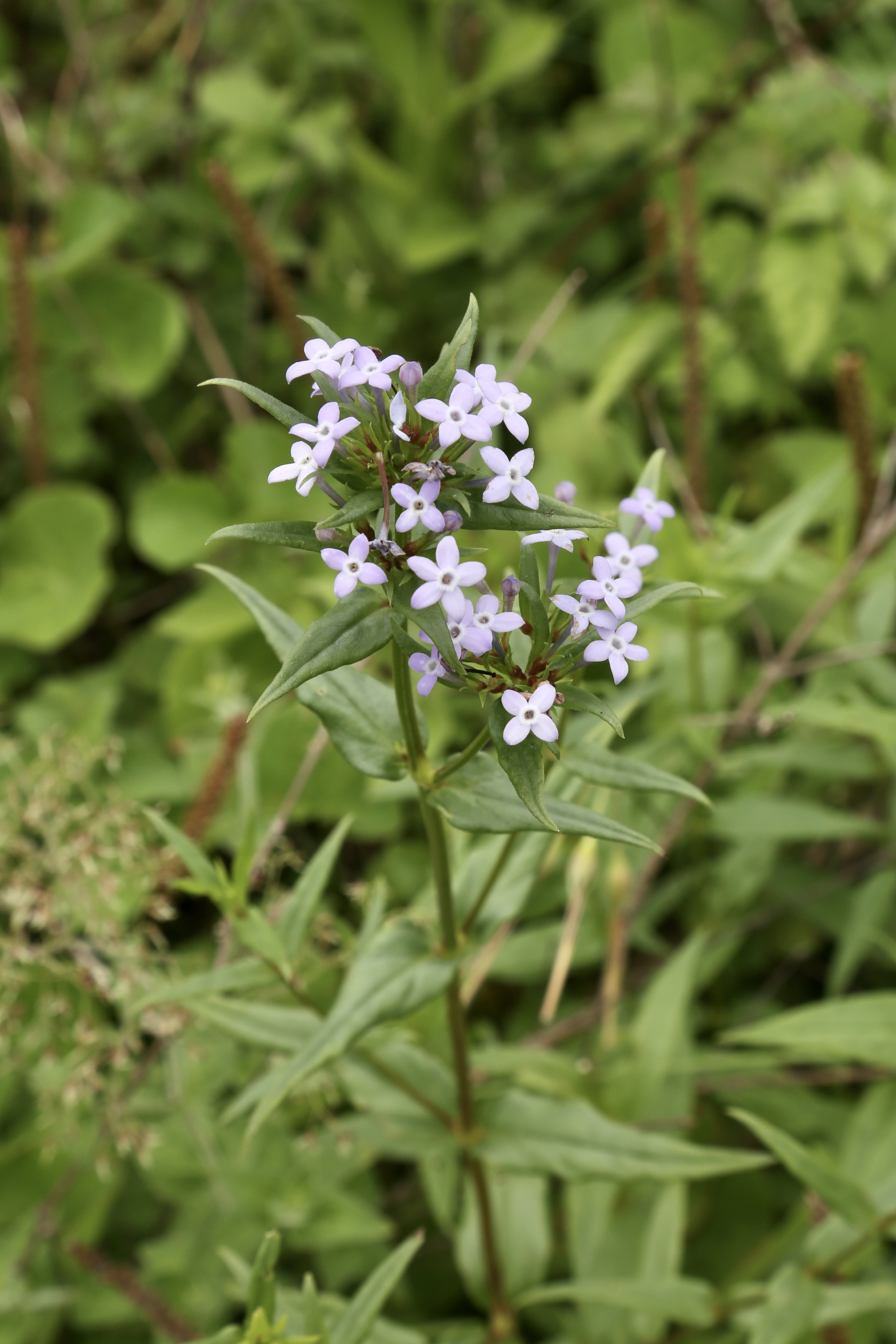
- Conostomium natalense from Vernon Crookes Nature Reserve, KwaZulu-Natal.

Scientific classification
- Kingdom: Plantae
- Clade: Tracheophytes
- Clade: Angiosperms
- Clade: Eudicots
- Clade: Asterids
- Order: Gentianales
- Family: Rubiaceae
- Subfamily: Rubioideae
- Tribe: Spermacoceae
- Genus: Conostomium (Stapf) Cufod. (1948)

= Conostomium =

Genus of plants

Conostomium is a genus of flowering plants in the family Rubiaceae. The genus is found from Ethiopia to South Africa.

== Species ==
- Conostomium gazense Verdc. — Mozambique
- Conostomium longitubum (Beck) Cufod. — Djibouti, Ethiopia, Somalia, Kenya
- Conostomium natalense (Hochst.) Bremek. — Mozambique, Zimbabwe, South Africa
- Conostomium quadrangulare (Rendle) Cufod. — Ethiopia, Sudan, Kenya, Uganda
- Conostomium zoutpansbergense (Bremek.) Bremek. — Mozambique, Transvaal
