= Phylohydrax =

Scientific classification
- Kingdom: Plantae
- Clade: Tracheophytes
- Clade: Angiosperms
- Clade: Eudicots
- Clade: Asterids
- Order: Gentianales
- Family: Rubiaceae
- Subfamily: Rubioideae
- Tribe: Spermacoceae
- Genus: Phylohydrax; Puff

Type species
- Phylohydrax carnosa (Hochst.) Puff

Genus of plants

Phylohydrax is a genus of plants in the family Rubiaceae. Its species are native to Madagascar, Tanzania and South Africa.

== Taxonomy ==
The genus Phylohydrax was established by Christian Puff in 1986 to accommodate two species previously placed in the genus Hydrophylax. The two genera were distinguished on morphological grounds, in particular the detailed structure of the flowers. Phylohydrax species are heterostylous unlike those of Hydrophylax. Puff placed the genus in the tribe Spermacoceae, a placement supported by more recent sources.

=== Species ===
As of March 2023, Plants of the World Online accepted two species:

- Phylohydrax carnosa (Hochst.) Puff – Madagascar, South Africa
- Phylohydrax madagascariensis (Willd. ex Roem. & Schult.) Puff – Tanzania, Madagascar
