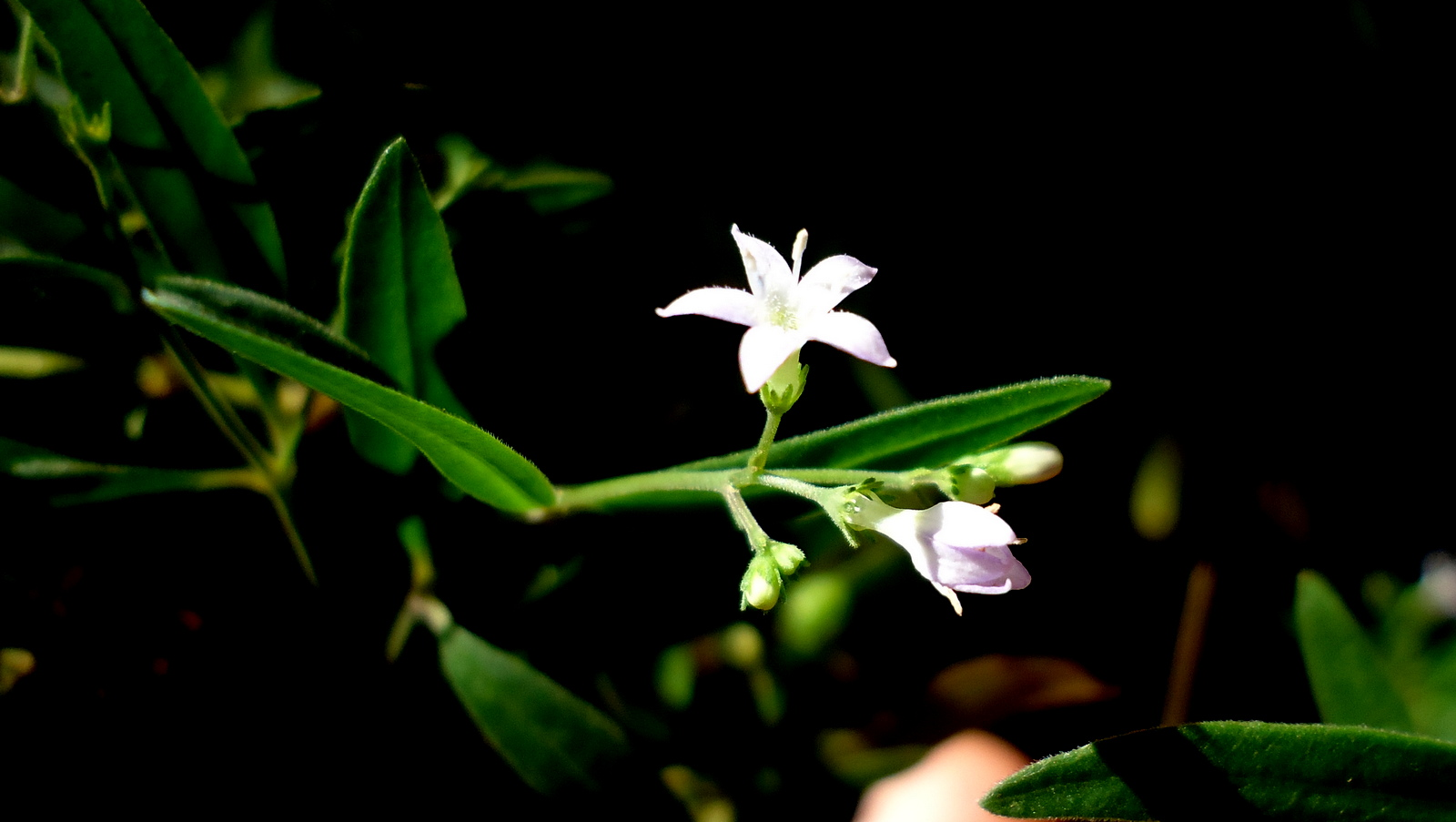
- Pentodon pentandrus

Scientific classification
- Kingdom: Plantae
- Clade: Tracheophytes
- Clade: Angiosperms
- Clade: Eudicots
- Clade: Asterids
- Order: Gentianales
- Family: Rubiaceae
- Tribe: Spermacoceae
- Genus: Pentodon; Hochst.

= Pentodon (plant) =

Genus of plants

Pentodon is a genus of plants belonging to the family Rubiaceae. There appear to be only two species in the genus. They are found in Central America, Central and Southern Africa and the Seychelles.
