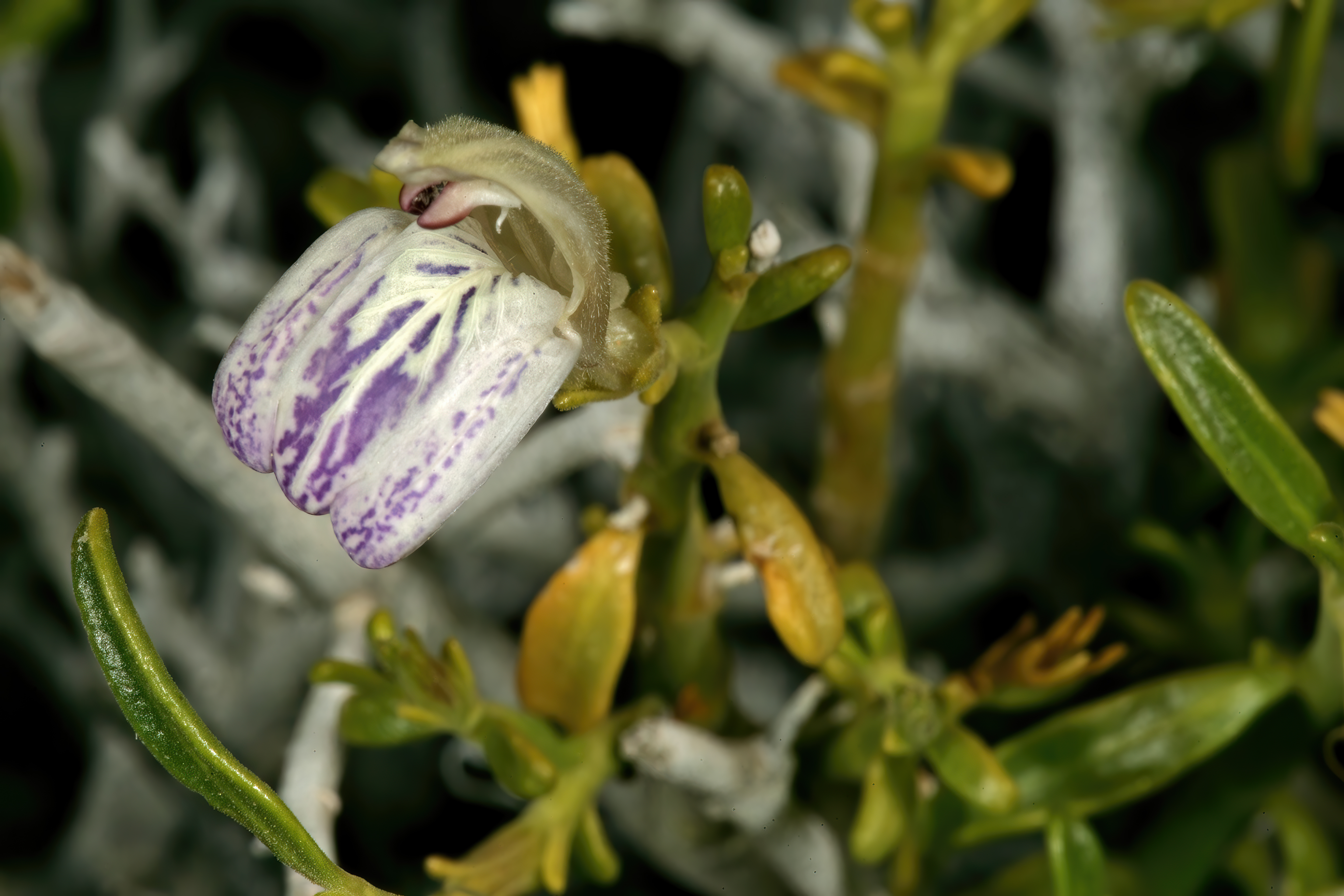
- Image of Pogonospermum patulum

Scientific classification
- Kingdom: Plantae
- Clade: Tracheophytes
- Clade: Angiosperms
- Clade: Eudicots
- Clade: Asterids
- Order: Lamiales
- Family: Acanthaceae
- Genus: Pogonospermum; Hochst. (1844)

Species
- 34; see text

= Pogonospermum =

Genus of flowering plants

Pogonospermum is a genus of flowering plants in the family Acanthaceae.

It includes 34 species native to sub-Saharan Africa.

- Pogonospermum attenuifolium (Vollesen) I.Darbysh. & Kiel
- Pogonospermum australe (P.G.Mey.) I.Darbysh. & Kiel
- Pogonospermum calcaratum (Schinz) I.Darbysh. & Kiel
- Pogonospermum callothamnum (Munday) I.Darbysh. & Kiel
- Pogonospermum ciliatum (Jacq.) I.Darbysh. & Kiel
- Pogonospermum cleomoides (S.Moore) I.Darbysh. & Kiel
- Pogonospermum crassiusculum (P.G.Mey.) I.Darbysh. & Kiel
- Pogonospermum cubangense (I.Darbysh. & Goyder) I.Darbysh. & Kiel
- Pogonospermum depauperatum (T.Anderson) I.Darbysh. & Kiel
- Pogonospermum desertorum (Engl.) I.Darbysh. & Kiel
- Pogonospermum distichotrichum (Lindau) I.Darbysh. & Kiel
- Pogonospermum divaricatum (Licht. ex Roem. & Schult.) I.Darbysh. & Kiel
- Pogonospermum eriniae (I.Darbysh.) I.Darbysh. & Kiel
- Pogonospermum fanshawei (Vollesen) I.Darbysh. & Kiel
- Pogonospermum genistifolium (Engl.) I.Darbysh. & Kiel
- Pogonospermum glaucifolium (S.Moore) I.Darbysh. & Kiel
- Pogonospermum grandiflorum (Schinz) I.Darbysh. & Kiel
- Pogonospermum incanum (Nees) I.Darbysh. & Kiel
- Pogonospermum kasamae (Vollesen) I.Darbysh. & Kiel
- Pogonospermum laetum (S.Moore) I.Darbysh. & Kiel
- Pogonospermum leucoderme (Schinz) I.Darbysh. & Kiel
- Pogonospermum lolioides (S.Moore) I.Darbysh. & Kiel
- Pogonospermum mollissimum (Nees) I.Darbysh. & Kiel
- Pogonospermum ndellense (Lindau) I.Darbysh. & Kiel
- Pogonospermum patulum (Licht. ex Roem. & Schult.) I.Darbysh. & Kiel
- Pogonospermum rigidum (S.Moore) I.Darbysh. & Kiel
- Pogonospermum robustum (Bond) I.Darbysh. & Kiel
- Pogonospermum salsola (S.Moore) I.Darbysh. & Kiel
- Pogonospermum saxatile (Munday) I.Darbysh. & Kiel
- Pogonospermum scabridum (S.Moore) I.Darbysh. & Kiel
- Pogonospermum serotinum (P.G.Mey.) I.Darbysh. & Kiel
- Pogonospermum subsessile (Oliv.) I.Darbysh. & Kiel
- Pogonospermum tricostatum (Vollesen) I.Darbysh. & Kiel
- Pogonospermum virgultorum (S.Moore) I.Darbysh. & Kiel
