= Dibrachionostylus =

Scientific classification
- Kingdom: Plantae
- Clade: Tracheophytes
- Clade: Angiosperms
- Clade: Eudicots
- Clade: Asterids
- Order: Gentianales
- Family: Rubiaceae
- Subfamily: Rubioideae
- Tribe: Spermacoceae
- Genus: Dibrachionostylus; Bremek.
- Species: D. kaessneri

Binomial name
- Dibrachionostylus kaessneri (S.Moore) Bremek.

Synonyms
- Oldenlandia kaessneri S.Moore

Genus of plants

Dibrachionostylus is a monotypic genus of flowering plants in the family Rubiaceae. The genus contains only one species, viz. Dibrachionostylus kaessneri, which is endemic to Kenya.
