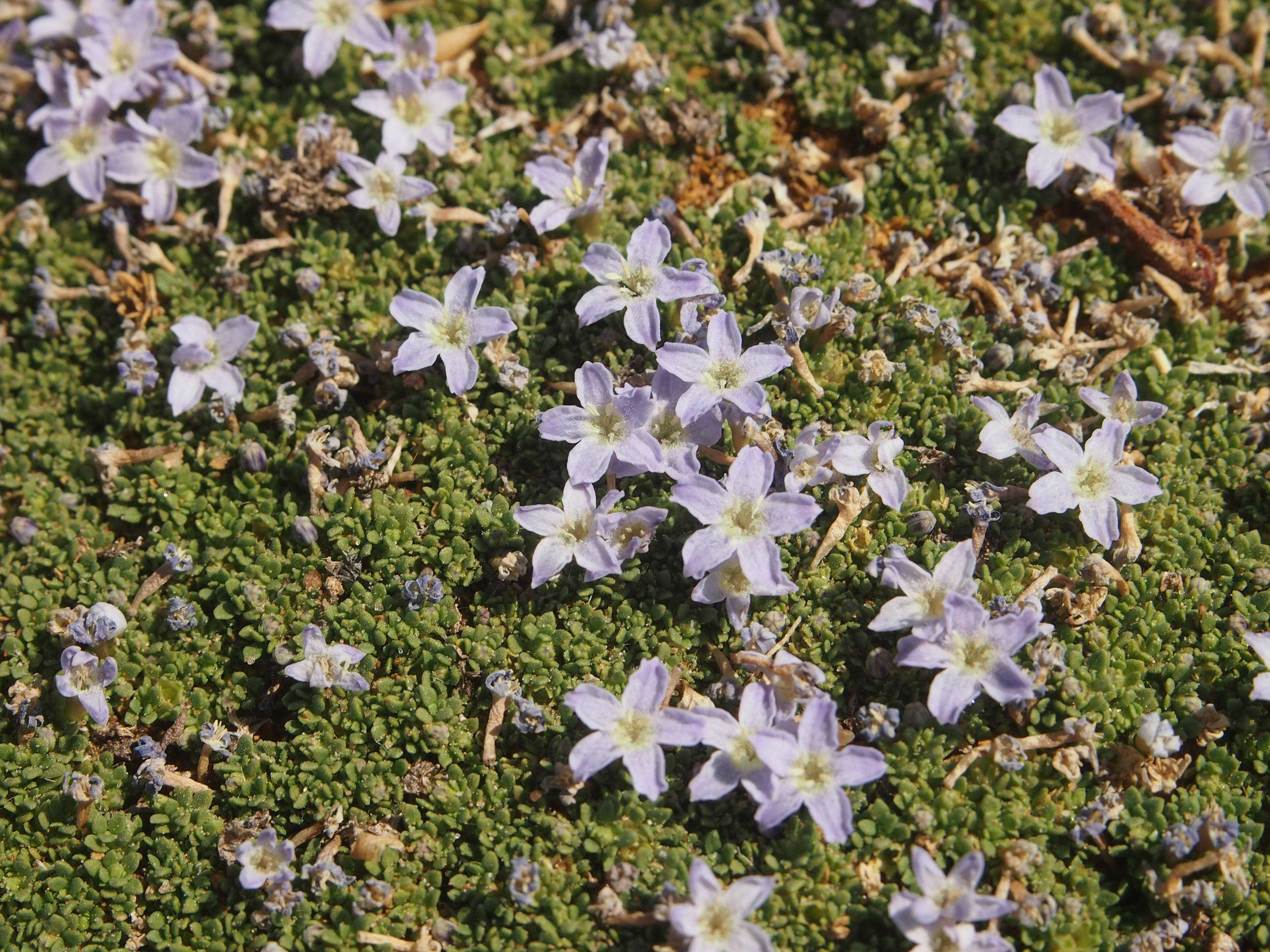
- Dentella pulvinata

Scientific classification
- Kingdom: Plantae
- Clade: Tracheophytes
- Clade: Angiosperms
- Clade: Eudicots
- Clade: Asterids
- Order: Gentianales
- Family: Rubiaceae
- Subfamily: Rubioideae
- Tribe: Spermacoceae
- Genus: Dentella; J.R.Forst. & G.Forst.

Type species
- Dentella repens (L.) J.R.Forst. & G.Forst.

Synonyms
- Heymia Dennst.; Lippaya Endl.

= Dentella =

Genus of plants

Dentella is a genus of flowering plants in the family Rubiaceae. Most species genus are endemic to Australia, with one species also extending through southeast Asia to subtropical Asia and the southwestern Pacific.

== Species ==
- Dentella asperata Airy Shaw - northern Australia
- Dentella browniana Domin - northern Australia
- Dentella concinna Airy Shaw - Burma
- Dentella dioeca Airy Shaw - Australia (Northern Territory)
- Dentella minutissima C.T.White & W.D.Francis - northern Australia
- Dentella misera Airy Shaw - northern Australia
- Dentella pulvinata Airy Shaw - central Australia
- Dentella repens (L.) J.R.Forst. & G.Forst. - from tropical and subtropical Asia to the south-western Pacific
