= Amphistemon =

Scientific classification
- Kingdom: Plantae
- Clade: Tracheophytes
- Clade: Angiosperms
- Clade: Eudicots
- Clade: Asterids
- Order: Gentianales
- Family: Rubiaceae
- Subfamily: Rubioideae
- Tribe: Spermacoceae
- Genus: Amphistemon; Groeninckx

Type species
- Amphistemon humbertii Groeninckx

Genus of plants

Amphistemon is a genus of 2 species of flowering plants in the family Rubiaceae. It is described by Inge Groeninckx in 2010 based on a molecular analysis of the Hedyotis-Oldenlandia group. The genus name is based on the Greek 'amphi-' (=double or of two kinds) and 'stemon' (=stamen) referring to the dimorphic stamen position characteristic for this genus.

== Description ==
Amphistemon are erect perennial herbs or subshrubs with the unique feature in the Hedyotis-Oldenlandia group of having stamens inserted at two distinct levels in the corolla tube, the lower stamens with filaments and anthers shorter than those of the upper stamens.

== Distribution and habitat ==
It is endemic to southwestern and western Madagascar and is found in dry spiny forest-thicket and coastal bushland.

== Taxonomy ==
According to molecular analysis of the genus, it is found to be closely related to Astiella of the species-group Hedyotis-Oldenlandia.

== Species ==
- Amphistemon humbertii Groeninckx
- Amphistemon rakotonasolianus Groeninckx
