= Cyperus kappleri =

Scientific classification
- Kingdom: Plantae
- Clade: Tracheophytes
- Clade: Angiosperms
- Clade: Monocots
- Clade: Commelinids
- Order: Poales
- Family: Cyperaceae
- Genus: Cyperus
- Species: C. kappleri

Binomial name
- Cyperus kappleri Hochst. ex Steud., 1854

Species of sedge

Cyperus kappleri is a species of sedge that is native to northern parts of South America.

== See also ==
- List of Cyperus species
