= Amphiasma =

Scientific classification
- Kingdom: Plantae
- Clade: Tracheophytes
- Clade: Angiosperms
- Clade: Eudicots
- Clade: Asterids
- Order: Gentianales
- Family: Rubiaceae
- Subfamily: Rubioideae
- Tribe: Spermacoceae
- Genus: Amphiasma; Bremek.

Type species
- Amphiasma luzuloides (K. Schum.) Bremek.

Genus of plants

Amphiasma is a genus of 7 species of flowering plants in the family Rubiaceae. It was described by Cornelis Bremekamp in 1952. The genus is found from southern Tanzania to Namibia.

== Species ==
- Amphiasma benguellense (Hiern) Bremek. – Angola, Namibia
- Amphiasma divaricatum (Engl.) Bremek. – Namibia
- Amphiasma luzuloides (K.Schum.) Bremek. – Tanzania, Malawi
- Amphiasma merenskyanum Bremek. – Angola, Namibia
- Amphiasma micranthum (Chiov.) Bremek. – Angola
- Amphiasma redheadii Bremek. – Zambia
- Amphiasma robijnsii Bremek. – Zaïre (Congo-Kinshasa)
