= Tapanhuacanga =

Scientific classification
- Kingdom: Plantae
- Clade: Tracheophytes
- Clade: Angiosperms
- Clade: Eudicots
- Clade: Asterids
- Order: Gentianales
- Family: Rubiaceae
- Genus: Tapanhuacanga; Vell. ex Vand. (1788)

Species
- 11; see text

Synonyms
- Psyllocarpus Mart. & Zucc. (1824)

Genus of plants

Tapanhuacanga is a genus of flowering plants in the family Rubiaceae. It includes 11 species endemic to Brazil.

== Species ==
11 species are accepted.

- Tapanhuacanga asparagoides (Mart. & Zucc.) P.L.R.Moraes
- Tapanhuacanga bahiensis (J.A.M.Carmo, Sobrado & R.M.Salas) P.L.R.Moraes
- Tapanhuacanga campinorum (K.Krause) P.L.R.Moraes
- Tapanhuacanga cururuensis (J.H.Kirkbr.) P.L.R.Moraes
- Tapanhuacanga goiasensis (J.H.Kirkbr.) P.L.R.Moraes
- Tapanhuacanga intermedia (E.L.Cabral & Bacigalupo) P.L.R.Moraes
- Tapanhuacanga laricoides (Mart. & Zucc.) P.L.R.Moraes
- Tapanhuacanga phyllocephala (K.Schum.) P.L.R.Moraes
- Tapanhuacanga psyllocarpoides (Sucre) P.L.R.Moraes
- Tapanhuacanga scatignae (J.A.M.Carmo, Sobrado & R.M.Salas) P.L.R.Moraes
- Tapanhuacanga schwackei (K.Schum.) P.L.R.Moraes

=== Formerly placed here ===
- Diadorimia densifolia (Zappi & Calió) J.A.M.Carmo, Florentín & R.M.Salas (as Tapanhuacanga densifolia (Zappi & Calió) P.L.R.Moraes)
