= Phialiphora =

Scientific classification
- Kingdom: Plantae
- Clade: Tracheophytes
- Clade: Angiosperms
- Clade: Eudicots
- Clade: Asterids
- Order: Gentianales
- Family: Rubiaceae
- Subfamily: Rubioideae
- Tribe: Spermacoceae
- Genus: Phialiphora; Groeninckx

Genus of plants

Phialiphora is a genus of flowering plants in the family Rubiaceae, native to Madagascar.

== Species ==
As of March 2023, Plants of the World Online accepted the following species:

- Phialiphora bevazahensis Groeninckx
- Phialiphora capitulata Groeninckx
- Phialiphora glabrata De Block
- Phialiphora valida De Block
