= Exallage =

Scientific classification
- Kingdom: Plantae
- Clade: Tracheophytes
- Clade: Angiosperms
- Clade: Eudicots
- Clade: Asterids
- Order: Gentianales
- Family: Rubiaceae
- Subfamily: Rubioideae
- Tribe: Spermacoceae
- Genus: Exallage; Bremek.

Type species
- Exallage auricularia (L.) Bremek.

Genus of plants

Exallage is a genus of flowering plants in the family Rubiaceae. The genus is found from tropical and subtropical Asia to the southwestern Pacific.

== Species ==
- Exallage angustifolia (DC.) Bremek.
- Exallage auricularia (L.) Bremek.
- Exallage barbata (Korth.) Bremek.
- Exallage buruensis (Miq.) Bremek.
- Exallage chrysotricha (Palib.) Neupane & N.Wikstr.
- Exallage ciliicaulis (Miq.) Bremek.
- Exallage costata (Roxb.) Bremek.
- Exallage fulva (Hook.f.) Neupane & N.Wikstr.
- Exallage havilandii (King) Bremek.
- Exallage insularis (Spreng.) Neupane & N.Wikstr.
- Exallage kunstleri (King) Bremek.
- Exallage lapeyrousei (DC.) Neupane & N.Wikstr.
- Exallage latifolia (Blume) Bremek.
- Exallage macrophylla (Zoll. & Moritzi) Bremek.
- Exallage microcephala (Pierre ex Pit.) Bremek.
- Exallage pachycarpa (Ridl.) Bremek.
- Exallage paradoxa (Kurz) Bremek.
- Exallage parietarioides (Miq.) Bremek.
- Exallage perhispida (Elmer) Bremek.
- Exallage pressa (Pit.) Bremek.
- Exallage radicans (Bartl. ex DC.) Bremek.
- Exallage ulmifolia (Wall.) Bremek.
