= Paganuccia =

Scientific classification
- Kingdom: Plantae
- Clade: Tracheophytes
- Clade: Angiosperms
- Clade: Eudicots
- Clade: Asterids
- Order: Gentianales
- Family: Rubiaceae
- Subfamily: Rubioideae
- Tribe: Spermacoceae
- Genus: Paganuccia; R.M.Salas
- Species: P. icatuensis

Binomial name
- Paganuccia icatuensis R.M.Salas

Genus of flowering plants

Paganuccia is a monotypic genus of flowering plants in the Rubiaceae family. The genus contains only one species, viz. Paganuccia icatuensis, which is endemic to the continental dunes in the São Francisco River basin, Bahia, north-eastern Brazil. Morphological and molecular phylogenetic analyses support the recognition of this new genus within the Spermacoce clade of the tribe Spermacoceae.
