= Edrastima =

Scientific classification
- Kingdom: Plantae
- Clade: Tracheophytes
- Clade: Angiosperms
- Clade: Eudicots
- Clade: Asterids
- Order: Gentianales
- Family: Rubiaceae
- Subfamily: Rubioideae
- Tribe: Spermacoceae
- Genus: Edrastima; Raf.

Type species
- Edrastima trinervia (Retz.) Neupane & N.Wikstr.

Synonyms
- Edrastenia Raf.

Genus of plants

Edrastima is a genus of flowering plants in the family Rubiaceae. The genus widespread and is found in Central and Eastern USA and the tropics and subtropics.

== Species ==
- Edrastima angolensis (K.Schum.) Neupane & N.Wikstr.
- Edrastima cephalotes (Hochst.) Neupane & N.Wikstr.
- Edrastima goreensis (DC.) Neupane & N.Wikstr.
- Edrastima trinervia (Retz.) Neupane & N.Wikstr.
- Edrastima uniflora (L.) Raf. (formerly Oldenlandia uniflora)
