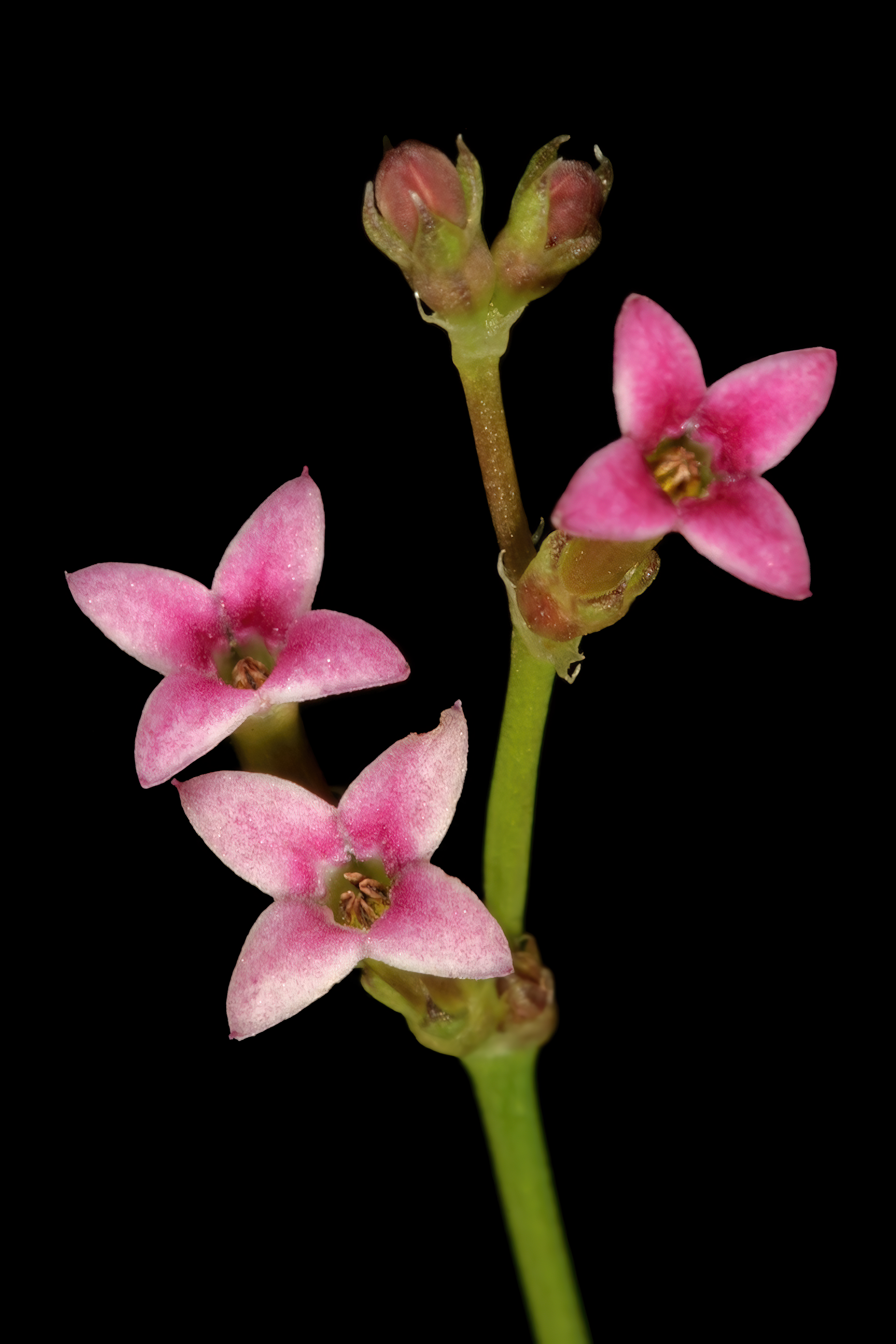
- Cordylostigma virgatum in South Africa

Scientific classification
- Kingdom: Plantae
- Clade: Tracheophytes
- Clade: Angiosperms
- Clade: Eudicots
- Clade: Asterids
- Order: Gentianales
- Family: Rubiaceae
- Subfamily: Rubioideae
- Tribe: Spermacoceae
- Genus: Cordylostigma; Groeninckx & Dessein

Type species
- Kohautia longifolia Klotzsch

= Cordylostigma =

Genus of plants

Cordylostigma is a genus in the Rubiaceae. The name was coined in 2010 to contain 9 species formerly belonging to the related genus Kohautia. The nine species are native to tropical and southern Africa from Guinea to Somalia to South Africa, as well as Madagascar, Comoros, and Réunion.

== Species ==
- Cordylostigma amboense (Schinz) Groeninckx & Dessein
- Cordylostigma cicendioides (K.Schum.) Groeninckx & Dessein
- Cordylostigma cuspidatum (K.Schum.) Groeninckx & Dessein
- Cordylostigma longifolium (Klotzsch) Groeninckx & Dessein
- Cordylostigma microcala (Bremek.) Groeninckx & Dessein
- Cordylostigma obtusilobum (Hiern) Groeninckx & Dessein
- Cordylostigma prolixipes (S.Moore) Groeninckx & Dessein
- Cordylostigma stellarioides (Hiern) Groeninckx & Dessein
- Cordylostigma virgatum (Willd.) Groeninckx & Dessein
