= Gomphocalyx =

Scientific classification
- Kingdom: Plantae
- Clade: Tracheophytes
- Clade: Angiosperms
- Clade: Eudicots
- Clade: Asterids
- Order: Gentianales
- Family: Rubiaceae
- Subfamily: Rubioideae
- Tribe: Spermacoceae
- Genus: Gomphocalyx; Baker
- Species: G. herniarioides

Binomial name
- Gomphocalyx herniarioides Baker

Genus of plants

Gomphocalyx is a monotypic genus of flowering plants in the family Rubiaceae. The genus contains only one species, viz. Gomphocalyx herniarioides, which is endemic to Madagascar.
