= Carterella =

Scientific classification
- Kingdom: Plantae
- Clade: Tracheophytes
- Clade: Angiosperms
- Clade: Eudicots
- Clade: Asterids
- Order: Gentianales
- Family: Rubiaceae
- Subfamily: Rubioideae
- Tribe: Spermacoceae
- Genus: Carterella; Terrell
- Species: C. alexanderae

Binomial name
- Carterella alexanderae (A.M.Carter) Terrell

Synonyms
- Bouvardia alexanderae A.M.Carter; Hedyotis alexanderae (A.M.Carter) W.H.Lewis

Genus of plants

Carterella is a monotypic genus of flowering plants in the family Rubiaceae. The genus contains only one species, viz. Carterella alexanderae, which is endemic to Baja California Sur in Mexico. It grows on steep slopes in the mountains.

== Description ==
This species is a woody perennial that grows 30 to 60 cm tall, with terete stems. The leaves are 15 to 45 mm long, and 3 to 10 mm wide, opposite or occasionally formed in whorls of three, shaped linear-lanceolate, and acute at their apex.

The flowers grow on a 5 to 12 flowered compact cyme, borne on pedicels up to 1 cm long. There are 4 calyx lobes, shaped lance-linear, and 4 to 5 mm long, 1 to 1.5 mm wide at the base. The corolla is salverform and colored white, with the corolla tube 2.5 to 3.5 cm long, the throat 2 mm in diameter, and the lobes shaped oblong, 8 to 10 mm long and 4 to 5 mm wide. The seeds are wingless.

== Taxonomy ==
The specific epithet was named by Annetta M. Carter in memory of her friend Annie M. Alexander, who assisted Carter in botanizing the Baja California Peninsula. The genus is named in honor of Carter herself, after the species was found not to belong in Bouvardia or Hedyotis.

== Distribution ==
This plant is endemic to Baja California Sur and occurs only in the Cape region. The type specimen was found growing on steep granite talus.
