= Debia =

Scientific classification
- Kingdom: Plantae
- Clade: Tracheophytes
- Clade: Angiosperms
- Clade: Eudicots
- Clade: Asterids
- Order: Gentianales
- Family: Rubiaceae
- Subfamily: Rubioideae
- Tribe: Spermacoceae
- Genus: Debia; Neupane & N.Wikstr.

Type species
- Debia oligocephala (Pierre ex Pit.) Neupane & N.Wikstr.

Genus of plants

Debia is a genus of flowering plants in the family Rubiaceae. The genus is found from the Indian subcontinent to south-central China and the Philippines.

== Species ==
- Debia andamanica (Kurz) Neupane & N.Wikstr.
- Debia krewanhensis (Pierre ex Pit.) Neupane & N.Wikstr.
- Debia oligocephala (Pierre ex Pit.) Neupane & N.Wikstr.
- Debia ovatifolia (Cav.) Neupane & N.Wikstr.
