= Lelya =

Scientific classification
- Kingdom: Plantae
- Clade: Embryophytes
- Clade: Tracheophytes
- Clade: Spermatophytes
- Clade: Angiosperms
- Clade: Eudicots
- Clade: Asterids
- Order: Gentianales
- Family: Rubiaceae
- Genus: Lelya; Bremek.

Synonyms
- Lelya prostrata W.H.Lewis; Lelya prostrata var. elongata Verdc.; Spermacoce prostrata R.D.Good

Genus of plants

Lelya is a monotypic genus of flowering plants belonging to the family Rubiaceae. It only contains one known species, Lelya osteocarpa Bremek.

Its native range is Tropical Africa. It is found in Angola, Malawi, Nigeria, Tanzania, Zambia and Zaïre.

The genus name of Lelya is in honour of Hugh Vandervaes Lely (1891–1947), an English botanist and forester in Nigeria. Both genus and species were first described and published in Verh. Kon. Ned. Akad. Wetensch., Afd. Natuurk., Sect. 2, Vol.48 (Issue 2) on page 181 in 1952.
