= Dimetia =

Scientific classification
- Kingdom: Plantae
- Clade: Tracheophytes
- Clade: Angiosperms
- Clade: Eudicots
- Clade: Asterids
- Order: Gentianales
- Family: Rubiaceae
- Subfamily: Rubioideae
- Tribe: Spermacoceae
- Genus: Dimetia (Wight & Arn.) Meisn.

Type species
- Dimetia scandens (Roxb.) R.J.Wang

Genus of plants

Dimetia is a genus of flowering plants in the family Rubiaceae. The genus is found from the Indian subcontinent to south-central China and west and central Malesia.

== Species ==
- Dimetia ampliflora (Hance) Neupane & N.Wikstr.
- Dimetia capitellata (Wall. ex G.Don) Neupane & N.Wikstr.
- Dimetia dianxiensis (W.C.Ko) Neupane & N.Wikstr.
- Dimetia obliquinervis (Merr.) Neupane & N.Wikstr.
- Dimetia pitardiana (Craib) Neupane & N.Wikstr.
- Dimetia scandens (Roxb.) R.J.Wang
