= Manostachya =

Scientific classification
- Kingdom: Plantae
- Clade: Tracheophytes
- Clade: Angiosperms
- Clade: Eudicots
- Clade: Asterids
- Order: Gentianales
- Family: Rubiaceae
- Genus: Manostachya; Bremek.

Genus of plants

Manostachya is a genus of flowering plants belonging to the family Rubiaceae.

Its native range is Tanzania to Eastern Tropical Africa.

== Species ==
Species:

- Manostachya juncoides (K.Schum.) Bremek.
- Manostachya staelioides (K.Schum.) Bremek.
- Manostachya ternifolia E.S.Martins
