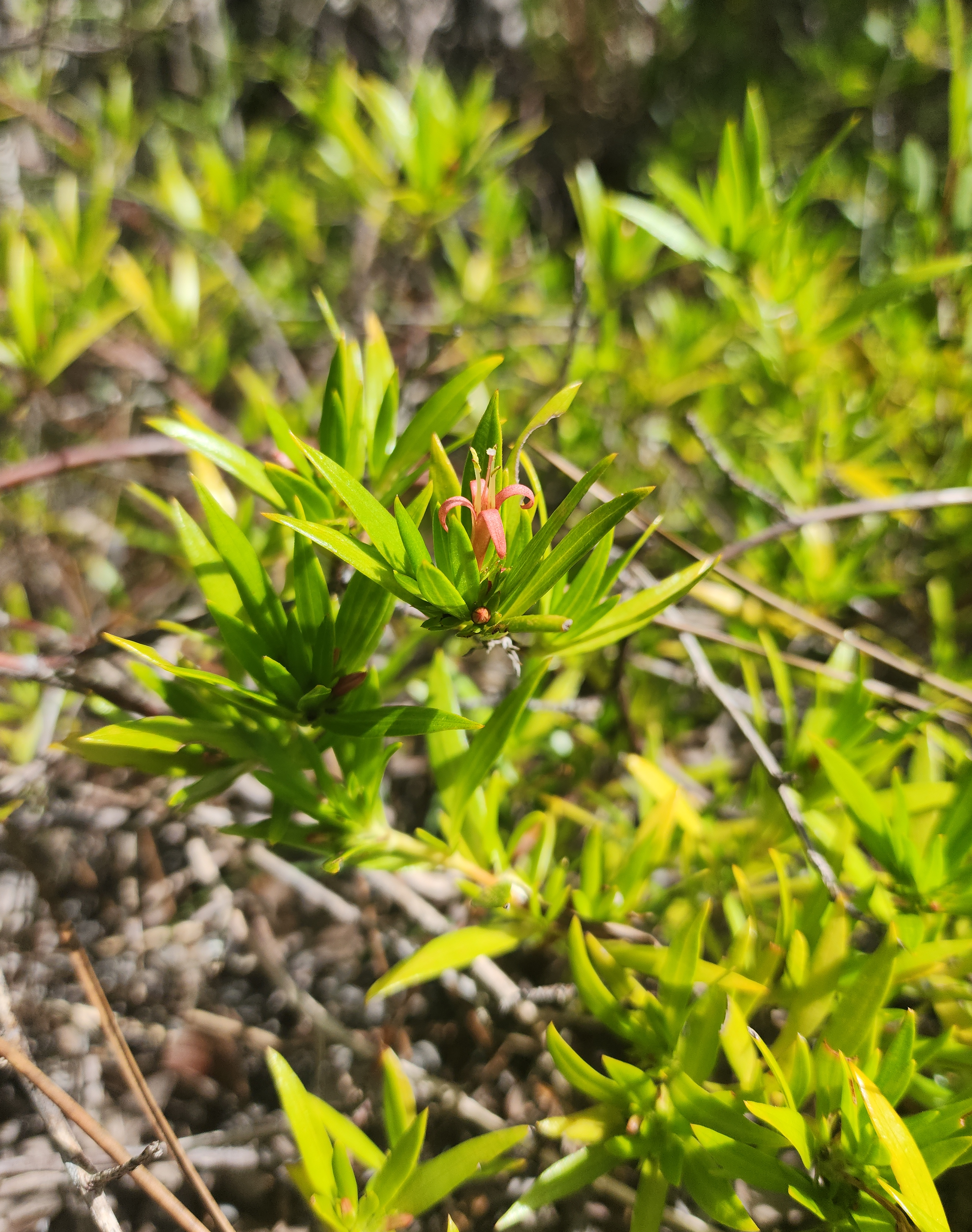
- Blooming in open canopy pine rockland

Conservation status
- Apparently Secure (NatureServe)

Scientific classification
- Kingdom: Plantae
- Clade: Tracheophytes
- Clade: Angiosperms
- Clade: Eudicots
- Clade: Asterids
- Order: Gentianales
- Family: Rubiaceae
- Genus: Ernodea
- Species: E. cokeri

Binomial name
- Ernodea cokeri Britton ex Coker

= Ernodea cokeri =

Species of flowering plant

Ernodea cokeri, commonly referred to as Coker's beach creeper or one-nerve ernodea, is a species of flowering plant endemic to extreme southern Florida and the northern Bahamas.

== Habitat ==
It only occurs in the calcareous pine habitats of the region, where limestone is often exposed at the surface. These include the pine rockland in Florida's Miami-Dade and Monroe counties, and the pineyards of Bahamas' northern archipelago.

== Conservation ==
In Florida, where it is regarded as critically imperiled, the pine rockland habitat this species relies on has been historically devastated by development such that this species is now known from only 3 sites. Additionally, its conservation status in the Bahamas is unknown.

== Gallery ==
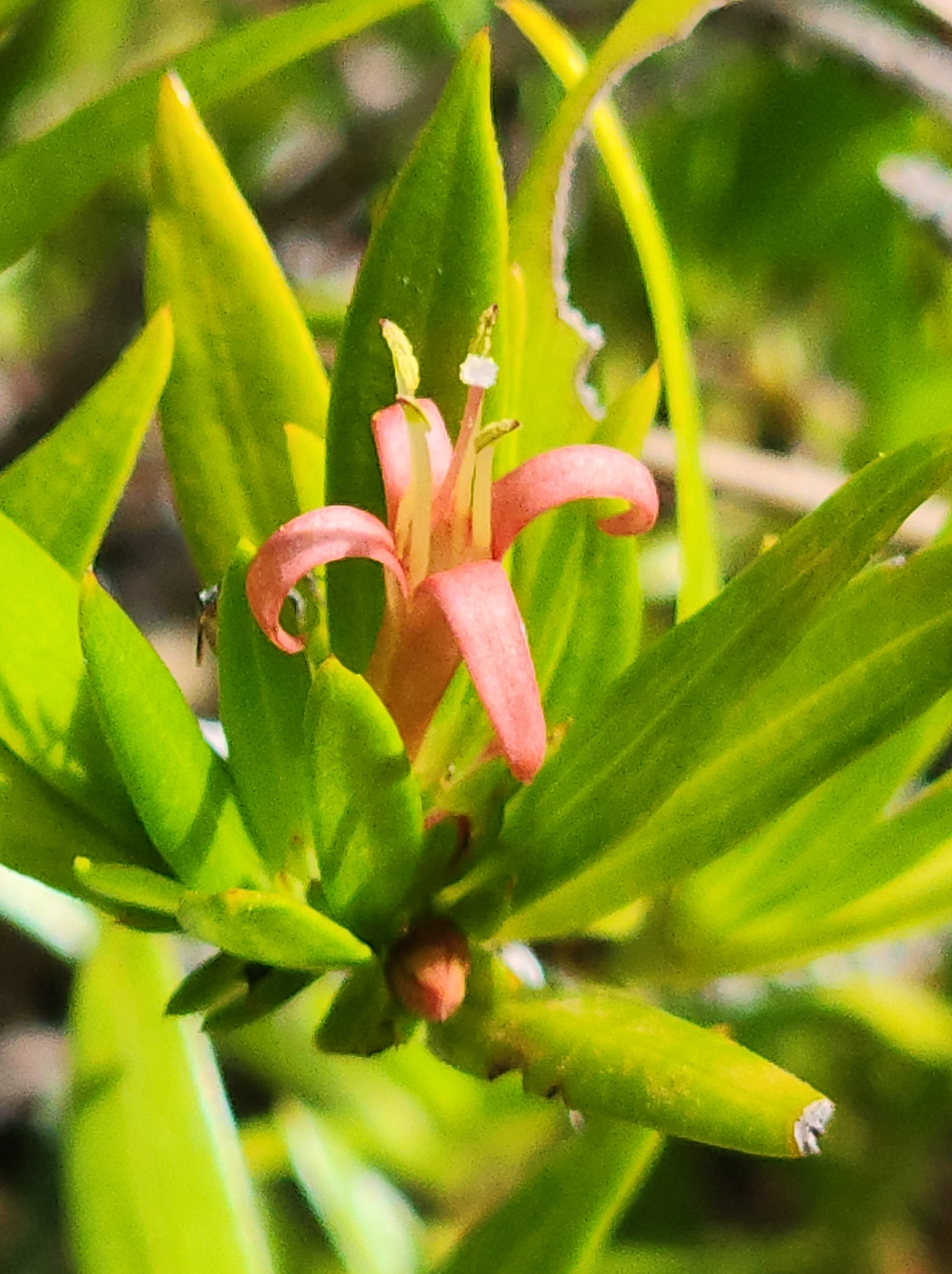
