= Lathraeocarpa =

Scientific classification
- Kingdom: Plantae
- Clade: Tracheophytes
- Clade: Angiosperms
- Clade: Eudicots
- Clade: Asterids
- Order: Gentianales
- Family: Rubiaceae
- Genus: Lathraeocarpa; Bremek.

Genus of plants

Lathraeocarpa is a genus of flowering plants belonging to the family Rubiaceae.

Its native range is Madagascar.

Species:

- Lathraeocarpa acicularis Bremek.
- Lathraeocarpa decaryi Bremek.
