= Hedythyrsus =

Scientific classification
- Kingdom: Plantae
- Clade: Tracheophytes
- Clade: Angiosperms
- Clade: Eudicots
- Clade: Asterids
- Order: Gentianales
- Family: Rubiaceae
- Genus: Hedythyrsus; Bremek.

Genus of plants

Hedythyrsus is a genus of flowering plants belonging to the family Rubiaceae.

Its native range is Central and Eastern Tropical Africa.

Species:

- Hedythyrsus katangensis Niyongabo & Dessein
- Hedythyrsus spermacocinus (K.Schum.) Bremek.
- Hedythyrsus thamnoideus (K.Schum.) Bremek.
