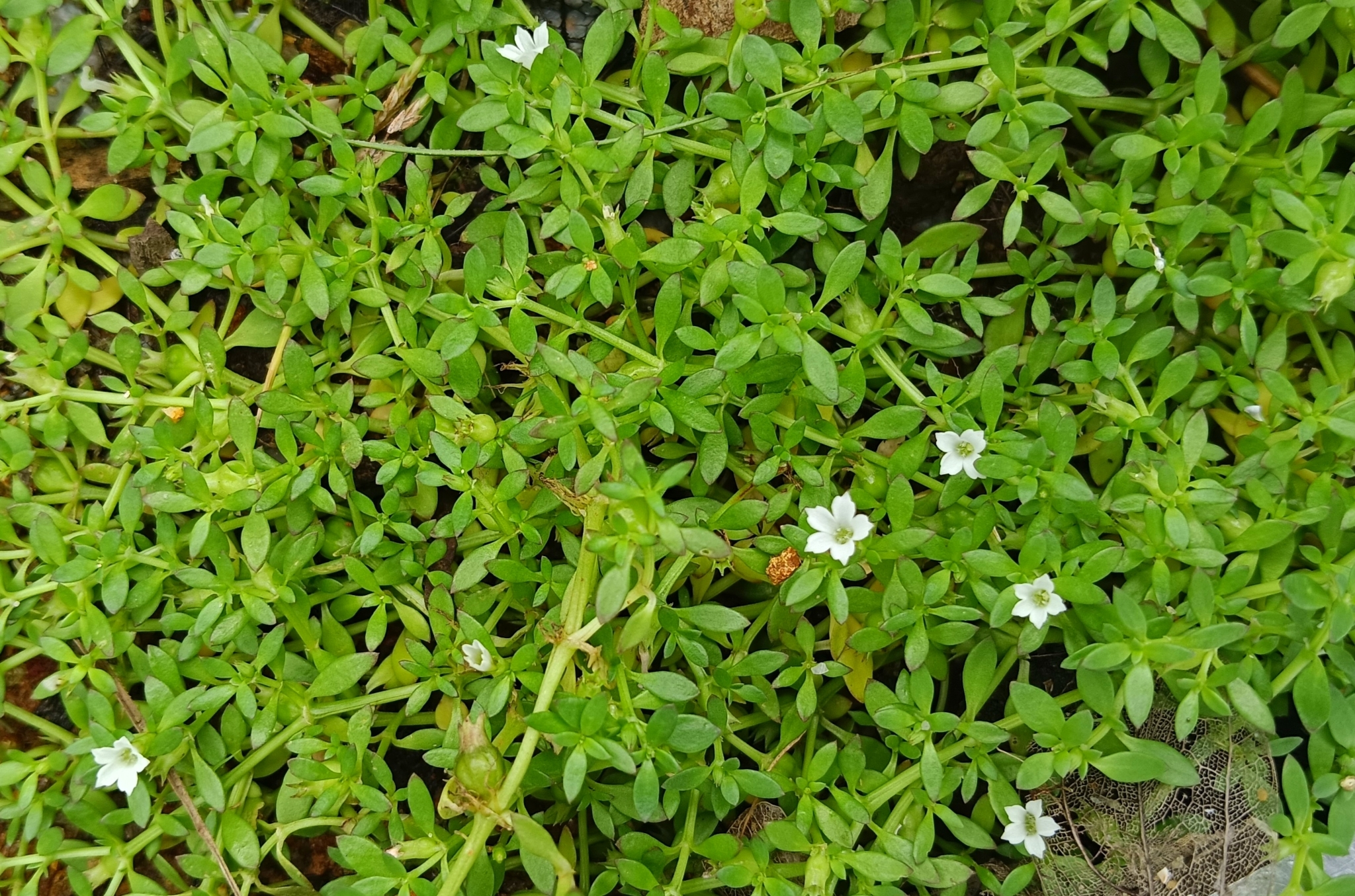

Scientific classification
- Kingdom: Plantae
- Clade: Tracheophytes
- Clade: Angiosperms
- Clade: Eudicots
- Clade: Asterids
- Order: Gentianales
- Family: Rubiaceae
- Genus: Dentella
- Species: D. repens

Binomial name
- Dentella repens (L.) J.R.Forst. & G.Forst.

= Dentella repens =

Species of plant

Dentella repens, the creeping dentella, is a slender, prostrate herb that grows in low-lying areas, riverbanks, and clayey soils up to 350 m elevation. It has dichotomous branches that root at the nodes, opposite subsessile leaves, and interpetiolar stipules. The small white funnel-shaped flowers are solitary, axillary, and often borne in V-shaped forks of branches, with a hairy calyx and a two-celled ovary. Flowering and fruiting occur throughout the year, and the species is assessed as Least Concern (LC).
