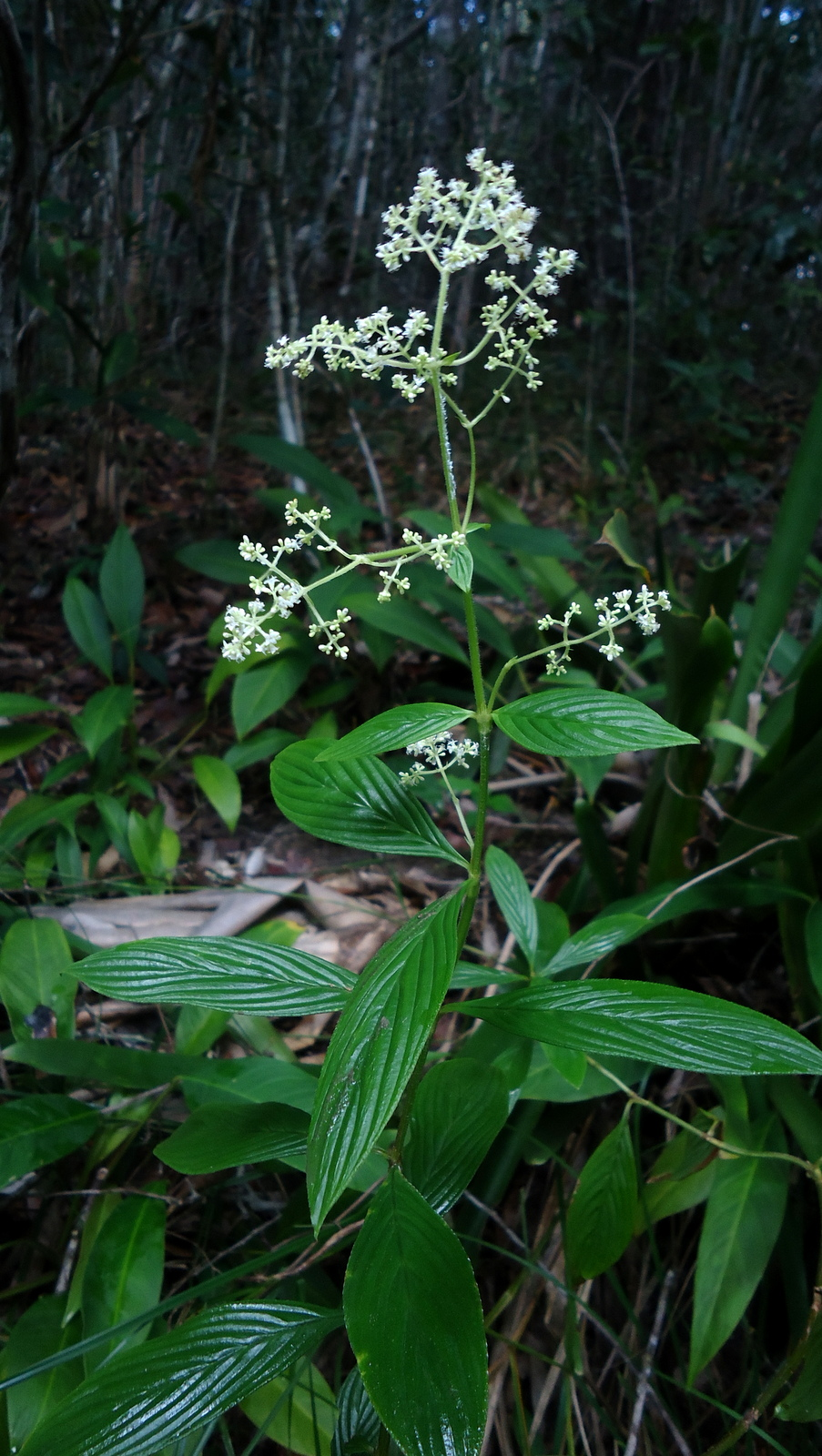
- Emmeorhiza umbellata

Scientific classification
- Kingdom: Plantae
- Clade: Tracheophytes
- Clade: Angiosperms
- Clade: Eudicots
- Clade: Asterids
- Order: Gentianales
- Family: Rubiaceae
- Subfamily: Rubioideae
- Tribe: Spermacoceae
- Genus: Emmeorhiza; Pohl ex Endl.
- Species: E. umbellata

Binomial name
- Emmeorhiza umbellata (Spreng.) K.Schum.

Synonyms
- Genus: Endlichera C.Presl; Species: Bigelovia umbellata (Spreng.) Spreng.; Borreria aralioides Cham. & Schltdl.; Borreria umbellata Spreng.; Emmeorhiza brasiliensis (C.Presl) Walp.; Emmeorhiza pohliana C.Presl; Emmeorhiza umbellata subsp. septentrionalis Steyerm.; Emmeorhiza umbellata var. pubens Steyerm.; Emmeorhiza umbellata var. tomentosa K.Schum. ex Steyerm.; Endlichera brasiliensis C.Presl; Endlichera umbellata (Spreng.) K.Schum.

= Emmeorhiza =

Genus of plants

Emmeorhiza is a monotypic genus of flowering plants in the family Rubiaceae. The genus contains only one species, viz. Emmeorhiza umbellata, which is found from northern Trinidad to tropical South America.
