= Involucrella =

Scientific classification
- Kingdom: Plantae
- Clade: Tracheophytes
- Clade: Angiosperms
- Clade: Eudicots
- Clade: Asterids
- Order: Gentianales
- Family: Rubiaceae
- Subfamily: Rubioideae
- Tribe: Spermacoceae
- Genus: Involucrella (Benth. & Hook.f.) Neupane & N.Wikstr.

Type species
- Involucrella coronaria (Kurz) Neupane & N.Wikstr.

Genus of plants

Involucrella is a genus of flowering plants in the family Rubiaceae. The genus is found from Northeast India to Hainan and Peninsular Malaysia and the Philippines.

== Species ==
- Involucrella chereevensis (Pierre ex Pit.) Neupane & N.Wikstr.
- Involucrella coronaria (Kurz) Neupane & N.Wikstr.
