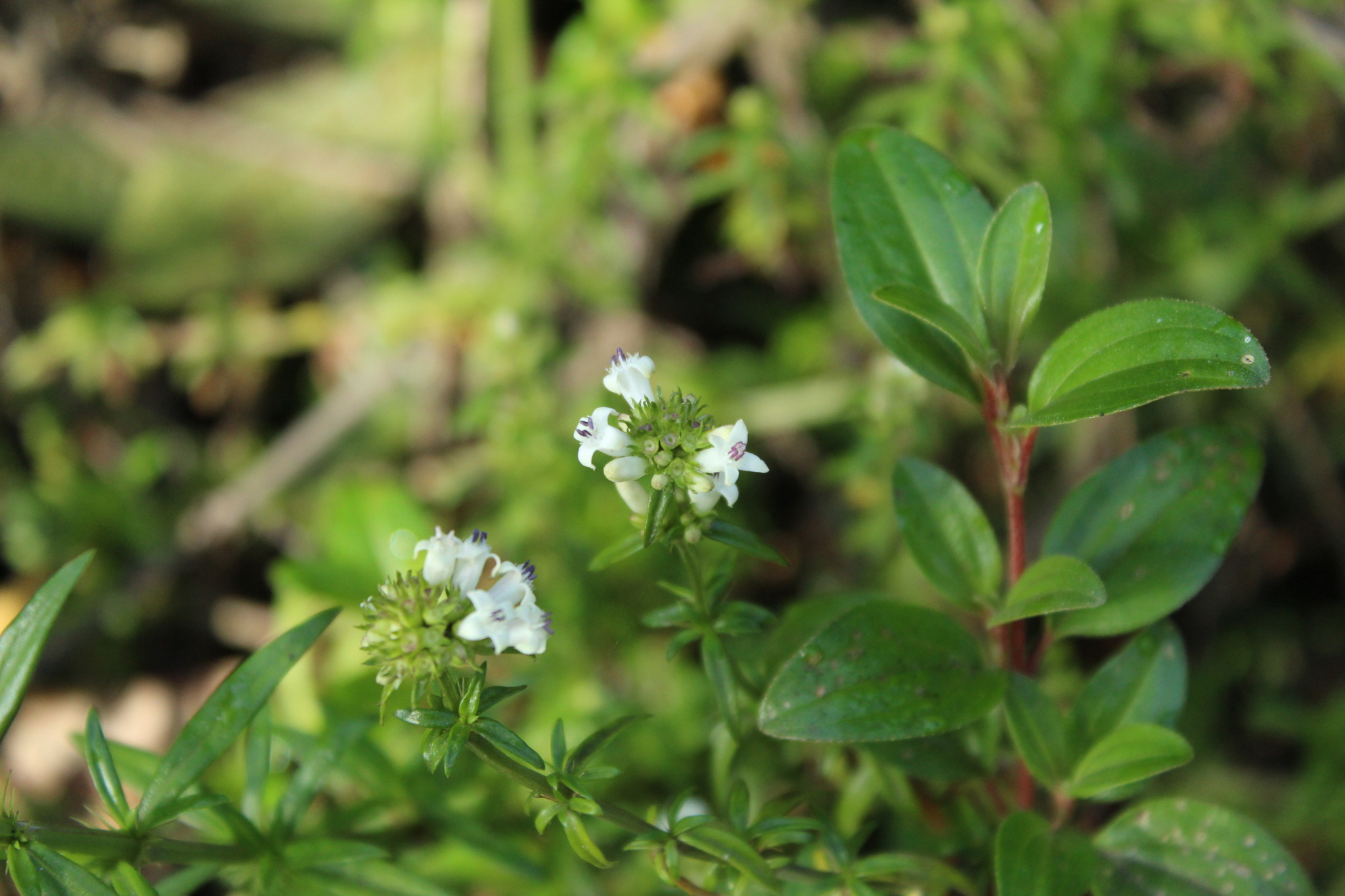
- Galianthe bogotensis

Scientific classification
- Kingdom: Plantae
- Clade: Tracheophytes
- Clade: Angiosperms
- Clade: Eudicots
- Clade: Asterids
- Order: Gentianales
- Family: Rubiaceae
- Subfamily: Rubioideae
- Tribe: Spermacoceae
- Genus: Galianthe; Griseb.

= Galianthe =

Genus of plants

Galianthe is a genus of flowering plants in the family Rubiaceae. The genus is found from Mexico to tropical America.

== Species ==
- Galianthe andersonii E.L.Cabral
- Galianthe angustifolia (Cham. & Schltdl.) E.L.Cabral
- Galianthe aurelii E.L.Cabral
- Galianthe bisepala E.L.Cabral
- Galianthe bogotensis (Willd.) E.L.Cabral & Bacigalupo
- Galianthe boliviana E.L.Cabral
- Galianthe brasiliensis (Spreng.) E.L.Cabral & Bacigalupo
- Galianthe canindeyuensis E.L.Cabral
- Galianthe centranthoides (Cham. & Schltdl.) E.L.Cabral
- Galianthe chiquitosiana E.L.Cabral
- Galianthe chodatiana (Standl.) E.L.Cabral
- Galianthe cymosa (Cham.) E.L.Cabral & Bacigalupo
- Galianthe cyperoides (Chodat) E.L.Cabral
- Galianthe dichotoma (Willd.) E.L.Cabral & Bacigalupo
- Galianthe elegans E.L.Cabral
- Galianthe equisetoides (Cham. & Schltdl.) E.L.Cabral
- Galianthe eupatorioides (Cham. & Schltdl.) E.L.Cabral
- Galianthe fastigiata Griseb.
- Galianthe gertii E.L.Cabral
- Galianthe grandifolia E.L.Cabral
- Galianthe guaranitica (Chodat) E.L.Cabral
- Galianthe hassleriana (Chodat) E.L.Cabral
- Galianthe hispidula (A.Rich. ex DC.) E.L.Cabral & Bacigalupo
- Galianthe humilis E.L.Cabral & Bacigalupo
- Galianthe kempffiana E.L.Cabral
- Galianthe krausei (Suess.) E.L.Cabral
- Galianthe lanceifolia E.L.Cabral
- Galianthe latistipula E.L.Cabral
- Galianthe laxa (Cham. & Schltdl.) E.L.Cabral
- Galianthe liliifolia (Standl.) E.L.Cabral
- Galianthe linearifolia E.L.Cabral
- Galianthe longifolia (Standl.) E.L.Cabral
- Galianthe longisepala E.L.Cabral
- Galianthe macedoi E.L.Cabral
- Galianthe matogrossiana E.L.Cabral
- Galianthe montesii E.L.Cabral
- Galianthe parvula E.L.Cabral
- Galianthe peruviana (Pers.) E.L.Cabral
- Galianthe polygonoides E.L.Cabral & Bacigalupo
- Galianthe pseudopetiolata E.L.Cabral
- Galianthe ramosa E.L.Cabral
- Galianthe reitzii E.L.Cabral
- Galianthe souzae E.L.Cabral & Bacigalupo
- Galianthe sudyungensis E.L.Cabral
- Galianthe thalictroides (K.Schum.) E.L.Cabral
- Galianthe vaginata E.L.Cabral & Bacigalupo
- Galianthe valerianoides (Cham. & Schltdl.) E.L.Cabral
- Galianthe verbenoides (Cham. & Schltdl.) Griseb.
