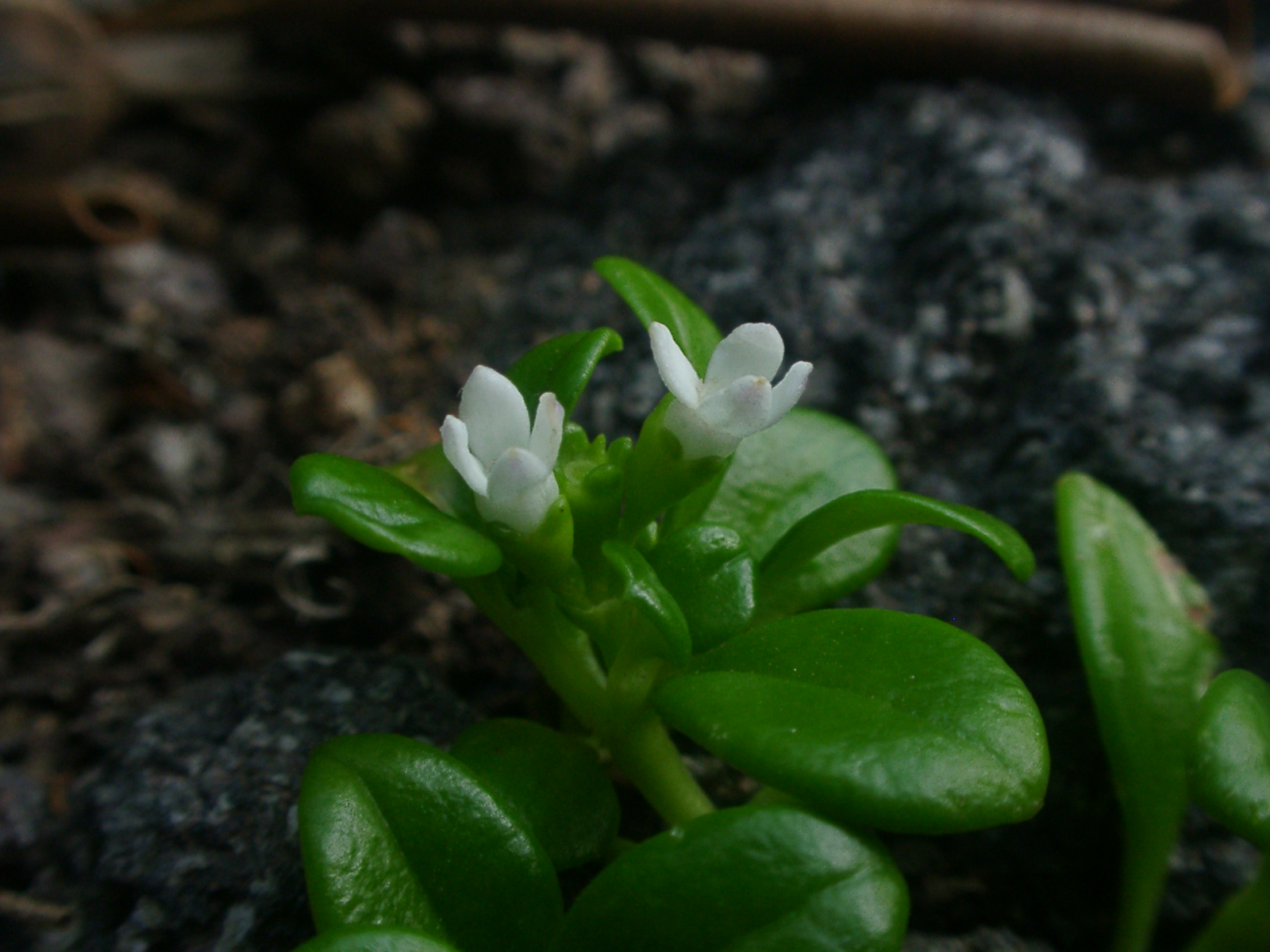

Scientific classification
- Kingdom: Plantae
- Clade: Tracheophytes
- Clade: Angiosperms
- Clade: Eudicots
- Clade: Asterids
- Order: Gentianales
- Family: Rubiaceae
- Genus: Leptopetalum
- Species: L. biflorum

Binomial name
- Leptopetalum biflorum (L.) Neupane & N.Wikstr.

Synonyms
- Gonotheca biflora (L.) Masam.; Hedyotis biflora (L.) Lam.; Oldenlandia biflora L.; Thecagonum biflorum (L.) Babu; (incomplete list)

= Leptopetalum biflorum =

Species of plant

Leptopetalum biflorum, synonym Hedyotis biflora, is a species of flowering plant in the family Rubiaceae.

== Description ==
Leptopetalum biflorum is an annual or perennial plant measuring up to 15–30 cm in height.
