= Leptopetalum pachyphyllum =

Scientific classification
- Kingdom: Plantae
- Clade: Tracheophytes
- Clade: Angiosperms
- Clade: Eudicots
- Clade: Asterids
- Order: Gentianales
- Family: Rubiaceae
- Genus: Leptopetalum
- Species: L. pachyphyllum

Binomial name
- Leptopetalum pachyphyllum (Tuyama) Naiki & Ohi-Toma

Synonyms
- Hedyotis pachyphylla Tuyama

Species of flowering plant

Leptopetalum pachyphyllum is a species of flowering plant in the family Rubiaceae, native to the Volcano Islands, belonging to Japan.
