= Anthospermopsis =

Scientific classification
- Kingdom: Plantae
- Clade: Tracheophytes
- Clade: Angiosperms
- Clade: Eudicots
- Clade: Asterids
- Order: Gentianales
- Family: Rubiaceae
- Subfamily: Rubioideae
- Tribe: Spermacoceae
- Genus: Anthospermopsis (K.Schum.) J.H.Kirkbr.
- Species: A. catechosperma

Binomial name
- Anthospermopsis catechosperma (K.Schum.) J.H.Kirkbr.

Genus of plants

Anthospermopsis is a monotypic genus of flowering plants in the family Rubiaceae. It was described by Joseph Harold Kirkbride Jr. in 1997. The genus contains only one species, viz. Anthospermopsis catechosperma, which is endemic to Bahia, Brazil.
