= Planaltina lanigera =

Scientific classification
- Kingdom: Plantae
- Clade: Tracheophytes
- Clade: Angiosperms
- Clade: Eudicots
- Clade: Asterids
- Order: Gentianales
- Family: Rubiaceae
- Genus: Planaltina
- Species: P. lanigera

Binomial name
- Planaltina lanigera (DC.) R.M.Salas & E.L.Cabral (2010)

Synonyms
- Diodia lanigera Pohl ex DC. (1830), not validly publ.; Staelia lanigera (DC.) K.Schum. (1888); Tessiera lanigera DC. in Prodr. 4: 574 (1830) (basionym)

Species of flowering plant

Planaltina lanigera is a species of flowering plant in the family Rubiaceae. It is a subshrub or shrub native to northern, west-central, and southeastern Brazil, ranging from Tocantins to Minas Gerais states.
