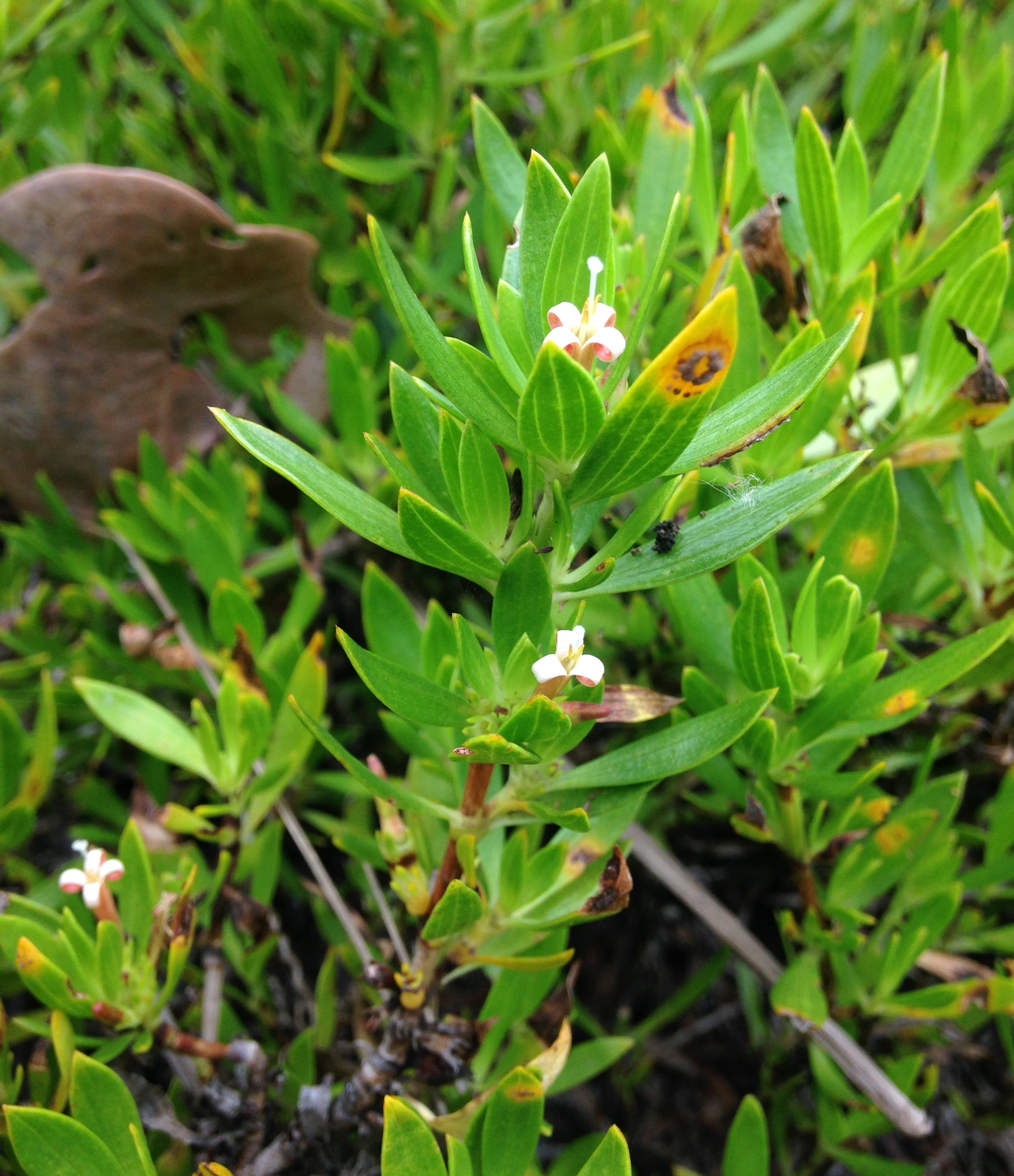

Conservation status
- Apparently Secure (NatureServe)

Scientific classification
- Kingdom: Plantae
- Clade: Tracheophytes
- Clade: Angiosperms
- Clade: Eudicots
- Clade: Asterids
- Order: Gentianales
- Family: Rubiaceae
- Genus: Ernodea
- Species: E. littoralis

Binomial name
- Ernodea littoralis Sw.

= Ernodea littoralis =

Species of plant

Ernodea littoralis, commonly called beech creeper or coughbush, is a species of flowering plant in the coffee family (Rubiaceae). It is native to the Florida in the United States, the Caribbean region, and Central America south to Honduras. It is found in sunny, open areas with sandy soil, in habitats such as in pinelands and dunes. It is tolerant of high salt conditions, and of human disturbance.

It is a vine-like ground cover, 1 to 3 feet in height, with small, light green, succulent leaves on long, curving, bright red branches, and pinkish white, tubular flowers succeeded by golden berries.
