= Pogonospermum serotinum =

Conservation status
- Least Concern (IUCN 3.1)

Scientific classification
- Kingdom: Plantae
- Clade: Tracheophytes
- Clade: Angiosperms
- Clade: Eudicots
- Clade: Asterids
- Order: Lamiales
- Family: Acanthaceae
- Genus: Pogonospermum
- Species: P. serotinum

Binomial name
- Pogonospermum serotinum (P.G.Mey.) I.Darbysh. & Kiel (2022)

Synonyms
- Justicia serotina (P.G.Mey.) J.C.Manning & Goldblatt (2014); Monechma serotinum P.G.Mey. (1973)

Species of flowering plant

Pogonospermum serotinum is a species of plant in the family Acanthaceae. It is endemic to Namibia. Its natural habitat is rocky areas.
