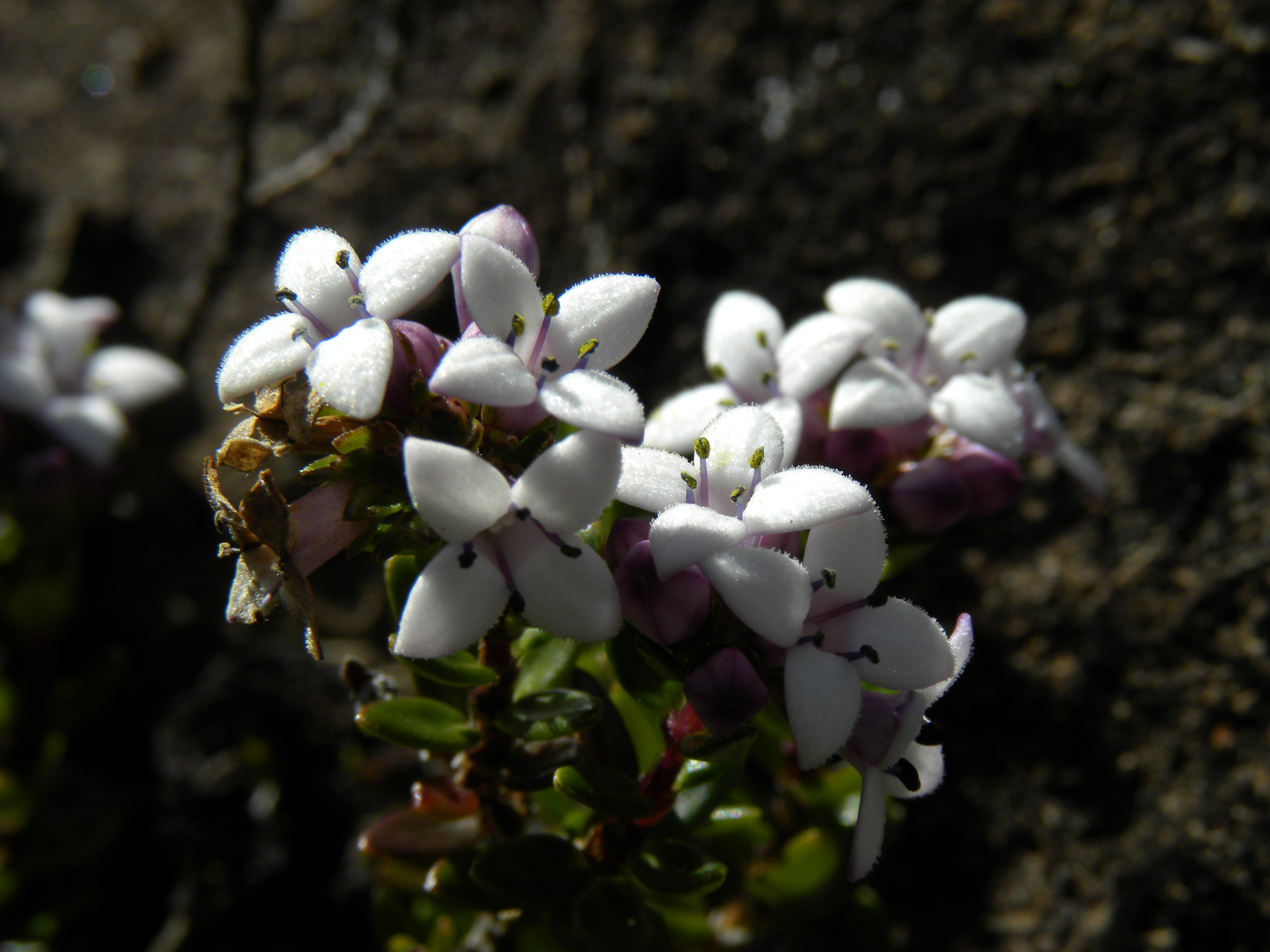
- Arcytophyllum lavarum

Scientific classification
- Kingdom: Plantae
- Clade: Tracheophytes
- Clade: Angiosperms
- Clade: Eudicots
- Clade: Asterids
- Order: Gentianales
- Family: Rubiaceae
- Subfamily: Rubioideae
- Tribe: Spermacoceae
- Genus: Arcytophyllum; Willd. ex Schult. & Schult.f.

Synonyms
- Anotis DC.; Ereicoctis (DC.) Kuntze; Mallostoma H.Karst.; Pseudrachicallis H.Karst.; Teinosolen Hook.f.

= Arcytophyllum =

Genus of flowering plants

Arcytophyllum is a genus of flowering plants in the family Rubiaceae. The genus contains 18 species, distributed from New Mexico to Bolivia.

== Description ==
Members of this genus are shrubs or dwarf shrubs that occupy mountainous habitats. Their leaves are oppositely arranged, small, sessile or sub-sessile, and possess inconspicuous secondary venation. Flowers are tetra- or pentamerous, with the stamens adnate to the white or pink funnelform or salverform corolla. The fruit is a capsule with septicidal dehiscence.

== Species ==
- Arcytophyllum aristatum Standl. - Colombia, Ecuador
- Arcytophyllum cachirense (H.Karst.) K.Schum. - Colombia
- Arcytophyllum capitatum (Benth.) K.Schum. - Colombia, Ecuador
- Arcytophyllum ciliolatum Standl. - Ecuador, Perú
- Arcytophyllum ericoides (Willd. ex Roem. & Schult.) Standl. - Ecuador, Perú
- Arcytophyllum fasciculatum (A.Gray) Terrell & H.Rob. - New Mexico, Texas, Coahuila
- Arcytophyllum filiforme (Ruiz & Pav.) Standl. - Bolivia, Perú, Ecuador, Colombia
- Arcytophyllum lavarum K.Schum. - Costa Rica, Panamá
- Arcytophyllum macbridei Standl. - Amazonas (of Perú)
- Arcytophyllum muticum (Wedd.) Standl. - Costa Rica, Panamá, Colombia, Ecuador, Venezuela
- Arcytophyllum nitidum (Kunth) Schltdl. - Colombia, Venezuela
- Arcytophyllum peruvianum (Wernham) J.H.Kirkbr. - Perú
- Arcytophyllum rivetii Danguy & Cherm. - Ecuador, Perú
- Arcytophyllum serpyllaceum (Schltdl.) Terrell - Guatemala, Chiapas, Veracruz, Oaxaca
- Arcytophyllum setosum (Ruiz & Pav.) Schltdl. - Bolivia, Perú, Ecuador, Colombia
- Arcytophyllum thymifolium (Ruiz & Pav.) Standl. - Colombia, Ecuador, Perú
- Arcytophyllum venezuelanum Steyerm. - Venezuela
- Arcytophyllum vernicosum Standl. - Ecuador, Peru

== Phylogeny and biogeography ==
Arcytophyllum is a monophyletic genus when A. serpyllaceum is excluded, as this species has been shown to be more closely related to Bouvardia but has not been formally transferred to another genus. The remaining species are most closely related to the North American and Caribbean genus Houstonia (including Stenaria) and one species of the polyphyletic genus Oldenlandia (Oldenlandia microtheca) distributed in Mexico and Central America, indicating that Arcytophyllum may be one of the few cases in the family Rubiaceae of a southward migration to reach the Andes. The center of diversity is in South America; namely in Ecuador, where 10 species are documented.

== Floral morphology and evolution ==
Flowers of Arcytophyllum are distylous, meaning that two morphs exist differing in the vertical orientation of anthers and stigmas. Pin morphs have stigmas positioned above the anthers, while thrum morphs have stigmas positioned below the anthers. A study of 11 species showed significantly higher seed production in thrum than pin morphs of A. aristatum, A. lavarum, and A. vernicosum, and a similar tendency in all other sampled species. In contrast, pin morphs of A. lavarum cross pollinate more efficiently than thrum morphs, thus transmitting more of their genes to the next generation via pollen than seed. As better exporters of pollen to flowers of the opposite morph, long-styled A. lavarum give rise to disassortative pollen flow and a division in reproductive functions between the morphs. If pollinators promote the condition of distyly and asymmetric pollen flow over evolutionary time, it is plausible that gender specialization will evolve into dioecy.
