= Schwendenera =

Scientific classification
- Kingdom: Plantae
- Clade: Tracheophytes
- Clade: Angiosperms
- Clade: Eudicots
- Clade: Asterids
- Order: Gentianales
- Family: Rubiaceae
- Subfamily: Rubioideae
- Tribe: Spermacoceae
- Genus: Schwendenera; K.Schum.
- Species: S. tetrapyxis

Binomial name
- Schwendenera tetrapyxis K.Schum.

Genus of plants

Schwendenera is a monotypic genus of flowering plants in the family Rubiaceae. The genus contains only one species, viz. Schwendenera tetrapyxis, which is endemic to Brazil.
