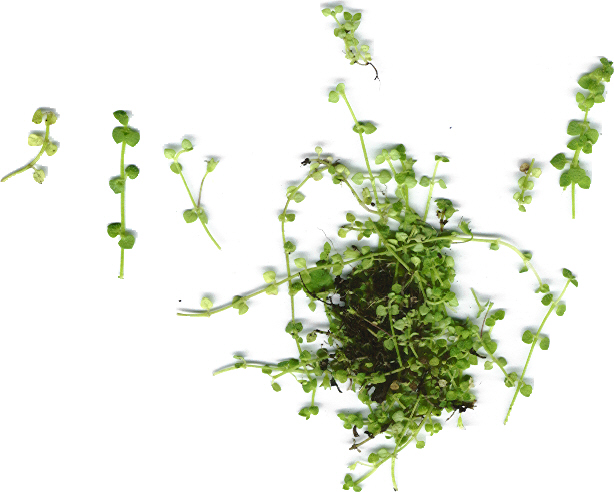
- Oldenlandiopsis callitrichoides

Scientific classification
- Kingdom: Plantae
- Clade: Tracheophytes
- Clade: Angiosperms
- Clade: Eudicots
- Clade: Asterids
- Order: Gentianales
- Family: Rubiaceae
- Subfamily: Rubioideae
- Tribe: Spermacoceae
- Genus: Oldenlandiopsis; Terrell & W.H.Lewis
- Species: O. callitrichoides

Binomial name
- Oldenlandiopsis callitrichoides (Griseb.) Terrell & W.H.Lewis

Synonyms
- Hedyotis callitrichoides (Griseb.) W.H.Lewis; Oldenlandia callitrichoides Griseb.

= Oldenlandiopsis =

Genus of flowering plants

Oldenlandiopsis (creeping-bluet) is a genus of flowering plants in the family Rubiaceae. It is monospecific, comprising only one species, Oldenlandiopsis callitrichoides. This species had previously been placed in Hedyotis or in Oldenlandia. It is native to the West Indies, southern Mexico, and Central America. It is naturalized elsewhere, including Florida, Hawaii, South America, and tropical Africa.

Oldenlandiopsis was established in 1990 by Edward E. Terrell and Walter H. Lewis. The generic name indicates a likeness to Oldenlandia. The specific epithet refers to a superficial resemblance to Callitriche, a genus in Plantaginaceae. Oldenlandiopsis callitrichoides was first described in 1862 by August Grisebach as Oldenlandia callitrichoides in a pre-print of a paper that was published the following year in Memoirs of the American Academy of Arts and Sciences.

Oldenlandiopsis is a member of the tribe Spermacoceae. Within the tribe, it is not especially close to Oldenlandia, as had been previously thought. It is very closely related to, and perhaps sister to Houstonia.
