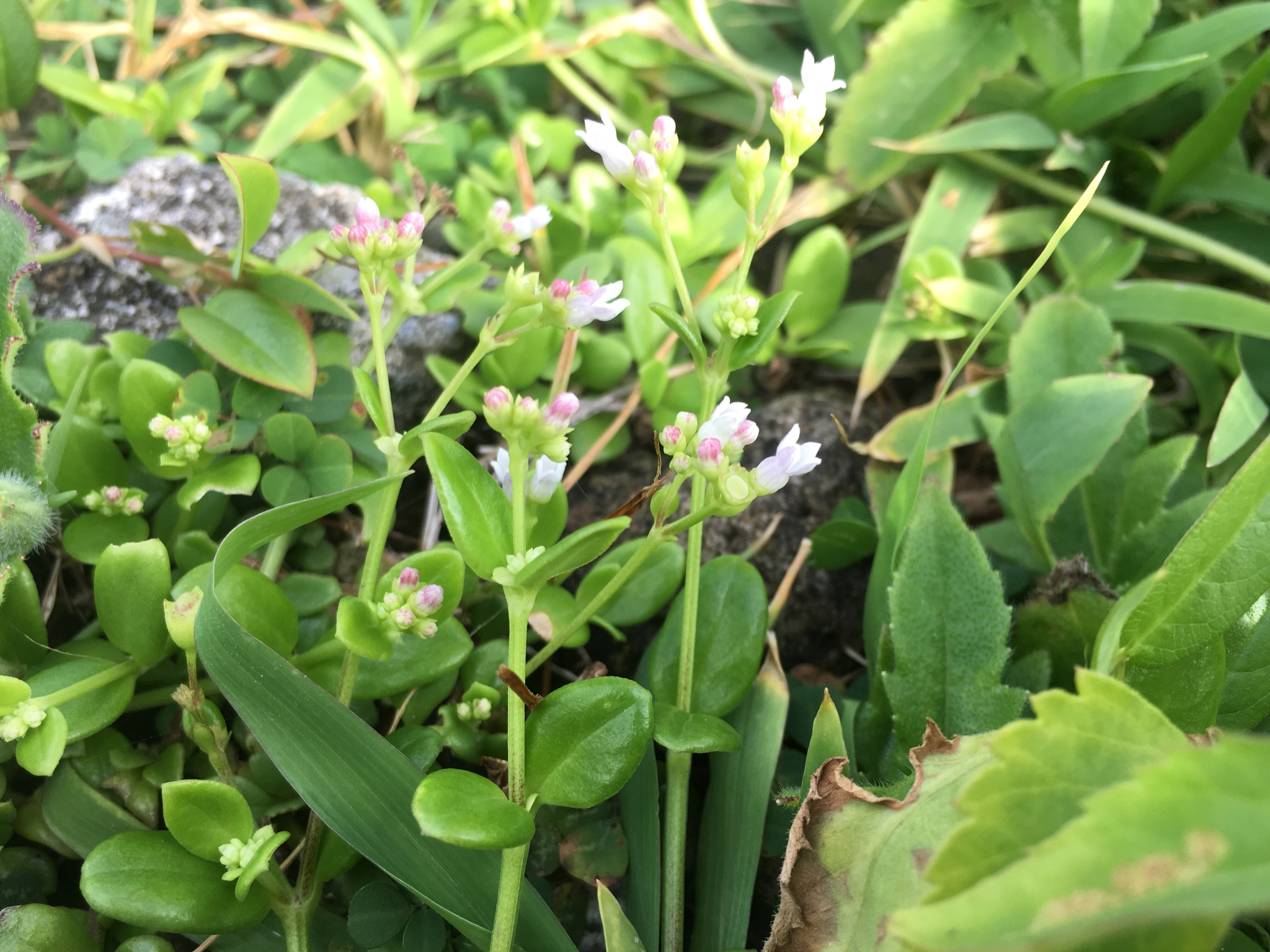
- Leptopetalum racemosum

Scientific classification
- Kingdom: Plantae
- Clade: Tracheophytes
- Clade: Angiosperms
- Clade: Eudicots
- Clade: Asterids
- Order: Gentianales
- Family: Rubiaceae
- Subfamily: Rubioideae
- Tribe: Spermacoceae
- Genus: Leptopetalum; Hook. & Arn.

Type species
- Leptopetalum mexicanum Hook. & Arn.

Synonyms
- Gonotheca Blume ex DC.; Thecagonum Babu

= Leptopetalum =

Genus of plants

Leptopetalum is a genus of flowering plants in the family Rubiaceae. The genus is widespread in tropical and subtropical Asia and the Pacific.

== Species ==
As of March 2023, Plants of the World Online accepted the following species:

- Leptopetalum biflorum (L.) Neupane & N.Wikstr.
- Leptopetalum coreanum (H.Lév.) Naiki & Ohi-Toma
- Leptopetalum foetidum (G.Forst.) Neupane & N.Wikstr.
- Leptopetalum grayi (Hook.f.) Hatus.
- Leptopetalum mexicanum Hook. & Arn.
- Leptopetalum pachyphyllum (Tuyama) Naiki & Ohi-Toma
- Leptopetalum pteritum (Blume) Neupane & N.Wikstr.
- Leptopetalum racemosum (Lam.) Shih H.Chen & M.J.Wu
- Leptopetalum strigulosum (DC.) Neupane & N.Wikstr.
- Leptopetalum taiwanense (S.F.Huang & J.Murata) Shih H.Chen & M.J.Wu
