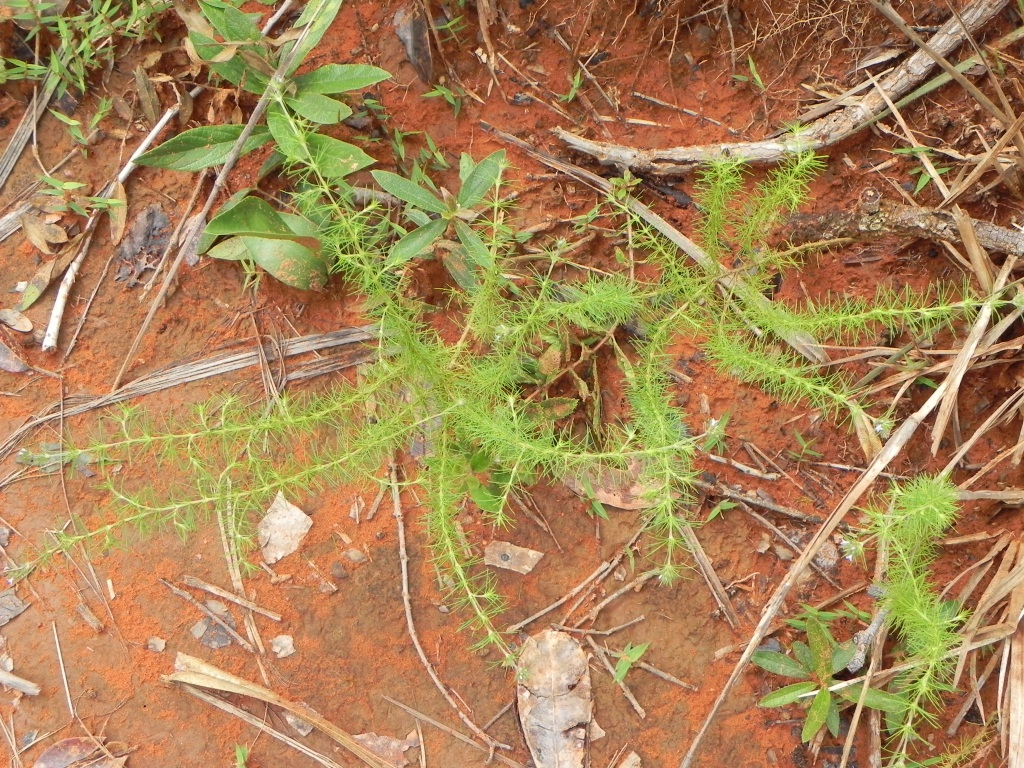
- Psyllocarpus phyllocephalus found in Brazil

Scientific classification
- Kingdom: Plantae
- Clade: Tracheophytes
- Clade: Angiosperms
- Clade: Eudicots
- Clade: Asterids
- Order: Gentianales
- Family: Rubiaceae
- Genus: Psyllocarpus; Mart. & Zucc.

= Psyllocarpus =

Genus of plants

Psyllocarpus is a genus of flowering plants belonging to the family Rubiaceae. It is an endemic genus of Brazil found in Amazonia, Caatinga, and Cerrado. In 1979 the genus was revised by Kirkbride into two sections, Psyllocarpus sect. Psyllocarpus and P. sect Amazonica, based on geographic distribution and morphology. Plants of the World Online treats the genus as a synonym of Tapanhuacanga.

== Species ==
- Psyllocarpus asparagoides Mart. & Zucc.
- Psyllocarpus bahiensis J.A.M.Carmo, Sobrado & R.M.Salas
- Psyllocarpus campinorum (K.Krause) J.H.Kirkbr.
- Psyllocarpus cururuensis J.H.Kirkbr.
- Psyllocarpus densifolius Zappi & Calió
- Psyllocarpus goiasensis J.H.Kirkbr.
- Psyllocarpus intermedius E.L.Cabral & Bacigalupo
- Psyllocarpus itakangapyra J.A.M.Carmo, Sobrado & R.M.Salas
- Psyllocarpus laricoides Mart. & Zucc.
- Psyllocarpus phyllocephalus K.Schum.
- Psyllocarpus psyllocarpoides (Sucre) J.H.Kirkbr.
- Psyllocarpus scatignae J.A.M.Carmo, Sobrado & R.M.Salas
- Psyllocarpus schwackei K.Schum.
- Psyllocarpus vianae J.A.M.Carmo, Sobrado & R.M.Salas

Psyllocarpus sect. Psyllocarpus comprises P. asparagoides, P. bahiensis, P. goiasensis, P. laricoides, P. phyllocephalus, P. scatignae, P. schwackei. Psyllocarpus sect. Amazonica includes P. campinorum, P. cururuensis, P. psyllocarpoides.

Psyllocarpus intermedius and Psyllocarpus densifolius are found in the same geographical region at sect. Psyllocarpus but are morphologically distinct. Carmo et al. (2021) recognized the monotypic genus Diadorimia to accommodate P. densifolius, while the determination of P. intermedius is pending further investigation.
