= Planaltina (plant) =

Scientific classification
- Kingdom: Plantae
- Clade: Tracheophytes
- Clade: Angiosperms
- Clade: Eudicots
- Clade: Asterids
- Order: Gentianales
- Family: Rubiaceae
- Subfamily: Rubioideae
- Tribe: Spermacoceae
- Genus: Planaltina; R.M.Salas & E.L.Cabral (2010)

species
- Planaltina angustata (Steyerm.) R.M.Salas, Cabaña Fader & E.L.Cabral; Planaltina capitata (K.Schum.) R.M.Salas & E.L.Cabral; Planaltina lanigera (DC.) R.M.Salas & E.L.Cabral; Planaltina myndeliana R.M.Salas & E.L.Cabral

Genus of flowering plants

Planaltina is a genus of flowering plants in the family Rubiaceae. It includes four species native to Brazil, ranging from northern to west-central and southeastern Brazil.

- Planaltina angustata (Steyerm.) R.M.Salas, Cabaña Fader & E.L.Cabral – Goiás
- Planaltina capitata (K.Schum.) R.M.Salas & E.L.Cabral – Goiás and Brasília
- Planaltina lanigera (DC.) R.M.Salas & E.L.Cabral – Tocantins to Minas Gerais
- Planaltina myndeliana R.M.Salas & E.L.Cabral – Goiás
