= Carajasia =

Scientific classification
- Kingdom: Plantae
- Clade: Tracheophytes
- Clade: Angiosperms
- Clade: Eudicots
- Clade: Asterids
- Order: Gentianales
- Family: Rubiaceae
- Subfamily: Rubioideae
- Tribe: Spermacoceae
- Genus: Carajasia; R.M.Salas, E.L.Cabral & Dessein
- Species: C. cangae

Binomial name
- Carajasia cangae R.M.Salas, E.L.Cabral & Dessein

Genus of plants

Carajasia is a monotypic genus of flowering plants in the family Rubiaceae. The genus contains only one species, viz. Carajasia cangae, which is found on the mountain summits of Serra dos Carajás (Pará, Brazil).
