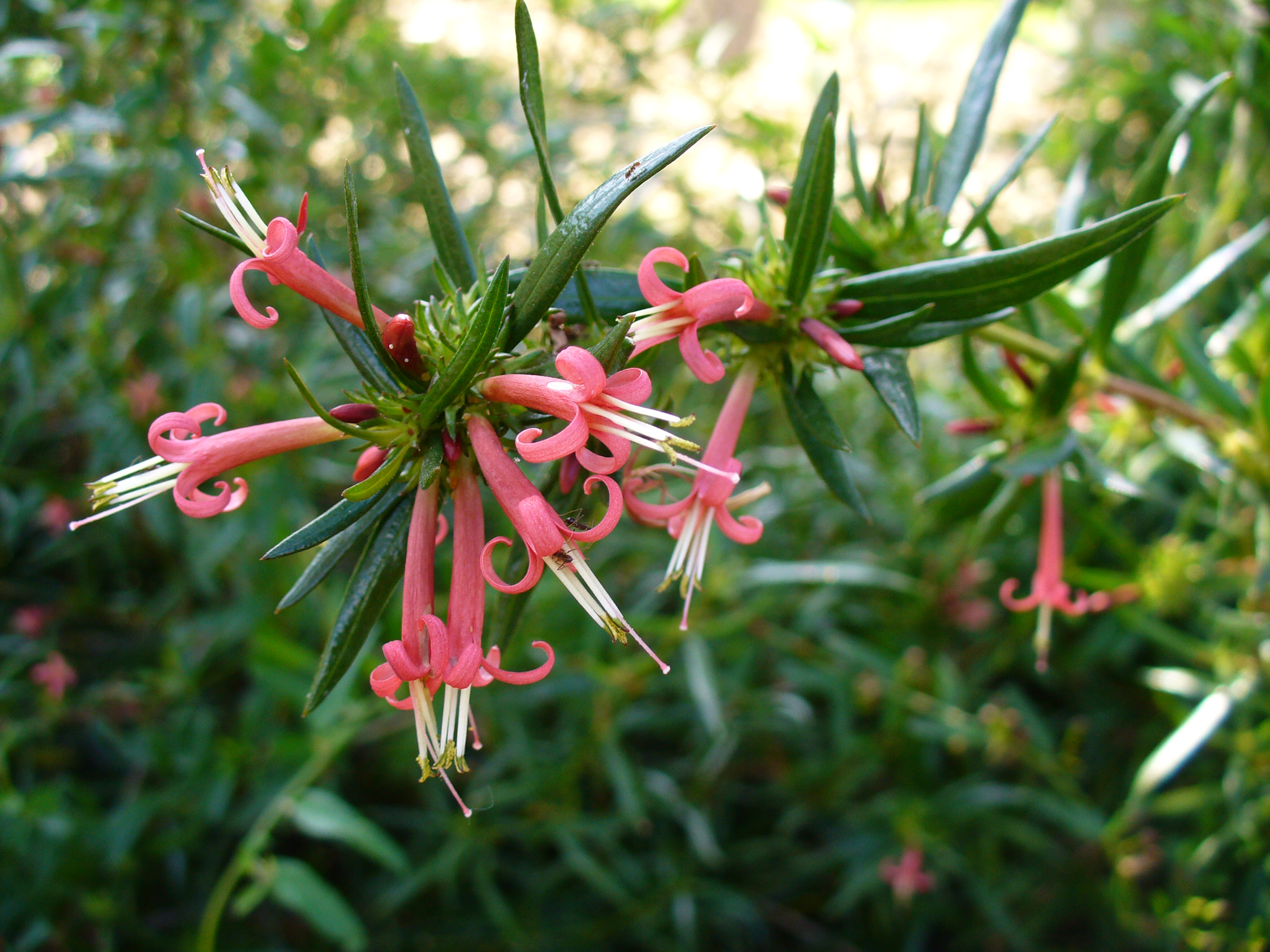
- Ernodea littoralis

Scientific classification
- Kingdom: Plantae
- Clade: Tracheophytes
- Clade: Angiosperms
- Clade: Eudicots
- Clade: Asterids
- Order: Gentianales
- Family: Rubiaceae
- Subfamily: Rubioideae
- Tribe: Spermacoceae
- Genus: Ernodea; Sw.

Type species
- Ernodea littoralis Sw.

= Ernodea =

Genus of flowering plants

Ernodea is a genus of flowering plants in the family Rubiaceae. All species are small shrubs endemic to the Caribbean region, with most species restricted to the Bahamian Archipelago.

== Species ==
- Ernodea angusta Small - Florida, The Bahamas
- Ernodea cokeri Britton ex Coker - Florida, The Bahamas
- Ernodea gigantea Correll - The Bahamas
- Ernodea littoralis Sw. - Florida, Mexico, Belize, The Bahamas, Cayman Islands, Cuba, Dominican Republic, Haiti, Jamaica, Leeward Islands, Netherlands Antilles, Puerto Rico, Turks and Caicos Islands, Windward Islands, Colombia
- Ernodea millspaughii Britton - The Bahamas, Turks and Caicos Islands
- Ernodea nashii Britton - The Bahamas
- Ernodea serratifolia Correll - The Bahamas, Turks and Caicos Islands
- Ernodea taylori Britton - The Bahamas, Cayman Islands, Cuba, Haiti
