= Tessiera =

Scientific classification
- Kingdom: Plantae
- Clade: Tracheophytes
- Clade: Angiosperms
- Clade: Eudicots
- Clade: Asterids
- Order: Gentianales
- Family: Rubiaceae
- Genus: Tessiera; DC.

Synonyms
- Diphragmus C.Presl

Genus of plants

Tessiera is a genus of flowering plants belonging to the family Rubiaceae.

It is native to Mexico.

The genus name of Tessiera is in honour of Henri-Alexandre Tessier (1741–1837), a French doctor and agronomist. It was first described and published in Prodr. Vol.4 on page 574 in 1830.

== Known species ==
According to Kew:

- Tessiera hexasepala (Borhidi & Lozada-Pérez) R.M.Salas & E.L.Cabral
- Tessiera lithospermoides DC.
