= Staelia =

Scientific classification
- Kingdom: Plantae
- Clade: Tracheophytes
- Clade: Angiosperms
- Clade: Eudicots
- Clade: Asterids
- Order: Gentianales
- Family: Rubiaceae
- Genus: Staelia; Cham. & Schltdl.

Genus of plants

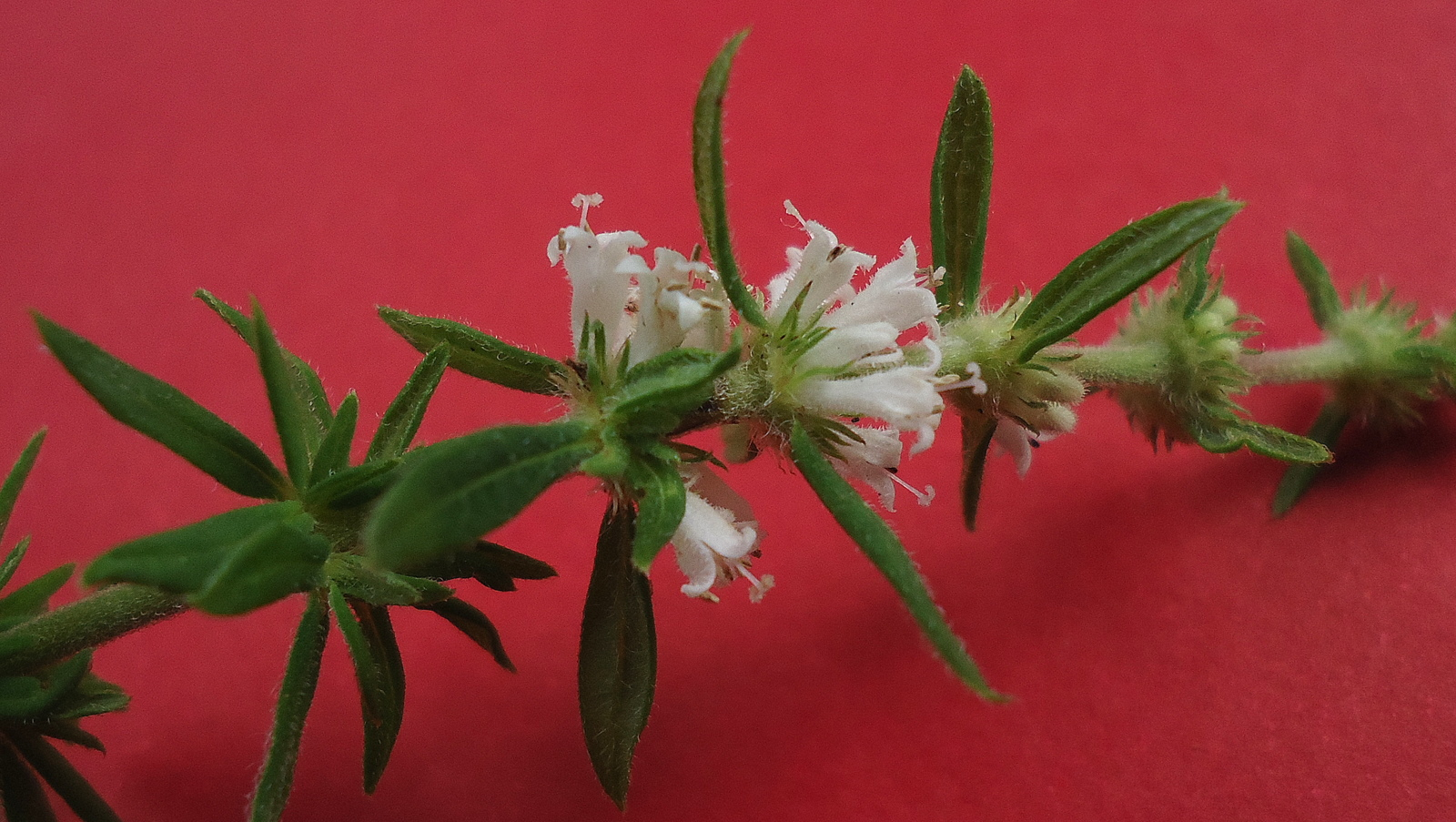
Staelia galioides

Staelia is a genus of flowering plants belonging to the family Rubiaceae.

Its native range is Brazil to northern Argentina.

The genus name of Staelia is in honour of Auguste Louis de Staël-Holstein (1790–1827), a French philanthropist. It was first described and published in Linnaea Vol.3 on page 364 in 1828.

== Known species ==
According to Kew:

- Staelia aurea K.Schum.
- Staelia catolensis R.M.Salas & E.L.Cabral
- Staelia culcita R.M.Salas & E.L.Cabral
- Staelia domingosii R.M.Salas & E.L.Cabral
- Staelia galioides DC.
- Staelia glandulosa R.M.Salas & E.L.Cabral
- Staelia harleyi R.M.Salas & E.L.Cabral
- Staelia hassleri Standl.
- Staelia hatschbachii J.H.Kirkbr.
- Staelia juarezii E.L.Cabral & Salas
- Staelia longipedicellata R.M.Salas & E.L.Cabral
- Staelia nelidae R.M.Salas & E.L.Cabral
- Staelia paganuccii R.M.Salas & E.L.Cabral
- Staelia reflexa DC.
- Staelia thymbroides (Mart. ex Mart. & Zucc.) K.Schum.
- Staelia thymoides Cham. & Schltdl.
- Staelia tocantinsiana R.M.Salas & E.L.Cabral
- Staelia uruguaya Arechav.
- Staelia vestita K.Schum.
- Staelia virgata (Willd.) K.Schum.
