= Pentanopsis =

Scientific classification
- Kingdom: Plantae
- Clade: Tracheophytes
- Clade: Angiosperms
- Clade: Eudicots
- Clade: Asterids
- Order: Gentianales
- Family: Rubiaceae
- Genus: Pentanopsis; Rendle

Genus of plants

Pentanopsis is a genus of flowering plants belonging to the family Rubiaceae.

Its native range is Ethiopia to Northern Kenya.

== Species ==
Species:

- Pentanopsis fragrans Rendle
- Pentanopsis gracilicaulis (Verdc.) Thulin & B.Bremer
