= Thamnoldenlandia =

Scientific classification
- Kingdom: Plantae
- Clade: Tracheophytes
- Clade: Angiosperms
- Clade: Eudicots
- Clade: Asterids
- Order: Gentianales
- Family: Rubiaceae
- Genus: Thamnoldenlandia; Groeninckx
- Species: T. ambovombensis

Binomial name
- Thamnoldenlandia ambovombensis Groeninckx

Genus of plants

Thamnoldenlandia is a genus of plants in the Rubiaceae. It contains only one known species, Thamnoldenlandia ambovombensis, endemic to Madagascar.
