= Hydrophylax =

Scientific classification
- Kingdom: Plantae
- Clade: Tracheophytes
- Clade: Angiosperms
- Clade: Eudicots
- Clade: Asterids
- Order: Gentianales
- Family: Rubiaceae
- Subfamily: Rubioideae
- Tribe: Spermacoceae
- Genus: Hydrophylax; L.f.
- Species: H. maritima

Binomial name
- Hydrophylax maritima L.f.

Synonyms
- Sarissus Gaertn.

Genus of plants

Hydrophylax is a monotypic genus of flowering plants in the family Rubiaceae. It was described by Carl Linnaeus the Younger in 1782. The genus contains only one species, Hydrophylax maritima, which is found in India, Sri Lanka and Thailand.
