= Astiella =

Scientific classification
- Kingdom: Plantae
- Clade: Tracheophytes
- Clade: Angiosperms
- Clade: Eudicots
- Clade: Asterids
- Order: Gentianales
- Family: Rubiaceae
- Subfamily: Rubioideae
- Tribe: Spermacoceae
- Genus: Astiella; Jovet

Type species
- Astiella delicatula Jovet

Genus of plants

Astiella is a genus of flowering plants in the family Rubiaceae. It was described by Jovet (1941) as a monospecific, herbaceous genus, endemic to Madagascar. Later, 11 new species endemic to Madagascar were added to the genus.

== Species ==
- Astiella antongilensis Groeninckx
- Astiella antsalovansis Groeninckx
- Astiella confusa Groeninckx
- Astiella deblockiae Groeninckx
- Astiella delicatula Jovet
- Astiella desseinii Groeninckx
- Astiella homolleae Groeninckx
- Astiella latifolia Groeninckx
- Astiella longifimbria Groeninckx
- Astiella perrieri Groeninckx
- Astiella pulla Groeninckx
- Astiella tsaratanensis Groeninckx
