= Diadorimia =

Scientific classification
- Kingdom: Plantae
- Clade: Tracheophytes
- Clade: Angiosperms
- Clade: Eudicots
- Clade: Asterids
- Order: Gentianales
- Family: Rubiaceae
- Genus: Diadorimia; J.A.M.Carmo, Florentín & R.M.Salas (2022 publ. 2021)
- Species: D. densifolia

Binomial name
- Diadorimia densifolia (Zappi & Calió) J.A.M.Carmo, Florentín & R.M.Salas (2022 publ. 2021)

Synonyms
- Psyllocarpus densifolius Zappi & Calió (2014); Tapanhuacanga densifolia (Zappi & Calió) P.L.R.Moraes (2018)

Genus of flowering plants

Diadorimia densifolia is a species of flowering plant in the family Rubiaceae. It is the sole species in genus Diadorimia. It is a perennial or subshrub native to the Serra do Cipó of Minas Gerais state in southeastern Brazil.
