= Stephan Endlicher =

Austrian botanist and linguist

Stephan Friedrich Ladislaus Endlicher
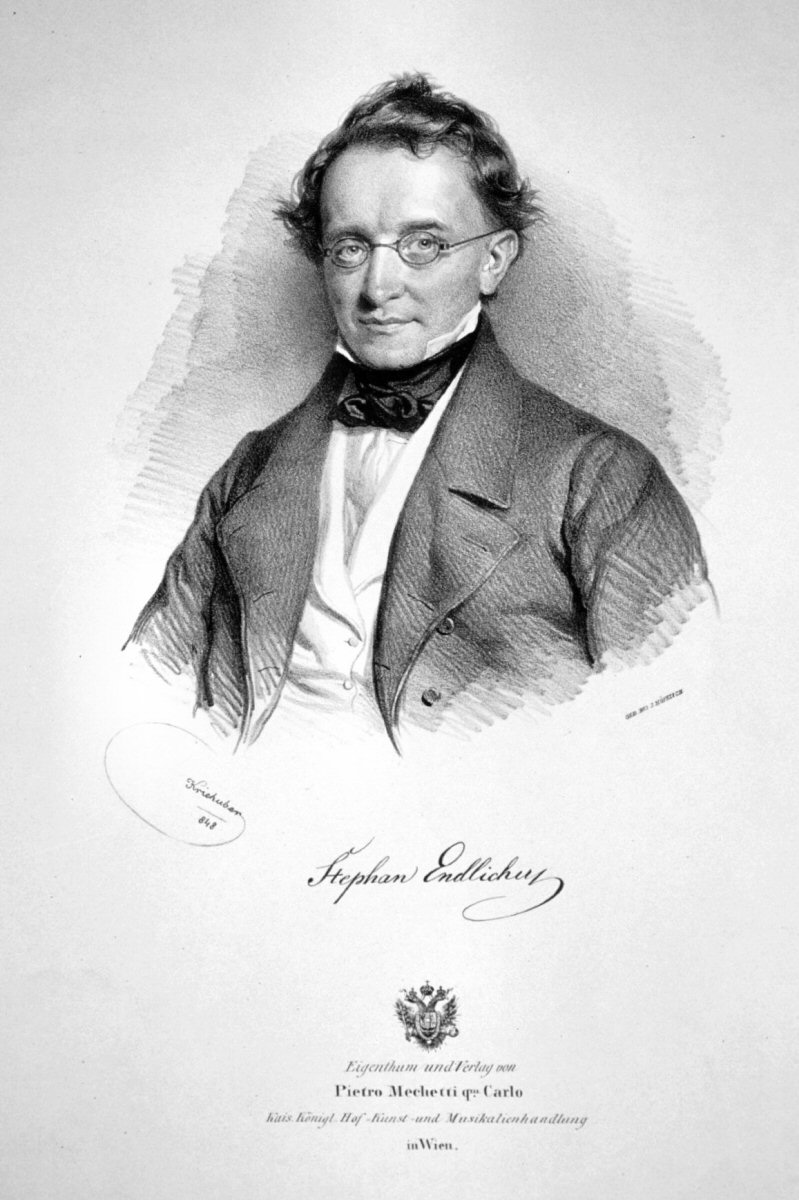
- Born: 24 June 1804; Bratislava (Pozsony), Kingdom of Hungary, Habsburg Empire
- Died: 28 March 1849 (aged 44); Vienna, Austrian Empire
- Other name: Endlicher István László
- Scientific career
- Fields: Botany
- Workplaces: Austrian National Library, University of Vienna
- Author abbrev. (botany): Endl.

Stephan Friedrich Ladislaus Endlicher, also known as Endlicher István László (24 June 1804 – 28 March 1849), was an Austrian botanist, numismatist and Sinologist. He was a director of the Botanical Garden of Vienna. The standard author abbreviation Endl. is used to indicate this person as the author when citing a botanical name.

== Biography ==
Endlicher studied theology and received minor orders. In 1828 he was appointed to the Austrian National Library to reorganize its manuscript collection. Concurrently he studied natural history, in particular botany, and East-Asian languages.

In 1836, Endlicher was appointed keeper of the court cabinet of natural history, and in 1840 he became professor at the University of Vienna and director of its Botanical Garden. He wrote a comprehensive description of the plant kingdom according to a natural system, at the time its most comprehensive description. As proposed by Endlicher, it contained images with text. It was published together with the reissue of Franz Unger's Grundzüge der Botanik (Fundamentals of Botany).

Endlicher was fundamental in establishing the Imperial Academy of Science (German: Akademie der Wissenschaften), but when contrary to his expectations the Baron Joseph Hammer von Purgstall was elected its president in his stead, he resigned. He presented his library and herbaria to the state, and passed several hours every week for 10 years in the society of the Emperor Ferdinand, but he received no other reward than the title of councillor (German: Regierungsrath).

In 1842, he was elected as a member of the American Philosophical Society.

As a known liberal, Endlicher was asked to act as mediator during the revolution of 1848, but eventually was forced to leave Vienna for a time. In 1848 he also became a member of the Frankfurt Parliament and the assembly at Kremsier (Kroměříž).

== Works ==
Endlicher made valuable contributions to the science of old German and classic literature, and pointed out new sources of Hungarian history, publishing Fragmenta Theotisca Versionis antiquissimae Evangelii Matthaei (edited with Hoffmann von Fallersleben, 1834), an edition of two poems of Priscian (1828), and Anonymi Belæ Regis Notarii de Gestis Hungarorum Liber (1827). His linguistic publications comprise Analecta Grammatica (with Eichenfeld, 1836), and Anfangsgründe der chinesischen Grammatik (Foundations of Chinese grammar; 1845).

His Verzeichniss der japanesischen und chinesischen Münzen des kaiserlichen Münz- und Antikencabinets (Catalog of Japanese and Chinese coins in the imperial coin and antique collections; 1837) and Atlas von China nach der Aufnahme der Jesuitenmissionäre (Atlas of China after the arrival of the Jesuit missionaries; 1843) are finely executed, and deserve mention as specimens of his great liberality.

He wrote several works in conjunction with other scholars, and many of his minor writings are scattered among the periodicals of his time, especially in the Annalen des Wiener Museums.

=== Botany ===
The majority and the most valuable of his works are on botany. Foremost among them are his: Genera Plantarum (1831–1841), in which he lays down a new system of classification; Grundzüge einer neuen Theorie der Pflanzenerzeugung (Foundations of a new theory of plant breeding; 1838); and Die Medicinalpflanzen der österreichischen Pharmakopöe (Medicinal plants in the Austrian pharmacopoeia; 1842).

His other principal botanical works are: Ceratotheca (1822), Flora Posoniensis (1830), Diesingia (1832), Atacta Botanica (1833), Iconographia Generum Plantarum (1838), Enchiridion Botanikum (1841) and Synopsis Coniferarum (1847).

Endlicher established the botanical journal Annalen des Wiener Museums der Naturgeschichte (1835 and on). He began the work Flora Brasiliensis with Carl Friedrich Philipp von Martius. He also published early works on the flora of Australia, including the plants collected by Carl von Hugel and Ferdinand Bauer.

Endlicher described many new plant genera, including the genus Sequoia, and also its only extant species Sequoia sempervirens (California coast redwood). Although Endlicher never offered an explanation for the name, later writers speculated that he must have been inspired by the achievements of the American Cherokee Indian linguist Sequoyah. John Davis credited Endlicher with naming the new species of Sierra redwood Sequoyah gigantea in 1847, the present day Sequoiadendron giganteum (California giant redwood), to honor Sequoyah's invention of the Cherokee syllabary. Recent scholarship supports this hypothesis; Endlicher appears to have combined the Latin sequi (meaning to follow) with his admiration of Sequoyah and coined "Sequoia" because the number of seeds per cone in the newly classified genus fell in mathematical sequence with the other four genera in the suborder.

==== Endlicher System ====
Endlicher's system for plant classification is laid out as follows in his Genera Plantarum, with a hierarchy of Regio, Sectio, Cohors, Classis, Ordo, with further subdivisions (and finally Genus), using a sequential numbering system, as shown for some taxa;

Outline

- Thallophyta
  - Protophyta
  - Hysterophyta
- Cormophyta
  - Acrobrya
  - Amphibrya
  - Acramphibrya

Conspectus

- Regio I. THALLOPHYTA
  - Sectio I. Protophyta
    - Classis I. Algae
      - Ordo I. Diatomaceae
        - I. Diatomeae
          - a. Frustulieae (Gen. 1–12)
          - b. Hydrolineae (Gen. 13–18)
        - II. Dermidieae
          - a. Micrasterieae (Gen. 19–21)
          - b. Echinelleae (Gen. 22–24)
      - Ordo II. Nostochinae
      - Ordo III. Confervaceae
      - Ordo IV. Characeae
      - Ordo V. Ulvaceae
      - Ordo VI. Floridae
      - Ordo VII. Fucaceae
    - Classis II. Lichenes
  - Sectio II. Hysterophyta
    - Classis III. Fungi
- Regio II. CORMOPHYTA
  - Sectio III. Acrobrya
    - Cohors I. Anophyta
      - Classis IV. Hepitacea
      - Classis V. Musci
    - Cohors II. Protophyta
      - Classis VI. Equiseta
      - Classis VII. Filices
      - Classis VIII. Hydropterides
      - Classis IX. Selagines
      - Classis X. Zamiae
    - Cohors II. Hysterophyta
      - Classis XI. Rhizanthaea
  - Sectio IV. Amphibrya
    - Classis 12. Glumaceae
    - Classis 13. Enantioblastae
    - Classis 14. Helobiae
    - Classis 15. Coronariae
      - Ordo 51. Juncaceae
      - Ordo 52. Philydreae
      - Ordo 53. Melanthaceae
      - Ordo 54. Pontederaceae
      - Ordo 55. Liliaceae
      - Ordo 56. Smilaceae
      - Ordo 57. Dioscoreae
      - Ordo 58. Taccaceae
    - Classis 16. Artorhizae
    - Classis 17. Ensatae
    - Classis 18. Gynandrae
    - Classis 19. Scitamineae
    - Classis 20. Fluviales
    - Classis 21. Spadiciflorae
    - Classis 22. Principes.
  - Sectio IV. Acramphibrya
    - Cohors I. Gymnosperma
      - Classis 23. Coniferae
    - Cohors II. Apetalae
      - Classis 24. Piperitae
      - Aquaticae
      - Juliflorae
      - Oleraceae
      - Thymeleae
      - Classis 29. Serpentariae
    - Cohors III. Gamopetala
      - Plumbagines
      - Classis 32. Campanulinae
      - Contortae
      - Tubiflorae
      - Classis 31. Aggregatae
      - Caprifolia
      - Kuculiferae
      - Personatae
      - Petalantheae
      - Classis 39. Bicornes
    - Cohors IV. Dialypetala
      - Classis 40. Discanthae
      - Classis 41. Corniculatae
      - Polycarpicae
      - Rhoeades
      - Nelumbea
      - Parietales
      - Peponiferae
      - Opuntiae
      - Caryophyllinae
      - Classis 49. Columniferae
      - Guttiferae
      - Hesperides
      - Acera
      - Classis 54. Polygalinae
      - Frangulaceae
      - Tricoccae
      - Terebinthinae
      - Gruinales
      - Classis 59. Calycifiorae
      - Myrtiflorae
      - Rosiflorae
      - Classis 62. Leguminosae

== Important works ==
- Flora Brasiliensis
- Genera Plantarum Secundum Ordines Naturales Disposita (1836–50)
- Synopsis Coniferarum (1847); often shortened as "Syn. Conif."
- Die Medicinal-Pflanzen der österreichischen Pharmakopöe: ein Handbuch für Ärzte und Apotheker. Gerold, Wien 1842
- Enumeratio plantarum quas in Novae Hollandiae ora austro-occidentali ad fluvium Cygnorum et in sinu Regis Georgii collegit Carolus Liber Baro de Hügel
- Prodromus Florae Norfolkicae (Flora of Norfolk Island), available online at Project Gutenberg ebooks
- Stirplum Australisicum

== Tribute ==
The genus Endlicheria of the family Lauraceae and the genus Endlichera of the family Rubiaceae (now synonym of Emmeorhiza) were named in his honour. Both plant genera occur in Tropical America.

The African fish Polypterus endlicherii Heckel, 1847 was named in honor of Endlicher, who apparently discovered the species in the fish collection at the Naturhistorisches Museum (Vienna).

== See also ==
- Category:Taxa named by Stephan Endlicher
