= Christian Ferdinand Friedrich Hochstetter =

German botanist (1787–1860)

Christian Ferdinand Friedrich Hochstetter (16 February 1787 – 20 February 1860) was a German botanist and Protestant minister.

== Biography ==
Hochstetter was born in Stuttgart in Baden-Württemberg. He was the father of geologist Ferdinand von Hochstetter (1829–1884).

In 1807, Hochstetter received his degree of Master of Divinity in Tübingen. While still a student, he became a member of a secret organization headed by Carl Ludwig Reichenbach (1788–1869) that had designs on establishing a colony on Tahiti (Otaheiti-Gesellschaft). In 1808, the organization was discovered by authorities, and its members suspected of treason and arrested. Hochstetter was imprisoned for a short period of time for his small role in the secret society. Later on, he spent six months as a teacher in a private institution in Erlangen, and afterwards was a tutor for four years in the house of the Minister of Altenstein in Thuringia.

In 1816, he became a pastor and school inspector in Brno, moving to Esslingen am Neckar in 1824. Here, he worked as an instructor at the seminary school, becoming a pastor in 1829. At Esslingen, together with Ernst Gottlieb von Steudel (1783–1856), he organised Unio Itineraria (Württembergischer botanische Reiseverein). The scientific society raised funds through subscribers for the collection and distribution of plant specimens and sold specimens to private collectors, museums and dealers in other European cities. The fourteen exsiccata-like series with the title Unio itineraria are listed and described with bibliographic data in IndExs – Index of Exsiccatae.

Hochstetter published numerous works on botany, mineralogy and natural history as well as on theology and education. With Steudel, he published Enumeratio plantarum Germaniae Helvetiaeque indigenarum, a book covering botanical species of Germany and Switzerland and with Moritz August Seubert (1818–1878), he published Flora Azorica, a treatise on the flora of the Azores.

== Legacy ==
The botanical genus Hochstetteria of the family Asteraceae is named after him. This botanist is denoted by the author abbreviation Hochst. when citing a botanical name. He is the taxonomic author or co-author of numerous botanical genera and species.

== Note ==
- This article incorporates translated text from an equivalent article at the German Wikipedia.
