= Cornelis Eliza Bertus Bremekamp =

Dutch botanist

Cornelis Eliza Bertus Bremekamp (7 February 1888 in Dordrecht – 21 December 1984) was a Dutch botanist.

He received his education at the University of Utrecht, and performed as a botanical researcher in Indonesia and South Africa. In South Africa he collaborated with German botanist Herold Georg Wilhelm Johannes Schweickerdt (1903–1977).

From 1924 to 1931 he was a professor at Transvaal University in Pretoria, where he conducted studies of the genus Pavetta. During this time period he collected plants from northern Transvaal, Rhodesia, and Mozambique. A portion of his career was spent at the herbarium in Utrecht, where he specialized in studies of Rubiaceae and Acanthaceae.

Bremekamp was elected a member of the Royal Netherlands Academy of Arts and Sciences in 1949.

Eponymy

Bremekampia (Acanthaceae)

Batopedina (Rubiaceae)

Toddaliopsis bremekampii (Rutaceae)

== Written works ==
- "A revision of the South African species of Pavetta", 1929
- Sciaphyllum, genus novum Acanthacearum, 1940
- "Materials for a monograph of the Strobilanthinae (Acanthaceae)", 1944
- "Notes on the Acanthaceae of Java", 1948
- "A preliminary survey of the Ruelliinae (Acanthaceae) of the Malay Archipelago and New Guinea", 1948
- "The African species of Oldenlandia L Sensu Hiern et K. Schumann", 1952
- "A revision of the Malaysian Nelsonieae (Scrophulariaceae)", 1955
- "The Thunbergia species of the Malesian area", 1955.
- "Remarks on the position, the delimitation and the subdivision of the Rubiaceae", 1966.
