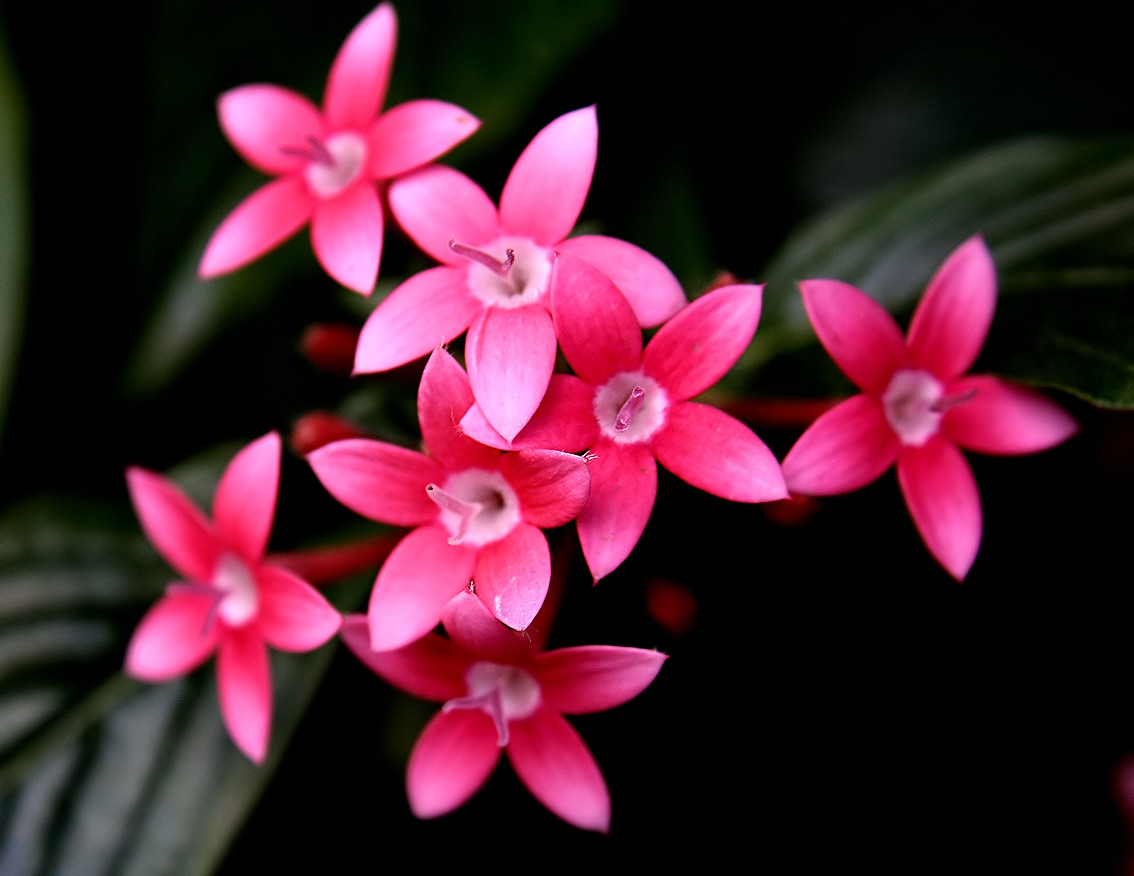
- Pentas sp.

Scientific classification
- Kingdom: Plantae
- Clade: Tracheophytes
- Clade: Angiosperms
- Clade: Eudicots
- Clade: Asterids
- Order: Gentianales
- Family: Rubiaceae
- Subfamily: Rubioideae
- Tribe: Knoxieae; Hook.f.

Type genus
- Knoxia L.

Synonyms
- Knoxiinae K.Schum.; Knoxioideae Luerss.

= Knoxieae =

Tribe of plants

Knoxieae is a tribe of flowering plants in the family Rubiaceae and contains about 131 species in 16 genera. Its representatives are found in Tropical and Southern Africa, the islands in the Western Indian Ocean, the Arabian Peninsula, Tropical and Subtropical Asia, and Northern Australia.

== Genera ==
Currently accepted names

- Batopedina Verdc. (3 sp)
- Carphalea Juss. (3 sp)
- Chamaepentas Bremek. (6 sp)
- Dirichletia Klotzsch (5 sp)
- Dolichopentas Kårehed & B.Bremer (4 sp)
- Knoxia L. (13 sp)
- Otiophora Zucc. (18 sp)
- Otomeria Benth. (8 sp)
- Paracarphalea Razafimandimbison, Ferm, B.Bremer & Kårehed (3 sp)
- Paraknoxia Bremek. (1 sp)
- Parapentas Bremek. (3 sp)
- Pentanisia Harv. (19 sp)
- Pentas Benth. (16 sp)
- Phyllopentas (Verdc.) Kårehed & B.Bremer (14 sp)
- Rhodopentas Kårehed & B.Bremer (2 sp)
- Triainolepis Hook.f. (13 sp)

Synonyms

- Afroknoxia Verdc. = Knoxia
- Baumannia K.Schum. = Knoxia
- Calanda K.Schum. = Pentanisia
- Chlorochorion Puff & Robbr. = Pentanisia
- Cuncea Buch.-Ham. ex D.Don = Knoxia
- Dentillaria Kuntze = Knoxia
- Diotocarpus Hochst. = Pentanisia
- Holocarpa Baker = Pentanisia
- Mericocalyx Bamps = Otiophora
- Neobaumannia Hutch. & Dalziel = Knoxia
- Neopentanisia Verdc. = Pentanisia
- Neurocarpaea R.Br. ex Hiern = Pentas
- Neurocarpaea R.Br. = Pentas
- Orthostemma Wall. ex Voigt = Pentas
- Otocephalus Chiov. = Pentanisia
- Paratriaina Bremek. = Triainolepis
- Pentacarpaea Hiern = Pentanisia
- Pentacarpus Post & Kuntze = Pentanisia
- Placopoda Balf.f. = Dirichletia
- Princea Dubard & Dop = Triainolepis
- Tapinopentas Bremek. = Otomeria
- Thyridocalyx Bremek. = Triainolepis
- Vignaldia A.Rich. = Pentas
- Vissadali Adans. = Knoxia
