= Dolichopentas =

Scientific classification
- Kingdom: Plantae
- Clade: Tracheophytes
- Clade: Angiosperms
- Clade: Eudicots
- Clade: Asterids
- Order: Gentianales
- Family: Rubiaceae
- Subfamily: Rubioideae
- Tribe: Knoxieae
- Genus: Dolichopentas; Kårehed & B.Bremer

Genus of plants

Dolichopentas is a genus of flowering plants in the family Rubiaceae. The genus is found in tropical Africa.

== Species ==
- Dolichopentas decora (S.Moore) Kårehed & B.Bremer
  - Dolichopentas decora var. decora
  - Dolichopentas decora var. lasiocarpa (Verdc.) Kårehed & B.Bremer
  - Dolichopentas decora var. triangularis (De Wild.) Kårehed & B.Bremer
- Dolichopentas liebrechtsiana (De Wild.) Kårehed & B.Bremer
- Dolichopentas lindenioides (S.Moore) Kårehed & B.Bremer
- Dolichopentas longiflora (Oliv.) Kårehed & B.Bremer
