= Chamaepentas =

Scientific classification
- Kingdom: Plantae
- Clade: Tracheophytes
- Clade: Angiosperms
- Clade: Eudicots
- Clade: Asterids
- Order: Gentianales
- Family: Rubiaceae
- Subfamily: Rubioideae
- Tribe: Knoxieae
- Genus: Chamaepentas; Bremek.

Type species
- Chamaepentas greenwayi Bremek.

Genus of flowering plants

Chamaepentas is a genus of flowering plants in the family Rubiaceae. It is native to tropical Africa.

== Species ==
- Chamaepentas graniticola (E.A.Bruce) Kårehed & B.Bremer - Tanzania
- Chamaepentas greenwayi Bremek. - Tanzania
- Chamaepentas hindsioides (K.Schum.) Kårehed & B.Bremer - Tanzania, Kenya
  - Chamaepentas hindsioides var. glabrescens (Verdc.) Kårehed & B.Bremer - Tanzania, Kenya
  - Chamaepentas hindsioides var. hindsioides - Tanzania, Kenya
  - Chamaepentas hindsioides var. parensis (Verdc.) Kårehed & B.Bremer - Tanzania
  - Chamaepentas hindsioides var. williamsii (Verdc.) Kårehed & B.Bremer - Tanzania
- Chamaepentas longituba (K.Schum.) Kårehed & B.Bremer - Tanzania
- Chamaepentas nobilis (S.Moore) Kårehed & B.Bremer - Tanzania, Zimbabwe, Zambia, Democratic Republic of the Congo
- Chamaepentas pseudomagnifica (M.Taylor) Kårehed & B.Bremer - Kenya, Malawi, Tanzania
