= Phyllopentas =

Scientific classification
- Kingdom: Plantae
- Clade: Tracheophytes
- Clade: Angiosperms
- Clade: Eudicots
- Clade: Asterids
- Order: Gentianales
- Family: Rubiaceae
- Tribe: Knoxieae
- Genus: Phyllopentas (Verdc.) Kårehed & B.Bremer

Genus of plants

Phyllopentas is a genus of flowering plants belonging to the family Rubiaceae.

Its native range is Tropical Africa, Madagascar.

== Species ==
Species:

- Phyllopentas austro-orientalis (Homolle & Verdc.) Kårehed & B.Bremer
- Phyllopentas concinna (K.Schum.) Kårehed & B.Bremer
- Phyllopentas decaryana (Homolle ex Verdc.) Kårehed & B.Bremer
- Phyllopentas elata (K.Schum.) Kårehed & B.Bremer
- Phyllopentas flava Razafim., Andriamih. & Kårehed
- Phyllopentas hirtiflora (Baker) Kårehed & B.Bremer
- Phyllopentas ionolaena (K.Schum.) Kårehed & B.Bremer
- Phyllopentas ledermannii (K.Krause) Kårehed & B.Bremer
- Phyllopentas madagascariensis (Verdc.) Kårehed & B.Bremer
- Phyllopentas mussaendoides (Baker) Kårehed & B.Bremer
- Phyllopentas schimperi (Hochst.) ined.
- Phyllopentas schumanniana (K.Krause) Kårehed & B.Bremer
- Phyllopentas tenuis (Verdc.) Kårehed & B.Bremer
- Phyllopentas ulugurica (Verdc.) Kårehed & B.Bremer
