= Phyllopentas ledermannii =

Conservation status
- Vulnerable (IUCN 3.1)

Scientific classification
- Kingdom: Plantae
- Clade: Tracheophytes
- Clade: Angiosperms
- Clade: Eudicots
- Clade: Asterids
- Order: Gentianales
- Family: Rubiaceae
- Genus: Phyllopentas
- Species: P. ledermannii

Binomial name
- Phyllopentas ledermannii (K.Krause) Kårehed & B.Bremer

Synonyms
- Pentas ledermannii K.Krause; Pentas pubiflora subsp. bamendensis Verdc.

Species of plant

Phyllopentas ledermannii is a species of flowering plant in the family Rubiaceae. It is found in Cameroon and Nigeria. Its natural habitats are subtropical or tropical moist lowland forests, subtropical or tropical moist montane forests, and subtropical or tropical high-altitude grassland. It is threatened by habitat loss.
