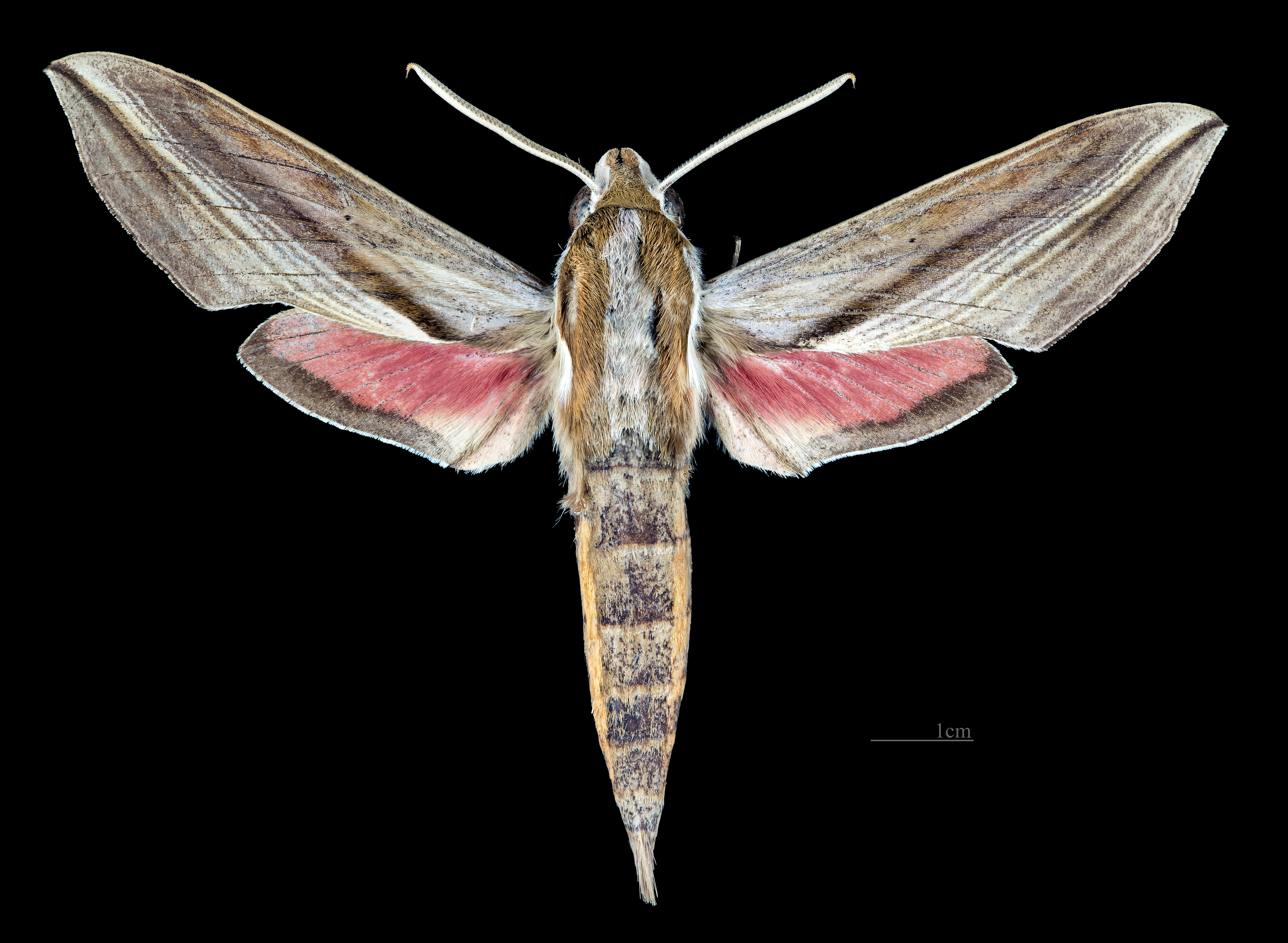
- Male dorsal view
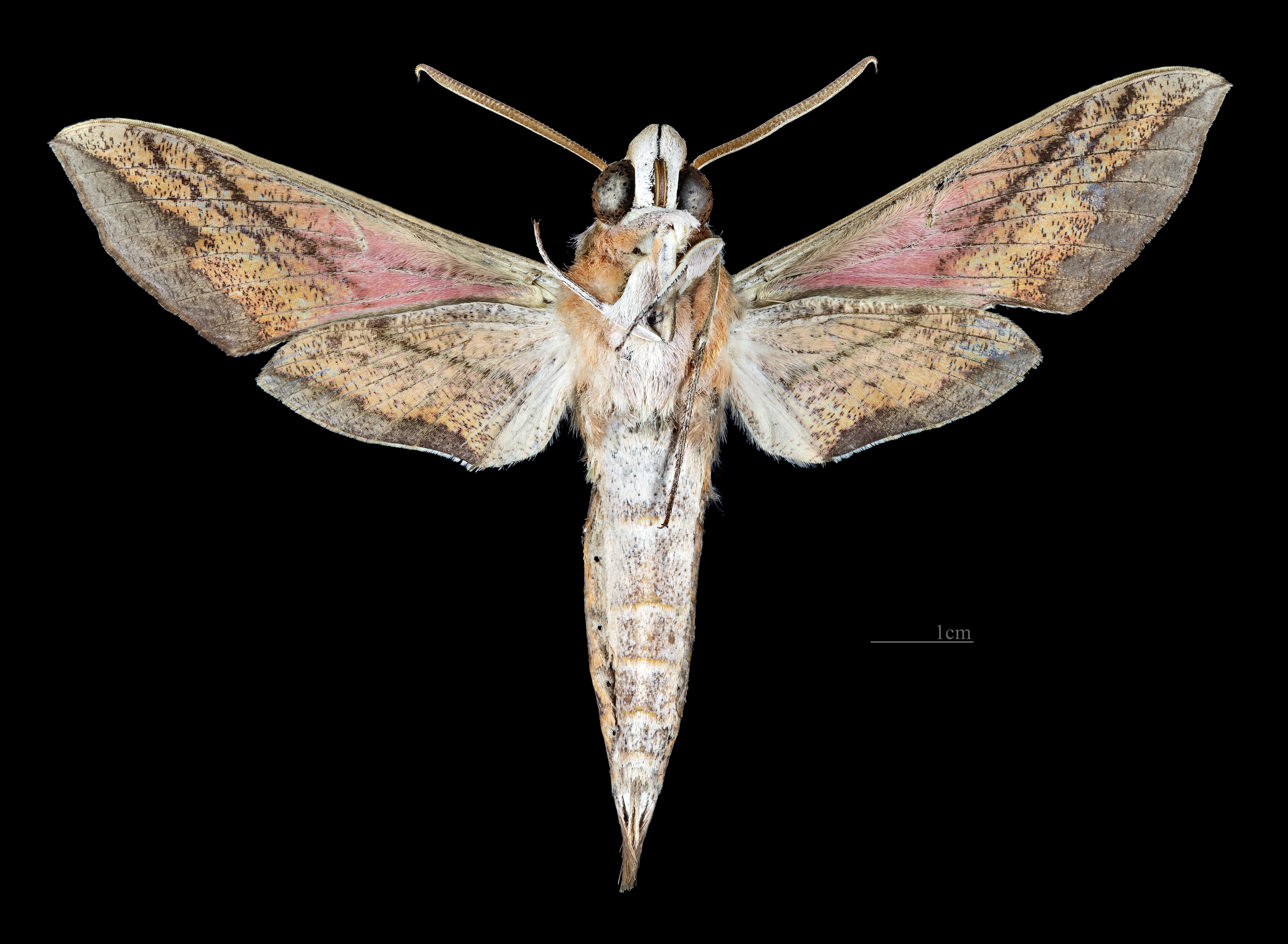
- Male ventral view

Scientific classification
- Kingdom: Animalia
- Phylum: Arthropoda
- Clade: Pancrustacea
- Class: Insecta
- Order: Lepidoptera
- Family: Sphingidae
- Genus: Hippotion
- Species: H. boerhaviae

Binomial name
- Hippotion boerhaviae (Fabricius, 1775)

Synonyms
- Sphinx boerhaviae Fabricius, 1775; Sphinx octopunctata Gmelin, 1790; Sphinx vampyrus Fabricius, 1787

= Hippotion boerhaviae =

Species of moth

Hippotion boerhaviae, the pale striated hawkmoth, is a moth of the family Sphingidae.

== Distribution ==
It is known from Sri Lanka, India, Nepal, Thailand, south-eastern China (Hong Kong and Guangdong), Vietnam, Indonesia, the Philippines, eastern Australia and New Caledonia.

== Description ==
The wingspan is 50–68 mm.

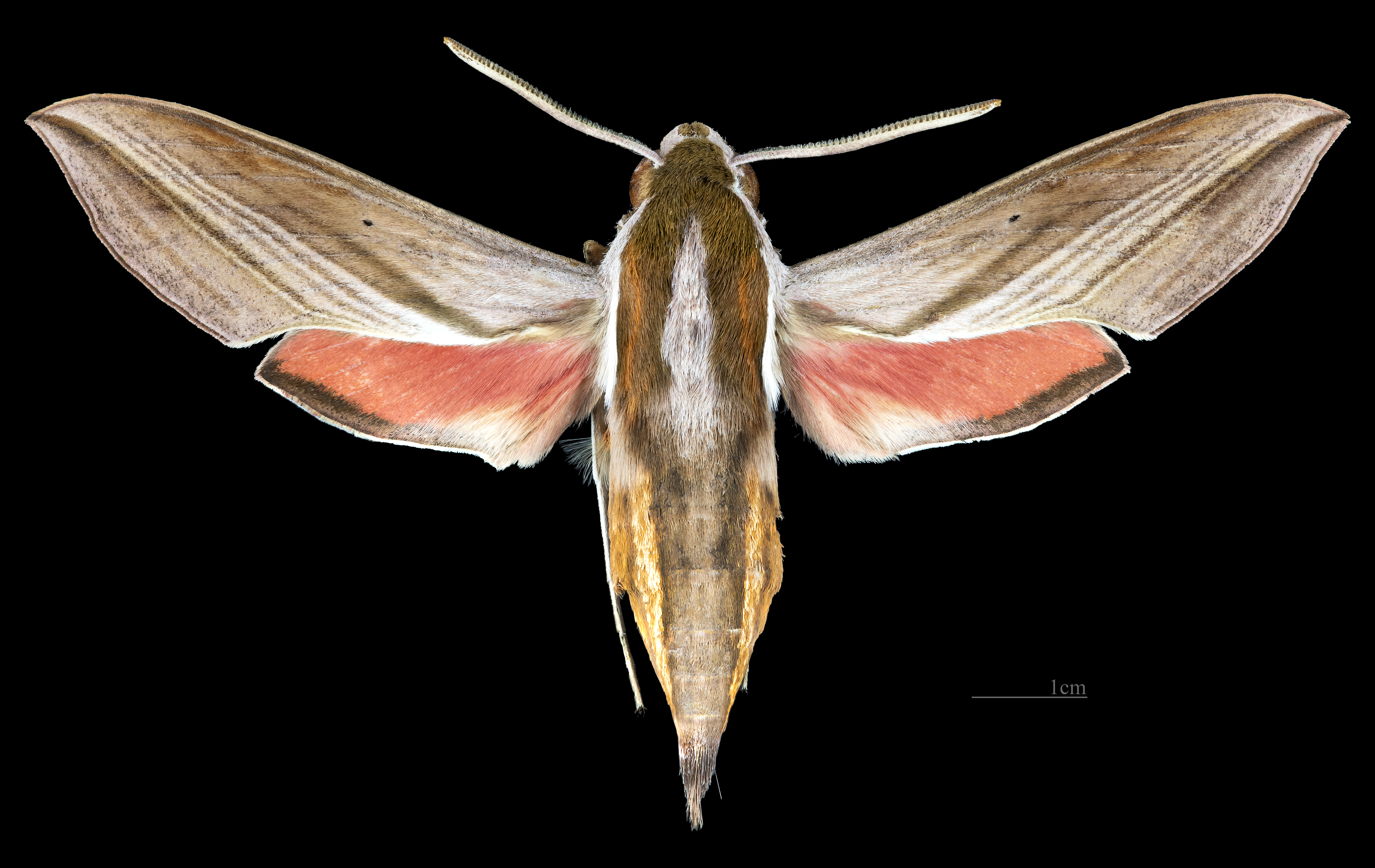
Female dorsal

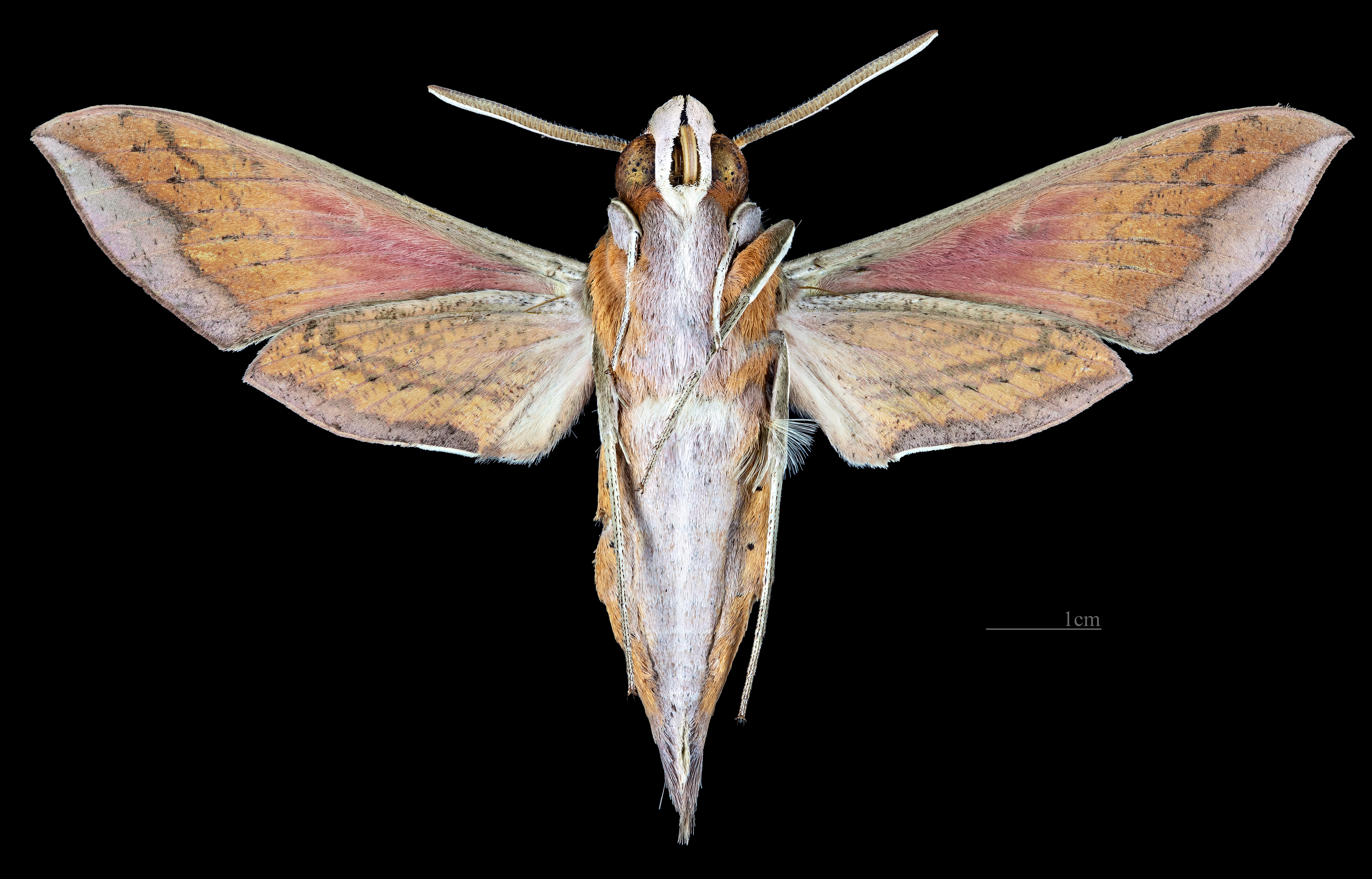
Female ventral

== Biology ==
Adults sometimes visit flowers. They may travel long distances, either voluntary or involuntary.

The larvae mainly feed on Oldenlandia and Spermacoce species. In India, they have been recorded on Impatiens species, Spermacoce stricta, Spermacoce hispida, Glossostigma spathulatum, Boerhavia repens and Boerhavia diffusa. The host plant is Pentas lanceolata in Australia.
