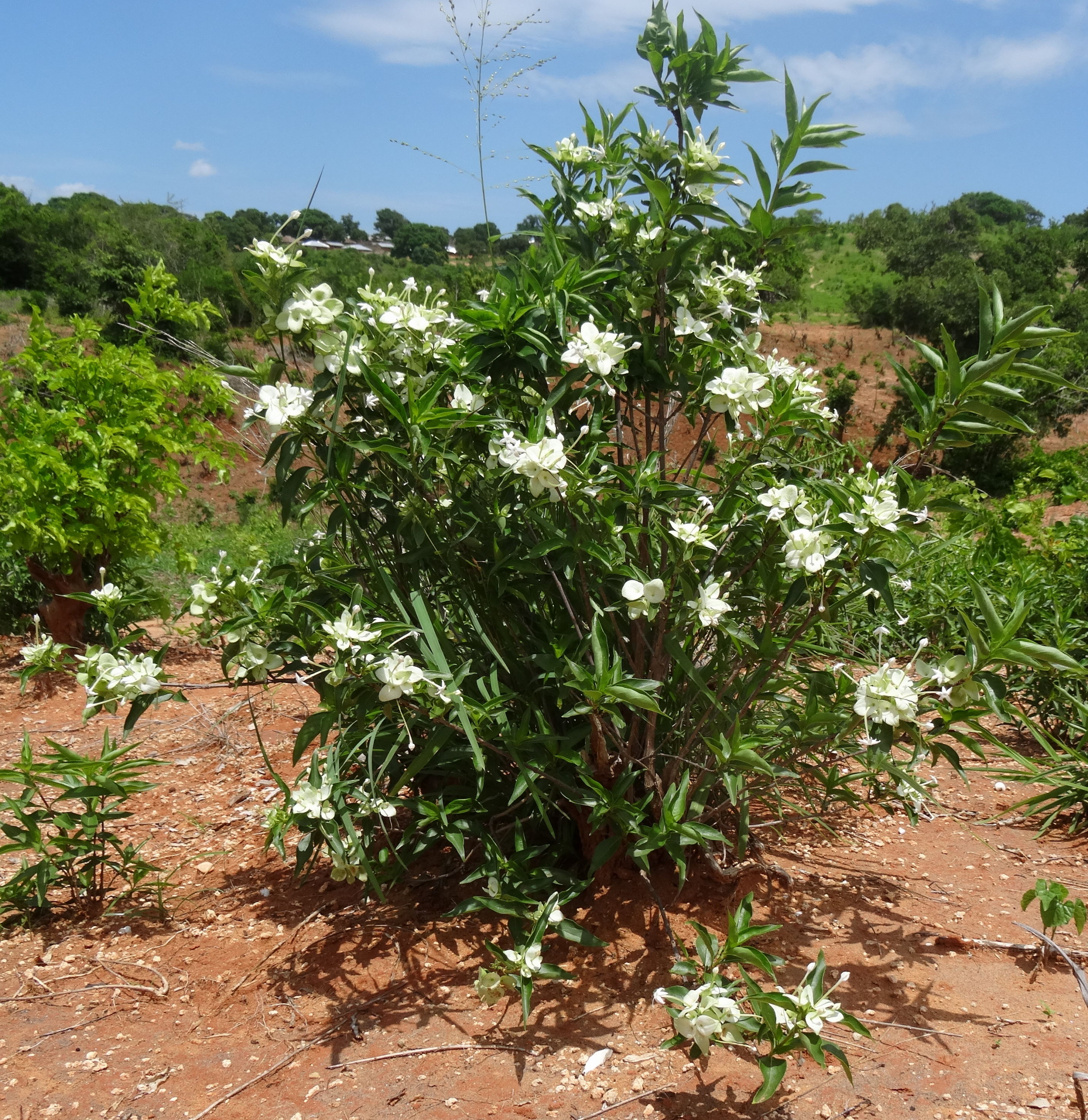
- Dirichletia pubescens (synonym Carphalea pubescens)

Scientific classification
- Kingdom: Plantae
- Clade: Tracheophytes
- Clade: Angiosperms
- Clade: Eudicots
- Clade: Asterids
- Order: Gentianales
- Family: Rubiaceae
- Subfamily: Rubioideae
- Tribe: Knoxieae
- Genus: Dirichletia; Klotzsch

Type species
- Dirichletia pubescens Klotzsch

Synonyms
- Placopoda Balf.f.

= Dirichletia =

Genus of plants

Dirichletia is a genus of flowering plants in the family Rubiaceae. The genus is found northeastern tropical Africa to Namibia.

== Species ==
- Dirichletia glaucescens Hiern - Ethiopia, Somalia, Kenya, Tanzania
- Dirichletia obovata Balf.f. - Socotra
- Dirichletia pubescens Klotzsch - Malawi, Mozambique, Zambia, Zimbabwe, Namibia
- Dirichletia somaliensis (Puff) Kårehed & B.Bremer - northeastern Somalia
- Dirichletia virgata (Balf.f.) Kårehed & B.Bremer - Socotra
