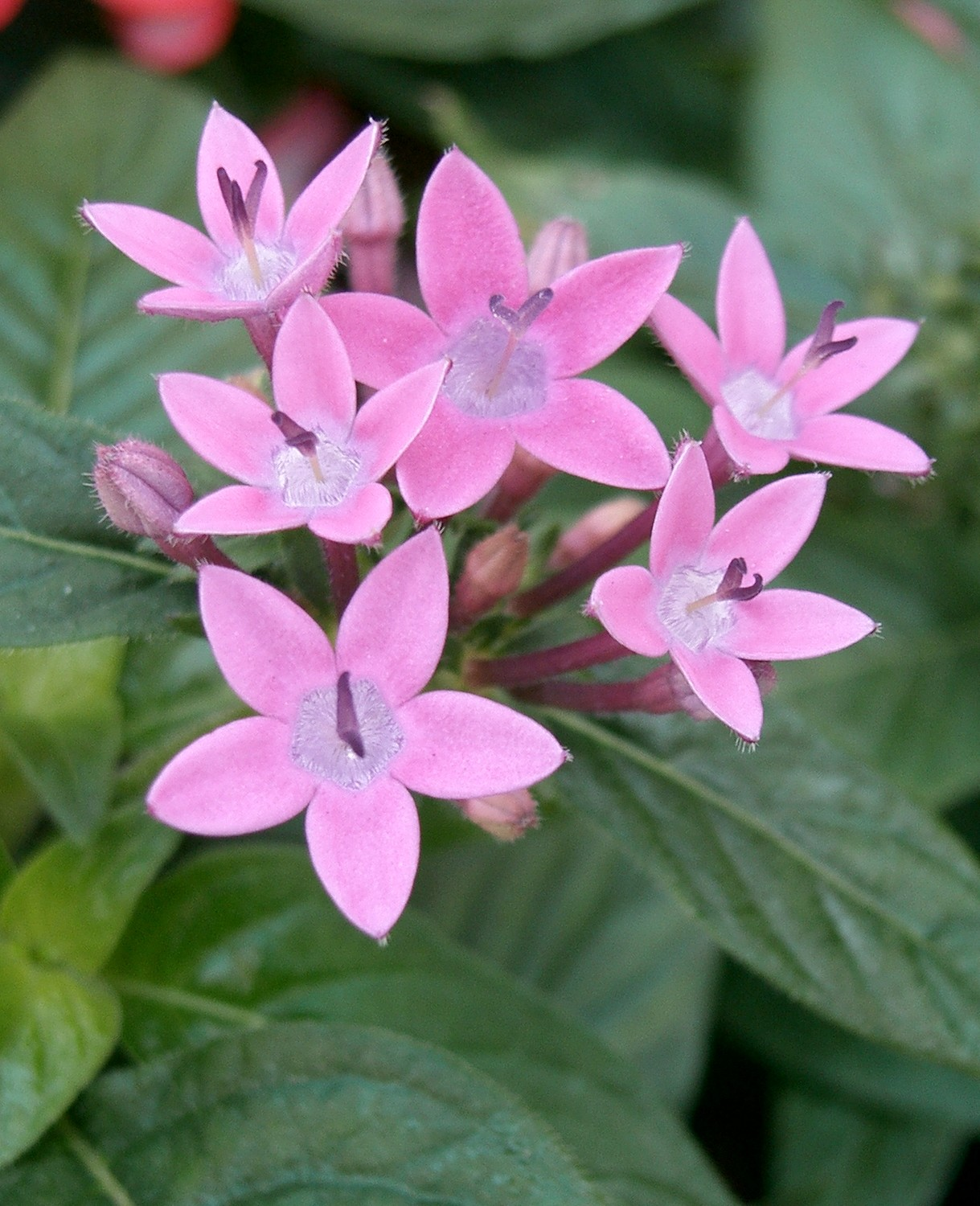
- Pentas lanceolata

Scientific classification
- Kingdom: Plantae
- Clade: Tracheophytes
- Clade: Angiosperms
- Clade: Eudicots
- Clade: Asterids
- Order: Gentianales
- Family: Rubiaceae
- Subfamily: Rubioideae
- Tribe: Knoxieae
- Genus: Pentas; Benth.

Type species
- Pentas lanceolata (Forssk.) Deflers

Synonyms
- Neurocarpaea R.Br. ex Hiern; Orthostemma Wall. ex Voigt; Vignaldia A.Rich.

= Pentas =

Genus of plants

Pentas is a genus of flowering plants in the family Rubiaceae. The genus is found in tropical and southern Africa, the Comoros, Madagascar, and the Arabian Peninsula.

The plants have hairy green leaves and clusters of flowers in shades of red, white, pink, and purple. Pentas are attractive to butterflies and hummingbirds. Some species are commonly cultivated and can be grown in pots and baskets. Species such as Pentas lanceolata can withstand full sunlight and need little to no care, growing even in locations that are dry and hot.

== Species ==
- Pentas angustifolia (A.Rich.) Verdc.
- Pentas arvensis Hiern
- Pentas caffensis Chiov.
- Pentas cleistostoma K.Schum.
- Pentas glabrescens Baker
- Pentas herbacea (Hiern) K.Schum.
- Pentas lanceolata (Forssk.) Deflers – Egyptian starcluster
- Pentas micrantha Baker
- Pentas nervosa Hepper
- Pentas pauciflora Baker
- Pentas pubiflora S.Moore
- Pentas purpurea Oliv.
- Pentas purseglovei Verdc.
- Pentas suswaensis Verdc.
- Pentas tibestica Quézel
- Pentas zanzibarica (Klotzsch) Vatke

== Image gallery ==
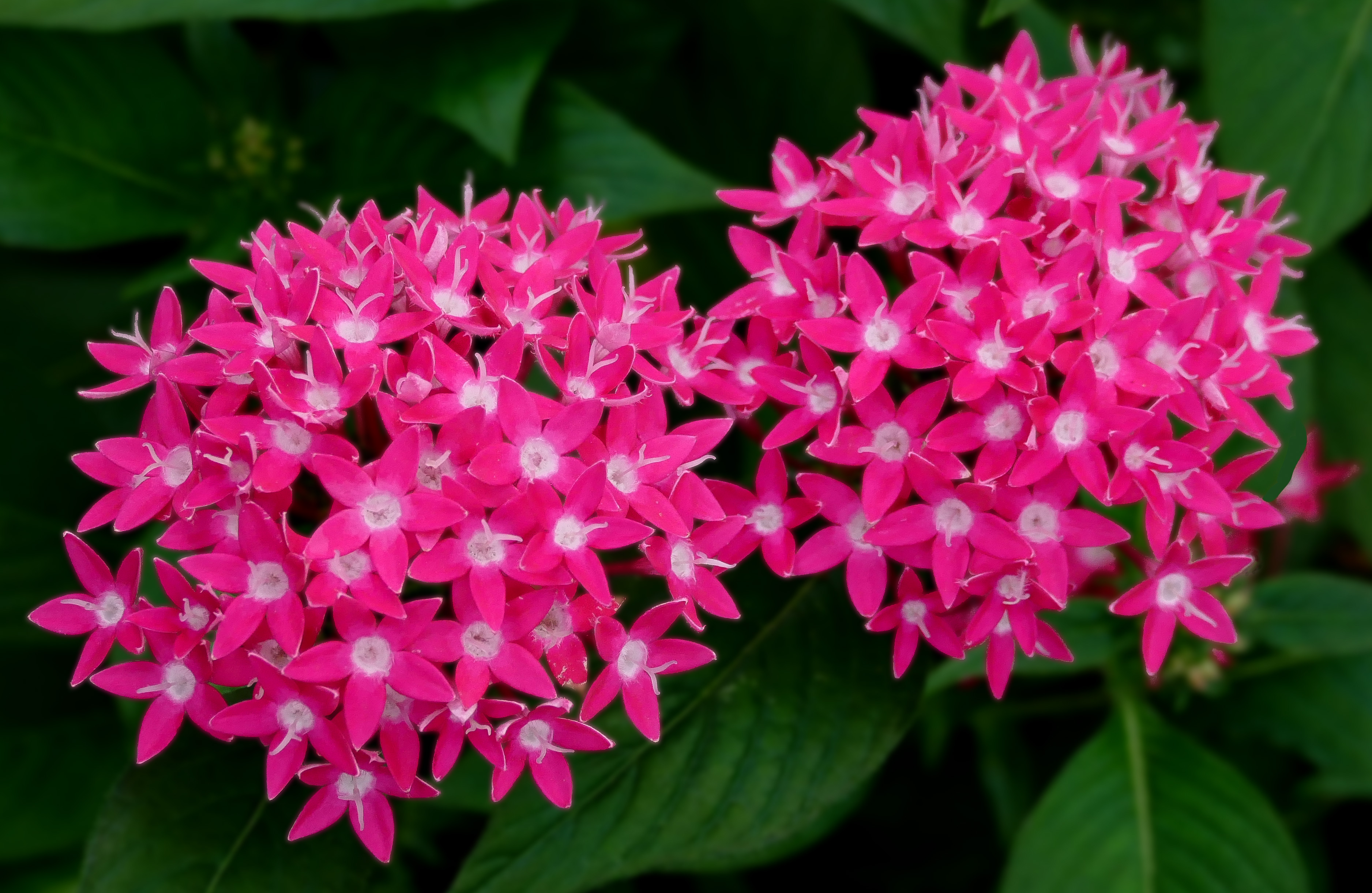
Pentas lanceolata 'Butterfly-Deep-Rose'
