= Otiophora =

Otiophora is the scientific name for two genera of organisms and may refer to:

- Otiophora (moth), a genus of moths in the family Crambidae
- Otiophora (plant), a genus of plants in the family Rubiaceae
