= Baumannia =

Baumannia can refer to:

- Candidatus Baumannia, a candidatus genus of bacteria including Ca. Baumannia cicadellinicola
- Knoxia, a genus of plant formerly known as Baumannia
