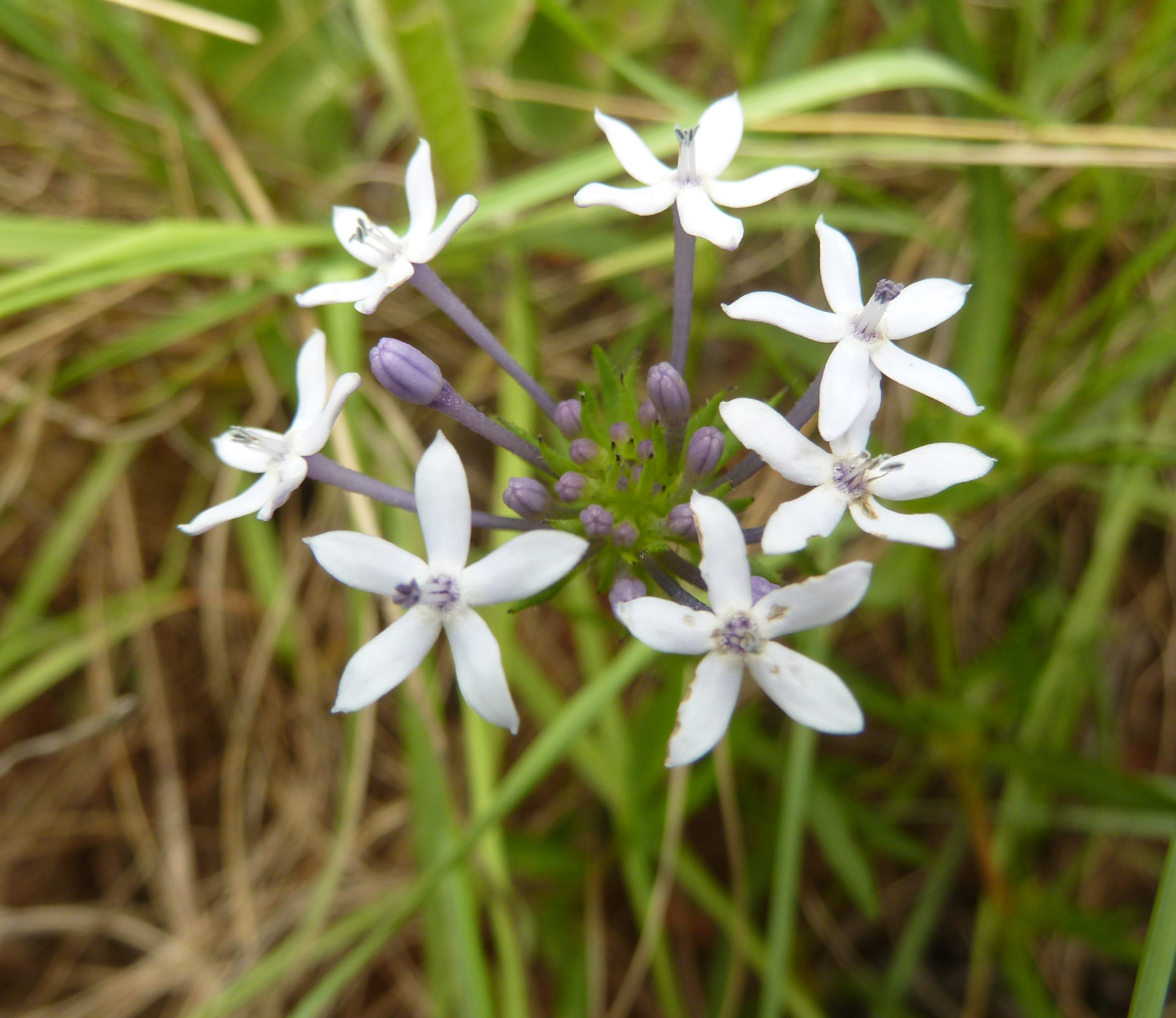
- P. angustifolia

Scientific classification
- Kingdom: Plantae
- Clade: Tracheophytes
- Clade: Angiosperms
- Clade: Eudicots
- Clade: Asterids
- Order: Gentianales
- Family: Rubiaceae
- Subfamily: Rubioideae
- Tribe: Knoxieae
- Genus: Pentanisia; Harv.

Synonyms
- Calanda K.Schum.; Chlorochorion Puff & Robbr.; Diotocarpus Hochst.; Holocarpa Baker; Neopentanisia Verdc.; Otocephalus Chiov.; Pentacarpaea Hiern; Pentacarpus Post & Kuntze

= Pentanisia =

Genus of plants

Pentanisia is a genus of flowering plants in the family Rubiaceae.

== Species ==
The genus contains about 19 species.

- Pentanisia angustifolia (Hochst.) Hochst.
- Pentanisia annua K.Schum.
- Pentanisia arenaria (Hiern) Verdc.
- Pentanisia calcicola Verdc.
- Pentanisia confertifolia (Baker) Verdc.
- Pentanisia foetida Verdc.
- Pentanisia gossweileri (Verdc.) Kårehed & B.Bremer
- Pentanisia longipedunculata Verdc.
- Pentanisia longituba (Franch.) Oliv.
- Pentanisia microphylla (Franch.) Chiov.
- Pentanisia monticola (K.Krause) Verdc.
- Pentanisia ouranogyne S.Moore
- Pentanisia procumbens R.D.Good
- Pentanisia prunelloides (Klotzsch) Walp.
- Pentanisia renifolia Verdc.
- Pentanisia rubricaulis (K.Schum.) Kårehed & B.Bremer
- Pentanisia schweinfurthii Hiern
- Pentanisia sykesii Hutch.
- Pentanisia veronicoides (Baker) K.Schum.
