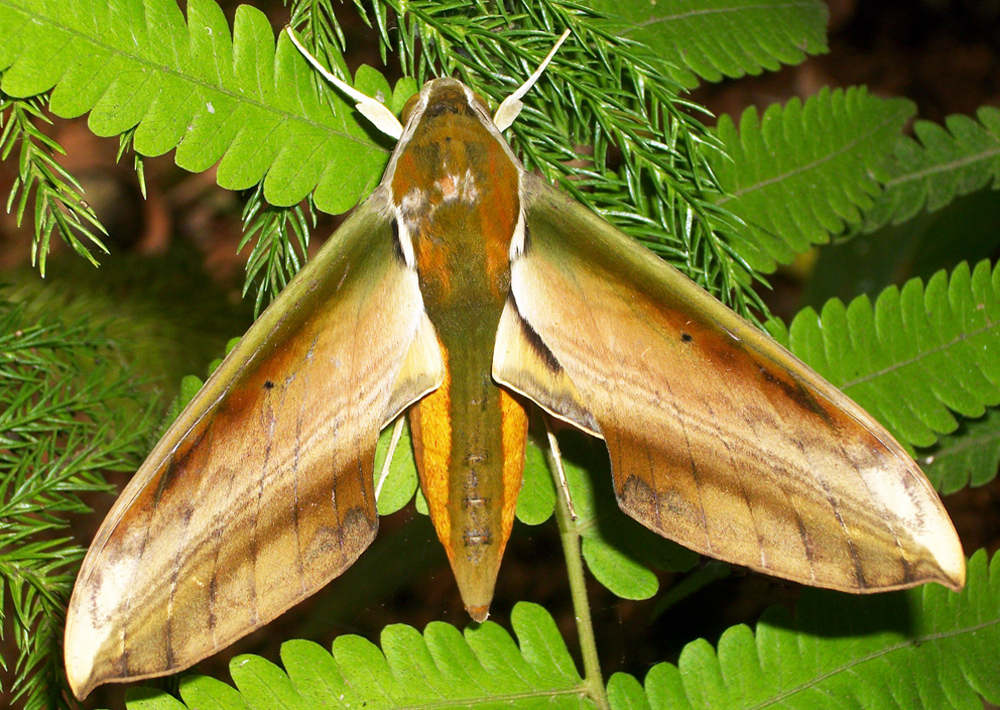
- In Mangaon, Maharashtra, India

Scientific classification
- Kingdom: Animalia
- Phylum: Arthropoda
- Clade: Pancrustacea
- Class: Insecta
- Order: Lepidoptera
- Family: Sphingidae
- Genus: Theretra
- Species: T. nessus

Binomial name
- Theretra nessus (Drury, 1773)

Synonyms
- Sphinx nessus Drury, 1773; Sphinx equestris Fabricius, 1793; Chaerocampa nessus rubicundus (Schaufuss, 1870)

= Theretra nessus =

Yam hawk moth

Species of moth

Theretra nessus, the yam hawk moth, is a moth of the family Sphingidae. It was described by Dru Drury in 1773.

== Distribution ==
It is found in Sri Lanka, India (including the Andaman and Nicobar islands), Nepal, Myanmar, Thailand, Vietnam, southern China, Taiwan, South Korea, Japan, Philippines, Malaysia, Singapore, Indonesia, northern Australia, Guam and New Caledonia. It is a recent immigrant in Oahu.

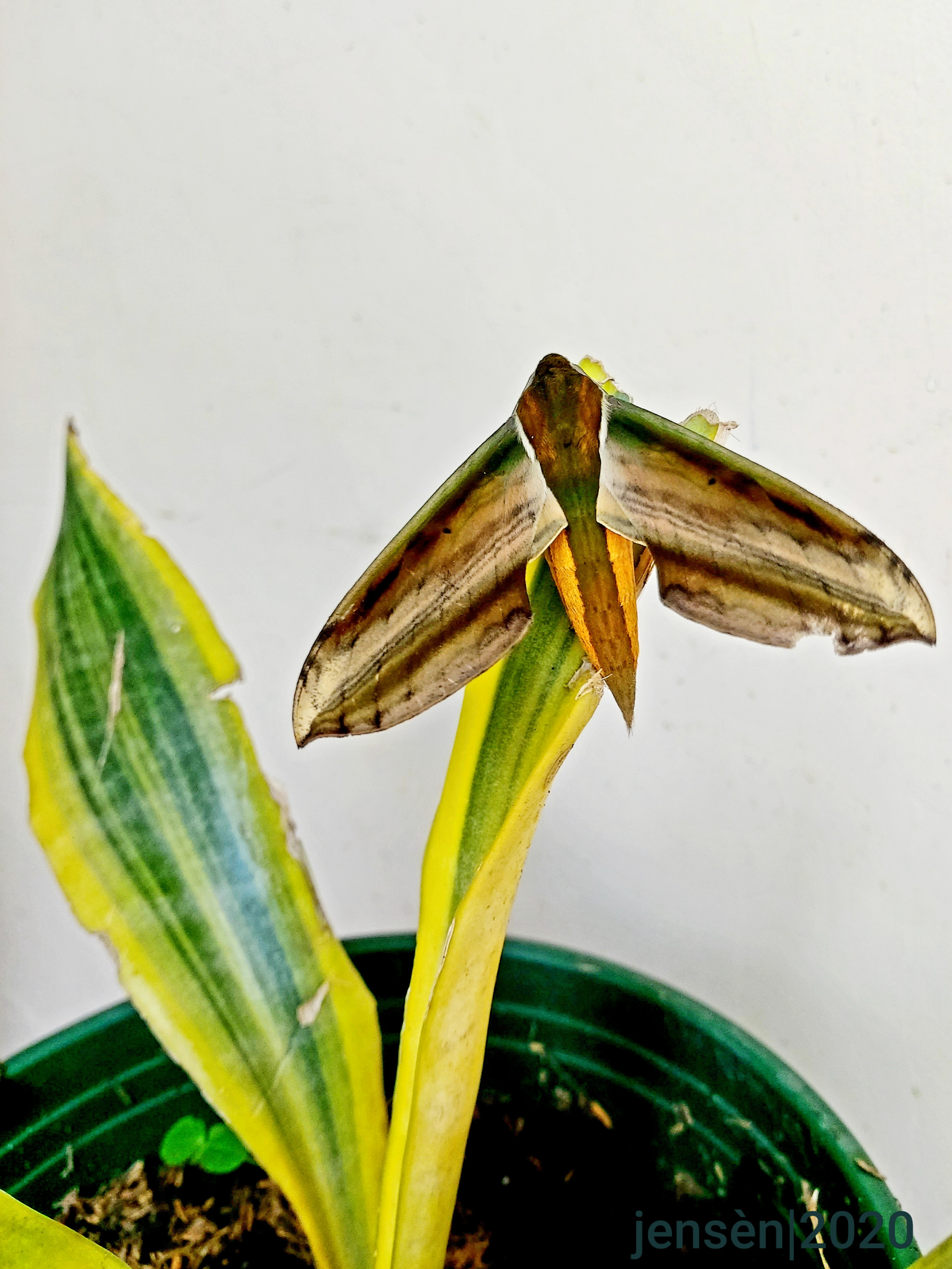
Yam Hawk-Moth

== Description ==
The wingspan is 90–130 mm. Head, thorax and a stripe down center of abdomen is green suffused with ferrugineous. Thorax is with a lateral grey stripe and abdomen is golden yellow at the sides. Forewings are olive brown and the base with a patch of black and white on the inner margin. A black dot is present at end of cell. A postmedial waved oblique line met by three straight oblique lines from the apex at inner margin. Hindwings are black brown where the anal angle is ochreous, which colour extends towards the apex as a submarginal band. Ventral side is suffused with reddish ochreous.

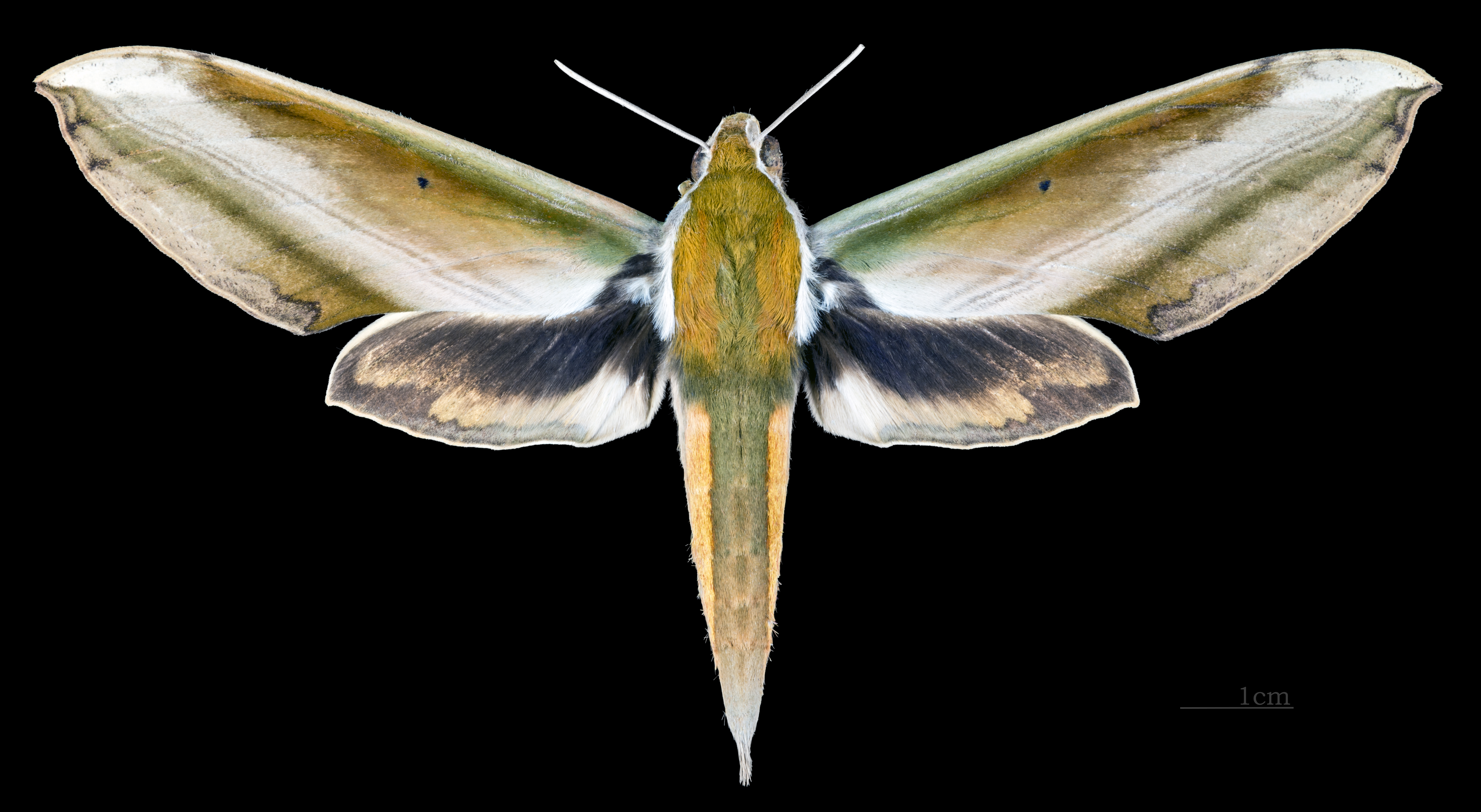
Female dorsal

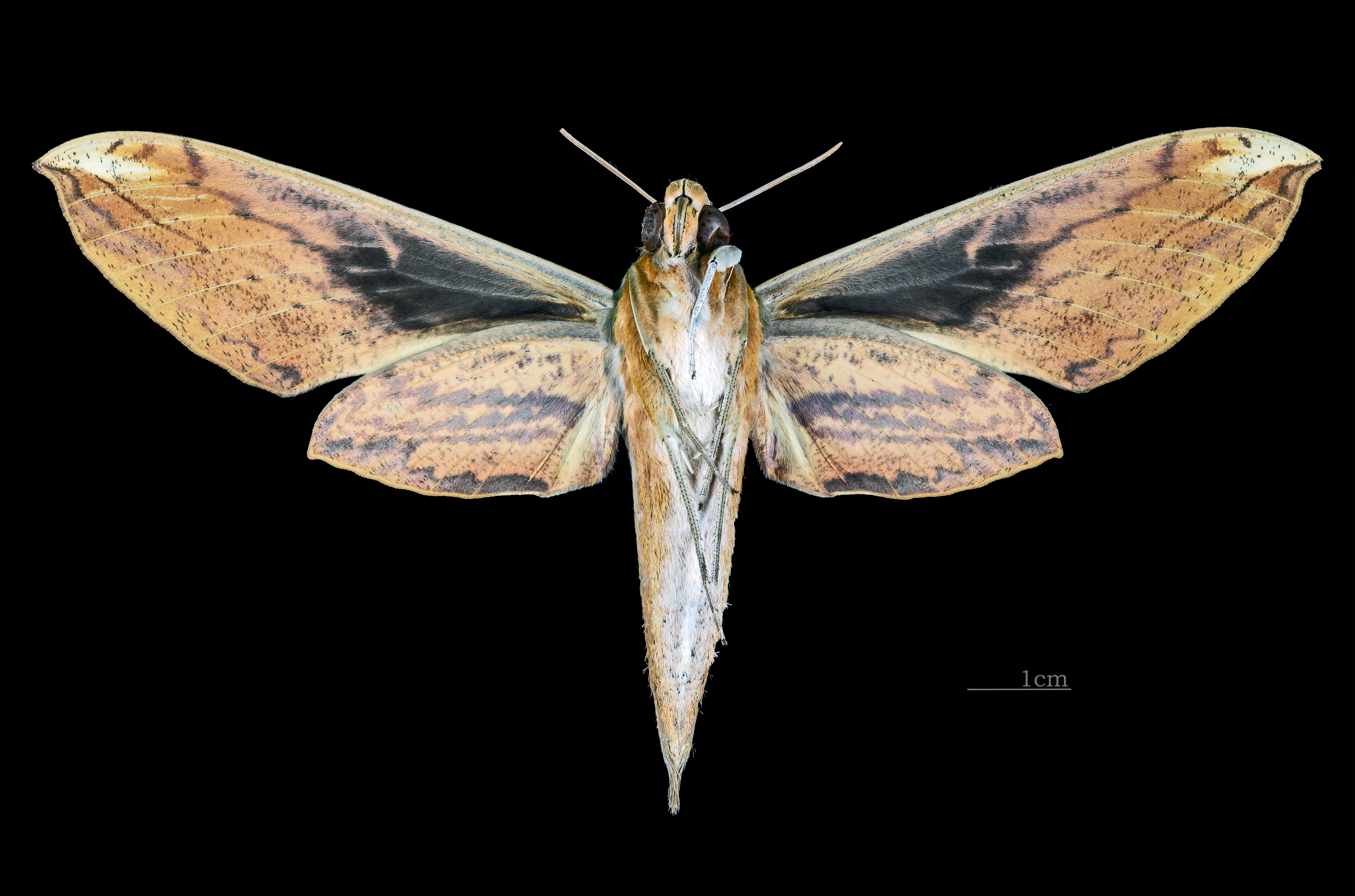
Female ventral

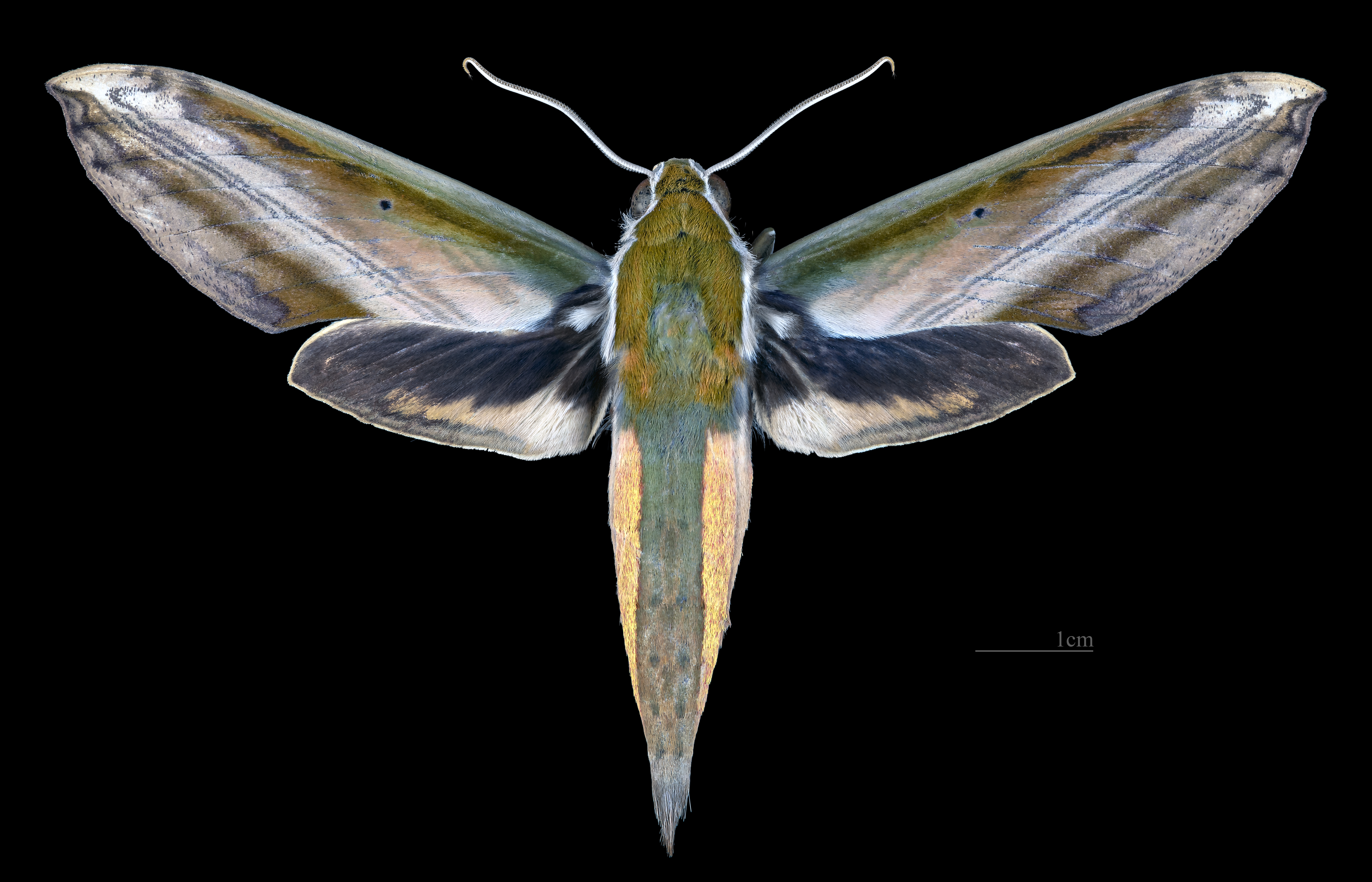
Male dorsal

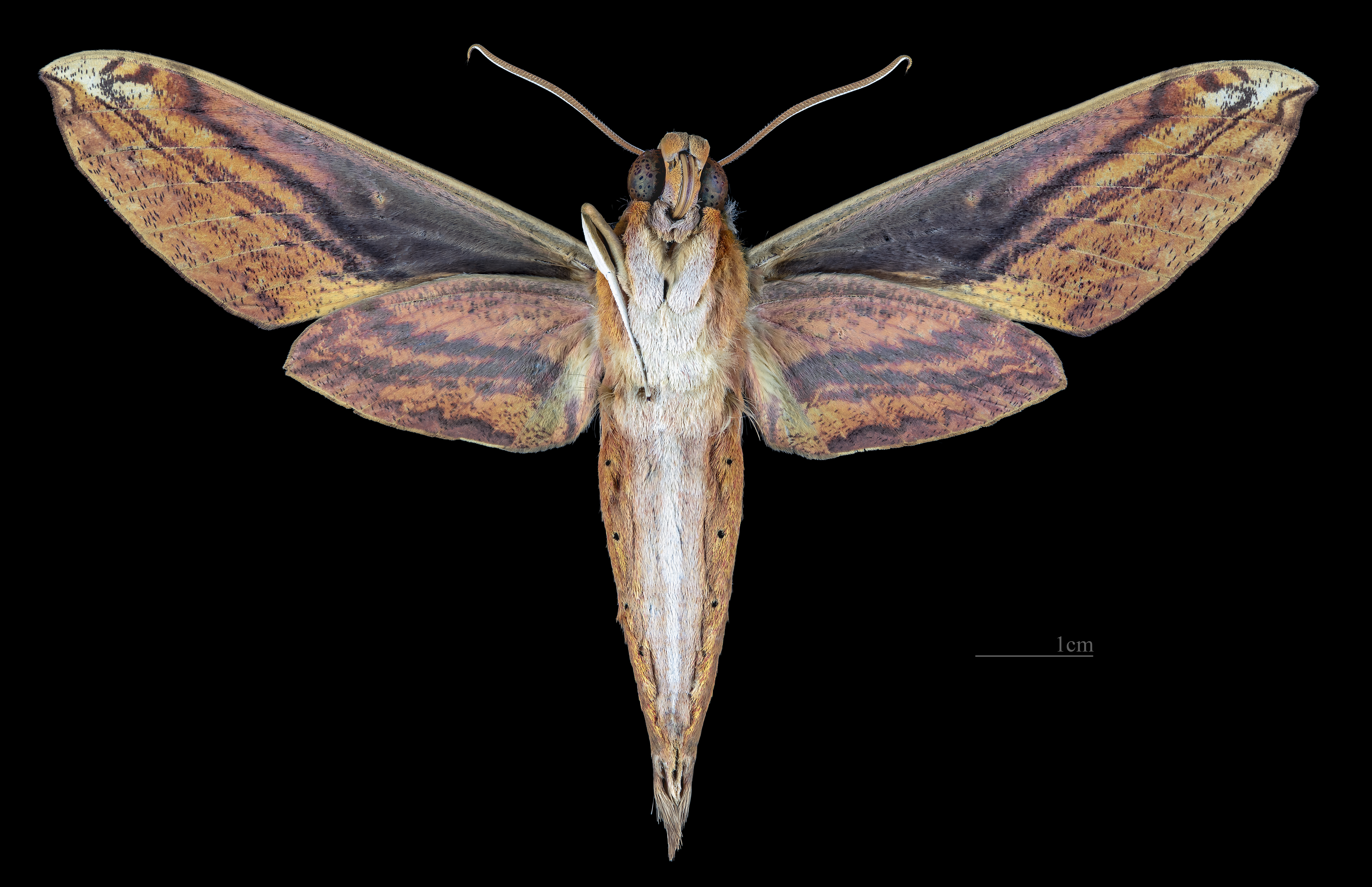
Male ventral

== Biology ==
Larva is bluish green, with a subdorsal line with oblique streaks below it on 4th to 10th somites. Ocellus on the 4th somite is greenish with a black ring. The horn is yellowish. Larvae have been recorded on Amaranthus, Barringtonia, Dioscorea, Amorphophallus, Impatiens, Citrullus, Arathis, Boerhavia, Knoxia, Morinda, Oldenlandia, Pongamia, Spermacoce, Glossostigma and Camellia.

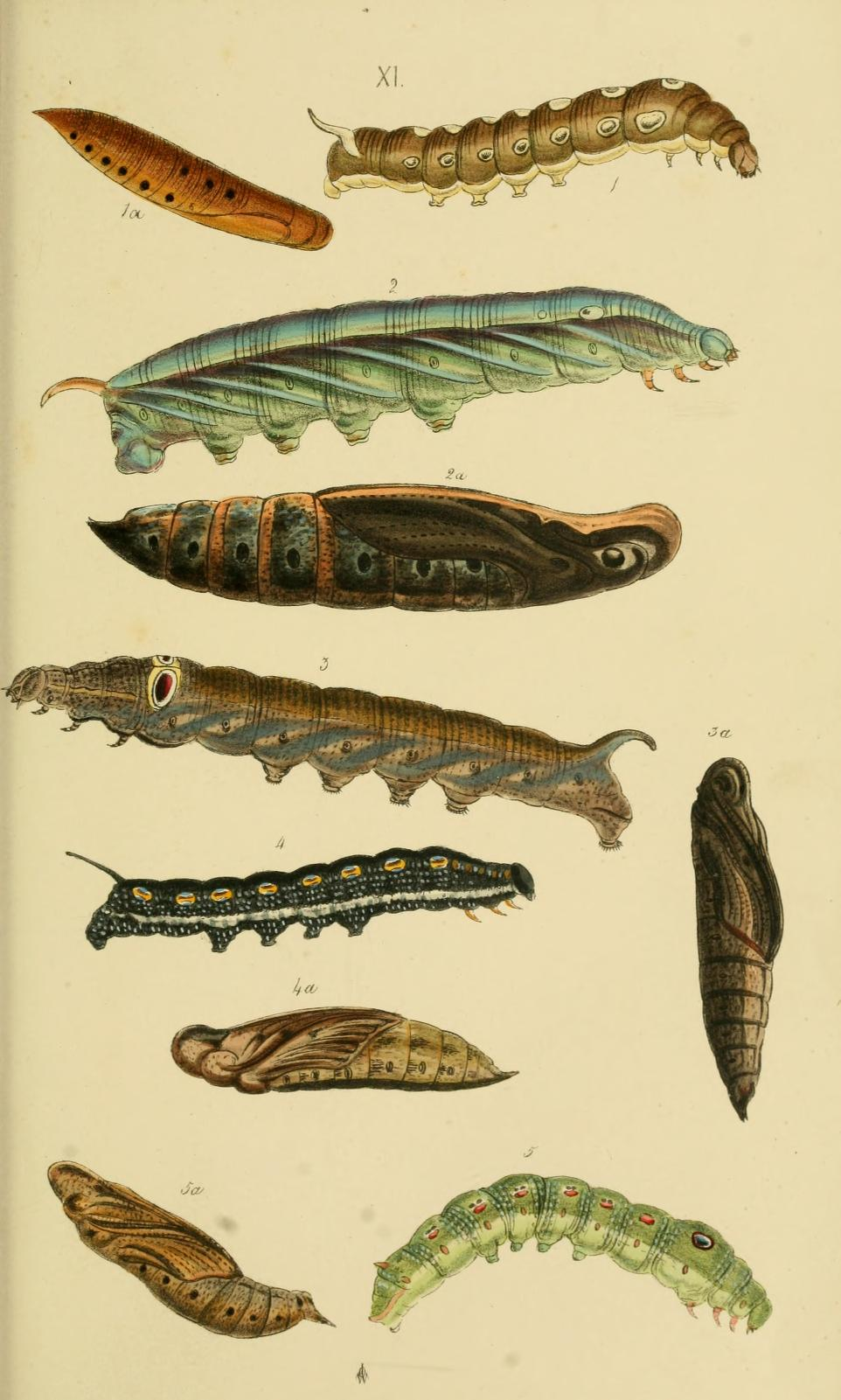
Theretra nessus larva (2) and pupa (2a)

== Subspecies ==
- Theretra nessus nessus - nominate from South Asia and South East Asian countries
- Theretra nessus albata Fukuda, 2003 (Fiji, New Caledonia, the Loyalty Islands and Rossel Island at the extreme eastern end of the Louisiade Archipelago)
