= Batopedina =

Scientific classification
- Kingdom: Plantae
- Clade: Tracheophytes
- Clade: Angiosperms
- Clade: Eudicots
- Clade: Asterids
- Order: Gentianales
- Family: Rubiaceae
- Subfamily: Rubioideae
- Tribe: Knoxieae
- Genus: Batopedina; Verdc.

Type species
- Batopedina linearifolia (Bremek.) Verdc.

Genus of plants

Batopedina is a genus of flowering plants in the family Rubiaceae. It was described by Bernard Verdcourt in 1953. The genus is found in Burkina Faso, Ghana, D.R.Congo, and Zambia.

== Species ==
- Batopedina linearifolia (Bremek.) Verdc.
  - Batopedina linearifolia var. glabra E.M.A.Petit - D.R.Congo
  - Batopedina linearifolia var. linearifolia - Zambia
- Batopedina pulvinellata Robbr.
  - Batopedina pulvinellata subsp. glabrifolia Robbr. - D.R.Congo
  - Batopedina pulvinellata subsp. pulvinellata - D.R.Congo
- Batopedina tenuis (A.Chev. ex Hutch. & Dalziel) Verdc. - Burkina Faso, Ghana
