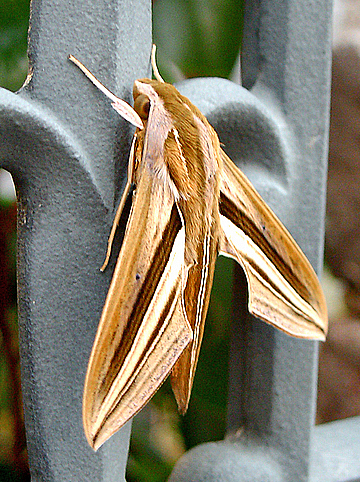

Scientific classification
- Kingdom: Animalia
- Phylum: Arthropoda
- Class: Insecta
- Order: Lepidoptera
- Family: Sphingidae
- Genus: Theretra
- Species: T. oldenlandiae

Binomial name
- Theretra oldenlandiae (Fabricius, 1775)

Synonyms
- Sphinx oldenlandiae Fabricius, 1775; Sphinx drancus Cramer, 1777; Deilephila proxima Austaut, 1892; Deilephila argentata Stevens, 1828; Chaerocampa sobria Walker, 1856; Chaerocampa puellaris Butler, 1876; Theretra oldenlandiae fuscata Gehlen, 1941; Theretra oldenlandiae olivascens Inoue, 1973; Chaerocampa argentata Butler, 1875; Chaerocampa firmata Walker, 1856; Sphinx oldenlandiae lewini Thon, 1828

= Theretra oldenlandiae =

Species of moth

Theretra oldenlandiae, the impatiens hawkmoth, taro hornworm or white-banded hunter hawkmoth, is a member of the family Sphingidae.

== Distribution ==
It is found in India, Sri Lanka, China, Borneo, Japan, the Philippines, Thailand, and Australia. It was described by Johan Christian Fabricius in 1775.

== Description ==
The species differs from Theretra lycetus in being greyish brown without pink suffusion and the two dorsal lines on the abdomen are silvery white. There are also oblique stripes on forewing and the sides of abdomen is ochreous, not golden. Hindwing with the submarginal band ochreous and narrow.

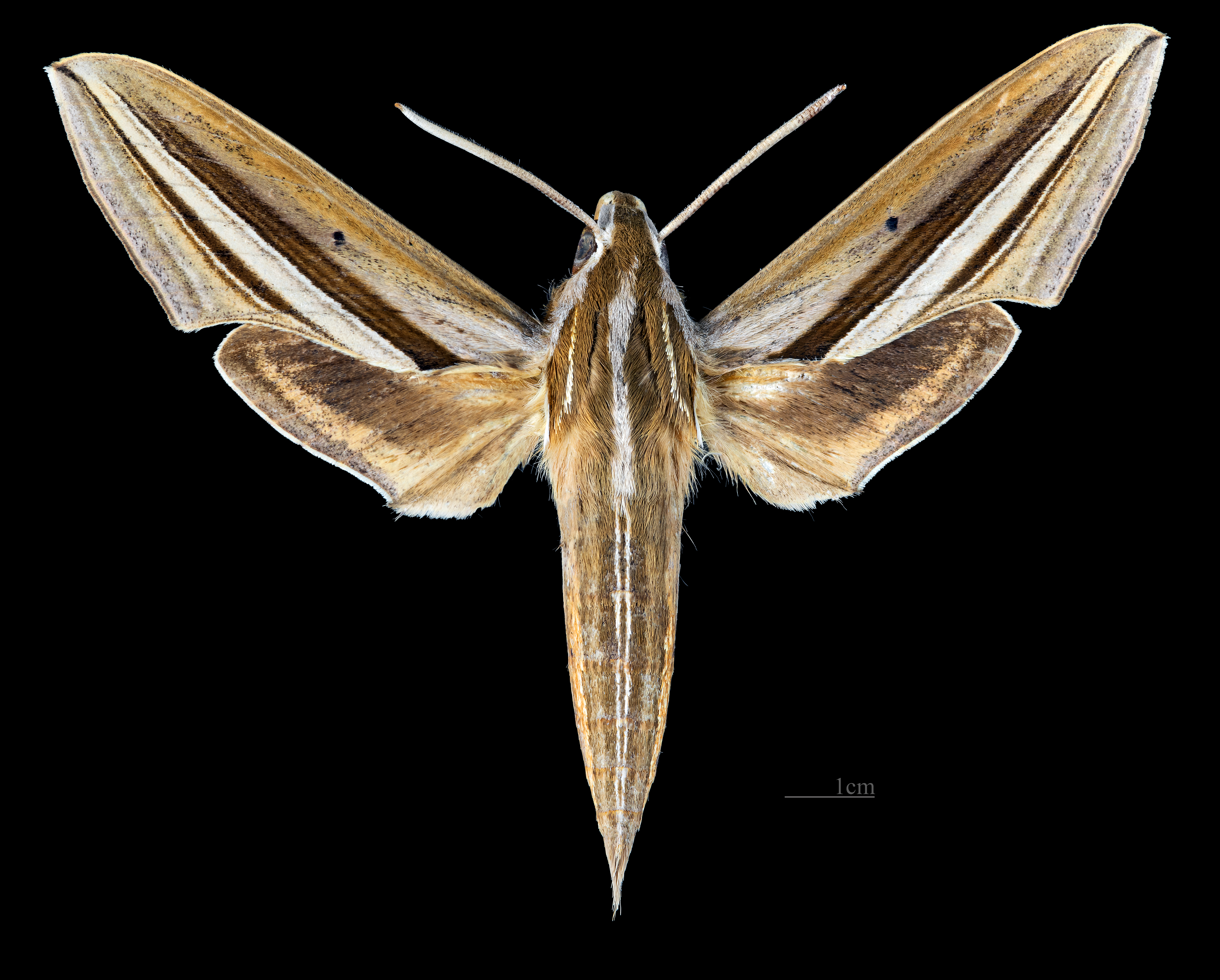
Male dorsal

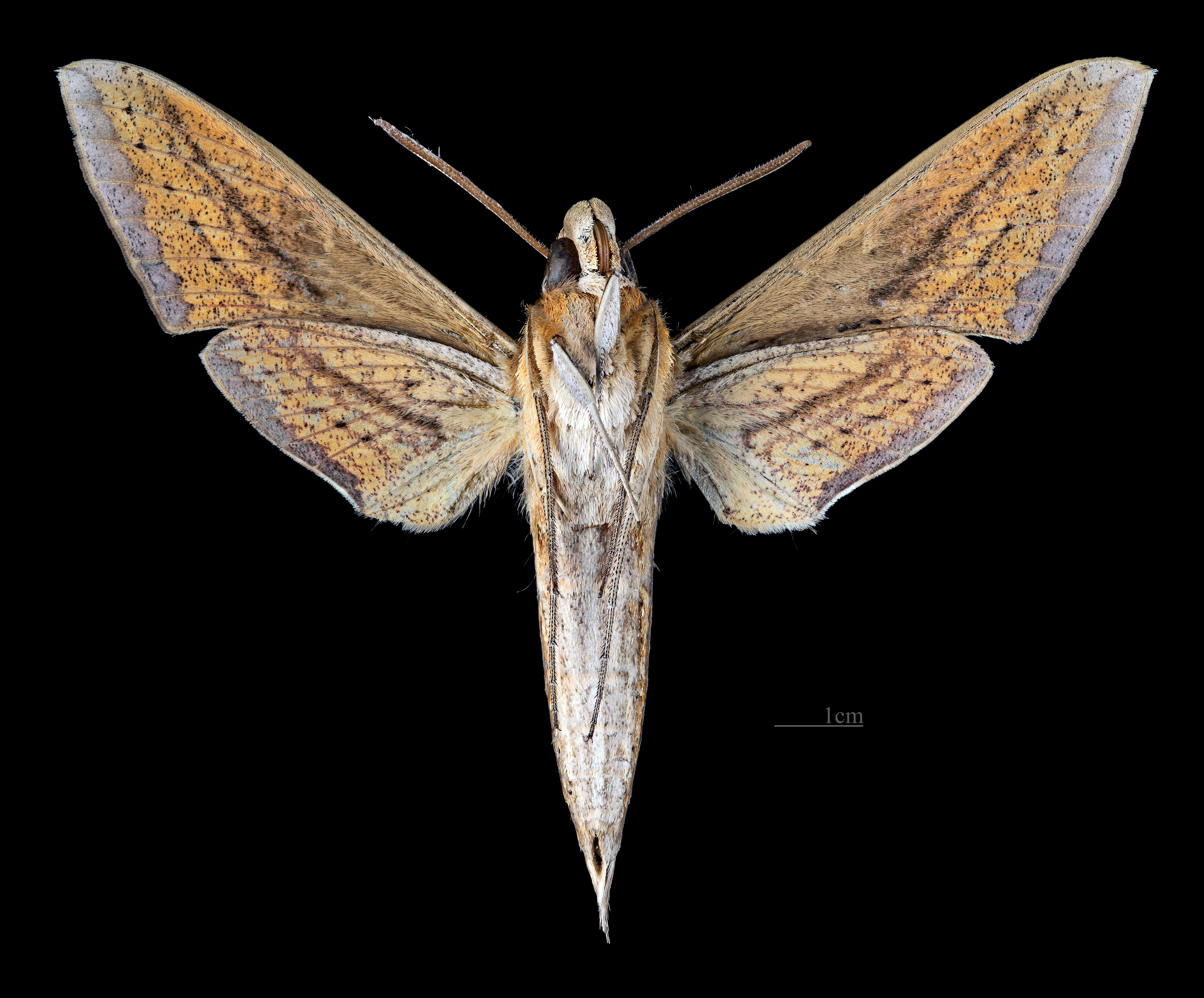
Male ventral

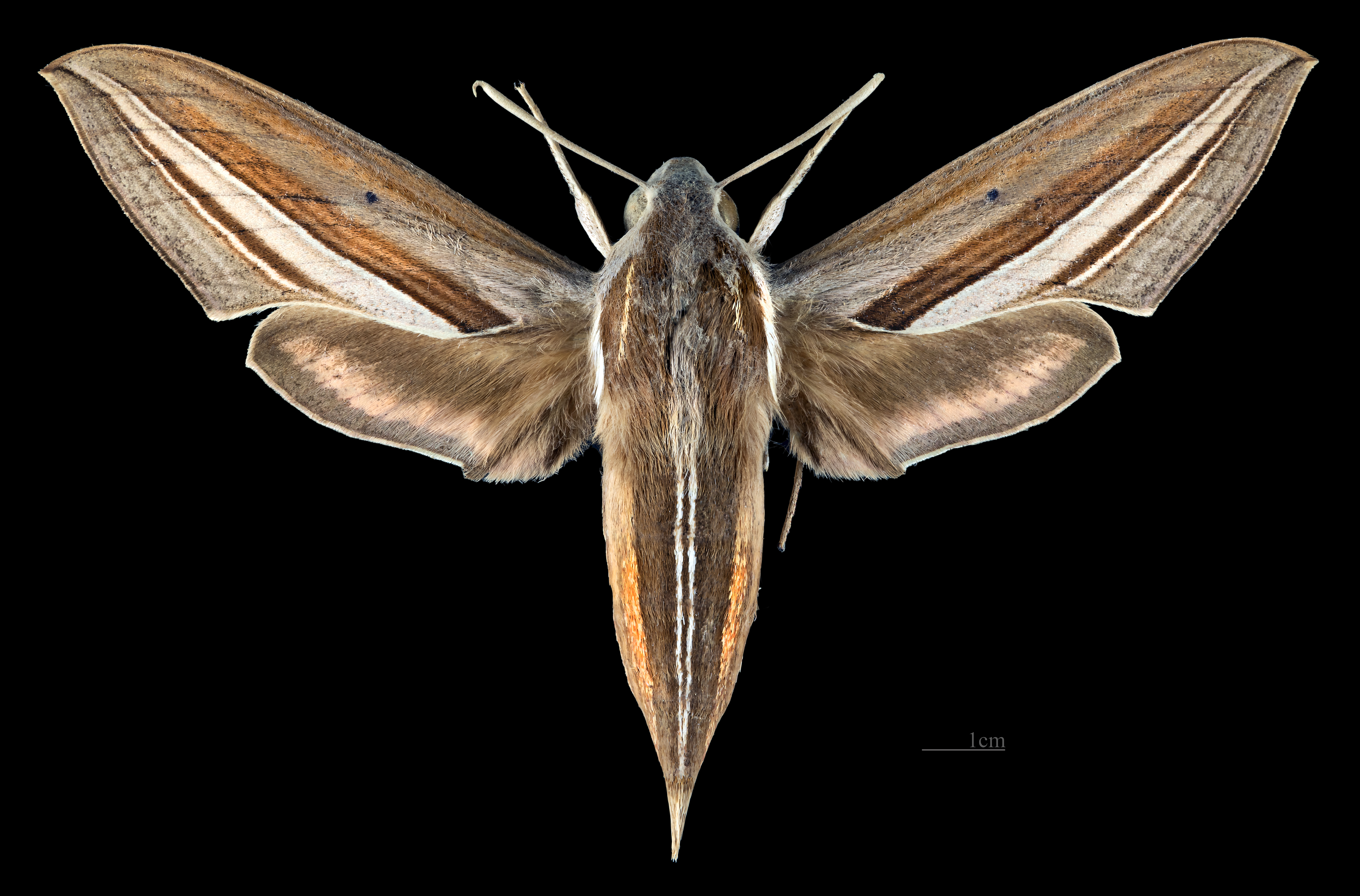
Female dorsal

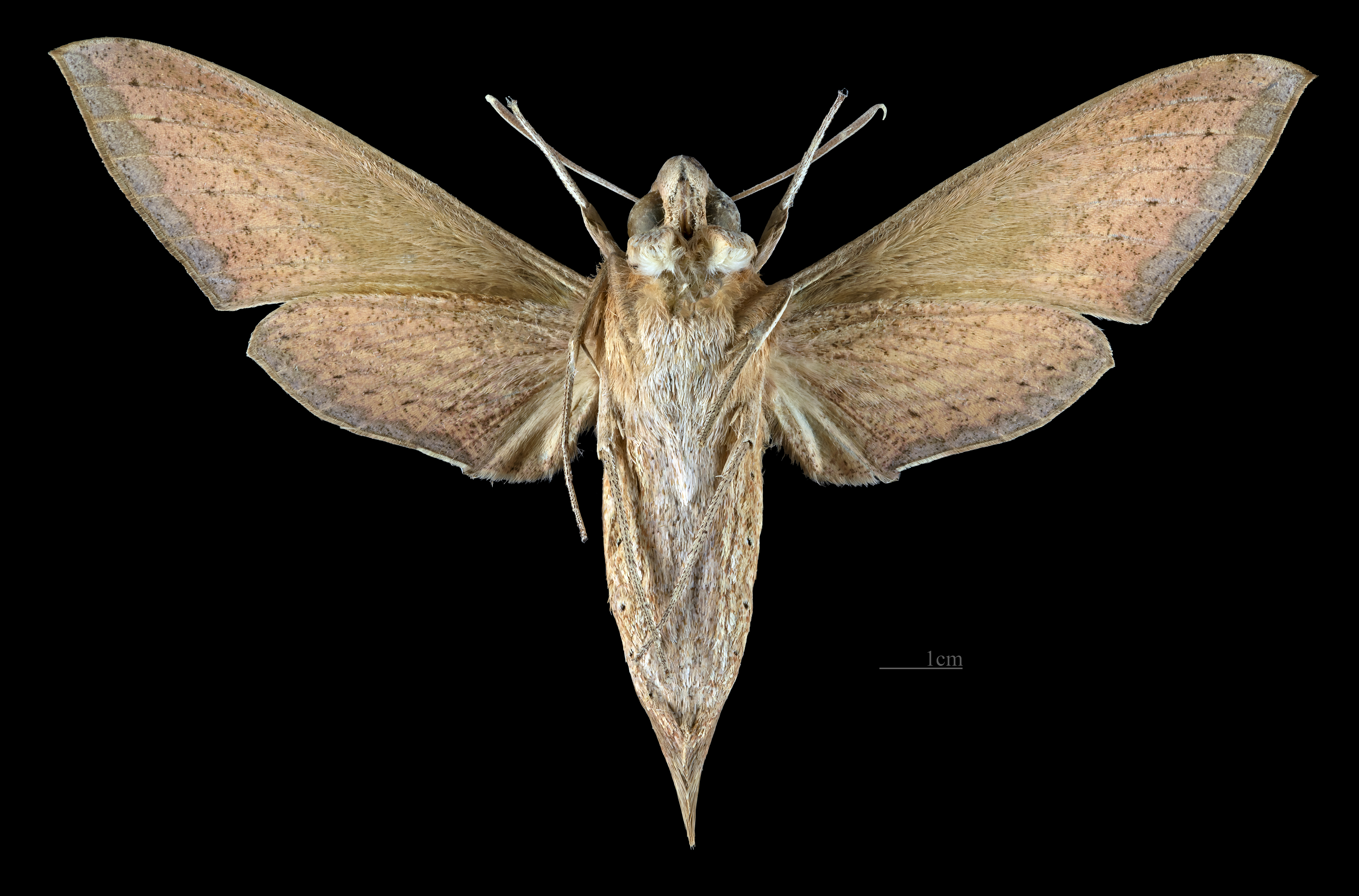
Female ventral

Larva is pale purplish brown. There is a yellow subdorsal line and white spots with a pale lateral line below them on the thoracic somites. Black-ringed ocelli can be seen on 4th to 10th somites, where the first two centered with blue, and posterior with purple. In the early instars, posterior ocelli are centered with crimson color with dorsal bands of yellow specks. The species is found in open lowland habitats. As the caterpillar crawls, it sweeps the tail-like horn, which is black and tipped in white, in an arc forwards and back.

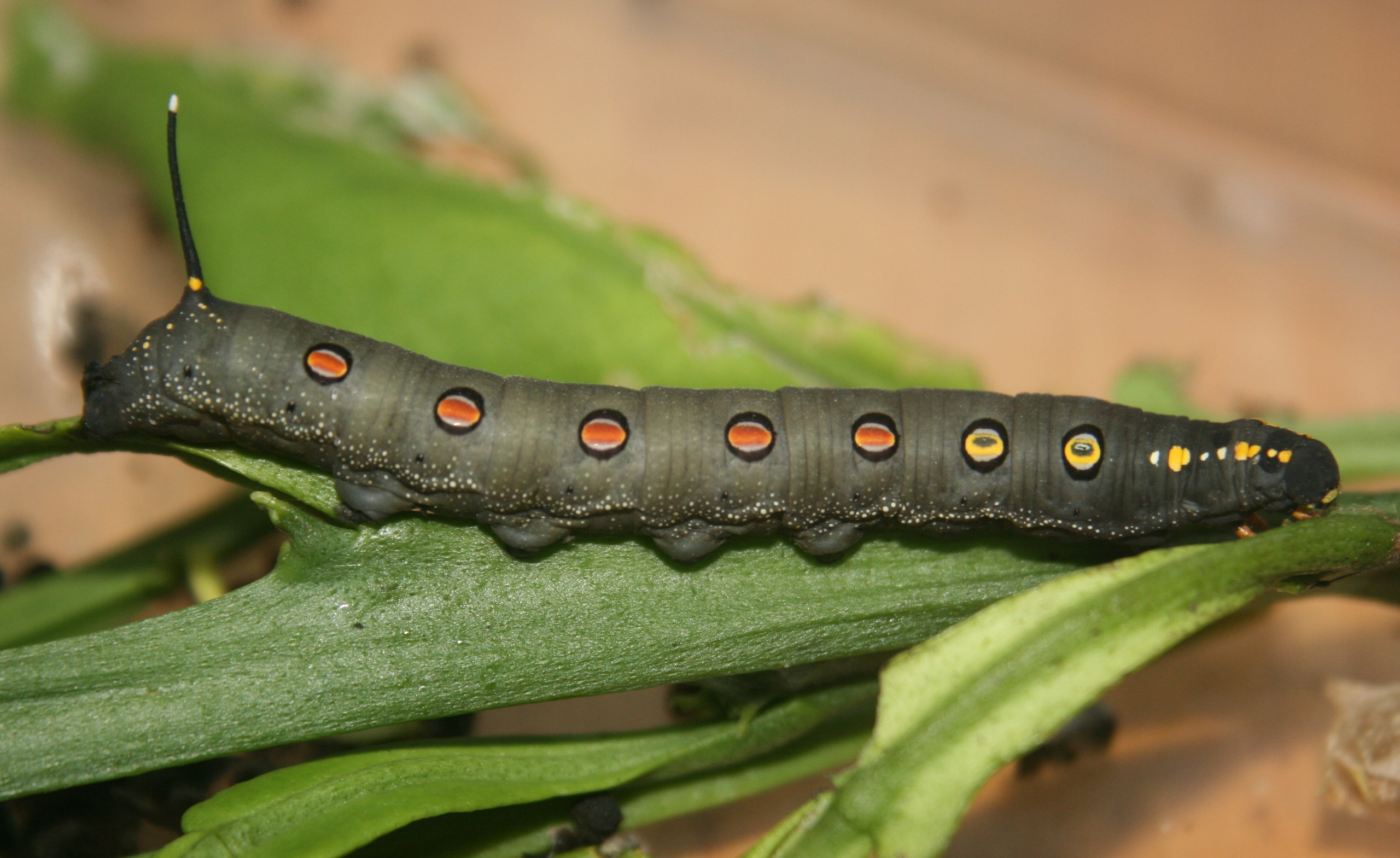

== Agriculture ==
They are often considered a pest on both busy lizzie (Impatiens wallerana) and fuchsias (Fuchsia sp.). Caterpillars of this species have also been seen feeding on arum lily (Zantedeschia aethiopica), Argentine trumpet vine (Clytostoma callistegioides), climbing guinea flower (Hibbertia scandens), billy goat plum (Planchonia careya), godetia (Clarkia amoena), star cluster (Pentas lanceolata), Australian native violet (Viola hederacea) and slender grape (Cayratia clematidea). The larvae are black with yellow dots, they have a small spine on their tails and use it as a mimicked head. Before pupating the caterpillar will reach a length of about 70 mm.

The adult is brown with light brown stripes down the thorax. The stripes are mimicked on the inner margin of the forewing.

== Subspecies ==
- Theretra oldenlandiae oldenlandiae (from Sri Lanka and southern India north to northern Pakistan, northern Afghanistan, Nepal, Bhutan and Myanmar. Then northeastwards through China to Taiwan, South Korea and Japan, and then southeastwards through South East Asia as far as the Andaman Islands, the Solomon Islands and the Philippines. Strongly migratory northward to northeastern China (Heilongjiang, Liaoning and Jilin), eastern Russia (Primorskiy Kray) and northern Japan)
- Theretra oldenlandiae lewini (Thon, 1828) (Australia)
- Theretra oldenlandiae samoana Gehlen, 1941 (Samoa)
