= Carphalea =

Scientific classification
- Kingdom: Plantae
- Clade: Tracheophytes
- Clade: Angiosperms
- Clade: Eudicots
- Clade: Asterids
- Order: Gentianales
- Family: Rubiaceae
- Subfamily: Rubioideae
- Tribe: Knoxieae
- Genus: Carphalea; Juss.

Type species
- Carphalea madagascariensis Lam.

Genus of plants

Carphalea is a genus of flowering plants in the family Rubiaceae. It is endemic to Madagascar.

== Species ==
As of March 2023, Plants of the World Online accepted three species:

- Carphalea cloiselii Homolle
- Carphalea linearifolia Homolle
- Carphalea madagascariensis Lam.
