= Paracarphalea =

Scientific classification
- Kingdom: Plantae
- Clade: Tracheophytes
- Clade: Angiosperms
- Clade: Eudicots
- Clade: Asterids
- Order: Gentianales
- Family: Rubiaceae
- Genus: Paracarphalea; Razafim., Ferm, B.Bremer & Kårehed

Genus of plants

Paracarphalea is a genus of flowering plants belonging to the family Rubiaceae.

Its native range is Madagascar.

Species:

- Paracarphalea angulata (Baill.) Razafim., Ferm, B.Bremer & Kårehed
- Paracarphalea kirondron (Baill.) Razafim., Ferm, B.Bremer & Kårehed
- Paracarphalea pervilleana (Baill.) Razafim., Ferm, B.Bremer & Kårehed
