= Flora of Tropical East Africa =

Multi-volume flora

The Flora of Tropical East Africa (FTEA) is a catalogue of all 12,104 known wild plant species in Uganda, Kenya, and Tanzania. The project began in 1948 and was finally completed in September 2012. Approximately 1,500 new plant species were described, by 135 botanists from 21 countries.

The Flora of Tropical East Africa, a project of Royal Botanic Gardens, Kew, is the largest regional tropical flora ever compiled. The species covered include 3–4% of the world's known plant species. When the project began in 1948, botanists thought they would be finished in fifteen years. Between 2008 and 2012 (before the project ended), 114 new species were described.

The FTEA is an important tool for conservation of plants, wildlife, and habitat in the entire region. Approximately 2,500 of the species are endemic, or unique, to the area. The project will be used in collaboration with groups such as the IUCN Red List of Threatened Species in order to protect those species threatened with habitat loss or extinction.

In 2023, a new study of records dating from 1952 to 2022 found 444 new and newly recorded species belonging to 81 families and 218 genera.

== See also ==
- Henk Jaap Beentje
- Bernard Verdcourt
- Flora of Tropical East Africa Feb-15
