= Rhodopentas =

Scientific classification
- Kingdom: Plantae
- Clade: Tracheophytes
- Clade: Angiosperms
- Clade: Eudicots
- Clade: Asterids
- Order: Gentianales
- Family: Rubiaceae
- Genus: Rhodopentas; Kårehed & B.Bremer

Genus of plants

Rhodopentas is a genus of flowering plants belonging to the family Rubiaceae.

Its native range is Southern Ethiopia to Southern Tropical Africa.

Species:

- Rhodopentas bussei (K.Krause) Kårehed & B.Bremer
- Rhodopentas parvifolia (Hiern) Kårehed & B.Bremer
