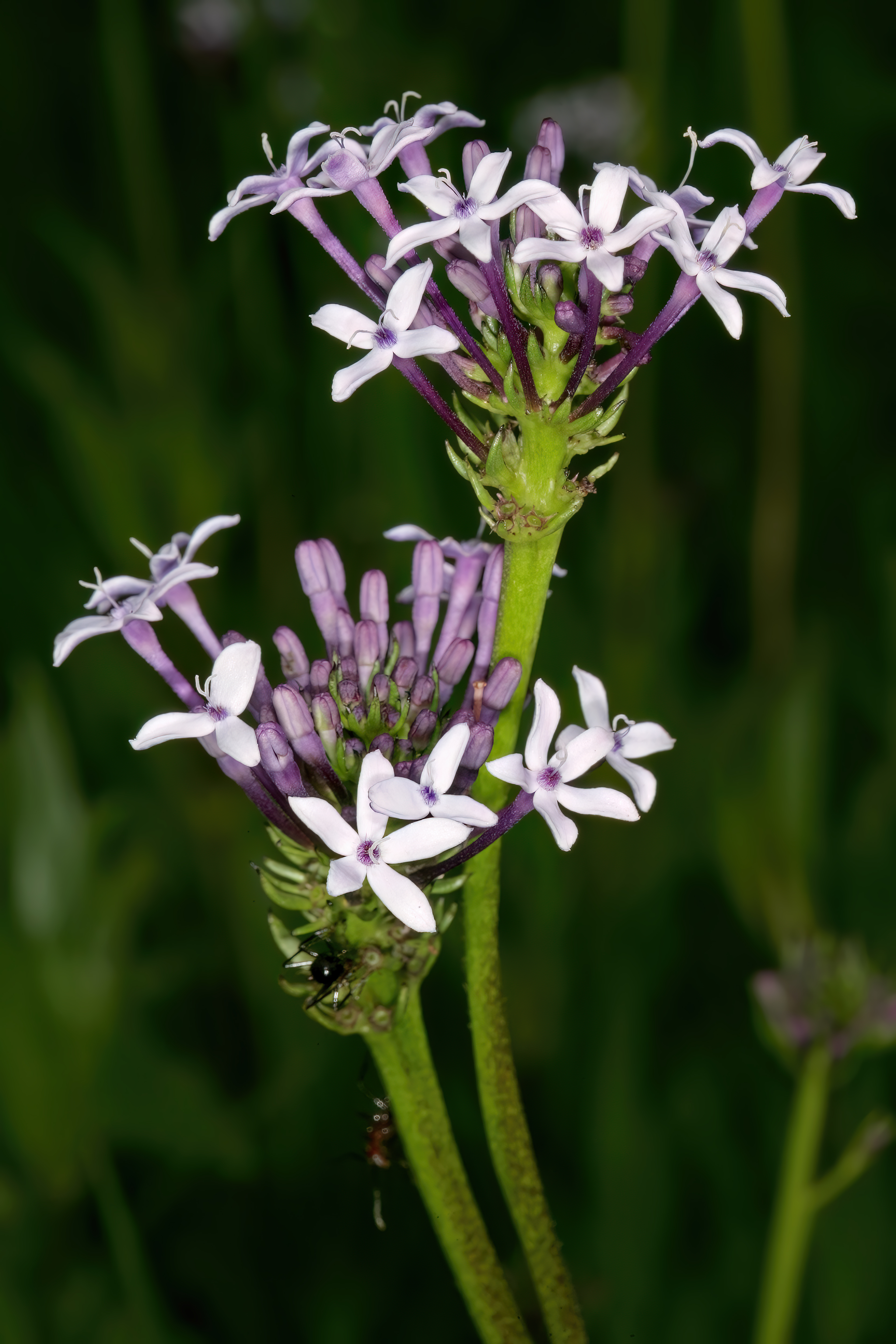

Scientific classification
- Kingdom: Plantae
- Clade: Tracheophytes
- Clade: Angiosperms
- Clade: Eudicots
- Clade: Asterids
- Order: Gentianales
- Family: Rubiaceae
- Genus: Pentanisia
- Species: P. angustifolia

Binomial name
- Pentanisia angustifolia (Hochst.) Hochst.

Synonyms
- Diotocarpus angustifolius Hochst.; Pentanisia variabilis var. glaucescens Cruse ex Sond.

= Pentanisia angustifolia =

Species of plant

Pentanisia angustifolia, also known as narrow-leaved pentanisia, is a species of flower that blooms in the early rains of southern Africa.

== Description ==
This plant has simple, undivided leaves, typical of the family.

== Range ==
Pentanisia angustifolia is found in eastern South Africa, Lesotho, eSwatini, and Mozambique.

== Habitat ==
Up to 800m in Mozambique and higher in the highveld.

== Ecology ==
The flower lives in the herb layer of woodlands.

== Etymology ==
Derived from Greek, "Penta-" (πέντα) means "five" and "-nisia" may come from the word "nisos" (νῆσος), which means "island" or "land." The specific epithet is derived from Latin, "angusti-" coming from "angustus," meaning "narrow" or "tight" and "-folia" coming from "folium," which means "leaf," hence the "narrow-leaved" reference in this flower's common name.

== Taxonomy ==
Synonyms include Diotocarpus angustifolius Hochst. and Pentanisia variabilis Harv. var. glaucescens Cruse ex Sond. The genus Diotocarpus was revised alongside other herbaceous Rubiaceae in 1952, having been considered a taxonomic synonym of Pentanisia.
