= Otomeria =

Scientific classification
- Kingdom: Plantae
- Clade: Tracheophytes
- Clade: Angiosperms
- Clade: Eudicots
- Clade: Asterids
- Order: Gentianales
- Family: Rubiaceae
- Genus: Otomeria; Benth.

Genus of plants

Otomeria is a genus of flowering plants belonging to the family Rubiaceae.

Its native range is Tropical Africa.

== Species ==
Species:

- Otomeria cameronica (Bremek.) Hepper
- Otomeria elatior (A.Rich.) Verdc.
- Otomeria guineensis Benth.
- Otomeria lanceolata Hiern
- Otomeria madiensis Oliv.
- Otomeria micrantha K.Schum.
- Otomeria oculata S.Moore
- Otomeria volubilis (K.Schum.) Verdc.
