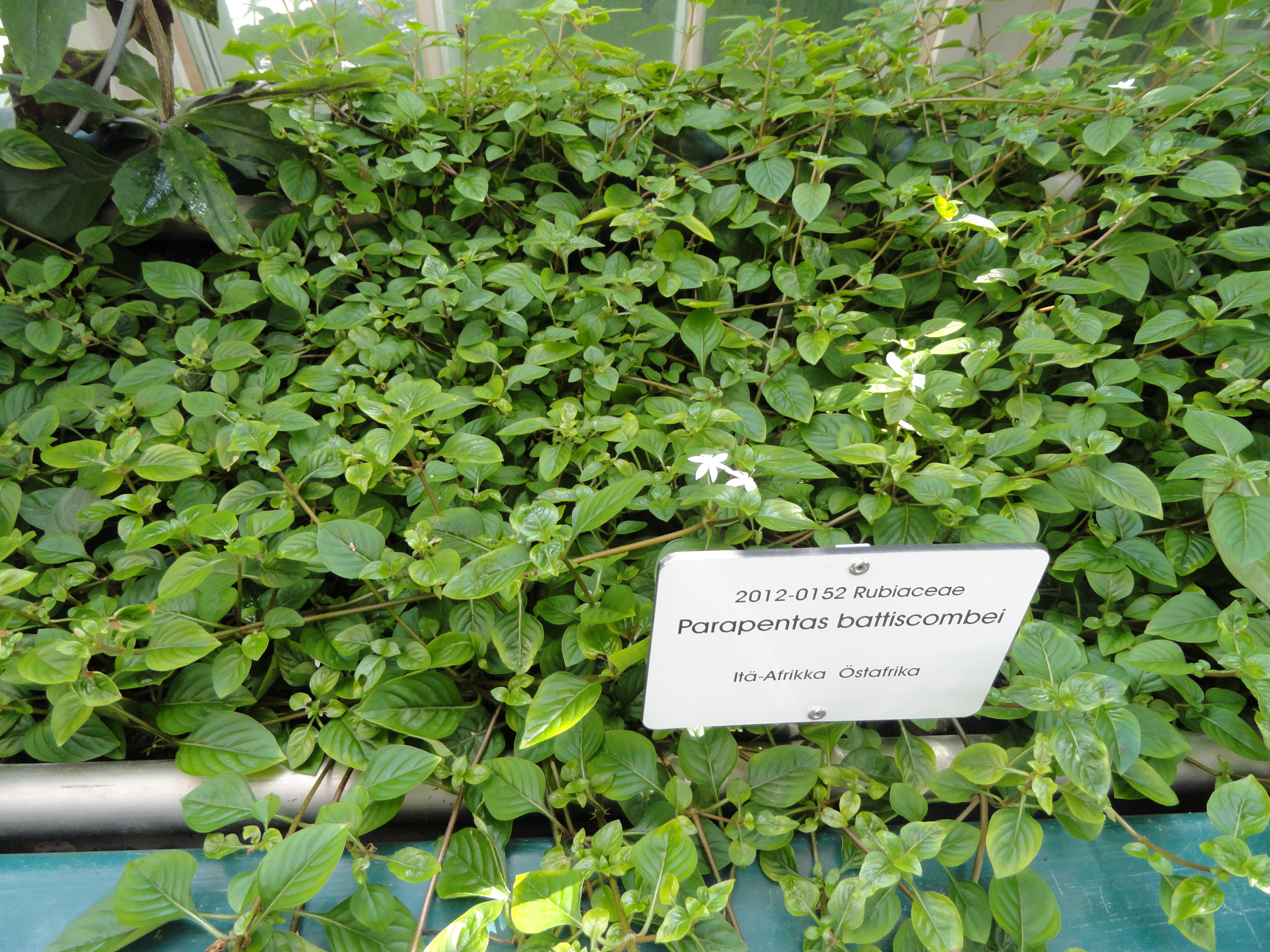
- Parapentas battiscombei at the University of Helsinki Botanical Garden

Scientific classification
- Kingdom: Plantae
- Clade: Tracheophytes
- Clade: Angiosperms
- Clade: Eudicots
- Clade: Asterids
- Order: Gentianales
- Family: Rubiaceae
- Genus: Parapentas; Bremek.

= Parapentas =

Genus of plants

Parapentas is a genus of flowering plants belonging to the family Rubiaceae.

Its native range is Tropical Africa.

== Species ==
Species:

- Parapentas battiscombei Verdc.
- Parapentas setigera (Hiern) Verdc.
- Parapentas silvatica (K.Schum.) Bremek.
