= Paraknoxia =

Scientific classification
- Kingdom: Plantae
- Clade: Tracheophytes
- Clade: Angiosperms
- Clade: Eudicots
- Clade: Asterids
- Order: Gentianales
- Family: Rubiaceae
- Genus: Paraknoxia; Bremek.

Genus of plants

Paraknoxia is a genus of flowering plants belonging to the family Rubiaceae.

Its native range is Central African Republic to Eastern and Southern Tropical Africa.

== Species ==
Species:

- Paraknoxia parviflora (Stapf ex Verdc.) Verdc. ex Bremek.
