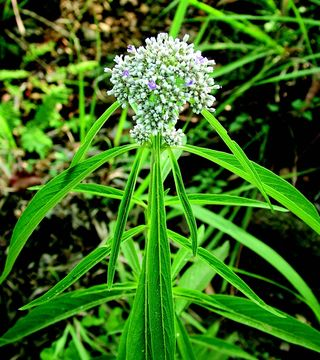
- Knoxia hookeriana

Scientific classification
- Kingdom: Plantae
- Clade: Tracheophytes
- Clade: Angiosperms
- Clade: Eudicots
- Clade: Asterids
- Order: Gentianales
- Family: Rubiaceae
- Subfamily: Rubioideae
- Tribe: Knoxieae
- Genus: Knoxia; L.

Type species
- Knoxia zeylanica L.

Synonyms
- Afroknoxia Verdc.; Baumannia K.Schum.; Cuncea Buch.-Ham. ex D.Don; Dentillaria Kuntze; Neobaumannia Hutch. & Dalziel; Vissadali Adans.

= Knoxia =

Genus of plants

Knoxia is a genus of flowering plants in the family Rubiaceae. The genus is known to be a rich source of anthraquinones.
