= Triainolepis =

Scientific classification
- Kingdom: Plantae
- Clade: Tracheophytes
- Clade: Angiosperms
- Clade: Eudicots
- Clade: Asterids
- Order: Gentianales
- Family: Rubiaceae
- Genus: Triainolepis; Hook.f.

Genus of plants

Triainolepis is a genus of flowering plants belonging to the family Rubiaceae.

Its native range is Eastern and Southern Tropical Africa, Western Indian Ocean.

Species:

- Triainolepis africana Hook.f.
- Triainolepis ampandrandavae (Bremek.) Kårehed & B.Bremer
