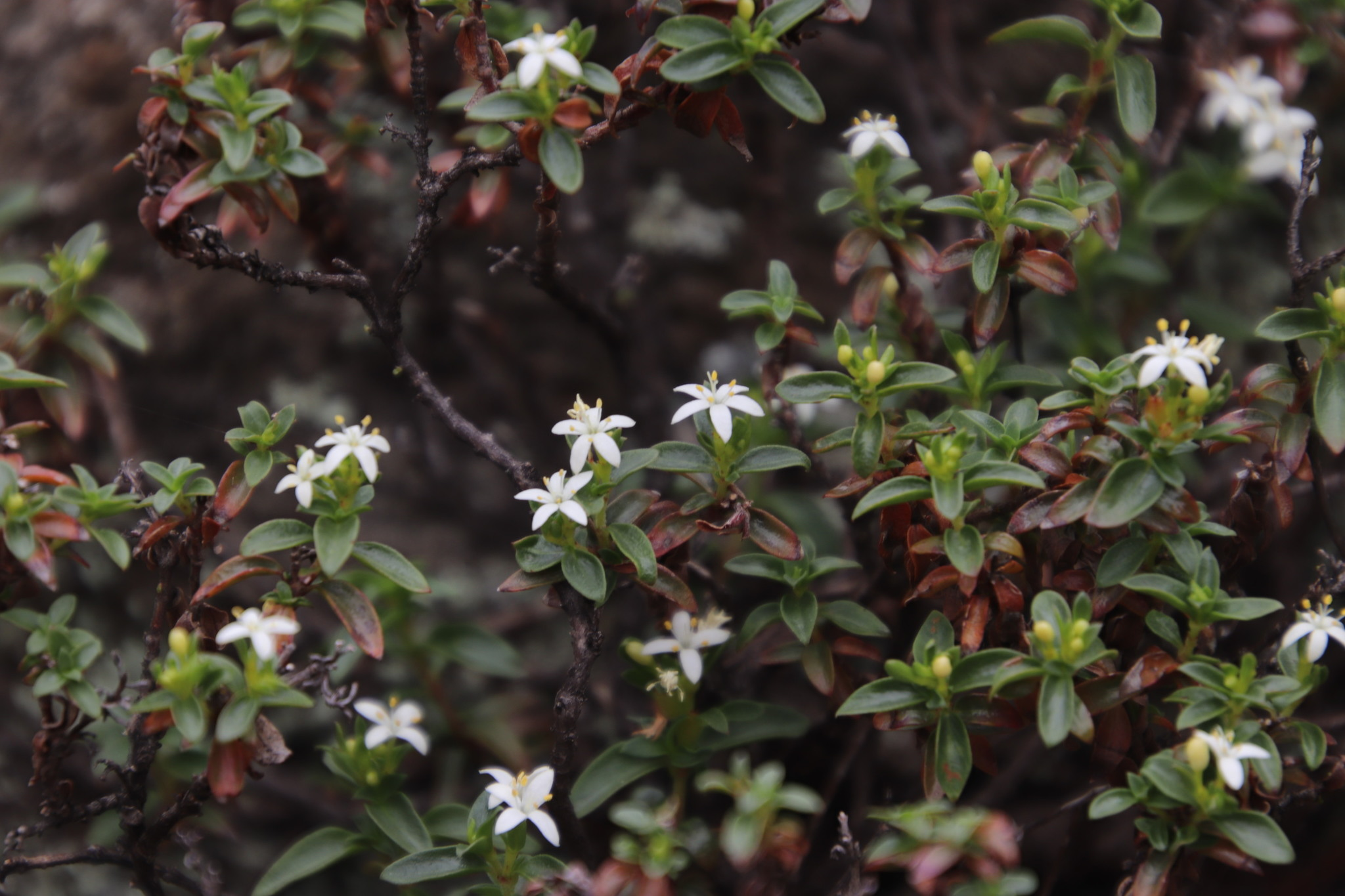
- Otiophora calycophylla

Scientific classification
- Kingdom: Plantae
- Clade: Tracheophytes
- Clade: Angiosperms
- Clade: Eudicots
- Clade: Asterids
- Order: Gentianales
- Family: Rubiaceae
- Genus: Otiophora; Zucc.

Synonyms
- Mericocalyx Bamps

= Otiophora (plant) =

Genus of flowering plants

Otiophora is a genus of plants in the family Rubiaceae. There are approximately 20 species. Natural distribution range for the genus includes Madagascar and much of central and southern Africa from South Africa north to Tanzania and Nigeria.
