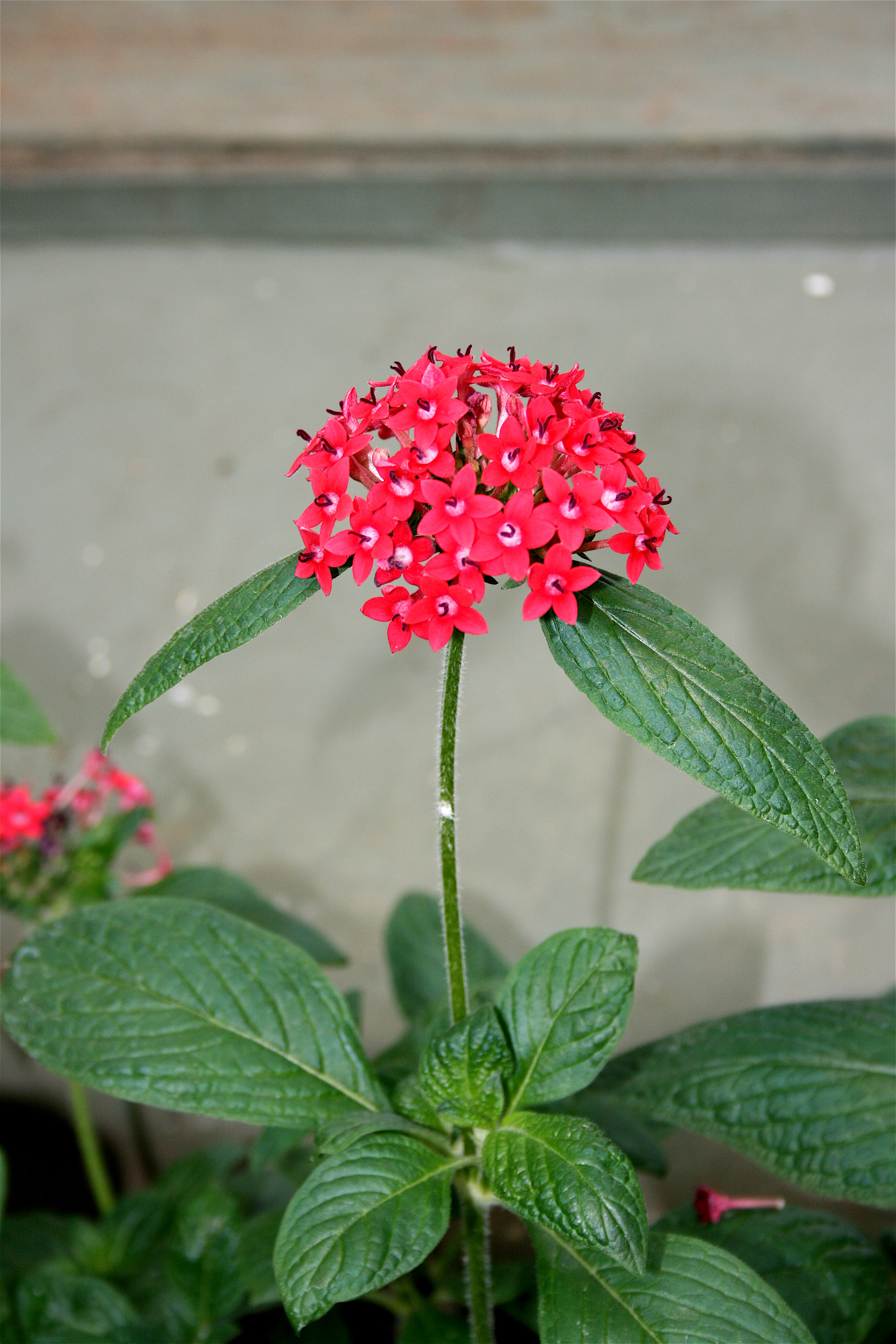
- P. lanceolata at Frederik Meijer Gardens and Sculpture Park

Scientific classification
- Kingdom: Plantae
- Clade: Tracheophytes
- Clade: Angiosperms
- Clade: Eudicots
- Clade: Asterids
- Order: Gentianales
- Family: Rubiaceae
- Genus: Pentas
- Species: P. lanceolata

Binomial name
- Pentas lanceolata (Forssk.) Deflers

Subspecies and varieties
- 8; see text

Synonyms
- Manettia lanceolata (Forssk.) Vahl (1790); Mussaenda aegyptiaca Poir. (1797), nom. illeg.; Mussaenda lanceolata (Forssk.) Spreng. (1824), nom. illeg.; Mussaenda luteola Delile (1827), nom. illeg.; Neurocarpaea lanceolata (Forssk.) R.Br. ex Hiern (1898); Ophiorrhiza lanceolata Forssk. (1775); Pseudomussaenda lanceolata (Forssk.) Wernham (1916); Vignaldia luteola Schweinf. (1867), nom. superfl.; Virecta lanceolata (Forssk.) Baill. (1880)

= Pentas lanceolata =

Species of plant

Pentas lanceolata, commonly known as Egyptian starcluster, is a species of flowering plant in the madder family, Rubiaceae that is native to tropical Africa from Sudan to Democratic Republic of the Congo and Mozambique, as well as Saudi Arabia and Yemen on the Arabian Peninsula. It is sometimes planted in butterfly gardens.

== Subspecies and varieties ==
Eight subspecies and varieties are accepted.

- Pentas lanceolata var. angustifolia Verdc. – Tanzania (Ufipa)
- Pentas lanceolata subsp. cymosa (Klotzsch) Verdc. – Comoro Islands
- Pentas lanceolata subsp. lanceolata – Eritrea to Mozambique and Saudi Arabia and Yemen
- Pentas lanceolata var. leucaster (K.Krause) Verdc. – eastern DR Congo to Ethiopia and northern Tanzania
- Pentas lanceolata var. nemorosa (Chiov.) Verdc. – Ethiopia, Kenya, and northern Tanzania
- Pentas lanceolata var. oncostipula (K.Schum.) Verdc. – Tanzania, Malawi, and Mozambique
- Pentas lanceolata subsp. quartiniana (A.Rich.) Verdc. – Eritrea, Ethiopia, Burundi, and eastern DR Congo
- Pentas lanceolata var. usambarica Verdc. – eastern Usambara Mountains of Tanzania
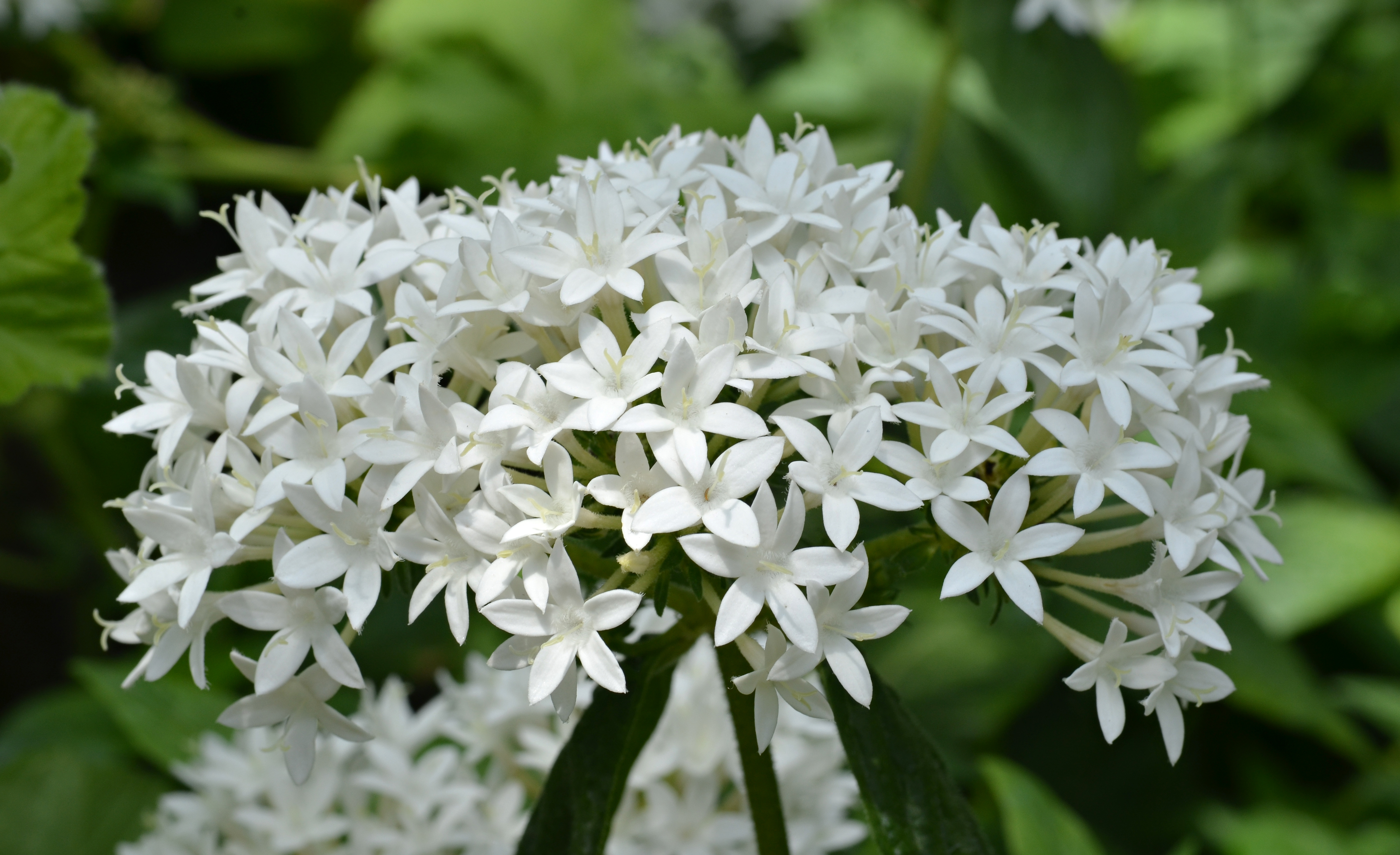
White flowers

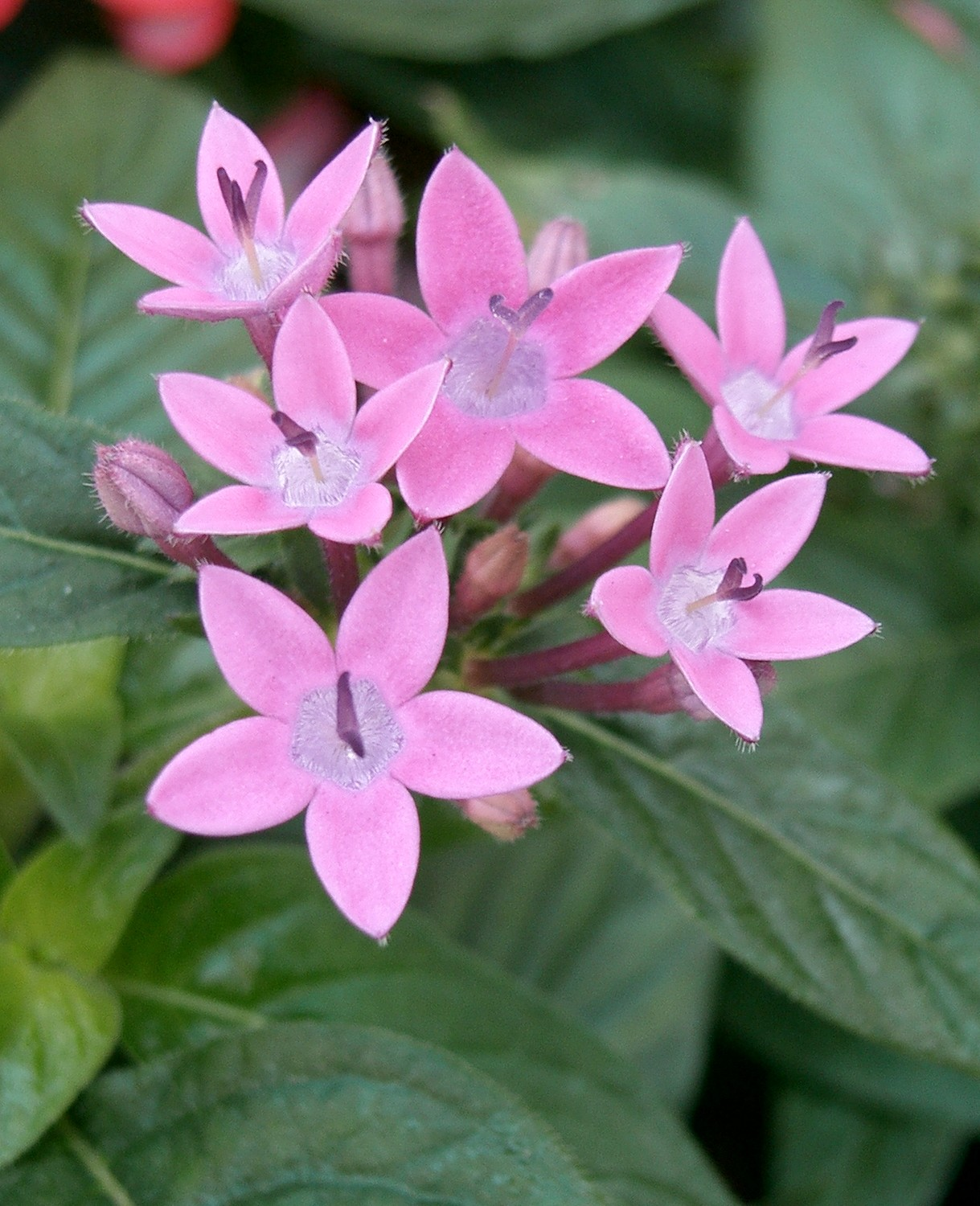
Pink flowers

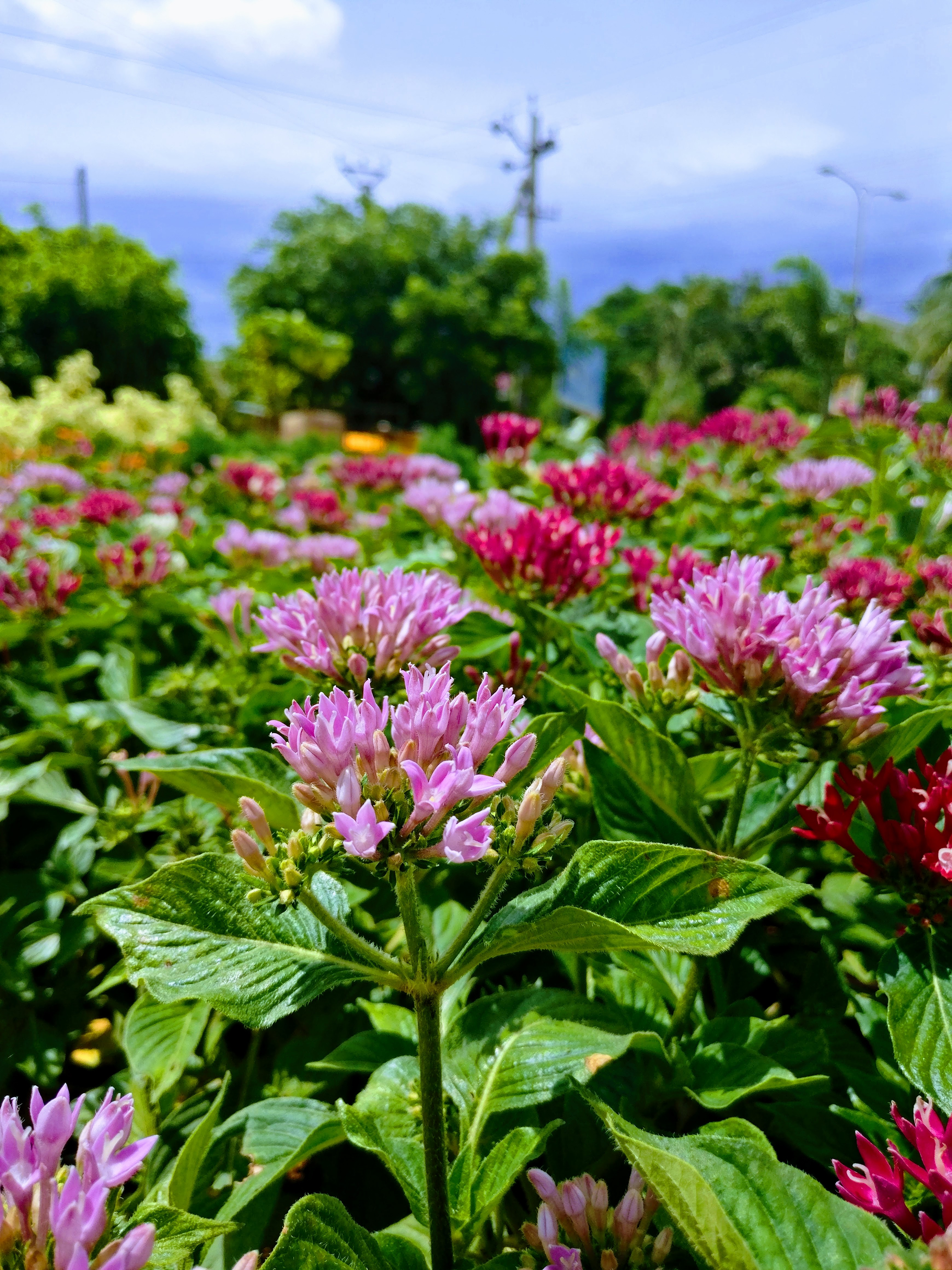
Pink flowers

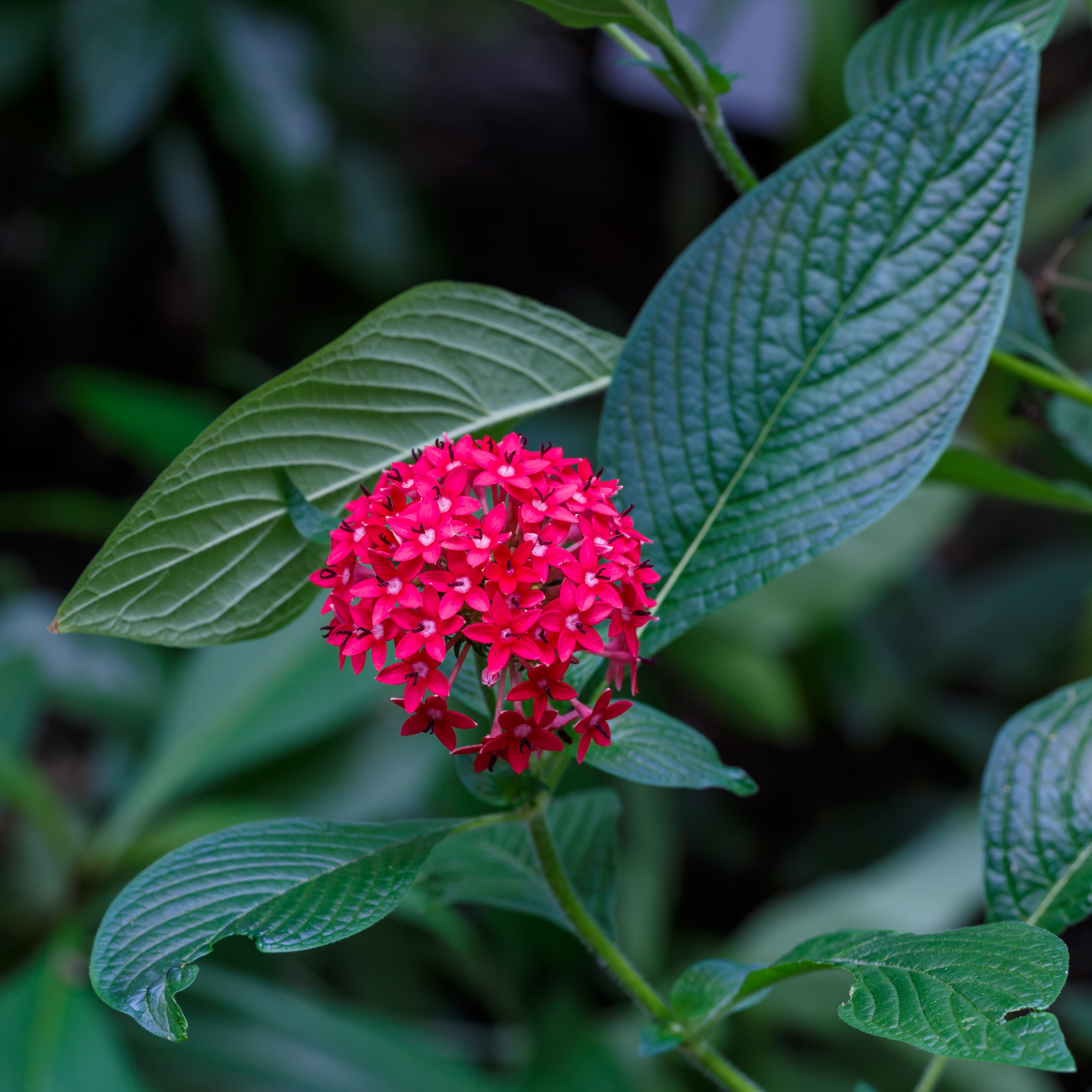
Red flowers
