= Bernard Verdcourt =

British biologist and taxonomist (1925–2011)

- Born: 20 January 1925; Luton, England
- Died: 25 October 2011 (aged 86); Maidenhead, Berkshire, England
- Scientific career
- Fields: Biology; Taxonomy
- Author abbrev. (botany): Verdc.

Bernard Verdcourt (20 January 1925 – 25 October 2011) was a biologist and taxonomist, most widely known as a botanist and latterly an honorary research fellow at the Royal Botanic Gardens, Kew in London. Prior to coming to Kew in 1964, he was associated with the East African Herbarium for 15 years. Although his best-known work probably consists of his many studies of the East African flora, he has also made extensive contributions relating to African terrestrial mollusks and to entomology. Dr. Verdcourt received the Linnean Medal for botany from the Linnean Society of London in 2000. His list of publications includes more than 1,000 scientific works. The standard author abbreviation Verdc. is used to indicate this person as the author when citing a botanical name.

== Eponymy ==
In 2012, botanists H.Ohashi & K.Ohashi published Verdesmum is a monotypic genus of flowering plants from Malaysia belonging to the family Fabaceae, it was named in Bernard Verdcourt's honour. In Rubiaceae, the names Chlorochorion Robbr. & Puff and Tricalysia verdcourtiana Robbr. are dedicated to him.

== Selected major works ==
- Verdcourt, B. (1951–1957). Notes on the snails of north-east Tanganyika Territory. [Eight parts]
- Verdcourt, B. et al. (1956–1995). Flora of Tropical East Africa. Kew Bulletin and other publications. [Accounts of 71 families]
- Verdcourt B. (1958) Remarks on the classification of the Rubiaceae. Bull. Jard. Bot. Etat, Brux. 28: 209–281.
- Verdcourt, B. et al. (2001–2005). Flora of Tropical East Africa. Rotterdam: Balkema. [Accounts of 12 families]
