= Birgitta Bremer =

Swedish botanist and academic

- Born: 17 January 1950 (age 76)
- Occupation: Botanist
- Known for: APG
- Scientific career
- Author abbrev. (botany): B.Bremer

Birgitta Bremer (born 17 January 1950), Swedish botanist and academic, is professor at Stockholm University, and director of the Bergius Botanic Garden.

== Career ==
Professor Bremer obtained her doctorate in botany in 1980 from Stockholm University, with the thesis "Taxonomy of mosses of the genus Schistidium".

In 1981 she was appointed docent at Stockholm University; 1983–1990 she was an instructor of systematics.

Between 1990 and 2000 she was systematic botany instructor; in 2000–2001 she served as dean of the department of systematics; 2000–2004 – professor of plant molecular systematics.

Since 2002 she has been director of the Bergius Fund and director of Botanical Garden. Since 2004 she has been a professor of systematics at Stockholm University.

== Achievements ==
On 11 February 2009 Professor Bremer, Professor Bergianus at the Bergius Foundation, The Royal Swedish Academy of Sciences, was elected a member of the Royal Swedish Academy of Sciences (Kungliga Vetenskapsakademien, KVA).

== Bibliography ==
The standard author abbreviation B.Bremer is used to indicate this person as the author when citing a botanical name.

=== Articles ===
- Bremer, Birgitta; Eriksson, Torsten (August 2009). "Time Tree of Rubiaceae: Phylogeny and Dating the Family, Subfamilies, and Tribes". International Journal of Plant Sciences. 170 (6): 766–793. Bibcode:2009IJPlS.170..766B. doi:10.1086/599077. S2CID 49332892 – via University of Chicago.
- Kårehed, Jesper; Groeninckx, Inge; Dessein, Steven; Motley, Timothy J.; Bremer, Birgitta (December 2008). "The phylogenetic utility of chloroplast and nuclear DNA markers and the phylogeny of the Rubiaceae tribe Spermacoceae". Molecular Phylogenetics and Evolution. 49 (3): 843–866. Bibcode:2008MolPE..49..843K. doi:10.1016/j.ympev.2008.09.025. PMID 18950720.
- Oxelman, Bengt; Kornhall, Per; Olmstead, Richard G.; Bremer, Birgitta (1 May 2005). "Further Disintegration of Scrophulariaceae". Taxon. 54 (2): 411–425. Bibcode:2005Taxon..54..411O. doi:10.2307/25065369. JSTOR 25065369.
- Razafimandimbison, Sylvain G.; Moog, Joachim; Lantz, Henrik; Maschwitz, Ulrich; Bremer, Birgitta (February 2005). "Re-assessment of monophyly, evolution of myrmecophytism, and rapid radiation in Neonauclea s.s. (Rubiaceae)". Molecular Phylogenetics and Evolution. 34 (2): 334–354. Bibcode:2005MolPE..34..334R. doi:10.1016/j.ympev.2004.10.005. PMID 15619446.
- Bremer, Birgitta; et al. (April 2003). "An update of the Angiosperm Phylogeny Group classification for the orders and families of flowering plants: APG II". Botanical Journal of the Linnean Society. 141 (4): 399–436. doi:10.1046/j.1095-8339.2003.t01-1-00158.x.
- Novotny, Vojtech; Basset, Yves; Miller, Scott E.; Weiblen, George D.; Bremer, Birgitta; Cizek, Lukas; Drozd, Pavel (25 April 2002). "Low host specificity of herbivorous insects in a tropical forest". Nature. 416 (6883): 841–844. Bibcode:2002Natur.416..841N. doi:10.1038/416841a. PMID 11976681. S2CID 74583.
- Backlund, Maria; Oxelman, Bengt; Bremer, Birgitta (July 2000). "Phylogenetic relationships within the Gentianales based on NDHF and RBCL sequences, with particular reference to the Loganiaceae". American Journal of Botany. 87 (7): 1029–1043. doi:10.2307/2657003. JSTOR 2657003. PMID 10898781.
- Eriksson, Ove; Bremer, Birgitta (February 1992). "Pollination Systems, Dispersal Modes, Life Forms, and Diversification Rates in Angiosperm Families". Evolution. 46 (1): 258–266. Bibcode:1992Evolu..46..258E. doi:10.1111/j.1558-5646.1992.tb02000.x. JSTOR 2409820. PMID 28564968. S2CID 39336718.

=== Books ===
- Birgitta Bremer. 1980. Taxonomy of Schistidium (Grimmiaceae, Bryophyta). 8 pp. ISBN 9171461043
- Kåre Bremer, Birgitta Bremer, Mats Thulin. 2003. Introduction to phylogeny and systematics of flowering plants. Volume 33, Nº 2 de Acta Universitatis Upsaliensis: Symbolae botanicae Upsalienses. 7ª edición ilustrada de Uppsala Universitet, 102 pp. ISBN 9155458289
- birgitta Bremer. 1992. Phylogeny of the Rubiaceae (Chiococceae) based on Molecular and MOrphological data – Useful Approaches for Classification and Comparative Ecology. Volume 72 and 79 of Annals of the Missouri Botanical Garden. 767 pp.
