= List of Spermacoce species =

As of November 2024, the following 291 species were accepted in the genus Spermacoce:

== A ==
- Spermacoce adscendens Willd.
- Spermacoce aequabilis Harwood
- Spermacoce affinis (DC.) R.M.Salas
- Spermacoce alata Aubl.
- Spermacoce amapaensis (E.L.Cabral & Bacigalupo) ined.
- Spermacoce angustifolia (Span.) Boerl.
- Spermacoce annua Verdc.
- Spermacoce aprica (Hiern) Govaerts
- Spermacoce aquatica Vell.
- Spermacoce aretioides (Griseb.) Kuntze
- Spermacoce argentea (Cham.) Kuntze
- Spermacoce argillacea Harwood
- Spermacoce aristeguietana (Steyerm.) Govaerts
- Spermacoce articularis L.f.
- Spermacoce arvensis (Hiern) R.D.Good
- Spermacoce aurantiiseta Harwood
- Spermacoce auriculata F.Muell.
- Spermacoce azurea Verdc.

== B ==
- Spermacoce bahamensis (Britton) Howard
- Spermacoce bahiana (E.L.Cabral) ined.
- Spermacoce baileyana Domin
- Spermacoce bambusicola (Berhaut) J.-P.Lebrun & Stork
- Spermacoce bangweolensis (R.E.Fr.) Verdc.
- Spermacoce bequaertii (De Wild.) Verdc.
- Spermacoce berteroana Howard
- Spermacoce bisepala Verdc.
- Spermacoce bolivarensis (Steyerm.) Govaerts
- Spermacoce brachyantha Verdc.
- Spermacoce brachysepala (Urb.) Alain
- Spermacoce brachystema R.Br. ex Benth.
- Spermacoce brachystemonoides (Cham. & Schltdl.) Kuntze
- Spermacoce bradei (Standl.) Govaerts
- Spermacoce brassii Gideon
- Spermacoce brevicilia Harwood
- Spermacoce brevidens Harwood
- Spermacoce breviflora F.Muell. ex Benth.
- Spermacoce brittonii (Standl.) Howard
- Spermacoce brownii Rusby
- Spermacoce buchneri (K.Schum.) Govaerts
- Spermacoce buckleyi Fosberg
- Spermacoce burchellii (E.L.Cabral & Bacigalupo) Delprete
- Spermacoce burmanni DC.

== C ==
- Spermacoce calliantha Harwood
- Spermacoce capillaris (Correll) Howard
- Spermacoce capitata Ruiz & Pav.
- Spermacoce cardiophora Harwood
- Spermacoce cassuangensis R.D.Good
- Spermacoce cataractarum (Steyerm.) Govaerts
- Spermacoce caudata Harwood
- Spermacoce cerradoana (E.L.Cabral, R.M.Salas & J.D.Soto) Govaerts
- Spermacoce chaetocephala DC.
- Spermacoce chartensis (Standl.) Govaerts
- Spermacoce clinopodioides (Standl.) Govaerts
- Spermacoce confertifolia (Steyerm.) Govaerts
- Spermacoce confusa Rendle
- Spermacoce congensis (Bremek.) Verdc.
- Spermacoce congestanthera Harwood
- Spermacoce constricta Harwood
- Spermacoce crispata (K.Schum.) Delprete
- Spermacoce cristulata Domin
- Spermacoce cupularis (DC.) Kuntze

== D ==
- Spermacoce dasycephala (Cham. & Schltdl.) Delprete
- Spermacoce debilis Benth.
- Spermacoce decipiens (K.Schum.) Kuntze
- Spermacoce decurrens Vell.
- Spermacoce delicatula (E.L.Cabral) Delprete
- Spermacoce densiflora (DC.) Alain
- Spermacoce deserti N.E.Br.
- Spermacoce dibrachiata Oliv.
- Spermacoce dimorpha (J.H.Kirkbr.) Delprete
- Spermacoce discreta Harwood
- Spermacoce dispersa (Hook.f.) Kuntze
- Spermacoce divaricata (Hook.f.) Kuntze
- Spermacoce diversistyla Harwood
- Spermacoce dolichosperma Harwood
- Spermacoce dussii (Standl.) Howard

== E ==
- Spermacoce egleri (Sucre & C.G.Costa) Govaerts
- Spermacoce elaiosoma Harwood
- Spermacoce erectiloba Harwood
- Spermacoce erioclada DC.
- Spermacoce erosa Harwood
- Spermacoce eryngioides (Cham. & Schltdl.) Kuntze
- Spermacoce erythrosepala Harwood
- Spermacoce evenia (Standl.) Govaerts
- Spermacoce everistiana Fosberg
- Spermacoce exasperata Urb.
- Spermacoce exilis (L.O.Williams) C.D.Adams ex W.C.Burger & C.M.Taylor

== F ==
- Spermacoce fabiformis Harwood
- Spermacoce felis-insulae (Correll) R.A.Howard
- Spermacoce filifolia (Schumach. & Thonn.) J.-P.Lebrun & Stork
- Spermacoce filiformis Hiern
- Spermacoce filituba (K.Schum.) Verdc.
- Spermacoce flagelliformis Poir.
- Spermacoce fruticosa (Standl.) Govaerts

== G ==
- Spermacoce galeopsidis DC.
- Spermacoce garuensis (K.Krause) Govaerts
- Spermacoce gibba Harwood
- Spermacoce gilliesiae (Specht) J.R.Clarkson
- Spermacoce glabra Michx.
- Spermacoce gracillima (DC.) Delprete
- Spermacoce graniticola Harwood
- Spermacoce guimaraesensis (E.L.Cabral & Bacigalupo) ined.

== H ==
- Spermacoce hepperiana Verdc.
- Spermacoce heteromorpha Dessein
- Spermacoce hillii (Chippend.) Govaerts
- Spermacoce hispida L.
- Spermacoce hockii (De Wild.) Dessein
- Spermacoce huillensis (Hiern) R.D.Good
- Spermacoce humifusa Willd.
- Spermacoce hyssopifolia Willd.

== I ==
- Spermacoce inaguensis (Britton) Howard
- Spermacoce inaperta F.Muell.
- Spermacoce incognita (E.L.Cabral) Delprete
- Spermacoce inconspicua Bartl. ex DC.
- Spermacoce intricans (Hepper) H.M.Burkill
- Spermacoce intricata (Steyerm.) Govaerts
- Spermacoce ipecacuana Larrañaga
- Spermacoce irwiniana (E.L.Cabral) Delprete
- Spermacoce ivorensis Govaerts

== J ==
- Spermacoce jacobsonii F.M.Bailey
- Spermacoce jaliscensis M.E.Jones
- Spermacoce jangouxii (Steyerm.) Govaerts
- Spermacoce johnwoodii (E.L.Cabral & R.M.Salas) Govaerts
- Spermacoce juncta Harwood

== K ==
- Spermacoce keyensis Small
- Spermacoce kirkii (Hiern) Verdc.

== L ==
- Spermacoce laevicaulis Miq.
- Spermacoce laevigata F.Muell.
- Spermacoce lagunensis (M.E.Jones) Govaerts
- Spermacoce lamprosperma Harwood
- Spermacoce lancea (Hiern) Govaerts
- Spermacoce lasiocarpa R.Br.
- Spermacoce latifolia Aubl.
- Spermacoce latimarginata Harwood
- Spermacoce latituba (K.Schum.) Verdc.
- Spermacoce ledermannii (K.Krause) Govaerts
- Spermacoce leptoloba Benth.
- Spermacoce lignosa Harwood
- Spermacoce limae (Sucre) Govaerts
- Spermacoce linearifolia (Hook.f.) Kuntze
- Spermacoce linoides (DC.) ined.
- Spermacoce litoralis (Urb.) Alain
- Spermacoce longiseta (M.Martens & Galeotti) Hemsl.
- Spermacoce loretiana (E.L.Cabral) Govaerts

== M ==
- Spermacoce macrantha Reinw. ex Korth.
- Spermacoce macrocephala (Standl. & Steyerm.) Govaerts
- Spermacoce malabarica (Sivar. & Manilal) Sivar., R.V.Nair & Kunju
- Spermacoce malacophylla (K.Schum.) Govaerts
- Spermacoce manikensis Dessein
- Spermacoce manillensis Kuntze
- Spermacoce marginata Benth.
- Spermacoce marticrovettiana (E.L.Cabral) Govaerts
- Spermacoce matanzasia (Urb.) Borhidi
- Spermacoce melochioides (Standl.) Govaerts
- Spermacoce membranacea R.Br. ex Benth.
- Spermacoce meyeniana Walp.
- Spermacoce microcephala A.Rich.
- Spermacoce milnei Verdc.
- Spermacoce minutiflora (K.Schum.) Verdc.
- Spermacoce mitracarpoides Miq.
- Spermacoce multibracteata (E.L.Cabral & Bacigalupo) ined.
- Spermacoce multicaulis Benth.
- Spermacoce multiflora (DC.) Delprete

== N ==
- Spermacoce nana Roxb.
- Spermacoce natalensis Hochst.
- Spermacoce neesiana Schult. & Schult.f.
- Spermacoce nelidae (E.L.Cabral) Govaerts
- Spermacoce neohispida Govaerts
- Spermacoce neotenuis Govaerts
- Spermacoce neoterminalis Govaerts
- Spermacoce nesiotica (B.L.Rob.) G.A.Levin
- Spermacoce nigricans Herter
- Spermacoce noronhensis (Sucre) Govaerts

== O ==
- Spermacoce obscura DC.
- Spermacoce occidentalis Harwood
- Spermacoce occultiseta Harwood
- Spermacoce octodon (Hepper) Hakki
- Spermacoce ocymifolia Willd.
- Spermacoce ocymoides Burm.f.
- Spermacoce oligantha Urb.
- Spermacoce omissa J.R.Clarkson
- Spermacoce orinocensis Willd.
- Spermacoce ostenii (Standl.) E.L.Cabral & Florentín
- Spermacoce ovalifolia (M.Martens & Galeotti) Hemsl.

== P ==
- Spermacoce paganuccii E.L.Cabral & Bacigalupo
- Spermacoce paolii (Chiov.) Verdc.
- Spermacoce papuana F.Muell.
- Spermacoce paraensis (Bacigalupo & E.L.Cabral) Delprete
- Spermacoce paranaensis (E.L.Cabral & Bacigalupo) Delprete
- Spermacoce parviceps (Ridl.) I.M.Turner
- Spermacoce pauciflora Vell.
- Spermacoce paulista (E.L.Cabral & Bacigalupo) ined.
- Spermacoce pazensis (E.L.Cabral & Bacigalupo) ined.
- Spermacoce perangusta (S.Moore) Delprete
- Spermacoce perennis Verdc.
- Spermacoce perpusilla (Hook.f.) Kuntze
- Spermacoce pessima Harwood
- Spermacoce petraea (Pires-O'Brien) Govaerts
- Spermacoce phaeosperma Harwood
- Spermacoce phalloides Harwood
- Spermacoce phyteuma Schweinf. ex Hiern
- Spermacoce phyteumoides Verdc.
- Spermacoce pilifera Bacigalupo
- Spermacoce pilulifera (Ridl.) I.M.Turner
- Spermacoce platyloba Harwood
- Spermacoce poaya A.St.-Hil.
- Spermacoce pogostoma Benth.
- Spermacoce pohliana Govaerts
- Spermacoce polyphylla Vell.
- Spermacoce princeae (K.Schum.) Verdc.
- Spermacoce prostrata Aubl.
- Spermacoce protrusa Harwood
- Spermacoce pulchristipula (Bremek.) Delprete
- Spermacoce pumila (Span.) Boerl.
- Spermacoce pumilio (Standl.) Govaerts
- Spermacoce pusilla Wall.

== Q ==
- Spermacoce quadrifaria (E.L.Cabral) Govaerts
- Spermacoce quadrisulcata (Bremek.) Verdc.

== R ==
- Spermacoce radiata (DC.) Sieber ex Hiern
- Spermacoce redacta Harwood
- Spermacoce reflexa (J.H.Kirkbr.) Govaerts
- Spermacoce remota Lam.
- Spermacoce resinosula Harwood
- Spermacoce reticulata Harwood
- Spermacoce retitesta Harwood
- Spermacoce riparia Cham. & Schltdl.
- Spermacoce rosea (Urb.) Alain
- Spermacoce rosmarinifolia (E.L.Cabral & Bacigalupo) ined.
- Spermacoce rotundifolia (Andersson) Fosberg
- Spermacoce rubescens (Colla) P.L.R.Moraes & De Smedt
- Spermacoce rubricaulis C.Wright
- Spermacoce ruelliae DC.
- Spermacoce runkii (K.Schum.) Kuntze
- Spermacoce rupicola Harwood

== S ==
- Spermacoce samfya Verdc.
- Spermacoce santacruciana (Bacigalupo & E.L.Cabral) ined.
- Spermacoce savannarum (Britton) Howard
- Spermacoce scaberrima Blume
- Spermacoce scabiosoides (Cham. & Schltdl.) Kuntze
- Spermacoce scabrisina Harwood
- Spermacoce schlechteri K.Schum. ex Verdc.
- Spermacoce schumanniana (Taub. ex Ule) Govaerts
- Spermacoce schumannii (Standl. ex Bacigalupo) Delprete
- Spermacoce scortechinii Gand.
- Spermacoce semiamplexicaulis (E.L.Cabral) Delprete
- Spermacoce semierecta Roxb.
- Spermacoce senensis (Klotzsch) Hiern
- Spermacoce serpyllifolia Willd.
- Spermacoce setidens (Miq.) Boerl.
- Spermacoce sexangularis Aubl.
- Spermacoce siberiana (E.L.Cabral & R.M.Salas) Govaerts
- Spermacoce simplicicaulis (K.Schum. ex Sucre) Govaerts
- Spermacoce sociata (Span.) Boerl.
- Spermacoce somalica (K.Schum.) Govaerts
- Spermacoce spermacocina (K.Schum.) Bridson & Puff
- Spermacoce sphaerostigma (A.Rich.) Oliv.
- Spermacoce spruceana Kuntze
- Spermacoce squamosa (C.Wright ex Griseb.) Kuntze
- Spermacoce stachydea DC.
- Spermacoce stenophylla F.Muell.
- Spermacoce stigmatosa Harwood
- Spermacoce stipularis Dessein
- Spermacoce strumpfioides (C.Wright ex Griseb.) C.Wright
- Spermacoce suaveolens (G.Mey.) Kuntze
- Spermacoce suberecta (Hook.f.) Kuntze
- Spermacoce subvulgata (K.Schum.) J.G.García
- Spermacoce sulcata (Bacigalupo) ined.
- Spermacoce suprahila Harwood

== T ==
- Spermacoce taylorii Verdc.
- Spermacoce tectanthera Harwood
- Spermacoce tenuior L.
- Spermacoce tenuissima Hiern
- Spermacoce terminaliflora R.D.Good
- Spermacoce tetraquetra A.Rich.
- Spermacoce thymifolia (Griseb.) Kuntze
- Spermacoce thymocephala (Griseb.) C.Wright
- Spermacoce thymoidea (Hiern) Verdc.
- Spermacoce tocantinsiana (E.L.Cabral & Bacigalupo) Delprete
- Spermacoce trichosiphonia Harwood

== U ==
- Spermacoce uniseta F.M.Bailey

== V ==
- Spermacoce valens (Standl.) Govaerts
- Spermacoce velascoana (E.L.Cabral, R.M.Salas & J.D.Soto) Govaerts
- Spermacoce verticillata L.
- Spermacoce viridiflora (Hassl.) Govaerts
- Spermacoce vulpina (Standl.) Govaerts

== W ==
- Spermacoce warmingii (K.Schum.) Kuntze
- Spermacoce weygaertii Govaerts
- Spermacoce wunschmannii (K.Schum.) Kuntze
- Spermacoce wurdackii (Steyerm.) Govaerts

== X ==
- Spermacoce xanthophylla (Bremek.) Govaerts

== Z ==
- Spermacoce zollingeriana (Miq.) Boerl.
