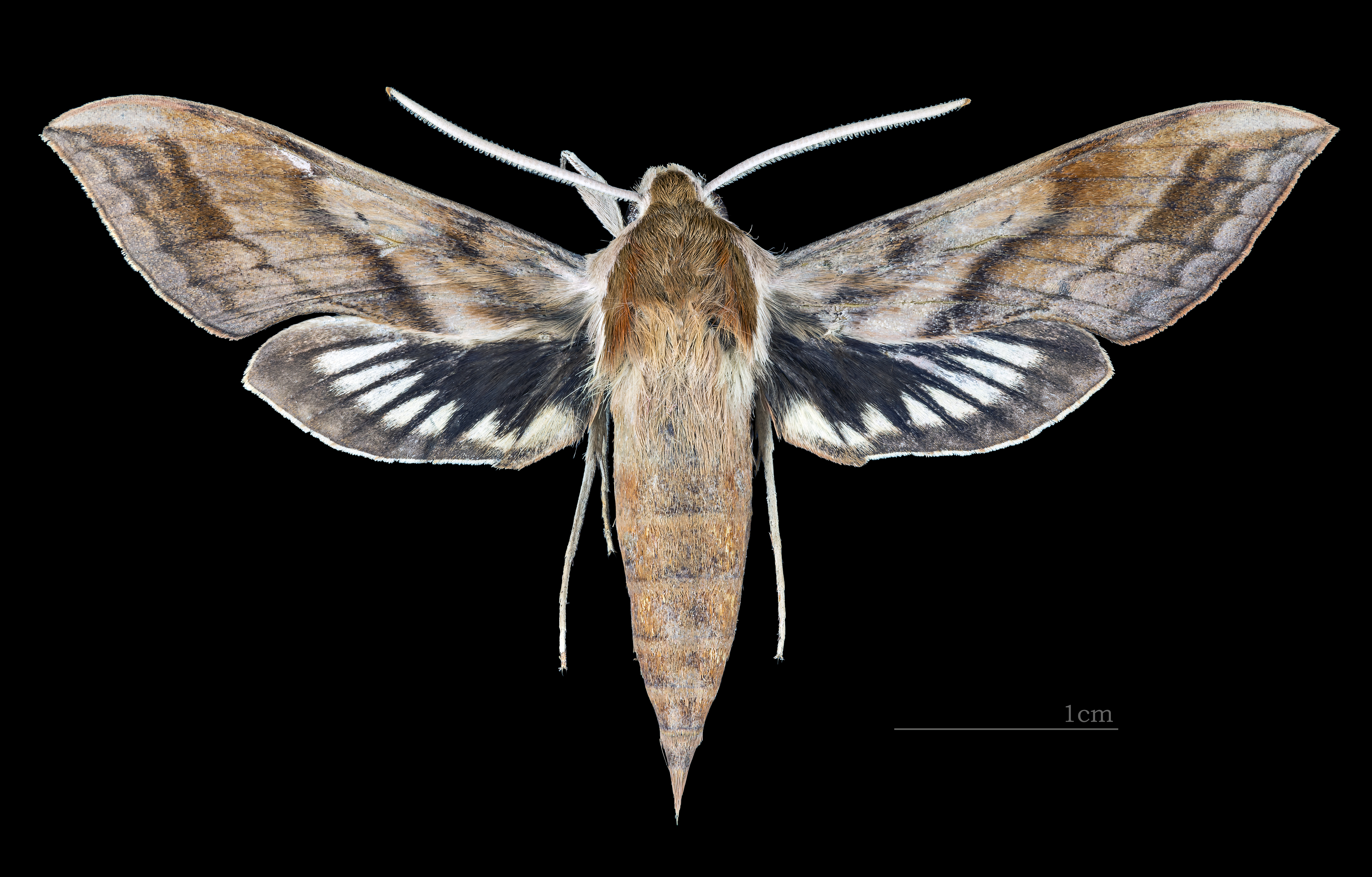
- Xylophanes norfolki male dorsal
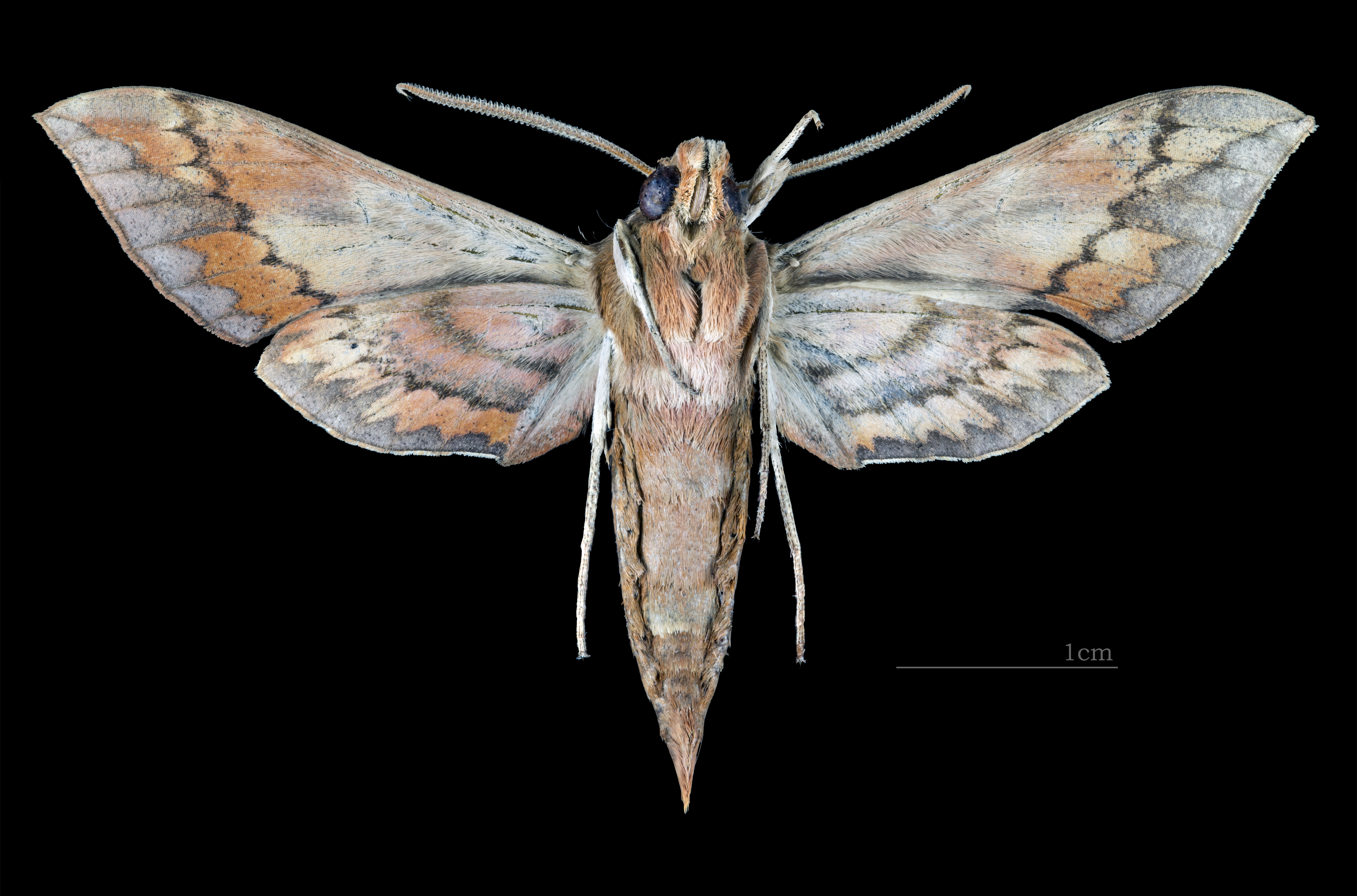
- Xylophanes norfolki male ventral

Scientific classification
- Domain: Eukaryota
- Kingdom: Animalia
- Phylum: Arthropoda
- Class: Insecta
- Order: Lepidoptera
- Family: Sphingidae
- Genus: Xylophanes
- Species: X. norfolki

Binomial name
- Xylophanes norfolki Kernbach, 1962

= Xylophanes norfolki =

Species of moth

Xylophanes norfolki is a moth of the family Sphingidae. It is known from the Galapagos Islands.

It is similar to Xylophanes tersa and related species, but the pattern and form of the forewing upperside is different. The underside of the abdomen is purplish-brown, while the forewing upperside has a dark brown ground colour and the forewing and hindwing underside ground colour is dark orange. There are pale yellow spots on the hindwing upperside, while the ground colour dark orange.

Adults are on wing in February and June and possibly again from September to October.

The larvae feed on Psychotria rufipes.
