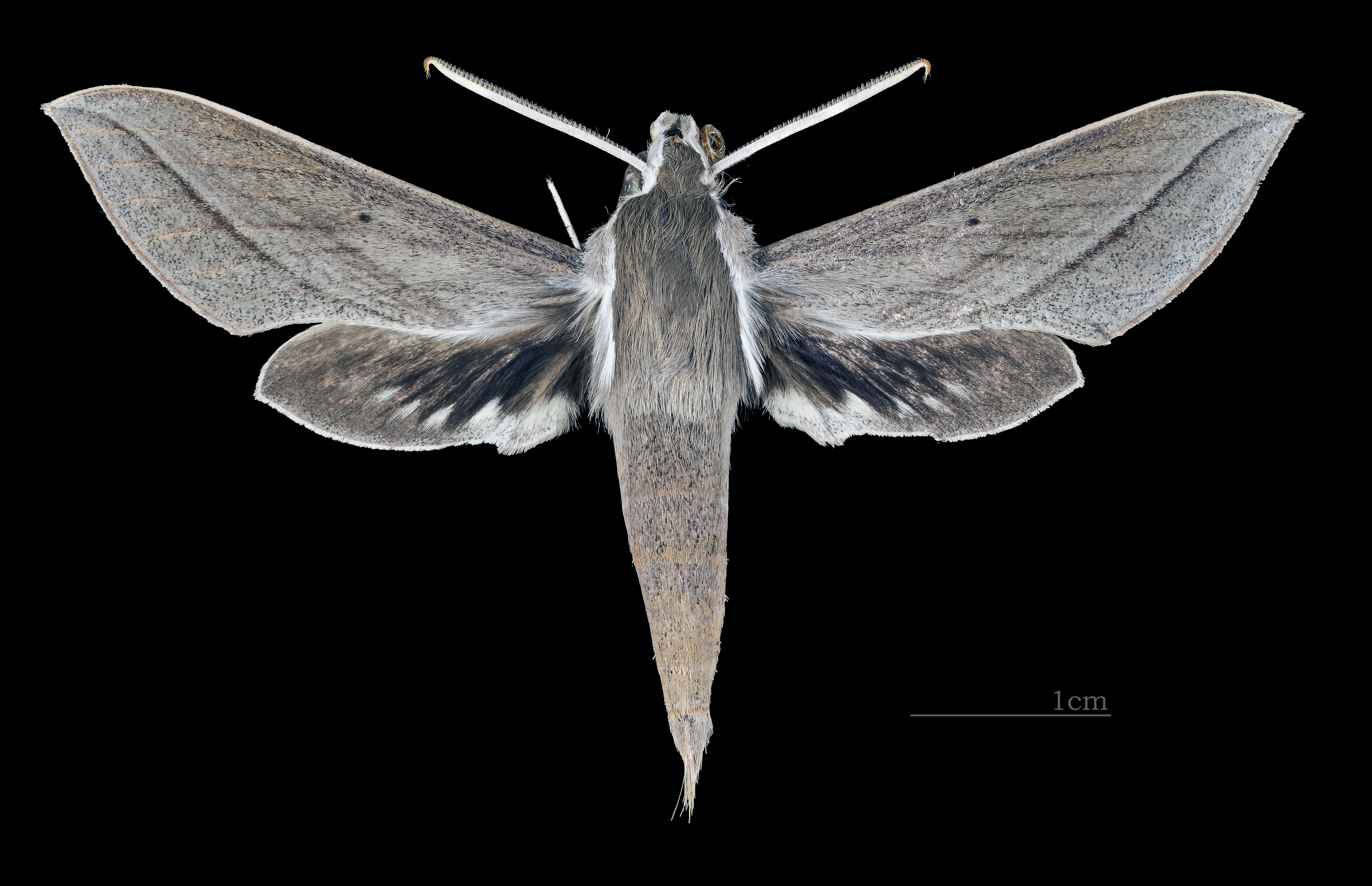
- Male, dorsal view
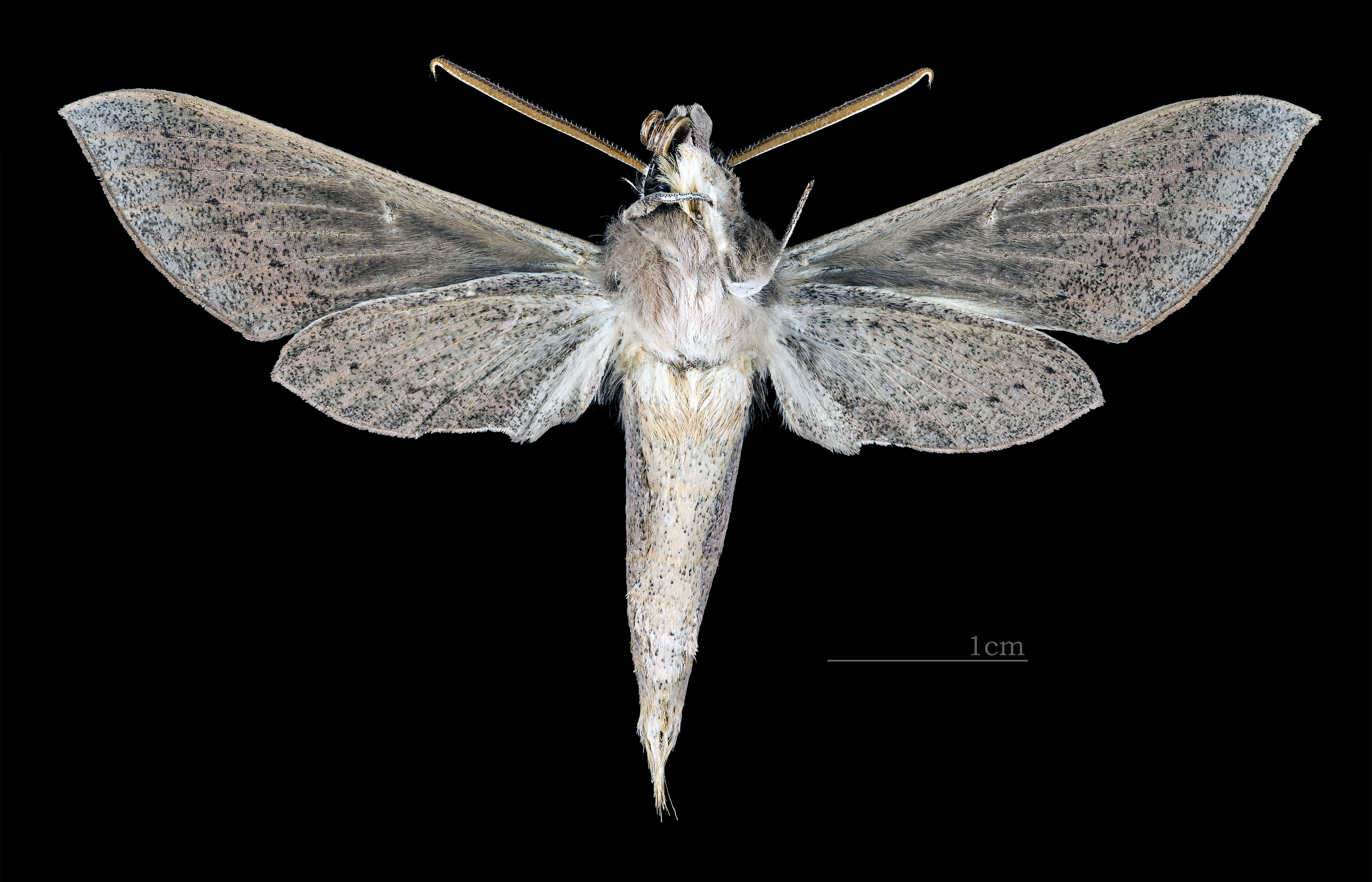
- Male, ventral view

Scientific classification
- Domain: Eukaryota
- Kingdom: Animalia
- Phylum: Arthropoda
- Class: Insecta
- Order: Lepidoptera
- Family: Sphingidae
- Genus: Xylophanes
- Species: X. suana

Binomial name
- Xylophanes suana (H. Druce, 1889)

Synonyms
- Choerocampa suana H. Druce, 1889

= Xylophanes suana =

Species of moth

Xylophanes suana is a moth of the family Sphingidae first described by Herbert Druce in 1889.

== Distribution ==
It is known from the Bahamas.

== Description ==
It is similar to Xylophanes tersa tersa but the upperside of the body and forewing is more uniform ash grey, whereas the abdomen is lacking the golden-yellow lateral stripes and the forewings are less elongate. Furthermore, the abdominal tergites have weaker spines. The forewing pattern is generally very uniform. Only the discal spot, the basal section of the first postmedian line and the fourth postmedian line are standing out from the greyish-brown ground colour in most specimens. The pale yellow spots of the median band on the hindwing upperside are fewer and smaller than in Xylophanes tersa tersa and sometimes flushed with pink.

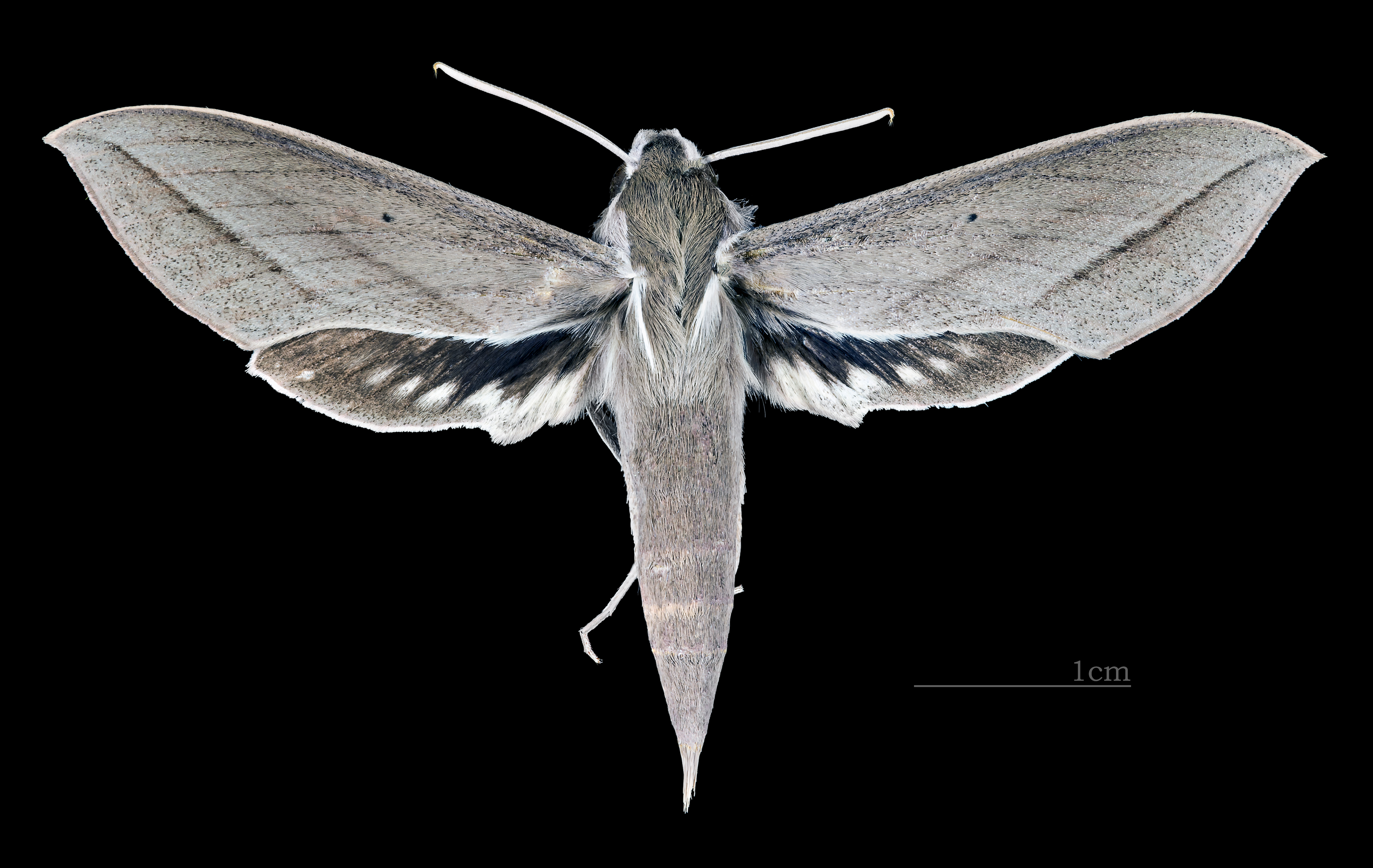
Female dorsal

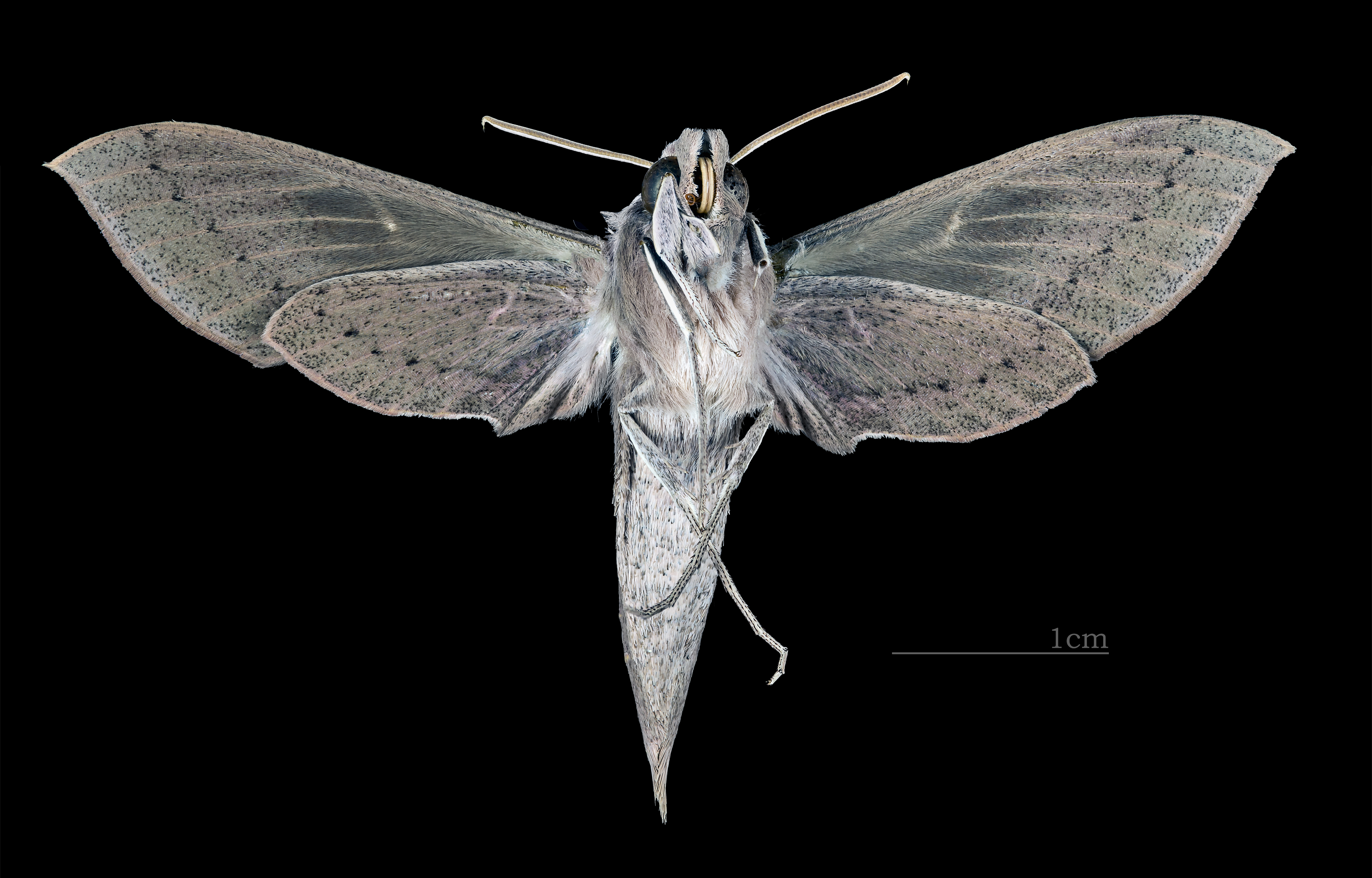
Female ventral

== Biology ==
Adults are probably on wing year-round.

The larvae possibly feed on Psychotria panamensis, Psychotria nervosa and Pavonia guanacastensis.
