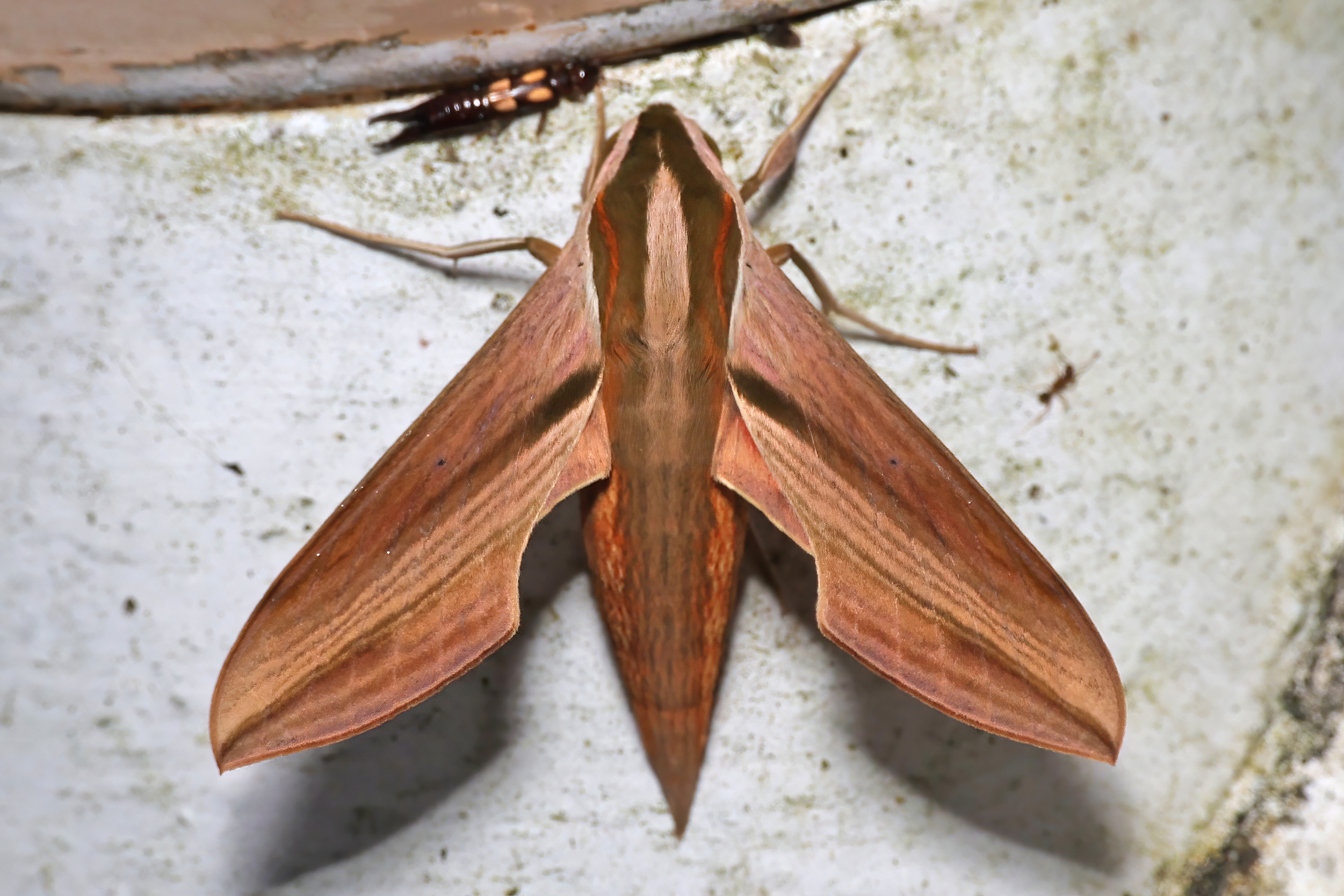
- in Sri Lanka

Scientific classification
- Kingdom: Animalia
- Phylum: Arthropoda
- Clade: Pancrustacea
- Class: Insecta
- Order: Lepidoptera
- Family: Sphingidae
- Genus: Hippotion
- Species: H. rosetta

Binomial name
- Hippotion rosetta (C. Swinhoe, 1892)

Synonyms
- Choerocampa rosetta C. Swinhoe, 1892; Hippotion depictum Dupont, 1941

= Hippotion rosetta =

Species of moth

Hippotion rosetta, or Swinhoe's striated hawkmoth, is a species of sphingid moth in the family Sphingidae. The species was first described by Charles Swinhoe in 1892.

== Distribution ==
It is found from southern Pakistan, India, the Maldives and Sri Lanka, east across Thailand, southern China and Taiwan to the Ryukyu Archipelago and the Philippines, then south across south-east Asia to the Andaman Islands, eastern Indonesia, the Solomon Islands and the Torres Strait of New Guinea.

== Description ==
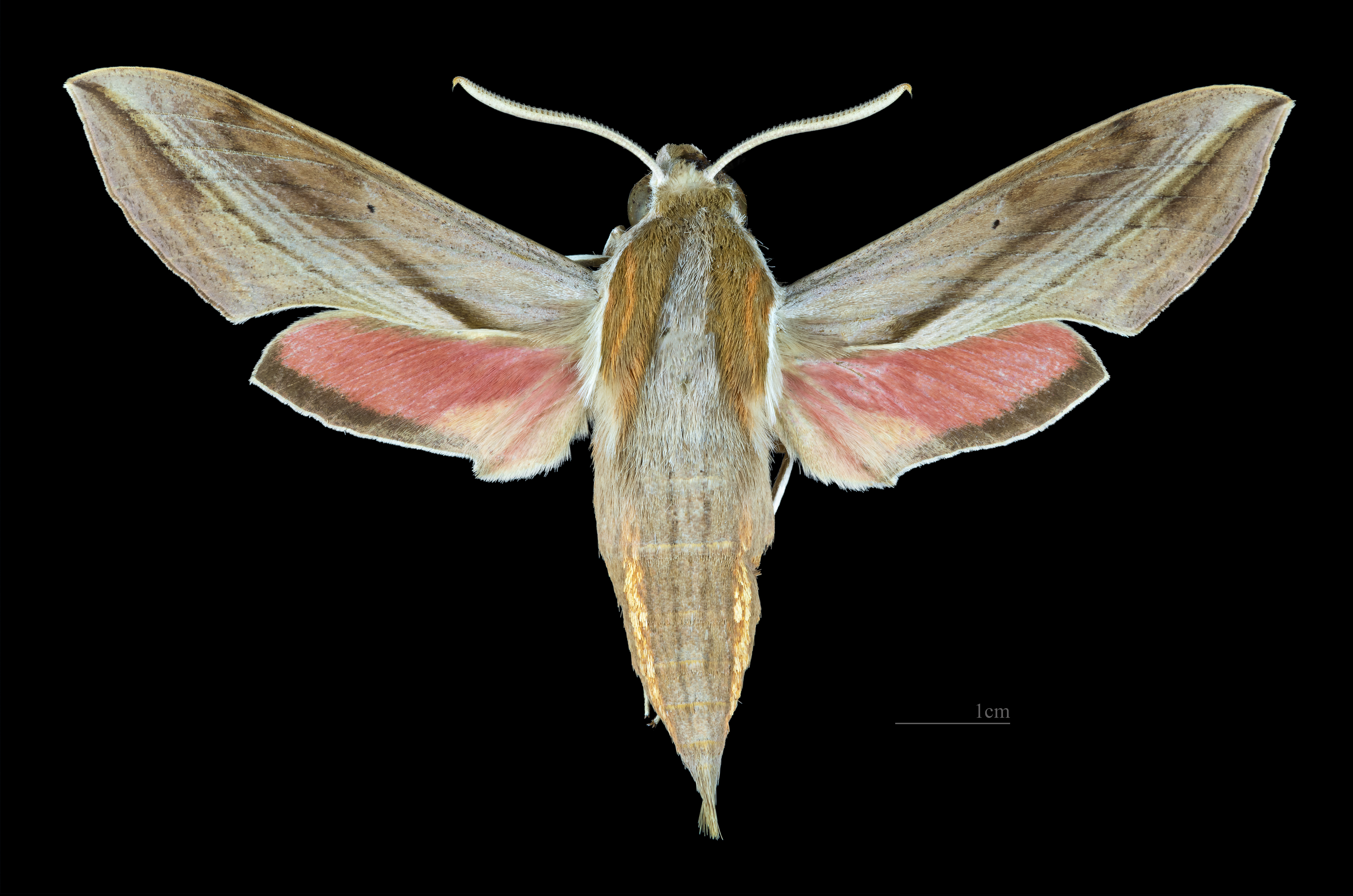
Male dorsal view

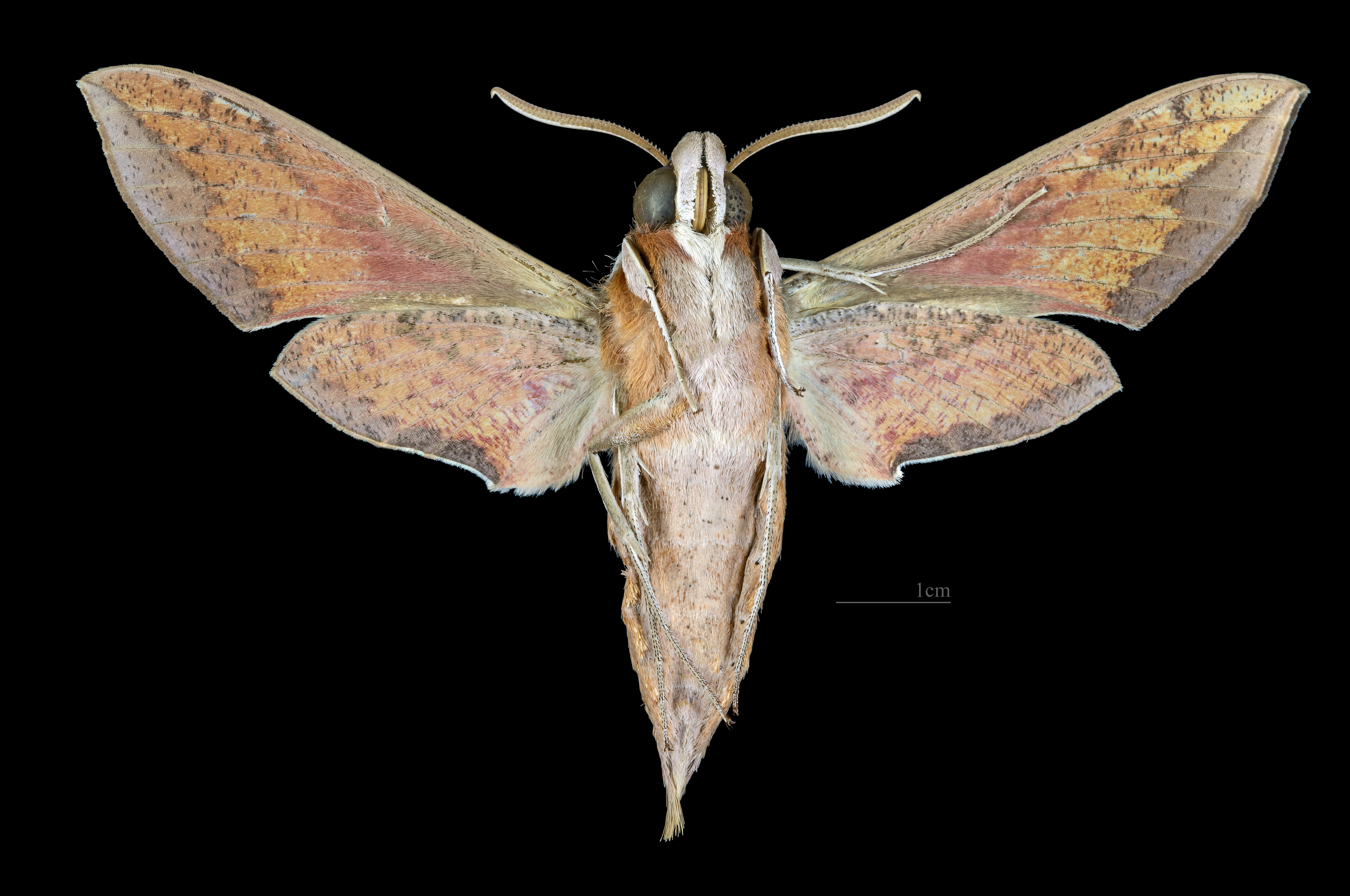
Male ventral view

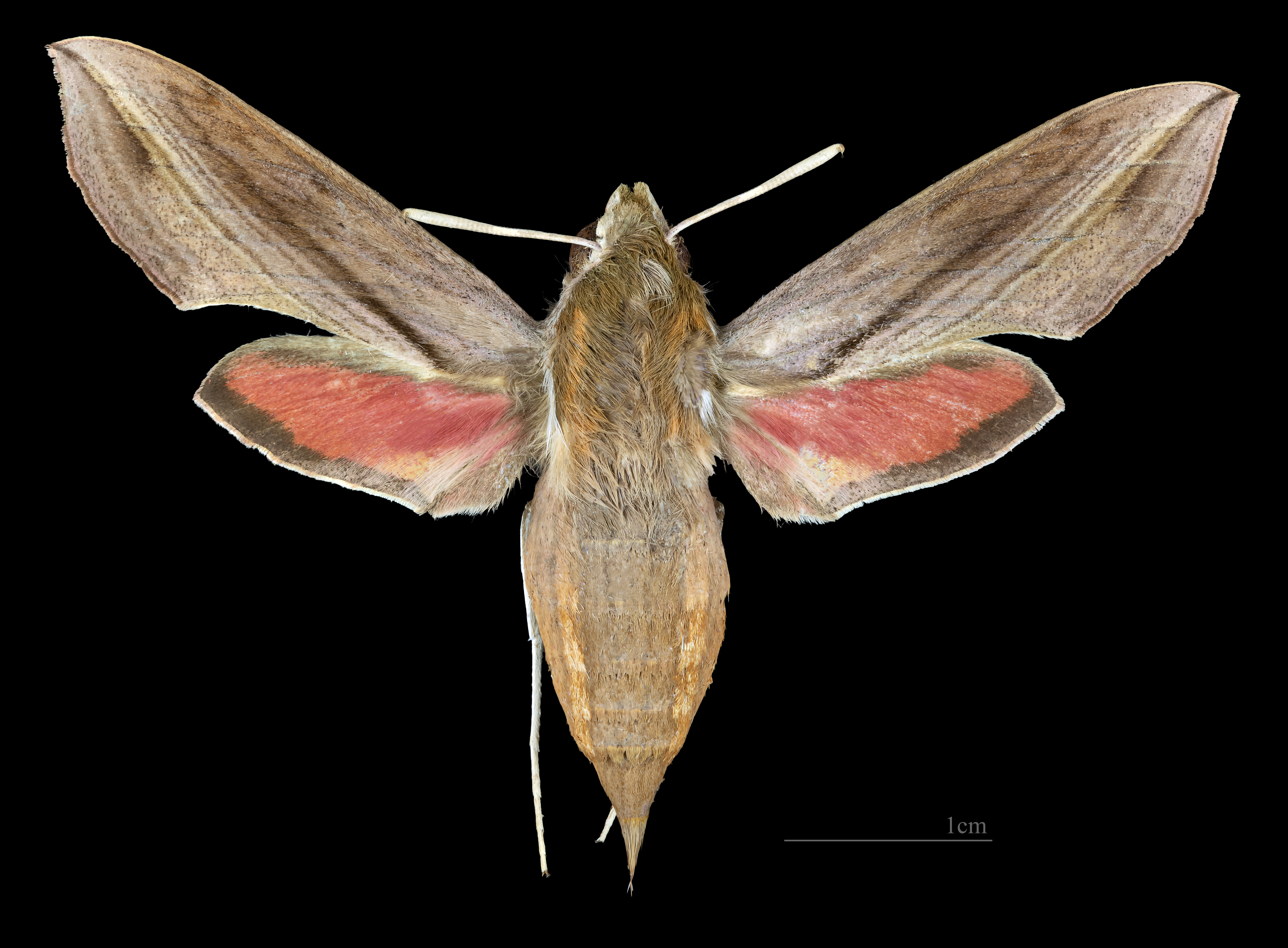
Female dorsal view

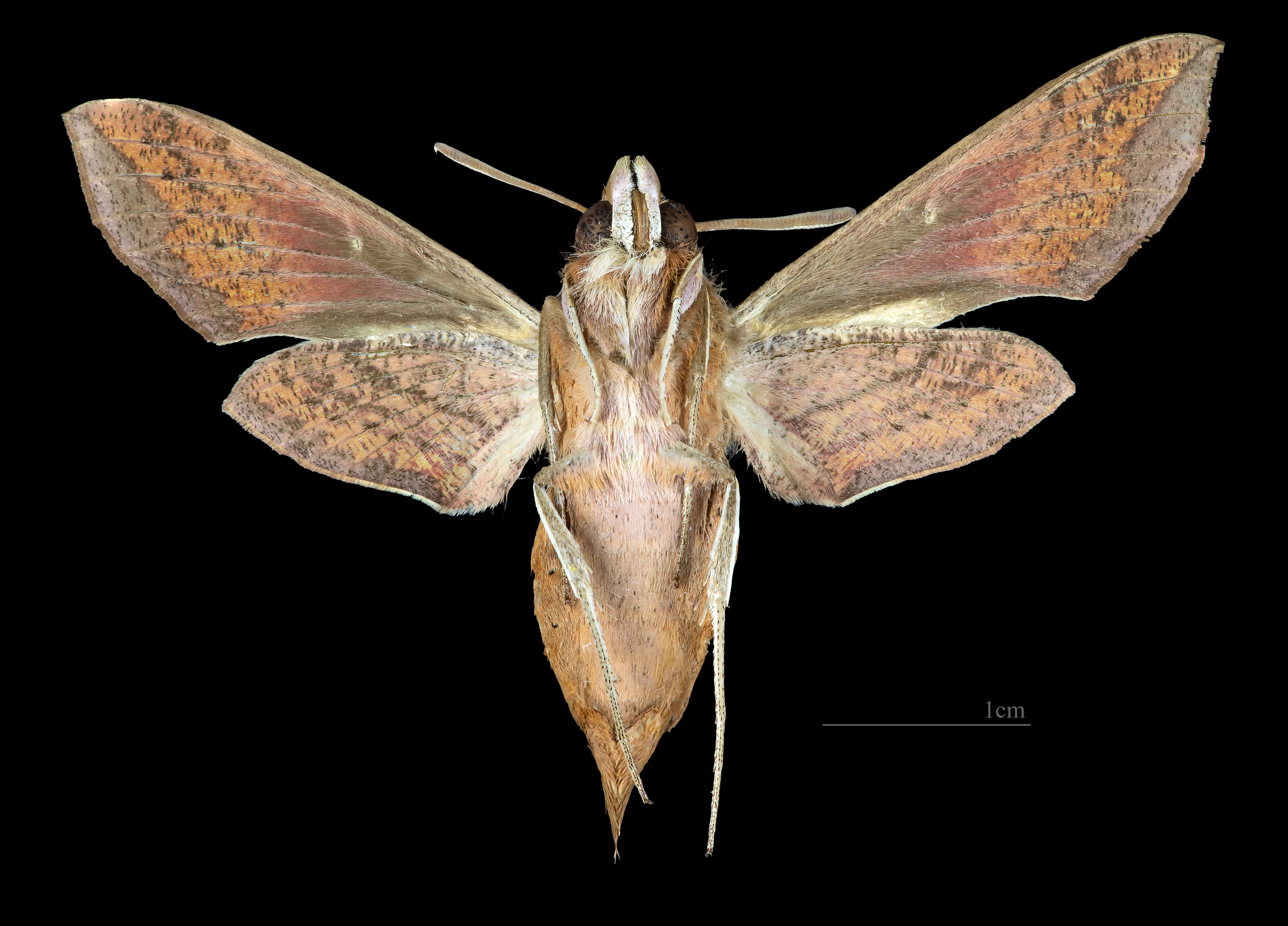
Female ventral view

== Biology ==
There are several generations per year in Hong Kong, with adults on wing from March to November, with peaks in late March, May and early October.

Larvae have been recorded on Borreria, Morinda citrifolia and Morinda umbellata, as well as Pentas lanceolata.

== See also ==
- Protambulyx strigilis – Species of moth
- Xylophanes tersa – Species of moth
