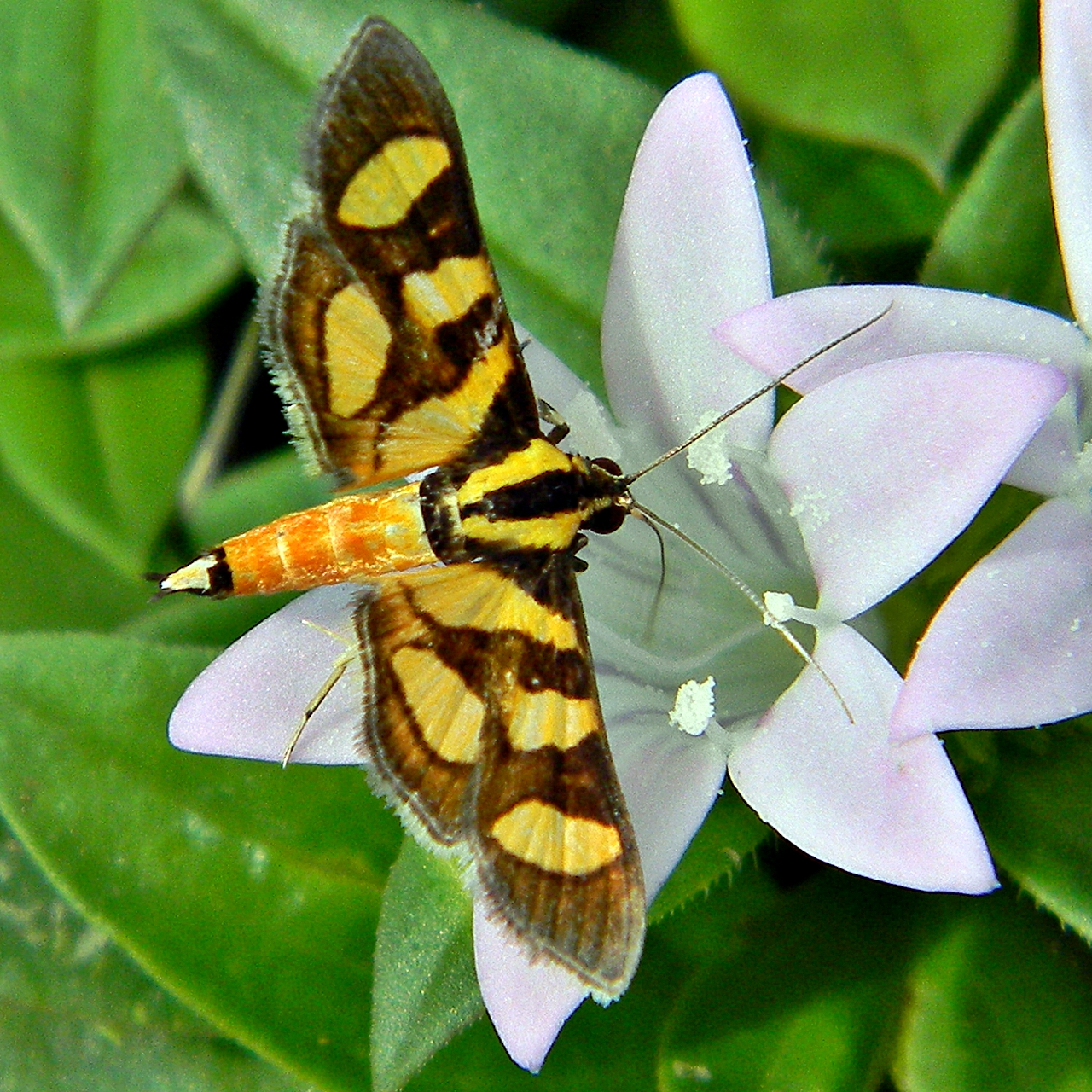

Scientific classification
- Kingdom: Animalia
- Phylum: Arthropoda
- Class: Insecta
- Order: Lepidoptera
- Family: Crambidae
- Genus: Syngamia
- Species: S. florella

Binomial name
- Syngamia florella (Stoll in Cramer & Stoll, 1781)

Synonyms
- Tinea florella Stoll in Cramer & Stoll, 1781; Anania quinqualis Hübner, 1823; Anania quisqualis; Syngamia florellalis Guenée, 1854

= Syngamia florella =

Species of moth

Syngamia florella, the orange-spotted flower moth or red waisted florella moth, is a moth of the family Crambidae. It was described by Caspar Stoll in 1781. It is found from South Carolina to Florida and from Arkansas to Texas, south to the West Indies and through Mexico to Argentina. It is also found on Bermuda.

The wingspan is about 15 mm. They are on wing from July to December in most of the range, but have only been recorded from September to December in Florida.

The larvae feed on Borreria brachysepala, Spermacoce laevis and Spermacoce tetraquetra.
