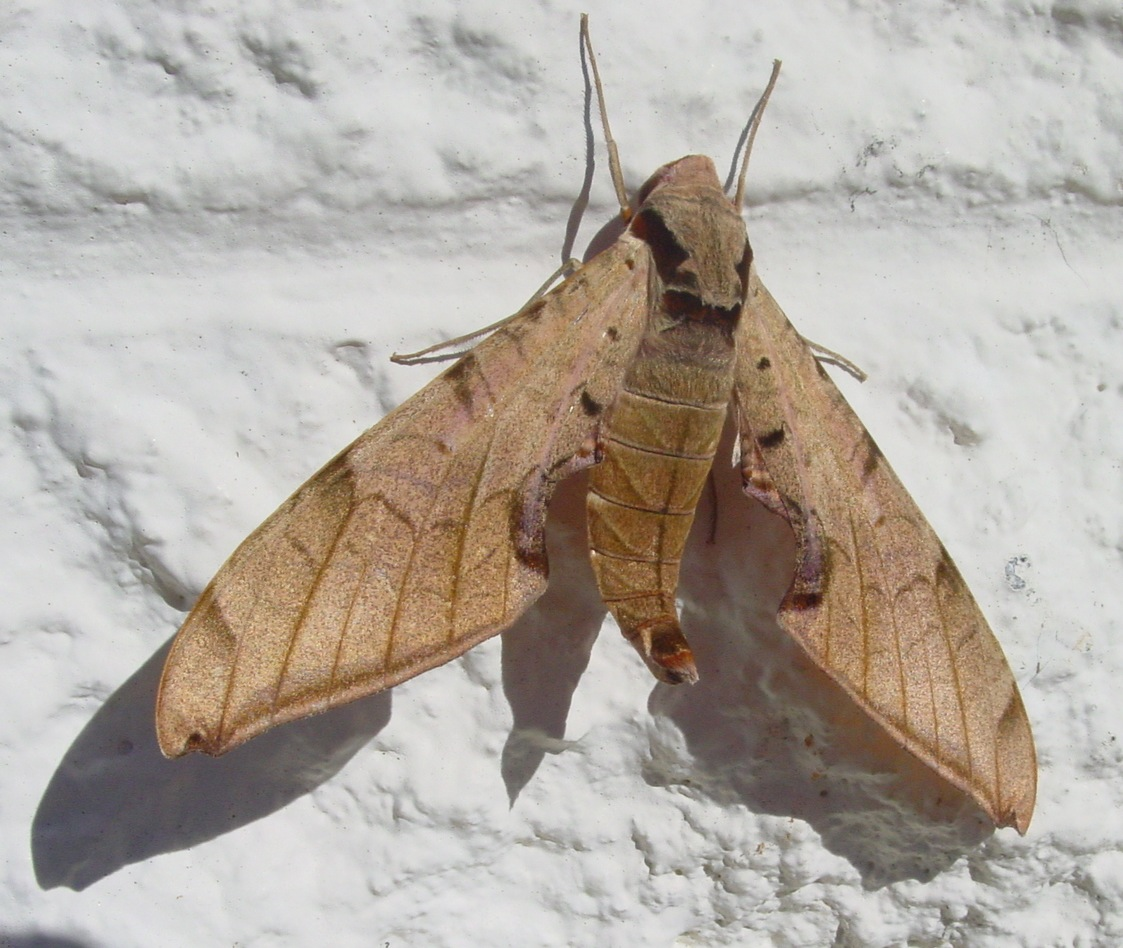

Scientific classification
- Kingdom: Animalia
- Phylum: Arthropoda
- Clade: Pancrustacea
- Class: Insecta
- Order: Lepidoptera
- Family: Sphingidae
- Genus: Protambulyx
- Species: P. strigilis

Binomial name
- Protambulyx strigilis (Linnaeus, 1771)

Synonyms
- Sphinx strigilis Linnaeus, 1771; Ambulyx strigiles rubripennis Butler, 1876; Protambulyx strigilis portoricensis Clark, 1931; Protambulyx strigilis turarem Lichy, 1943

= Protambulyx strigilis =

Streaked sphinx

Species of moth

Protambulyx strigilis, the streaked sphinx, is a moth of the family Sphingidae prevalent in the Americas from Florida to Central and South America. The species was first described by Carl Linnaeus in 1771.

== Distribution ==
It is known from tropical and subtropical lowlands in Florida and throughout Central America and the West Indies south to Colombia, Ecuador, Paraguay, Peru, Bolivia, Venezuela, Guyana, Suriname, French Guiana, Brazil and Argentina.

== Description ==
The wingspan is 108–134 mm. Adults are on wing in March and from June to July in Florida, year round in Costa Rica, from April to August and October to December in Bolivia, April in Brazil and June in Peru.

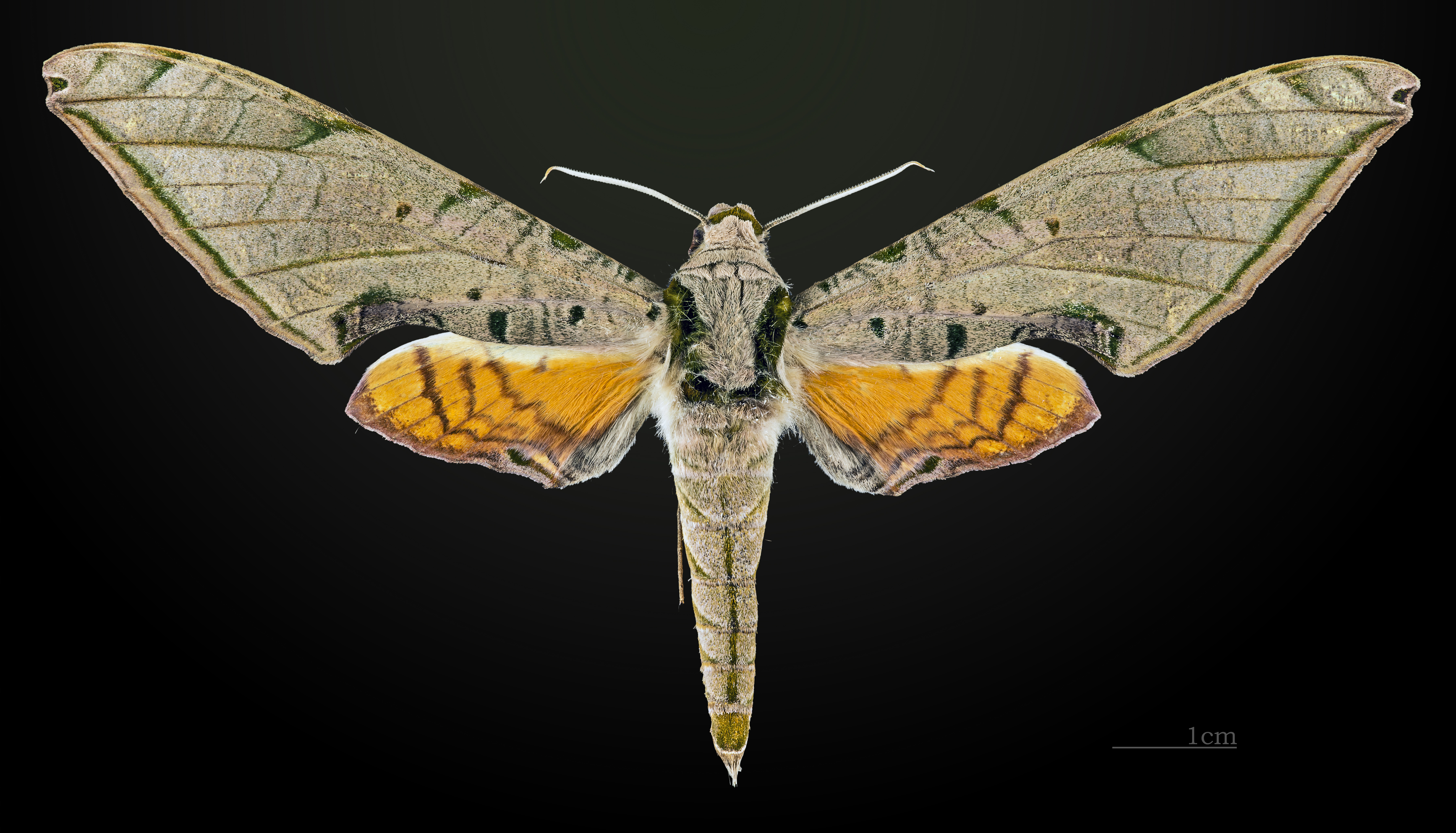
Male dorsal view

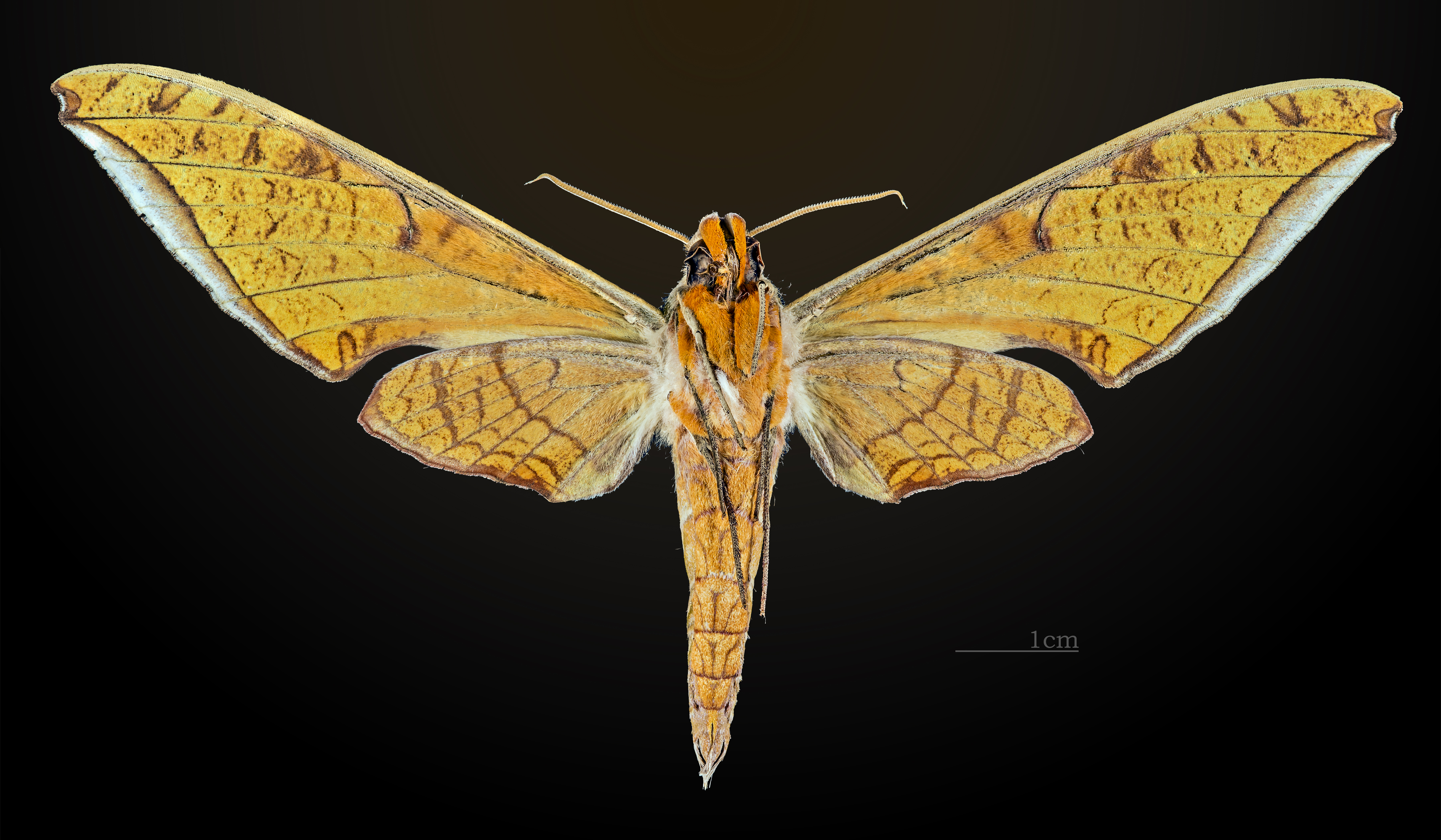
Male ventral view

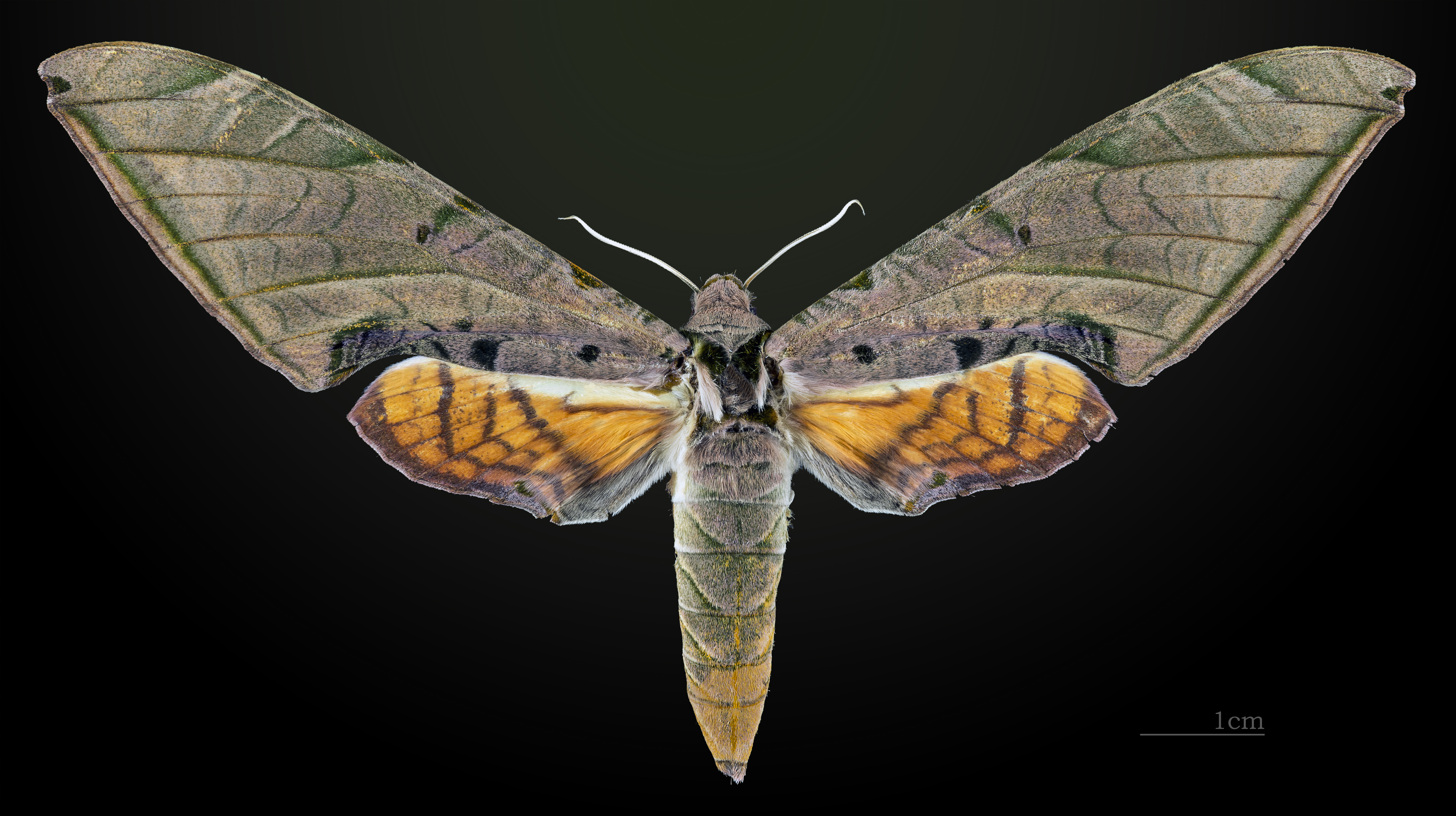
Female dorsal view

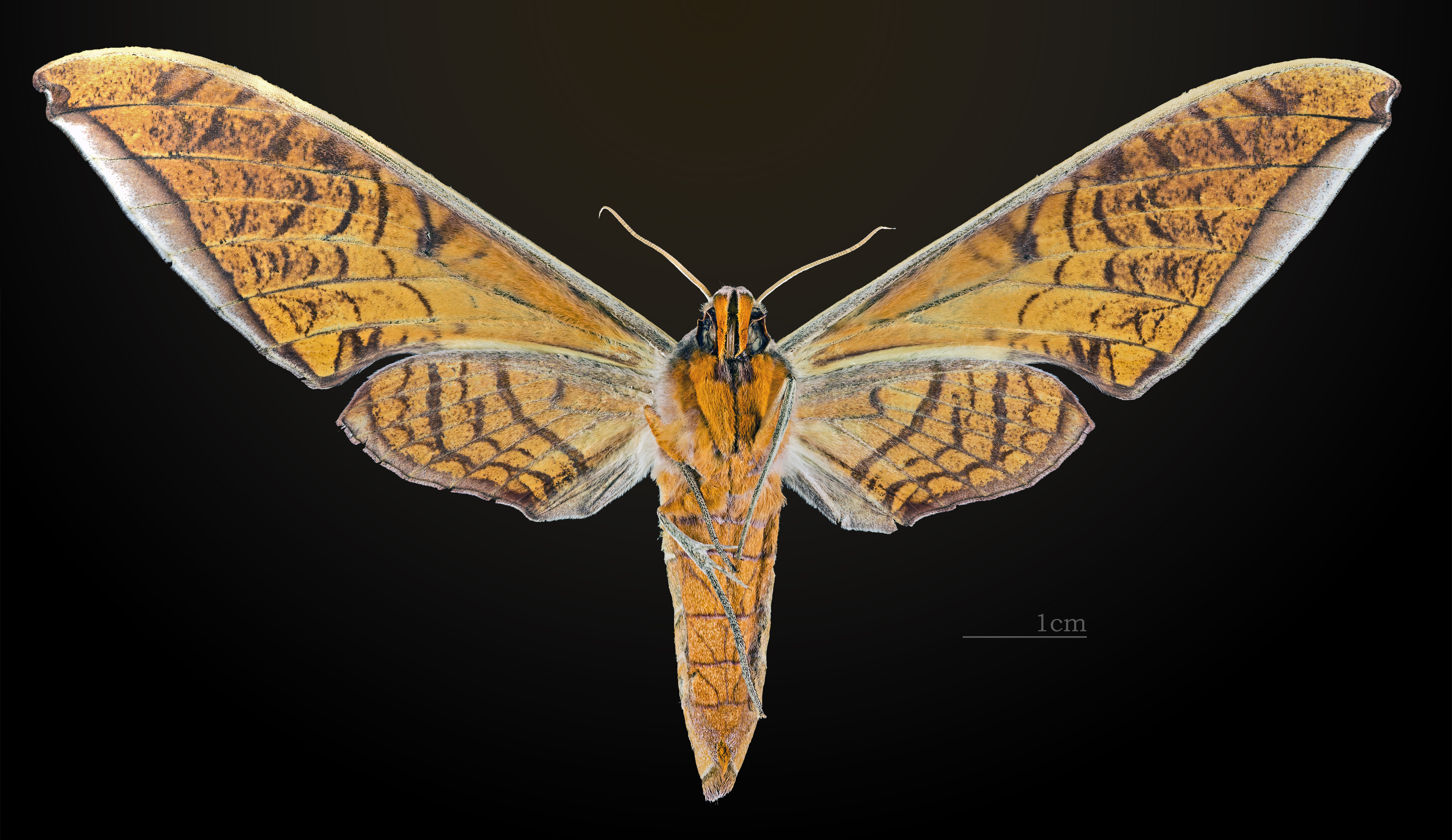
Female ventral view

== Habitat and cycle ==
The larvae have been recorded feeding on Spondias dulcis, S. mombin, S. purpurea, S. cytherea, Astronium graveolens, Anacardium occidentale, Comocladia dodonea, C. dentata, Metopium toxiferum, Simarouba glauca, S. amara, Erythroxylum havanense, Eupatorium villosum, Lycopersicon species, Sambucus australis and Schinus terebinthifolius.

== See also ==
- Hippotion rosetta – Species of moth
- Xylophanes tersa – Species of moth
