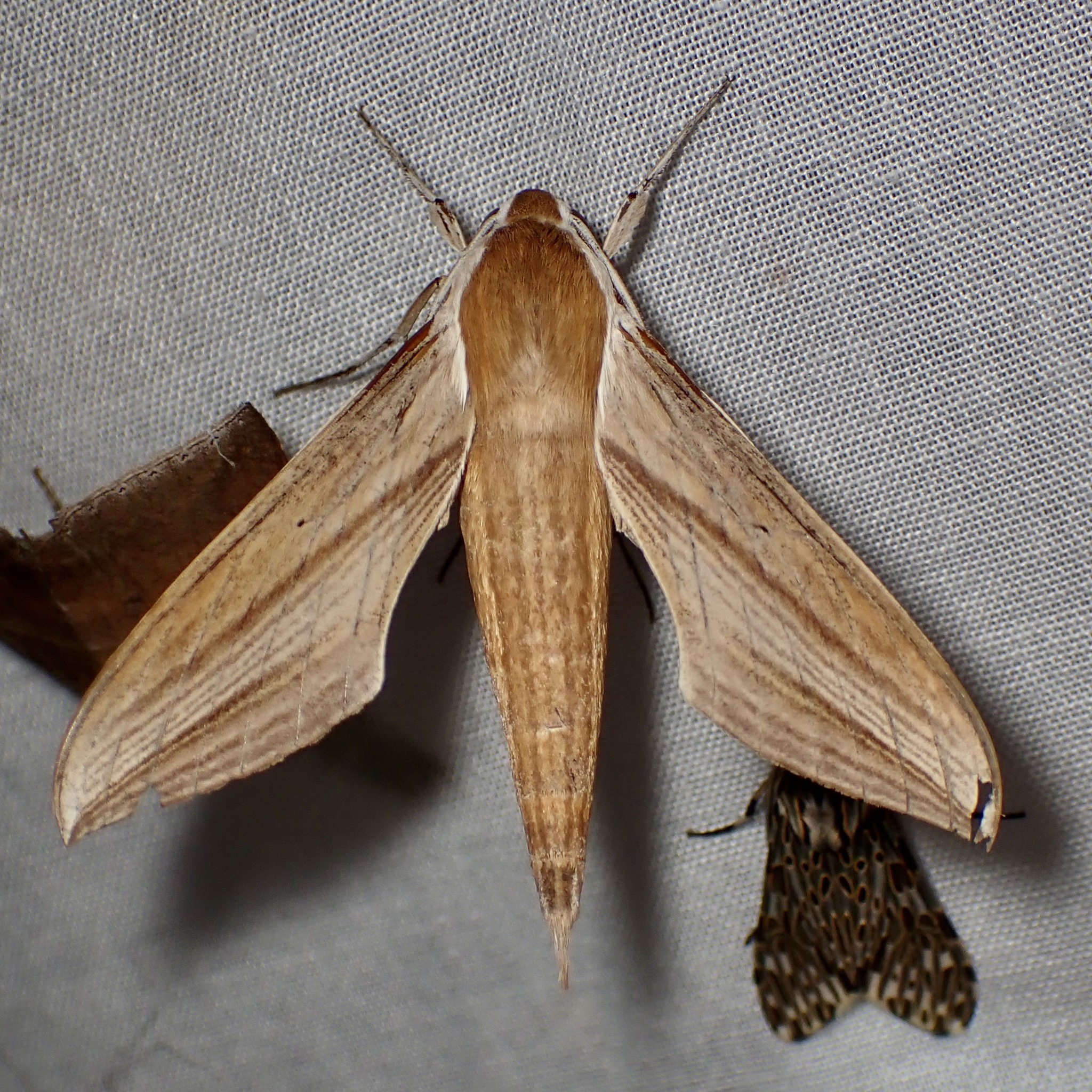

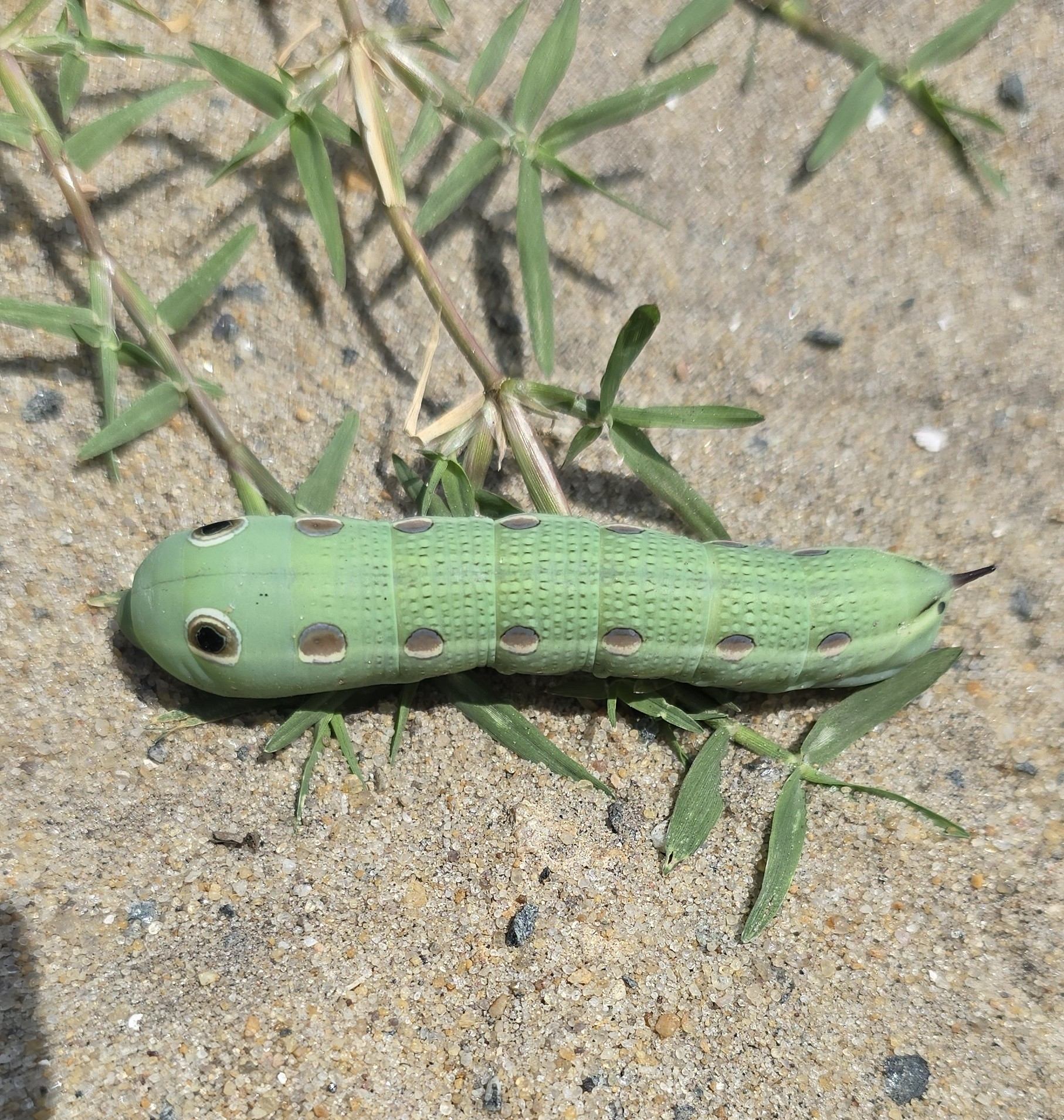

Scientific classification
- Kingdom: Animalia
- Phylum: Arthropoda
- Clade: Pancrustacea
- Class: Insecta
- Order: Lepidoptera
- Family: Sphingidae
- Genus: Xylophanes
- Species: X. tersa

Binomial name
- Xylophanes tersa (Linnaeus, 1771)

Synonyms
- Sphinx tersa Linnaeus, 1771; Xylophanes tersa cubensis Gehlen, 1941; Xylophanes tersa tristis (Closs, 1918)

= Xylophanes tersa =

Tersa sphinx

Species of moth

Xylophanes tersa, the tersa sphinx, is a species of moth of the family Sphingidae. The species was first described by Carl Linnaeus in 1771. It is found from the United States (Massachusetts south to southern Florida, west to Nebraska, New Mexico and southern Arizona), through Mexico, the West Indies and Central America and into parts of South America (including Bolivia, Paraguay, Argentina and Brazil). An occasional stray can be found as far north as Canada.

The larvae feed on Borreria, Catalpa, Manettia, and Pentas species, and Spermacoce glabra, Hamelia patens, Hedyotis nigricans, Heimia salicifolia, Psychotria microdon, Psychotria nervosa, and Inga vera.

== Subspecies ==
- Xylophanes tersa chaconi De Marmels, Clavijo & Chacín, 1996 (Venezuela)
- Xylophanes tersa tersa

== See also ==
- Hippotion rosetta – Species of moth
- Protambulyx strigilis – Species of moth
