= Spermacoce keyensis =

Florida false buttonweed

Scientific classification
- Kingdom: Plantae
- Clade: Tracheophytes
- Clade: Angiosperms
- Clade: Eudicots
- Clade: Asterids
- Order: Gentianales
- Family: Rubiaceae
- Subfamily: Rubioideae
- Tribe: Spermacoceae
- Genus: Spermacoce
- Species: S. keyensis

Binomial name
- Spermacoce keyensis Small

Synonyms
- Spermacoce floridana Urb.; Spermacoce tenuior var. floridana (Urb.) R.W.Long

Species of plant

Spermacoce keyensis, the Florida false buttonweed, is a species of plants in the family Rubiaceae, first discovered in the Florida Keys. It is found in southern Florida, Bahamas, and the extreme southern tip of Texas (Cameron County).
