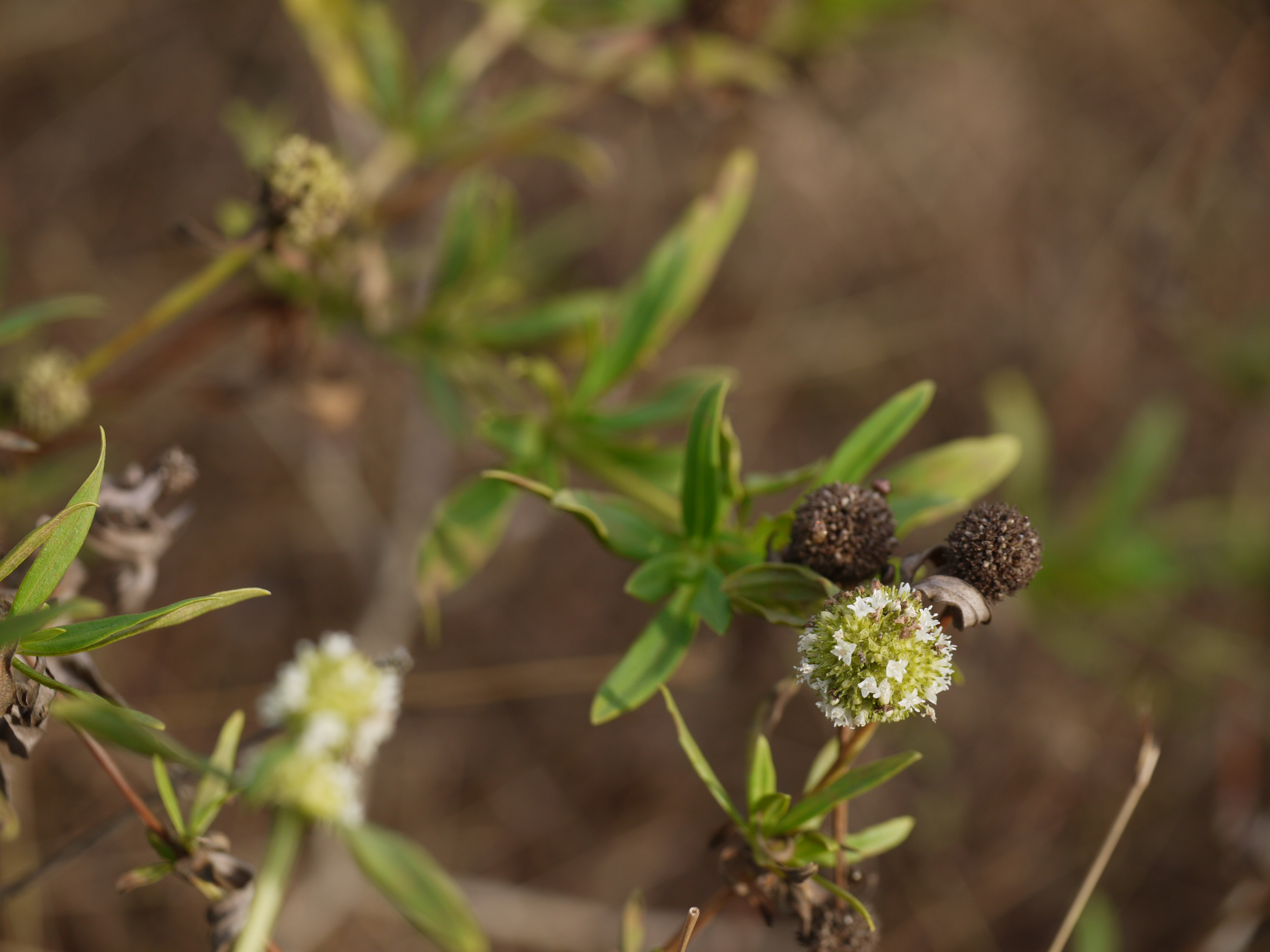

Scientific classification
- Kingdom: Plantae
- Clade: Tracheophytes
- Clade: Angiosperms
- Clade: Eudicots
- Clade: Asterids
- Order: Gentianales
- Family: Rubiaceae
- Genus: Spermacoce
- Species: S. verticillata

Binomial name
- Spermacoce verticillata L.

= Spermacoce verticillata =

Species of plant

Spermacoce verticillata, the shrubby false buttonweed, is a species of plant in the family Rubiaceae.

== See also ==
- Larra bicolor
