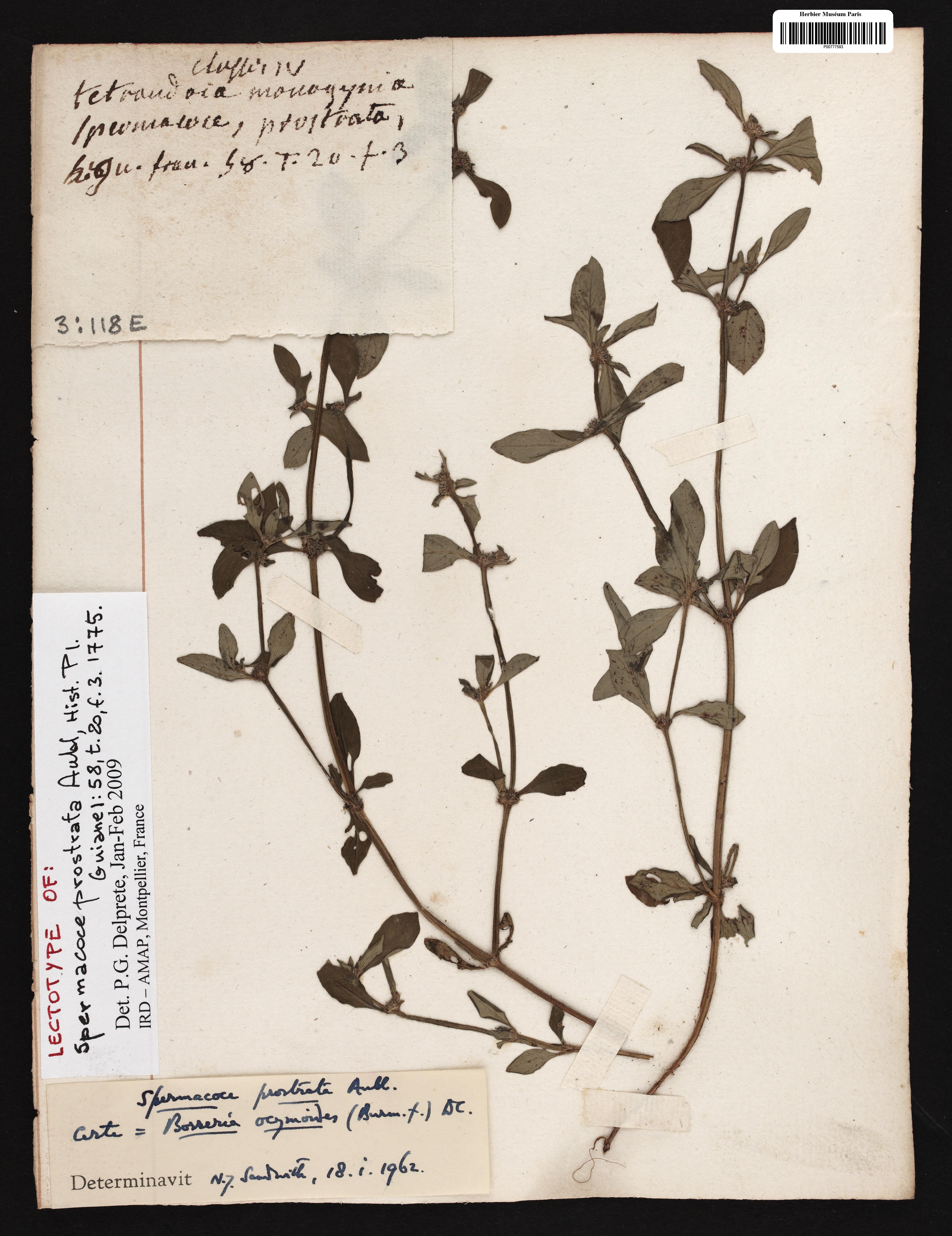

Scientific classification
- Kingdom: Plantae
- Clade: Tracheophytes
- Clade: Angiosperms
- Clade: Eudicots
- Clade: Asterids
- Order: Gentianales
- Family: Rubiaceae
- Subfamily: Rubioideae
- Tribe: Spermacoceae
- Genus: Spermacoce
- Species: S. prostrata

Binomial name
- Spermacoce prostrata Aubl.

= Spermacoce prostrata =

Prostrate false buttonweed

Species of plant

Spermacoce prostrata (prostrate false buttonweed) is a species of plants in the Rubiaceae. In the United States, it is widespread in Florida, with a few isolated populations in Alabama and Mississippi. The species is native to Mexico, Central America, the Caribbean (Bahamas, Cuba, Hispaniola, Puerto Rico, Trinidad, Turks & Caicos, the Lesser Antilles, and the Dutch and Venezuelan Antilles. It is also widespread in South America, found in every country except Chile. The species is reportedly naturalized in Hawaii, China (Hainan, Hong Kong), Japan, Taiwan, Sri Lanka, Thailand and Java.

== Description ==
S. prostrata may reach up to 40 centimeters (approximately 16 inches) in height. Leaves are oppositely arranged, with blades 10 to 35 millimeters (0.4 to 1.4 inches) long. Inflorescence is axillary and range in number from few to many).
