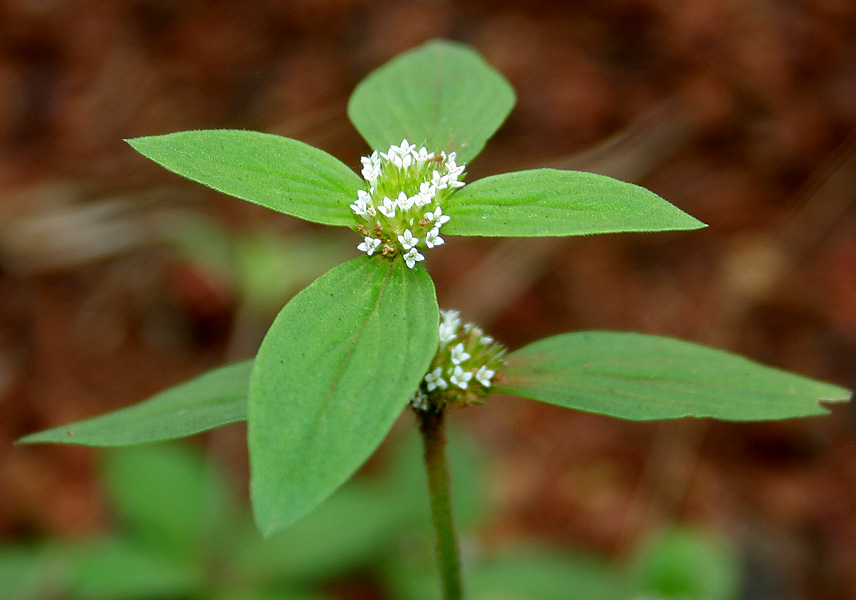

Scientific classification
- Kingdom: Plantae
- Clade: Tracheophytes
- Clade: Angiosperms
- Clade: Eudicots
- Clade: Asterids
- Order: Gentianales
- Family: Rubiaceae
- Subfamily: Rubioideae
- Tribe: Spermacoceae
- Genus: Spermacoce
- Species: S. ocymoides

Binomial name
- Spermacoce ocymoides Burm.f.

= Spermacoce ocymoides =

Species of plant

Spermacoce ocymoides is a species of plant in the Rubiaceae. It is widespread in Maldives, India, Sri Lanka, Myanmar, Thailand, Vietnam, Malaysia, Indonesia, Philippines, New Guinea, Solomon Isles, Fiji, Samoa, Vanuatu.
