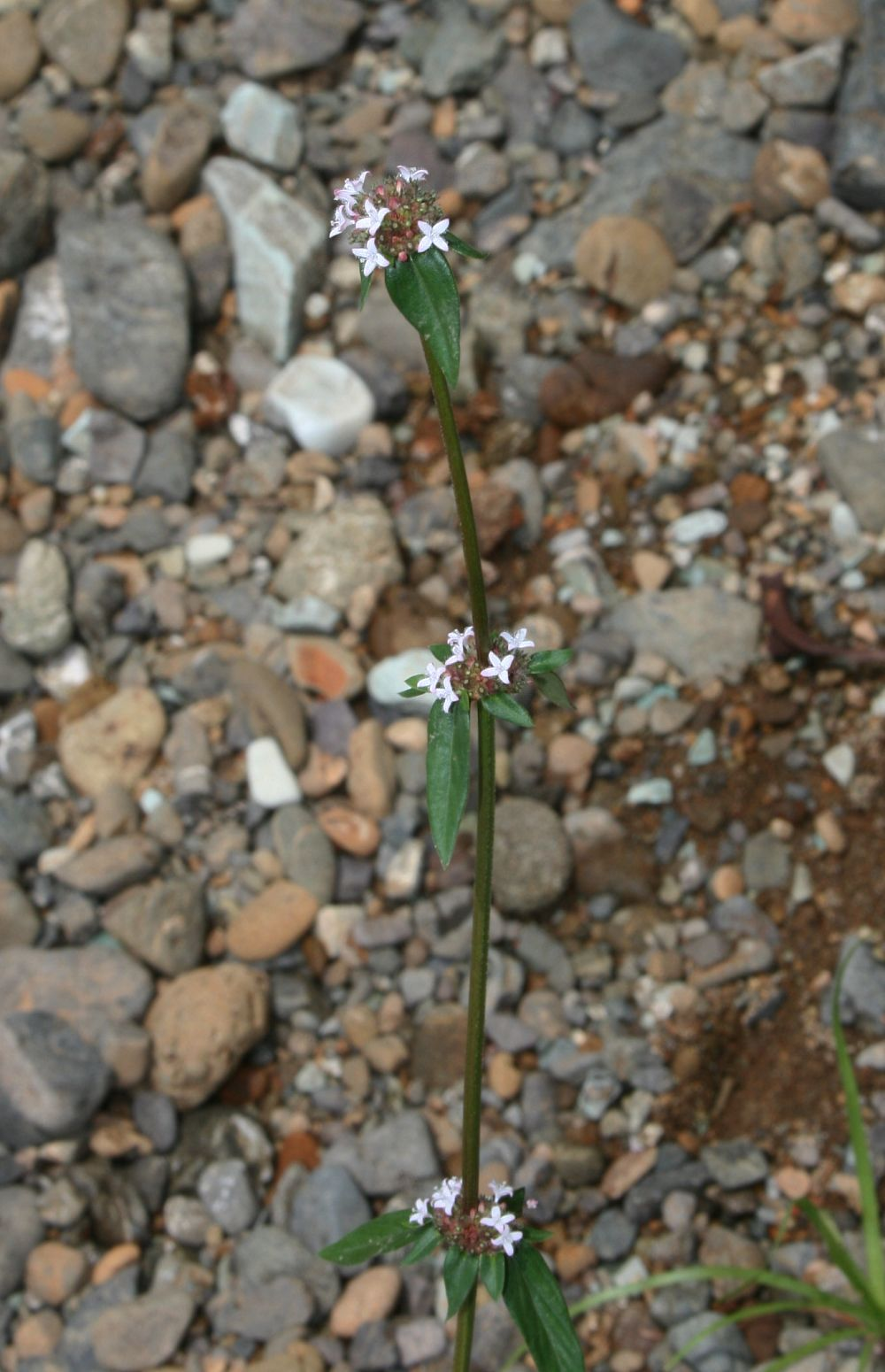

Conservation status
- Least Concern (IUCN 3.1)

Scientific classification
- Kingdom: Plantae
- Clade: Tracheophytes
- Clade: Angiosperms
- Clade: Eudicots
- Clade: Asterids
- Order: Gentianales
- Family: Rubiaceae
- Subfamily: Rubioideae
- Tribe: Spermacoceae
- Genus: Spermacoce
- Species: S. remota

Binomial name
- Spermacoce remota Lam.

Synonyms
- Borreria remota (Lam.) Bacigalupo & E.L.Cabral; Spermacoce parviflora Salisb.; Spermacoce assurgens Ruiz & Pav.; Spermacoce suffrutescens Jacq.; Spermacoce vaginata Willd. in J.J.Roemer & J.A.Schultes; Spermacoce echioides Kunth in F.W.H.von Humboldt, A.J.A.Bonpland & C.S.Kunth; Spermacoce lanceolata Link; Bigelovia vaginata (Willd.) Spreng.; Borreria wydleriana DC.; Spermacoce hebecarpa DC.; Spermacoce tetragona DC.; Spermacoce chapmanii Torr. & A.Gray; Spermacoce dichotoma Willd. ex Steud.; Spermacoce sexangularis Sieber ex Steud.; Tessiera pubescens Miq.; Tessiera miquelonana Lévèq.; Borreria assurgens (Ruiz & Pav.) Griseb.; Spermacoce wydleriana (DC.) Kuntze; Borreria malacophylla Standl. & L.O.Williams; Spermacoce tenuior var. commersonii Verdc.; Spermacoce hondurensis Govaerts

= Spermacoce remota =

Woodland false buttonweed

Species of plant

Spermacoce remota, the woodland false buttonweed, is a species of plant in the Rubiaceae. It is native to the southeastern United States (Texas, Florida, Georgia, Alabama), West Indies (Bermuda, Bahamas, Hispaniola, Puerto Rico, the Cayman Islands, Trinidad, Lesser Antilles, etc.), Mexico, Central America and South America. It is naturalized in Taiwan, Southeast Asia (Thailand, Vietnam, Malaysia, Indonesia), China (Guangdong), India, Sri Lanka, New Guinea, Mauritius and many other oceanic islands (including Hawaii and the Galápagos).

Spermacoce remota is a perennial herb or sub-shrub up to 70 cm tall. Stems are either round or square in cross-section. Leaves are lanceolate, up to 5 cm long. Flowers are small, white, in a clump at the top of the stem. This herb is a common ground for oviposition of butterfly eggs, such as those of Anartia fatima.
