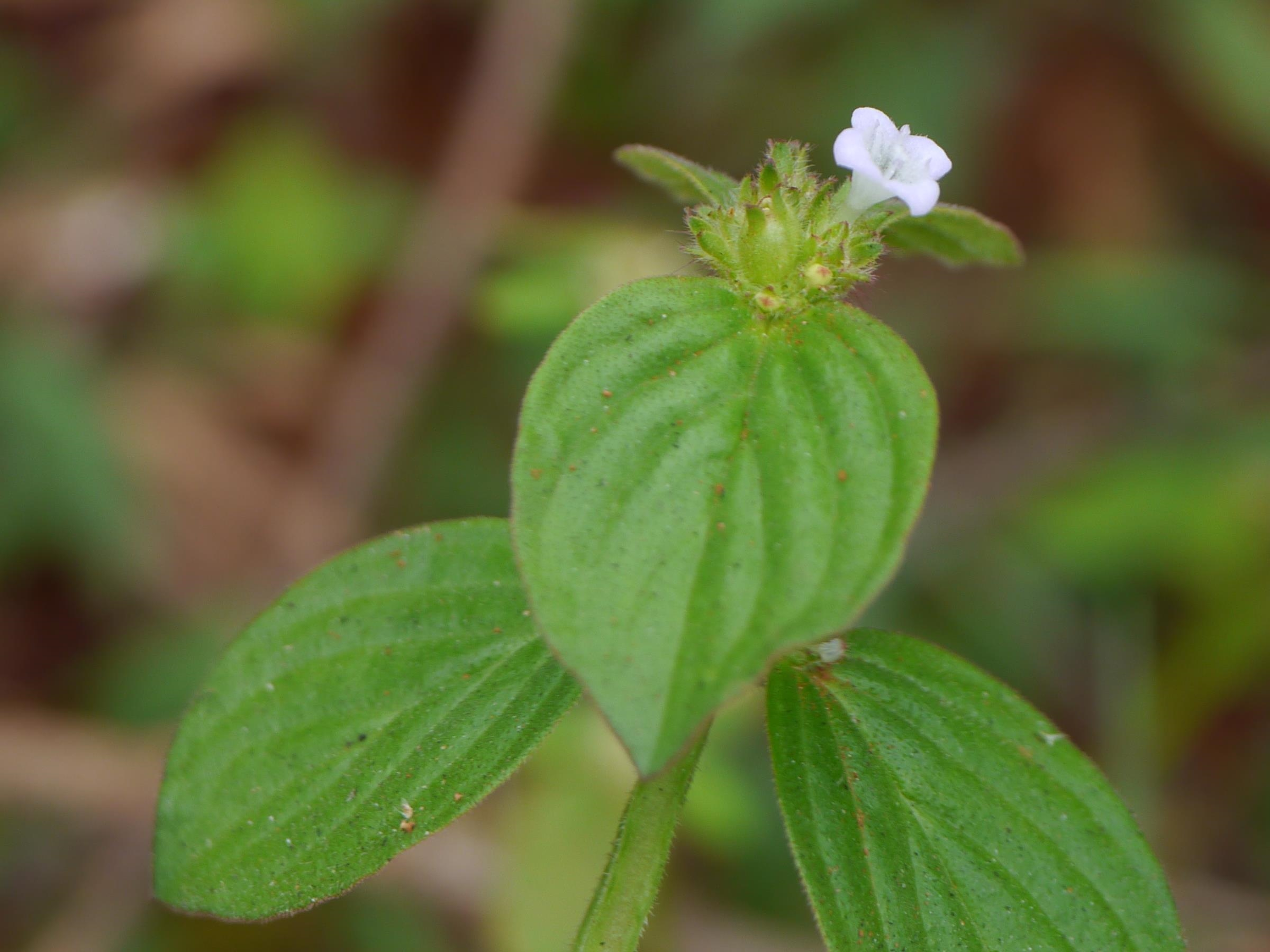

Scientific classification
- Kingdom: Plantae
- Clade: Tracheophytes
- Clade: Angiosperms
- Clade: Eudicots
- Clade: Asterids
- Order: Gentianales
- Family: Rubiaceae
- Subfamily: Rubioideae
- Tribe: Spermacoceae
- Genus: Spermacoce
- Species: S. alata

Binomial name
- Spermacoce alata Aubl.

Synonyms
- Bigelovia elata Bartl. ex DC., pro syn.; Borreria alata (Aubl.) DC.

= Spermacoce alata =

Winged false buttonweed

Species of plant

Spermacoce alata, the winged false buttonweed, is a species of plant in the family Rubiaceae. It is widespread across the warmer parts of the Western Hemisphere and naturalized in many other parts of the world.

== Description ==
Spermacoce alata is a perennial herb, sometimes erect but other times decumbent. Stems are square in cross-section, with wings along the corners running lengthwise along the stem. Leaves are elliptical to oblong, up to 8 cm long. Flowers are white to very pale purple, formed in axillary clumps.

== Distribution ==
Spermacoce alata is considered native to southern Mexico, Central America, a few islands in the Caribbean (Trinidad and the Leeward Islands), and parts of South America (French Guiana, Suriname, Guyana, Venezuela, Colombia, Ecuador, Peru, Brazil, Paraguay and Argentina). It is reportedly naturalized in tropical Africa (from Liberia to Uganda), China (Fujian, Guangdong, Hainan, Taiwan, Zhejiang), India, Nepal, Sri Lanka, Bangladesh, the Andaman & Nicobar Islands, Malaysia, Thailand, Borneo, Java, Myanmar (Burma), Sumatra, Queensland, the (Australian) Northern Territory, Fiji and Samoa.
