= Spermacoce ovalifolia =

Broadleaf false buttonweed

Scientific classification
- Kingdom: Plantae
- Clade: Tracheophytes
- Clade: Angiosperms
- Clade: Eudicots
- Clade: Asterids
- Order: Gentianales
- Family: Rubiaceae
- Subfamily: Rubioideae
- Tribe: Spermacoceae
- Genus: Spermacoce
- Species: S. ovalifolia

Binomial name
- Spermacoce ovalifolia (M.Martens & Galeotti) Hemsl.

Synonyms
- Borreria ovalifolia M.Martens & Galeotti; Spermacoce pringlei S.Watson; Spermacoce ernestii Fosberg & D.Powell

Species of plant

Spermacoce ovalifolia, the broadleaf false buttonweed, is a species of plants in the Rubiaceae. It is native to Mexico, Central America, parts of the Caribbean (Cuba, Puerto Rico, Haiti, Trinidad, and the Windward Islands), and South America (Venezuela, Colombia, Ecuador, Peru, Bolivia, Brazil, Paraguay).

Spermacoce ovalifolia is an annual herb about 30 cm tall. Leaves are ovate, up to 4 cm long. flowers are very small, in dense axillary clusters.
