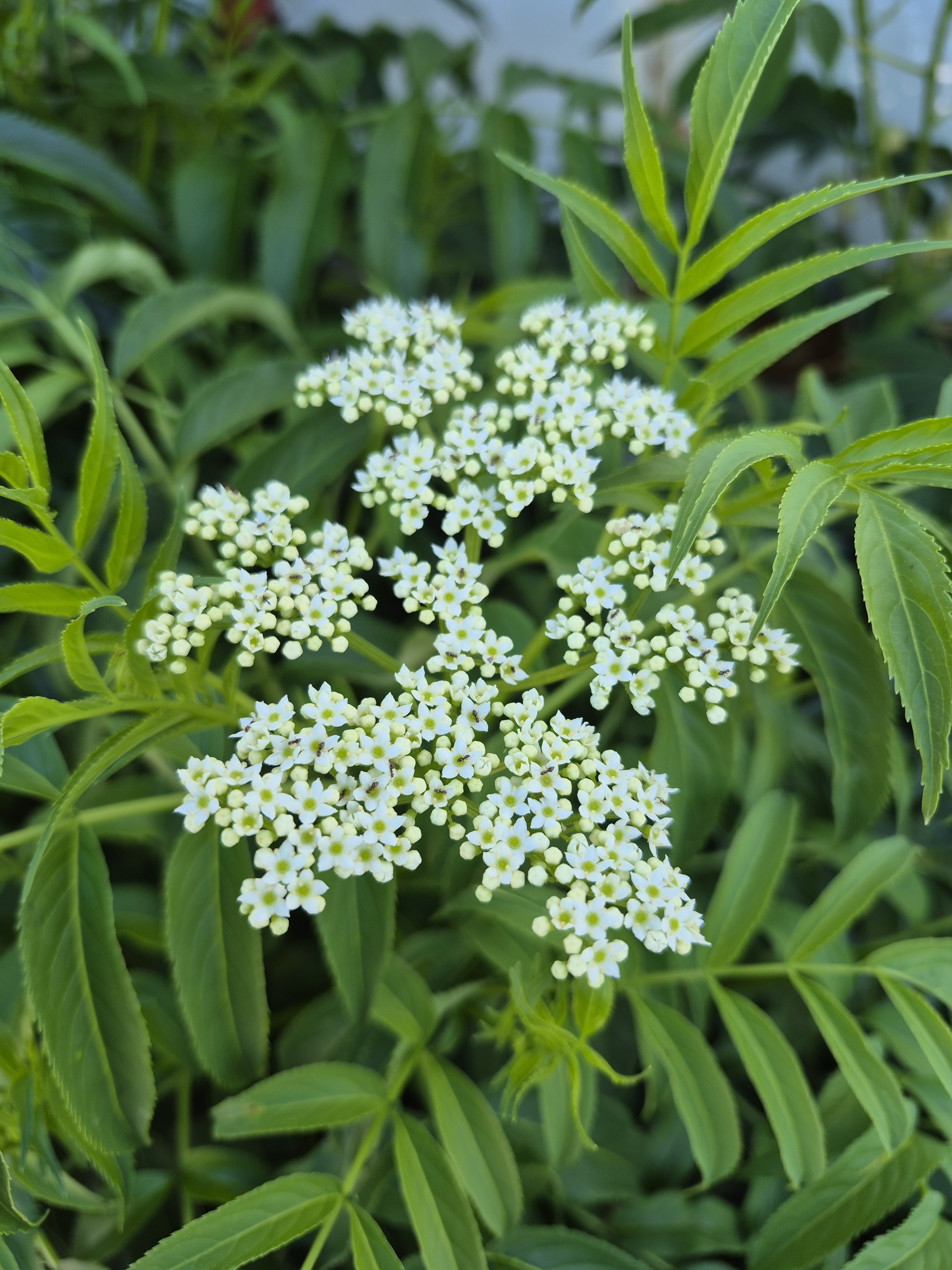
- Flowers and leaves, specimen found in Brazil

Scientific classification
- Kingdom: Plantae
- Clade: Embryophytes
- Clade: Tracheophytes
- Clade: Spermatophytes
- Clade: Angiosperms
- Clade: Eudicots
- Clade: Asterids
- Order: Dipsacales
- Family: Viburnaceae
- Genus: Sambucus
- Species: S. australis

Binomial name
- Sambucus australis Cham. & Schltdl.

Synonyms
- Sambucus pentagynia Larrañaga

= Sambucus australis =

Species of tree

Sambucus australis is a species of tree in the family Viburnaceae. It is native to South America.

== Distribution ==
Sambucus australis ranges from southeastern and southern Brazil to Paraguay, Uruguay, and northeastern Argentina.

== Fruit ==
Sambucus australis has black, oval fruit about 7mm in diameter that is edible when cooked.

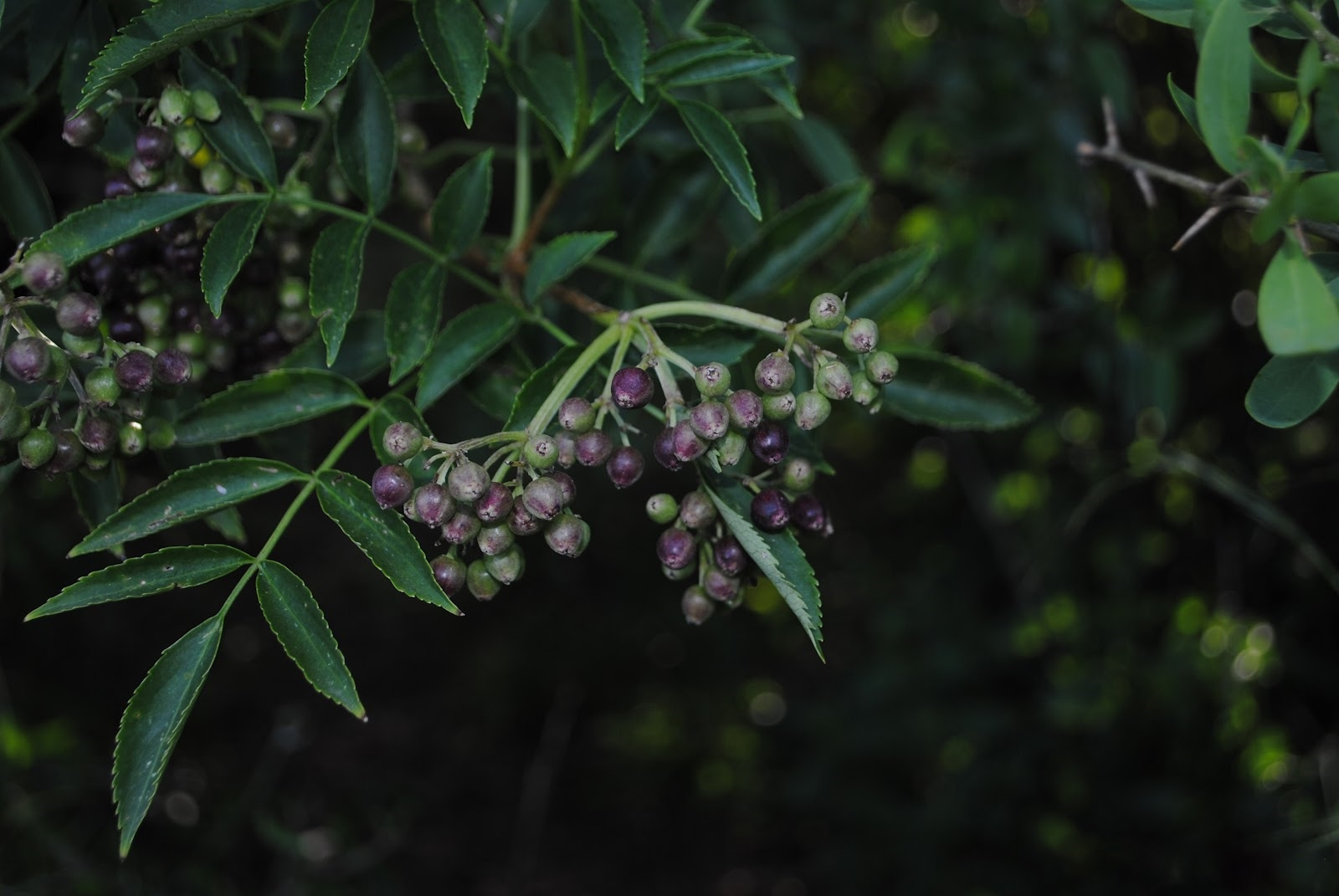
The fruit of Sambucus australis.
