= Spermacoce neoterminalis =

Everglades Key false buttonweed

Conservation status
- Vulnerable (NatureServe)

Scientific classification
- Kingdom: Plantae
- Clade: Tracheophytes
- Clade: Angiosperms
- Clade: Eudicots
- Clade: Asterids
- Order: Gentianales
- Family: Rubiaceae
- Subfamily: Rubioideae
- Tribe: Spermacoceae
- Genus: Spermacoce
- Species: S. neoterminalis

Binomial name
- Spermacoce neoterminalis Govaerts

Synonyms
- Borreria terminalis Small; Spermacoce terminalis (Small) Kartesz & Gandhi 1992, illegitimate homonym of S. terminalis Vell. 1829

Species of plant

Spermacoce neoterminalis, the Everglades Key false buttonweed or Everglade Key bouvardia, is a species of plant in the Rubiaceae. It is endemic to southern Florida, from the Everglades as far north as Lake Okeechobee.

Spermacoce neoterminalis is a perennial herb with a woody root. Stems are up to 40 cm tall, generally not branching above the ground. Leaves are elliptical. Flowers are small, white, clustered in terminal and axillary glomerules.
