= Spermacoce glabra =

Smooth false buttonweed

Scientific classification
- Kingdom: Plantae
- Clade: Tracheophytes
- Clade: Angiosperms
- Clade: Eudicots
- Clade: Asterids
- Order: Gentianales
- Family: Rubiaceae
- Subfamily: Rubioideae
- Tribe: Spermacoceae
- Genus: Spermacoce
- Species: S. glabra

Binomial name
- Spermacoce glabra Michx. 1803 not Sessé & Moc. 1888 nor Roxb. 1820

Synonyms
- Spermacoceodes glabrum (Michx.) Kuntze; Spermacoce glabra f. latifolia Chodat & Hassl.; Spermacoceodes glabrum var. rectum Bacigalupo

Species of plant

Spermacoce glabra, smooth false buttonweed, is a New World species of plants in the coffee family.

The species is widespread across much of North America and South America. In the United States, it is found in the southern part of the Mississippi Valley from Illinois to Louisiana, the range extending westward into Texas, Oklahoma and eastern Kansas, and eastward along the Ohio River. Isolated populations are reported from further east, in Maryland, Virginia, South Carolina, Georgia and Florida. The species also occurs in southern Mexico (Tabasco and Campeche), Honduras, and South America (Colombia, Venezuela, Ecuador, Brazil, Paraguay, Uruguay and Argentina).
