= Spermacoce brachysepala =

West Indian false buttonweed

Scientific classification
- Kingdom: Plantae
- Clade: Tracheophytes
- Clade: Angiosperms
- Clade: Eudicots
- Clade: Asterids
- Order: Gentianales
- Family: Rubiaceae
- Subfamily: Rubioideae
- Tribe: Spermacoceae
- Genus: Spermacoce
- Species: S. brachysepala

Binomial name
- Spermacoce brachysepala (Urb.) Alain in H.A.Liogier & L.F.Martorell

Synonyms
- Borreria brachysepala Urb.; Borreria laevis var. sintenisii Urb.; Borreria brachysepala var. pulverulenta Urb.; Spermacoce sintenisii (Urb.) Alain

Species of plant

Spermacoce brachysepala, the West Indian false buttonweed, is a plant species in the Rubiaceae. It is native to Puerto Rico, Haiti and the Dominican Republic.
