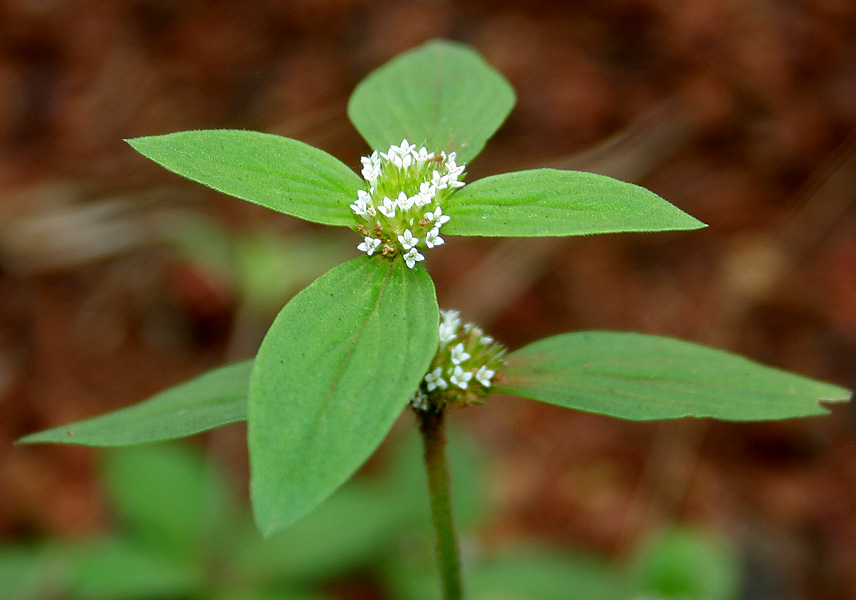
- Spermacoce ocymoides

Scientific classification
- Kingdom: Plantae
- Clade: Tracheophytes
- Clade: Angiosperms
- Clade: Eudicots
- Clade: Asterids
- Order: Gentianales
- Family: Rubiaceae
- Subfamily: Rubioideae
- Tribe: Spermacoceae
- Genus: Spermacoce; L.

Type species
- Spermacoce tenuior L.

Synonyms
- Arbulocarpus Tennant; Bigelovia Spreng., nom. illeg.; Bigelowia DC., orth. var.; Borreria G.Mey., nom. cons.; Chaenocarpus Neck. ex A.Juss.; Chenocarpus Neck., in opus utique oppr.; Covolia Neck., in opus utique oppr.; Dasycephala (DC.) Hook.f.; Dichrospermum Bremek.; Diodioides Loefl.; Gruhlmania Neck., in opus utique oppr.; Hemidiodia K.Schum.; Hypodematium A.Rich.), nom. illeg.; Jurgensia Raf.; Octodon Thonn.; Paragophyton K.Schum.; Pterostephus C.Presl; Spermacoceodes Kuntze; Tardavel Adans., nom. rej.

= Spermacoce =

Genus of plants

Spermacoce or false buttonweed is a genus of flowering plants in the family Rubiaceae. It comprises about 275 species found throughout the tropics and subtropics. Its highest diversity is found in the Americas, followed by Africa, Australia and Asia. It can be used for the treatment of eczema by rubbing the leaves on the affected part.

== Description ==
The species are herbs or small shrubs with small- to medium-sized, four-lobed flowers arranged in capitate inflorescences. Some have a brightly coloured calyx and are eye-catching, particularly the Australian species. The corolla is variable in colour, often white, but also all shades of blue, pink and maroon. The fruit is usually a two-seeded capsule, sometimes a schizocarp or nut.

== Selected species ==
Spermacoce is a highly diverse genus with over 290 species in many tropical and subtropical places around the globe. North American species include:

- Spermacoce alata Aubl. - West Indies, most of Latin America; naturalized in Africa, India, China, Southeast Asia, Australia, Melanesia
- Spermacoce brachysepala (Urb.) Alain in H.A.Liogier & L.F.Martorell - West Indian false buttonweed - Puerto Rico, Haiti, Dominican Republic
- Spermacoce capitata Ruiz & Pav. - baldhead false buttonweed - Central and South America from Belize to Argentina
- Spermacoce confusa Rendle - river false buttonweed - Florida, West Indies, Latin America from Mexico to Argentina
- Spermacoce densiflora (DC.) Alain - bouquet false buttonweed - Florida, West Indies, Latin America from Mexico to Argentina
- Spermacoce eryngioides (Cham. & Schltdl.) Kuntze - whorled-leaf false buttonweed - West Indies including Puerto Rico; southeastern South America from Bolivia and Brazil to Argentina
- Spermacoce exilis (L.O. Williams) C. Adams - Pacific false buttonweed - Latin America from Mexico to Argentina, plus West Indies; naturalized in Africa, China, India, southeast Asia and some tropical oceanic islands
- Spermacoce glabra Michx. - smooth false buttonweed - southern and eastern United States (mostly in the Lower Mississippi Valley); also South America
- Spermacoce keyensis Urb. - Florida false buttonweed - southern Florida, Bahamas, southern tip of Texas (Cameron County)
- Spermacoce neoterminalis Govaerts - Everglades false buttonweed- southern Florida
- Spermacoce ocymoides Burm.f.
- Spermacoce ovalifolia (M. Martens & Galeotti) Hemsl. - broadleaf false buttonweed - West Indies including Puerto Rico, Latin America from Mexico to Paraguay
- Spermacoce prostrata Aubl. - prostrate false buttonweed - Florida, Mississippi, Alabama, West Indies including Puerto Rico; most of Latin America; naturalized in China, Vietnam, Sri Lanka and Java
- Spermacoce remota - Lam. - woodland false buttonweed - Florida, Georgia, Texas, Alabama, West Indies, much of Latin America; naturalized in Southeast Asia, China, India, New Guinea, Mauritius and many oceanic islands (including Hawaii)
- Spermacoce tenuior L. - slender false buttonweed - Texas, Louisiana, Georgia, West Indies; Latin America from Mexico to Bolivia; naturalized in Tanzania, Java, Sulawesi and Galápagos
- Spermacoce tetraquetra A. Rich. - pineland false buttonweed - Florida, West Indies, Mexico, Central America
- Spermacoce verticillata L. - shrubby false buttonweed - Florida, West Indies, most of Latin America; naturalized in Africa, Australia, assorted oceanic islands

== Gallery ==
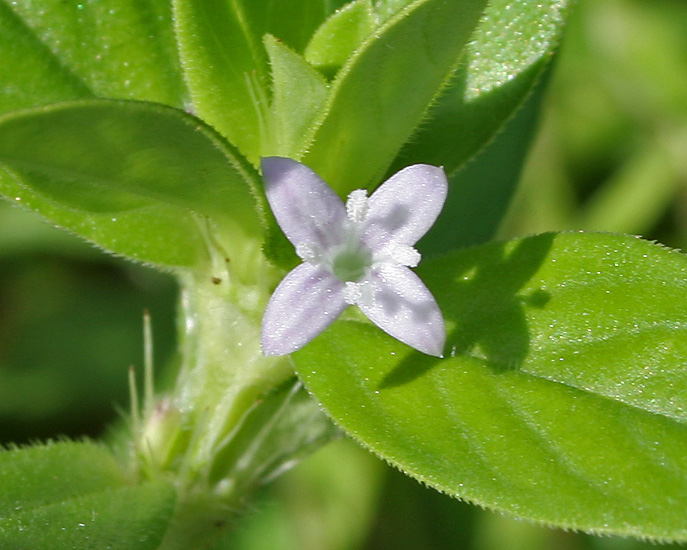
Spermacoce articularis in Hyderabad, India

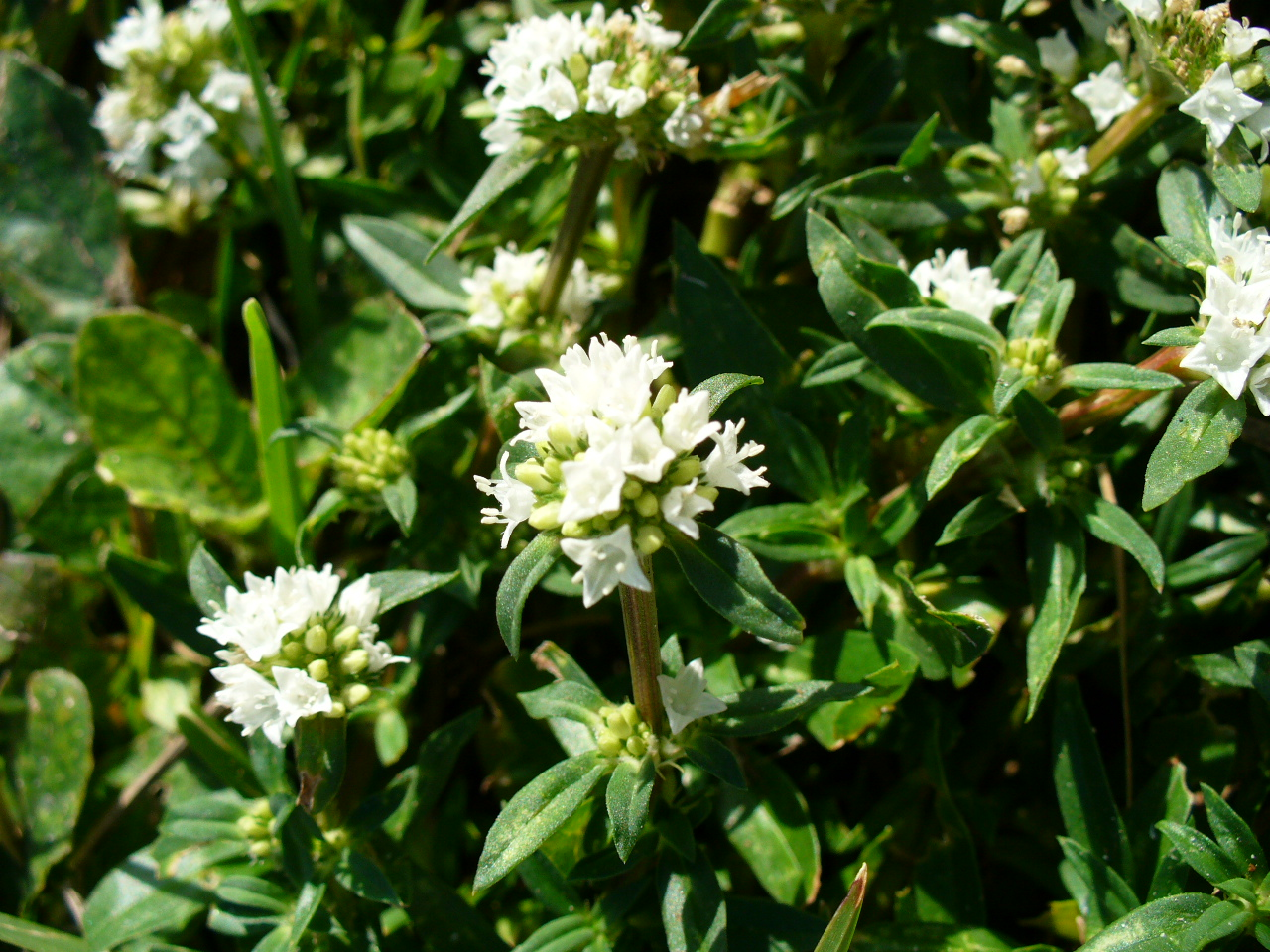
Spermacoce terminalis

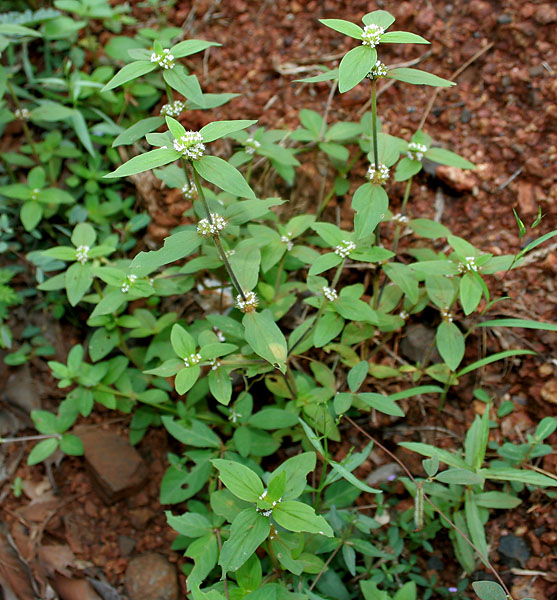
Spermacoce ocymoides at Ananthagiri Hills, in Rangareddy district of Andhra Pradesh, India.

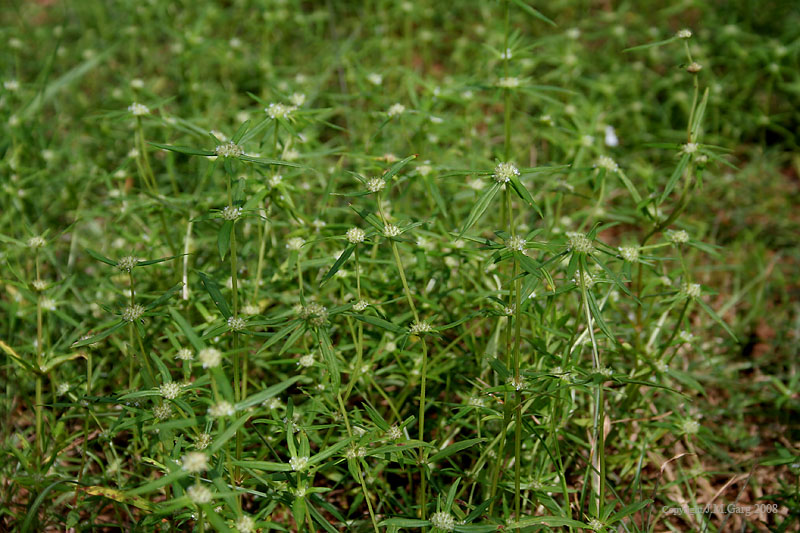
Spermacoce pusilla in Hyderabad, India.
