= Blewett =

Blewett is a surname of Anglo Norman origin. Notable people with the surname include:

- Alexander (Zander) Blewett, III (b. 1945), US lawyer
- Anders Blewett (b. 1980), US politician
- Bob Blewett (1877–1958), US baseball player
- Curtis Blewett, Canadian sailor
- Edward Blewett (1848–1929), US owner of mines
- George Blewett (1873–1912), Canadian academic and philosopher
- Greg Blewett (b. 1971), Australian cricketer
- Hildred Blewett (1911–2004), Canadian physicist
- Jean Blewett (1862–1934), Canadian writer
- Jimmy Blewett (b. 1980), US NASCAR driver
- Joan Warnow-Blewett (1931–2006), US archivist
- John Blewett III (1973–2007), US NASCAR driver
- John P. Blewett (1910–2000), Canadian-American physicist
- Joseph Blewett (1925–2013), South African cricketer
- Kate Blewett (fl. 1990s–present), British documentary filmmaker
- Kerry Blewett (b. 1986), British life guard
- Mary Blewett (b. 1938), US author and historian
- Neal Blewett (b. 1933), Australian politician and political science academic
- Sandra Blewett (1949–2024), New Zealand marathon swimmer
- Scott Blewett (b. 1996), US baseball player
- Tristan Blewett (b. 1996), South African rugby player

== See also ==
- Blewett, Washington, a small mining town in the US state of Washington
- Blewett Falls Lake, a man-made lake on the Great Pee Dee River in the US state of North Carolina
- Blewett Pass, a pass in the Cascade Range of mountains in the US state of Washington
- Hinton Blewett, a village and civil parish in Somerset, England
- 22927 Blewett, a main-belt asteroid which was discovered in 1999
- Blewit, two species of edible mushrooms
- Blewitt, a surname
- Bluet (disambiguation)
- Bluett, a surname
- Bluiett, a surname
