= Bluett =

- Language: Old French to Middle English

Origin
- Meaning: A nickname for someone who wore blue clothes or had blue eyes
- Region of origin: England (esp. Cornwall)

Other names
- Variant forms: Blewett, Blewitt, Bloet, Bluiett, Bluet

Bluett is a surname. Notable people with the surname include:

- Fred Bluett (1876–1942), London-born Australian vaudevillian
- Grant Bluett, Australian orienteer
- Gus Bluett (1902–1936), son of Fred, Australian comic actor
- John Bluett (1603–1634), English politician
- John Bluett (cricketer) (1930–2019), English cricketer
- Lennie Bluett (1919–2016), American film actor, pianist, dancer and singer
- Thomas Bluett (c. 1690–1749), Maryland colonial judge and writer
- Thomas Bluett (politician) (1879–1958), Pennsylvania politician
- William Bluett (1834–1885), New Zealand politician

== See also ==
- Blewett, a surname
- Blewit, two species of edible mushrooms
- Blewitt, a surname
- Bluet (disambiguation)
- Bluett Wallop (1726–1749), British soldier, courtier and politician
- Bluiett, a surname
