= Rick's Café =

Rick's Café may refer to:

- The fictional bar "Rick's Café Américain", which is the principal set of the film Casablanca.
- Rick's Café Casablanca, the modern reconstruction of that bar in that city, an operating restaurant, bar, and cafe.
