= Charles Blewitt =

Charles Blewitt may refer to:

- Charles Blewitt (cricketer) (1877–1937), English cricketer
- Joe Blewitt (Charles Edward Blewitt, 1895–1954), British long-distance runner
