= Bluiett =

Bluiett is a surname. Notable people with the surname include:

- Hamiet Bluiett (1940–2018), US jazz musician
- Trevon Bluiett (b. 1994), US basketball player

== See also ==
- Blewett, a surname
- Blewit, two species of edible mushrooms
- Blewitt, a surname
- Bluet (disambiguation)
- Bluett, a surname
