= Blewitt =

Blewitt is a surname of Anglo-Norman origin first attested in England during the 11th century. Notable people with the surname include:

- Brett Blewitt (born 1976), Australian actor
- Charles Blewitt (1877–1937), English cricketer
- Chris Blewitt (born 1995), American football player
- Darren Blewitt (b. 1985), English footballer
- Edward Francis Blewitt (1859–1926), Pennsylvania State Senator
- Joe Blewitt (1895–1954), English athlete
- Jonathan Blewitt (1782–1853), English organist and composer
- Marnie Blewitt, Geneticist
- Simon Blewitt (b. 1959, AKA Sam Blue), English rock singer

== See also ==
- Blewit, two species of edible mushrooms
- Blewitt Springs, Adelaide, Australia
- Blewett, a surname
- Bluet (disambiguation)
- Bluett, a surname
- Hinton Blewitt, a village and civil parish in Somerset, England
- Bluiett, a surname
