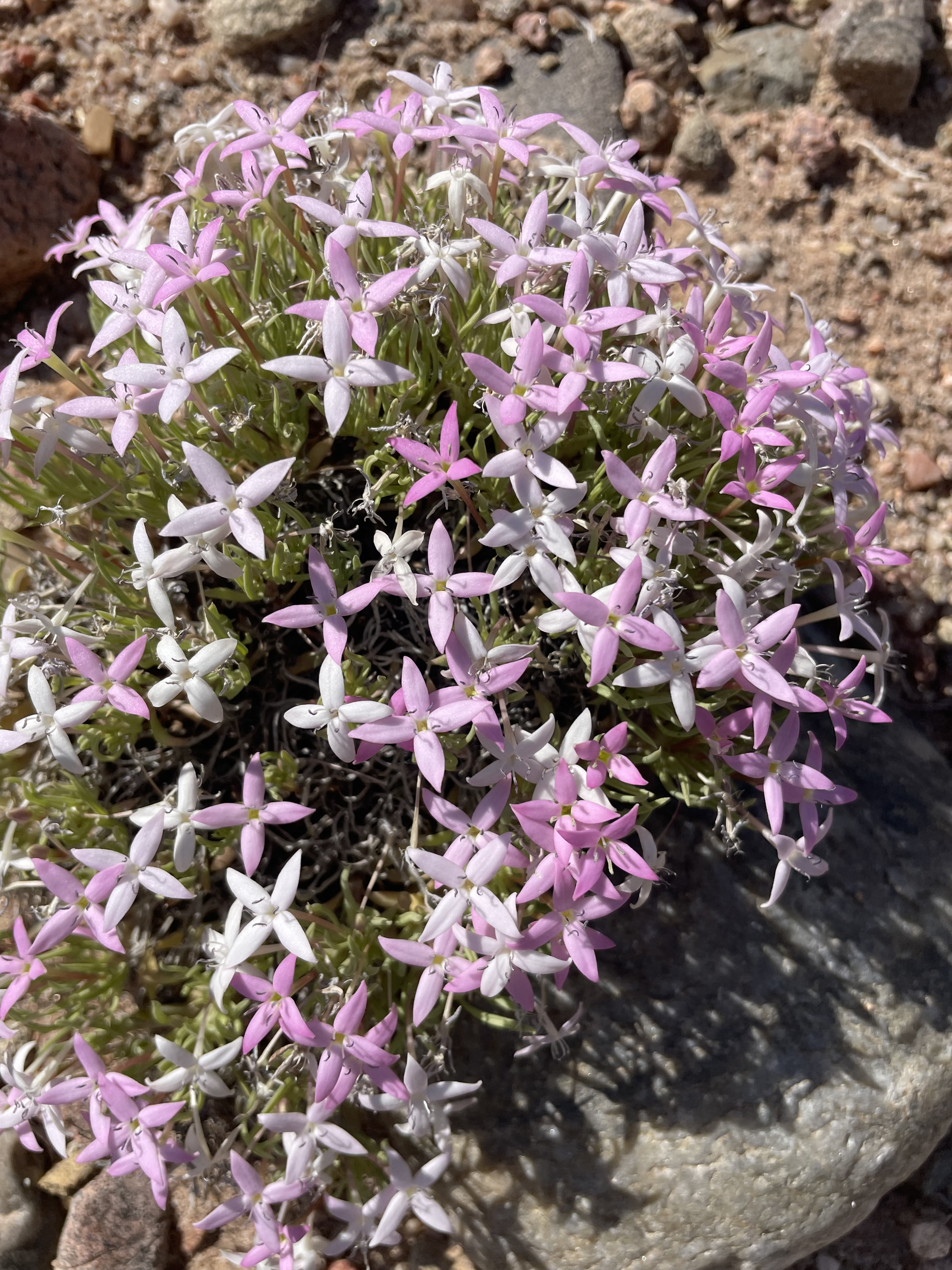

Scientific classification
- Kingdom: Plantae
- Clade: Tracheophytes
- Clade: Angiosperms
- Clade: Eudicots
- Clade: Asterids
- Order: Gentianales
- Family: Rubiaceae
- Genus: Houstonia
- Species: H. rubra

Binomial name
- Houstonia rubra Cav.

Synonyms
- Hedyotis rubra (Cav.) A.Gray; Houstonia saxicola Eastw.; Oldenlandia rubra (Cav.) A.Gray

= Houstonia rubra =

Species of plant

Houstonia rubra, the red bluet, is a plant species in the Rubiaceae. It is a small herb with white to pink to red to reddish-purple flowers, native to the southwestern United States and northern and central Mexico: Coahuila, Nuevo León, Hidalgo, Zacatecas, Guanajuato, Puebla, Sonora, Durango, Chihuahua, Arizona, New Mexico, southeastern Utah and western Texas.
