= Lennie Bluett =

American actor (1919–2016)

- Born: January 21, 1919; Los Angeles, California, U.S.
- Died: January 1, 2016 (aged 96); Los Angeles, California, U.S.
- Occupations: Actor, musician
- Years active: 1937–2014

Lennie Bluett (January 21, 1919 – January 1, 2016) was an American film actor, pianist, dancer and singer. His mother was a cook for Humphrey Bogart. At age 16, Bluett started playing the piano at Bogart's parties.

Bluett formed a harmonizing group with his friends called "Four Dreamers". Nat King Cole used to play with the band.

He played a soldier in Gone With the Wind in 1939. During production of the film, the outdoor set's bathrooms were segregated with signs that said "white" and "colored," respectively, until an appalled Bluett brought this to the attention of Clark Gable, who threatened to quit the film unless the signs were taken down.

His career consisted of minor roles due to the limited opportunities for African-Americans at the time. He relocated to Vancouver in order to avoid being drafted into World War II, and returned afterwards. In his later years, he also played piano at Rick's Cafe Casablanca; he had originally tried out for the role of Sam, the piano player, in the 1942 film Casablanca. He died in Los Angeles on January 1, 2016, at the age of 96.

== Filmography ==
Year	Title	Role	Notes
1936	Strike Me Pink	Dancer	Uncredited
1937	A Day at the Races	Black Singer	Uncredited
1937	Ali Baba Goes to Town	Arab	Uncredited
1938	Spirit of Youth	Dancer	Uncredited
1939	Gone With the Wind	Yankee Soldier in Shantytown / Townsperson	Uncredited
1941	The Big Store	Singer	Uncredited
1942	Born to Sing	Specialty -'Ballad for Americans'	Uncredited
1942	Star Spangled Rhythm	Dancer - 'Sharp as a Tack' Number	Uncredited
1943	Cabin in the Sky	Dancer / Jim Henry's Paradise Patron	Uncredited
1943	Stormy Weather	Dancer / Nightclub Patron	Uncredited
1943	Thank Your Lucky Stars	Dancer in 'Ice Cold Katy' Number	Uncredited
1943	I Dood It	Part of Hazel Scott's Entourage / Singer in Jericho	Uncredited
1944	Broadway Rhythm	Dancer in 'Brazilian Boogie'	Uncredited
1944	When Strangers Marry	Dancer at Big Jims	Uncredited
1944	Carolina Blues	Dancer in 'Mr. Beebe'	Uncredited
1945	Ziegfeld Follies	Dancer ('Love')	Uncredited
1948	State of the Union	Page Boy	Uncredited
1949	Mighty Joe Young	Nightclub Dancer	Uncredited
1954	A Star Is Born	Dancer - 'Born in a Trunk' Number	Uncredited
1993	La Nuit sacrée	Pianiste	(final film role)
