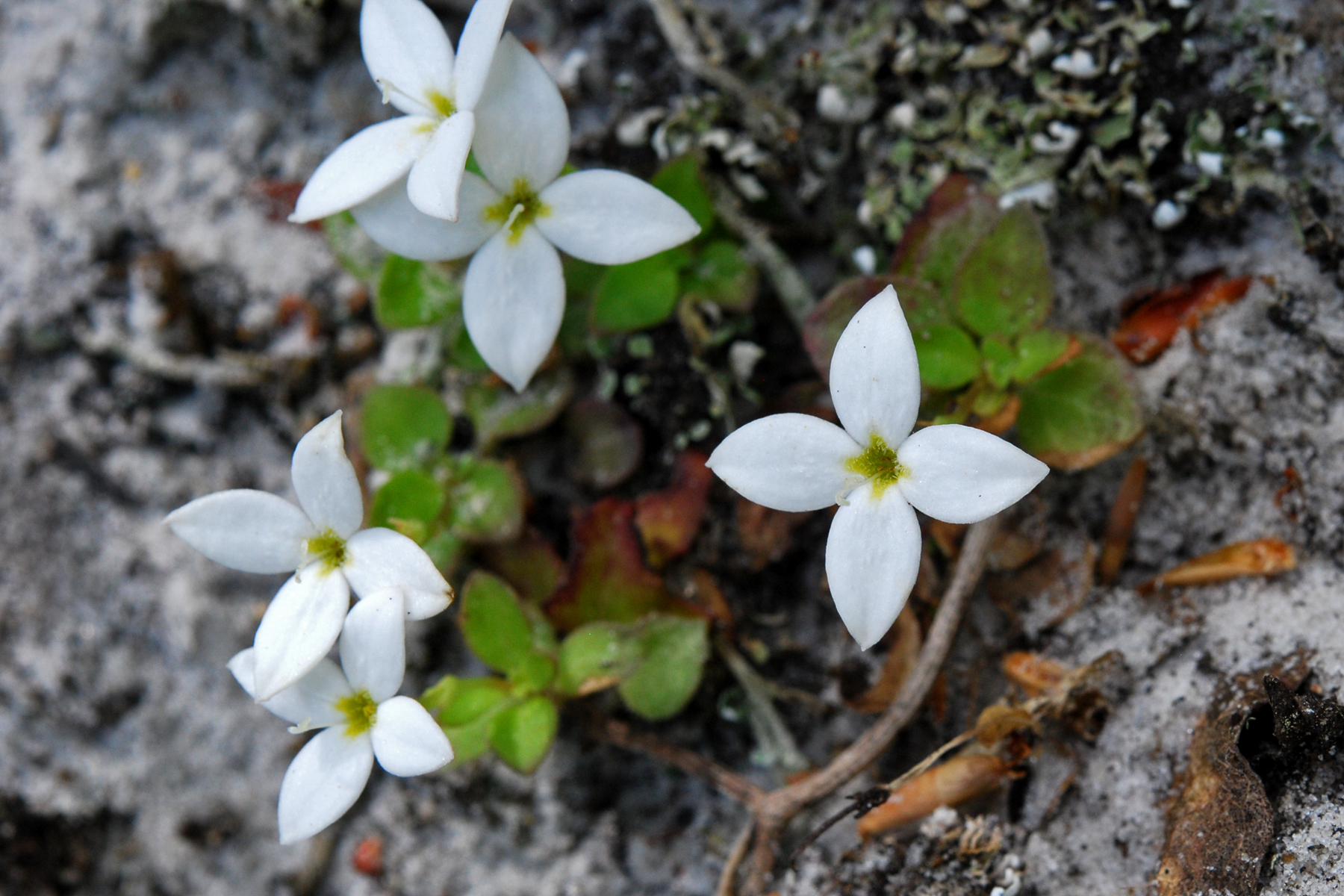

Conservation status
- Secure (NatureServe)

Scientific classification
- Kingdom: Plantae
- Clade: Tracheophytes
- Clade: Angiosperms
- Clade: Eudicots
- Clade: Asterids
- Order: Gentianales
- Family: Rubiaceae
- Genus: Houstonia
- Species: H. procumbens

Binomial name
- Houstonia procumbens (Walter ex J.F.Gmel.) Standl.

= Houstonia procumbens =

Species of plant

Houstonia procumbens, the roundleaf bluet, is a perennial species in the family Rubiaceae. It is native to the southeastern United States: Louisiana, Mississippi, Alabama, Georgia, Florida and South Carolina. Its native habitats include disturbed sites, and moist, open, sandy areas. Flowers bloom March to October.

This species can occur as an erect or creeping perennial or annual. Its leaves are oppositely arranged and are ovate to suborbicular in shape. They may reach a length between 7 and 10 millimeters in length and 4 to 10 millimeters wide. The flowers are white in color and have four petals.
