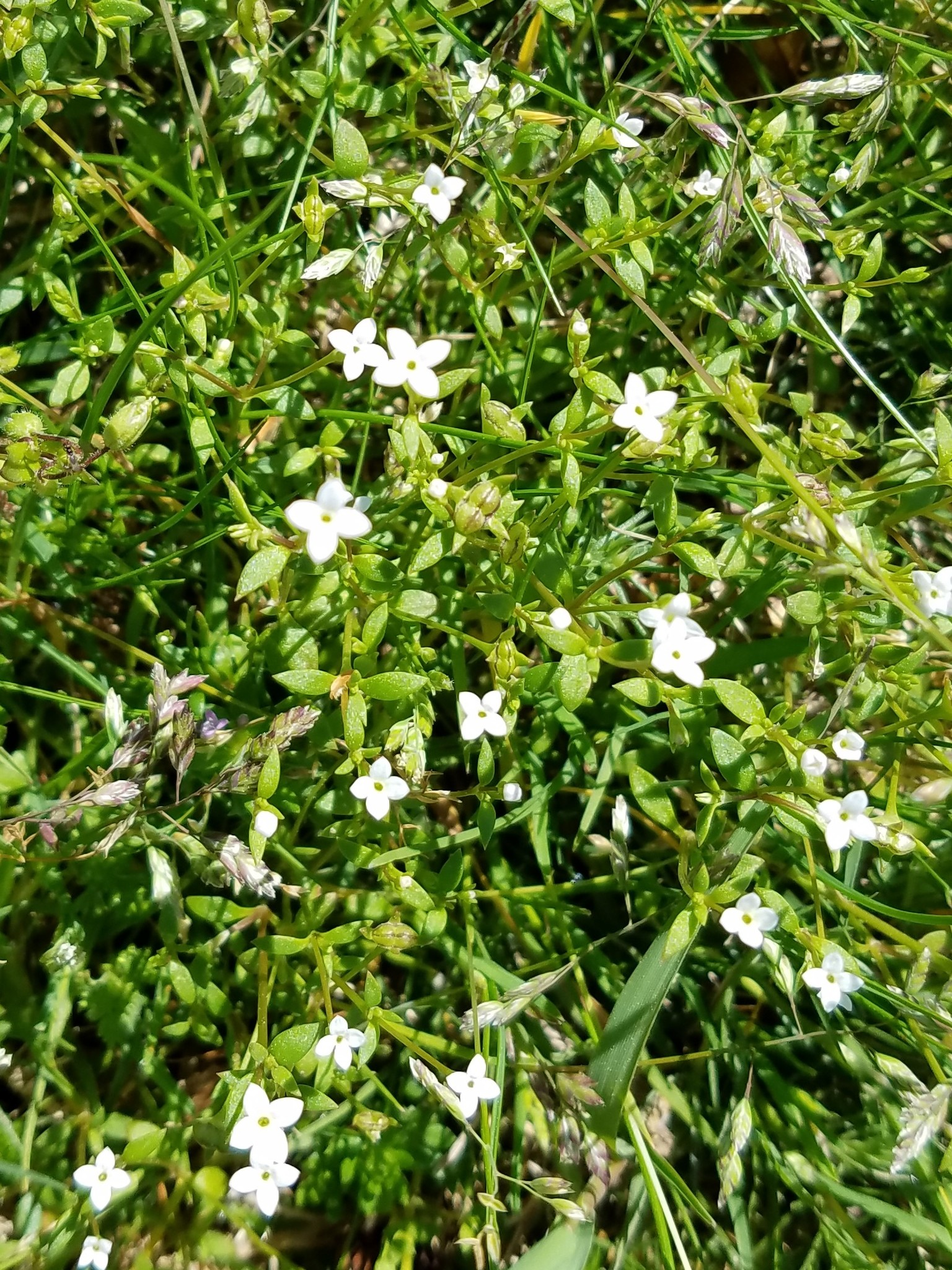

Scientific classification
- Kingdom: Plantae
- Clade: Tracheophytes
- Clade: Angiosperms
- Clade: Eudicots
- Clade: Asterids
- Order: Gentianales
- Family: Rubiaceae
- Genus: Houstonia
- Species: H. micrantha

Binomial name
- Houstonia micrantha (Shinners) Terrell

Synonyms
- Hedyotis crassifolia var. micrantha Shinners; Hedyotis australis W.H.Lewis & D.W.Moore

= Houstonia micrantha =

Species of plant

Houstonia micrantha, the southern bluet, is a plant species in the coffee family.

It is native to the south-central United States where it has been found in Texas, Louisiana, Arkansas, Mississippi, southern Missouri, Alabama, western Tennessee, extreme western Florida (Escambia County) plus a few isolated locations in Georgia.
