= Houstonia parviflora =

Scientific classification
- Kingdom: Plantae
- Clade: Tracheophytes
- Clade: Angiosperms
- Clade: Eudicots
- Clade: Asterids
- Order: Gentianales
- Family: Rubiaceae
- Genus: Houstonia
- Species: H. parviflora

Binomial name
- Houstonia parviflora Holz. ex Greenm.

Synonyms
- Hedyotis greenmanii Fosberg

Species of plant

Houstonia parviflora, the few-flowered bluet or Greenman's bluet, is a plant species in the Rubiaceae, found only in south-central Texas.
