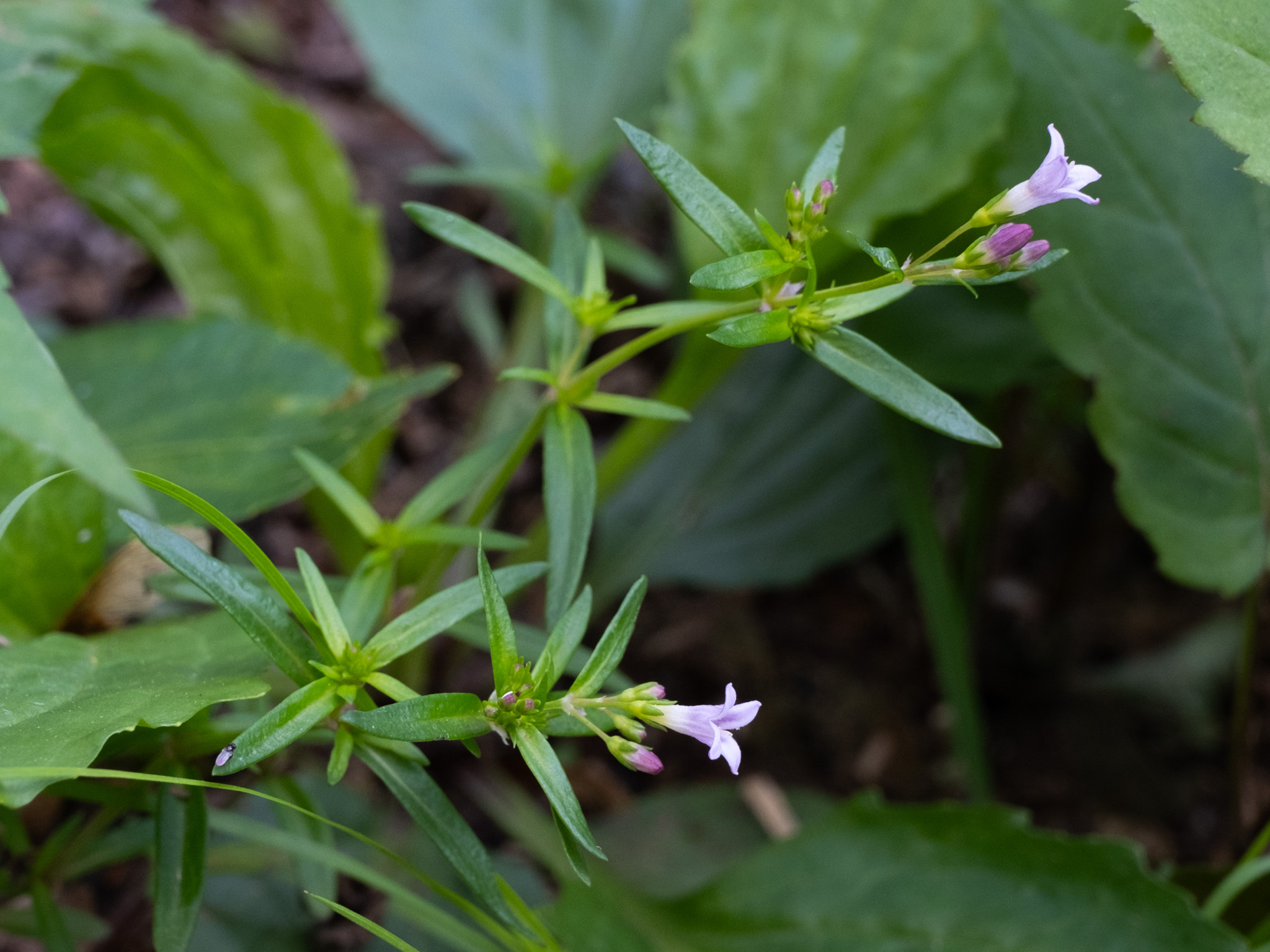

Scientific classification
- Kingdom: Plantae
- Clade: Tracheophytes
- Clade: Angiosperms
- Clade: Eudicots
- Clade: Asterids
- Order: Gentianales
- Family: Rubiaceae
- Genus: Houstonia
- Species: H. longifolia

Binomial name
- Houstonia longifolia Gaertn.

Synonyms
- Hedyotis longifolia (Gaertn.) Hook; Oldenlandia purpurea var. longifolia (Gaertn.) A.Gray; Houstonia purpurea var. longifolia (Gaertn.) A.Gray; Chamisme longifolia (Gaertn.) Nieuwl.; Hedyotis purpurea var. longifolia (Gaertn.) Fosberg

= Houstonia longifolia =

Species of plant

Houstonia longifolia, commonly known as long-leaved bluet or longleaf summer bluet, is a perennial plant in the family Rubiaceae. It can be found throughout most of the Eastern United States and Canada. It has been reported from every state east of the Mississippi River except Delaware, plus North Dakota, Minnesota, Missouri, Arkansas and Oklahoma, with isolated populations in Kansas and Texas. Also, all Canadian provinces from Quebec to Alberta. It prefers upland woods in poor, dry, often sandy soil.

== Description ==
It has upright stalks of 20 centimetres (8 in) or sometimes taller, rising from a basal rosette of leaves. The stalks are slender and branching, with small white flowers with 4 petals. The basal rosette of leaves withers away before the flowers bloom, and opposite leaves appear at intervals along the stems. Flowers bloom for about a month in late spring and summer. It prefers full or partial shade and dry or mesic conditions.

== Varieties ==
Two varieties are recognized:

- Houstonia longifolia var. longifolia - From Georgia and Arkansas north to Canada
- Houstonia longifolia var. tenuifolia (Nutt.) Alph.Wood. - Florida, Georgia, Tennessee, Virginia

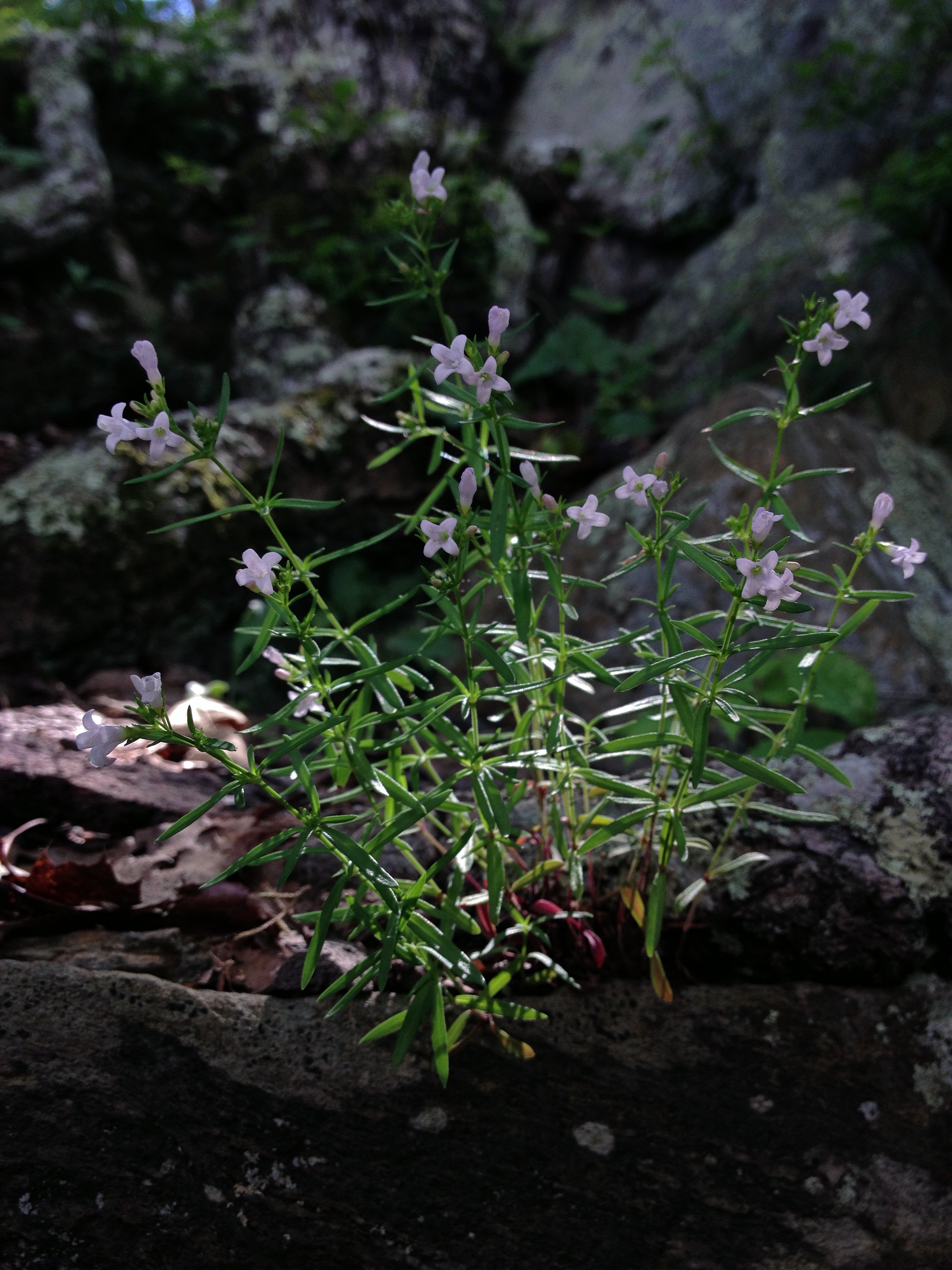
