= Houstonia ouachitana =

Scientific classification
- Kingdom: Plantae
- Clade: Tracheophytes
- Clade: Angiosperms
- Clade: Eudicots
- Clade: Asterids
- Order: Gentianales
- Family: Rubiaceae
- Genus: Houstonia
- Species: H. ouachitana

Binomial name
- Houstonia ouachitana (E.B.Sm.) Terrell

Synonyms
- Hedyotis ouachitana E.B. Sm.

Species of plant

Houstonia ouachitana, the Ouachita bluet, is a species of plants in the coffee family. It is endemic to the Ouachita Mountains of Arkansas and Oklahoma. It is an herb up to 20 cm tall, with lanceolate basal leaves and narrowly linear cauline leaves.
