= Houstonia subviscosa =

Scientific classification
- Kingdom: Plantae
- Clade: Tracheophytes
- Clade: Angiosperms
- Clade: Eudicots
- Clade: Asterids
- Order: Gentianales
- Family: Rubiaceae
- Genus: Houstonia
- Species: H. subviscosa

Binomial name
- Houstonia subviscosa (C.Wright ex A.Gray) A.Gray

Synonyms
- Oldenlandia subviscosa C.Wright ex A.Gray; Hedyotis subviscosa (C.Wright ex A.Gray) Shinners

Species of plant

Houstonia subviscosa, the nodding bluet, is a plant species in the Rubiaceae. It is native to Texas.
