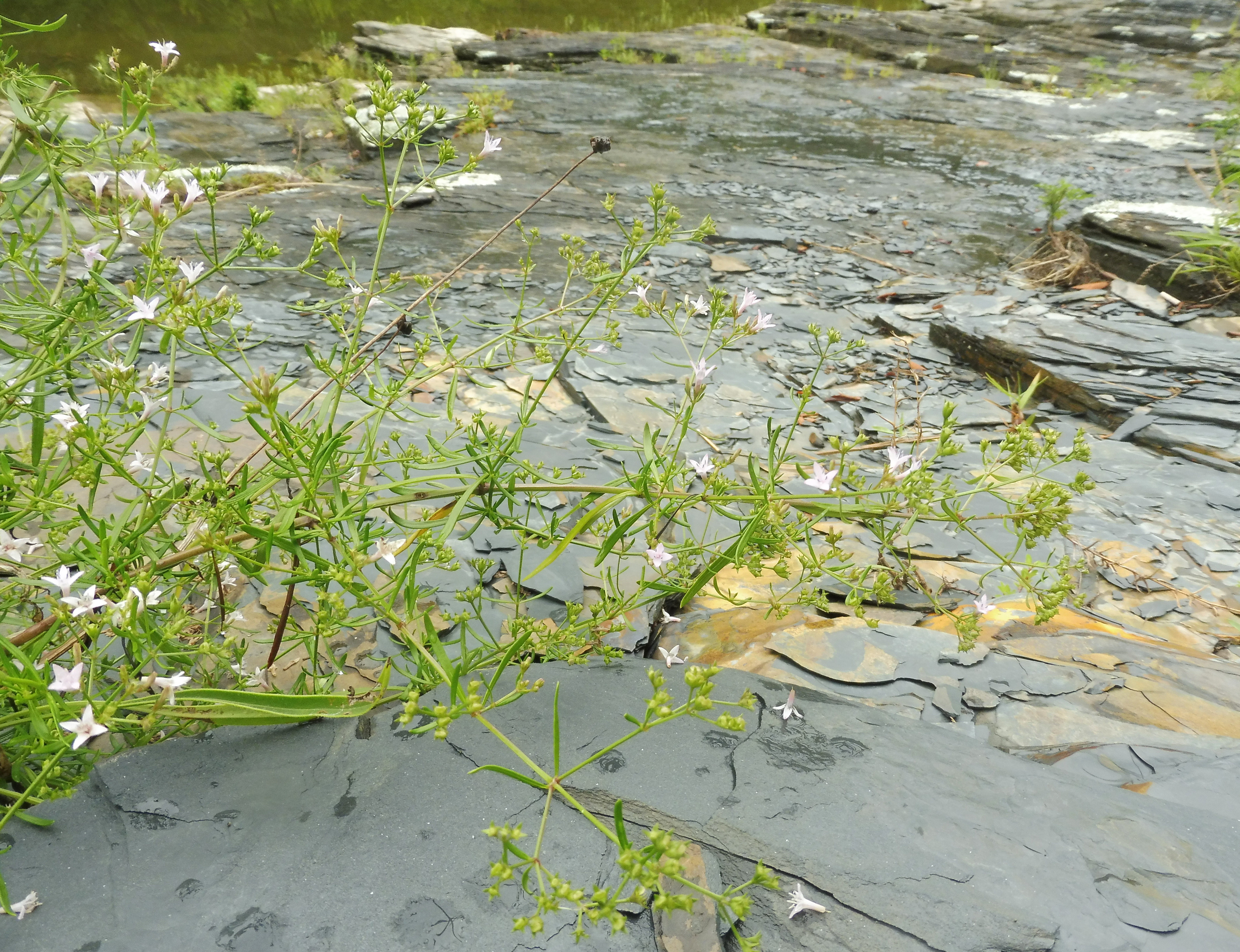
- Stenaria nigricans

Scientific classification
- Kingdom: Plantae
- Clade: Tracheophytes
- Clade: Angiosperms
- Clade: Eudicots
- Clade: Asterids
- Order: Gentianales
- Family: Rubiaceae
- Subfamily: Rubioideae
- Tribe: Spermacoceae
- Genus: Stenaria (Raf.) Terrell

Type species
- Stenaria nigricans (Lam.) Terrell

Species
- Around 6, see text

= Stenaria =

Genus of plants

Stenaria is a genus of flowering plants in the family Rubiaceae. It is a small genus, consisting of around six species native to the United States, Mexico, and The Bahamas. All species of Stenaria are restricted to Mexico and the southwestern United States, except for the wide-ranging Stenaria nigricans which extends northward and eastward.

Stenaria are herbaceous perennials or low shrubs. Flowers are produced in cymes, and can be white, purple, or pink. Stenaria can be morphologically distinguished from the similar genus Hedyotis by its non-crateriform seeds.

Stenaria was first recognized as a genus in 2001. It comprises species formerly classified as Hedyotis or Houstonia.

== Species ==
- Stenaria butterwickiae
- Stenaria mullerae
- Stenaria nigricans
- Stenaria rupicola
- Stenaria sanchezii
- Stenaria umbratilis
- Stenaria pooleana
