= Houstonia palmeri =

Scientific classification
- Kingdom: Plantae
- Clade: Tracheophytes
- Clade: Angiosperms
- Clade: Eudicots
- Clade: Asterids
- Order: Gentianales
- Family: Rubiaceae
- Genus: Houstonia
- Species: H. palmeri

Binomial name
- Houstonia palmeri A.Gray

Species of plant

Houstonia palmeri, the Saltillo bluet, is a plant species in the family Rubiaceae, native to the Mexican states of Coahuila and Nuevo León.

Two varieties are recognized:

- Houstonia palmeri var. palmeri
- Houstonia palmeri var. muzquizana (B.L.Turner) Terrell
