= Houstonia croftiae =

Scientific classification
- Kingdom: Plantae
- Clade: Tracheophytes
- Clade: Angiosperms
- Clade: Eudicots
- Clade: Asterids
- Order: Gentianales
- Family: Rubiaceae
- Genus: Houstonia
- Species: H. croftiae

Binomial name
- Houstonia croftiae Britton & Rusby

Synonyms
- Hedyotis croftiae (Britton & Rusby) Shinners

Species of plant

Houstonia croftiae, the South Texas bluet or Croft's bluet, is a species of plants in the family Rubiaceae. It is known only from 9 counties in southern Texas: Hidalgo, Starr, Zapata, Webb, La Salle, Duval, Jim Wells, Refugio and San Patricio).
