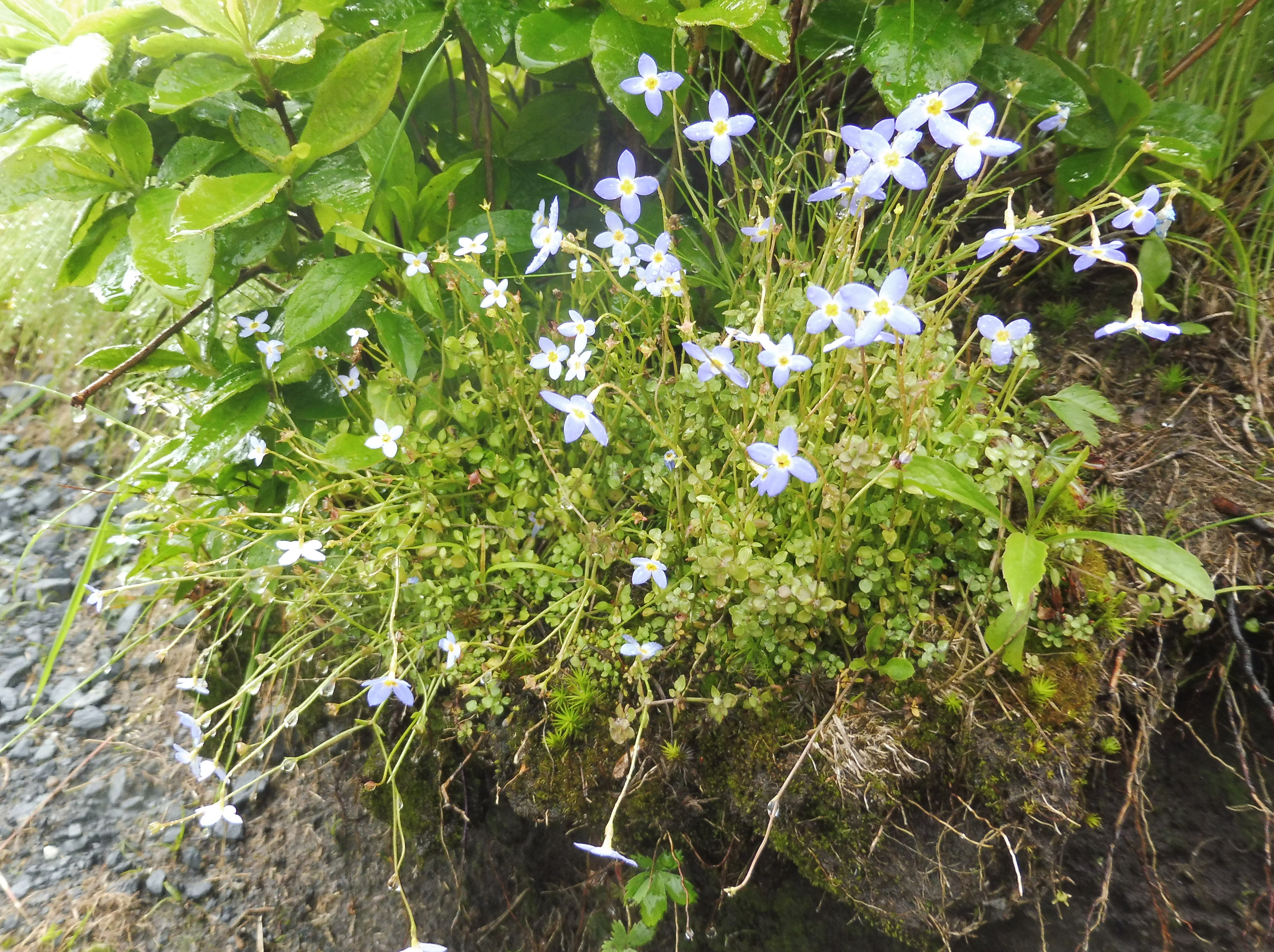

Scientific classification
- Kingdom: Plantae
- Clade: Tracheophytes
- Clade: Angiosperms
- Clade: Eudicots
- Clade: Asterids
- Order: Gentianales
- Family: Rubiaceae
- Genus: Houstonia
- Species: H. serpyllifolia

Binomial name
- Houstonia serpyllifolia Michx.

Synonyms
- Anotis serpyllifolia (Michx.) G.Don; Hedyotis serpyllifolia (Michx.) Torr. & A.Gray; Oldenlandia serpyllifolia (Michx.) A.Gray; Houstonia tenella Pursh; Anotis tenella (Pursh) G.Don; Houstonia serpyllifolia f. alba Alexander; Hedyotis michauxii Fosberg; Hedyotis michauxii f. alba (Alexander) Fosberg

= Houstonia serpyllifolia =

Species of plant

Houstonia serpyllifolia, commonly called thymeleaf bluet, creeping bluet, mountain bluet, Appalachian bluet or Michaux's bluets is a species of plant in the coffee family (Rubiaceae). It is native to the eastern United States, where it is found in the central and southern Appalachian Mountains. It has been documented in the states of Pennsylvania, Maryland, West Virginia, western Virginia, North Carolina, South Carolina, Kentucky, Tennessee, Ohio, and northeastern Georgia.

Houstonia serpyllifolia is a low creeping perennial. It produces solitary, terminal blue flowers in spring and early summer. It typically grows in moist areas, and is found habitats such as streambanks, mesic woods, grassy balds, seepy rock outcrops, and spray cliffs.

The specific epithet "serpyllifolia" alludes to the resemblance between this plant and the culinary herb wild thyme, Thymus serpyllum.
