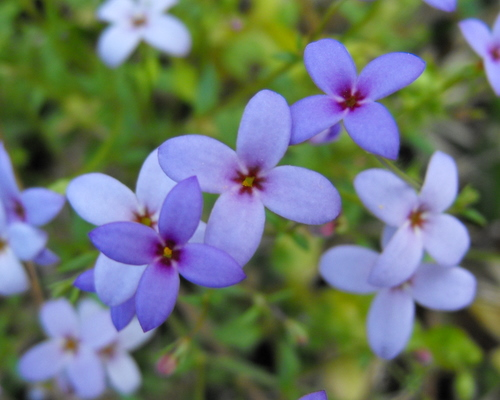

Conservation status
- Secure (NatureServe)

Scientific classification
- Kingdom: Plantae
- Clade: Tracheophytes
- Clade: Angiosperms
- Clade: Eudicots
- Clade: Asterids
- Order: Gentianales
- Family: Rubiaceae
- Genus: Houstonia
- Species: H. pusilla

Binomial name
- Houstonia pusilla Schöpf

= Houstonia pusilla =

Species of plant

Houstonia pusilla (tiny bluet) is a plant in the family Rubiaceae native to the United States and common in the southeastern and central parts of the country, from Texas to Florida north to Long Island and South Dakota, plus an isolated population in Pima County, Arizona.

Houstonia pusilla is a short plant 6 inches (150 mm) or less in height with a tiny blue toned, yellow centered four lobed flower with a 0.25–0.33 inches (6.4–8.4 mm) diameter. The plant has a center rosette form and green herbaceous foliage with leaves up to 0.5 inches (13 mm) long. The leaves are opposite and each flower grows from a single branch growing from the leaf axil. This plant requires full sun and blooms in spring and early summer. It is a groundcover multiplying by self sowing and grows in mildly acidic soil where the grass is thin and moisture is adequate to support the plant. Its habitats include dry open places, rocky ledges, granite glades, and outcrops.
