= Blewett, Washington =

Ghost town in Washington (state)

- Ghost town
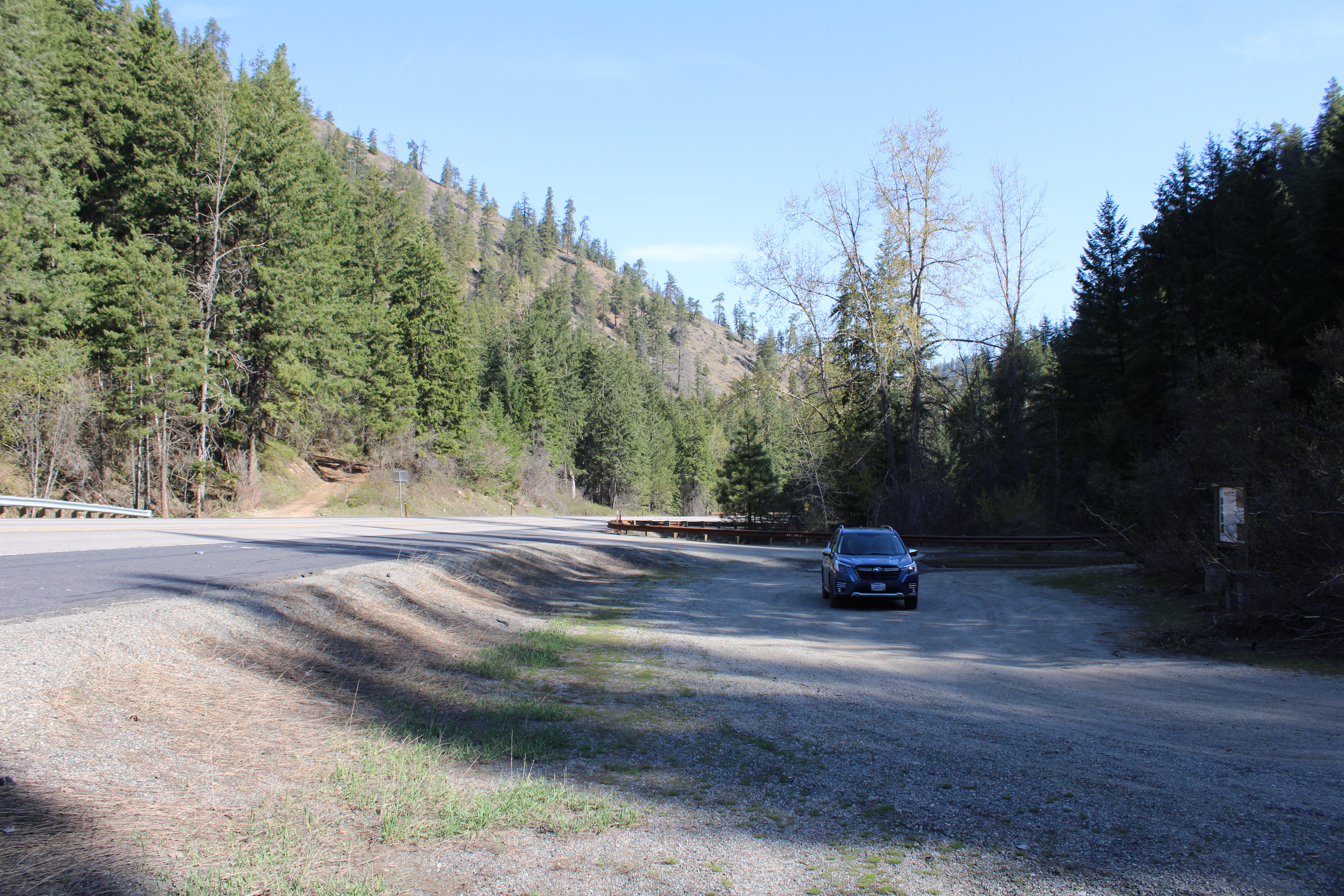
- Blewett townsite

- Location within Washington (state) Location within the United States
- Coordinates: 47°25′23″N 120°39′33″W
- Country: United States
- State: Washington
- County: Chelan
- Established: 1893 (as Werner)
- Time zone: UTC-8 (Pacific (PST))
  - Summer (DST): UTC-7 (PDT)

Blewett is a ghost town in Chelan County, Washington, United States. The small mining town was established on the west side of Peshastin Creek in the foothills of the Wenatchee Mountains in the mid-1870s.

The first mining claims were filed in 1874, and a stamp mill followed by 1878. A wagon road to Cle Elum was completed in 1879. The community was originally called Werner with the establishment of a post office in 1893, but the name was changed to Blewett a year later. It was named after Edward Blewett of Seattle, whose mining company owned many of the claims in the area. A road to Peshastin was completed in 1896, and a stage ran three days a week. During this time the town boasted a school, a two-story hotel, stores, a saloon and telegraph service. The mill ceased operations in 1905 when the main vein of ore ran out.

The Stamp Mill remains along with several small, scattered buildings. A few mines are still accessible, but care must be taken when exploring. The town's location is designated by a listing on a US-97 roadside marker. There is a parking area and information sign.

== History ==
John Shafer located first quartz claim in 1874 near the head of Culver gulch. Shortly after, the Pole Pick, and the Hummingbird, were begun. Soon the Bobtail, John Olden and Peter Wilder the Fraction, and the Little Culver were begun. Following the same lead eastward the Peshastin and Blackjack claims were located. On the east side of Peshastin creek, the Golden Chariot and Tiptop claims were established. West of Culver gulch, down into Etienne (Negro at the time) creek, were the Shafer, Vancouver and Seattle mines of Marshall Blinn. These were purchased by the Cascade Mining Company. Additionally, locations on the Pole Pick and the North Star ledges defined an east–west mineralized zone.

The area was served by a trail until 1879 when a wagon road was built from Cle Elum, over Blewett Pass. The ore came from a quartz, which being oxidized required only milling to separate the gold. Initially, arrastras were built for crushing the ores. Two remained in used and ceased operation before 1911. Late in the seventies a six-stamp mill was built that operated by waterpower. This mill served the upper Culver gulch tunnels for eight years. In 1891 a ten-stamp mill was erected by the Culver Mining Company. The Blewett Mining Company bought it in 1892 and resold it in 1896 to Thomas Johnson. This mill served the Pole Pick, Tip Top, Blackjack, Peshastin, and claims on the ridge between Culver and Culver Springs gulches. By 1896, Blewett Mining built the twenty-stamp mill at the mouth of Culver gulch and began a systematic underground development of the property. From 1894 to 1897 Blewett Minning would leasing portions of the mines for a royalty fee, opening the upper portion of the gulch. In 1896 the Warrior General Company was organized and purchased Blewett Minning Companies property for $35,000. Warrior General reorganized and became the Chelan Mining and Milling Company. At time the Peshastin ore was being accessed by driving a series of south crosscuts from Culver gulch. These rich ore bodies increased the activity of the Blewett district. In 1905 this and the La Rica joined as the Washington Meteor Company. The mines remained active through 1911.
