= Houstonia canadensis =

Scientific classification
- Kingdom: Plantae
- Clade: Tracheophytes
- Clade: Angiosperms
- Clade: Eudicots
- Clade: Asterids
- Order: Gentianales
- Family: Rubiaceae
- Genus: Houstonia
- Species: H. canadensis

Binomial name
- Houstonia canadensis Willd. ex Roem. & Schult.

Synonyms
- Hedyotis canadensis (Willd. ex Roem. & Schult.) Fosberg; Houstonia heterophylla Raf.; Houstonia oblongifolia Raf.; Houstonia obtusifolia Raf.; Houstonia ciliolata Torr.; Houstonia longifolia var. ciliolata (Torr.) Alph.Wood; Houstonia quonochauntaugensis B.Golemb.; Houstonia purpurea var. ciliolata (Torr.) A.Gray; Chamisme ciliolata (Torr.) Nieuwl.; Houstonia setiscaphia L.G.Carr; Hedyotis purpurea var. ciliolata (Torr.) Fosberg; Hedyotis purpurea var. setiscaphia (L.G.Carr) Fosberg; Houstonia canadensis var. setiscaphia (L.G.Carr) C.F.Reed

Species of plant

Houstonia canadensis, common name Canadian summer bluet, is a plant species native to the United States and Canada. It has been reported from Ontario, Saskatchewan, New York, Pennsylvania, Ohio, Indiana, Illinois, Michigan, Kentucky, Missouri, Tennessee, West Virginia, western Virginia, and mountainous regions of western North Carolina, western South Carolina, and northern Georgia.
