= Houstonia acerosa =

Scientific classification
- Kingdom: Plantae
- Clade: Tracheophytes
- Clade: Angiosperms
- Clade: Eudicots
- Clade: Asterids
- Order: Gentianales
- Family: Rubiaceae
- Genus: Houstonia
- Species: H. acerosa

Binomial name
- Houstonia acerosa (A.Gray) Benth. & Hook.f.

Synonyms
- Ereicoctis acerosa (A.Gray) Kuntze; Hedyotis acerosa A.Gray; Hedyotis acerosa var. potosina B.L.Turner; Hedyotis polypremoides var. bigelovii Greenm.; Mallostoma acerosum (A.Gray) Hemsl.; Oldenlandia acerosa (A.Gray) A.Gray

Species of plant

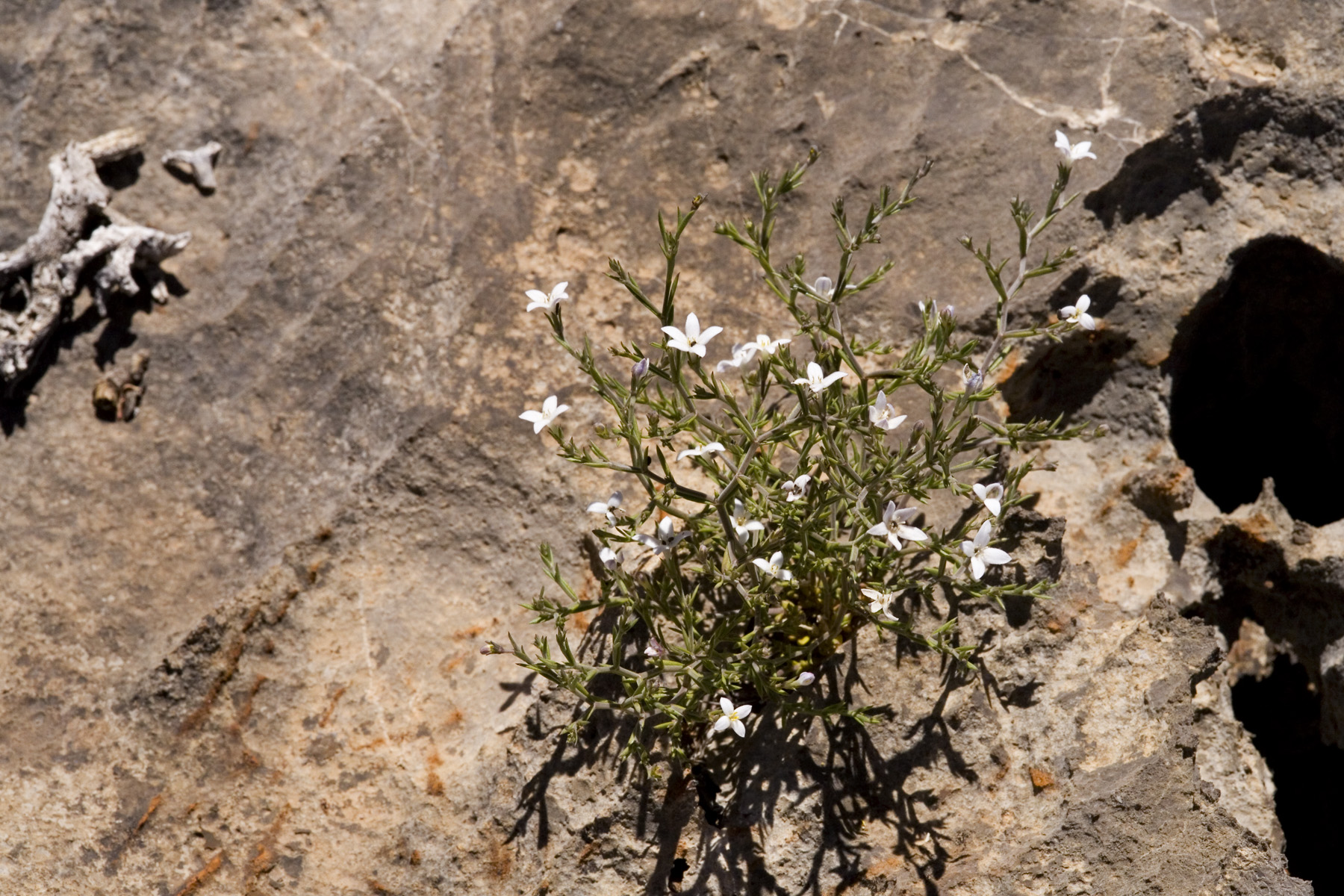
Houstonia acerosa habit, New Mexico

Houstonia acerosa, the New Mexico bluet or needleleaf bluet, is a plant species native to Chihuahua, Coahuila, Nuevo León, Tamaulipas, San Luis Potosí, Texas and New Mexico.

Houstonia acerosa is an herb up to 20 cm tall, with narrow needle-like leaves and white or purplish flowers.

== Varieties ==
Three varieties of the species are widely accepted:

- Houstonia acerosa var. acerosa - Coahuila, Nuevo León, Tamaulipas, San Luis Potosí, Texas
- Houstonia acerosa var. polypremoides (A.Gray) Terrell - Chihuahua, Coahuila, New Mexico, trans-Pecos Texas
- Houstonia acerosa var. tamaulipana (B.L.Turner) Terrell - Tamaulipas
