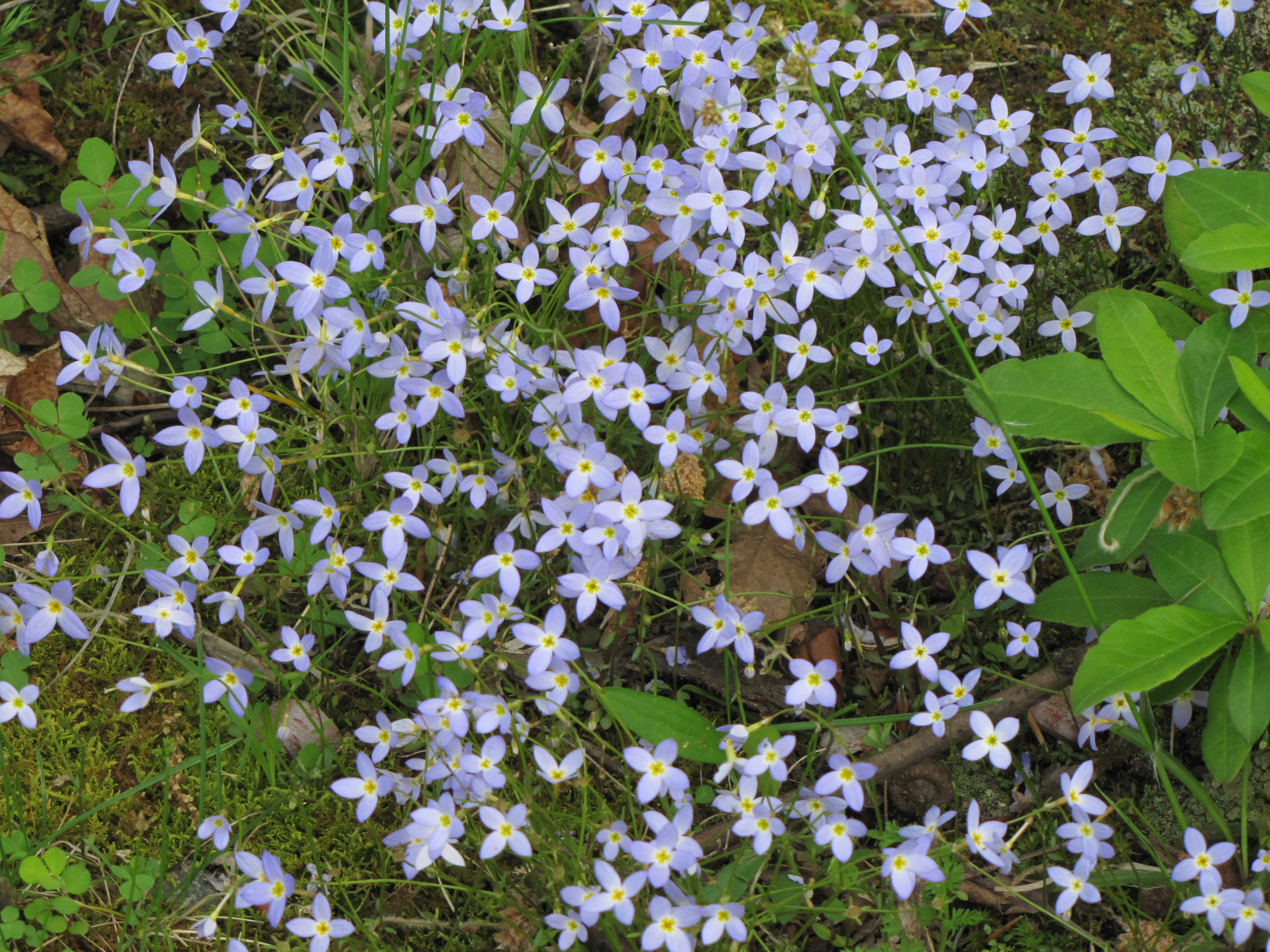

Scientific classification
- Kingdom: Plantae
- Clade: Tracheophytes
- Clade: Angiosperms
- Clade: Eudicots
- Clade: Asterids
- Order: Gentianales
- Family: Rubiaceae
- Genus: Houstonia
- Species: H. caerulea

Binomial name
- Houstonia caerulea L.

Synonyms
- Hedyotis caerulea Hook.; Houstonia coerulea Auct.

= Houstonia caerulea =

Species of plant

Houstonia caerulea, commonly known as azure bluet, Quaker ladies, or bluets, is a perennial species in the family Rubiaceae. It is native to eastern Canada (Ontario to Newfoundland) and the eastern United States (Maine to Wisconsin, south to Florida and Louisiana, with scattered populations in Oklahoma). It is found in a variety of habitats such as cliffs, alpine zones, forests, meadows and shores of rivers or lakes.

== Description ==
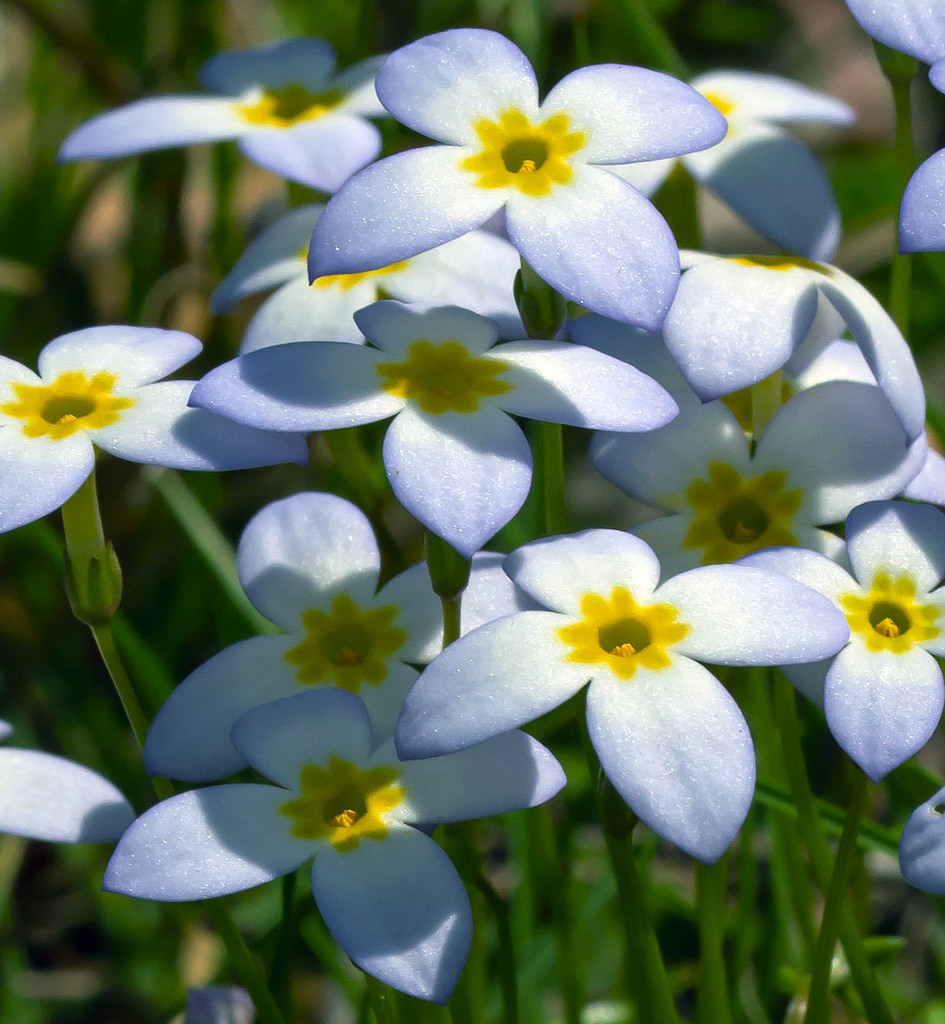
Azure bluet (Houstonia caerulea) in Pennsylvania, close-up

Houstonia caerulea is a perennial herb that produces showy flowers approximately 1 cm (0.39 in) across. These flowers are four-parted with pale blue petals and a yellow center. The foliage is a basal rosette with spatula-shaped leaves. Stems are up to 20 cm (7.9 in) tall with one flower per stalk. Leaves are simple and opposite in arrangement with two leaves per node along the stem. It thrives in moist acidic soils in shady areas, growing especially well among grasses.

== Gallery ==
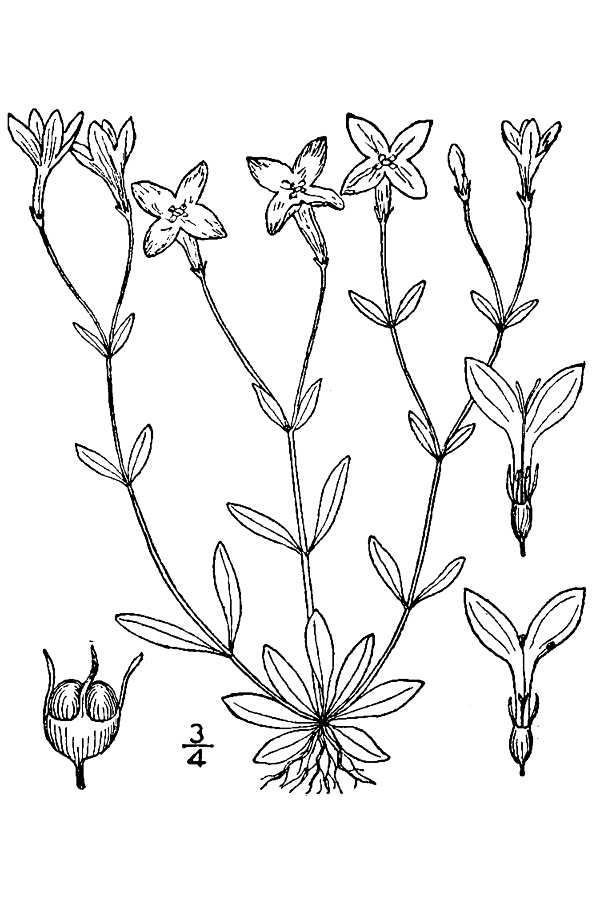

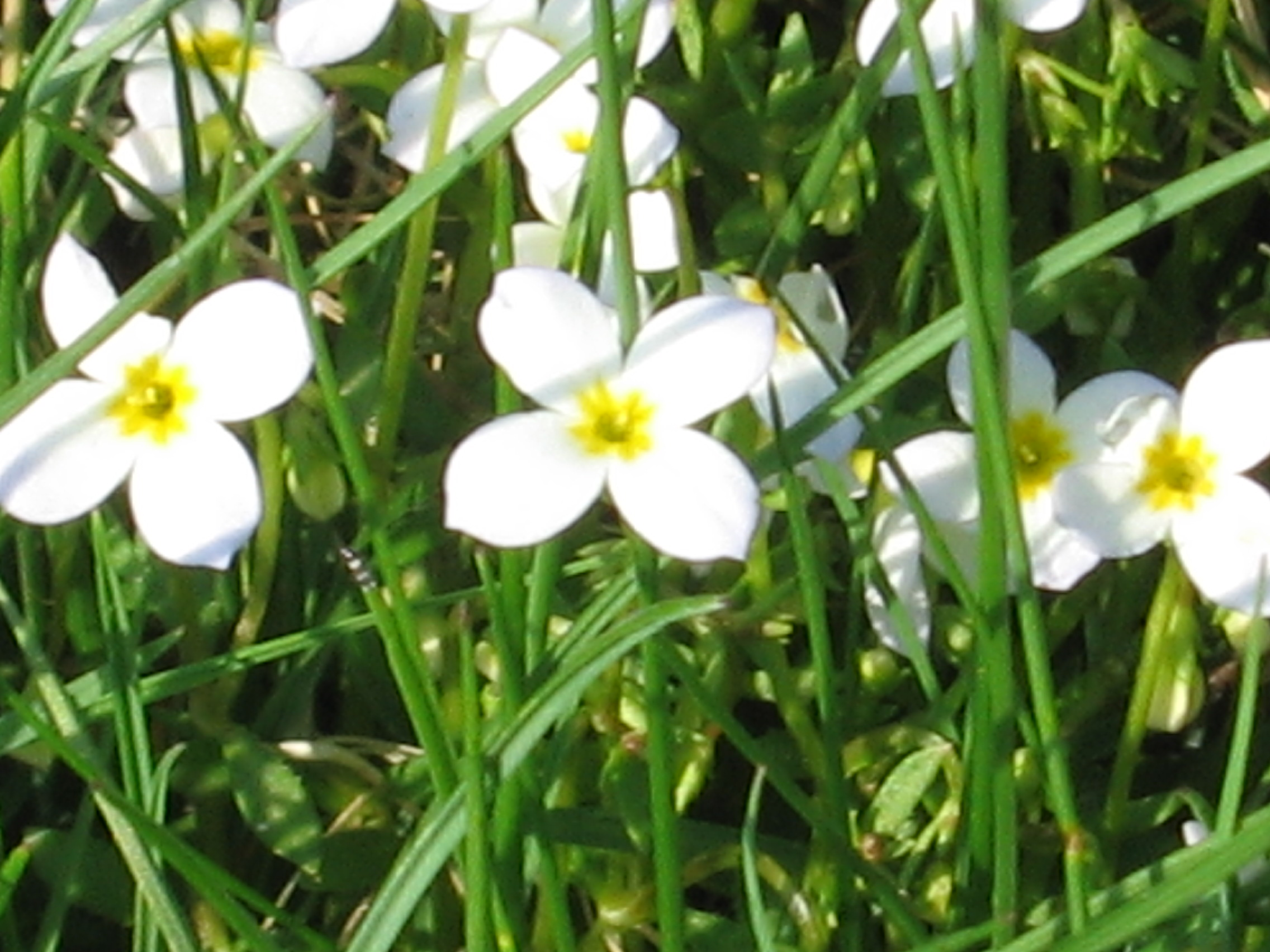

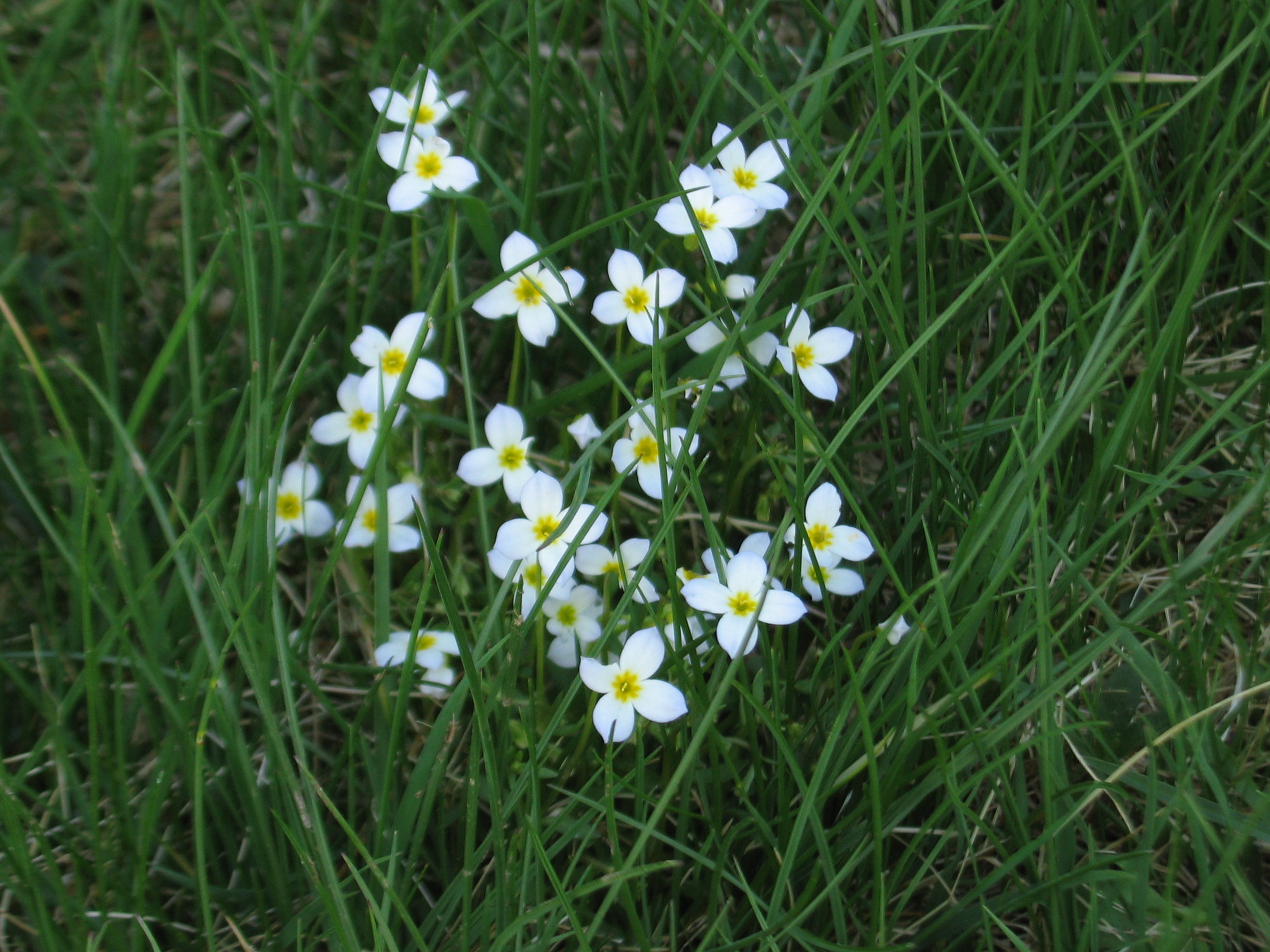

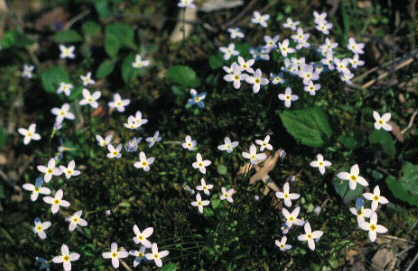
