= Houstonia sharpii =

Scientific classification
- Kingdom: Plantae
- Clade: Tracheophytes
- Clade: Angiosperms
- Clade: Eudicots
- Clade: Asterids
- Order: Gentianales
- Family: Rubiaceae
- Genus: Houstonia
- Species: H. sharpii

Binomial name
- Houstonia sharpii Terrell

Synonyms
- Hedyotis sharpii (Terrell) G.L.Nesom

Species of plant

Houstonia sharpii, the Hidalgo bluet, is a plant species in the family Rubiaceae. It is a herbaceous perennial up to 30 cm tall, spreading by means of stolons spreading along the surface of the ground. It also has white flowers. It is native to the states of Hidalgo, Puebla and Veracruz in Mexico.
