= Houstonia rosea =

Scientific classification
- Kingdom: Plantae
- Clade: Tracheophytes
- Clade: Angiosperms
- Clade: Eudicots
- Clade: Asterids
- Order: Gentianales
- Family: Rubiaceae
- Genus: Houstonia
- Species: H. rosea

Binomial name
- Houstonia rosea (Raf.) Terrell

Synonyms
- Hedyotis rosea Raf. 1817; Hedyotis minima f. albiflora Lathrop; Hedyotis taylorae Fosberg ex Shinners; Houstonia minor var. pusilla (A.Gray) Small; Houstonia patens var. pusilla A.Gray; Houstonia pygmaea C.H.Müll. & M.T.Mull.

Species of plant

Houstonia rosea, the rose bluet, is a North American plant species in the coffee family. It is a tiny plant only a few centimeters tall, with pink flowers. It is native to the south-central United States: Texas, Oklahoma, Arkansas, Louisiana, Mississippi, Alabama and southern Missouri.
