= Houstonia correllii =

Scientific classification
- Kingdom: Plantae
- Clade: Tracheophytes
- Clade: Angiosperms
- Clade: Eudicots
- Clade: Asterids
- Order: Gentianales
- Family: Rubiaceae
- Genus: Houstonia
- Species: H. correllii

Binomial name
- Houstonia correllii (W.H.Lewis) Terrell
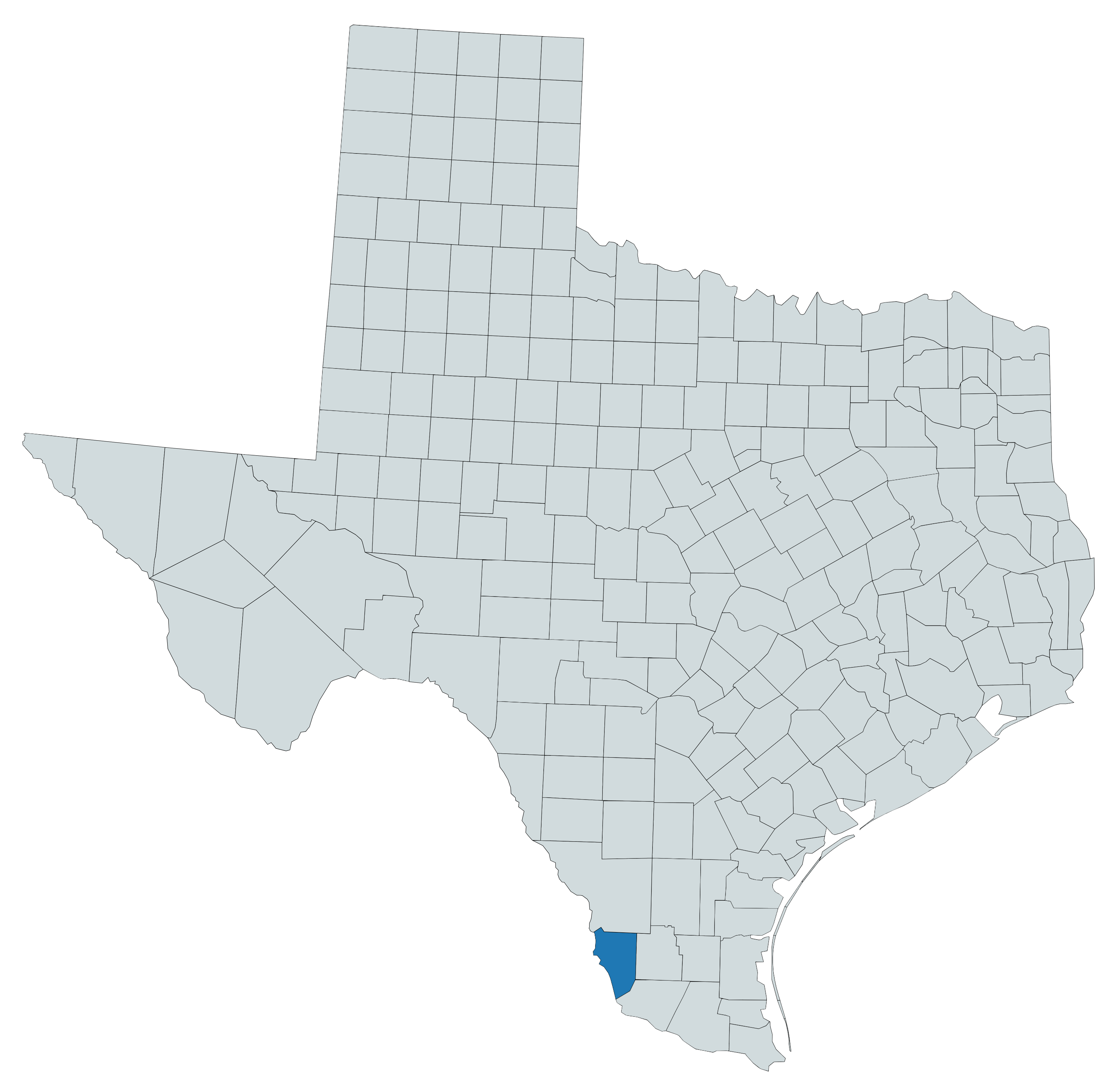
- Range of Houstonia correllii

Synonyms
- Hedyotis correllii W.H. Lewis

Species of plant

Houstonia correllii, the Zapata County bluet, or Correll's bluet, is a species of plants in the Rubiaceae. It is known only from Zapata County in southern Texas. It is a prostrate, mat-forming plant with white flowers.
