= Houstonia spellenbergii =

Scientific classification
- Kingdom: Plantae
- Clade: Tracheophytes
- Clade: Angiosperms
- Clade: Eudicots
- Clade: Asterids
- Order: Gentianales
- Family: Rubiaceae
- Genus: Houstonia
- Species: H. spellenbergii

Binomial name
- Houstonia spellenbergii (G.L.Nesom & Vorobik) Terrell

Synonyms
- Hedyotis spellenbergii G.L.Nesom & Vorobik

Species of plant

Houstonia spellenbergii is a plant species in the family Rubiaceae. It is native to the western part of the state of Chihuahua in northern Mexico, at an elevation of approximately 2100 m in the Sierra Madre Occidental near the Basaseáchic waterfall.
