= Mary Blewett =

American historian

Mary H. Blewett (born 1938) is an author and academic specializing in American social history, women's history, and labor history. She is an emeritus professor at the University of Massachusetts Lowell, having retired in 1999 after 36 years. She is the author or co-author of six academic monographs and numerous articles as well as two novels.

== Early life ==
She was a lifelong friend of Gabriele Annan. They met at a progressive boarding school in England.

== Education ==
Blewett received her B.A, M.A., and Ph.D. degrees at the University of Missouri.

== Career ==
Blewett arrived in Lowell in 1965, initially joining the History Department at Lowell State College, later to become the University of Massachusetts Lowell. In the 1970s, Blewett became increasingly involved with community history projects in the Merrimack Valley, including with the creation of the Lowell National Historical Park and associated oral history projects. In 1976, Blewett co-founded, together with Joan Rothschild, the Women's Studies Program at the University of Massachusetts Lowell. From 1976 to 1978, Blewett served as the first female president of the Lowell Historical Society.

Upon her retirement, the History Department at the University of Massachusetts Lowell named an annual prize for student a research paper in Blewett's honor.

== Select Publications ==
=== Academic Monographs ===
- 1989, Men, Women and Work: Class, Gender, and Protest in the New England Shoe Industry, 1780-1910, University of Illinois Press.
- 1990, The Last Generation: Work and Life in the Textile Mills of Lowell, Massachusetts, 1910-1960 and Constant Turmoil: The Politics of Industrial Life in Nineteenth Century New England, University of Massachusetts Press.
- 1991, We Will Rise in Our Might: Working Women's Voices from Nineteenth-Century New England (Documents in American Social History), Cornell University Press
- 1995, (co-author with Christine McKenna) To Enrich and to Serve: The Centennial History of the University of Massachusetts, Lowell
- 2000, Constant Turmoil: The Politics of Industrial Life in Nineteenth-Century New England, University of Massachusetts Press.
- 2009, The Yankee Yorkshireman: Migration Lived and Imagined (Studies of World Migrations), University of Illinois Press.

=== Novels ===
- 2014, Dealt Hands: A Novel of the Seventies, CF Publishing Group
- 2018, The Unforeseen, Archway Publishing

== Awards ==
Blewett's Men, Women and Work won, together with Joan Wallach Scott, the 1989 Joan Kelly Memorial Prize in Women's History by the American Historical Association, the 1989 Herbert G. Gutman Award for outstanding dissertation, and the New England Historical Association Book Award, 1989. She also lectured for twenty years at various museums and historical societies in Massachusetts.
