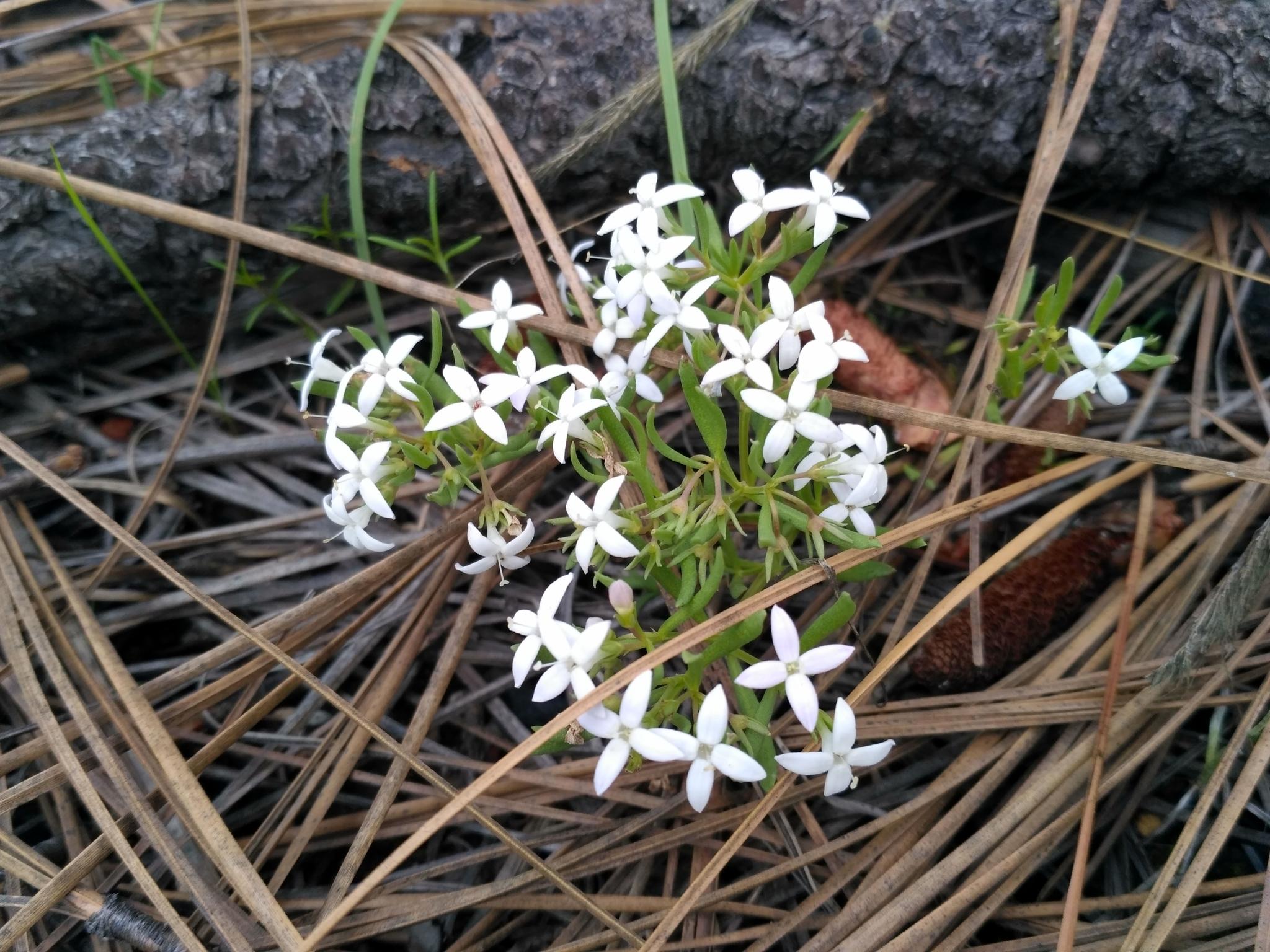

Scientific classification
- Kingdom: Plantae
- Clade: Tracheophytes
- Clade: Angiosperms
- Clade: Eudicots
- Clade: Asterids
- Order: Gentianales
- Family: Rubiaceae
- Genus: Houstonia
- Species: H. wrightii

Binomial name
- Houstonia wrightii A.Gray

Synonyms
- Hedyotis wrightii (A.Gray) Fosberg; Hedyotis pumila Willd. ex Roem. & Schult.; Hedyotis pygmaea Roem. & Schult; Hedyotis cervantesii Kunth; Anotis cervantesii (Kunth) DC.; Houstonia humifusa Hemsl.; Ereicoctis cervantesii (Kunth) Kuntze

= Houstonia wrightii =

Species of plant

Houstonia wrightii, the pygmy bluet, is a plant species in the Rubiaceae. It is native to the south-western United States (Arizona, New Mexico, western Texas) and northern Mexico (Chihuahua, Sonora, Hidalgo).
