= Houstonia teretifolia =

Scientific classification
- Kingdom: Plantae
- Clade: Tracheophytes
- Clade: Angiosperms
- Clade: Eudicots
- Clade: Asterids
- Order: Gentianales
- Family: Rubiaceae
- Genus: Houstonia
- Species: H. teretifolia

Binomial name
- Houstonia teretifolia Terrell

Synonyms
- Hedyotis teretifolia (Terrell) G.L.Nesom

Species of plant

Houstonia teretifolia is a plant species in the family Rubiaceae, endemic to the Mexican state of Coahuila.

Houstonia teretifolia is distinguished by other species in the genus by having leaves that are terete, i.e., long and narrow, round in cross-section.
