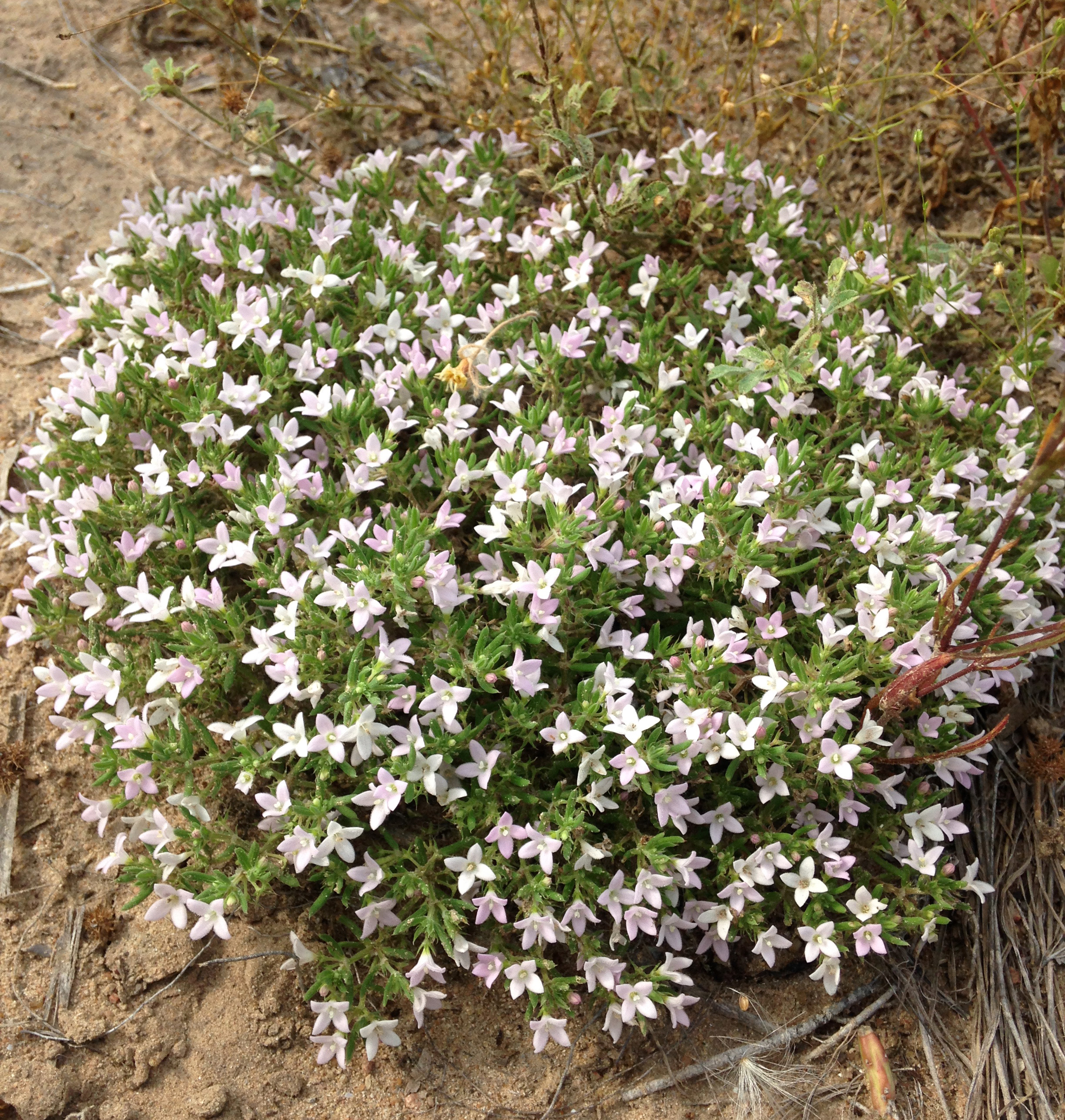

Scientific classification
- Kingdom: Plantae
- Clade: Tracheophytes
- Clade: Angiosperms
- Clade: Eudicots
- Clade: Asterids
- Order: Gentianales
- Family: Rubiaceae
- Genus: Houstonia
- Species: H. humifusa

Binomial name
- Houstonia humifusa (Engelm. ex A.Gray) A.Gray

Synonyms
- Hedyotis humifusa Engelm. ex A.Gray; Oldenlandia humifusa (Engelm. ex A.Gray) A.Gray

= Houstonia humifusa =

Species of plant

Houstonia humifusa, commonly called matted bluet, is a plant species in the coffee family (Rubiaceae). It is native to the United States, where it is found in Texas, Oklahoma, and New Mexico. It is typically found in sandy areas, or sometimes over gypsum.

Houstonia humifusa is an herbaceous annual, growing to around 15 cm tall. It produces light pink and purple flowers in spring and early summer.
