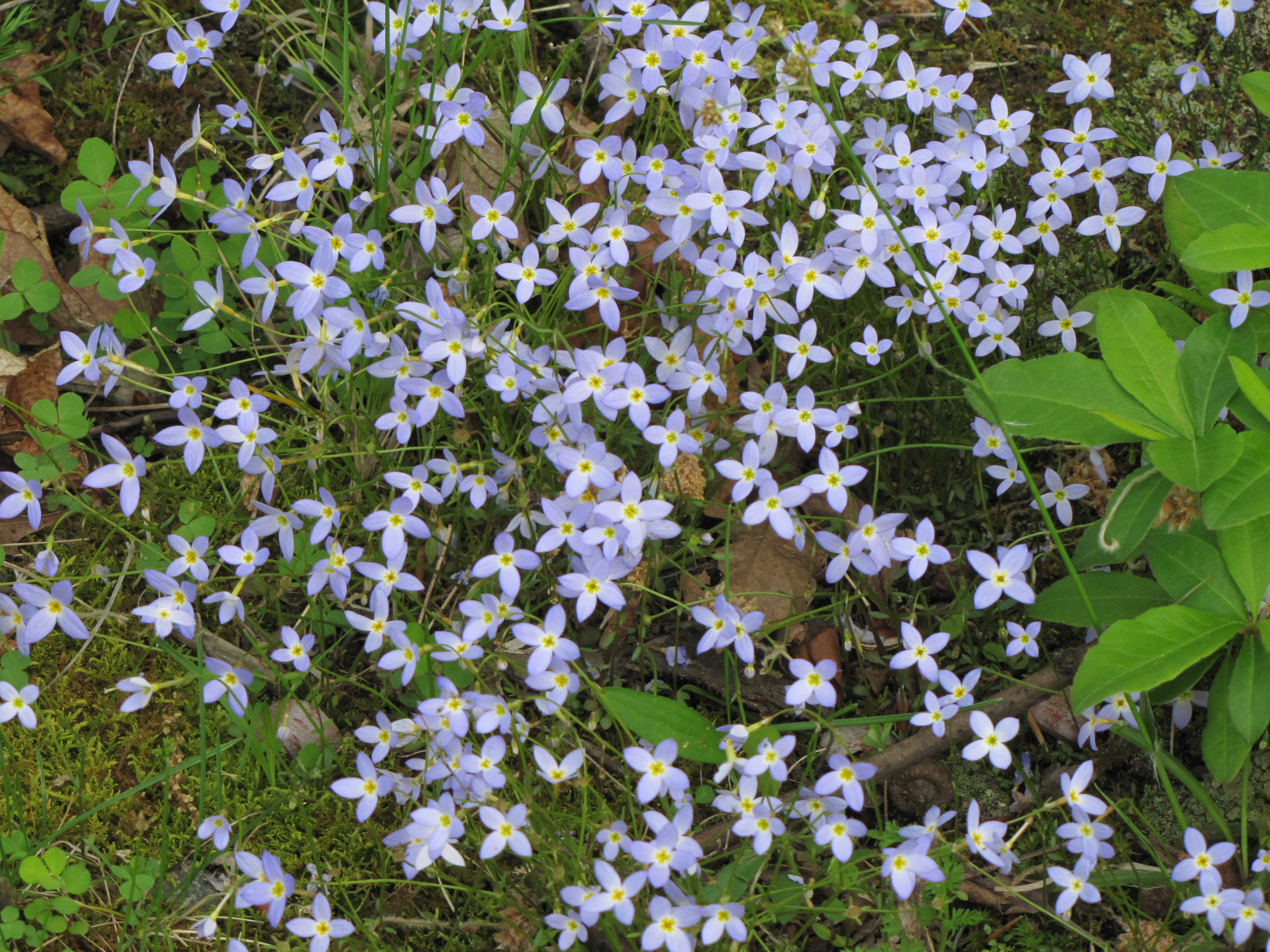
- Houstonia caerulea

Scientific classification
- Kingdom: Plantae
- Clade: Tracheophytes
- Clade: Angiosperms
- Clade: Eudicots
- Clade: Asterids
- Order: Gentianales
- Family: Rubiaceae
- Subfamily: Rubioideae
- Tribe: Spermacoceae
- Genus: Houstonia; L.

Synonyms
- Poiretia J.F.Gmel. non Vent.; Panetos Raf.; Chamisme Nieuwl.

= Houstonia (plant) =

Genus of flowering plants

Houstonia (bluet) is a genus of plants in the family Rubiaceae. Many species were formerly classified, along with other genera since segregated elsewhere, in a more inclusive genus Hedyotis.

Bluets are often small and delicate. For example, H. rosea may grow only one inch tall. Some species are single stemmed and others have multiple stems in bunches. Flowers are blue, purple, lavender, white, or rose, often with shades of one color present in an individual population. Flowers have 4 sepals, colloquially denominated "petals", a salverform corolla with 4 lobes, and an inferior ovary. Some species exhibit heterostyly. The fruit is an often roughly cordate capsule enclosing many seeds and which usually dehisces via a suture across its apex.

Houstonia consists of 20 species native to North America. Another 5 species are classified in the genus Stenaria; Houstonia without Stenaria is paraphyletic. Close relatives of the genus are Oldenlandia microtheca and, more distantly, Arcytophyllum.

Its members superficially resembles species of the genus Myosotis (Forget-me-nots), but are distinguished from the latter by having only 4 sepals (petals) instead of 5.

== Species ==
Species accepted as of May 2014 are:

- Houstonia acerosa (A.Gray) Benth. & Hook.f.: Chihuahua, Coahuila, Nuevo León, Tamaulipas, and San Luis Potosí and Texas and New Mexico, United States
- Houstonia biloba Raf.
- Houstonia caerulea L. (azure bluet): eastern Canada and eastern United States
- Houstonia canadensis Willd. ex Roem. & Schult. (Canadian summer bluet): Ontario and Saskatchewan, Canada and eastern United States
- Houstonia cervantesii Terrell
- Houstonia chlorantha Bertol.
- Houstonia correllii (W.H.Lewis) Terrell (Correll's bluet): Texas, United States
- Houstonia croftiae Britton & Rusby (Croft's bluet): Texas, United States
- Houstonia humifusa (Engelm. ex A.Gray) A.Gray (matted bluet): New Mexico, Oklahoma, and Texas, United States
- Houstonia longifolia Gaertn. (longleaf summer bluet): eastern and central United States and central Canada
- Houstonia micrantha (Shinners) Terrell (southern bluet): central and southeastern United States
- Houstonia nuttalliana Fosberg
- Houstonia ochroleuca Raf.
- Houstonia ouachitana (E.B.Sm.) Terrell (Ouachita bluet): Arkansas and Oklahoma, United States
- Houstonia palmeri A.Gray: Coahuila and Nuevo León
- Houstonia parviflora Holz. ex Greenm. (Greenman's bluet): Texas, United States
- Houstonia procumbens (J.F.Gmel.) Standl. (roundleaf bluet): Louisiana, Mississippi, Alabama, Georgia, Florida, and South Carolina, United States
- Houstonia prostata Brandegee
- Houstonia purpurea L. (Venus' pride): eastern and central United States
- Houstonia pusilla Schöpf (tiny bluet): central and southeastern United States and Arizona, United States
- Houstonia reticulata Raf.
- Houstonia rosea (Raf.) Terrell (rose bluet): south-central United States
- Houstonia rubra Cav. (red bluet): northern and central Mexico as far south as Puebla and Arizona, New Mexico, Texas, and Utah, United States
- Houstonia serpyllifolia Michx. (creeping, mountain, thymeleaft, and Appalachian bluet): Appalachian Mountains from Pennsylvania to Georgia, United States
- Houstonia sharpii Terrell: Hidalgo and Veracruz
- Houstonia spellenbergii (G.L.Nesom & Vorobik) Terrell: Chihuahua
- Houstonia subviscosa (C.Wright ex A.Gray) A.Gray (nodding bluet): Texas, United States
- Houstonia teretifolia Terrell: Coahuila
- Houstonia wrightii A.Gray (pygmy bluet): Arizona, New Mexico, and Texas, United States and Mexico
