= Joan Rothschild =

American feminist scholar and political scientist

Joan Rothschild (1928/1927 – February 1, 2015) was an American feminist scholar and political scientist, known for her work on technology, reproductive ethics, and feminist theory. She was professor emerita at the University of Massachusetts Lowell and affiliated with the Center for Human Environments at the CUNY Graduate Center.

== Biography ==
Rothschild was born in New York City in either 1927 or 1928. She graduated with a B.A. in English from Cornell University in 1948 and later earned an M.A. in Political Science and a Ph.D. in Politics from New York University.

During the 1950s and 1960s, she became involved in civic and political activism in Greenwich Village, Manhattan. She worked on Adlai Stevenson II’s presidential campaigns, co-founded the 'Village Independent Democrats', opposed the extension of Fifth Avenue bus routes through Washington Square Park, and participated in the League of Women Voters. Rothschild died on February 1, 2015, on her 87th birthday.

== Academic work and contributions ==
In 1969, Rothschild joined the Program on Technology and Science at Harvard University. By 1972, she began teaching at Lowell Technological Institute (later merged into the University of Massachusetts Lowell), where taught political science and technology courses. In 1976, she co-founded Lowell’s Women’s Studies Program there with her colleague Mary Blewett, and later chaired the program. She later became professor emerita at UMass Lowell and was also a research associate at the Center for Human Environments at the Graduate Center of CUNY.

In her edited collection Machina Ex Dea: Feminist Perspectives on Technology (1983), Rothschild challenged the male-dominated history of technology and emphasized the importance of women’s roles and viewpoints in shaping technological development.

In The Dream of the Perfect Child (2005), she examined prenatal diagnosis and the pursuit of genetic “perfection.” She argued that these technologies risk conflating “healthy” with “perfect,” a cultural shift that could encourage the termination of pregnancies for minor or manageable genetic conditions and reinforce the societal devaluation of people with disabilities.

Earlier, she had also written Teaching Technology from a Feminist Perspective: A Practical Guide (1988), which provided both theoretical insights and pedagogical strategies for integrating feminist approaches into the teaching of technology.

In 1999, Joan Rothschild co-edited the anthology Design and Feminism: Re-Visioning Spaces, Places, and Everyday Things (Rutgers University Press), which gathered interdisciplinary essays from fields such as architecture, urban planning, industrial design, and graphic design. The book offers feminist critiques of conventional “one-size-fits-all” design standards, reexamining how cities, homes, tools, and public spaces are often shaped by assumptions that neglect diverse needs. It also proposes ideas, educational approaches, and practical projects aimed at fostering more inclusive and responsive design practices.
