= Joseph Blewett =

South African cricketer (1925–2013)

Personal information
- Born: 25 September 1925; Johannesburg, South Africa
- Died: 21 March 2013 (aged 87); Margate, KwaZulu-Natal, South Africa
- Source: ESPNcricinfo, 10 June 2016

Joseph Blewett (25 September 1925 – 21 March 2013) was a South African cricketer. He played first-class cricket for North Eastern Transvaal and Transvaal between 1950 and 1960.
