= Alexander (Zander) Blewett III =

American lawyer

Alexander (Zander) Blewett III (born 1945) is a Montana personal injury lawyer based out of Great Falls, Montana. The University of Montana School of Law is named for Blewett.

== Legal career ==
Blewett is the head partner in the Hoyt and Blewett PLLC, a personal injury law firm.

In the case of Seltzer v. Morton, a malicious prosecution and abuse of process lawsuit, Blewett obtained a $21.4 million verdict against the law firm of Gibson, Dunn & Crutcher. and other national publications. On appeal the Montana Supreme Court, 154 P.3d 561 (Mont. 2007), upheld $9.9 million of the jury's punitive damage award.

In 2015, Blewett obtained a $26 million settlement on behalf of a missionary who suffered a catastrophic brain injury in a car accident near Belgrade, Montana.

== Philanthropy ==
In 2015, Blewett donated $10 million to the University of Montana to rename its law school after himself, and to create a consumer law and protection program. He funded the construction of the Hoyt and Blewett Court Room at the law school, and provided $500,000 to Montana State University – Bozeman to improve facilities for its student-athletes.

== Family politics ==
Blewett's son, father, and grandfather have all served in the Montana House of Representatives. Blewett's father, Alex Blewett Jr., a Republican from Great Falls, served in the Montana House of Representatives as a Republican in 1961 and 1963. In 1963 he served as Republican Majority Leader of the State House. In 1964, he unsuccessfully challenged Democratic incumbent Mike Mansfield for the U.S. Senate. Blewett's Grandfather, Alexander Blewett Sr., a Republican from Butte, served in the Montana House of Representatives in 1931, 1943, 1945, 1947, and 1951. Blewett's son, Anders Blewett, a Democrat from Great Falls, was elected to the Montana House of Representatives in 2008 and the Montana Senate in 2010.
