= Kerry Blewett =

British canoeist

Kerry Blewett (born 1 February 1986, in Penzance) is a Cornish life guard who gained the acclaim of 'India's first female lifeguard in the late 2000s. In 2009, she was also selected as part of the British Sprint canoeing squad.
