= Edward Blewett =

English-American capitalist (1848-1929)

- Born: Edward Blewett; July 23, 1848; Camborne, Cornwall, England
- Died: July 18, 1929 (aged 81); Glendale, California, U.S.
- Resting place: Fremont, Nebraska, U.S.
- Occupation: Capitalist
- Spouse(s): Carrie Van Anda (m. 1870—1927; her death)

Edward Blewett (July 23, 1848 – July 18, 1929) was a capitalist, who notably owned several mines in the Western U.S. and Canada. He was born in Cornwall, in 1848, to William Blewett and Elizabeth Williams and came to the U.S. as an infant. During his childhood, his father died while copper mining near Lake Superior. He settled in Fremont, Nebraska, in 1866 and married Miss Carrie Van Anda (born 1849) on April 4, 1870, there.

== Career ==
Edward Blewett's commercial ventures included livestock trading, mining, banking and real estate.

In 1885, he was reported to have claimed that, "We have the largest horse ranch on this continent, if not in the world." He expected his company, Oregon Horse and Land, to "brand close on to 11,000 horses" that year.

He served as president of the First National Bank of Fremont (1888-1890).

With others, in Seattle, Blewett founded the Blewett Gold Mining Company, which acquired the Culver Company in 1892. The new company developed the mine and mill along Peshastin Creek in the Wenatchee Mountains and formed the now-abandoned mining town of Blewett, Washington, near what is now called Blewett Pass. Ownership conflicts of the successful mine were ultimately settled by the Washington State Supreme Court in 1913 in Hadley v. Washington Meteor Mining Company.

Edward and Carrie Blewett are also credited with helping to develop the Seattle community of Fremont, named after their hometown. On March 20, 1888, they purchased a parcel of newly cleared land at the northwest corner of Lake Union for $55,000. With the help of their agent, Luther H. Griffith (also from Fremont, Nebraska), the Blewetts' revised plat was recorded by King County on May 8, 1888.

Blewett was also president and a trustee of the Van Anda Copper & Gold Company. As of 1897, it was mining on 774 acres of crown-granted land on Texada Island, British Columbia. The associated mining town of Van Anda is still inhabited.

== Personal life ==
In 1904 the Blewetts moved to the Echo Park neighborhood of Los Angeles, California, living on West Kensington Road until their deaths: Carrie's in 1927 and Edward's in 1929.

== See also ==
- Old Blewett Pass Highway on Blogspot.
- Texada Island Heritage Society.
- Edward Blewett residence historic photo of 1217 Nye Ave, Fremont, NE.
