= Blewett Pass =

Mountain pass in the Wenatchee Mountains, Washington, U.S.

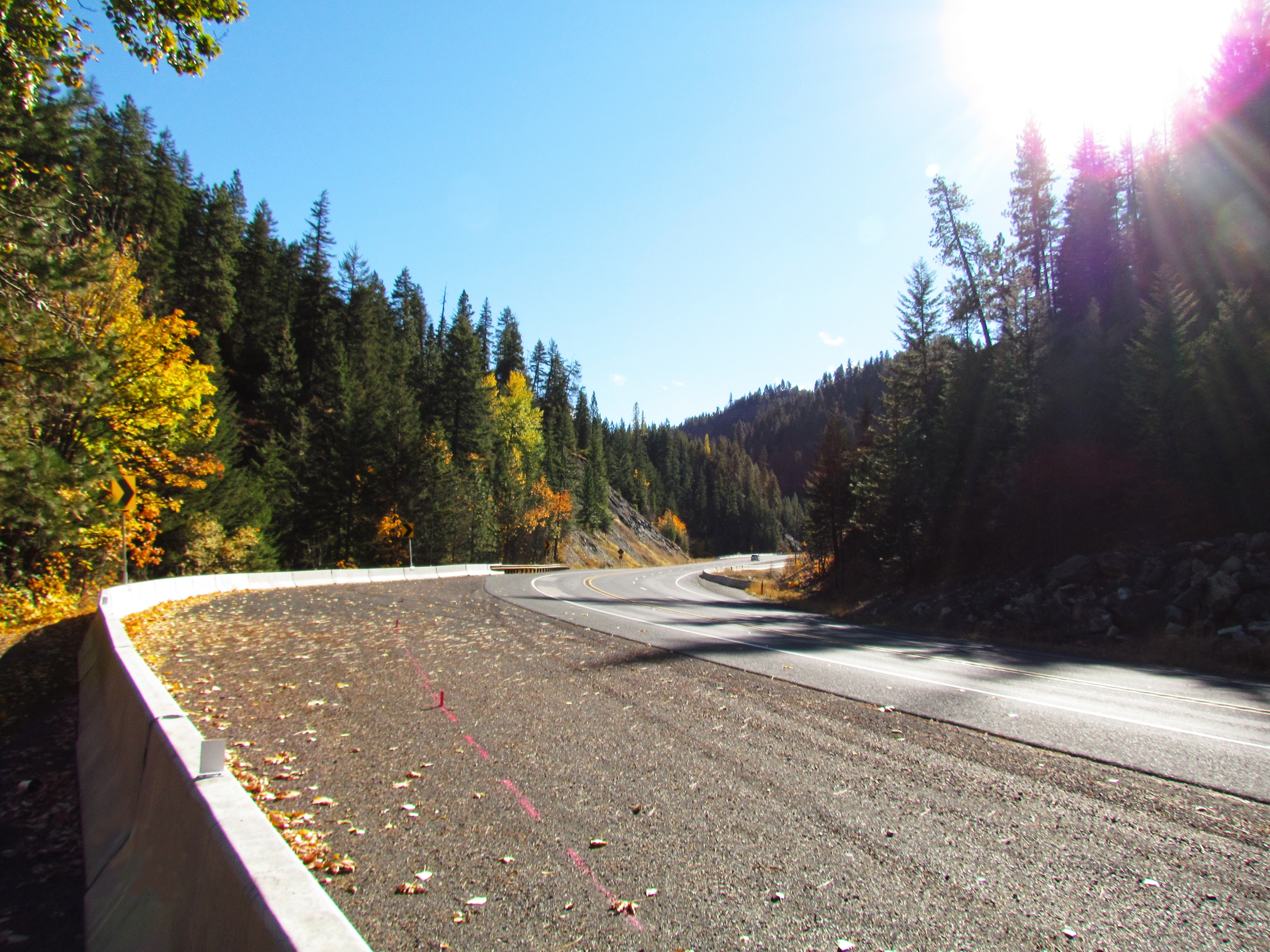
- Interactive map of Blewett Pass
- Elevation: 4,124 ft (1,257 m)
- Traversed by: US 97

Third Approach
- Location: Chelan / Kittitas Counties, Washington, United States
- Range: Wenatchee Mountains (Cascade Range)
- Coordinates: 47°20′07″N 120°34′44″W

Blewett Pass (/ˈbluːɛt/), at an elevation of 4,124 feet (1,257 m), is a mountain pass in the Wenatchee Mountains (an eastward extension of the Cascades) of Washington state that is crossed by U.S. Route 97 (US 97). Named for Edward Blewett, a Seattle mining promoter of the 1880s, it lies on the route of the historical Yellowstone Trail.

Unlike the many well known passes that lie on the spine of the Cascades, Blewett Pass lies on the divide between the Wenatchee River to the north and the Yakima River to the south. The highway over the pass connects Interstate 90 (I-90) between Seattle and Ellensburg, Washington with US 2 between Monroe and Wenatchee. The route from Seattle to Wenatchee over Snoqualmie Pass and Blewett Pass is a reasonable alternative to the more northerly route over Stevens Pass.

What is now called Blewett Pass was formerly known as Swauk Pass. It should not be confused with Old Blewett Pass, which is about 5 miles (8.0 km) west of the current summit at the slightly lower elevation of 4,064 feet (1,239 m). Swauk was renamed to Blewett Pass in the 1960s after the completion of a new highway alignment for US 97, with locals preferring to keep the old name. The old pass road is Forest Road 9715 and Forest Road 7320. The road closes for the winter so that seasonal recreation may take place. One should inquire about conditions with a Wenatchee National Forest office before driving the road upon re-opening in the warmer months.
