= Rick's Café Casablanca =

- Rick's Café in 2022.
- Interactive map of Rick's Café Casablanca

Restaurant information
- Established: March 2004
- Owner: The Usual Suspects S.A.
- Location: 248 Boulevard Sour Jdid, Place du Jardin Public, Casablanca, Casablanca, Morocco
- Coordinates: 33.60523°N 7.62037°W
- Reservations: +212 522 27 42 07
- Website: www.rickscafe.ma

Rick's Café Casablanca is a restaurant, bar and café located in the city of Casablanca, Morocco. Opened March 1, 2004, the place was designed to recreate in reality the set of the bar made famous by Humphrey Bogart and Ingrid Bergman in the movie classic Casablanca.

== History ==
Rick's Café Casablanca was developed by Kathy Kriger (1946–2018), a former American diplomat and commercial attaché in Morocco. Following the September 11, 2001 attacks, she decided to resign and embark on the project of recreating Rick's Café Américain, the fictional bar made famous in 1942 by Humphrey Bogart and Ingrid Bergman in the classic film Casablanca. She opened Rick's Café on March 1, 2004 in a former mansion with a central courtyard (riad), built in 1930 against the walls of the medina of Casablanca. It is owned by the company The Usual Suspects.

== Architecture and décor ==
The restaurant is housed in a traditional 1930 Moroccan grand mansion with a riad. Two palm trees flank its front door, and the land placement allows for three facades: a distinctive streetfront entrance with heavy wooden doors that depict that of the film; a port-oriented façade that looks to the Atlantic; and a narrow dead-end access which was the former main entrance but is now the service entrance.

Due to the age of the structure and proximity to the sea, the mansion was completely restored and renovated. American architect and interior designer Bill Willis conceived the decorative and architectural details reminiscent of the film: curved arches, a sculpted bar, balconies, balustrades as well as beaded and stencilled brass lighting and plants that cast luminous shadows on white walls. There is an authentic 1930s Pleyel piano and "As Time Goes By" is a common request to the in-house pianist.

== Music ==
Issam Chabaa plays piano nightly Tuesday through Sunday, a repertoire of standards reminiscent of the 1940s and 1950s, including classic French, Spanish and Brazilian songs along with American favorites such as "Summertime", "The Lady is a Tramp", "Blue Moon" and the inevitable "As Time Goes By" (several times a night). Sunday night is programmed for a jam session where musicians passing through town, and local amateurs join Issam for jazz improvisation. Between sets and at lunch a soundtrack of compiled standards and big band sounds provides background music.

== Analysis ==
According to Jean-François Staszak, this restaurant "fits the definition that Jean Baudrillard gives of a simulacrum: the copy of a place that never existed".
