= Charles Blewitt (cricketer) =

English cricketer

Cricket information
- Batting: Right-handed

Career statistics
Competition	First-class
Matches	1
Runs scored	7
Batting average	3.50
100s/50s	0/0
Top score	4
Catches/stumpings	0/–
- Source: CricInfo, 14 April 2023

Charles Percy Blewitt (15 October 1877 – 15 December 1937) was an English cricketer who played a single first-class match, for Worcestershire against Kent in late June 1912. His one appearance at this level was not a success, as he made only 4 and 3.

He was born at Kates Hill, Worcestershire, and died in Danesford, Shropshire at the age of 60.
