= Bluet =

Bluet or bluets may refer to:

- Centaurea, a plant genus in the family Asteraceae
  - Centaurea cyanus, one of its many common names
  - Centaurea montana, particularly as mountain bluet though also without the distinction
- Several plant genera in the family Rubiaceae, notably:
  - Houstonia
  - Oldenlandiopsis or "creeping bluet"
- Some damselfly genera in the family Coenagrionidae:
  - Enallagma
  - Coenagrion
- Bluets (poetry collection), a collection of poetry by Maggie Nelson

== See also ==
- Blewitt (disambiguation)
