= Sipaneeae =

Scientific classification
- Kingdom: Plantae
- Clade: Tracheophytes
- Clade: Angiosperms
- Clade: Eudicots
- Clade: Asterids
- Order: Gentianales
- Family: Rubiaceae
- Subfamily: Ixoroideae
- Tribe: Sipaneeae; Bremek.

Type genus
- Sipanea Aubl.

Tribe of plants

Sipaneeae is a tribe of flowering plants in the family Rubiaceae and contains about 43 species in 10 genera. Its representatives are found from Central to Southern Tropical America.

== Genera ==
Currently accepted names

- Chalepophyllum Hook.f. (1 sp) - Guyana, Venezuela
- Dendrosipanea Ducke (2 sp) - Southern Venezuela, Northern Brazil
- Limnosipanea Hook.f. (3 sp) - Panama to Southern Tropical America
- Maguireothamnus Steyerm. (2 sp) - Guyana, Venezuela (+ Northern Brazil?)
- Neblinathamnus Steyerm. (2 sp) - Venezuela, Northern Brazil
- Neobertiera Wernham (4 sp) - French Guiana, Guyana
- Pteridocalyx Wernham (2 sp) - Guyana
- Sipanea Aubl. (19 sp) - Trinidad to Central & Southern Tropical America
- Sipaneopsis Steyerm. (7 sp) - Colombia, Southern Venezuela, Northern Brazil
- Steyermarkia Standl. (1 sp) - South-Eastern Mexico, Guatemala

Synonyms

- Ptychodea Willd. ex Cham. & Schltdl. = Sipanea
- Sipania Seem. = Limnosipanea
- Virecta L.f. = Sipanea
