= Needle flower =

Needle flower or Needle-flower may refer to various plants, including:

- Posoqueria latifolia, needle flower tree
- Posoqueria longiflora, needle flower tree
- Daylily and Hemerocallis fulva, known as Golden Needle Flowers in Asian cuisine
- Jasminum auriculatum, needle-flower jasmine
- Psydrax subcordata, needle flower tree
- Justicia longii, white needle-flower
