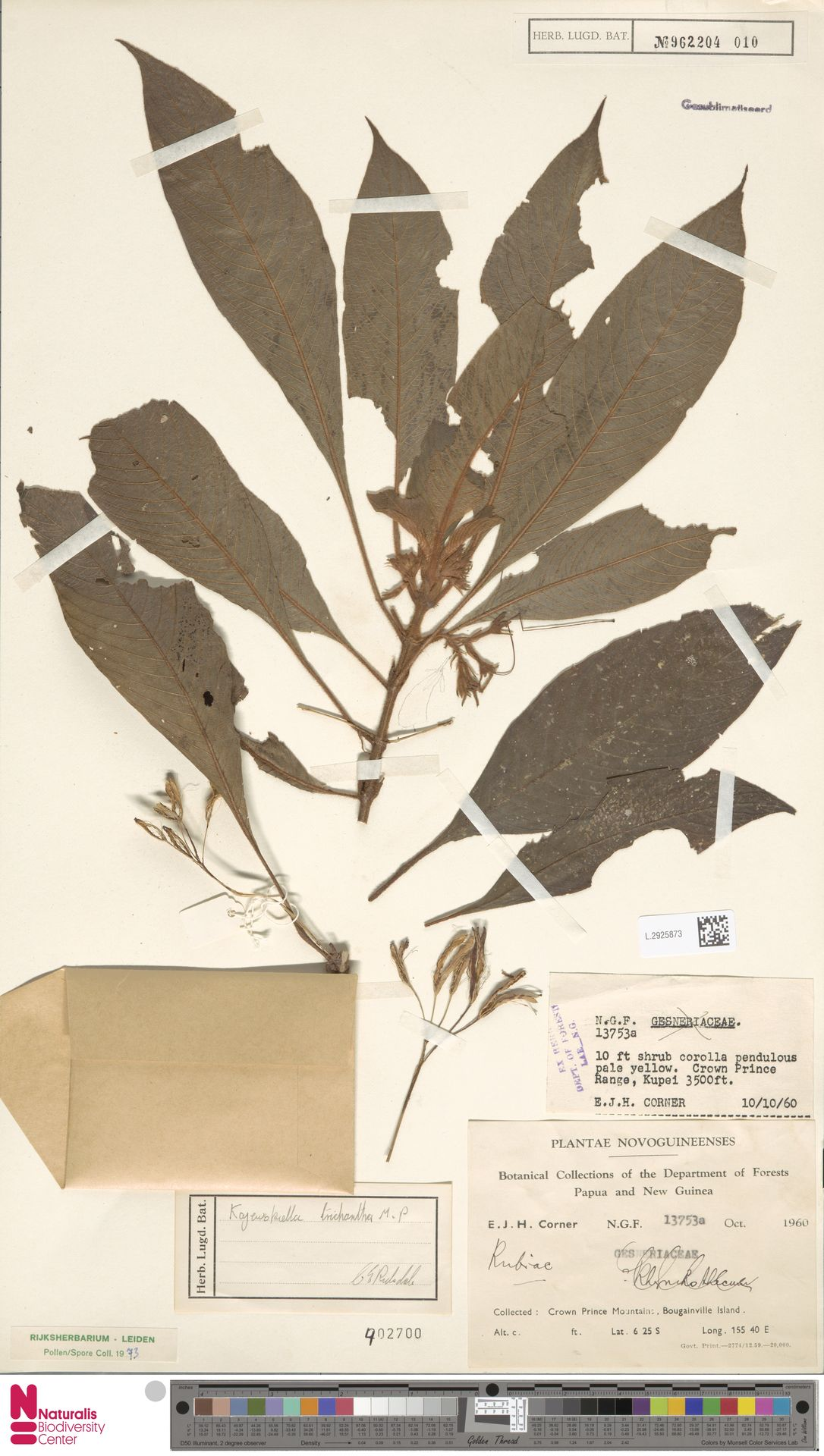

Scientific classification
- Kingdom: Plantae
- Clade: Tracheophytes
- Clade: Angiosperms
- Clade: Eudicots
- Clade: Asterids
- Order: Gentianales
- Family: Rubiaceae
- Genus: Kajewskiella; Merr. & L.M.Perry

Type species
- Kajewskiella trichantha Merr. & L.M.Perry

= Kajewskiella =

Genus of plants

Kajewskiella is a genus of plants in the family Rubiaceae, endemic to the Solomon Islands.

== Taxonomy ==
The genus Kajewskiella was established by Elmer Drew Merrill and Lily May Perry in 1947. Its position within the Rubiaceae is somewhat uncertain. The original describers were unable to suggest a definite placement. It has been placed in the tribe Dialypetalantheae (=Condamineeae), and also considered to be related to the genus Xanthophytum, which is placed in the tribe Ophiorrhizeae. The relationship with Xanthophytum is supported by morphological data but molecular data was not available in a 2019 study.

=== Species ===
As of March 2023, Plants of the World Online accepted two species, both endemic to the Solomon Islands:

- Kajewskiella polyantha M.E.Jansen
- Kajewskiella trichantha Merr. & L.M.Perry
