= Chalepophyllum =

Scientific classification
- Kingdom: Plantae
- Clade: Tracheophytes
- Clade: Angiosperms
- Clade: Eudicots
- Clade: Asterids
- Order: Gentianales
- Family: Rubiaceae
- Subfamily: Ixoroideae
- Tribe: Sipaneeae
- Genus: Chalepophyllum; Hook.f.
- Species: C. guyanense

Binomial name
- Chalepophyllum guyanense Hook.f.

Synonyms
- Chalepophyllum guyanense var. cuneatum Steyerm.; Chalepophyllum longilobum Steyerm.

Genus of plants

Chalepophyllum is a monotypic genus of flowering plants in the family Rubiaceae. The single species, Chalepophyllum guyanense, occurs in Guyana and southern Venezuela.

This species is a low, branching shrub with somewhat rounded, leathery leaves. The inflorescence is made up of one to five flowers located in the leaf axils. The flowers are variable in shape and size but are generally funnel-shaped and white in color. The fruit is a woody capsule.

This plant grows in wet scrub and cloud forests.
