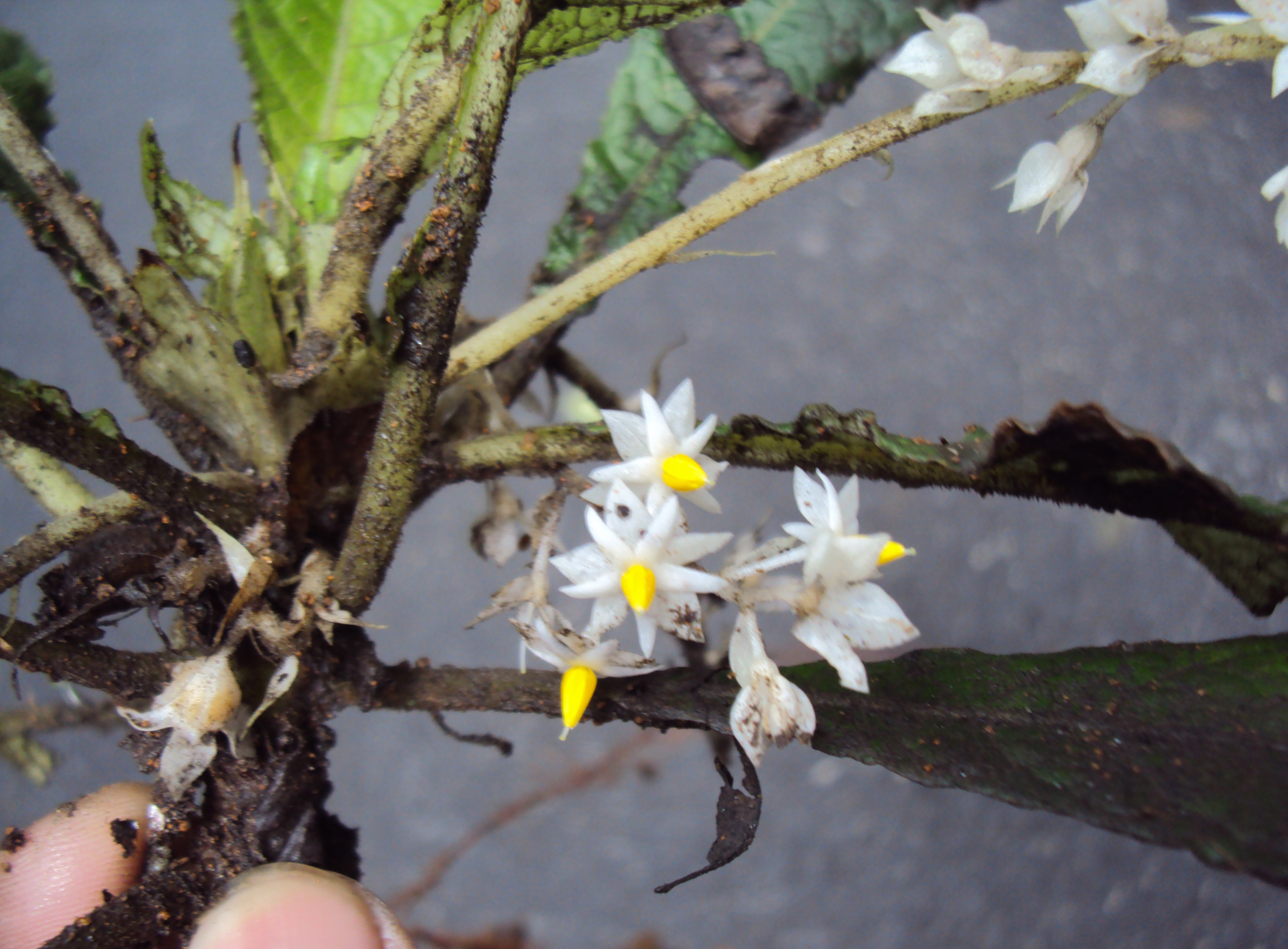
- Plant and flowers

Scientific classification
- Kingdom: Plantae
- Clade: Tracheophytes
- Clade: Angiosperms
- Clade: Eudicots
- Clade: Asterids
- Order: Gentianales
- Family: Rubiaceae
- Genus: Neurocalyx
- Species: N. calycinus

Binomial name
- Neurocalyx calycinus (R.Br. ex Benn.) Rob.

Synonyms
- Argostemma calycinum R.Br. ex Benn.; Neurocalyx capitata Benth. ex Hook.f.; Neurocalyx hookerianus Wight; Neurocalyx wightii Arn.

= Neurocalyx calycinus =

Species of shrub

Neurocalyx calycinus is a shrub native to India and Sri Lanka. It is found in evergreen forests and wet, tropical habitats.

== Description ==
It is a large herb, with leaves growing to 26 by 7 centimetres (10.2 in × 2.8 in). Its racemes are 10–13 centimetres (3.9–5.1 in) long, with white flowers. It has different classifications.

It is a wild ornamental plant classified under the tribe Ophiorrhizeae. It can grow up to 20 inches (51 cm) and is dispersed on rocky crevices near streams in tropical wet evergreen forests at altitudes higher than 1,200–1,600 metres (3,900–5,200 ft).
