= Dendrosipanea =

Scientific classification
- Kingdom: Plantae
- Clade: Tracheophytes
- Clade: Angiosperms
- Clade: Eudicots
- Clade: Asterids
- Order: Gentianales
- Family: Rubiaceae
- Subfamily: Ixoroideae
- Tribe: Sipaneeae
- Genus: Dendrosipanea; Ducke

Type species
- Dendrosipanea spigelioides Ducke

Genus of plants

Dendrosipanea is a genus of flowering plants in the family Rubiaceae. The genus is found in Brazil and Venezuela.

== Species ==
- Dendrosipanea revoluta Steyerm. - Amazonas, Venezuela
- Dendrosipanea spigelioides Ducke - southern Venezuela, northern Brazil
