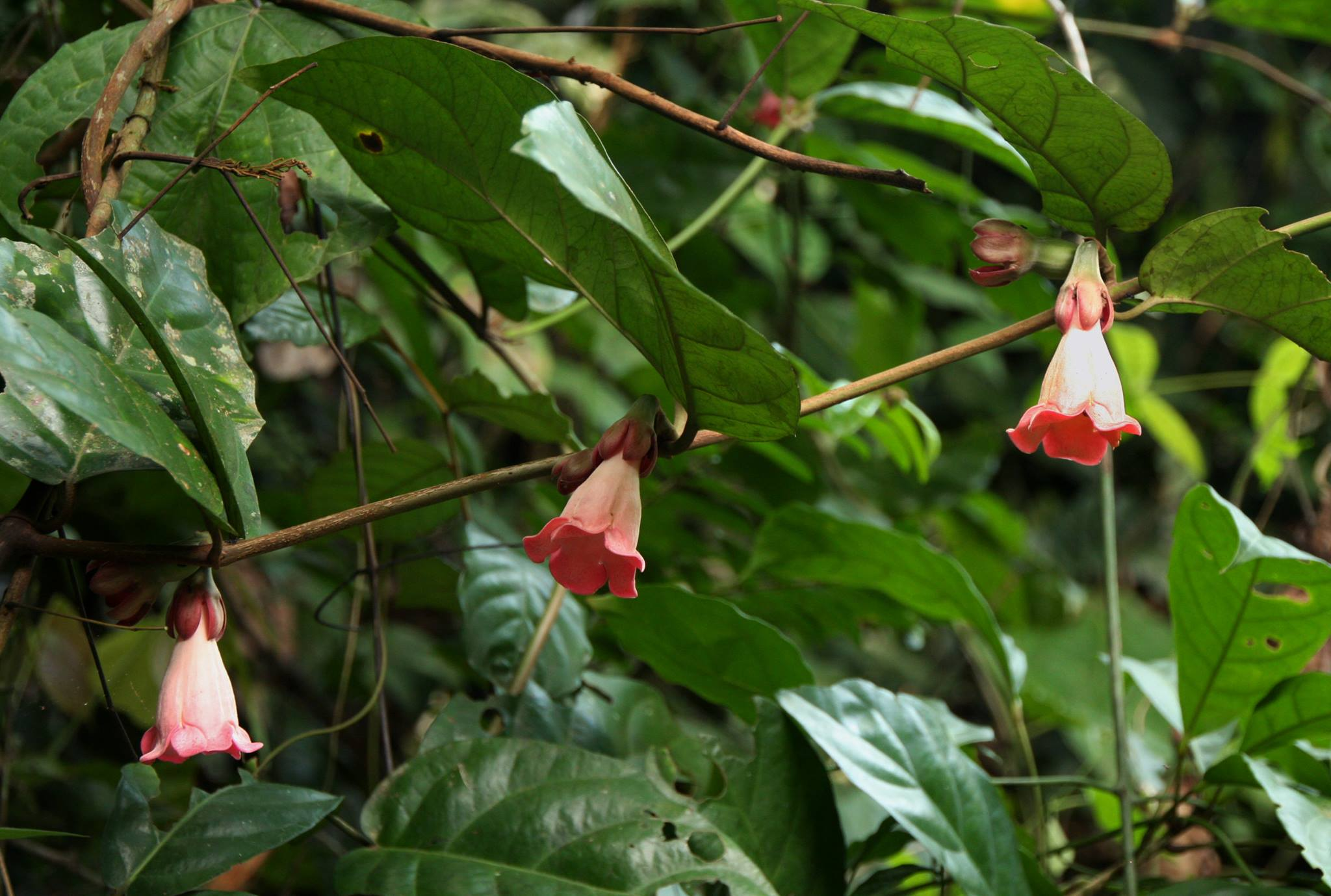

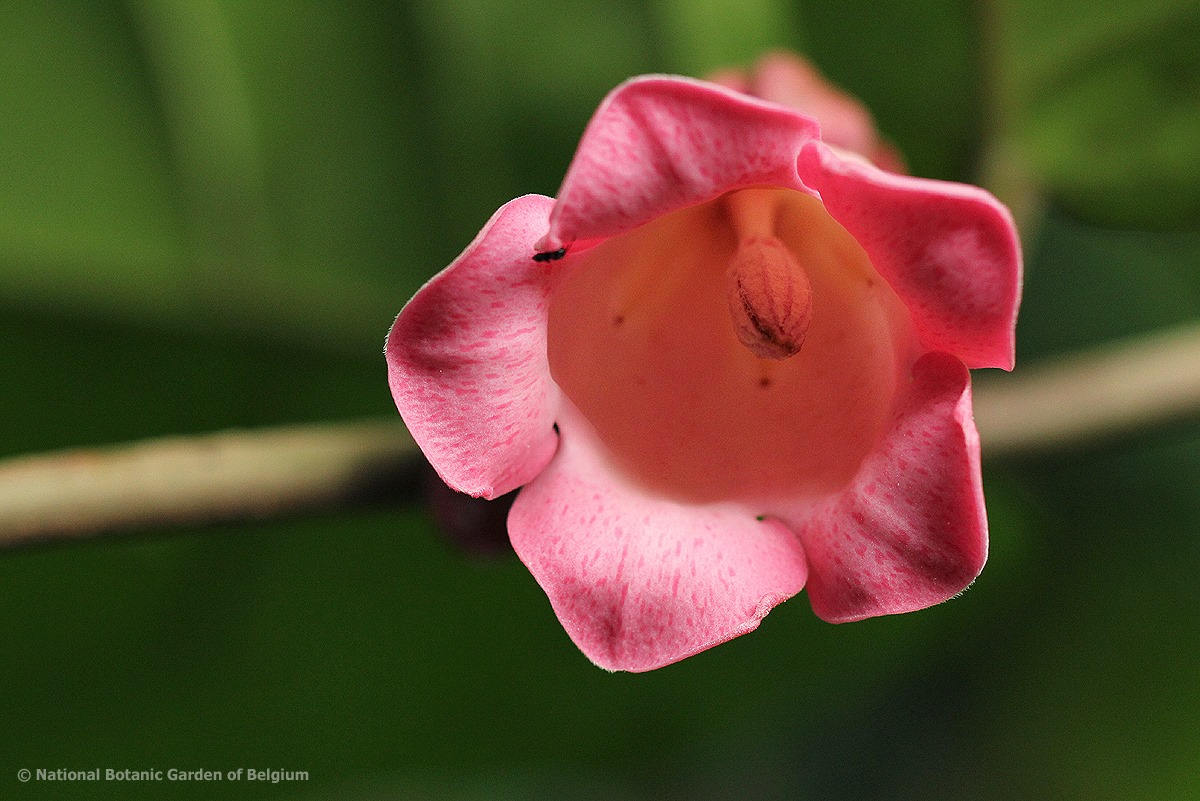

Scientific classification
- Kingdom: Plantae
- Clade: Tracheophytes
- Clade: Angiosperms
- Clade: Eudicots
- Clade: Asterids
- Order: Gentianales
- Family: Rubiaceae
- Genus: Sherbournia
- Species: S. bignoniiflora

Binomial name
- Sherbournia bignoniiflora (Welw.) Hua

Synonyms
- Amaralia bignoniiflora (Welw.) Hiern; Amaralia brazzaei (Hua) Wernham; Amaralia buntingii Wernham; Amaralia ekotokicola Wernham; Amaralia heinsioides Wernham; Amaralia palustris Wernham; Gardenia bignoniiflora Welw.; Sherbournia bignoniiflora var. brazzaei (Hua) N.Hallé; Sherbournia brazzaei Hua

= Sherbournia bignoniiflora =

Species of plant

Sherbournia bignoniiflora is an African scandent shrub or liane with large, showy, bell-shaped flowers belonging to the family Rubiaceae and found in equatorial West African evergreen forests in Cameroun, Benin, Gabon, Sudan, Uganda, Democratic Republic of the Congo, Nigeria, Sierra Leone, Ivory Coast, Zambia and Angola. It is one of some 14 species in the genus Sherbournia.

== Uses ==
Besides its ornamental value the species' leaves and bark are used in decoctions and infusions for a variety of ailments and conditions - the seed-coat mucilage as a pain-killer, the bark and leaves against pulmonary problems, stomach ailments, roots to combat cutaneous and subcutaneous parasitic infections, and the bark for aphrodisiacs and febrifuges. The stems produce tough fibres used as general purpose binding material.
