= Aleisanthia =

Scientific classification
- Kingdom: Plantae
- Clade: Tracheophytes
- Clade: Angiosperms
- Clade: Eudicots
- Clade: Asterids
- Order: Gentianales
- Family: Rubiaceae
- Subfamily: Ixoroideae
- Tribe: Aleisanthieae
- Genus: Aleisanthia; Ridl.

Genus of plants

Aleisanthia is a genus of flowering plants in the family Rubiaceae. It holds only two species, both of which are endemic to Peninsular Malaysia.

== Species ==
- Aleisanthia rupestris (Ridl.) Ridl. - Selangor
- Aleisanthia sylvatica Ridl. - Kelantan
