= Reinier Cornelis Bakhuizen van den Brink =

Reinier Cornelis Bakhuizen van den Brink may refer to:

- Reinier Cornelis Bakhuizen van den Brink (born 1881) (1881–1945), Dutch biologist
- Reinier Cornelis Bakhuizen van den Brink (born 1911) (1911–1987), Dutch biologist, and son of the above
- Reinier Cornelis Bakhuizen van den Brink (born 1810) (1810–1865), Dutch literary critic, historian and philosopher
