= Aleisanthiopsis =

Scientific classification
- Kingdom: Plantae
- Clade: Tracheophytes
- Clade: Angiosperms
- Clade: Eudicots
- Clade: Asterids
- Order: Gentianales
- Family: Rubiaceae
- Subfamily: Ixoroideae
- Tribe: Aleisanthieae
- Genus: Aleisanthiopsis; Tange

Genus of plants

Aleisanthiopsis is a genus of flowering plants in the family Rubiaceae. It consists of only two species, both of which are endemic to the Kalimantan region of Indonesian Borneo.

== Species ==
- Aleisanthiopsis distantiflora (Merr.) Tange - Kalimantan
- Aleisanthiopsis multiflora Tange - Kalimantan
