= Gleasonia =

Scientific classification
- Kingdom: Plantae
- Clade: Tracheophytes
- Clade: Angiosperms
- Clade: Eudicots
- Clade: Asterids
- Order: Gentianales
- Family: Rubiaceae
- Subfamily: Ixoroideae
- Tribe: Henriquezieae
- Genus: Gleasonia; Standl.

Type species
- Gleasonia duidana Standl.

Genus of plants

Gleasonia is a genus of plants in the Rubiaceae. There are at the present time (May 2014) five accepted species, all native to South America.

- Gleasonia cururuensis Egler - Brazil
- Gleasonia duidana Standl. - Brazil, Venezuela, Guyana
  - Gleasonia duidana var. duidana - Brazil, Venezuela
  - Gleasonia duidana var. latifolia Steyerm. - Brazil, Venezuela, Guyana
- Gleasonia macrocalyx Ducke - Brazil
- Gleasonia prancei B.M.Boom - Brazil
- Gleasonia uaupensis Ducke - Brazil
