= Steenisia =

Scientific classification
- Kingdom: Plantae
- Clade: Embryophytes
- Clade: Tracheophytes
- Clade: Spermatophytes
- Clade: Angiosperms
- Clade: Eudicots
- Clade: Asterids
- Order: Gentianales
- Family: Rubiaceae
- Subfamily: Ixoroideae
- Tribe: Steenisieae
- Genus: Steenisia; Bakh.f.

Genus of plants

Steenisia is a genus of flowering plants in the family Rubiaceae. The genus is endemic to the island of Borneo.

== Species ==
- Steenisia borneensis (Valeton) Bakh.f.
- Steenisia corollina (Valeton) Bakh.f.
- Steenisia elata (Valeton) Bakh.f.
- Steenisia pleurocarpa (Airy Shaw) Bakh.f.
- Steenisia pterosepala (Airy Shaw) Bakh.f.
