= Henriquezia =

Scientific classification
- Kingdom: Plantae
- Clade: Tracheophytes
- Clade: Angiosperms
- Clade: Eudicots
- Clade: Asterids
- Order: Gentianales
- Family: Rubiaceae
- Subfamily: Ixoroideae
- Tribe: Henriquezieae
- Genus: Henriquezia; Spruce ex Benth.

Species
- See text.

Genus of plants

Henriquezia is a genus of three species of shrubs or trees in the family Rubiaceae, native to the Amazon basin. It was named by Richard Spruce after Henrique Antony, an italian-born man who hosted foreign explorers in the Amazon basin during the XIXth century.

Species

- Henriquezia jenmanii
- Henriquezia nitida
- Henriquezia verticillata
