= Lerchea =

Scientific classification
- Kingdom: Plantae
- Clade: Embryophytes
- Clade: Tracheophytes
- Clade: Angiosperms
- Clade: Eudicots
- Clade: Asterids
- Order: Gentianales
- Family: Rubiaceae
- Subfamily: Rubioideae
- Tribe: Ophiorrhizeae
- Genus: Lerchea; L.

Synonyms
- Codaria Kuntze; Notodontia Pierre ex Pit.; Polycycliska Ridl.

Genus of flowering plants

Lerchea is a genus of flowering plants in the family Rubiaceae. It was described by Carl Linnaeus in 1771. The genus is found from southern China to western Malesia.

== Species ==
- Lerchea beccariana (Bakh.f.) B.Axelius
- Lerchea bracteata Valeton
- Lerchea capitata S.Moore
- Lerchea corymbosa Axelius
- Lerchea interrupta Korth.
- Lerchea longicauda L.
- Lerchea micrantha (Drake) H.S.Lo
- Lerchea paniculata Backer ex Bakh.f.
- Lerchea parviflora Axelius
- Lerchea sinica (H.S.Lo) H.S.Lo
