= Atractogyne =

Scientific classification
- Kingdom: Plantae
- Clade: Embryophytes
- Clade: Tracheophytes
- Clade: Spermatophytes
- Clade: Angiosperms
- Clade: Eudicots
- Clade: Asterids
- Order: Gentianales
- Family: Rubiaceae
- Subfamily: Ixoroideae
- Tribe: Sherbournieae
- Genus: Atractogyne; Pierre

Type species
- Atractogyne gabonii Pierre

Synonyms
- Afrohamelia Wernham

Genus of plants

Atractogyne is a genus of flowering plants in the family Rubiaceae. It is found in western and western-central tropical Africa.

== Species ==
Two species are currently recognised:

- Atractogyne bracteata (Wernham) Hutch. & Dalziel - Ghana, Côte d'Ivoire, Nigeria, Central African Republic, Cameroon, Gabon
- Atractogyne gabonii Pierre - Central African Republic, Cameroon, Gabon, Congo-Brazzaville, Congo-Kinshasa (Zaire)
