= Steyermarkia =

Scientific classification
- Kingdom: Plantae
- Clade: Tracheophytes
- Clade: Angiosperms
- Clade: Eudicots
- Clade: Asterids
- Order: Gentianales
- Family: Rubiaceae
- Subfamily: Ixoroideae
- Tribe: Sipaneeae
- Genus: Steyermarkia; Standl.

Species of flowering plant

Steyermarkia is a monotypic genus of flowering plants belonging to the family Rubiaceae. It only contains one known species, Steyermarkia guatemalensis Standl.

It is native to south-eastern Mexico and Guatemala.

The genus name of Steyermarkia is in honour of Julian Alfred Steyermark (1909–1988), an American botanist. The Latin specific epithet of guatemalensis means coming from Guatemala, where the plant was found. Both the genus and the species were first described and published in Publ. Field Mus. Nat. Hist., Bot. Ser. Vol.22 on page 216 in 1940.
