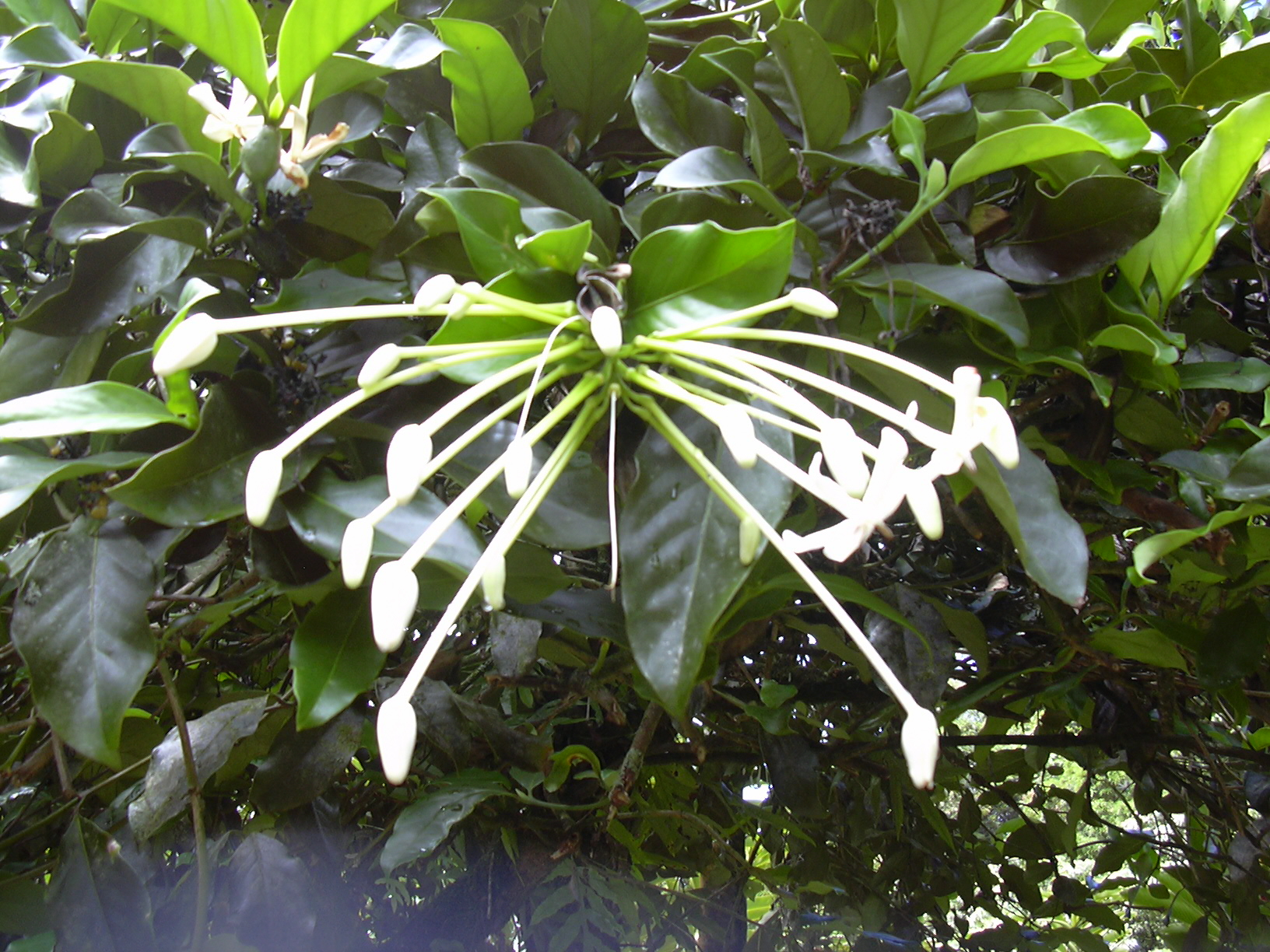
- Posoqueria latifolia

Scientific classification
- Kingdom: Plantae
- Clade: Tracheophytes
- Clade: Angiosperms
- Clade: Eudicots
- Clade: Asterids
- Order: Gentianales
- Family: Rubiaceae
- Subfamily: Ixoroideae
- Tribe: Posoquerieae; Delprete

= Posoquerieae =

Tribe of plants

Posoquerieae is a tribe of flowering plants in the family Rubiaceae and contains 23 species in 2 genera. Its representatives are found from Mexico to tropical South America.

== Genera ==
Currently accepted names

- Molopanthera Turcz. (1 sp)
- Posoqueria Aubl. (22 sp)

Synonyms

- Cyrtanthus Schreb. = Posoqueria
- Kyrtanthus J.F.Gmel. = Posoqueria
- Martha F.J.Müll. = Posoqueria
- Posoria Raf. = Posoqueria
- Ramspekia Scop. = Posoqueria
- Solena Lour. = Posoqueria
- Stannia H.Karst. = Posoqueria
- Willdenovia J.F.Gmel. = Posoqueria
