= Henriquezieae =

Scientific classification
- Kingdom: Plantae
- Clade: Tracheophytes
- Clade: Angiosperms
- Clade: Eudicots
- Clade: Asterids
- Order: Gentianales
- Family: Rubiaceae
- Subfamily: Ixoroideae
- Tribe: Henriquezieae; Benth. & Hook.f.

Type genus
- Henriquezia Spruce ex Benth.

Tribe of angiosperms

Henriquezieae is a tribe of flowering plants in the family Rubiaceae and contains 20 species in 3 genera. Its representatives are found in northern South America.

== Genera ==
Currently accepted names

- Gleasonia Standl. (5 sp)
- Henriquezia Spruce ex Benth. (3 sp)
- Platycarpum Bonpl. (12 sp)
