= Boholia =

Scientific classification
- Kingdom: Plantae
- Clade: Tracheophytes
- Clade: Angiosperms
- Clade: Eudicots
- Clade: Asterids
- Order: Gentianales
- Family: Rubiaceae
- Subfamily: Ixoroideae
- Tribe: Airospermeae
- Genus: Boholia; Merr.
- Species: B. nematostylis

Binomial name
- Boholia nematostylis Merr.

Species of plant

Boholia is a monotypic genus of flowering plants in the family Rubiaceae. It was described by Elmer Drew Merrill in 1926. The genus contains only one species, viz. Boholia nematostylis, which is native to Sumatra and the Lesser Sunda Islands of Indonesia and the Philippines.
