= Airospermeae =

Scientific classification
- Kingdom: Plantae
- Clade: Tracheophytes
- Clade: Angiosperms
- Clade: Eudicots
- Clade: Asterids
- Order: Gentianales
- Family: Rubiaceae
- Subfamily: Ixoroideae
- Tribe: Airospermeae; Kainul. & B.Bremer

Type genus
- Airosperma K.Schum. & Lauterb.

Tribe of plants

Airospermeae is a tribe of flowering plants in the family Rubiaceae and contains 7 species in 2 genera. Its representatives are found in New Guinea, Fiji, the Lesser Sunda Islands, the Philippines, and Sumatra.

== Genera ==
Currently accepted names

- Airosperma K.Schum. & Lauterb. - New Guinea, Fiji
- Boholia Merr. - the Lesser Sunda Islands, the Philippines, Sumatra

Synonyms

- Abramsia Gillespie = Airosperma
