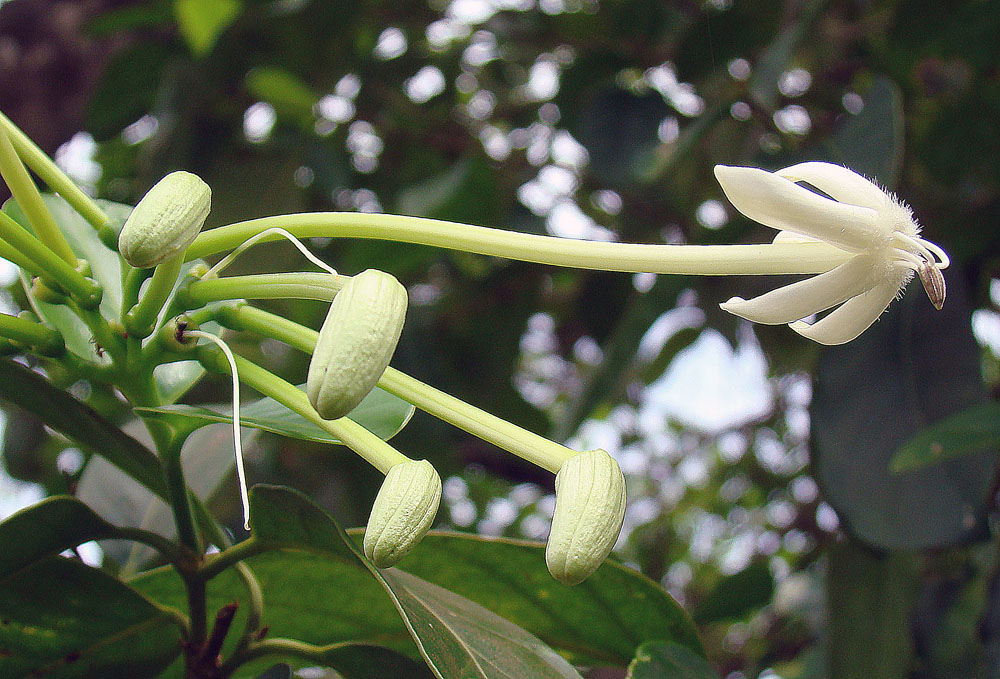
- Posoqueria latifolia

Scientific classification
- Kingdom: Plantae
- Clade: Tracheophytes
- Clade: Angiosperms
- Clade: Eudicots
- Clade: Asterids
- Order: Gentianales
- Family: Rubiaceae
- Subfamily: Ixoroideae
- Tribe: Posoquerieae
- Genus: Posoqueria; Aubl.

Type species
- Posoqueria longiflora Aubl.

Synonyms
- Cyrtanthus Schreb.; Kyrtanthus J.F.Gmel.; Martha F.J.Müll.; Posoria Raf.; Ramspekia Scop.; Solena Lour.; Stannia H.Karst.; Willdenovia J.F.Gmel.

= Posoqueria =

Genus of plants

Posoqueria is a genus of flowering plants in the family Rubiaceae. The genus is found Mexico to tropical America.

== Cytology ==
The chromosome count of Posoqueria latifolia is 2n = 32, 34, or 36.

== Taxonomy ==
It was described by Jean Baptiste Christophore Fusée Aublet in 1775 with Posoqueria longiflora Aubl. as the type species.

=== Species ===
- Posoqueria acutifolia Mart.
- Posoqueria bahiensis Macias & L.S.Kinosh.
- Posoqueria calantha Barb.Rodr.
- Posoqueria chocoana C.M.Taylor
- Posoqueria coriacea M.Martens & Galeotti
- Posoqueria correana C.M.Taylor
- Posoqueria costaricensis C.M.Taylor
- Posoqueria fragrantissima Linden & André
- Posoqueria grandiflora Standl.
- Posoqueria grandifructa Hammel & C.M.Taylor
- Posoqueria laevis C.M.Taylor
- Posoqueria latifolia (Rudge) Schult.
- Posoqueria laurifolia Mart.
- Posoqueria longifilamentosa C.M.Taylor
- Posoqueria longiflora Aubl.
- Posoqueria palustris Mart.
- Posoqueria platysiphonia Rusby
- Posoqueria robusta Hammel & C.M.Taylor
- Posoqueria tarairensis C.M.Taylor
- Posoqueria trinitatis DC.
- Posoqueria velutina Standl.
- Posoqueria williamsii Steyerm.

== Image gallery ==
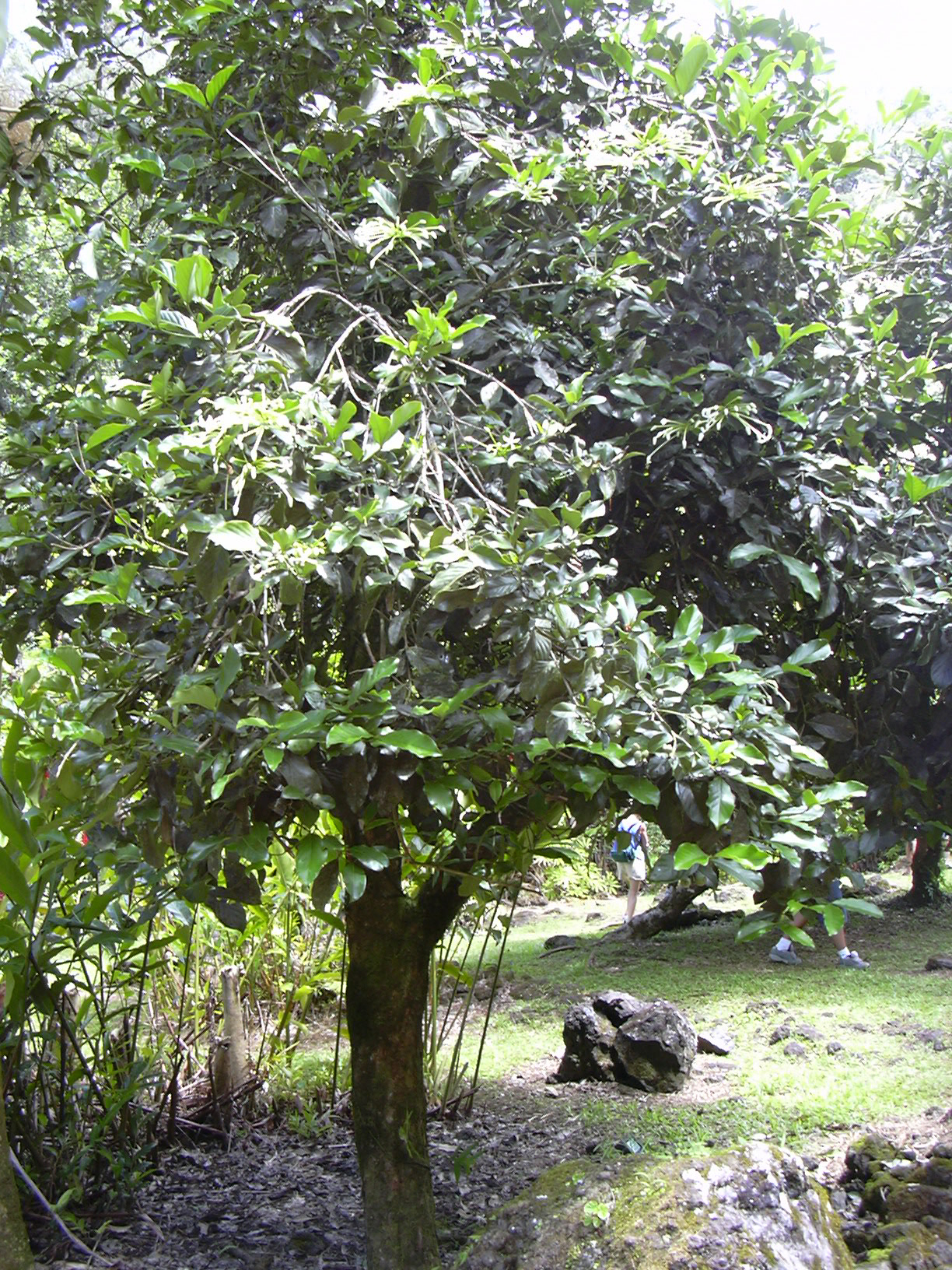
Posoqueria latifolia tree

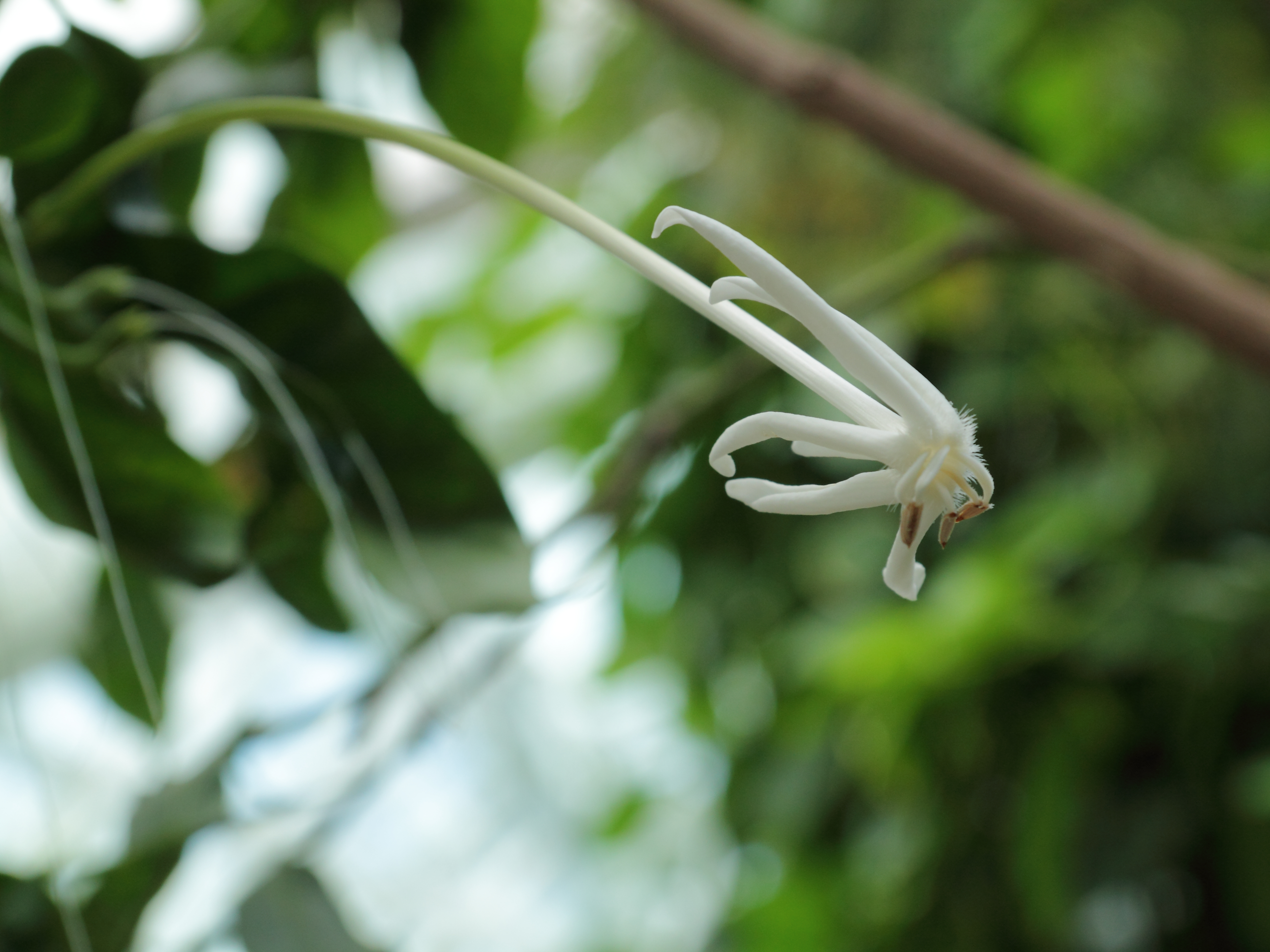
Posoqueria longiflora flower

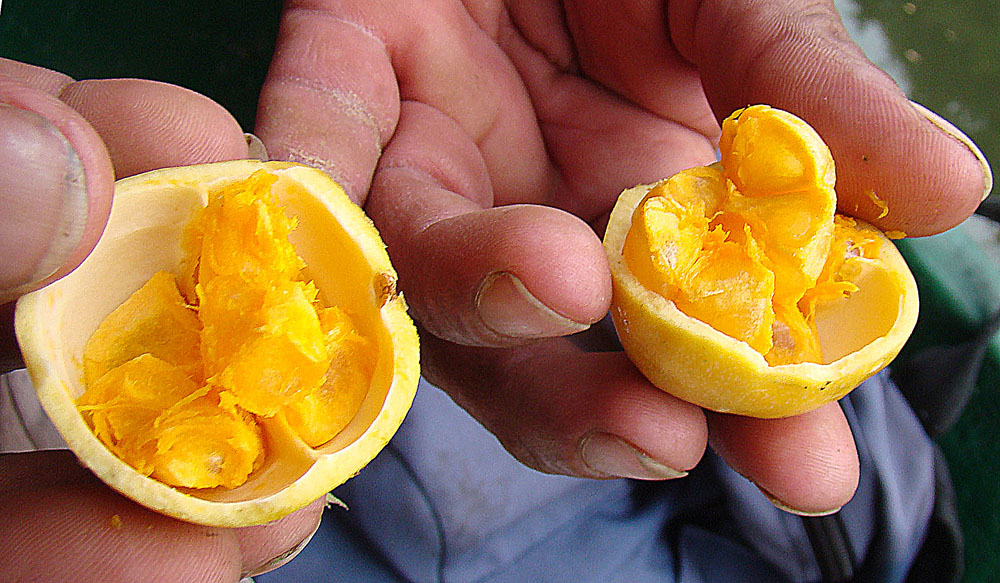
"Monkey apple" from Posoqueria latifolia
