= Greeniopsis =

Scientific classification
- Kingdom: Plantae
- Clade: Tracheophytes
- Clade: Angiosperms
- Clade: Eudicots
- Clade: Asterids
- Order: Gentianales
- Family: Rubiaceae
- Subfamily: Ixoroideae
- Tribe: Aleisanthieae
- Genus: Greeniopsis; Merr.

Genus of plants

Greeniopsis is a genus of flowering plants in the family Rubiaceae. The genus is endemic to the Philippines.

== Species ==
- Greeniopsis discolor Merr.
- Greeniopsis euphlebia Merr.
- Greeniopsis megalantha Merr.
- Greeniopsis multiflora (Elmer) Merr.
- Greeniopsis pubescens Merr.
- Greeniopsis sibuyanensis Elmer
