= Coptophyllum =

Scientific classification
- Kingdom: Plantae
- Clade: Tracheophytes
- Clade: Angiosperms
- Clade: Eudicots
- Clade: Asterids
- Order: Gentianales
- Family: Rubiaceae
- Genus: Coptophyllum; Korth.

Type species
- Coptophyllum bracteatum Korth.

Synonyms
- Jainia N.P.Balakr.; Pomazota Ridl.

Genus of plants

Coptophyllum is a genus of flowering plants in the family Rubiaceae. The genus is found from the Nicobar Islands to western Malesia.

== Species ==
- Coptophyllum bracteatum Korth.
- Coptophyllum capitatum Miq.
- Coptophyllum fulvum (Zoll. & Moritzi) Bakh.f.
- Coptophyllum nicobaricum (N.P.Balakr) Deb & Rout
- Coptophyllum reptans (Backer ex Bremek.) Bakh.f.
- Coptophyllum simalurense (Bremek.) A.P.Davis
- Coptophyllum sylvestre (Ridl.) I.M.Turner
- Coptophyllum vanleeuwenii (Bremek.) A.P.Davis
