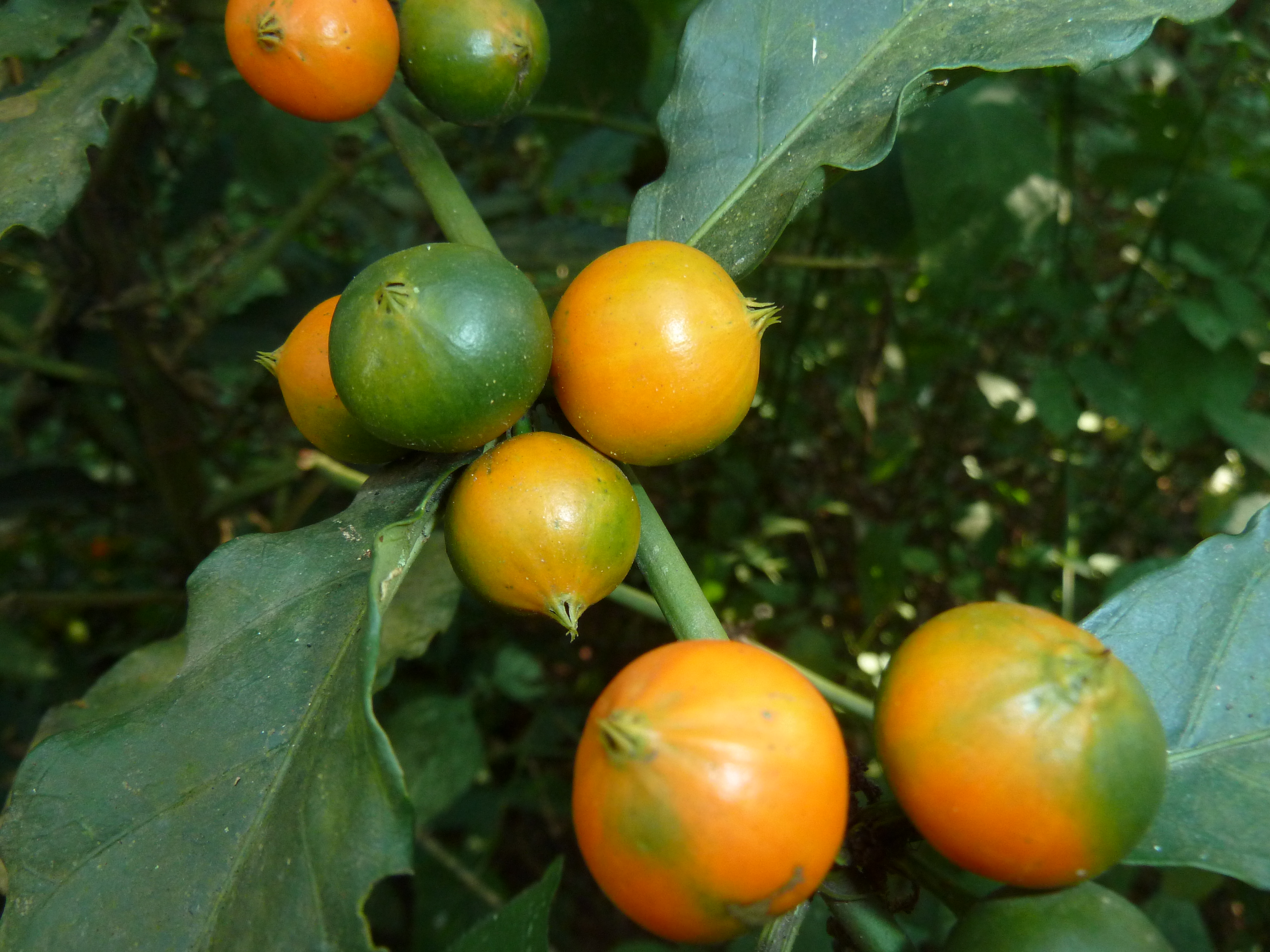
- Mitriostigma axillare

Scientific classification
- Kingdom: Plantae
- Clade: Tracheophytes
- Clade: Angiosperms
- Clade: Eudicots
- Clade: Asterids
- Order: Gentianales
- Family: Rubiaceae
- Tribe: Sherbournieae
- Genus: Mitriostigma; Hochst.

= Mitriostigma =

Genus of plants

Mitriostigma is a genus of flowering plants in the family Rubiaceae. There are five species all native to Southern Africa.

Species:

- Mitriostigma axillare Hochst.
- Mitriostigma barteri Hook.f. ex Hiern
- Mitriostigma greenwayi Bridson
- Mitriostigma monocaule Sonké & Dessein
- Mitriostigma usambarense Verdc.
