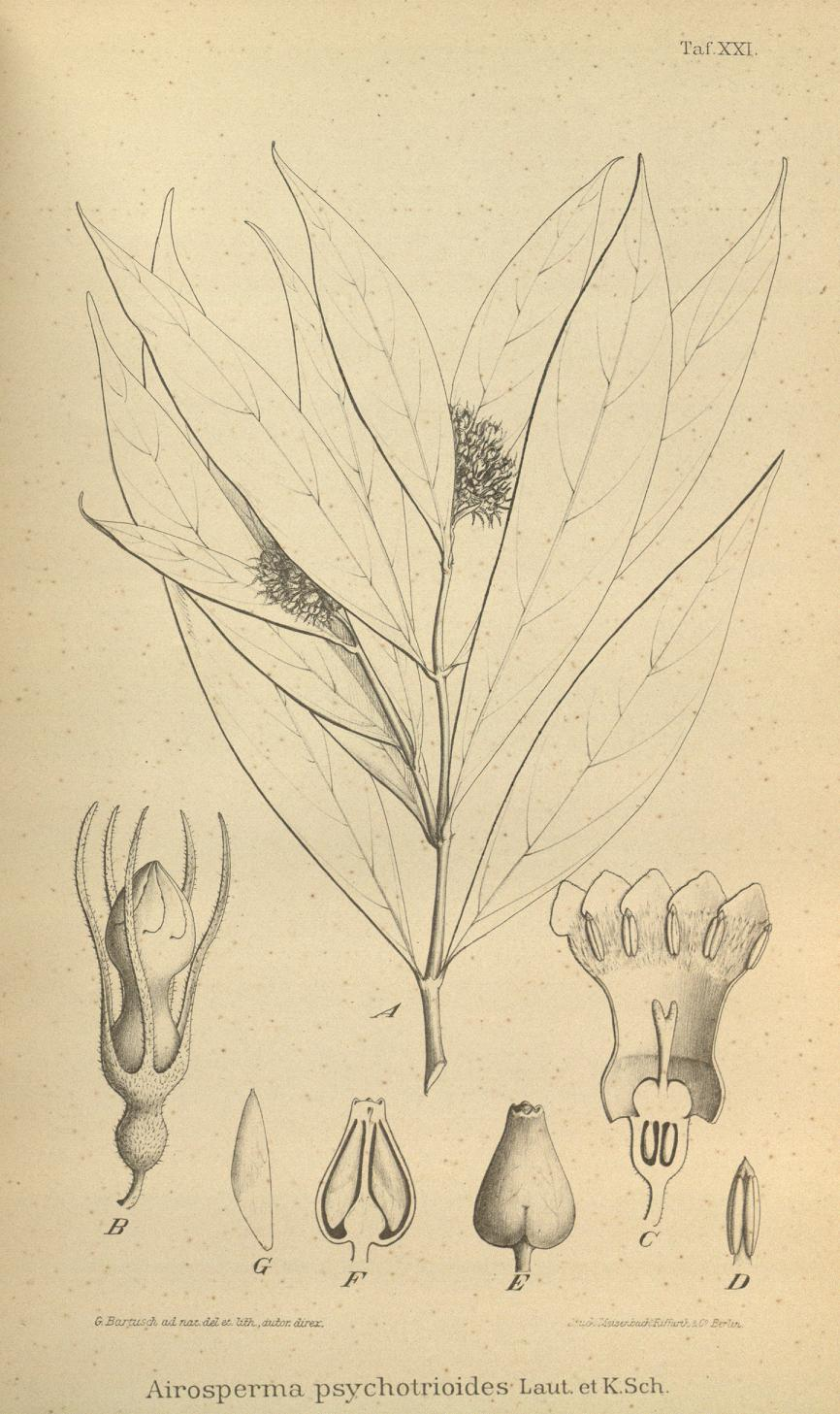
- Illustration of Airosperma psychotrioides from the protologue of the genus

Scientific classification
- Kingdom: Plantae
- Clade: Tracheophytes
- Clade: Angiosperms
- Clade: Eudicots
- Clade: Asterids
- Order: Gentianales
- Family: Rubiaceae
- Subfamily: Ixoroideae
- Genus: Airosperma; K.Schum. & Lauterb.

Synonyms
- Abramsia Gillespie

= Airosperma =

Genus of plants

Airosperma is a genus of flowering plants in the family Rubiaceae. It was described by Karl Moritz Schumann and Carl Adolf Georg Lauterbach in 1900. It contains six accepted species, all endemic either to New Guinea or to Fiji.

== Species ==
- Airosperma fuscum S.Moore - Papua New Guinea
- Airosperma grandifolia Valeton - Papua New Guinea
- Airosperma psychotrioides K.Schum. & Lauterb. - Papua New Guinea
- Airosperma ramuensis K.Schum. & Lauterb. - Papua New Guinea
- Airosperma trichotomum (Gillespie) A.C.Sm. - Viti Levu
- Airosperma vanuense S.P.Darwin - Vanua Levu, Taveuni
