= Ophiorrhiza gajureliana =

Scientific classification
- Kingdom: Plantae
- Clade: Embryophytes
- Clade: Tracheophytes
- Clade: Angiosperms
- Clade: Eudicots
- Clade: Asterids
- Order: Gentianales
- Family: Rubiaceae
- Genus: Ophiorrhiza
- Species: O. gajureliana

Binomial name
- Ophiorrhiza gajureliana Bawri & Baro

Species of flowering plant

Ophiorrhiza gajureliana is a species of Ophiorrhiza found only in the hill slopes of the Mayodia forest in the Indian state of Arunachal Pradesh. It was discovered in December 2024.

== Etymology ==
The species was named after Professor Padma Raj Gajurel for his contributions to plant and ethnobotanical research in the Indian Eastern Himalayan region.

== Distribution ==
It is found only in a small area on the hill slopes of the Mayodia forests in the Lower Dibang Valley District. Its population is estimated to be lower than 100. Currently its distribution is also less than 100 km^{2}.

== Conservation ==
As of 20 December 2024, it has not been assessed by the International Union for Conservation of Nature (IUCN). It has been evaluated by the team in the North Eastern Institute of Ayurveda and Folk Medicine Research (NEIAFMR), Arunachal Pradesh, and it has been assed to belong to the Critically Endangered (CR B1ab (iii)) category of IUCN.
