= Bertiera pauloi =

Conservation status
- Vulnerable (IUCN 3.1)

Scientific classification
- Kingdom: Plantae
- Clade: Tracheophytes
- Clade: Angiosperms
- Clade: Eudicots
- Clade: Asterids
- Order: Gentianales
- Family: Rubiaceae
- Genus: Bertiera
- Species: B. pauloi

Binomial name
- Bertiera pauloi Verdc.

Species of plant

Bertiera pauloi is a species of flowering plant in the family Rubiaceae. It is endemic to Tanzania.

== Sources ==
- Lovett, J. & Clarke, G.P. (1998). "Bertiera pauloi". IUCN Red List of Threatened Species. 1998 e.T34791A9885174. doi:10.2305/IUCN.UK.1998.RLTS.T34791A9885174.en.
