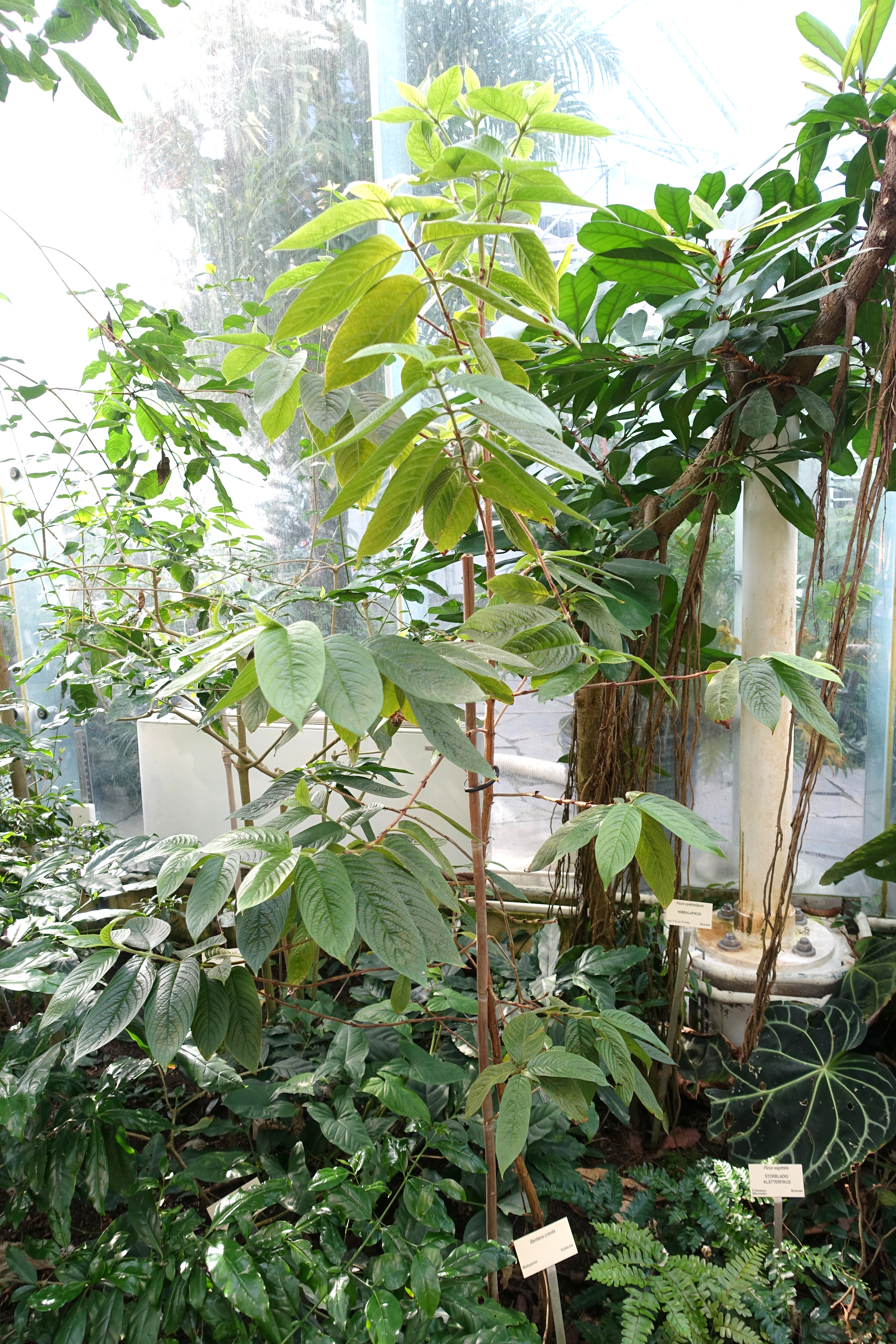
- Bertiera crinita

Scientific classification
- Kingdom: Plantae
- Clade: Embryophytes
- Clade: Tracheophytes
- Clade: Spermatophytes
- Clade: Angiosperms
- Clade: Eudicots
- Clade: Asterids
- Order: Gentianales
- Family: Rubiaceae
- Subfamily: Ixoroideae
- Tribe: Bertiereae
- Genus: Bertiera; Aubl.

Type species
- Bertiera guianensis Aubl.
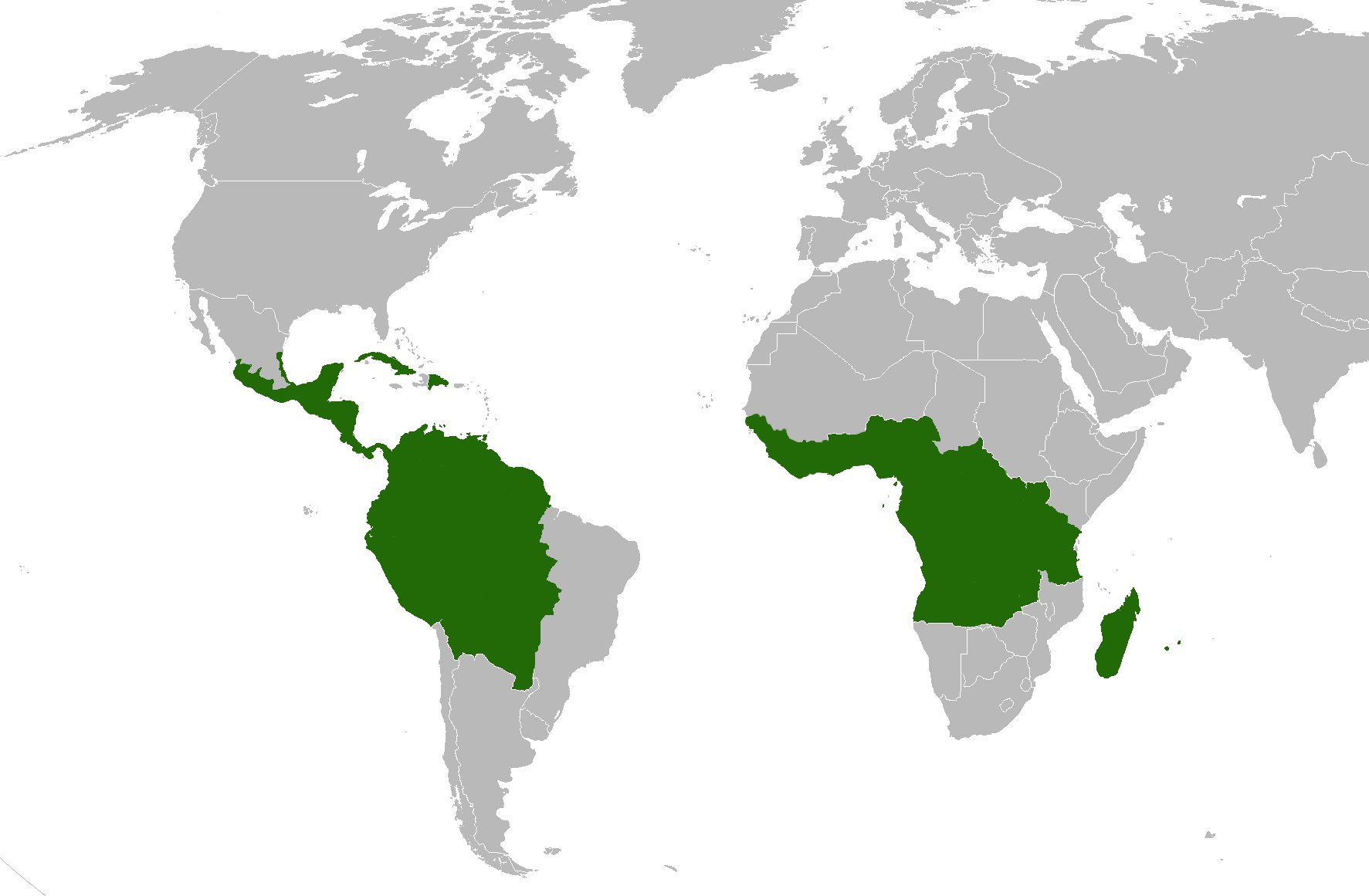

Synonyms
- Justenia Hiern; Pomatium C.F.Gaertn.; Zaluzania Pers.

= Bertiera =

Genus of flowering plants

Bertiera is a genus of flowering plants in the family Rubiaceae. It comprises 57 species with most known from tropical Africa, five known from various Indian Ocean islands and five found in the tropics of the Americas.

== Taxonomy ==
The genus Bertiera was described by Jean Baptiste Christophore Fusée Aublet in 1775 and the type species is Bertiera guianensis. It is the only genus in the tribe Bertiereae.

== Species ==
- Bertiera adamsii (Hepper) N.Hallé
- Bertiera aequatorialis N.Hallé
- Bertiera aethiopica Hiern
- Bertiera angusiana N.Hallé
- Bertiera angustifolia Benth.
- Bertiera annobonensis G.Taylor ex Mildbr.
- Bertiera arctistipula N.Hallé
- Bertiera batesii Wernham
- Bertiera bicarpellata (K.Schum.) N.Hallé
- Bertiera bistipulata Bojer ex Wernham
- Bertiera borbonica A.Rich. ex DC.
- Bertiera bracteolata Hiern
- Bertiera bracteosa (Donn.Sm.) B.Ståhl & L.Andersson
- Bertiera breviflora Hiern
- Bertiera brevithyrsa A.P.Davis
- Bertiera chevalieri Hutch. & Dalziel
- Bertiera congolana De Wild. & T.Durand
- Bertiera crinita (A.Rich.) Wittle & A.P.Davis
- Bertiera elabensis K.Krause
- Bertiera fimbriata Hepper
- Bertiera globiceps K.Schum.
- Bertiera gonzaleoides Griseb.
- Bertiera guianensis Aubl.
- Bertiera heterophylla Nguembou & Sonké
- Bertiera iturensis K.Krause
- Bertiera lanx N.Hallé
- Bertiera laurentii De Wild.
- Bertiera laxa Benth.
- Bertiera laxissima K.Schum.
- Bertiera ledermannii K.Krause
- Bertiera lejolyana Nguembou & Sonké
- Bertiera letouzeyi N.Hallé
- Bertiera longiloba K.Krause
- Bertiera longithyrsa Baker
- Bertiera loraria N.Hallé
- Bertiera lujae De Wild.
- Bertiera naucleoides (S.Moore) Bridson
- Bertiera orthopetala (Hiern) N.Hallé
- Bertiera parviflora Spruce ex K.Schum.
- Bertiera pauloi Verdc.
- Bertiera pedicellata (Hiern) Wernham
- Bertiera procumbens K.Schum. & K.Krause
- Bertiera pubiflora (Steyerm.) L.Andersson & B.Ståhl
- Bertiera racemosa (G.Don) K.Schum.
- Bertiera retrofracta K.Schum.
- Bertiera rosseeliana Sonké, Esono & Nguembou
- Bertiera rufa A.Rich. ex DC.
- Bertiera rugosa L.Andersson & C.H.Perss.
- Bertiera sphaerica N.Hallé
- Bertiera spicata (C.F.Gaertn.) K.Schum.
- Bertiera subsessilis Hiern
- Bertiera tessmannii K.Krause
- Bertiera thollonii N.Hallé
- Bertiera thonneri De Wild. & T.Durand
- Bertiera troupinii N.Hallé
- Bertiera viburnoides (Standl.) J.H.Kirkbr.
- Bertiera zaluzania Comm. ex C.F.Gaertn.
