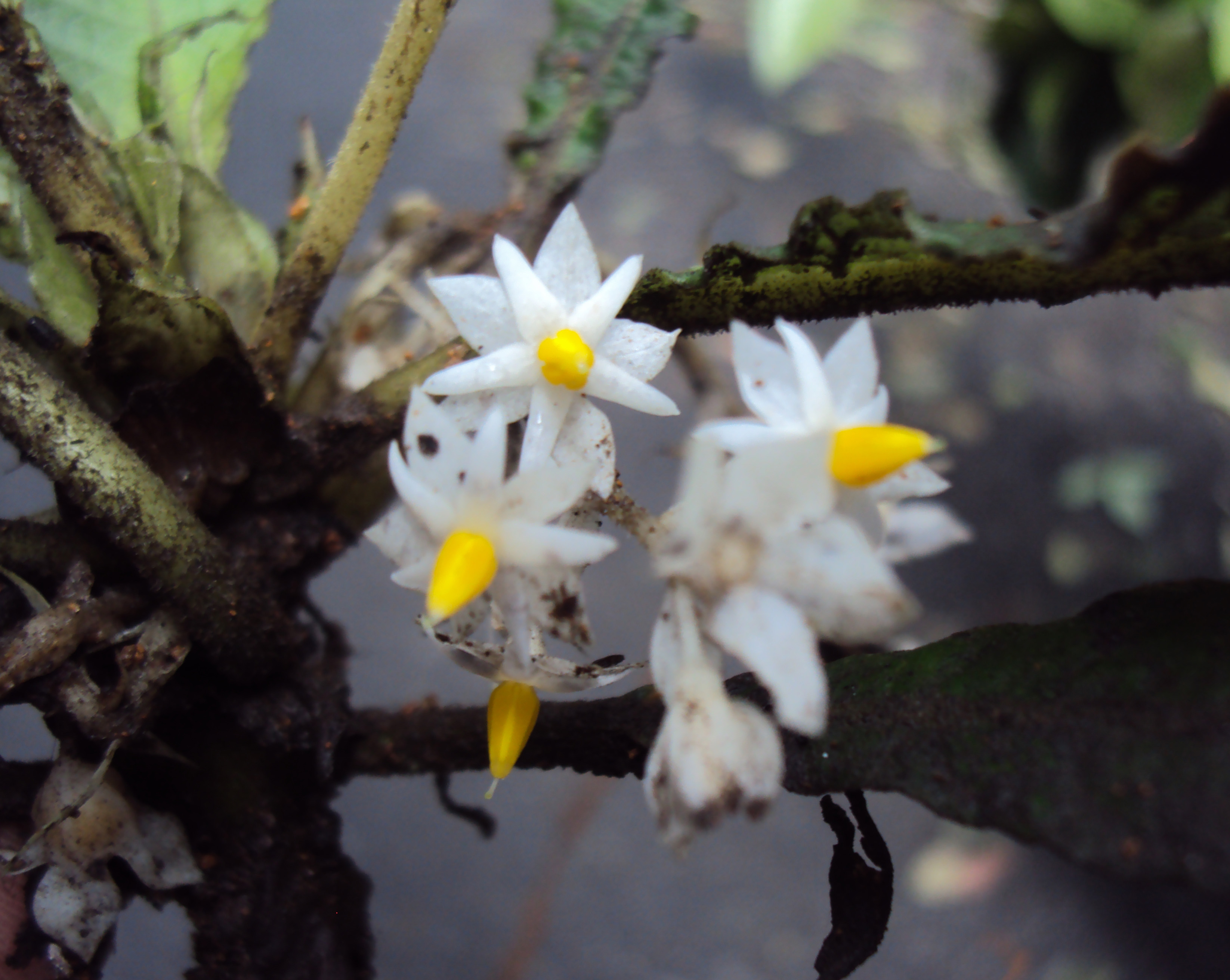
- Neurocalyx calycinus

Scientific classification
- Kingdom: Plantae
- Clade: Tracheophytes
- Clade: Angiosperms
- Clade: Eudicots
- Clade: Asterids
- Order: Gentianales
- Family: Rubiaceae
- Subfamily: Rubioideae
- Tribe: Ophiorrhizeae
- Genus: Neurocalyx; Hook.

Species
- See text

= Neurocalyx =

Genus of plants

Neurocalyx is a plant genus in the coffee family Rubiaceae. Species are found in southern India and Sri Lanka.

== Species ==
The Plant List and the World Checklist of Selected Plant Families recognise 5 accepted species:

- Neurocalyx bremeri M.B.Viswan., Manik. & Tangav.
- Neurocalyx calycinus (R.Br. ex Benn.) Rob.
- Neurocalyx championii Benth. ex Thwaites
- Neurocalyx gardneri Thwaites
- Neurocalyx zeylanicus Hook.
