= Trailliaedoxa =

Scientific classification
- Kingdom: Plantae
- Clade: Tracheophytes
- Clade: Angiosperms
- Clade: Eudicots
- Clade: Asterids
- Order: Gentianales
- Family: Rubiaceae
- Subfamily: Ixoroideae
- Tribe: Trailliaedoxeae
- Genus: Trailliaedoxa; W.W.Sm. & Forrest
- Species: T. gracilis

Binomial name
- Trailliaedoxa gracilis W.W.Sm. & Forrest

Genus of plants

Trailliaedoxa is a monotypic genus of flowering plants in the family Rubiaceae. The genus contains only one species, viz. Trailliaedoxa gracilis, which is endemic to south-central China. It is also the only species in the tribe Trailliaedoxeae.
