= Xanthophytum =

Scientific classification
- Kingdom: Plantae
- Clade: Tracheophytes
- Clade: Angiosperms
- Clade: Eudicots
- Clade: Asterids
- Order: Gentianales
- Family: Rubiaceae
- Subfamily: Rubioideae
- Tribe: Ophiorrhizeae
- Genus: Xanthophytum; Reinw. ex Blume

Type species
- Xanthophytum fruticulosum Reinw. ex Blume

Synonyms
- Paedicalyx Pierre ex Pit.; Siderobombyx Bremek.; Xanthophytopsis Pit.

Genus of plants

Xanthophytum is a genus of flowering plants in the family Rubiaceae. The genus is found from tropical and subtropical Asia to the southwestern Pacific.

== Species ==
- Xanthophytum alopecurum Axelius
- Xanthophytum attopevense (Pierre ex Pit.) H.S.Lo
- Xanthophytum balansae (Pit.) H.S.Lo
- Xanthophytum borneense (Valeton) Axelius
- Xanthophytum brookei Axelius
- Xanthophytum bullatum Tange
- Xanthophytum calycinum (A.Gray) Benth. & Hook.f. ex Drake
- Xanthophytum capitatum Valeton
- Xanthophytum capitellatum Ridl.
- Xanthophytum cylindricum Axelius
- Xanthophytum ferrugineum (DC.) Merr.
- Xanthophytum foliaceum Axelius
- Xanthophytum fruticulosum Reinw. ex Blume
- Xanthophytum glabrum Axelius
- Xanthophytum glomeratum Valeton ex Bakh.f.
- Xanthophytum grandiflorum Axelius
- Xanthophytum grandifolium Valeton ex Bakh.f.
- Xanthophytum involucratum Merr.
- Xanthophytum johannis-winkleri Merr.
- Xanthophytum kinabaluense (Bremek.) Tange
- Xanthophytum kwangtungense (Chun & F.C.How) H.S.Lo
- Xanthophytum longipedunculatum Merr.
- Xanthophytum magnisepalum Axelius
- Xanthophytum minus Axelius
- Xanthophytum nitens Axelius
- Xanthophytum olivaceum Merr.
- Xanthophytum papuanum Wernham
- Xanthophytum polyanthum Pit.
- Xanthophytum pubistylosum Axelius
- Xanthophytum semiorbiculare (Bakh.f.) Axelius
- Xanthophytum sessile Axelius
- Xanthophytum setosum Axelius
