= Cremaspora =

Scientific classification
- Kingdom: Plantae
- Clade: Tracheophytes
- Clade: Angiosperms
- Clade: Eudicots
- Clade: Asterids
- Order: Gentianales
- Family: Rubiaceae
- Subfamily: Ixoroideae
- Tribe: Cremasporeae; Bremek. ex S.P.Darwin
- Genus: Cremaspora; Benth.

Type species
- Cremaspora africana (syn. of Cremaspora triflora subsp. triflora) Benth.

Synonyms
- Pappostylum Pierre; Schizospermum Boivin ex Baill.

Genus of plants

Cremaspora is a genus of flowering plants in the family Rubiaceae. It is the only genus in the tribe Cremasporeae. It was described by George Bentham in 1849. The genus is widespread across much of sub-Saharan Africa from Senegal to Tanzania and south to Mozambique and Zimbabwe, in addition to Madagascar, Comoros, and Cape Verde. There are, however, only two currently recognized species.

== Species ==
- Cremaspora thomsonii Hiern - Nigeria, Central African Republic, Cameroon, Gabon
- Cremaspora triflora (Thonn.) K.Schum.
  - Cremaspora triflora subsp. comorensis (Baill.) Verdc. - Comoros, Madagascar
  - Cremaspora triflora subsp. confluens (K.Schum.) Verdc. - Kenya, Tanzania, Malawi, Mozambique
  - Cremaspora triflora subsp. triflora - Cape Verde, tropical Africa
