= Sherbournieae =

Scientific classification
- Kingdom: Plantae
- Clade: Tracheophytes
- Clade: Angiosperms
- Clade: Eudicots
- Clade: Asterids
- Order: Gentianales
- Family: Rubiaceae
- Subfamily: Ixoroideae
- Tribe: Sherbournieae; Mouly & B.Bremer

Tribe of angiosperms

Sherbournieae is a tribe of flowering plants in the family Rubiaceae and contains 54 species in 4 genera. Its representatives are found in tropical and southern Africa.

== Genera ==
Currently accepted names

- Atractogyne Pierre (2 sp)
- Mitriostigma Hochst. (5 sp)
- Oxyanthus DC. (34 sp)
- Sherbournia G.Don (13 sp)

Synonyms

- Afrohamelia Wernham = Atractogyne
- Amaralia Welw. ex Hook.f. = Sherbournia
- Megacarpha Hochst. = Oxyanthus
