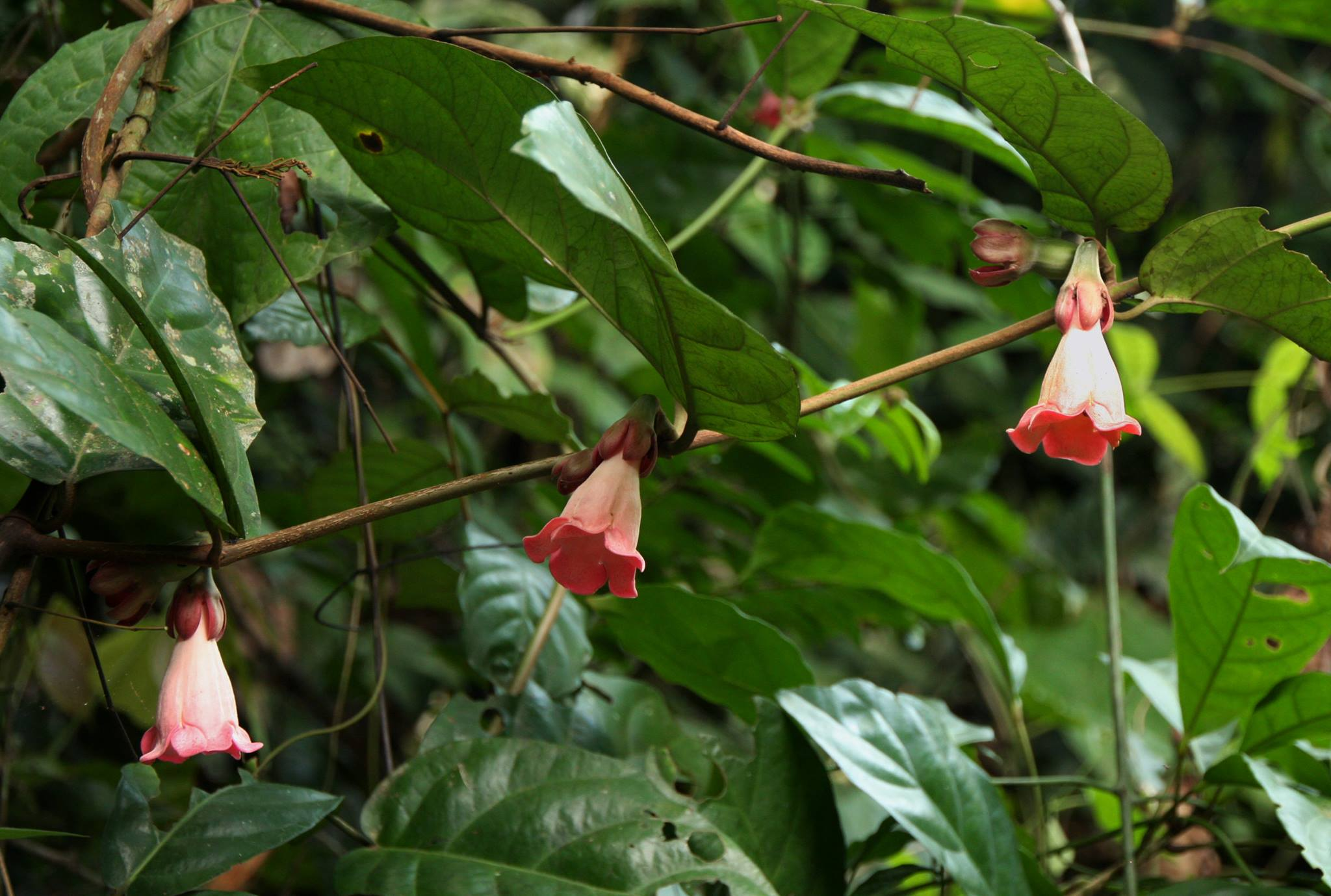

Scientific classification
- Kingdom: Plantae
- Clade: Embryophytes
- Clade: Tracheophytes
- Clade: Angiosperms
- Clade: Eudicots
- Clade: Asterids
- Order: Gentianales
- Family: Rubiaceae
- Subfamily: Ixoroideae
- Tribe: Sherbournieae
- Genus: Sherbournia; G.Don

Synonyms
- Amaralia Welw. ex Hook.f.

= Sherbournia =

Genus of plants

Sherbournia is a genus of flowering plants in the family Rubiaceae. It comprises 13 currently recognized species. It was named after British botanist Margaret Sherbourne (1791–1846).
