= Aleisanthieae =

Scientific classification
- Kingdom: Plantae
- Clade: Tracheophytes
- Clade: Angiosperms
- Clade: Eudicots
- Clade: Asterids
- Order: Gentianales
- Family: Rubiaceae
- Subfamily: Ixoroideae
- Tribe: Aleisanthieae; Mouly, J.Florence & B.Bremer

Type genus
- Aleisanthia Ridl.

Tribe of angiosperms

Aleisanthieae is a tribe of flowering plants in the family Rubiaceae and contains 10 species in 3 genera. Its representatives are found in Borneo, Malaysia, and the Philippines.

== Genera ==
Currently accepted names

- Aleisanthia Ridl. (2 sp) - Malaysia
- Aleisanthiopsis Tange (2 sp) - Borneo
- Greeniopsis Merr. (6 sp) - Philippines
