= Margaret Sherbourne =

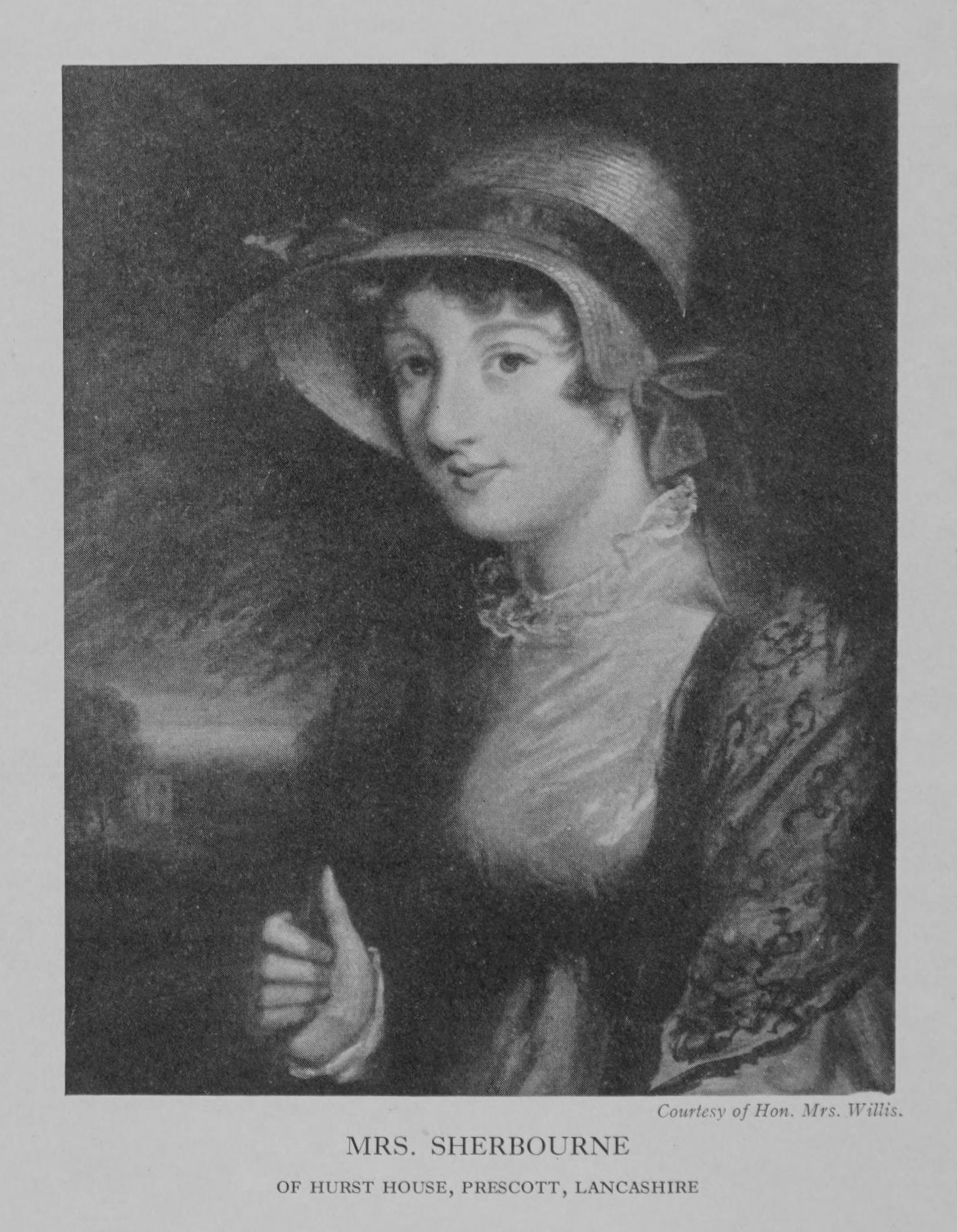

Margaret Dorothea Sherbourne née Willis (3 October 1791 – 6 November 1846) was a British plant enthusiast and gardener. She grew many tropical plants in her garden and a genus Sherbournia was named in her honour.

Margaret Dorothea Willis was the first daughter of Richard Willis of Halsnead, Prescot, Lancashire (now in Merseyside). In 1821 she married the forty-five years older Charles Robert Sherbourne of Hurst House, Prescot, who died in 1836. She collected and grew plants in Hurst House including a number of tropical species. She began to correspond with Sir William Hooker at Kew from 1842. She grew a plant from Sierra Leone that flowered in her garden and from which it was described and named as Sherbournia foliosa after her by George Don but this was later called as Sherbournia calycina.
