= Oxyanthus tubiflorus =

Scientific classification
- Kingdom: Plantae
- Clade: Tracheophytes
- Clade: Angiosperms
- Clade: Eudicots
- Clade: Asterids
- Order: Gentianales
- Family: Rubiaceae
- Genus: Oxyanthus
- Species: O. tubiflorus

Binomial name
- Oxyanthus tubiflorus (Andrews) DC.

Synonyms
- Gardenia tubiflora Andrews; Oxyanthus speciosus W.T.Aiton

Species of flowering plant

Oxyanthus tubiflorus, commonly called the needle flower, is a shrub in the family Rubiaceae. It is native to Sierra Leone, Guinea and probably neighboring Liberia. It produces flowers up to 7 inches (18 cm) long. The leaves are opposite and 3 to seven inches (7 to 17 centimeters) long by 1 to 3 inches (2.5 to 7.6 centimeters) wide. It is pollinated by a species of sphinx moth.
