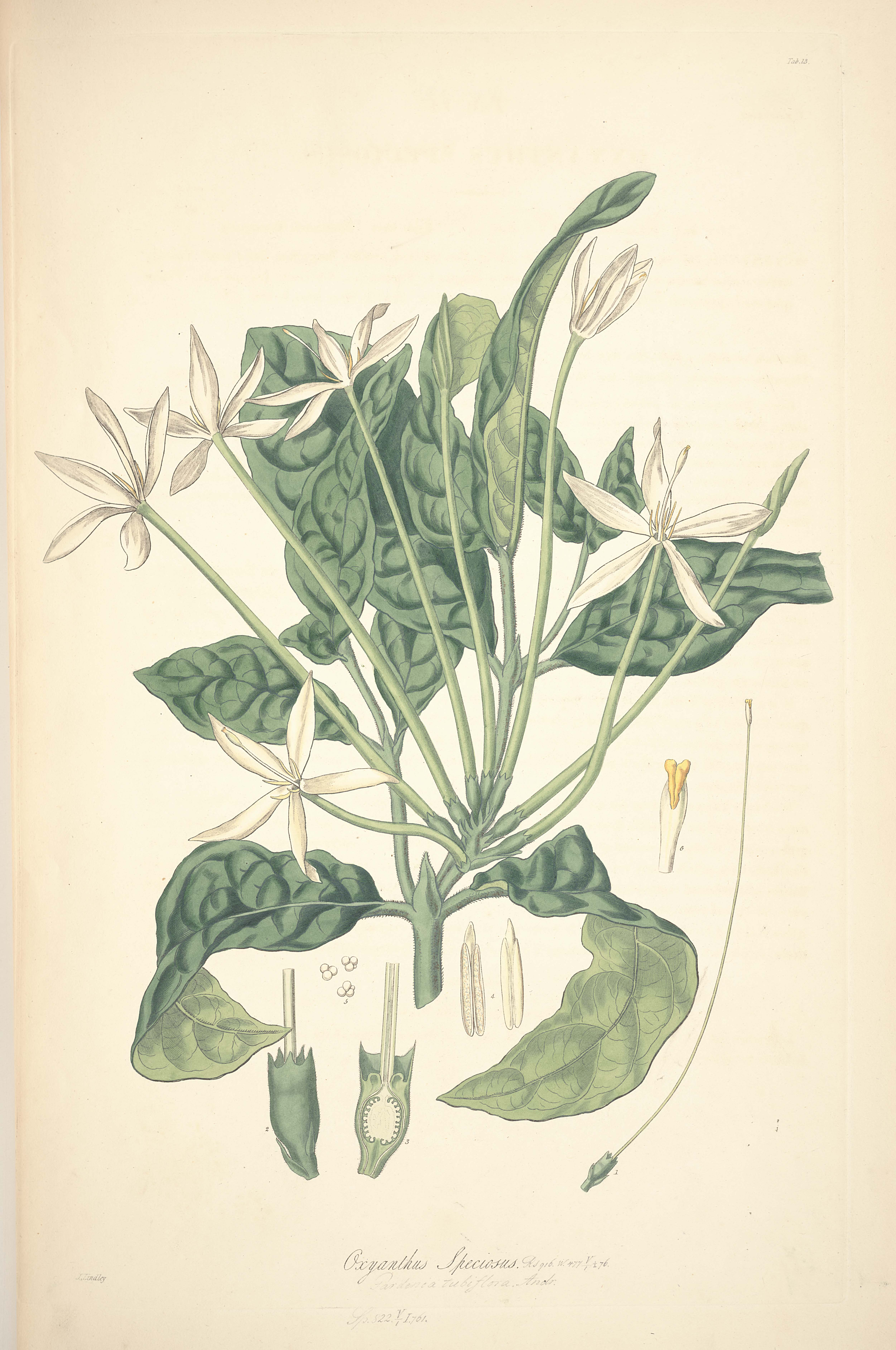
- Oxyanthus speciosus

Scientific classification
- Kingdom: Plantae
- Clade: Tracheophytes
- Clade: Angiosperms
- Clade: Eudicots
- Clade: Asterids
- Order: Gentianales
- Family: Rubiaceae
- Tribe: Sherbournieae
- Genus: Oxyanthus; DC.

Synonyms
- Megacarpha Hochst.

= Oxyanthus =

Genus of plants

Oxyanthus is a genus of plant in family Rubiaceae, first described in 1807 by Augustin Pyramus de Candolle, a Swiss botanist.

As of January 2026, Plants of the World Online accepts the following 34 species:

- Oxyanthus andjigae Sonké & O.Lachenaud
- Oxyanthus barensis K.Krause
- Oxyanthus biflorus J.E.Burrows & S.M.Burrows
- Oxyanthus brevicaulis K.Krause
- Oxyanthus doucetii Sonké & O.Lachenaud
- Oxyanthus formosus Hook.f.
- Oxyanthus goetzei K.Schum.
- Oxyanthus gracilis Hiern
- Oxyanthus haerdii Bridson
- Oxyanthus latifolius Sond.
- Oxyanthus laxiflorus K.Schum. ex Hutch. & Dalziel
- Oxyanthus ledermannii K.Krause
- Oxyanthus letouzeyanus Sonké
- Oxyanthus lewisii Sonké & O.Lachenaud
- Oxyanthus montanus Sonké
- Oxyanthus nangensis K.Krause
- Oxyanthus okuensis Cheek & Sonké
- Oxyanthus oliganthus K.Schum.
- Oxyanthus pallidus Hiern
- Oxyanthus pyriformis (Hochst.) Skeels
- Oxyanthus querimbensis Klotzsch
- Oxyanthus racemosus (Schumach. & Thonn.) Keay
- Oxyanthus robbrechtianus Sonké
- Oxyanthus schumannianus De Wild. & T.Durand
- Oxyanthus setosus Keay
- Oxyanthus smithii Hiern
- Oxyanthus speciosus DC.
- Oxyanthus strigosus Bridson & J.E.Burrows
- Oxyanthus subpunctatus (Hiern) Keay
- Oxyanthus troupinii Bridson
- Oxyanthus tubiflorus (Andrews) DC.
- Oxyanthus ugandensis Bridson
- Oxyanthus unilocularis Hiern
- Oxyanthus zanguebaricus (Hiern) Bridson
