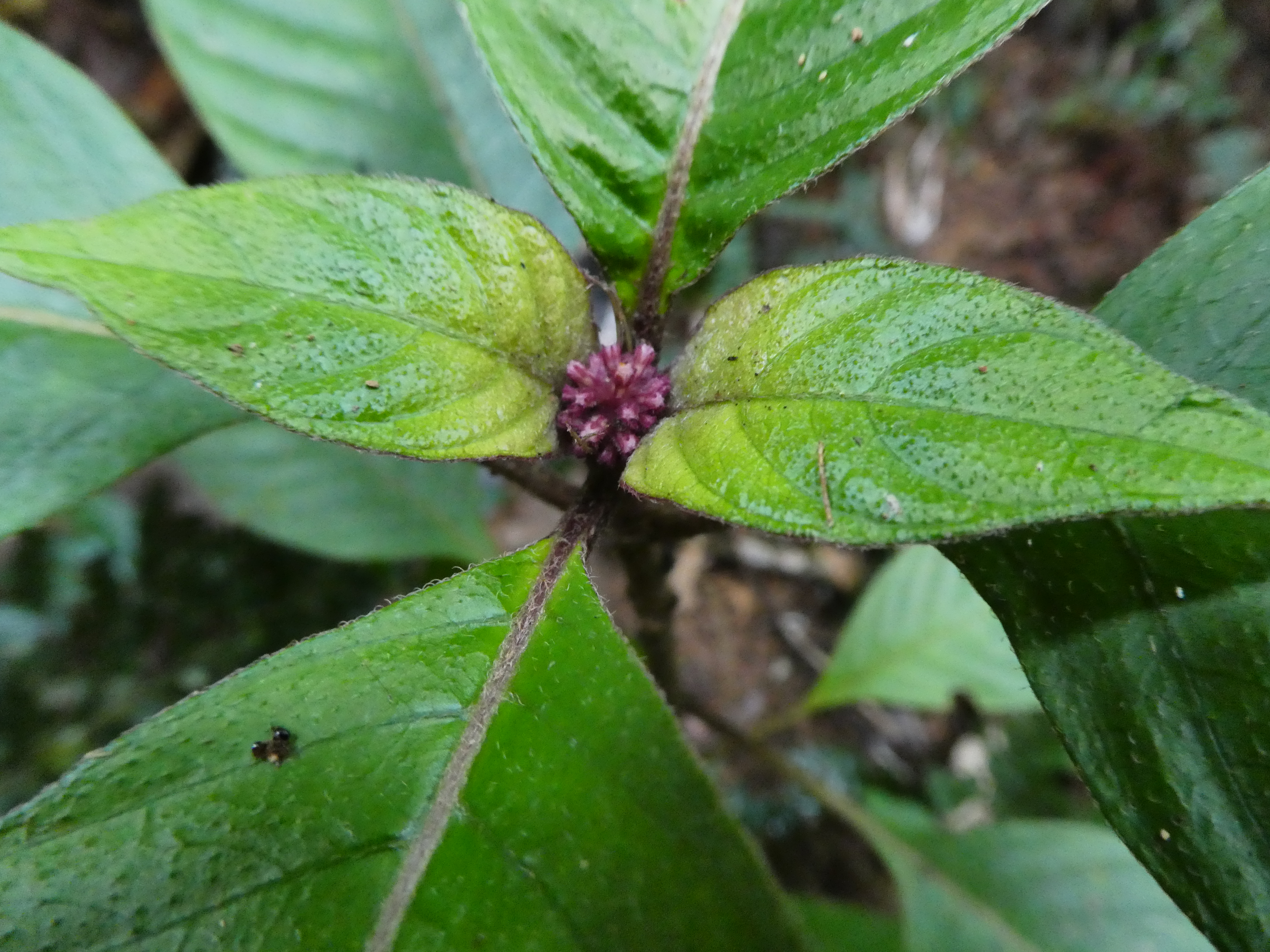
- Flower buds

Conservation status
- Least Concern (NCA)

Scientific classification
- Kingdom: Plantae
- Clade: Tracheophytes
- Clade: Angiosperms
- Clade: Eudicots
- Clade: Asterids
- Order: Gentianales
- Family: Rubiaceae
- Genus: Ophiorrhiza
- Species: O. australiana

Binomial name
- Ophiorrhiza australiana Benth.

= Ophiorrhiza australiana =

Australian snakeroot

Species of flowering plant

Ophiorrhiza australiana, commonly known as Australian snakeroot, is a rainforest shrub in the coffee family Rubiaceae found only in the Wet Tropics bioregion of Queensland, Australia. It was first described in 1867 by the English botanist George Bentham.

Two subspecies are recognised:

- Ophiorrhiza australiana subsp. australiana
- Ophiorrhiza australiana subsp. heterostyla Halford

== Conservation ==
This species is listed as least concern under the Queensland Government's Nature Conservation Act. As of 19 October 2024, it has not been assessed by the International Union for Conservation of Nature (IUCN).
