= Mitriostigma barteri =

Conservation status
- Endangered (IUCN 3.1)

Scientific classification
- Kingdom: Plantae
- Clade: Tracheophytes
- Clade: Angiosperms
- Clade: Eudicots
- Clade: Asterids
- Order: Gentianales
- Family: Rubiaceae
- Genus: Mitriostigma
- Species: M. barteri

Binomial name
- Mitriostigma barteri Hook.f. ex Hiern

Synonyms
- Randia barteri (Hook.f. ex Hiern) K.Schum.

Species of plant

Mitriostigma barteri is a species of plant in the family Rubiaceae. It is found in Cameroon and Equatorial Guinea. Its natural habitat is subtropical or tropical moist lowland forests. It is threatened by habitat loss.

== Sources ==
- Cheek, M. (2004). "Mitrostigma barteri". IUCN Red List of Threatened Species. 2004 e.T45915A11023369. doi:10.2305/IUCN.UK.2004.RLTS.T45915A11023369.en.
