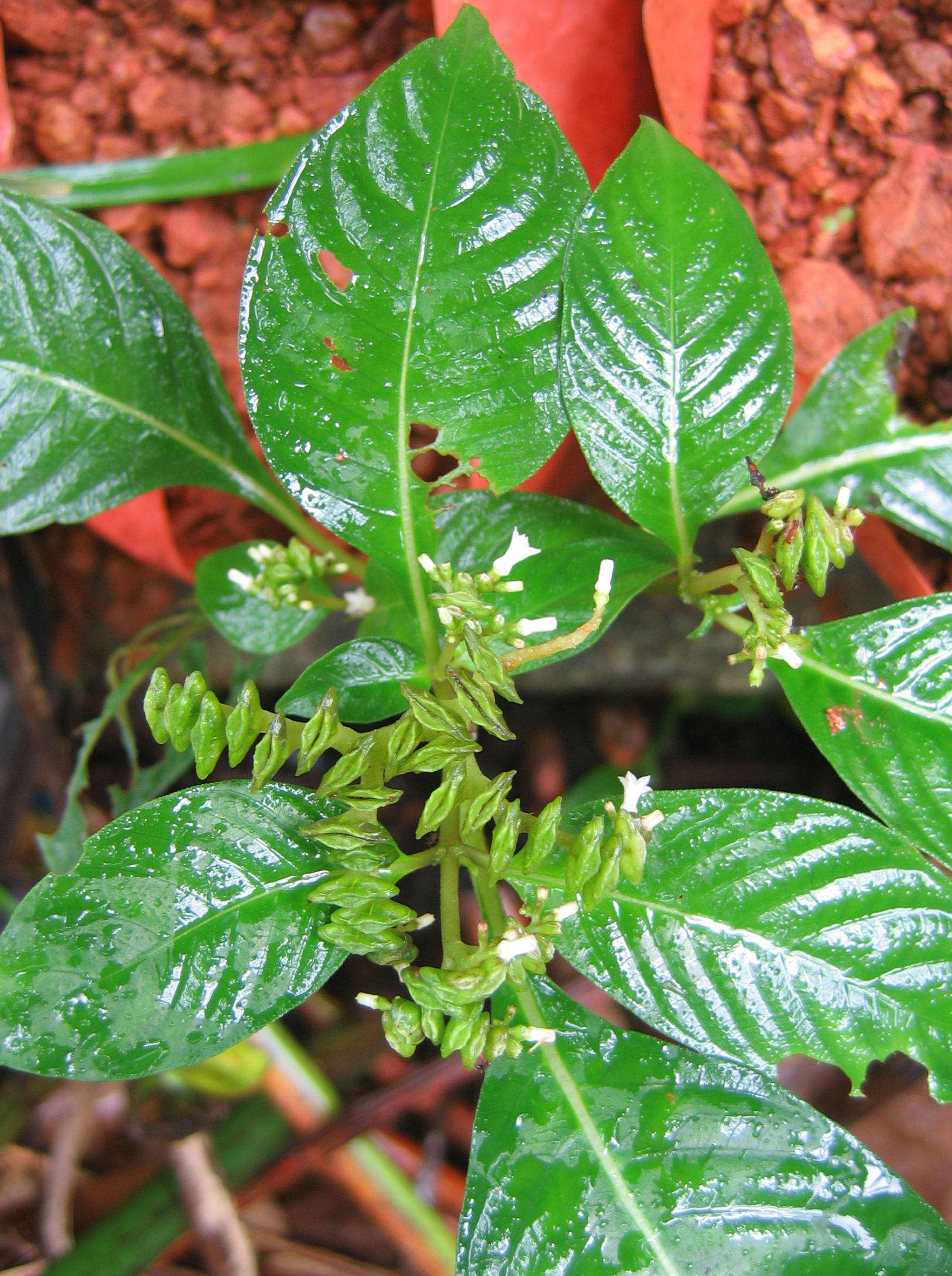
- Ophiorrhiza mungos

Scientific classification
- Kingdom: Plantae
- Clade: Embryophytes
- Clade: Tracheophytes
- Clade: Spermatophytes
- Clade: Angiosperms
- Clade: Eudicots
- Clade: Asterids
- Order: Gentianales
- Family: Rubiaceae
- Subfamily: Rubioideae
- Tribe: Ophiorrhizeae
- Genus: Ophiorrhiza; L.

Species
- 378; see text

Synonyms
- Campanocalyx Valeton; Hayataella Masam.; Keenania Hook.f.; Mitreola Boehm.; Mungos Adans.; Pleotheca Wall., nom. nud.; Spiradiclis Blume

= Ophiorrhiza =

Genus of plants

Ophiorrhiza is a genus of flowering plants in the coffee family (Rubiaceae). It contains 378 species native to the Indian subcontinent, Indochina, China, Taiwan, Japan, Malesia, Papuasia, Queensland, and the South Pacific. Species of the genus contain camptothecin, an alkaloid used to make chemotherapeutic agents. Many Ophiorrhiza species are endemic to certain areas of the Western Ghats.

Species include:

- Ophiorrhiza acuminata
- Ophiorrhiza australiana
- Ophiorrhiza gajureliana
- Ophiorrhiza biflora
- Ophiorrhiza blumeana
- Ophiorrhiza bracteata
- Ophiorrhiza cantoniensis
- Ophiorrhiza carinata
- Ophiorrhiza caudata
- Ophiorrhiza dulongensis
- Ophiorrhiza filistipula
- Ophiorrhiza japonica
- Ophiorrhiza jomyi
- Ophiorrhiza kuroiwai
- Ophiorrhiza liukiuensis
- Ophiorrhiza longiflora
- Ophiorrhiza lurida
- Ophiorrhiza major
- Ophiorrhiza michelloides
- Ophiorrhiza mungos
- Ophiorrhiza nutans
- Ophiorrhiza prostrata
- Ophiorrhiza pumila
- Ophiorrhiza rosea
- Ophiorrhiza rugosa
- Ophiorrhiza succirubra
- Ophiorrhiza meenachilarensis
