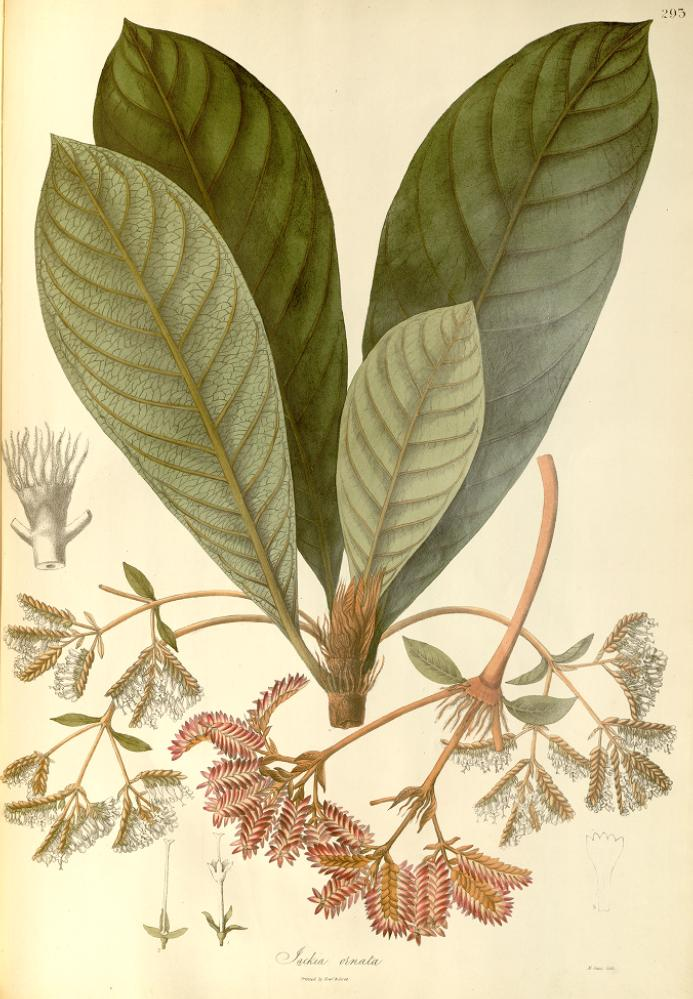
- Jackiopsis ornata

Scientific classification
- Kingdom: Plantae
- Clade: Tracheophytes
- Clade: Angiosperms
- Clade: Eudicots
- Clade: Asterids
- Order: Gentianales
- Family: Rubiaceae
- Subfamily: Ixoroideae
- Tribe: Jackieae
- Genus: Jackiopsis; Ridsdale
- Species: J. ornata

Binomial name
- Jackiopsis ornata (Wall.) Ridsdale

Synonyms
- Jackia ornata Wall.; Zuccarinia ornata (Wall.) Spreng.

= Jackiopsis =

Genus of plants

Jackiopsis is a monotypic genus of flowering plants in the family Rubiaceae. It was described by Colin Ernest Ridsdale in 1979. The genus contains only one species, viz. Jackiopsis ornata, which is found in Borneo, Malaysia and Sumatra. It is also the only species in the tribe Jackieae.

According to Henry Nicholas Ridley, Malay name for Jackiopsis ornata is segan paya.
