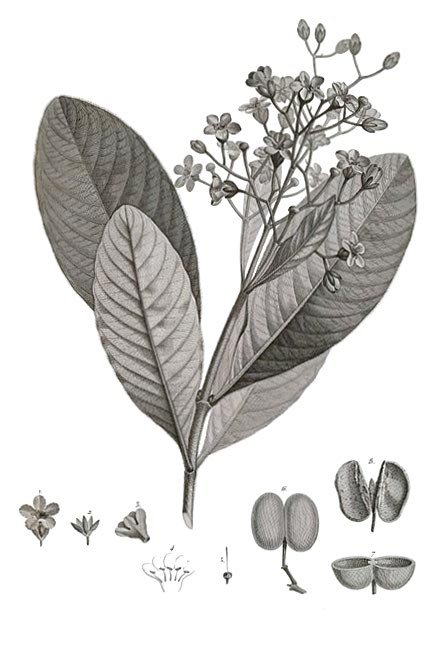
- Platycarpum orenocense

Scientific classification
- Kingdom: Plantae
- Clade: Tracheophytes
- Clade: Angiosperms
- Clade: Eudicots
- Clade: Asterids
- Order: Gentianales
- Family: Rubiaceae
- Genus: Platycarpum; Bonpl.

= Platycarpum =

Genus of plants

Platycarpum is a genus of flowering plants belonging to the family Rubiaceae.

Its native range is tropical South America.

Species:

- Platycarpum acreanum G.K.Rogers
- Platycarpum decipiens Woodson & Steyerm.
- Platycarpum duckei Steyerm.
- Platycarpum eglandulosum Steyerm.
- Platycarpum egleri G.K.Rogers
- Platycarpum froesii Bremek.
- Platycarpum loretensis N.Dávila & Kin.-Gouv.
- Platycarpum maguirei Steyerm.
- Platycarpum negrense Ducke
- Platycarpum orinocense Humb. & Bonpl.
- Platycarpum rhododactylum Woodson & Steyerm.
- Platycarpum rugosum Steyerm.
- Platycarpum schultesii Steyerm.
- Platycarpum vriesendorpiae N.Dávila
