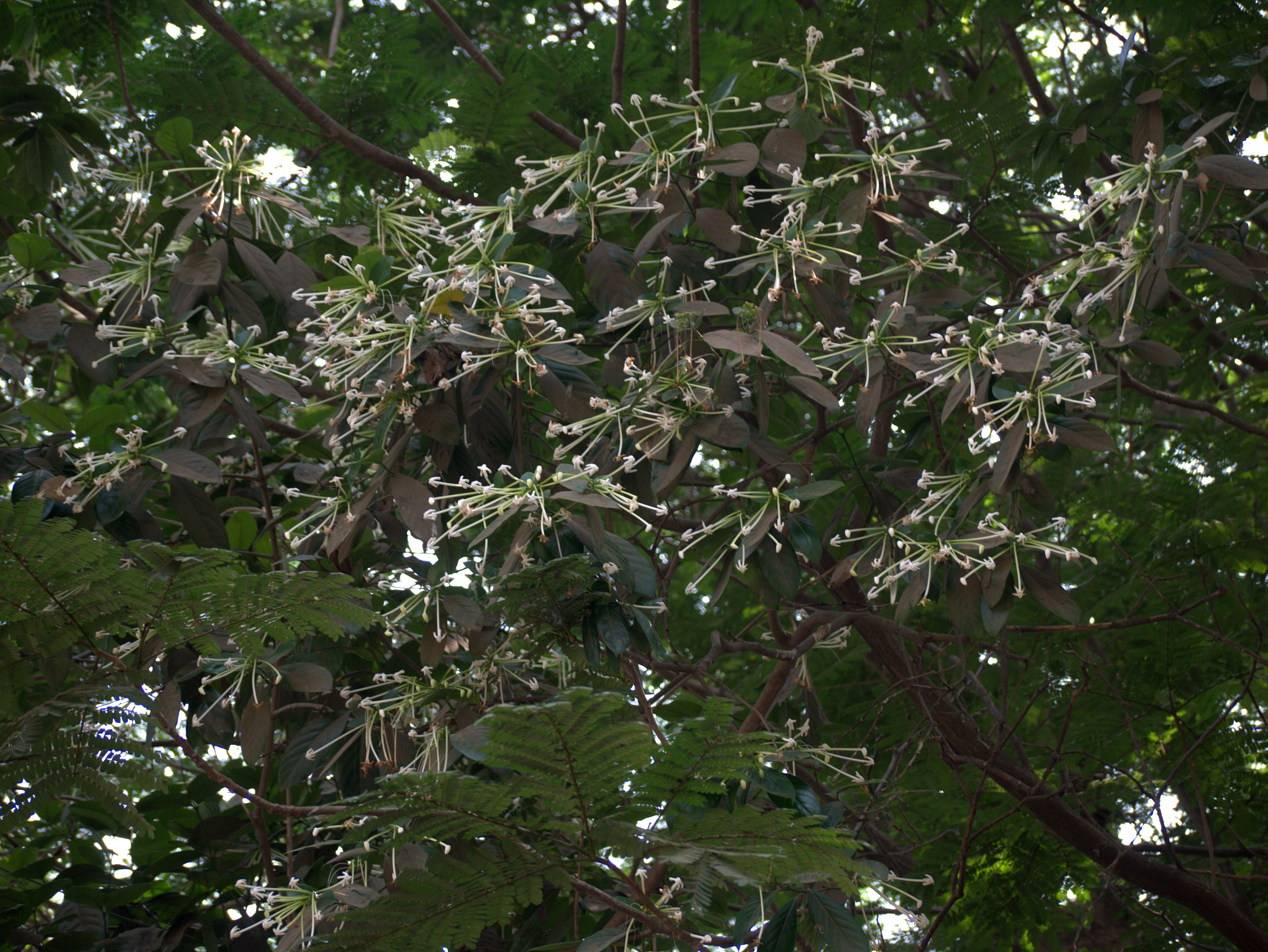

Conservation status
- Least Concern (IUCN 3.1)

Scientific classification
- Kingdom: Plantae
- Clade: Tracheophytes
- Clade: Angiosperms
- Clade: Eudicots
- Clade: Asterids
- Order: Gentianales
- Family: Rubiaceae
- Genus: Posoqueria
- Species: P. longiflora

Binomial name
- Posoqueria longiflora Aubl.

Synonyms
- Kyrtanthus longiflorus (Aubl.) J.F.Gmel.; Solena longiflora (Aubl.) Willd.; Tocoyena undulatifolia A.Rich.; Posoqueria acuminata Mart.; Willdenovia schreberi J.F.Gmel.

= Posoqueria longiflora =

Species of flowering plant

Posoqueria longiflora, also known as needle flower tree or needle flower is a species of shrub or tree in the family Rubiaceae native to subtropical or tropical moist lowland forest of Northern South America.

== Description ==
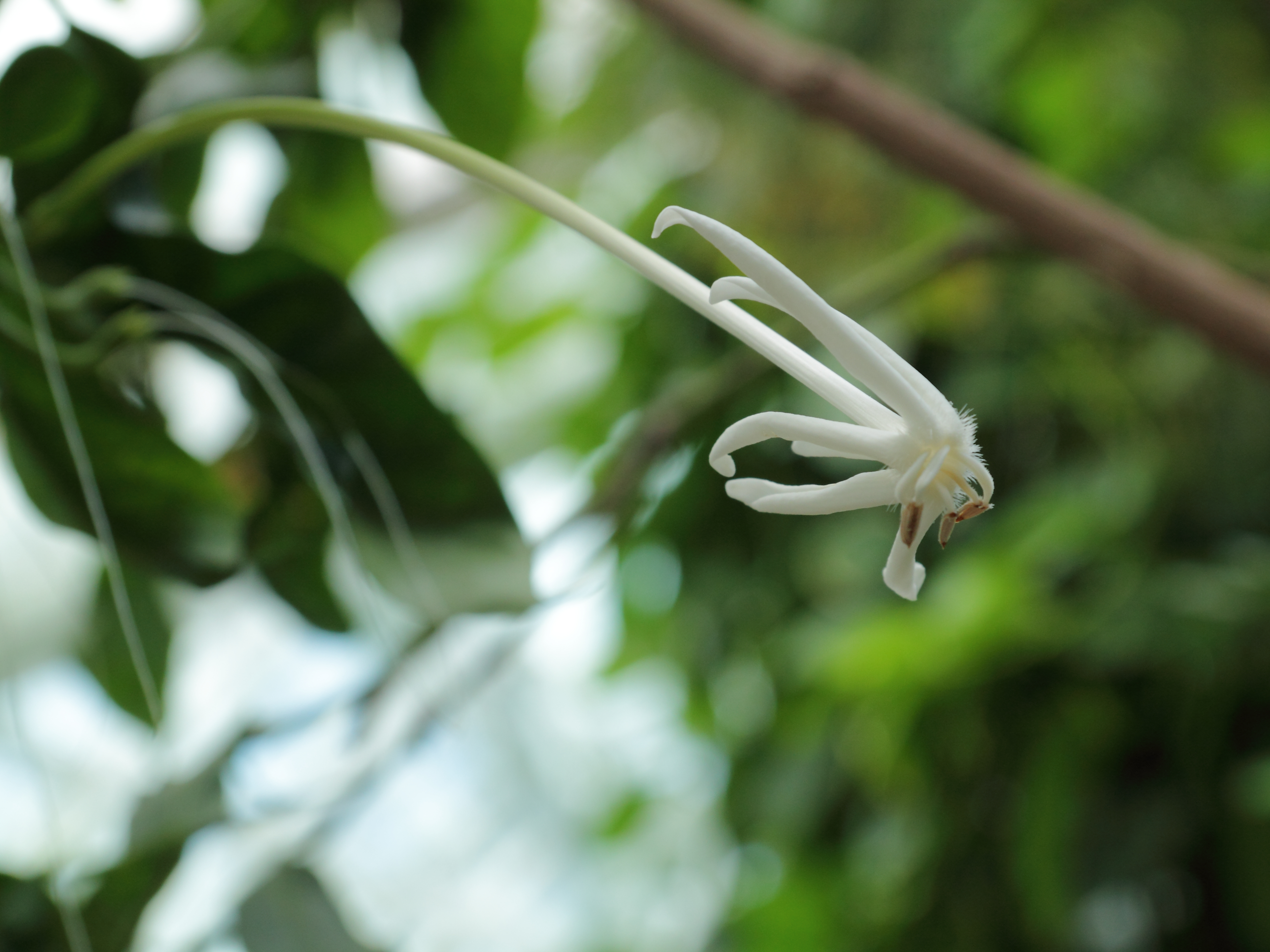
Detail of Posoqueria longiflora flower

=== Vegetative characteristics ===
Posoqueria longiflora is a 2–5 m tall shrub or tree bearing lanceolate, acuminate leaves with a wavy leaf margin.

=== Generative characteristics ===
The pendent, elegant, terminal inflorescences bear fragrant, nectariferous, sphingophilous, tubular, pure white, flowers 28–35 cm (rarely to 38 cm) long, while not over 2 mm diameter. The five petals are reflexed. The yellow or orange fruit has five linear, pointed, leathery, persistent sepals.

== Taxonomy ==
It was described by Jean Baptiste Christophore Fusée Aublet in 1775. It is the type species of its genus.

=== Etymology ===
The specific epithet longiflora means having long flowers.

== Ecology ==
=== Pollination ===
It is pollinated by a sphinx moth. When a sphinx moth inserts its proboscis into the flower, it touches a trigger mechanism which causes the four lateral stamens (two pairs) to move away from the center, while the middle stamen lunges forward like a catapult coating the lower surface of the moth with pollen to pollinate the stigma of the next flower visited. The role of the lateral stamens remains unclear.

=== Herbivory ===
The fruit is eaten by fish.

== Use ==
The fruit is edible and sweet. It is used as bait for fishing.
