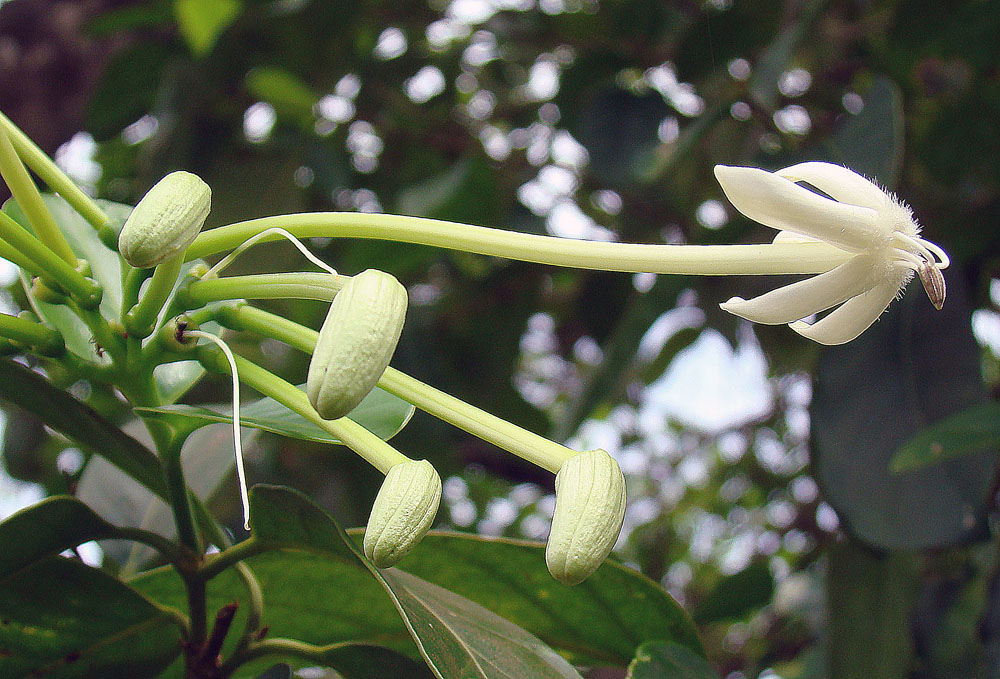
- On Bastimentos Island, Panama
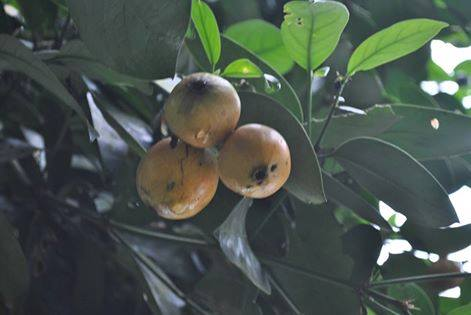

Conservation status
- Least Concern (IUCN 3.1)

Scientific classification
- Kingdom: Plantae
- Clade: Tracheophytes
- Clade: Angiosperms
- Clade: Eudicots
- Clade: Asterids
- Order: Gentianales
- Family: Rubiaceae
- Genus: Posoqueria
- Species: P. latifolia

Binomial name
- Posoqueria latifolia (Rudge) Schult.

Subspecies
- See here
- It is native to the region spanning from Mexico to tropical South America

Synonyms
- Solena latifolia Rudge; Tocoyena latifolia (Rudge) Poir.

= Posoqueria latifolia =

Species of plant

Posoqueria latifolia, also known as Needle Flower Tree, is a species of shrub or tree in the family Rubiaceae native to the region spanning from Mexico to tropical South America. Its most remarkable feature is the floral tube of the white flower, which is only 2 or 3 mm wide, but up to 17 cm (6.7 in) long. It is pollinated by a sphinx moth.

== Description ==
=== Vegetative characteristics ===
Posoqueria latifolia is a 3–25 m tall shrub or tree with smooth, gray bark and numerous branches.

=== Generative characteristics ===
The terminal inflorescence bears pedicellate, tubular, elongate, sphingophilous, nectariferous, fragrant, conspicuous, white flowers. The flower has five petals. The yellow fruit bears numerous seeds.

=== Cytology ===
The chromosome count is 2n = 32, 34, or 36.

== Taxonomy ==
It was first described as Solena latifolia Rudge by Edward Rudge in 1805. It was transferred to the genus Posoqueria Aubl. as Posoqueria latifolia (Rudge) Schult. by Josef August Schultes in 1819. Sometimes Josef August Schultes and Johann Jacob Roemer are credited with the transfer.

=== Etymology ===
The specific epithet latifolia means broad-leaved.

=== Subspecies ===
It has two subspecies:

- Posoqueria latifolia subsp. gracilis (Rudge) Steyerm.
- Posoqueria latifolia subsp. latifolia

== Distribution and habitat ==
It occurs in lowland tropical rainforest and in cloud forests of Belize, Bolivia, Brazil, Colombia, Costa Rica, Cuba, Ecuador, El Salvador, French Guiana, Guatemala, Guyana, Honduras, Mexico, Nicaragua, Panama, Peru, Suriname, and Venezuela.

== Ecology ==
The flowers are moth-pollinated. The fruit is eaten by mammals. The seeds are dispersed by animals, such as monkeys.

== Conservation ==
The IUCN conservation status is Least Concern (LC).

== Use ==
The sweet or poorly flavoured, yellow fruit is edible. It is used as an ornamental plant.

== Common names ==
It has many common names: Needle Flower Tree, Tree Jasmine, Guayaba de Mono, Boca de vieja., Azuceno de monte, and baga-de-macaco.
