= Neobertiera =

Scientific classification
- Kingdom: Plantae
- Clade: Tracheophytes
- Clade: Angiosperms
- Clade: Eudicots
- Clade: Asterids
- Order: Gentianales
- Family: Rubiaceae
- Genus: Neobertiera; Wernham

Genus of plants

Neobertiera is a genus of flowering plants belonging to the family Rubiaceae.

Its native range is the Guianas, it is found in northern Brazil, French Guiana and Guyana.

The genus name of Neobertiera is in honour of Bertier, a French Guianese woman who helped French botanist Jean Baptiste Christophore Fusée Aublet with native plants, including this genus, which was found on her property. The Latin specific epithet of guianensis means "of the Guianas" (an area of north eastern South America). It was first described and published in J. Bot. Vol.55 on page 169 in 1917.

== Known species ==
According to Kew:

- Neobertiera gracilis Wernham
- Neobertiera micrantha Delprete
- Neobertiera montedouradensis Delprete
- Neobertiera pakaraimensis Delprete
- Neobertiera palustris (A.Rich. ex DC.) Delprete
