= Neblinathamnus =

Scientific classification
- Kingdom: Plantae
- Clade: Tracheophytes
- Clade: Angiosperms
- Clade: Eudicots
- Clade: Asterids
- Order: Gentianales
- Family: Rubiaceae
- Genus: Neblinathamnus; Steyerm.

Genus of plants

Neblinathamnus is a genus of flowering plants belonging to the family Rubiaceae.

Its native range is Guyana Highlands.

== Species ==
Species:

- Neblinathamnus argyreus Steyerm.
- Neblinathamnus brasiliensis Steyerm.
