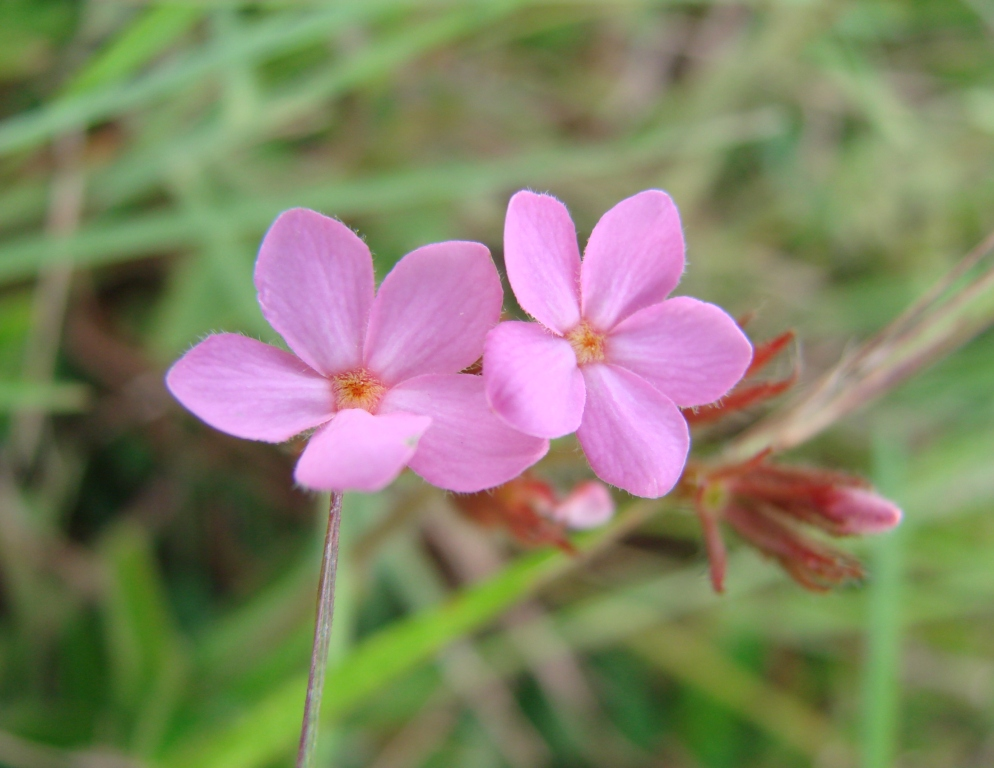
- Sipanea hispida in Brazil

Scientific classification
- Kingdom: Plantae
- Clade: Tracheophytes
- Clade: Angiosperms
- Clade: Eudicots
- Clade: Asterids
- Order: Gentianales
- Family: Rubiaceae
- Genus: Sipanea; Aubl.

= Sipanea =

Genus of plants

Sipanea is a genus of flowering plants belonging to the family Rubiaceae.

Its native range is Trinidad to Central and Southern Tropical America.

== Species ==
Species:

- Sipanea ayangannensis Steyerm.
- Sipanea biflora (Rottb.) Cham. & Schltdl.
- Sipanea carrenoi Steyerm.
- Sipanea cowanii Steyerm.
- Sipanea galioides Wernham
- Sipanea glaberrima (Bremek.) Steyerm.
- Sipanea glabrata Wernham
- Sipanea gleasonii Steyerm.
- Sipanea glomerata Kunth
- Sipanea hispida Benth. ex Wernham
- Sipanea micrantha Sandwith
- Sipanea ovalifolia Bremek.
- Sipanea prancei Steyerm.
- Sipanea pratensis Aubl.
- Sipanea saxicola J.H.Kirkbr.
- Sipanea setacea Steyerm.
- Sipanea stahelii Bremek.
- Sipanea veris S.Moore
- Sipanea wilson-brownei Cowan
