= Limnosipanea =

Scientific classification
- Kingdom: Plantae
- Clade: Tracheophytes
- Clade: Angiosperms
- Clade: Eudicots
- Clade: Asterids
- Order: Gentianales
- Family: Rubiaceae
- Genus: Limnosipanea; Hook.f.

Genus of plants

Limnosipanea is a genus of flowering plants belonging to the family Rubiaceae.

Its native range is Panama to Southern Tropical America.

Species:

- Limnosipanea erythraeoides (Cham.) K.Schum.
- Limnosipanea palustris (Seem.) Hook.f.
- Limnosipanea spruceana Hook.f.
