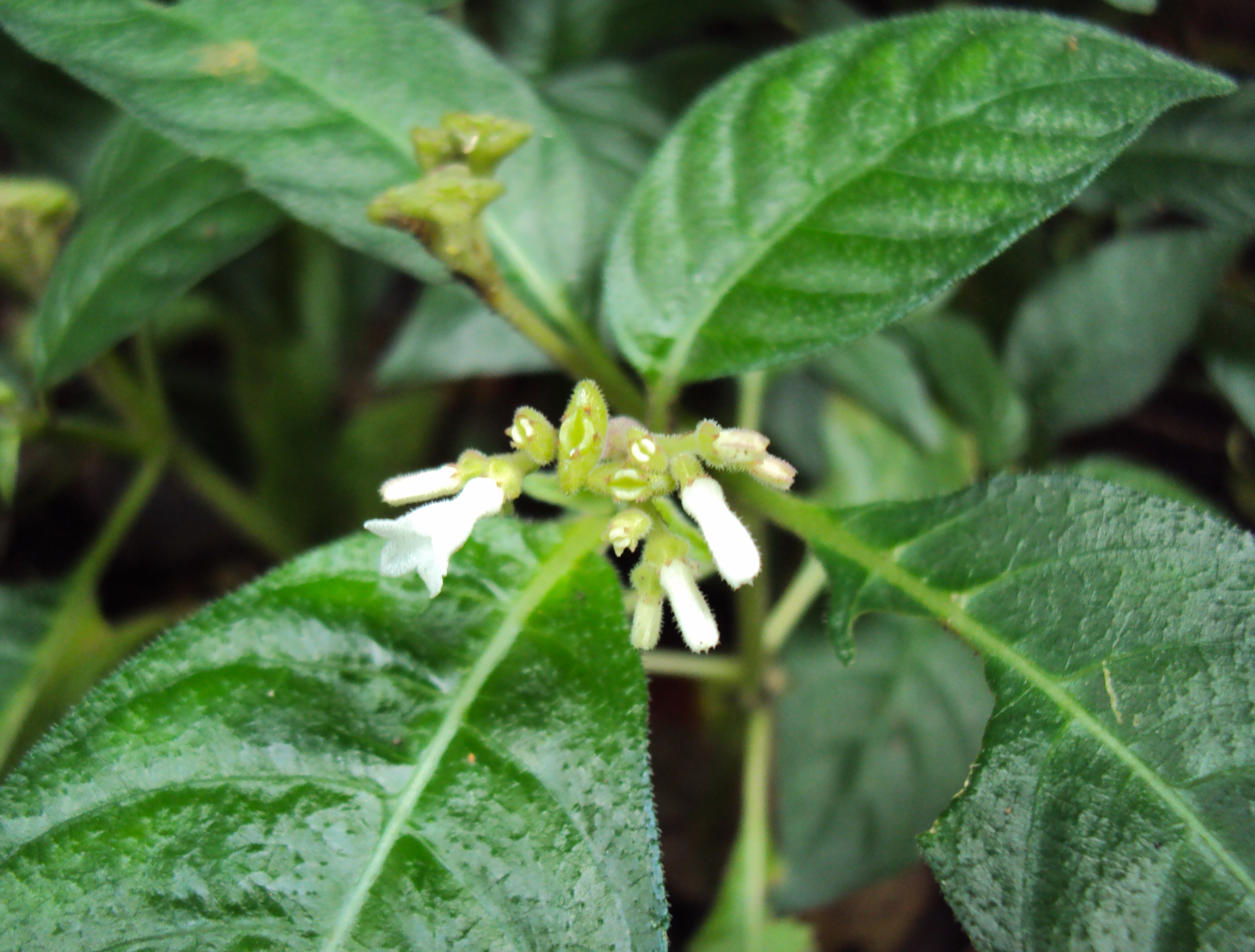
- Ophiorrhiza mungos

Scientific classification
- Kingdom: Plantae
- Clade: Tracheophytes
- Clade: Angiosperms
- Clade: Eudicots
- Clade: Asterids
- Order: Gentianales
- Family: Rubiaceae
- Subfamily: Rubioideae
- Tribe: Ophiorrhizeae; Bremek. ex Verdc.

Type genus
- Ophiorrhiza L.

= Ophiorrhizeae =

Tribe of plants

Ophiorrhizeae is a tribe of flowering plants in the family Rubiaceae and contains about 364 species in 4 genera. Its representatives are found from tropical and subtropical Asia to the Pacific region.

== Genera ==
Currently accepted names

- Lerchea L. (10 sp.) - China, Vietnam, Java, Sumatra
- Neurocalyx Hook. (5 sp.) - India, Sri Lanka
- Ophiorrhiza L. (317 sp.) - tropical and subtropical Asia to the Pacific region
- Xanthophytum Reinw. ex Blume (32 sp.) - tropical and subtropical Asia to the southwestern Pacific region

Synonyms

- Codaria Kuntze = Lerchea
- Hayataella Masam. = Ophiorrhiza
- Mitreola Boehm. = Ophiorrhiza
- Mungos Adans. = Ophiorrhiza
- Notodontia Pierre ex Pit. = Lerchea
- Paedicalyx Pierre ex Pit. = Xanthophytum
- Polycycliska Ridl. = Lerchea
- Siderobombyx Bremek. = Xanthophytum
- Xanthophytopsis Pit. = Xanthophytum
