= Reinier Cornelis Bakhuizen van den Brink (born 1911) =

Dutch botanist

Reinier Cornelis Bakhuizen van den Brink Jr. (11 September 1911, Panjinangan, Sukabumi Regency, Java – 1 May 1987, Leiden) was a Dutch botanist.

He was the son of Djahini of Tjiampea and Dutch botanist Reinier Cornelis Bakhuizen van den Brink (1881–1945) of the Dutch East Indies.

== Selected works ==
- "A contribution to the knowledge of the Melastomataceae occurring in the Malay Archipelago especially in the Netherlands East Indies". Mededelingen van het Botanisch Museum en Herbarium van de Rijksuniversiteit te Utrecht. 91 (1). 1943. Abbreviated as Contr. Melastom.

== Taxonomy ==
The abbreviation stands for "Bakhuizen filius".
