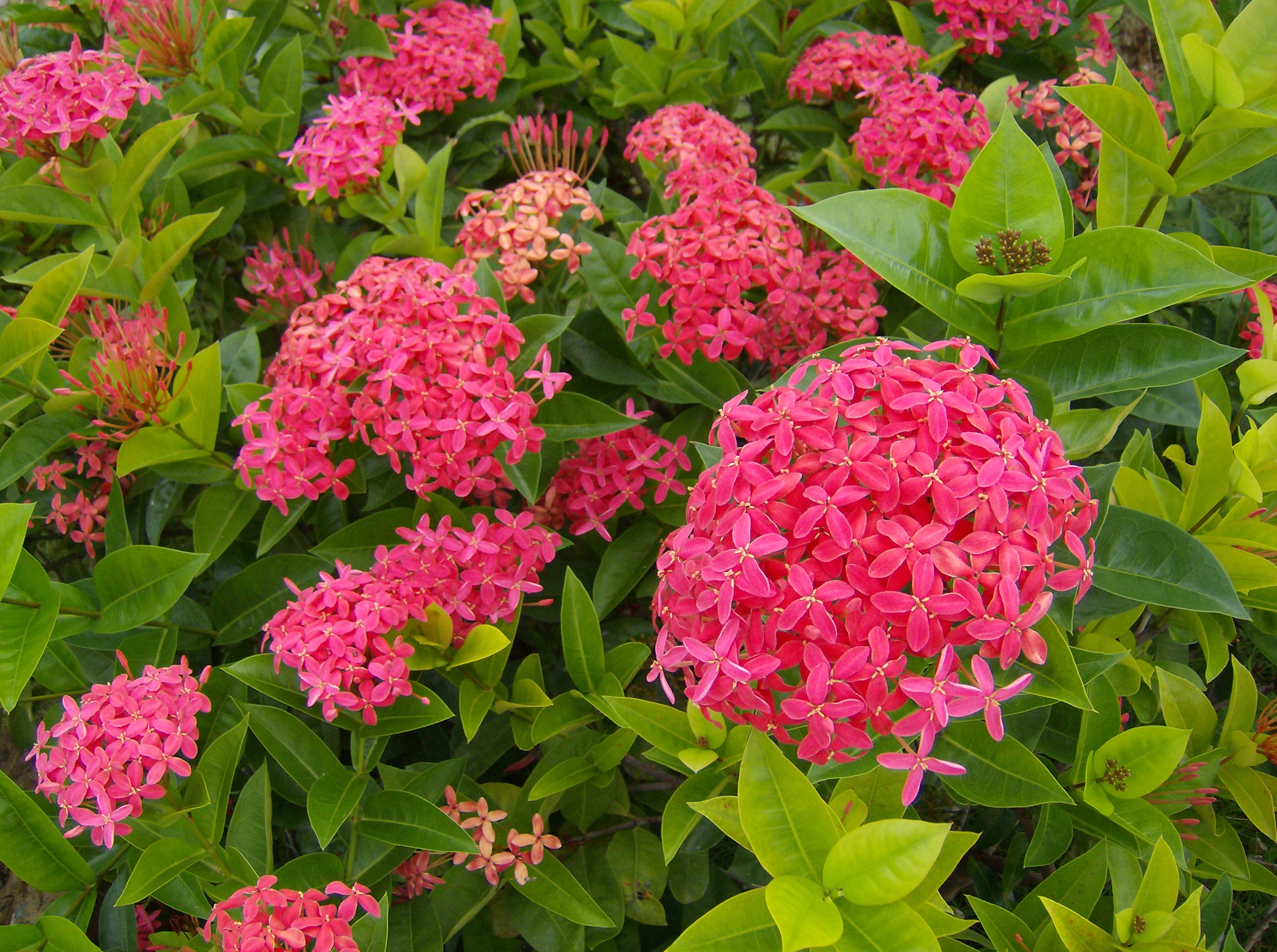
- Ixora coccinea

Scientific classification
- Kingdom: Plantae
- Clade: Tracheophytes
- Clade: Angiosperms
- Clade: Eudicots
- Clade: Asterids
- Order: Gentianales
- Family: Rubiaceae
- Subfamily: Ixoroideae; Raf.

= Ixoroideae =

Subfamily of flowering plants

Ixoroideae is a subfamily of flowering plants in the family Rubiaceae and contains about 4000 species in 27 tribes.

== Tribes ==
- Airospermeae Kainul. & B.Bremer
- Alberteae Hook.f.
- Aleisanthieae Mouly, J.Florence & B.Bremer
- Augusteae Kainul. & B.Bremer
- Bertiereae Bridson
- Coffeeae DC.
- Condamineeae Hook.f.
- Cordiereae A.Rich. ex DC. emend. Mouly
- Cremasporeae Bremek. ex S.P.Darwin
- Crossopterygeae F.White ex Bridson
- Gardenieae A.Rich. ex DC.
- Greeneeae Mouly, J.Florence & B.Bremer
- Henriquezieae Benth. & Hook.f.
- Ixoreae Benth. & Hook.f.
- Jackieae Korth.
- Mussaendeae Hook.f.
- Octotropideae Bedd.
- Pavetteae A.Rich. ex Dumort.
- Posoquerieae Delprete
- Retiniphylleae Hook.f.
- Sabiceeae Bremek.
- Scyphiphoreae Kainul. & B.Bremer
- Sherbournieae Mouly & B.Bremer
- Sipaneeae Bremek.
- Steenisieae Kainul. & B.Bremer
- Trailliaedoxeae Kainul. & B.Bremer
- Vanguerieae A.Rich. ex Dumort.

== Classification ==
Ixoroideae is a subfamily of the family Rubiaceae. Based on both morphological and molecular characters, Rubiaceae has been divided into three subfamilies - Ixoroideae, Cinchonoideae, and Rubioideae. Ixoroideae and Cinchoinoideae are more closely related. Members of Ixoroideae are morphologically diverse so no shared derived characters have been established for its classification. Introduction of molecular analyses to systematics dramatically improved tribal classification within the subfamily. Present tribal classification within this subfamily is mainly supported through molecular analysis of chloroplast DNA.

== Cultivation and use ==
Ixoroideae consists of 27 tribes that include several economically valuable genera. Well-known genera within the subfamily include Ixora and Gardenia, both popular ornamentals, but economic value is centered on the genus Coffea, cultivated for coffee production. Three species are generally used for cultivation - Coffea arabica, Coffea robusta, and Coffea liberica
