= Perama (disambiguation) =

Perama is a city near Athens, Greece.

Perama may also refer to:

- Perama, Ioannina, a municipal unit in the Ioannina regional unit, Greece
- Perama, Rethymno, a village in the Rethymno regional unit, Greece, part of Geropotamos
- Perama (plant), a plant genus from the madder family (Rubiaceae)
