= Danais (plant) =

Scientific classification
- Kingdom: Plantae
- Clade: Tracheophytes
- Clade: Angiosperms
- Clade: Eudicots
- Clade: Asterids
- Order: Gentianales
- Family: Rubiaceae
- Subfamily: Rubioideae
- Tribe: Danaideae
- Genus: Danais; Comm. ex Vent.

Type species
- Danais fragrans (Lam.) Pers.

Synonyms
- Alleizettea Dubard & Dop

Genus of plants

Danais is a genus of flowering plants in the family Rubiaceae. Most species are native to Madagascar; at least three others are distributed in Tanzania, Comoros, and the Mascarene Islands.

These are climbing plants with flowers in shades of white, yellow, orange, red, blue, or purple. The flowers have very slender tubes and are adapted for pollination by moths, such as hawkmoths. The plants often have an unpleasant scent, but some flowers have a sweet fragrance.

== Species ==
- Danais andribensis Homolle - Madagascar
- Danais aurantiaca Homolle - Madagascar
- Danais baronii Homolle - Madagascar
- Danais breviflora Baker - Madagascar
- Danais brickavillensis J.-F.Leroy ex Puff & Buchner - Madagascar
- Danais capituliformis Homolle - Madagascar
- Danais cernua Baker - Madagascar
- Danais comorensis Drake - Mayotte
- Danais coronata (Pers.) Steud. - Madagascar
- Danais corymbosa Balf.f. - Rodrigues (possibly extinct, last collected in 1874)
- Danais dauphinensis Cavaco - Madagascar
- Danais distinctinervia Homolle - Madagascar
- Danais fragrans (Lam.) Pers. - Madagascar, Mauritius, Réunion
- Danais hispida Baker - Madagascar
- Danais humblotii Homolle - Comoros, Madagascar
- Danais ligustrifolia Baker - Madagascar
- Danais longipedunculata Homolle - Madagascar
- Danais magna Puff & Buchner - Madagascar
- Danais microcarpa Baker - Madagascar
- Danais nigra Homolle - Madagascar
- Danais pauciflora Baker - Madagascar
- Danais pubescens Baker - Madagascar
- Danais rhamnifolia Baker - Madagascar
- Danais rubra Puff & Buchner - Madagascar
- Danais sulcata Pers. - Mauritius
- Danais terminalis Boivin ex Drake - Madagascar
- Danais tsaratananensis Homolle - Madagascar
- Danais verticillata Baker - Madagascar
- Danais vestita Baker - Madagascar
- Danais volubilis Baker - Madagascar
- Danais xanthorrhoea (K.Schum.) Bremek. - Tanzania
