= Seychellea (disambiguation) =

Seychellea may refer to:

- Seychellea, a genus of flowering plants in the family Rubiaceae
- Seychellea, a synonym of genus Amblygobius of bony fish in the family Gobiidae
