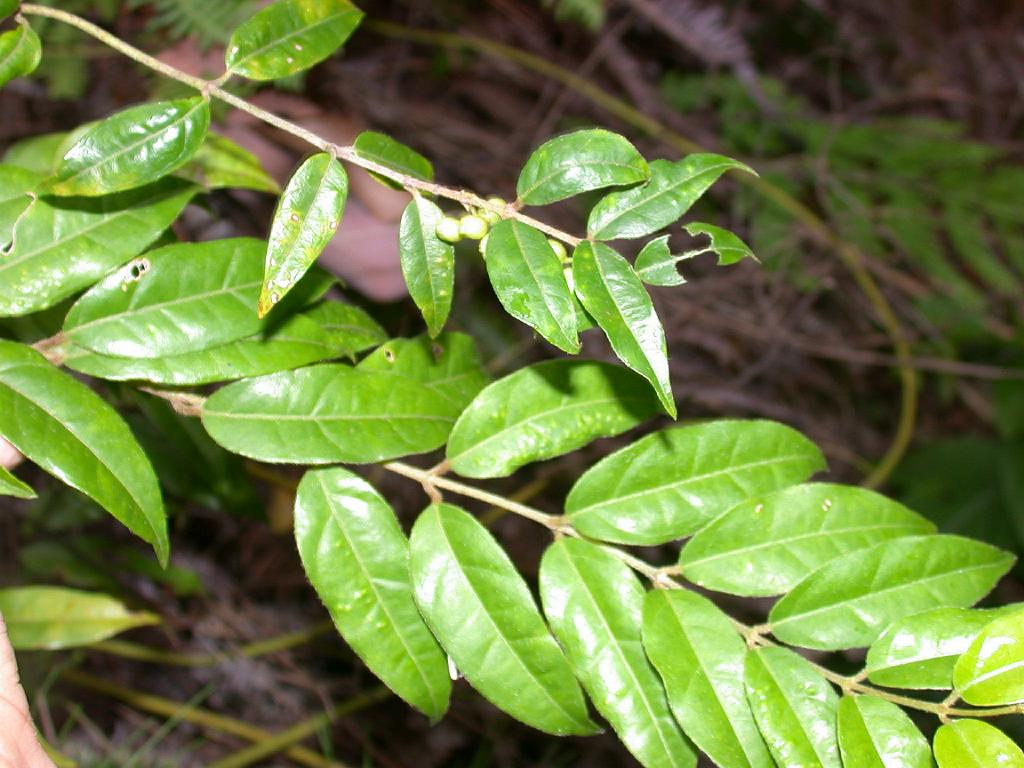
- Coptosapelta diffusa

Scientific classification
- Kingdom: Plantae
- Clade: Tracheophytes
- Clade: Angiosperms
- Clade: Eudicots
- Clade: Asterids
- Order: Gentianales
- Family: Rubiaceae
- Tribe: Coptosapelteae; Bremek. ex S.P.Darwin

Type genus
- Coptosapelta Korth.

Synonyms
- Acranthereae Bremek. ex S.P.Darwin

= Coptosapelteae =

Tribe of plants

Coptosapelteae is a tribe incertae sedis of flowering plants in the family Rubiaceae and contains about 55 species in 2 genera. Its representatives are found in tropical and subtropical Asia. This tribe has not been placed within as subfamily of Rubiaceae, but is sister to the rest of the family.

== Genera ==
Currently accepted names

- Acranthera Arn. ex Meisn. (39 sp)
- Coptosapelta Korth. (16 sp)

Synonyms:

- Androtropis R.Br. ex Wall. = Acranthera
- Gonyanera Korth. = Acranthera
- Psilobium Jack = Acranthera
- Thysanospermum Champ. ex Benth. = Coptosapelta
