= Acranthera grandiflora =

Scientific classification
- Kingdom: Plantae
- Clade: Tracheophytes
- Clade: Angiosperms
- Clade: Eudicots
- Clade: Asterids
- Order: Gentianales
- Family: Rubiaceae
- Genus: Acranthera
- Species: A. grandiflora

Binomial name
- Acranthera grandiflora Bedd.

Species of plant

Acranthera grandiflora is a perennial herb in the family Rubiaceae and Genus Acranthera from the wet tropical biome of Southwest India. Known for its showy, dark blue flowers, it grows up to 20 cm tall and has silky, hairy leaves. It is endemic to the Southern Western Ghats, growing at altitudes of 1000–1400 meters in evergreen forests, with flowering occurring from May to September.
