= Prismatomerideae =

Scientific classification
- Kingdom: Plantae
- Clade: Tracheophytes
- Clade: Angiosperms
- Clade: Eudicots
- Clade: Asterids
- Order: Gentianales
- Family: Rubiaceae
- Subfamily: Rubioideae
- Tribe: Prismatomerideae; Y.Z.Ruan

Tribus of angiosperms

Prismatomerideae is a tribe of flowering plants in the family Rubiaceae and contains 24 species in 3 genera. Its representatives are found in Indo-China and tropical Asia.

== Genera ==
Currently accepted names

- Prismatomeris Thwaites (17 sp)
- Rennellia Korth. (9 sp)

Synonyms

- Didymoecium Bremek. = Rennellia
- Gentingia J.T.Johanss. & K.M.Wong = Rennellia
- Motleyia J.T.Johanss. = Prismatomeris
- Tribrachya Korth. = Rennellia
- Zeuxanthe Ridl. = Prismatomeris
