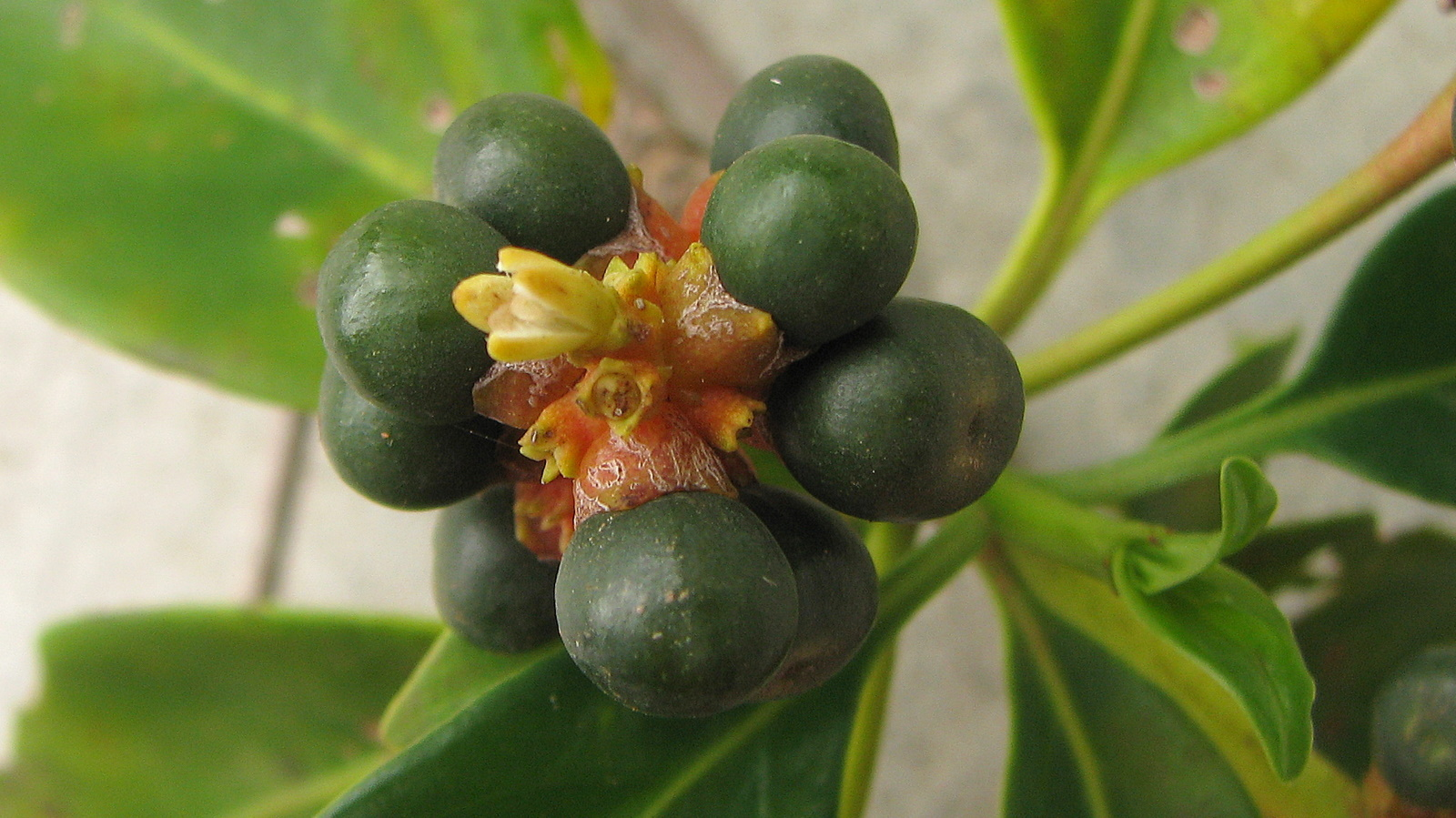
- Pagamea guianensis showing superior ovary

Scientific classification
- Kingdom: Plantae
- Clade: Tracheophytes
- Clade: Angiosperms
- Clade: Eudicots
- Clade: Asterids
- Order: Gentianales
- Family: Rubiaceae
- Subfamily: Rubioideae
- Tribe: Gaertnereae
- Genus: Pagamea; Aubl.

Species
- See text

= Pagamea =

Genus of Rubiaceae plants

Pagamea is a genus of flowering plants in the family Rubiaceae, native to northern South America. Shrubs or small trees, they are specialists in the Amazonian white-sand forests.

== Species ==
Currently accepted species include:

- Pagamea acrensis Steyerm.
- Pagamea anisophylla Standl. & Steyerm.
- Pagamea aracaensis B.M.Boom
- Pagamea capitata Benth.
- Pagamea coriacea Spruce ex Benth.
- Pagamea diceras Steyerm.
- Pagamea duckei Standl.
- Pagamea dudleyi Steyerm.
- Pagamea duidana Standl. & Steyerm.
- Pagamea guianensis Aubl.
- Pagamea harleyi Steyerm.
- Pagamea hirsuta Spruce ex Benth.
- Pagamea jauaensis Steyerm.
- Pagamea macrophylla Spruce ex Benth.
- Pagamea magniflora Steyerm.
- Pagamea montana Gleason & Standl.
- Pagamea pauciflora Standl. & Steyerm.
- Pagamea pilosa (Standl.) Steyerm.
- Pagamea plicata Spruce ex Benth.
- Pagamea plicatiformis Steyerm.
- Pagamea puberula Steyerm.
- Pagamea sessiliflora Spruce ex Benth.
- Pagamea spruceana Vicent. & E.M.B.Prata
- Pagamea standleyana Steyerm.
- Pagamea thyrsiflora Spruce ex Benth.
- Pagamea velutina Steyerm.
