= Clarkella =

Scientific classification
- Kingdom: Plantae
- Clade: Tracheophytes
- Clade: Angiosperms
- Clade: Eudicots
- Clade: Asterids
- Order: Gentianales
- Family: Rubiaceae
- Subfamily: Rubioideae
- Tribe: Clarkelleae
- Genus: Clarkella; Hook.f.
- Species: C. nana

Binomial name
- Clarkella nana (Edgew.) Hook.f.

Synonyms
- Clarkella nana var. siamensis (Craib) Fukuoka & N.Kurosaki; Clarkella siamensis Craib; Ophiorrhiza nana Edgew.; Ophiorrhiza pellucida H.Lév.

Genus of plants

Clarkella is a monotypic genus of flowering plants in the family Rubiaceae. The genus contains only one species, viz. Clarkella nana, which is native to India, China, Uttarakhand, the Western Himalayas, Burma and Thailand.
