= Schradera campii =

Conservation status
- Vulnerable (IUCN 3.1)

Scientific classification
- Kingdom: Plantae
- Clade: Tracheophytes
- Clade: Angiosperms
- Clade: Eudicots
- Clade: Asterids
- Order: Gentianales
- Family: Rubiaceae
- Genus: Schradera
- Species: S. campii

Binomial name
- Schradera campii Standl. ex Steyerm.

Species of plant

Schradera campii is a species of flowering plant in the family Rubiaceae. It is endemic to Ecuador.
