= Danaideae =

Scientific classification
- Kingdom: Plantae
- Clade: Tracheophytes
- Clade: Angiosperms
- Clade: Eudicots
- Clade: Asterids
- Order: Gentianales
- Family: Rubiaceae
- Subfamily: Rubioideae
- Tribe: Danaideae

Tribe of plants

Danaideae is a tribe of flowering plants in the family Rubiaceae and contains 67 species in 3 genera. Its representatives are found in Tanzania and several islands in the western Indian Ocean: Comoros, Mauritius, Madagascar, and Réunion.

== Genera ==
Currently accepted names

- Danais Comm. ex Vent. (37 spp)
- Payera Baill. (10 spp)
- Schismatoclada Baker (20 spp)

Synonyms

- Alleizettea Dubard & Dop = Danais
