= Foonchewia =

Scientific classification
- Kingdom: Plantae
- Clade: Tracheophytes
- Clade: Angiosperms
- Clade: Eudicots
- Clade: Asterids
- Order: Gentianales
- Family: Rubiaceae
- Subfamily: Rubioideae
- Tribe: Foonchewieae
- Genus: Foonchewia; R.J.Wang
- Species: F. coriacea

Binomial name
- Foonchewia coriacea (Dunn) Z.Q.Song

Synonyms
- Foonchewia guangdongensis R.J.Wang & H.Z.Wen

Genus of plants

Foonchewia is a monotypic genus of flowering plants in the Rubiaceae family, native to south-eastern China. The original type species, Foonchewia guangdongensis, was later replaced by the new combination Foonchewia coriacea.
