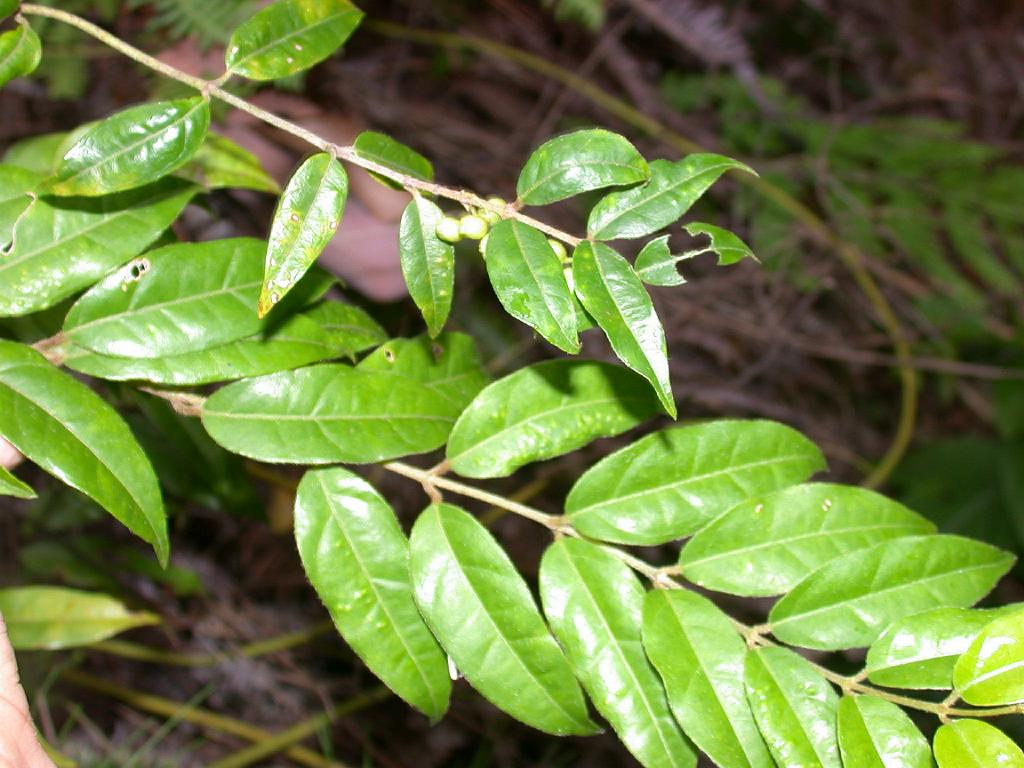
- Coptosapelta diffusa

Scientific classification
- Kingdom: Plantae
- Clade: Tracheophytes
- Clade: Angiosperms
- Clade: Eudicots
- Clade: Asterids
- Order: Gentianales
- Family: Rubiaceae
- Tribe: Coptosapelteae
- Genus: Coptosapelta; Korth.

Type species
- Coptosapelta flavescens Korth.

Synonyms
- Thysanospermum Champ. ex Benth.

= Coptosapelta =

Genus of plants

Coptosapelta is a genus of flowering plants in the family Rubiaceae. It is found in tropical and subtropical Asia. The genus has not been placed within a subfamily and is sister to the rest of Rubiaceae.

== Species ==
- Coptosapelta beccari Valeton
- Coptosapelta carrii Merr. & L.M.Perry
- Coptosapelta diffusa (Champ. ex Benth.) Steenis
- Coptosapelta flavescens Korth.
- Coptosapelta fuscescens Valeton
- Coptosapelta griffithii Hook.f.
- Coptosapelta hameliiblasta (Wernham) Valeton
- Coptosapelta hammii Valeton
- Coptosapelta janowskii Valeton
- Coptosapelta laotica Valeton
- Coptosapelta lutescens Valeton
- Coptosapelta maluensis Valeton
- Coptosapelta montana Korth. ex Valeton
- Coptosapelta olaciformis (Merr.) Elmer
- Coptosapelta parviflora Ridl.
- Coptosapelta valetonii Merr.
