= Rennellia subsessilis =

Conservation status
- Endangered (IUCN 3.1)

Scientific classification
- Kingdom: Plantae
- Clade: Tracheophytes
- Clade: Angiosperms
- Clade: Eudicots
- Clade: Asterids
- Order: Gentianales
- Family: Rubiaceae
- Genus: Rennellia
- Species: R. subsessilis

Binomial name
- Rennellia subsessilis (King & Gamble) Razafim. & Rydin (2020)

Synonyms
- Gentingia subsessilis (King & Gamble) J.T.Johanss. & K.M.Wong (1988); Prismatomeris subsessilis King & Gamble (1904)

Genus of plants

Rennellia subsessilis is species of flowering plant in the family Rubiaceae. It is a shrub or tree endemic to northwestern Peninsular Malaysia.
