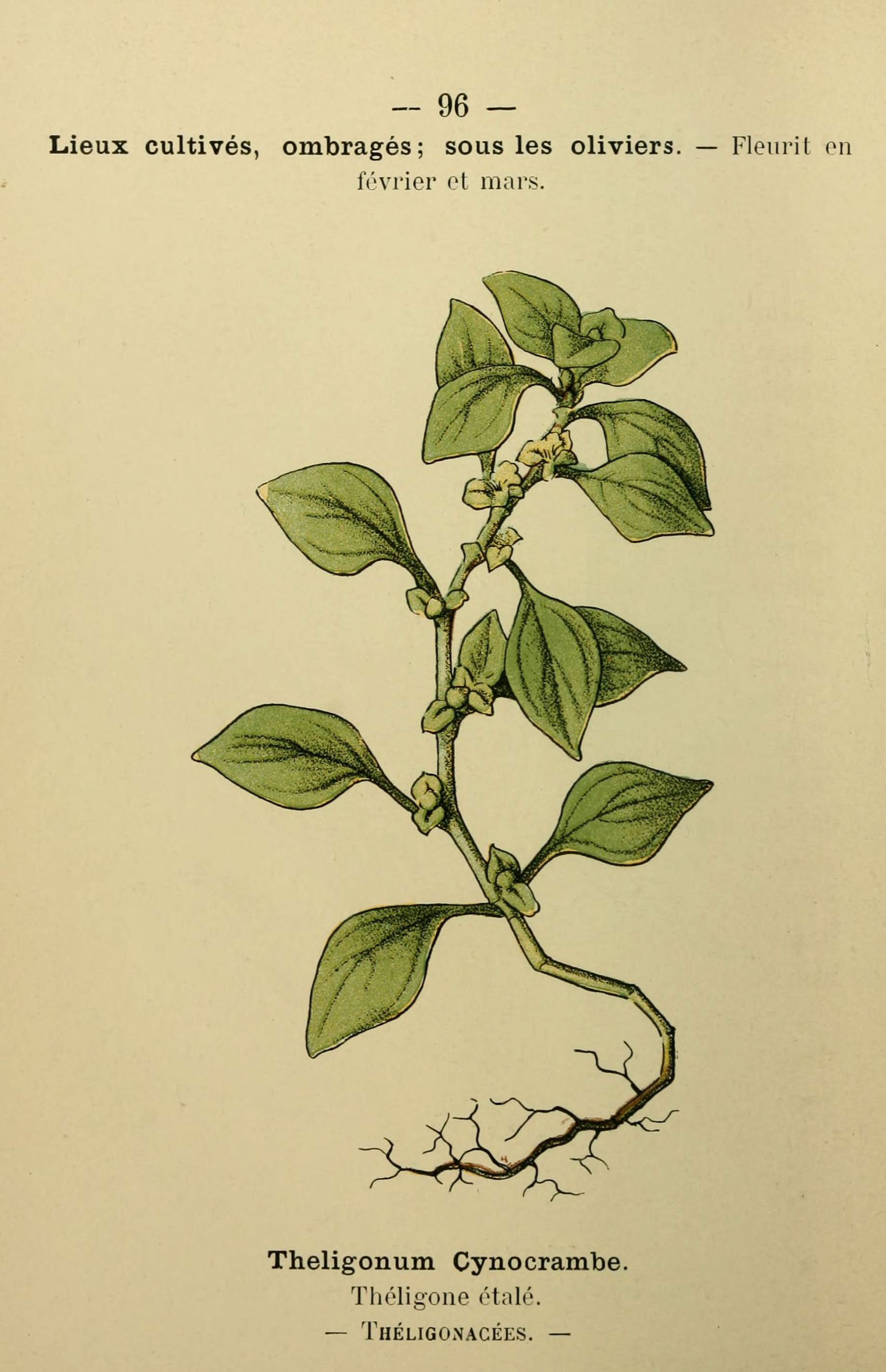

Scientific classification
- Kingdom: Plantae
- Clade: Embryophytes
- Clade: Tracheophytes
- Clade: Spermatophytes
- Clade: Angiosperms
- Clade: Eudicots
- Clade: Asterids
- Order: Gentianales
- Family: Rubiaceae
- Genus: Theligonum
- Species: T. cynocrambe

Binomial name
- Theligonum cynocrambe L.

= Theligonum cynocrambe =

Species of plant

Theligonum cynocrambe is a low to short prostrate or occasionally erect, usually hairless annual herb, leaves entire, ovate, untoothed. somewhat succulent, the lower are opposite and the upper alternate by the suppression of one leaf of each pair, there are peculiar united membranous stipules. Large club-shaped glands are present at the apex of the leaves, flowers insignificant with membranous perianth, 2–3 mm, green, unisexual with both sexes on the same plant, in one to three-flowered clusters. The male flowers have a valvate to globose perianth, splitting into two to five lobes when the flower opens. There are 7 up to 12 but sometimes as few as 2 and as many as 30 stamens with filiform filaments and anthers that are erect in the bud, but pendulous later, the female flowers have a tubular shortly toothed perianth and ovary of a single carpel containing a single basal ovule. The style is simple and arises from the base of the ovary. The ovary enlarges irregularly on one side and the style becomes lateral at fruiting time. The fruit is a subglobose nut-like drupe 2mm, containing one seed with a fleshy endosperm. It exhibits myrmecochory which is dispersal of seeds by the agency of ants. Ants feed on the oil body or elaiosome of various seeds and frequently carry the seed some distance from the parent plant. The oil body of the seed is formed of a portion of the pericarp which remains attached to the base of the seed. The ants eat the oil body and then leave the seed undamaged. Young shoots of T. Cynocrambe are sometimes eaten as a vegetable. Grows in rocky habitats, sandy ground, old walls, often in damp and shaded places. Flowers Feb-June.
