= Dunnia =

Scientific classification
- Kingdom: Plantae
- Clade: Tracheophytes
- Clade: Angiosperms
- Clade: Eudicots
- Clade: Asterids
- Order: Gentianales
- Family: Rubiaceae
- Subfamily: Rubioideae
- Tribe: Dunnieae
- Genus: Dunnia; Tutcher
- Species: D. sinensis

Binomial name
- Dunnia sinensis Tutcher

Genus of plants

Dunnia is a monotypic genus of flowering plants in the family Rubiaceae. The genus contains only one species, viz. Dunnia sinensis, which is endemic to Guangdong. The Dunnia's survival is threatened due to the presence of humans. Humans' have populated and exploited their natural habitats, along streams and hillsides at low altitudes, to the point of only five isolated habitats being all that's left.
