= Rennellia =

Scientific classification
- Kingdom: Plantae
- Clade: Tracheophytes
- Clade: Angiosperms
- Clade: Eudicots
- Clade: Asterids
- Order: Gentianales
- Family: Rubiaceae
- Genus: Rennellia; Korth.

Synonyms
- Didymoecium Bremek. (1935); Gentingia J.T.Johanss. & K.M.Wong (1988); Tribrachya Korth. (1851)

Genus of plants

Rennellia is a genus of flowering plants belonging to the family Rubiaceae.

Its native range is Indo-China to western Malesia. It is found in Borneo, Malaya, Myanmar, the Nicobar Islands, Sumatera and Thailand.

The genus name of Rennellia is in honour of James Rennell (1742–1830), an English geographer, historian and a pioneer of oceanography. It was first described and published in Ned. Kruidk. Arch. Vol.2 (Issue 2) on page 255 in 1851.

== Known species ==
According to Kew:

- Rennellia amoena (Bremek.) J.T.Johanss.
- Rennellia borneensis Baill.
- Rennellia condensa (K.M.Wong) Razafim. & Rydin
- Rennellia elliptica Korth.
- Rennellia elongata (King & Gamble) Ridl.
- Rennellia morindiformis (Korth.) Ridl.
- Rennellia paniculata King & Gamble
- Rennellia subsessilis (King & Gamble) Razafim. & Rydin
- Rennellia wallichii (Kurz) I.M.Turner
