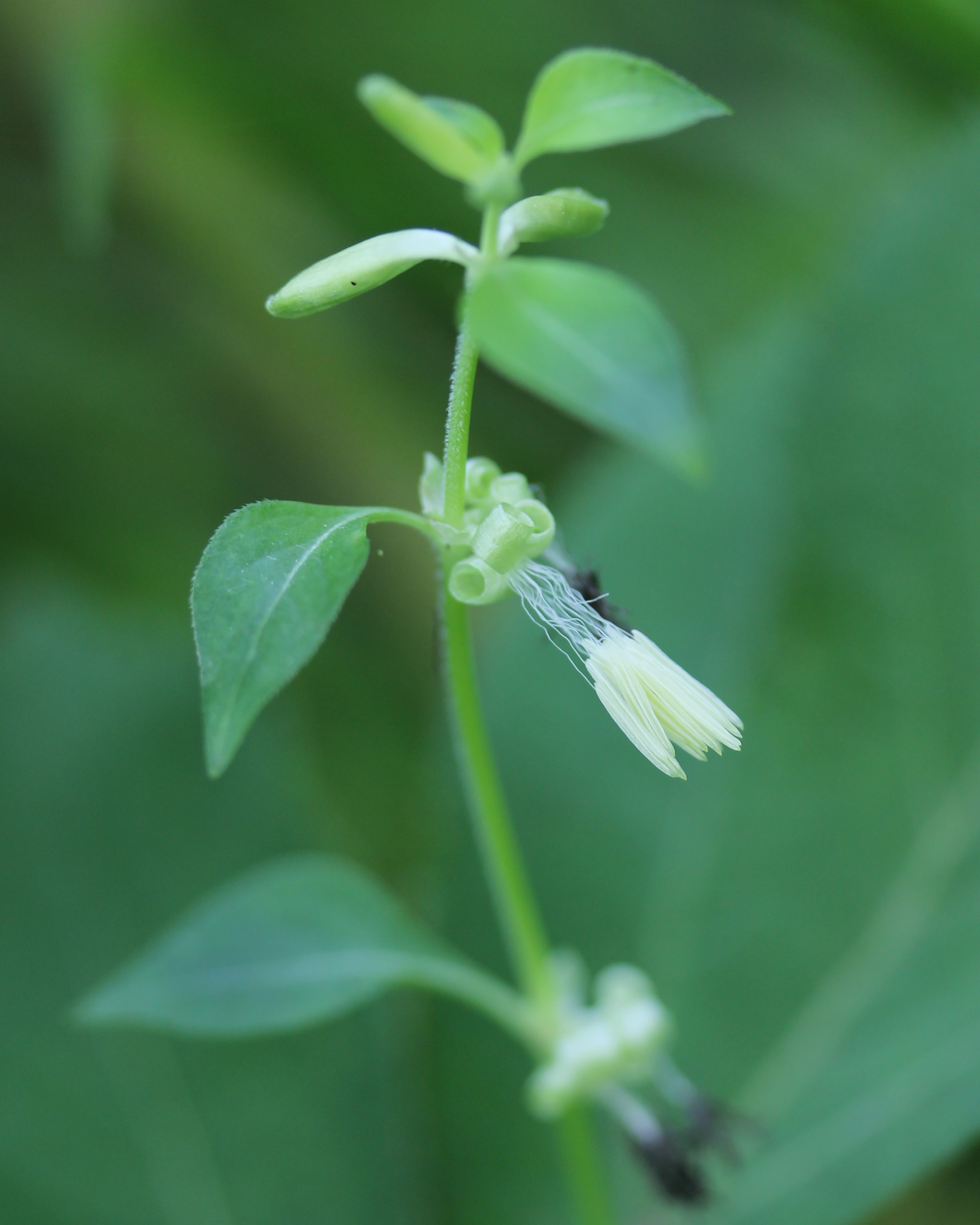
- Theligonum japonicum

Scientific classification
- Kingdom: Plantae
- Clade: Tracheophytes
- Clade: Angiosperms
- Clade: Eudicots
- Clade: Asterids
- Order: Gentianales
- Family: Rubiaceae
- Subfamily: Rubioideae
- Tribe: Theligoneae
- Genus: Theligonum; L.

Type species
- Theligonum cynocrambe L.

Synonyms
- Cynocrambe Gagnebin

= Theligonum =

Genus of plants

Theligonum is a genus of flowering plants in the family Rubiaceae. It was described by Carl Linnaeus in 1753. The genus is found from Macaronesia to the Mediterranean Basin, and from China to temperate eastern Asia. It is the only genus in the tribe Theligoneae.

== Species ==
- Theligonum cynocrambe L.
- Theligonum formosanum (Ohwi) Ohwi
- Theligonum japonicum Ôkubo & Makino
- Theligonum macranthum Franch.
