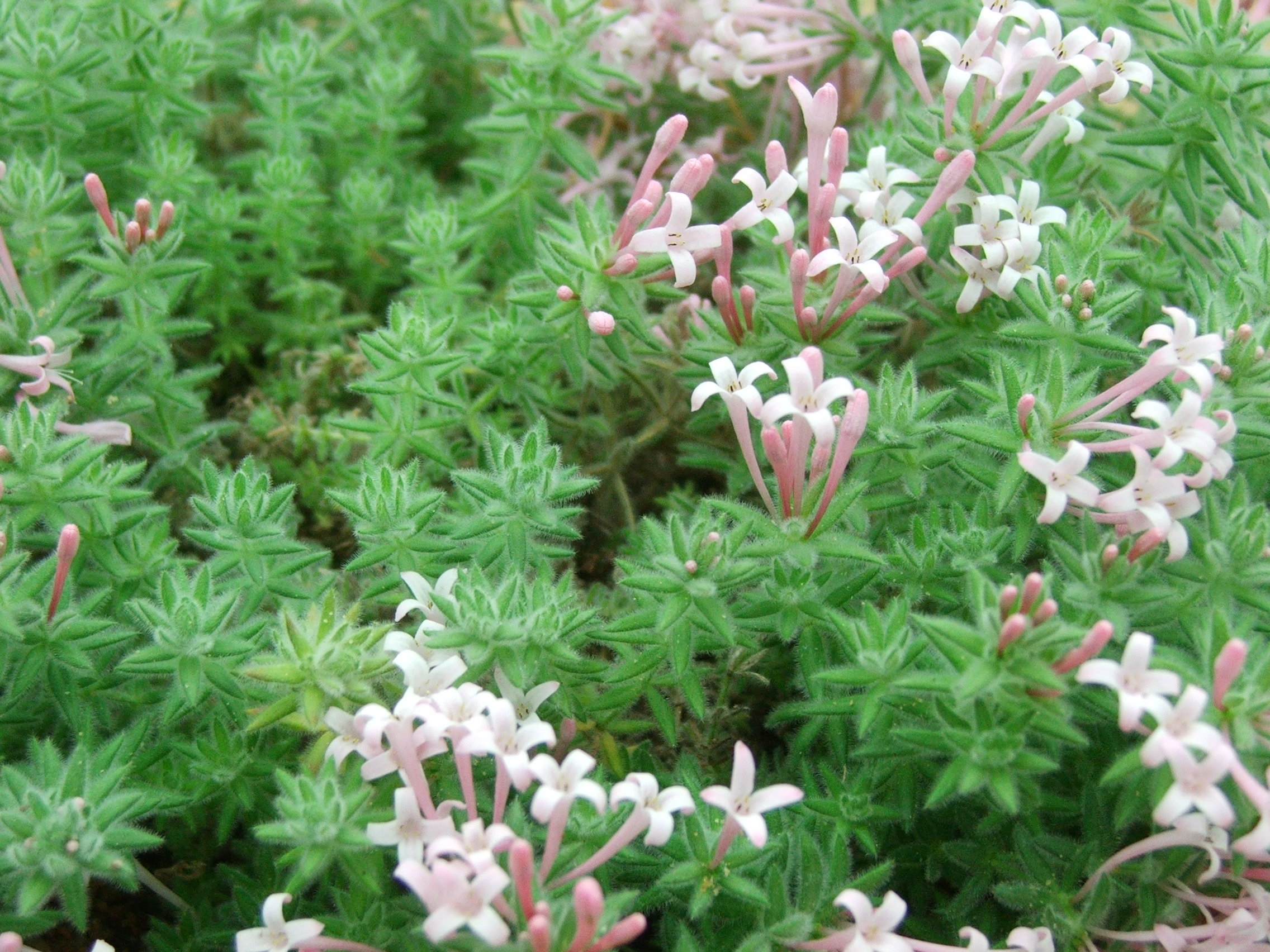
- Flowers in the family Rubiaceae

Scientific classification
- Kingdom: Plantae
- Clade: Tracheophytes
- Clade: Angiosperms
- Clade: Eudicots
- Clade: Asterids
- Order: Gentianales
- Family: Rubiaceae
- Genus: Payera; Baill.

Type species
- Payera conspicua Baill.

Synonyms
- Coursiana Homolle

= Payera =

Genus of plants

Payera is a genus of flowering plants in the family Rubiaceae. It was described by Henri Ernest Baillon in 1878. The genus is endemic to Madagascar.

== Species ==
- Payera bakeriana (Homolle) Buchner & Puff
- Payera beondrokensis (Humbert) Buchner & Puff
- Payera conspicua Baill.
- Payera coriacea (Humbert) Buchner & Puff
- Payera decaryi (Homolle) Buchner & Puff
- Payera glabrifolia J.-F.Leroy ex Buchner & Puff
- Payera homolleana (Cavaco) Buchner & Puff
- Payera madagascariensis (Cavaco) Buchner & Puff
- Payera mandrarensis (Homolle ex Cavaco) Buchner & Puff
- Payera marojejyensis Buchner & Puff
