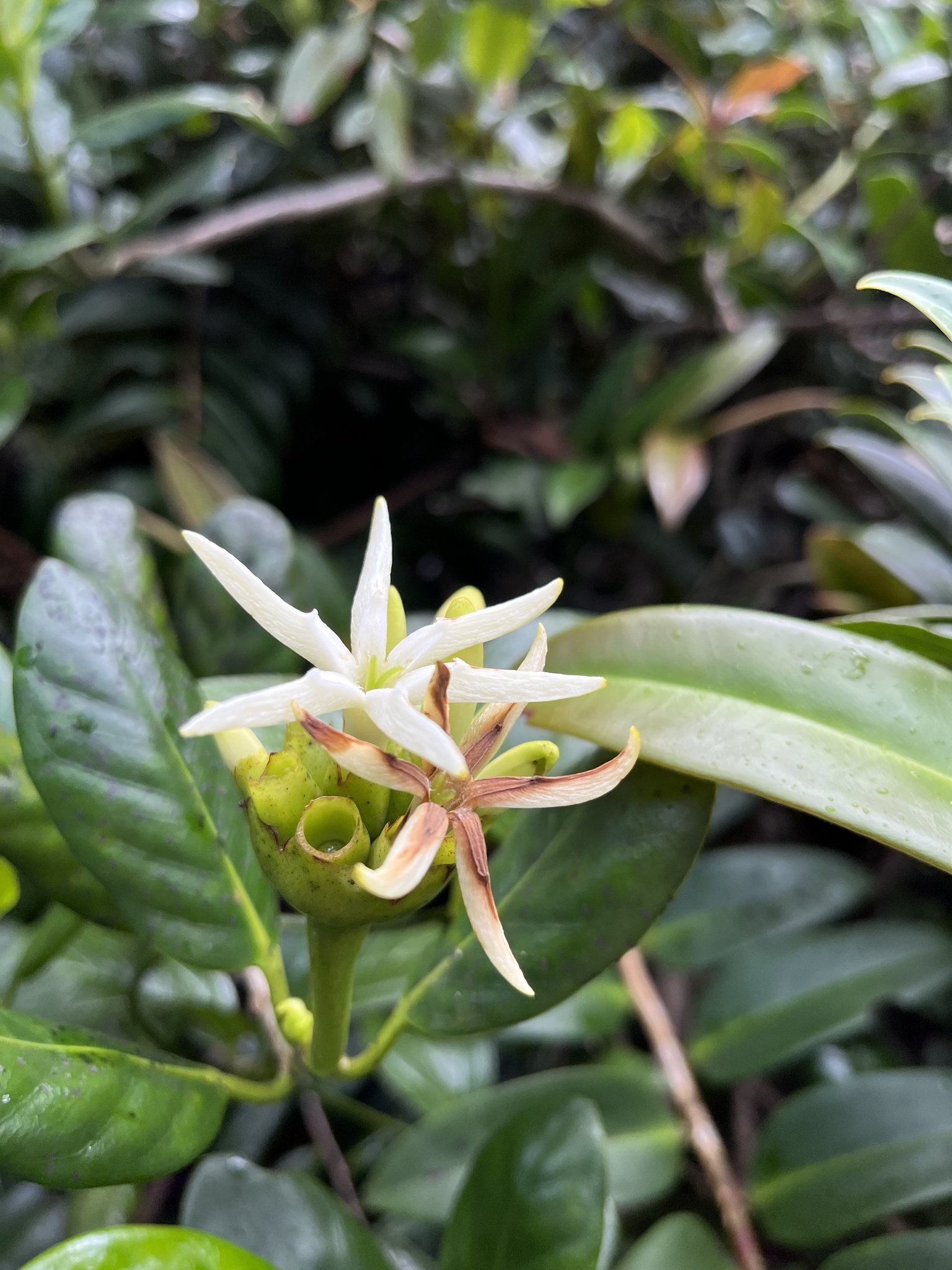
- Schradera exotica in Puerto Rico

Scientific classification
- Kingdom: Plantae
- Clade: Embryophytes
- Clade: Tracheophytes
- Clade: Angiosperms
- Clade: Eudicots
- Clade: Asterids
- Order: Gentianales
- Family: Rubiaceae
- Subfamily: Rubioideae
- Tribe: Schradereae
- Genus: Schradera; Vahl

Synonyms
- Fuchsia Sw.; Lucinaea DC.; Uncariopsis H.Karst.; Urceolaria Willd. ex Cothen.

= Schradera =

Genus of flowering plants

Schradera is a genus of flowering plants in the family Rubiaceae. It was described by Martin Vahl in 1797. The genus has a wide distribution area and is found from tropical America to the Malay Archipelago. It is the only genus in the tribe Schradereae.

== Species ==
- Schradera acuminata Standl.
- Schradera acutifolia (Valeton) Puff
- Schradera andina Steyerm.
- Schradera bipedunculata Steyerm.
- Schradera blumii Dwyer & M.V.Hayden
- Schradera brevipes Steyerm.
- Schradera cacuminis Standl.
- Schradera campii Standl. ex Steyerm.
- Schradera cephalophora Griseb.
- Schradera clusiifolia (Britton & Standl.) R.O.Williams
- Schradera condorica
- Schradera costaricensis Dwyer
- Schradera cuatrecasasii Standl. ex Steyerm.
- Schradera cubensis Steyerm.
- Schradera elmeri Puff
- Schradera exotica (J.F.Gmel.) Standl.
- Schradera glabriflora Steyerm.
- Schradera grandiflora Puff
- Schradera hilliifolia Steyerm.
- Schradera involucrata (Sw.) K.Schum.
- Schradera korthalsiana (Miq.) Puff
- Schradera ledermannii (Valeton) Puff
- Schradera lehmannii Standl.
- Schradera luxurians Standl. ex Steyerm.
- Schradera maguirei Steyerm.
- Schradera marahuacensis Steyerm.
- Schradera marginalis Standl.
- Schradera membranacea (King) Puff
- Schradera monantha (Merr. & L.M.Perry) Puff
- Schradera monocephala (Merr.) Puff
- Schradera montana (Korth.) Puff
- Schradera neeoides Standl. ex Steyerm.
- Schradera negrensis Suess.
- Schradera nervulosa (Stapf) Puff
- Schradera nilssonii Steyerm.
- Schradera novoguineensis (Valeton) Puff
- Schradera obtusifolia C.M.Taylor
- Schradera pentacme (Stapf) Puff
- Schradera polycephala DC.
- Schradera polysperma (Jack) Puff
- Schradera pseudonervulosa Puff
- Schradera puberula Steyerm.
- Schradera pulverulenta Steyerm.
- Schradera ramiflora (Valeton) Puff
- Schradera reticulata J.Sanchez-Gonz.
- Schradera revoluta Standl.
- Schradera rotundata Standl. ex Steyerm.
- Schradera schlechteri (Valeton) Puff
- Schradera stellata Benth.
- Schradera suaveolens (H.Karst.) Steyerm.
- Schradera subandina K.Krause
- Schradera subsessilis Steyerm.
- Schradera surinamensis Standl.
- Schradera ternata Steyerm.
- Schradera umbellata C.Presl
- Schradera yutajensis Steyerm.
