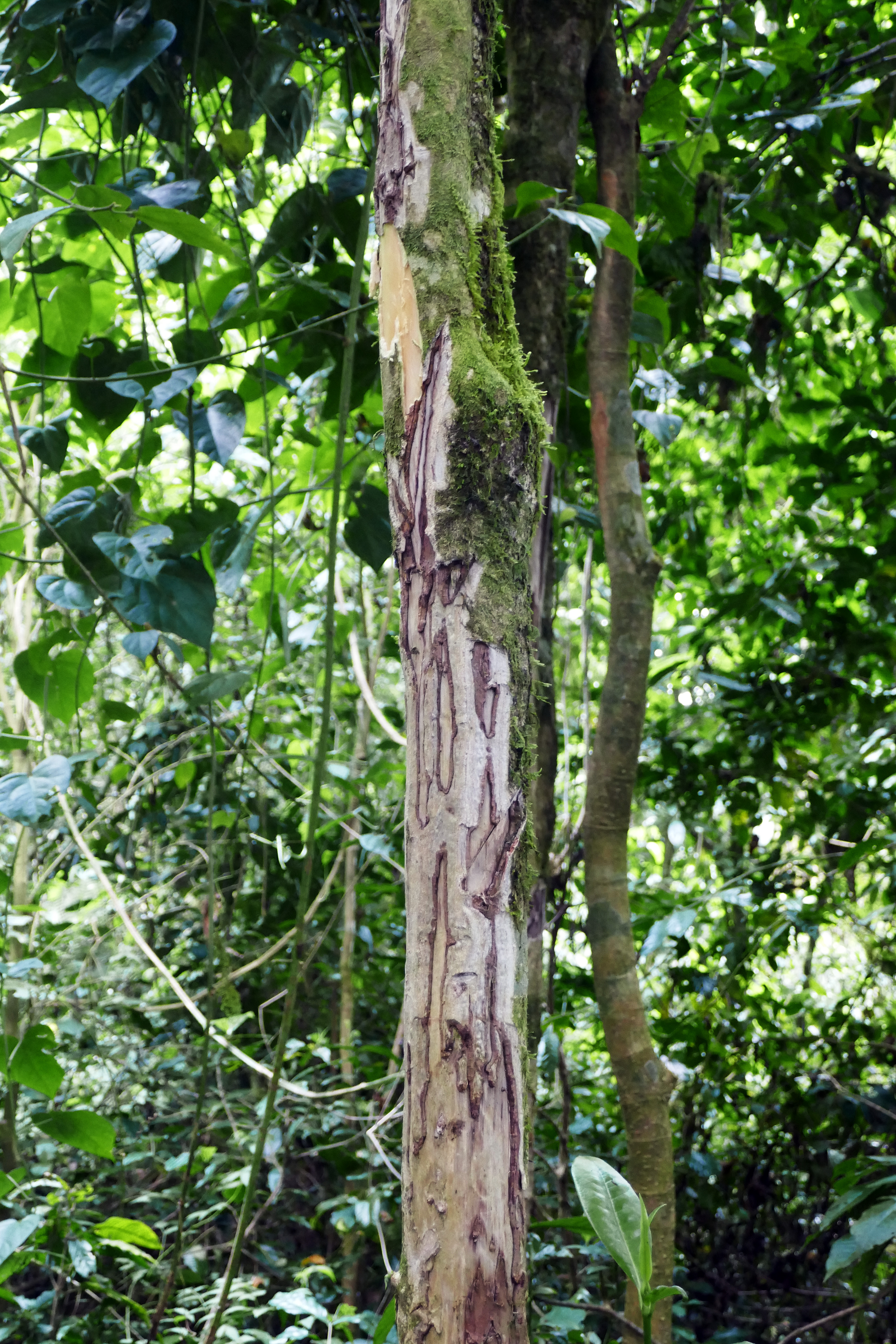
- Craterispermum montanum in São Tomé

Scientific classification
- Kingdom: Plantae
- Clade: Tracheophytes
- Clade: Angiosperms
- Clade: Eudicots
- Clade: Asterids
- Order: Gentianales
- Family: Rubiaceae
- Subfamily: Rubioideae
- Tribe: Craterispermeae; Verdc.
- Genus: Craterispermum; Benth.

Type species
- Craterispermum laurinum (Poir.) Benth.

= Craterispermum =

Genus of flowering plants

Craterispermum is a genus of flowering plants in the family Rubiaceae. It contains 16 species that occur in tropical Africa and Seychelles. It is the only genus in the tribe Craterispermeae, of which the divergence time is estimated at 34.8 million years ago.

== Species ==
The following species are recognized as of May 2014:

- Craterispermum angustifolium De Wild. & T.Durand - Zaïre (Congo-Kinshasa, Democratic Republic of the Congo)
- Craterispermum aristatum Wernham - Nigeria, Cameroon
- Craterispermum caudatum Hutch. -Ghana, Côte d'Ivoire, Liberia, Nigeria, Senegal, Sierra Leone, Gabon, Cameroon
- Craterispermum cerinanthum Hiern - Benin, Ghana, Côte d'Ivoire, Nigeria, Togo, Central African Republic, Cameroon, Congo-Brazzaville, Gabon, Zaire, Angola
- Craterispermum congolanum De Wild. & T.Durand - Zaïre (Congo-Kinshasa, Democratic Republic of the Congo)
- Craterispermum dewevrei De Wild. & T.Durand - Gabon, Zaïre (Congo-Kinshasa, Democratic Republic of the Congo)
- Craterispermum goossensii De Wild. - Zaïre (Congo-Kinshasa, Democratic Republic of the Congo)
- Craterispermum grumileoides K.Schum. - Angola
- Craterispermum inquisitorium Wernham - Gabon, Cabinda, Zaïre (Congo-Kinshasa, Democratic Republic of the Congo)
- Craterispermum laurinum (Poir.) Benth. - Gambia, Ghana, Guinea-Bissau, Guinea, Côte d'Ivoire, Mali, Nigeria, Senegal, Sierra Leone, Central African Republic, Congo-Brazzaville, Gabon
- Craterispermum ledermannii K.Krause - Cameroon, Gabon, Equatorial Guinea
- Craterispermum longipedunculatum Verdc. - Tanzania
- Craterispermum microdon Baker - Seychelles
- Craterispermum montanum Hiern - Gulf of Guinea Islands
- Craterispermum parvifolium Taedoumg & Sonké - Cameroon, Gabon, Equatorial Guinea
- Craterispermum reticulatum De Wild. - Zaïre (Congo-Kinshasa, Democratic Republic of the Congo)
- Craterispermum robbrechtianum Taedoumg & Sonké - Cameroon, Gabon
- Craterispermum schweinfurthii Hiern - Nigeria, Burundi, Central African Republic, Gabon, Zaïre (Congo-Kinshasa, Democratic Republic of the Congo), Ethiopia, Sudan, Kenya, Tanzania, Uganda, Angola, Malawi, Mozambique, Zambia, Zimbabwe
