= Schizocolea =

Scientific classification
- Kingdom: Plantae
- Clade: Tracheophytes
- Clade: Angiosperms
- Clade: Eudicots
- Clade: Asterids
- Order: Gentianales
- Family: Rubiaceae
- Subfamily: Rubioideae
- Tribe: Schizocoleeae
- Genus: Schizocolea; Bremek.

Type species
- Schizocolea linderi (Hutch. & Dalziel) Bremek.

Genus of plants

Schizocolea is a genus of flowering plants in the family Rubiaceae. It is the only genus in the tribe Schizocoleeae. The genus is found in Guinea, Ivory Coast, Liberia, Sierra Leone, Gabon, the Democratic Republic of the Congo, and Angola.

== Species ==
- Schizocolea linderi (Hutch. & Dalziel) Bremek.
- Schizocolea ochreata E.M.A.Petit
