= Cyanoneuron =

Scientific classification
- Kingdom: Plantae
- Clade: Tracheophytes
- Clade: Angiosperms
- Clade: Eudicots
- Clade: Asterids
- Order: Gentianales
- Family: Rubiaceae
- Subfamily: Rubioideae
- Tribe: Cyanoneuroneae; Razafim. & B.Bremer
- Genus: Cyanoneuron; Tange

Genus of plants

Cyanoneuron is a genus of flowering plants in the family Rubiaceae. The genus is found on Borneo and Sulawesi.

== Species ==
- Cyanoneuron cyaneum (Hallier f.) Tange - Borneo, Sulawesi
- Cyanoneuron depauperatum (Merr.) Tange - Borneo
- Cyanoneuron grandiflorum Tange - Sarawak
- Cyanoneuron pedunculatum Tange - Sarawak
- Cyanoneuron pubescens (Valeton) Tange - Borneo
