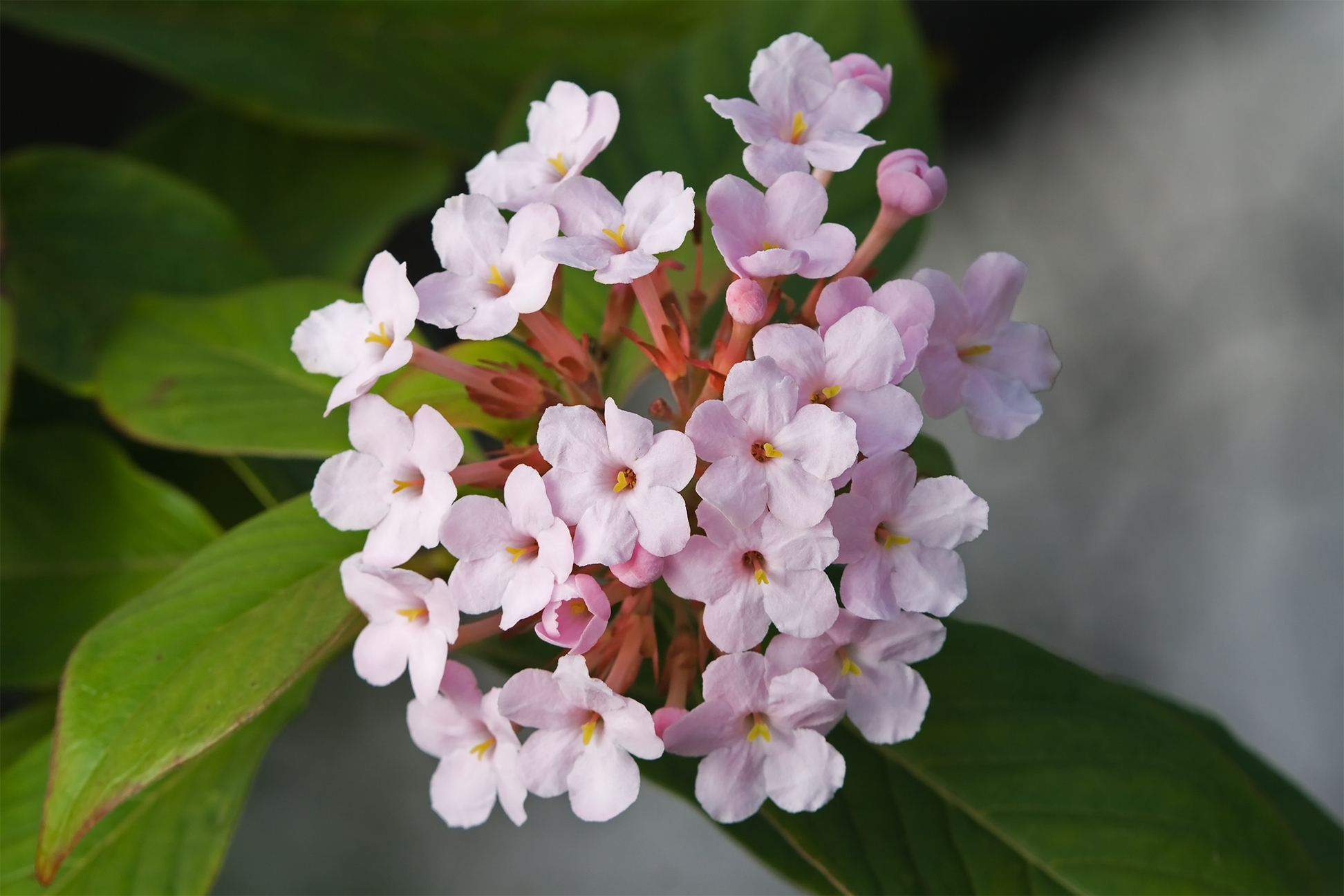
- Luculia gratissima

Scientific classification
- Kingdom: Plantae
- Clade: Tracheophytes
- Clade: Angiosperms
- Clade: Eudicots
- Clade: Asterids
- Order: Gentianales
- Family: Rubiaceae
- Tribe: Luculieae; Rydin & B.Bremer
- Genus: Luculia; Sweet

Type species
- Luculia gratissima Sweet

= Luculia =

Genus of plants

Luculia is a genus of flowering plants in the family Rubiaceae. It was described by Robert Sweet in 1826 and is currently found from the Himalayas to southern China. The species are shrubs or small trees, generally found on upland scrub and woodland or forest margins. They have large leaves from 20 to 35 cm with prominent veins carried in opposite pairs. The inflorescence is a terminal umbel or corymb of tubular/open ended white, pink or creamy flowers with 5 spreading petals. It may be from 10 to 20 cm, depending on the species.

== Species ==
Image	Scientific name	Distribution
	Luculia grandifolia Ghose	Bhutan, NE India
	Luculia gratissima (Wall.) Sweet	China (Xizang, Yunnan), Bhutan, NE India, Myanmar, Nepal, Thailand, Vietnam
	Luculia pinceana Hook.	China (Guangxi, Guizhou, Xizang, Yunnan), India, Myanmar, Nepal, Vietnam
	Luculia yunnanensis S.Y.Hu	Yunnan.
