= Seychellea =

Conservation status
- Critically Endangered (IUCN 3.1)

Scientific classification
- Kingdom: Plantae
- Clade: Tracheophytes
- Clade: Angiosperms
- Clade: Eudicots
- Clade: Asterids
- Order: Gentianales
- Family: Rubiaceae
- Subfamily: Rubioideae
- Tribe: Seychelleeae
- Genus: Seychellea; Razafim., Kainul. & Rydin (2019)
- Species: S. sechellarum

Binomial name
- Seychellea sechellarum (Baker) Razafim., Kainul. & Rydin (2019)

Synonyms
- Nonatelia sechellarum (Baker) Kuntze (1891); Psathura sechellarum Baker (1877); Psychotria sechellarum (Baker) Summerh. (1928)

Genus of plants

Seychellea sechellarum is a species of flowering plant in the family Rubiaceae. It is a shrub endemic to the Seychelles. It is the sole species in genus Seychellea.

The species is endemic to the islands of Mahé and Silhouette, two of the Granitic Seychelles. It is an understory shrub or small tree which grows in humid montane forest from 500 to 830 meters elevation.

The wild population is small in number and range. Fewer than 50 mature individuals are known from Mahé, and only one mature individual from Silhouette. The estimated extent of occurrence (EOO) on Mahé is 13 km^{2}, and the EOO on Silhouette has not been determined. The plant was reported as common in Mahé's humid montane forests in the late 19th century, but has declined in both range and population since. No reproduction of the plant has been observed in the wild, and only one young specimen is known from Mahé. The species is assessed as Critically Endangered.

The species was first named Psathura sechellarum in 1877. It was renamed Seychellea sechellarum in 2019, and placed in its own genus. The genus is the sole member of tribe Seychelleeae, which is most closely related to tribe Colletoecemateae containing the central African genus Colletoecema.
