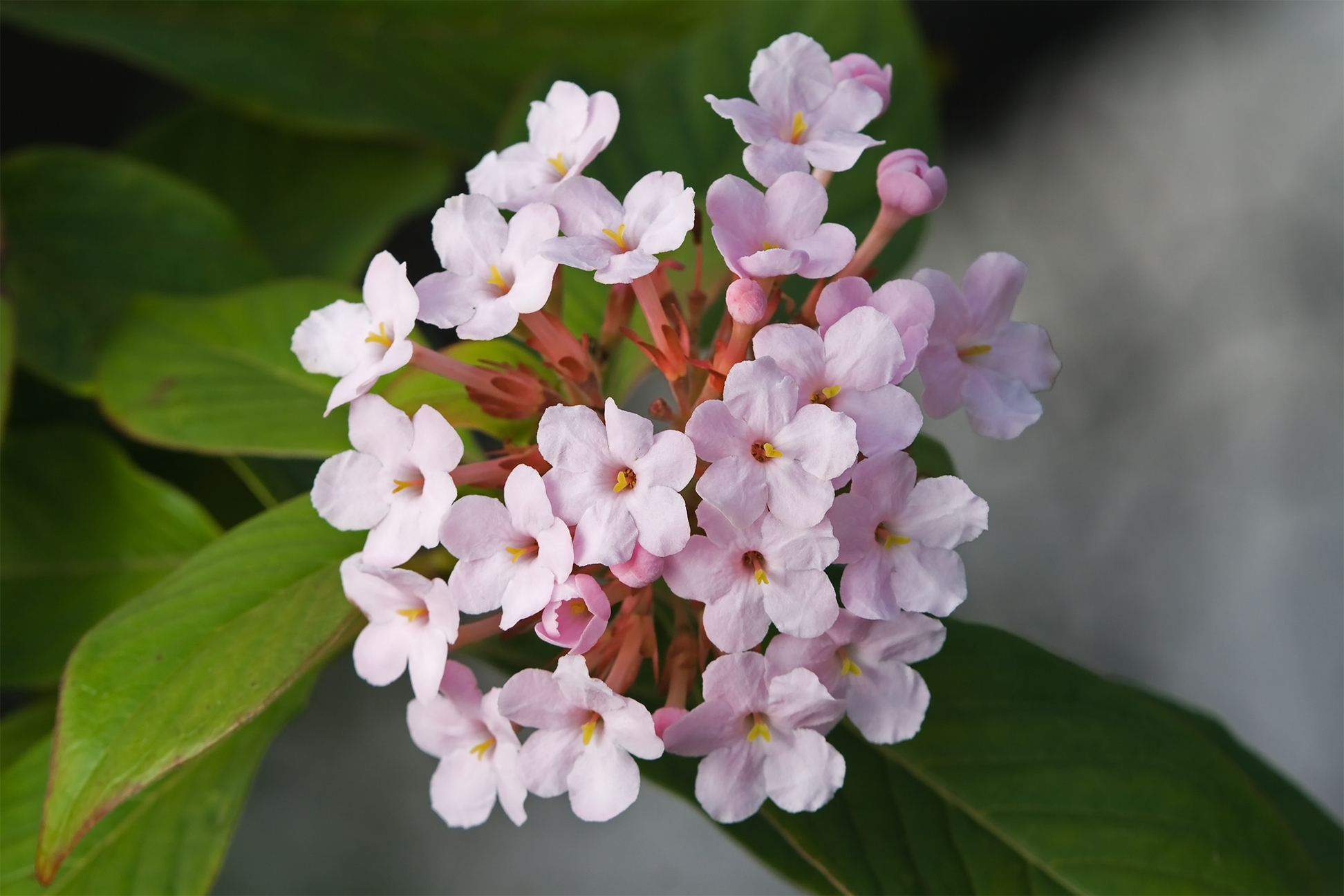

Conservation status
- Least Concern (IUCN 3.1)

Scientific classification
- Kingdom: Plantae
- Clade: Embryophytes
- Clade: Tracheophytes
- Clade: Spermatophytes
- Clade: Angiosperms
- Clade: Eudicots
- Clade: Asterids
- Order: Gentianales
- Family: Rubiaceae
- Genus: Luculia
- Species: L. gratissima

Binomial name
- Luculia gratissima (Wall.) Sweet

Synonyms
- Cinchona gratissima Wall.; Mussaenda luculia Buch.-Ham. ex D.Don

= Luculia gratissima =

Species of plant

Luculia gratissima is a species of flowering plant in the family Rubiaceae. It is an ornamental plant that is found from the central Himalayas to northern Indo-China.

The Latin specific epithet gratissima means "most pleasing" or "most agreeable".

It is a large shrub or even a small tree growing to 4 m (13 ft) tall by 1.5 m (4.9 ft) broad, with pointed ribbed leaves, and clustered fragrant pale pink flowers in autumn and winter. As it does not tolerate temperatures below 5 °C (41 °F), it requires cultivation under glass in temperate zones. However, it may be placed outside in a sheltered, sunny spot during the summer months. It is a recipient of the Royal Horticultural Society's Award of Garden Merit.
