= Gaertnereae =

Scientific classification
- Kingdom: Plantae
- Clade: Tracheophytes
- Clade: Angiosperms
- Clade: Eudicots
- Clade: Asterids
- Order: Gentianales
- Family: Rubiaceae
- Subfamily: Rubioideae
- Tribe: Gaertnereae; Bremek. ex S.P.Darwin

Type genus
- Gaertnera Lam.

Tribe of plants

Gaertnereae is a tribe of flowering plants in the family Rubiaceae and contains about 95 species in 2 genera. Gaertnera is found from tropical Africa to tropical Asia, while Pagamea is found in southern tropical America.

== Genera ==
Currently accepted names

- Gaertnera Lam. (70 sp)
- Pagamea Aubl. (25 sp)

Synonyms

- Andersonia Willd. ex Schult. = Gaertnera
- Fructesca DC. ex Meisn. = Gaertnera
- Hymenocnemis Hook.f. = Gaertnera
- Pristidia Thwaites = Gaertnera
- Sykesia Arn. = Gaertnera
