= Colletoecema =

Scientific classification
- Kingdom: Plantae
- Clade: Tracheophytes
- Clade: Angiosperms
- Clade: Eudicots
- Clade: Asterids
- Order: Gentianales
- Family: Rubiaceae
- Subfamily: Rubioideae
- Tribe: Colletoecemateae; Rydin & B.Bremer
- Genus: Colletoecema; E.M.A.Petit

Type species
- Colletoecema dewevrei (De Wild.) E.M.A.Petit

Genus of plants

Colletoecema is a genus of flowering plants in the family Rubiaceae. It is the only genus in the tribe Colletoecemateae. The 3 species are found from west-central tropical Africa to Angola.

== Species ==
- Colletoecema dewevrei (De Wild.) E.M.A.Petit - Central African Republic, Cameroon, Congo, Gabon, D.R.Congo, Angola
- Colletoecema gabonensis Dessein & O.Lachenaud - Gabon
- Colletoecema magna Sonké & Dessein - Cameroon
