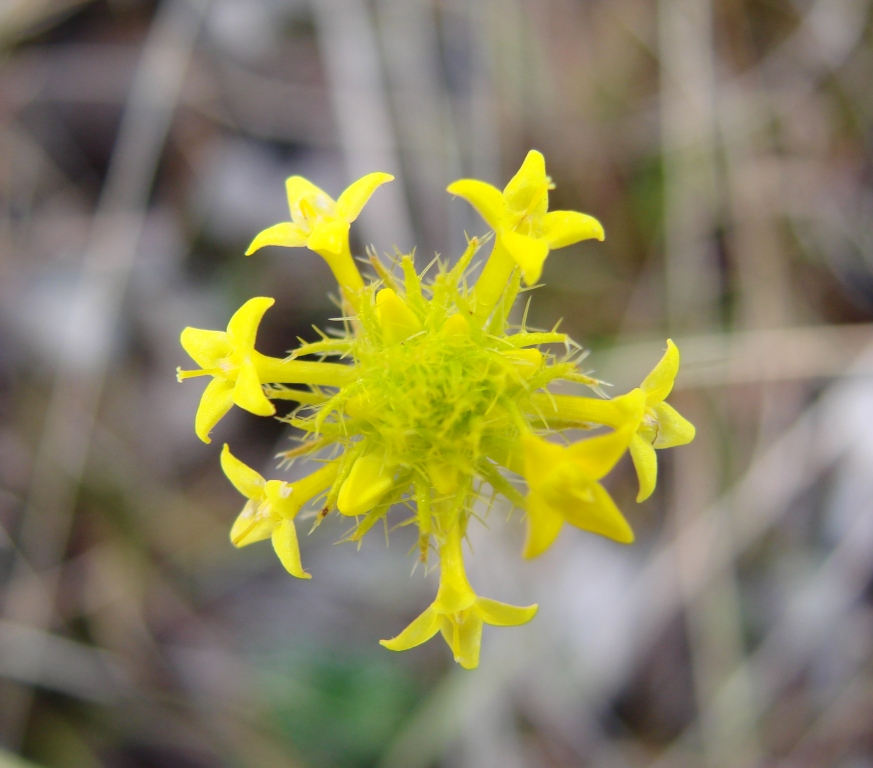

Scientific classification
- Kingdom: Plantae
- Clade: Tracheophytes
- Clade: Angiosperms
- Clade: Eudicots
- Clade: Asterids
- Order: Gentianales
- Family: Rubiaceae
- Subfamily: Rubioideae
- Tribe: Perameae
- Genus: Perama; Aubl.

Type species
- Perama hirsuta Aubl.

Synonyms
- Mattuschkaea Schreb.; Mattuschkea Batsch; Buchia Kunth

= Perama (plant) =

Genus of plants

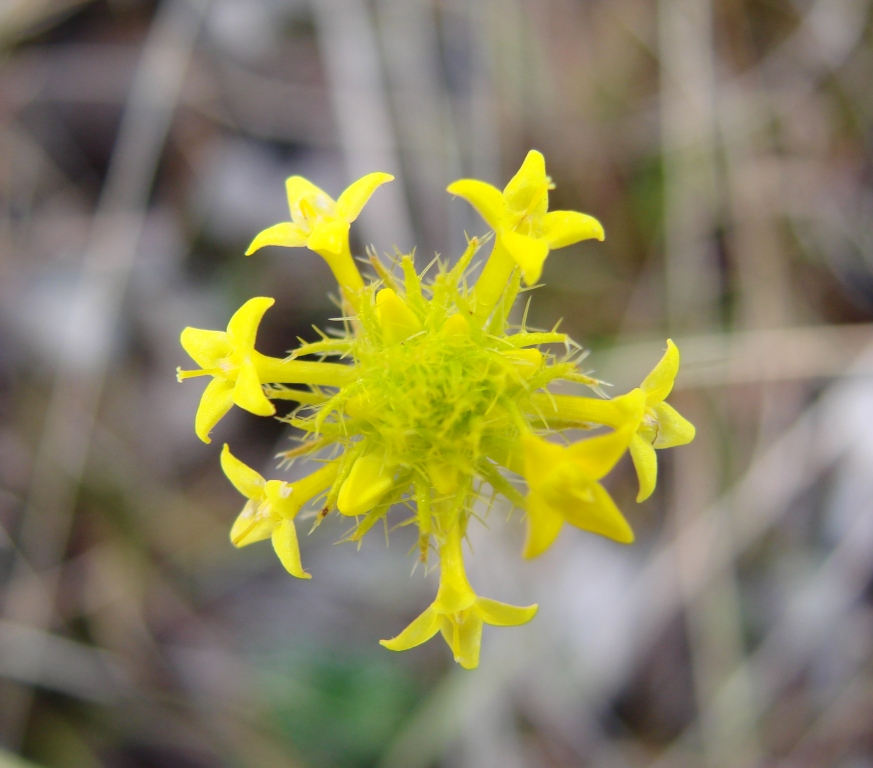
Perama hirsuta - RUBIACEAE

Perama is a genus of flowering plants in the family Rubiaceae. The genus is found in the Caribbean and southern tropical America.

== Species ==
- Perama carajensis J.H.Kirkbr.
- Perama dichotoma Poepp.
- Perama galioides (Kunth) Poir.
- Perama harleyi J.H.Kirkbr.
- Perama hirsuta Aubl.
- Perama holosericea (Naudin) Wurdack & Steyerm.
- Perama humilis Benth.
- Perama irwiniana J.H.Kirkbr.
- Perama mexiae Standl. ex Steyerm.
- Perama parviflora (Standl.) J.H.Kirkbr.
- Perama plantaginea (Kunth) Hook.f.
- Perama schultesii Steyerm.
- Perama sparsiflora Standl. ex Steyerm.
- Perama wurdackii Steyerm.
