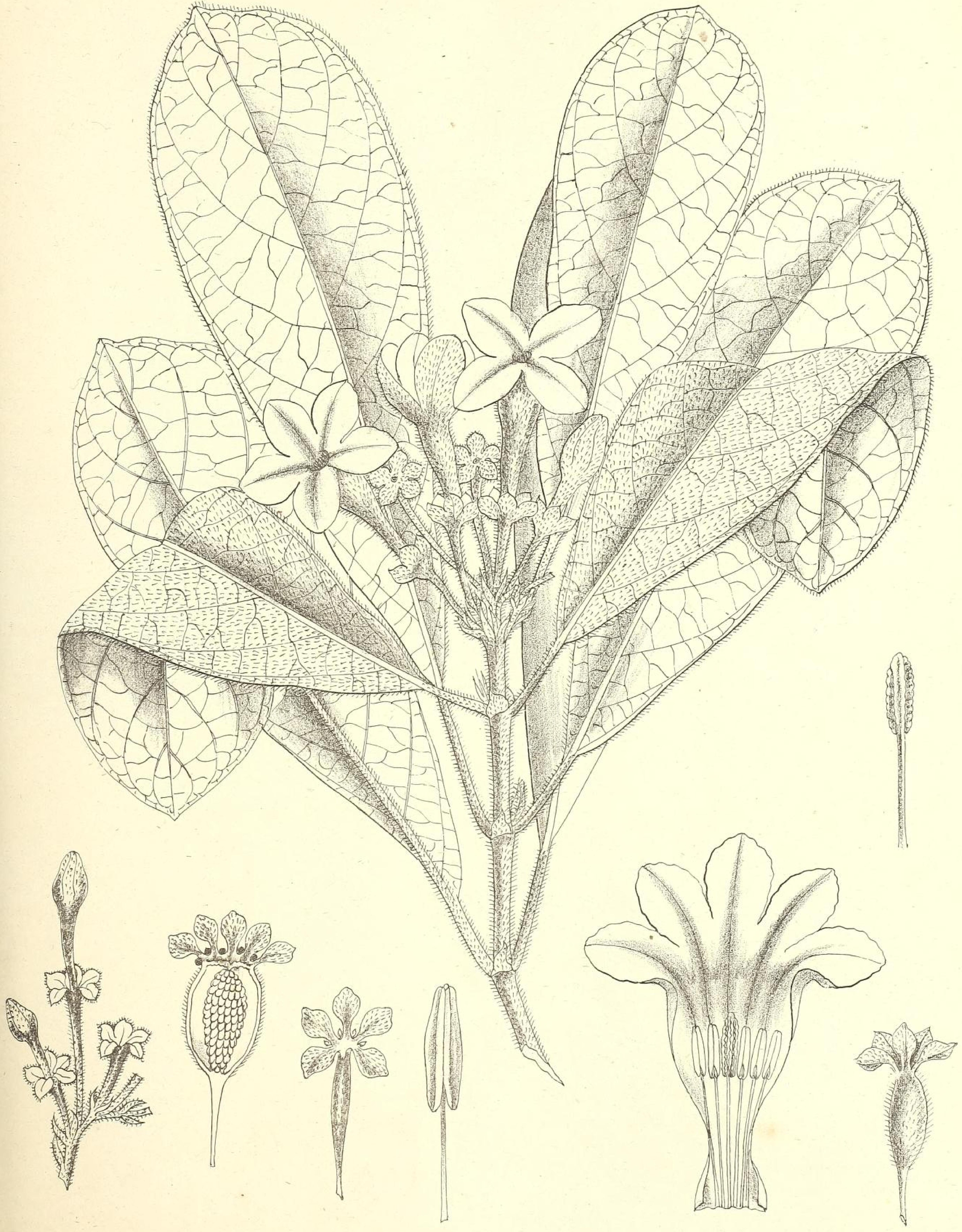
- Acranthera anamallica

Scientific classification
- Kingdom: Plantae
- Clade: Tracheophytes
- Clade: Angiosperms
- Clade: Eudicots
- Clade: Asterids
- Order: Gentianales
- Family: Rubiaceae
- Tribe: Acranthereae
- Genus: Acranthera; Arn. ex Meisn.

Type species
- Acranthera ceylanica Arn. ex Meisn.

Synonyms
- Androtropis R.Br. ex Wall.; Gonyanera Korth.; Psilobium Jack

= Acranthera =

Genus of plants

Acranthera is a genus of flowering plants in the family Rubiaceae. It is found from India to South Central China south to Borneo and the Philippines.

== Species ==
- Acranthera abbreviata Valeton
- Acranthera anamallica Bedd.
- Acranthera athroophlebia Bremek.
- Acranthera atropella Stapf
- Acranthera aurantiaca Valeton ex Bremek.
- Acranthera axilliflora Valeton
- Acranthera bullata Merr.
- Acranthera capitata Valeton
- Acranthera ceylanica Arn. ex Meisn.
- Acranthera didymocarpa (Ridl.) K.M.Wong
- Acranthera endertii Bremek.
- Acranthera frutescens Valeton
- Acranthera grandiflora Bedd.
- Acranthera hallieri Valeton
- Acranthera hirtostipula Valeton
- Acranthera involucrata Valeton
- Acranthera johannis-winkleri Merr.
- Acranthera lanceolata Valeton
- Acranthera longipes Merr.
- Acranthera longipetiolata Merr. ex Bremek.
- Acranthera maculata Valeton
- Acranthera megaphylla Bremek.
- Acranthera monantha Valeton
- Acranthera nieuwenhuisii Valeton ex Bremek.
- Acranthera ophiorhizoides Valeton
- Acranthera parviflora Valeton
- Acranthera philippensis Merr.
- Acranthera ruttenii Bremek.
- Acranthera salmonea Bremek.
- Acranthera siamensis (Kerr) Bremek.
- Acranthera siliquosa Bremek.
- Acranthera simalurensis Bremek.
- Acranthera sinensis C.Y.Wu
- Acranthera strigosa Valeton
- Acranthera tomentosa R.Br. ex Hook.f.
- Acranthera variegata Merr.
- Acranthera velutinervia Bremek.
- Acranthera virescens (Ridl.) ined.
- Acranthera yatesii Merr.
