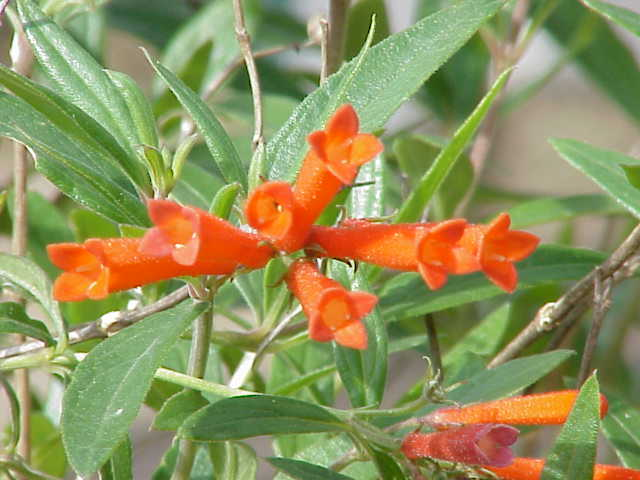
- Bouvardia ternifolia

Scientific classification
- Kingdom: Plantae
- Clade: Tracheophytes
- Clade: Angiosperms
- Clade: Eudicots
- Clade: Asterids
- Order: Gentianales
- Family: Rubiaceae
- Subfamily: Rubioideae; Juss., 1789

= Rubioideae =

Subfamily of flowering plants

Rubioideae is a subfamily of flowering plants in the family Rubiaceae and contains about 7600 species in 27 tribes.

== Tribes ==
- Anthospermeae Cham. & Schltdl. ex DC.
- Argostemmateae Bremek. ex Verdc.
- Clarkelleae Deb
- Colletoecemateae Rydin & B.Bremer
- Coussareeae Hook.f.
- Craterispermeae Verdc.
- Cyanoneuroneae Razafim. & B.Bremer
- Danaideae B.Bremer & Manen
- Dunnieae Rydin & B.Bremer
- Gaertnereae Bremek. ex S.P.Darwin
- Knoxieae Hook.f.
- Lasiantheae B.Bremer & Manen
- Mitchelleae Razafim. & B.Bremer & Manen
- Morindeae Miq.
- Ophiorrhizeae Bremek. ex Verdc.
- Paederieae DC.
- Palicoureeae Robbr. & Manen
- Perameae Bremek. ex S.P.Darwin
- Prismatomerideae Y.Z.Ruan
- Psychotrieae Cham. & Schltdl.
- Putorieae
- Rubieae Baill.
- Schizocoleeae Rydin & B.Bremer
- Schradereae Bremek.
- Seychelleeae Razafim., Kainul. & Rydin
- Spermacoceae Cham. & Schltdl. ex DC.
- Theligoneae Wunderlich ex S.P.Darwin
- Urophylleae Bremek. ex Verdc.
