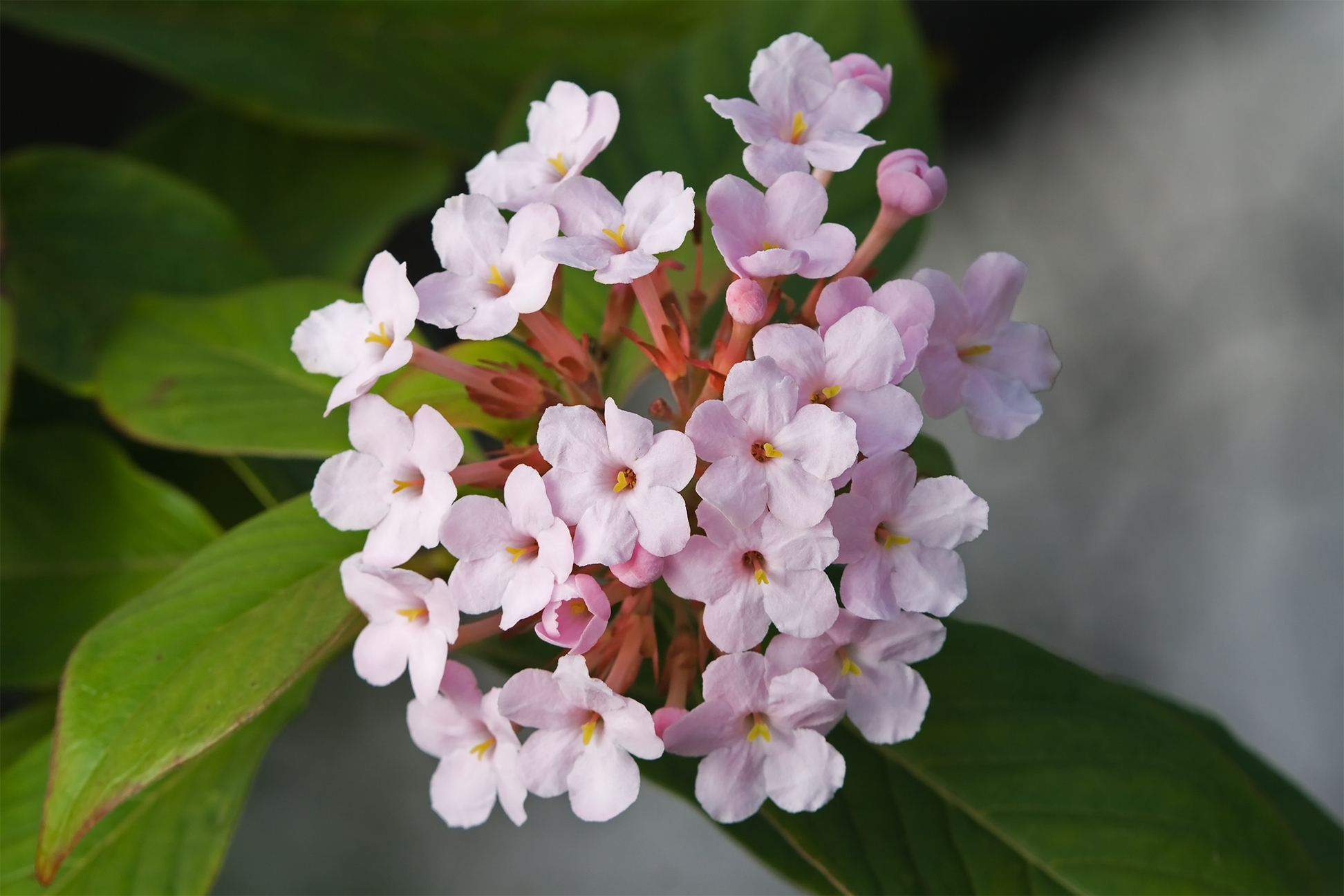
- Luculia gratissima

Scientific classification
- Kingdom: Plantae
- Clade: Tracheophytes
- Clade: Angiosperms
- Clade: Eudicots
- Clade: Asterids
- Order: Gentianales
- Family: Rubiaceae; Juss.

Type genus
- Rubia L.

Subfamilies
- Dialypetalanthoideae; Rubioideae

Synonyms
- See text

= Rubiaceae =

Family of flowering plants

Rubiaceae (/ruːbiˈeɪsiːˌiː, -siˌaɪ/) is a family of flowering plants, commonly known as the coffee, madder, or bedstraw family. It consists of terrestrial trees, shrubs, lianas, or herbs that are recognizable by simple, opposite leaves with interpetiolar stipules and sympetalous actinomorphic flowers. The family contains about 14,200 species in about 615 genera, which makes it the fourth-largest angiosperm family by number of species. Rubiaceae has a cosmopolitan distribution; however, the largest species diversity is concentrated in the tropics and subtropics. Economically important genera include Coffea, the source of coffee; Cinchona, the source of the antimalarial alkaloid quinine; ornamental cultivars (e.g., Gardenia, Ixora, Pentas); and historically some dye plants (e.g., Rubia).

== Description ==
The Rubiaceae are morphologically easily recognizable as a coherent group by a combination of characters: opposite or whorled leaves that are simple and entire, interpetiolar stipules, tubular sympetalous actinomorphic corollas and an inferior ovary.

A wide variety of growth forms are present: shrubs are most common (e.g. Coffea, Psychotria), but members of the family can also be trees (e.g. Cinchona, Nauclea), lianas (e.g. Psychotria samoritourei), or herbs (e.g. Galium, Spermacoce). Some epiphytes are also present (e.g. Myrmecodia). The plants usually contain iridoids, various alkaloids, and raphide crystals are common. The leaves are simple, undivided, and entire; there is only one case of pinnately compound leaves (Pentagonia osapinnata). Leaf blades are usually elliptical, with a cuneate base and an acute tip. In three genera (Pavetta, Psychotria, Sericanthe), bacterial leaf nodules can be observed as dark spots or lines on the leaves. The phyllotaxis is usually decussate, rarely whorled (e.g. Fadogia), or rarely seemingly alternate resulting from the reduction of one leaf at each node (e.g. Sabicea sthenula). Characteristic for the Rubiaceae is the presence of stipules that are mostly fused to an interpetiolar structure on either side of the stem between the opposite leaves. Their inside surface often bears glands called "colleters", which produce mucilaginous compounds protecting the young shoot. The "whorled" leaves of the herbaceous tribe Rubieae have classically been interpreted as true leaves plus interpetiolar leaf-like stipules. The inflorescence is a cyme, rarely of solitary flowers (e.g. Rothmannia), and is either terminal or axillary and paired at the nodes. The 4-5-merous (rarely pleiomerous; e.g. six in Richardia) flowers are usually bisexual and usually epigynous. The perianth is usually biseriate, although the calyx is absent in some taxa (e.g. Theligonum). The calyx mostly has the lobes fused at the base; unequal calyx lobes are not uncommon, and sometimes (e.g. Mussaenda) one lobe is enlarged and coloured (a so-called "semaphyl"). The corolla is sympetalous, mostly actinomorphic, usually tubular, mostly white or creamy but also yellow (e.g. Gardenia spp., Mycelia basiflora), and rarely blue (e.g. Faramea calyptrata) or red (e.g. Alberta magna, Ixora coccinea). The stamens are alternipetalous and epipetalous. Anthers are longitudinal in dehiscence, but are poricidal in some genera (e.g. Rustia, Tresanthera). The gynoecium is syncarpous with an inferior ovary (rarely secondarily superior, e.g. Gaertnera, Pagamea). Placentation is axial, rarely parietal (e.g. Gardenia); ovules are anatropous to hemitropous, unitegmic, with a funicular obturator, one to many per carpel. Nectaries are often present as a nectariferous disk atop the ovary. The fruit is a berry, capsule (e.g. Oldenlandia), drupe (e.g. Coffea, Psychotria), or schizocarp (e.g. Cremocarpon). Red fruits are fairly dominant (e.g. Coffea arabica); yellow (e.g. Rosenbergiodendron formosum), orange (e.g. Vangueria infausta), or blackish fruits (e.g. Pavetta gardeniifolia) are equally common; blue fruits are rather exceptional save in the Psychotrieae and associated tribes. Most fruits are about 1 cm in diameter; very small fruits are relatively rare and occur in herbaceous tribes; very large fruits are rare and confined to the Gardenieae. The seeds are endospermous.

== Distribution and habitat ==
Rubiaceae have a cosmopolitan distribution and are found in nearly every region of the world, except for extreme environments such as the polar regions and deserts. The distribution pattern of the family is very similar to the global distribution of plant diversity overall. However, the largest diversity is distinctly concentrated in the humid tropics and subtropics. An exception is the tribe Rubieae, which is cosmopolitan but centered in temperate regions. Only a few genera are pantropical (e.g. Ixora, Psychotria), many are paleotropical, while Afro-American distributions are rare (e.g. Sabicea). Endemic rubiaceous genera are found in most tropical and subtropical floristic regions of the world. The highest number of species is found in Colombia, Venezuela, and New Guinea. When adjusted for area, Venezuela is the most diverse, followed by Colombia and Cuba.

The Rubiaceae consist of terrestrial and predominantly woody plants. Woody rubiaceous shrubs constitute an important part of the understorey of low- and mid-altitude rainforests. Rubiaceae are tolerant of a broad array of environmental conditions (soil types, altitudes, community structures, etc.) and do not specialize in one specific habitat type (although genera within the family often specialize).

== Ecology ==
=== Flower biology ===
Most members of the Rubiaceae are zoophilous, pollinated mainly by insects. Entomophilous species produce nectar from an epigynous disk at the base of the corolla tube to attract insects. Ornithophily is rare and is found in red-flowered species of Alberta, Bouvardia, and Burchellia. Anemophilous species are found in the tribes Anthospermeae and Theligoneae and are characterized by hermaphroditic or unisexual flowers that exhibit a set of specialized features, such as striking sexual dimorphism, increased receptive surface of the stigmas and pendulous anthers.

Although most Rubiaceae species are hermaphroditic, outbreeding is promoted through sequential hermaphroditism and spatial isolation of the reproductive organs. More complex reproductive strategies include secondary pollen presentation, heterostyly, and unisexual flowers.

Secondary pollen presentation (also known as stylar pollen presentation or ixoroid pollen mechanism) is especially known from the Gardenieae and related tribes. The flowers are proterandrous and the pollen is shed early onto the outside of the stigmas or the upper part of the style, which serve as a pollen receptacle. Increased surface area and irregularity of the pollen receptacle, caused by swellings, hairs, grooves or ridges often ensure a more efficient pollen deposition. After elongation of the style, animals transport the pollen to flowers in the female or receptive stage with exposed stigmatic surfaces. A pollen catapult mechanism is present in the genera Molopanthera and Posoqueria (tribe Posoquerieae) that projects a spherical pollen mass onto visiting hawk moths.

Heterostyly is another mechanism to avoid inbreeding and is widely present in the family Rubiaceae. The tribes containing the largest number of heterostylous species are Spermacoceae and Psychotrieae. Heterostyly is absent in groups that have secondary pollen presentation (e.g. Vanguerieae).

Unisexual flowers also occur in Rubiaceae and most taxa that have this characteristic are dioecious. The two flower morphs are however difficult to observe as they are rather morphologically similar; male flowers have a rudimentary pistil with the ovaries empty and female flowers sterile or rudimentary stamens with empty anthers. Flowers that are morphologically hermaphrodite, but functionally dioecious occur in Pyrostria.

=== Fruit biology ===
The dispersal units in Rubiaceae can be entire fruits, syncarps, mericarps, pyrenes or seeds. Fleshy fruit taxa are probably all (endo)zoochorous (e.g. tribes Pavetteae, Psychotrieae), while the dispersal of dry fruits is often unspecialized (e.g. tribes Knoxieae, Spermacoceae). When seeds function as diaspores, the dispersal is either anemochorous or hydrochorous. The three types of wind-dispersed diaspores in Rubiaceae are dust seeds (rare, e.g. Lerchea), plumed seeds (e.g. Hillia), and winged seeds (e.g. Coutarea). Long-distance dispersal by ocean currents is very rare (e.g. the seashore tree Guettarda speciosa). Other dispersal mechanisms are absent or at least very rare. Some Spermacoceae having seeds with elaiosomes are probably myrmecochorous (e.g. Spermacoce hepperiana). Epizoochorous taxa are limited to herbaceous Rubiaceae (e.g. Galium aparine fruits are densely covered with hooked bristly hairs).

=== Associations with other organisms ===
The genera Anthorrhiza, Hydnophytum, Myrmecodia, Myrmephytum, and Squamellaria are succulent epiphytes that have evolved a mutualistic relationship with ants. Their hypocotyl grows out into an ant-inhabited tuber. Some shrubs or trees have ant holes in their stems (e.g. Globulostylis). Some Rubiaceae species have domatia that are inhabited by mites (viz. acarodomatia; e.g. Plectroniella armata).

An intimate association between bacteria and plants is found in three rubiaceous genera (viz. Pavetta, Psychotria, and Sericanthe). The presence of endophytic bacteria is visible by eye because of the formation of dark spots or nodules in the leaf blades. The endophytes have been identified as Burkholderia bacteria. A second type of bacterial leaf symbiosis is found in the genera Fadogia, Fadogiella, Globulostylis, Rytigynia, and Vangueria (all belonging to the tribe Vanguerieae), and in some species of Empogona and Tricalysia (both belonging to the tribe Coffeeae), where Burkholderia bacteria are found freely distributed among the mesophyll cells and no leaf nodules are formed. The hypothesis regarding the function of the symbiosis is that the endophytes provide chemical protection against herbivory by producing certain toxic secondary metabolites.

== Etymology ==
The family Rubiaceae is named after Rubia, a name used by Pliny the Elder in his Naturalis Historia for madder (Rubia tinctorum). The roots of this plant have been used since ancient times to extract alizarin and purpurin, two red dyes used for coloring clothes. The name rubia is therefore derived from the Latin word ruber, meaning red. The well-known genus Rubus (blackberries and raspberries) is unrelated and belongs to Rosaceae, the rose family.

== Systematics ==
=== Taxonomy ===
The name Rubiaceae (nomen conservandum) was published in 1789 by Antoine Laurent de Jussieu, but the name was already mentioned in 1782.

Several historically accepted families are included in Rubiaceae:

- Aparinaceae
- Asperulaceae
- Catesbaeaceae
- Cephalanthaceae
- Cinchonaceae
- Coffeaceae
- Coutariaceae
- Dialypetalanthaceae
- Galiaceae
- Gardeniaceae
- Guettardaceae
- Hameliaceae
- Hedyotidaceae
- Henriqueziaceae
- Houstoniaceae
- Hydrophylacaceae
- Lippayaceae
- Lygodisodeaceae
- Naucleaceae
- Nonateliaceae
- Operculariaceae
- Pagamaeaceae
- Psychotriaceae
- Randiaceae
- Sabiceaceae
- Spermacoceaceae
- Theligonaceae

==== Subfamilies and tribes ====
The classical classification system of Rubiaceae distinguished only two subfamilies: Cinchonoideae, characterized by more than one ovule in each locule, and Coffeoideae, having one ovule in each locule. This distinction, however, was criticized because of the distant position of two obviously related tribes, viz. Gardenieae with many ovules in Cinchonoideae and Ixoreae with one ovule in Coffeoideae, and because in species of Tarenna the number of ovules varies from one to several in each locule. During the 20th century, other morphological characters were used to delineate subfamilies, e.g. stylar pollen presentation, raphides, endosperm, heterostyly, etc. On this basis, three or eight subfamilies were recognised. The last subfamilial classification solely based on morphological characters divided Rubiaceae into four subfamilies: Cinchonoideae, Ixoroideae, Antirheoideae, and Rubioideae. In general, problems of subfamilies delimitation in Rubiaceae based on morphological characters are linked with the extreme naturalness of the family, hence a relatively low divergence of its members.

The introduction of molecular phylogenetics in Rubiaceae research has corroborated or rejected several of the conclusions made in the pre-molecular era. There was support for the subfamilies Cinchonoideae, Ixoroideae, and Rubioideae, although differently circumscribed, and Antirheoideae was shown to be polyphyletic. For a long time, the classification with three subfamilies (Cinchonoideae, Ixoroideae, and Rubioideae) was followed. However, an alternative opinion existed with only two subfamilies: an expanded Cinchonoideae (that includes Ixoroideae, Coptosapelteae, and Luculieae) and Rubioideae. Finally, more and more evidence pointed towards a two-family classification. The adoption of the Melbourne Code for botanical nomenclature had an unexpected impact on many names that have been long in use and are well-established in literature. According to the Melbourne Code, the subfamilial name Ixoroideae had to be replaced by Dialypetalanthoideae. This means that the two subfamilies in Rubiaceae now are: Dialypetalanthoideae and Rubioideae. The monogeneric tribes Coptosapelteae, Acranthereae, and Luculieae are not placed within a subfamily and are sister to the rest of Rubiaceae. The following overview shows the latest classification of the family, with two subfamilies and 72 tribes. The approximate number of species and genera are indicated between brackets (species/genera).

Unplaced tribes (76/3)

- Acranthereae Bremek. ex S.P.Darwin (16/1)
- Coptosapelteae Bremek. ex S.P.Darwin (56/1)
- Luculieae Rydin & B.Bremer (4/1)

===== Rubioideae =====
Authority: Verdc.; over 8000 spp.

- Aitchisonieae Bordbar, Razafim. & Mirtadz. (1/1)
- Anthospermeae Cham. & Schltdl. ex DC. (210/12)
- Argostemmateae Bremek. ex Verdc. (251/6)
- Colletoecemateae Rydin & B.Bremer (3/1)
- Coussareeae Hook.f. (414/10)
- Craterispermeae Verdc. (32/1)
- Cyanoneuroneae Razafim. & B.Bremer (5/1)
- Danaideae B.Bremer & Manen (67/3)
- Dunnieae Rydin & B.Bremer (1/1)
- Foonchewieae R.J.Wang (2/1)
- Gaertnereae Bremek. ex S.P.Darwin (116/2)
- Knoxieae Hook.f. (130/16)
- Lasiantheae B.Bremer & Manen (291/4)
- Mitchelleae Razafim. & B.Bremer & Manen (16/2)
- Morindeae Miq. (163/5)
- Ophiorrhizeae Bremek. ex Verdc. (420/6)
- Paederieae DC. (98/6)
- Palicoureeae Robbr. & Manen (1112/9)
- Perameae Bremek. ex S.P.Darwin (14/1)
- Prismatomerideae Y.Z.Ruan (27/2)
- Psychotrieae Cham. & Schltdl. (1819/1)
- Putorieae Sweet (36/1)
- Rubieae Baill. (969/14)
- Schizocoleeae Rydin & B.Bremer (2/1)
- Schradereae Bremek. (62/1)
- Seychelleeae Razafim., Kainul. & Rydin (1/1)
- Spermacoceae Cham. & Schltdl. ex DC. (1553/86)
- Temnopterygeae Razafim. & Rydin (1/1)
- Theligoneae Wunderlich ex S.P.Darwin (4/1)
- Urophylleae Bremek. ex Verdc. (251/5)

===== Dialypetalanthoideae =====
Authority: Reveal; almost 6000 spp.

- Airospermeae Kainul. & B.Bremer (7/2)
- Alberteae Hook.f. (9/3)
- Aleisanthieae Mouly, J.Florence & B.Bremer (10/3)
- Augusteae Kainul. & B.Bremer (104/2)
- Bertiereae Bridson (57/1)
- Chiococceae Benth. & Hook.f. (239/32)
- Chioneae Razafim. & Rydin (27/2)
- Cinchoneae DC. (125/8)
- Clavistigmateae T.Y.Tu & P.W.Xie (1/1)
- Coffeeae DC. (311/12)
- Cordiereae A.Rich. ex DC. emend. Mouly (123/12)
- Crossopterygeae F.White ex Bridson (1/1)
- Dialypetalantheae Reveal (310/35)
- Gardenieae A.Rich. ex DC. (655/64)
- Glionnetieae Razafim. & Rydin (1/1)
- Greeneeae Mouly, J.Florence & B.Bremer (9/1)
- Guettardeae DC. (769/20)
- Hamelieae A.Rich. ex DC. (181/13)
- Henriquezieae Benth. & Hook.f. (36/3)
- Hillieae Bremek. ex S.P.Darwin (29/3)
- Hymenodictyeae Razafim. & B.Bremer (32/2)
- Isertieae A.Rich. ex DC. (17/2)
- Ixoreae Benth. & Hook.f. (564/1)
- Jackieae Korth. (1/1)
- Mussaendeae Hook.f. (223/7)
- Naucleeae DC. ex Miq. (194/19)
- Octotropideae Bedd. (139/33)
- Pavetteae A.Rich. ex Dumort. (652/20)
- Posoquerieae Delprete (23/2)
- Retiniphylleae Hook.f. (21/1)
- Rondeletieae DC. ex Miq. (192/18)
- Sabiceeae Bremek. (169/4)
- Scyphiphoreae Kainul. & B.Bremer (1/1)
- Sherbournieae Mouly & B.Bremer (57/4)
- Sipaneeae Bremek. (43/10)
- Steenisieae Kainul. & B.Bremer (5/1)
- Strumpfieae Delprete & T.J.Motley (1/1)
- Trailliaedoxeae Kainul. & B.Bremer (1/1)
- Vanguerieae A.Rich. ex Dumort. (650/28)

==== Genera ====
The family Rubiaceae contains about 14,200 species in 615 genera. This makes it the fourth-largest family of flowering plants by number of species and the fifth-largest by number of genera. In total, 1386 generic names have been published, with almost half of the names appearing in the 19th century. The average increase of new generic names is 5.05 per year.

The median number of species per genus is 4 but there are 30 genera with more than 100 species and 191 genera are monotypic, which account for 31% of all genera but only for 1.3% of all species. Psychotria, with around 1645 species, is the largest genus in the family and the third-largest genus in angiosperms, after the legume Astragalus and the orchid Bulbophyllum.

Generic names are between 3 and 20 letters long and names beginning with P are the most frequent. The names often have their origin in Greek and commonly refer to a plant feature or are named after a person.

=== Phylogeny ===
Molecular studies have demonstrated the phylogenetic placement of Rubiaceae within the order Gentianales and the monophyly of the family is confirmed. The relationships of the two subfamilies of Rubiaceae together with the tribes Acranthereae, Coptosapelteae, and Luculieae are shown in the phylogenetic tree below. The placement of these three tribes relative to the two subfamilies has not been fully resolved.

- Rubiaceae
  - - Luculieae
  - - Acranthereae
    - Coptosapelteae
  - - Rubioideae
    - Dialypetalanthoideae

=== Evolution ===
The fossil history of the Rubiaceae goes back at least as far as the Eocene. The geographic distribution of these fossils, coupled with the fact that they represent all three subfamilies, is indicative of an earlier origin for the family, probably in the Late Cretaceous or Paleocene. Although fossils dating back to the Cretaceous and Palaeocene have been referred to the family by various authors, none of these fossils has been confirmed as belonging to the Rubiaceae.

The oldest confirmed fossils, which are fruits that strongly resemble those of the genus Emmenopterys, were found in Washington and are 48–49 million years old. A fossil infructescence and fruit found in 44 million-year-old strata in Oregon was assigned to Emmenopterys dilcheri, an extinct species. The next-oldest fossils date to the Late Eocene and include Canthium from Australia, Faramea from Panama, Guettarda from New Caledonia, and Paleorubiaceophyllum, an extinct genus from the southeastern United States.

Fossil Rubiaceae are known from three regions in the Eocene (North America north of Mexico, Mexico-Central America-Caribbean, and Southeast Pacific-Asia). In the Oligocene, they are found in these three regions plus Africa. In the Miocene, they are found in these four regions plus South America and Europe.

== Uses ==
=== Food ===
No staple foods are found in the Rubiaceae, but some species are consumed locally and fruits may be used as famine food. Examples are African medlar fruits (e.g. V. infausta, V. madagascariensis), African peach (Nauclea latifolia), and noni (Morinda citrifolia).

=== Beverage ===
The most economically important member of the family is the genus Coffea, used to produce coffee. Coffea includes 124 species, but only three species are cultivated for coffee production: C. arabica, C. canephora, and C. liberica.

=== Medicinal ===
The bark of trees in the genus Cinchona is the source of a variety of alkaloids, the most familiar of which is quinine, one of the first agents effective in treating malaria. Woodruff (Galium odoratum) is a small herbaceous perennial that contains coumarin, a natural precursor of warfarin, and the South American plant Carapichea ipecacuanha is the source of the emetic ipecac. Psychotria viridis is frequently used as a source of dimethyltryptamine in the preparation of ayahuasca, a psychoactive decoction. The bark of the species Breonadia salicina have been used in traditional African medicine for many years. The leaves of the Kratom plant (Mitragyna speciosa) contain a variety of alkaloids, including several psychoactive alkaloids and is traditionally prepared and consumed in Southeast Asia, where it has been known to exhibit both painkilling and stimulant qualities, behaving as a μ-opioid receptor agonist, and often being used in traditional Thai medicine in a similar way to and often as a replacement for opioid painkillers like morphine.

=== Ornamentals ===
Originally from China, the common gardenia (Gardenia jasminoides) is a widely grown garden plant and flower in frost-free climates worldwide. Several other species from the genus are also seen in horticulture. The genus Ixora contains plants cultivated in warmer-climate gardens; the most commonly grown species, Ixora coccinea, is frequently used for pretty red-flowering hedges. Mussaenda cultivars with enlarged, colored calyx lobes are shrubs with the aspect of Hydrangea; they are mainly cultivated in tropical Asia. The New Zealand native Coprosma repens is a commonly used plant for hedges. The South African Rothmannia globosa is seen as a specimen tree in horticulture. Nertera granadensis is a well-known house plant cultivated for its conspicuous orange berries. Other ornamental plants include Mitchella, Morinda, Pentas, and Rubia.

=== Dyes ===
Rose madder, the crushed root of Rubia tinctorum, yields a red dye, and the tropical Morinda citrifolia yields a yellow dye.

== Culture ==
- Cinchona officinalis is the national tree of Ecuador and Peru.
- Coffea arabica is the national flower of Yemen.
- Ixora coccinea is the national flower of Suriname.
- Warszewiczia coccinea is the national flower of Trinidad and Tobago.

== Image gallery ==
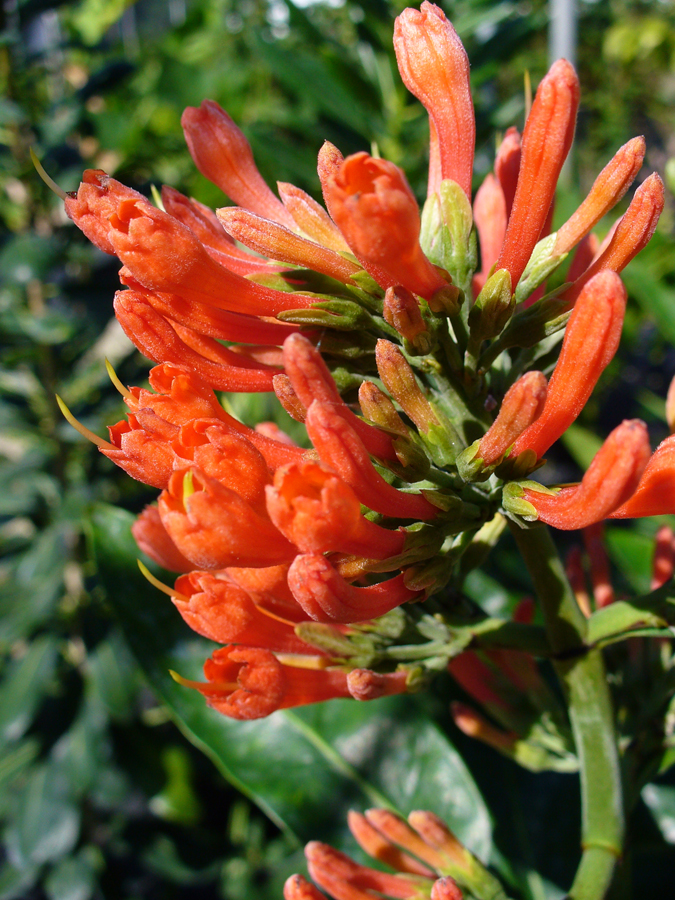
Alberta magna

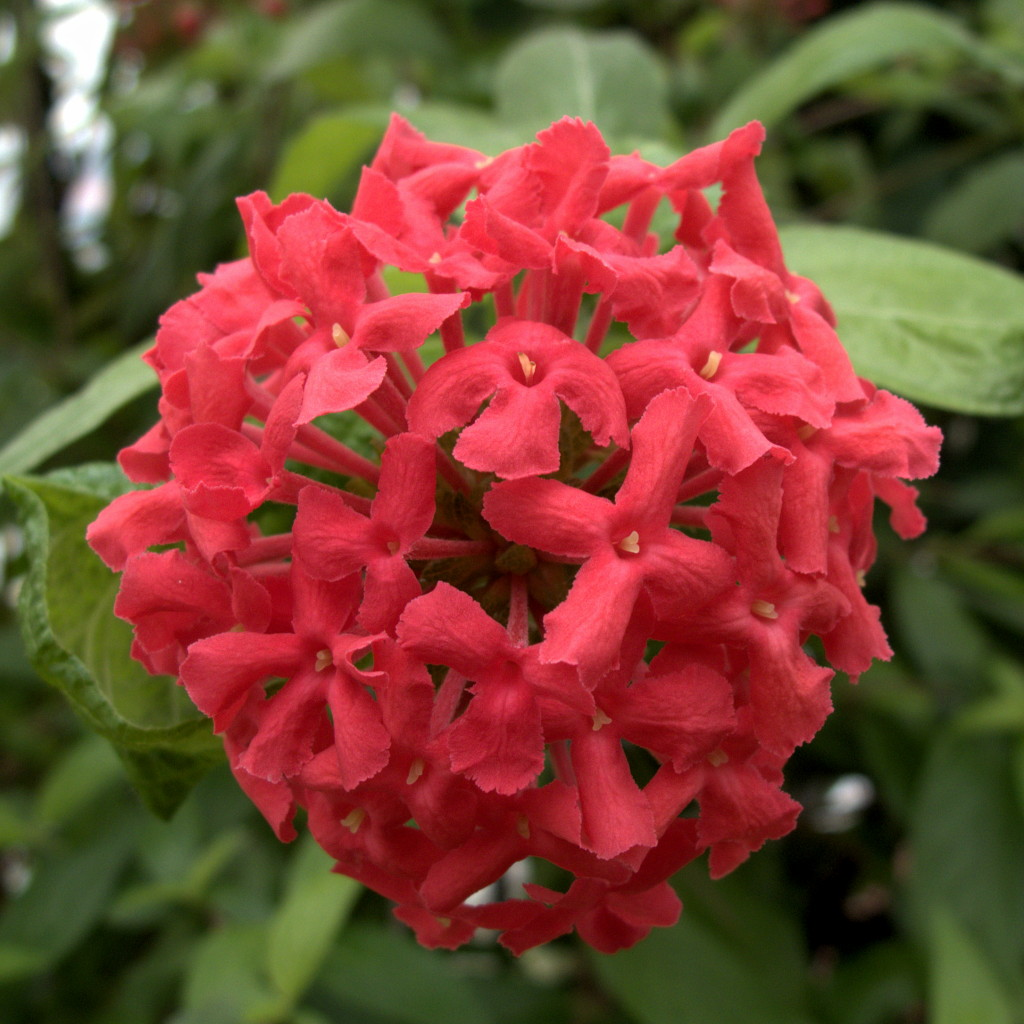
Arachnothryx leucophylla

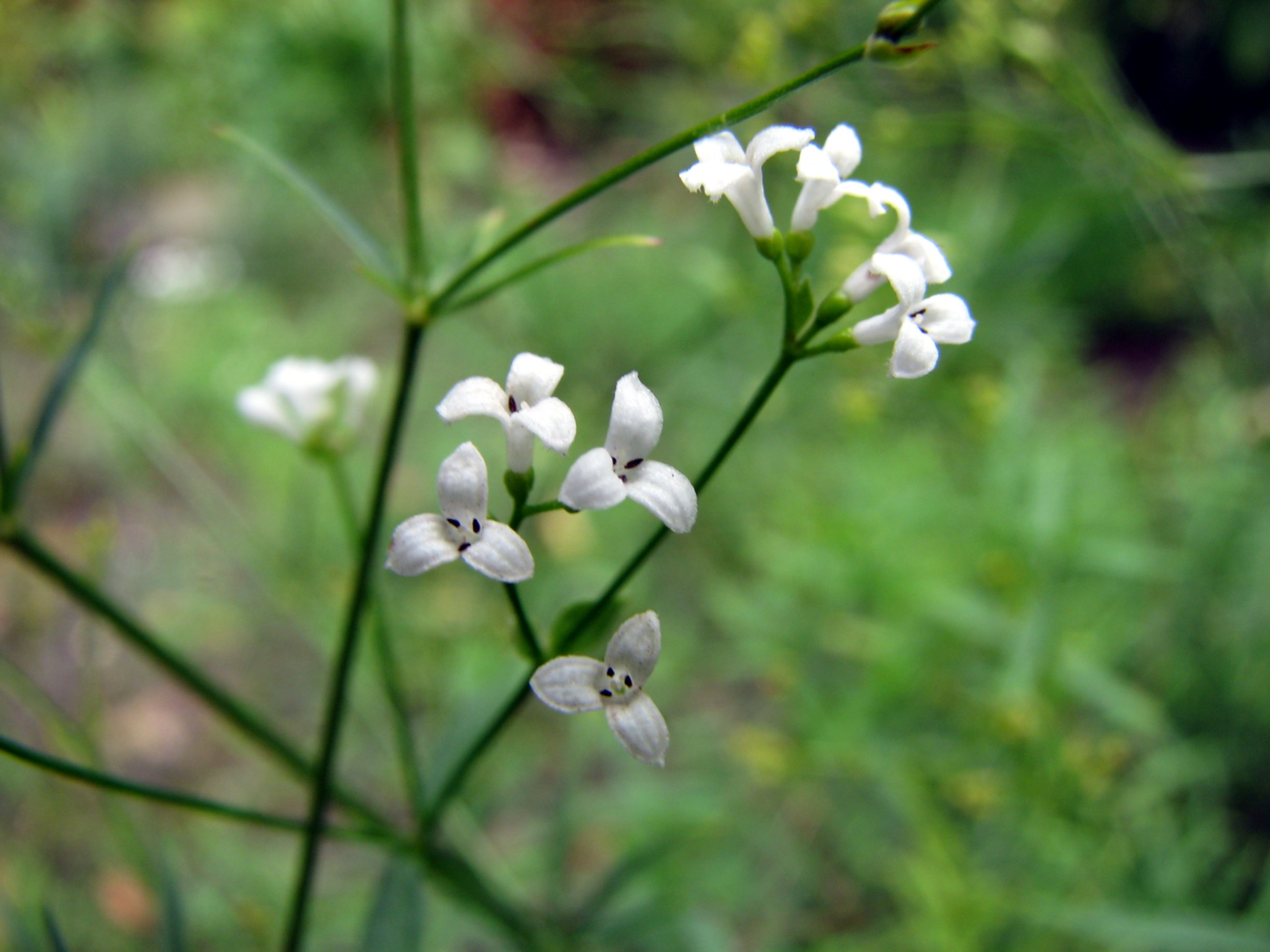
Asperula tinctoria

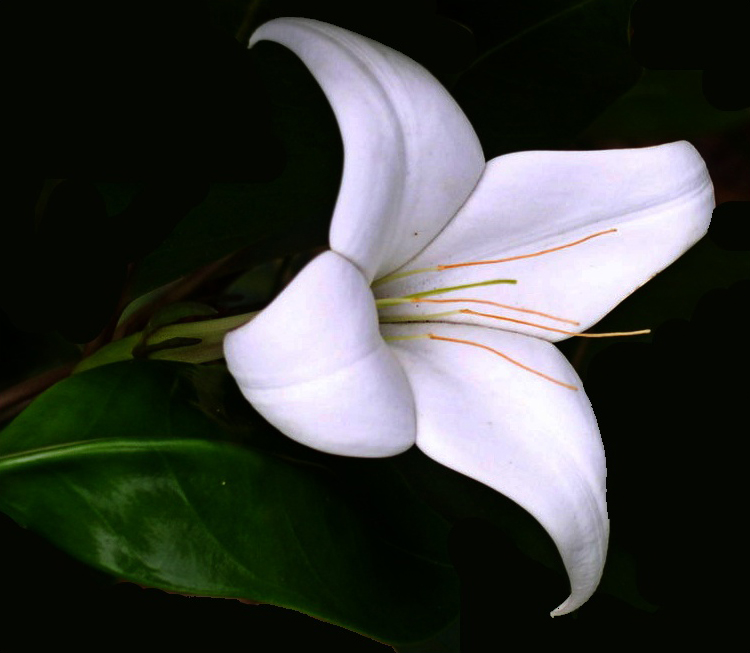
Bikkia philippinensis

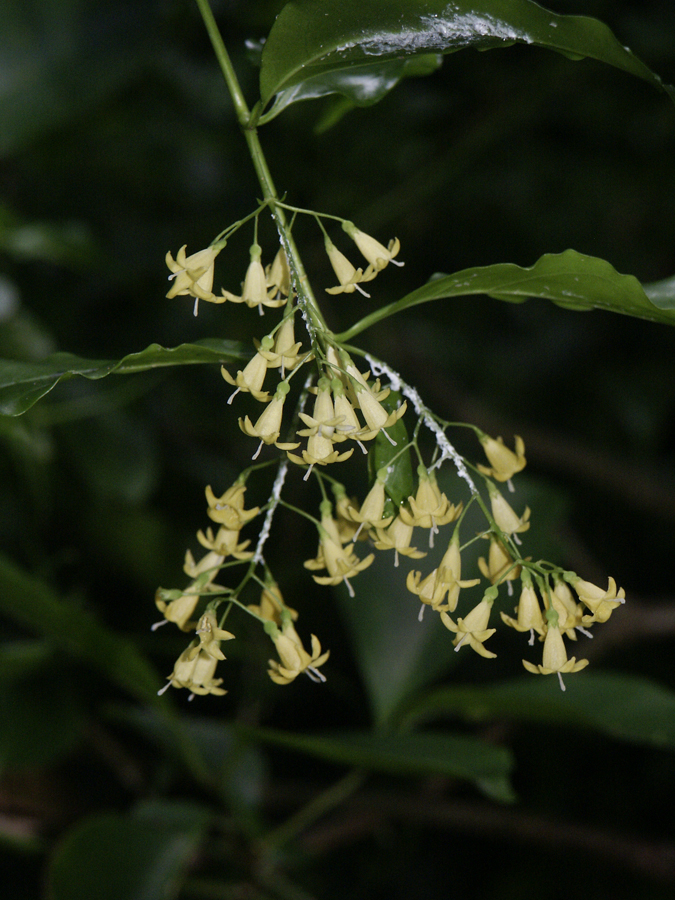
Chiococca alba

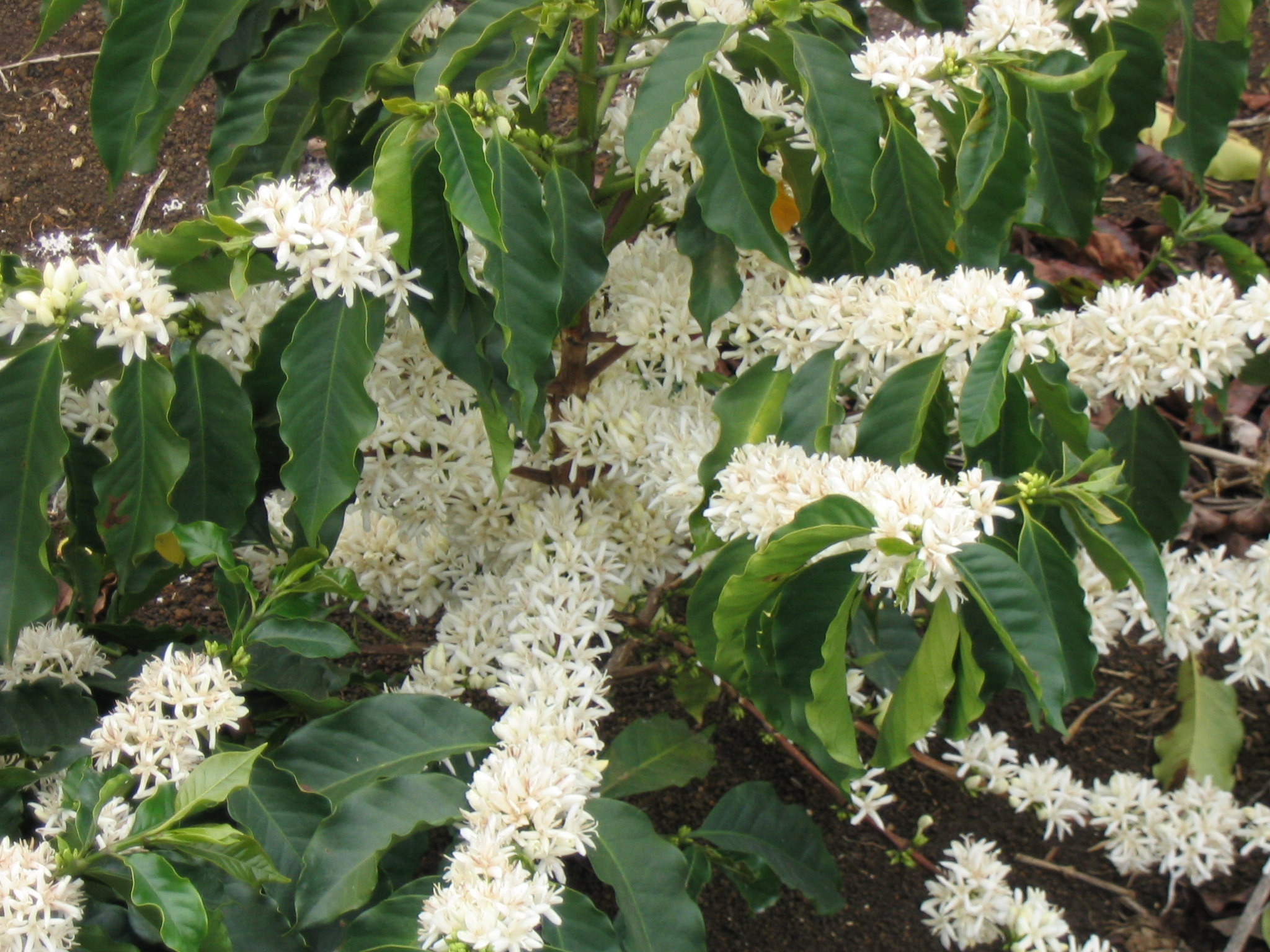
Coffea arabica

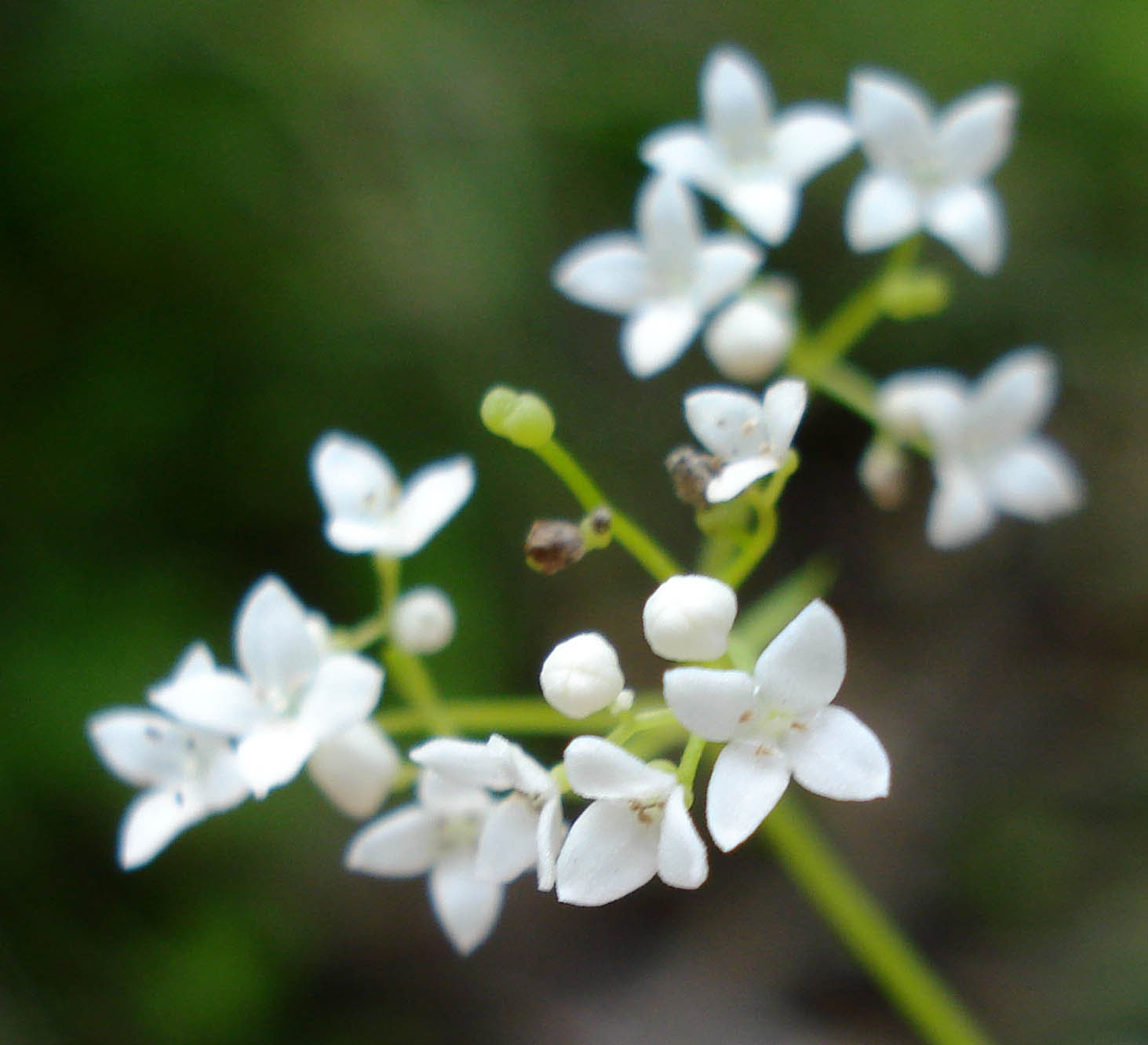
Galium uliginosum

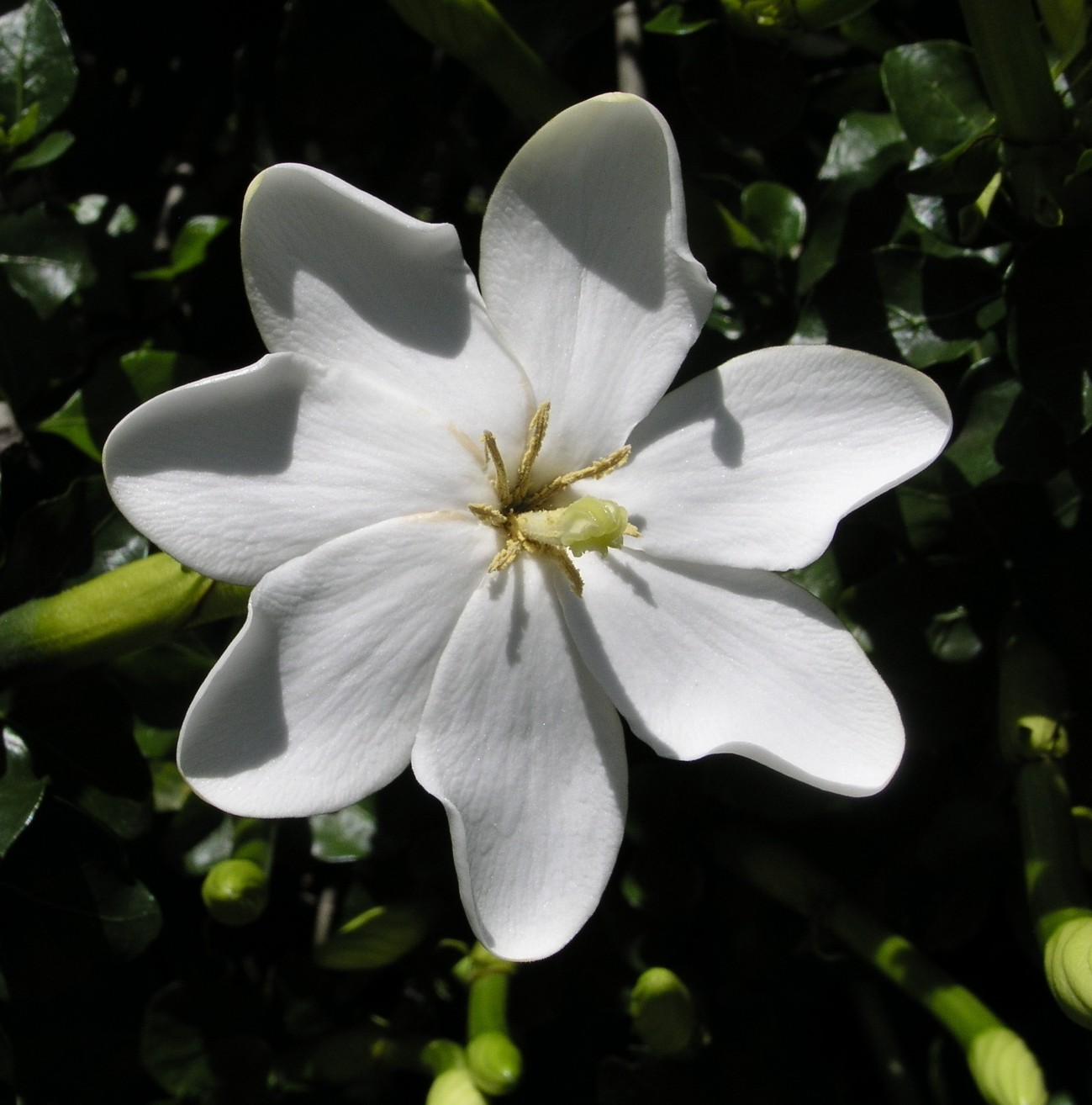
Gardenia thunbergia

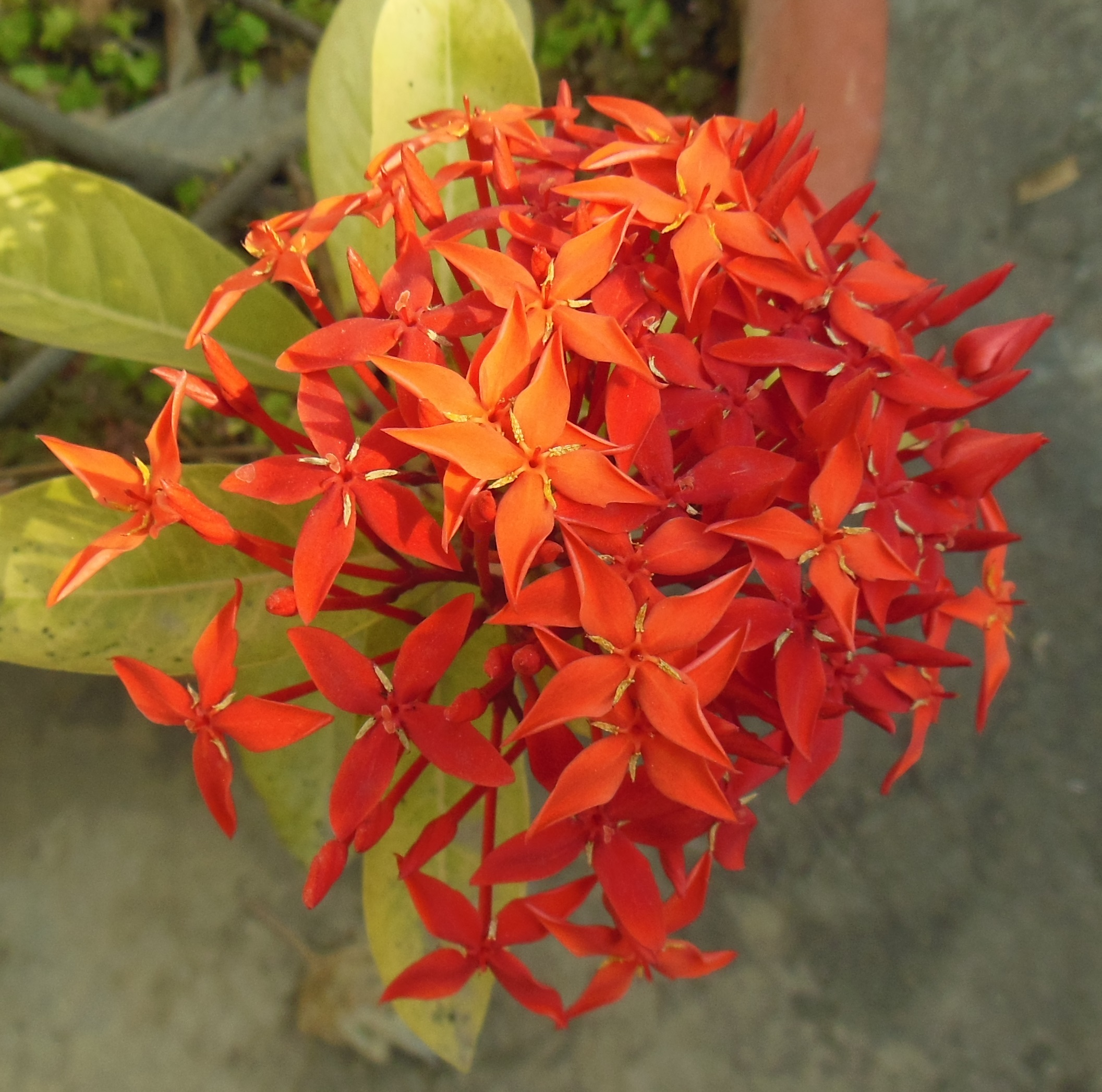
Ixora coccinea

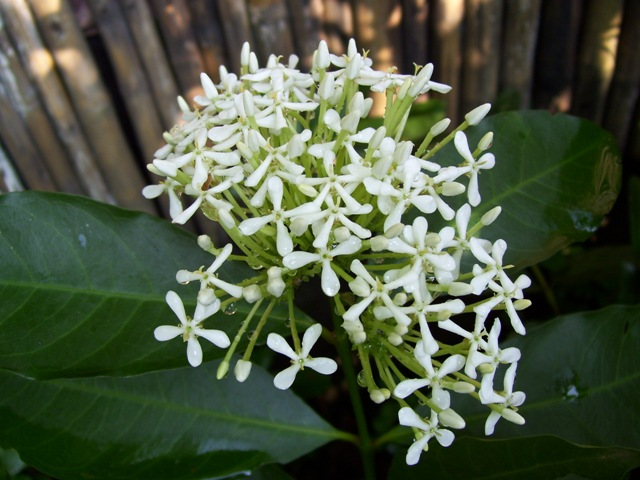
Ixora javanica

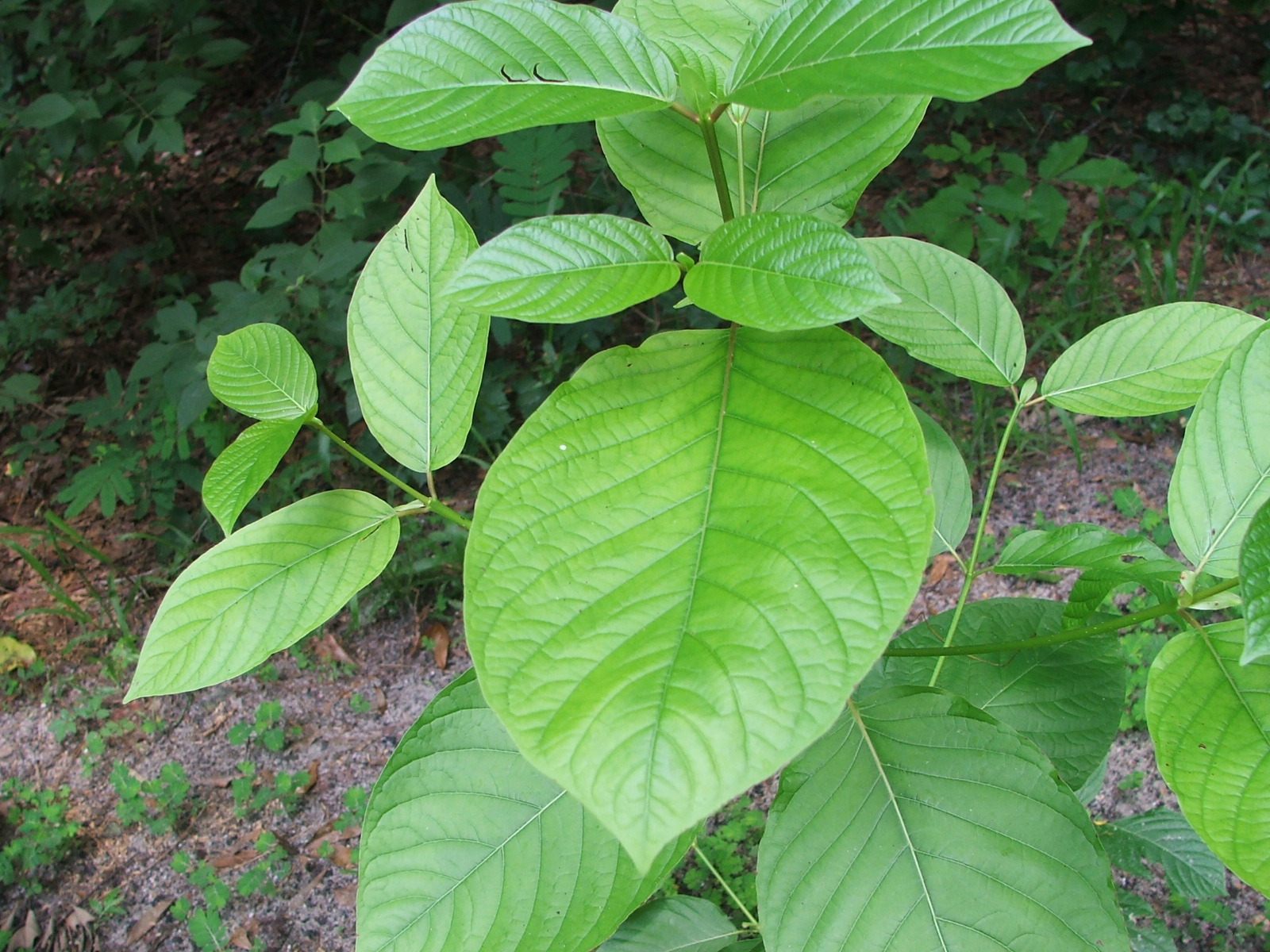
Mitragyna speciosa

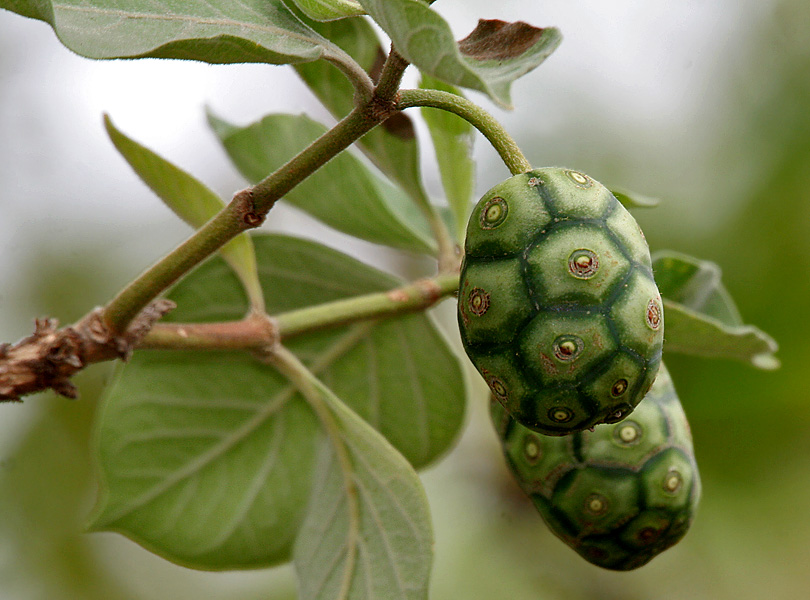
Morinda pubescens

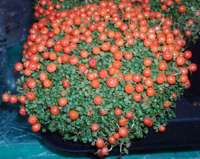
Nertera granadensis

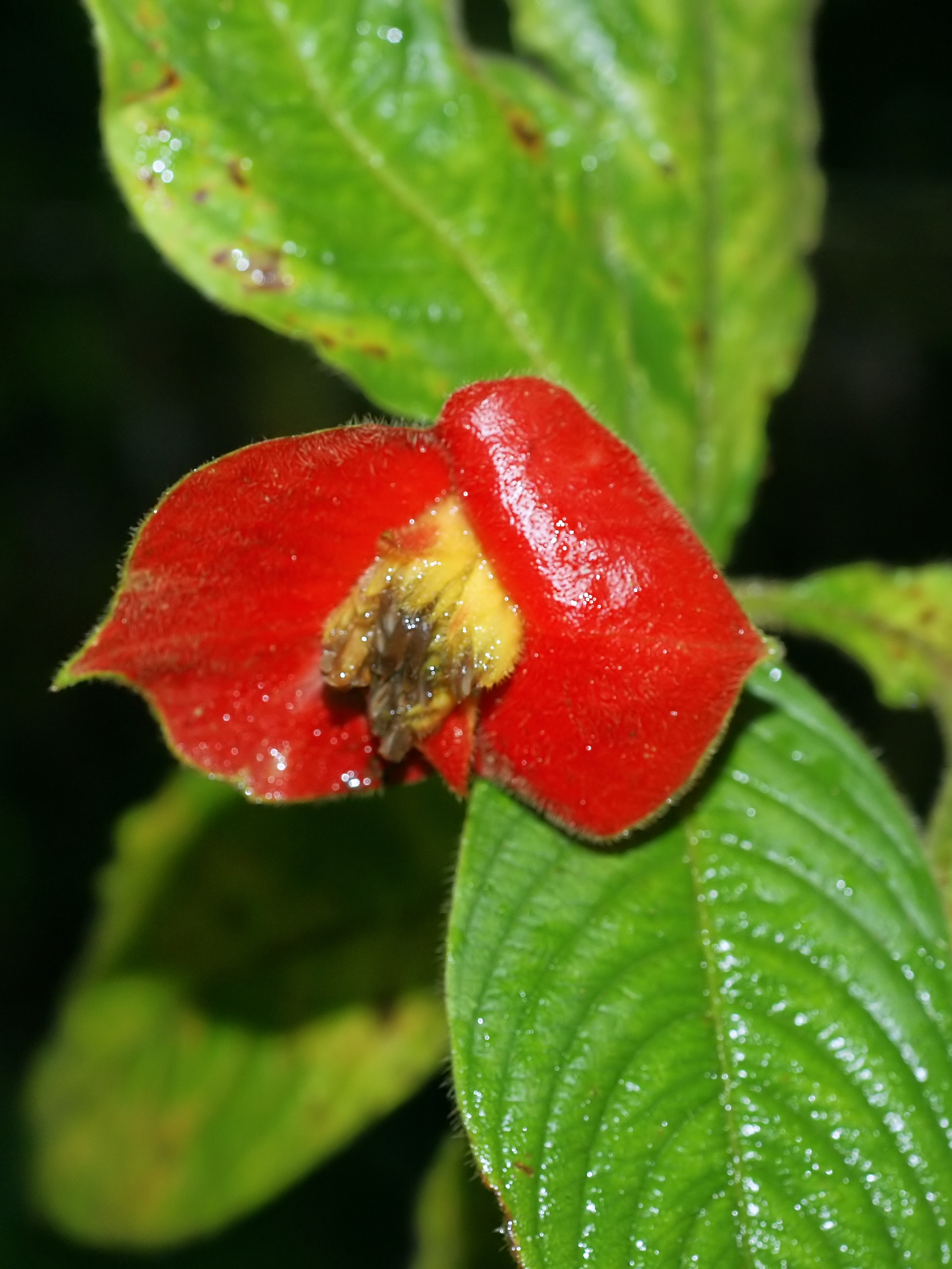
Psychotria poeppigiana

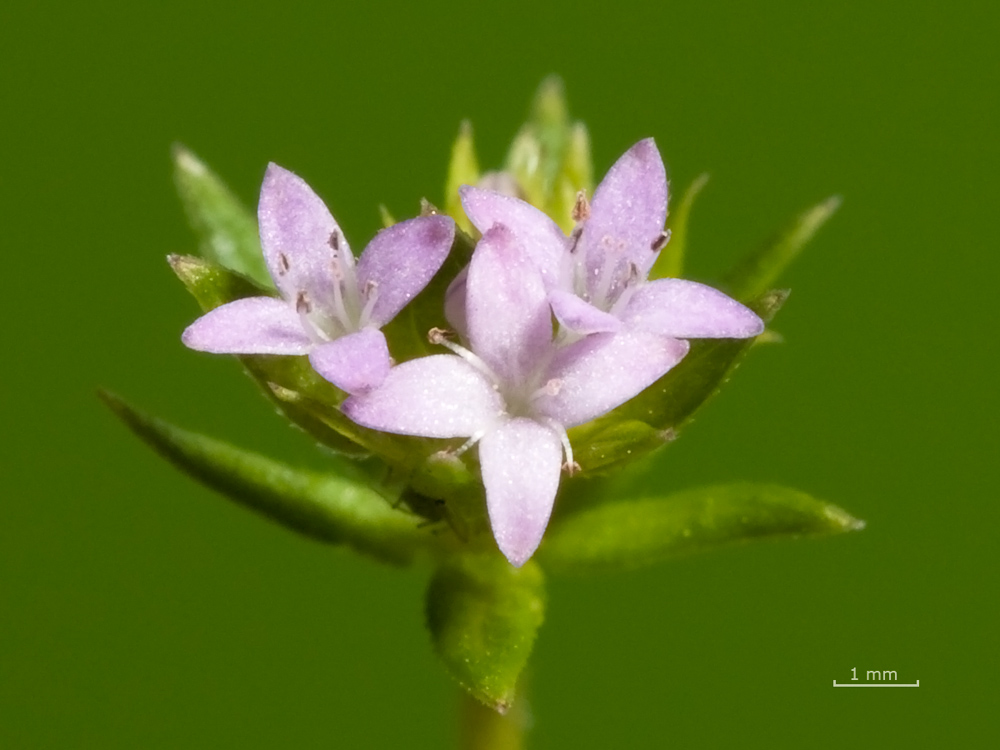
Sherardia arvensis
