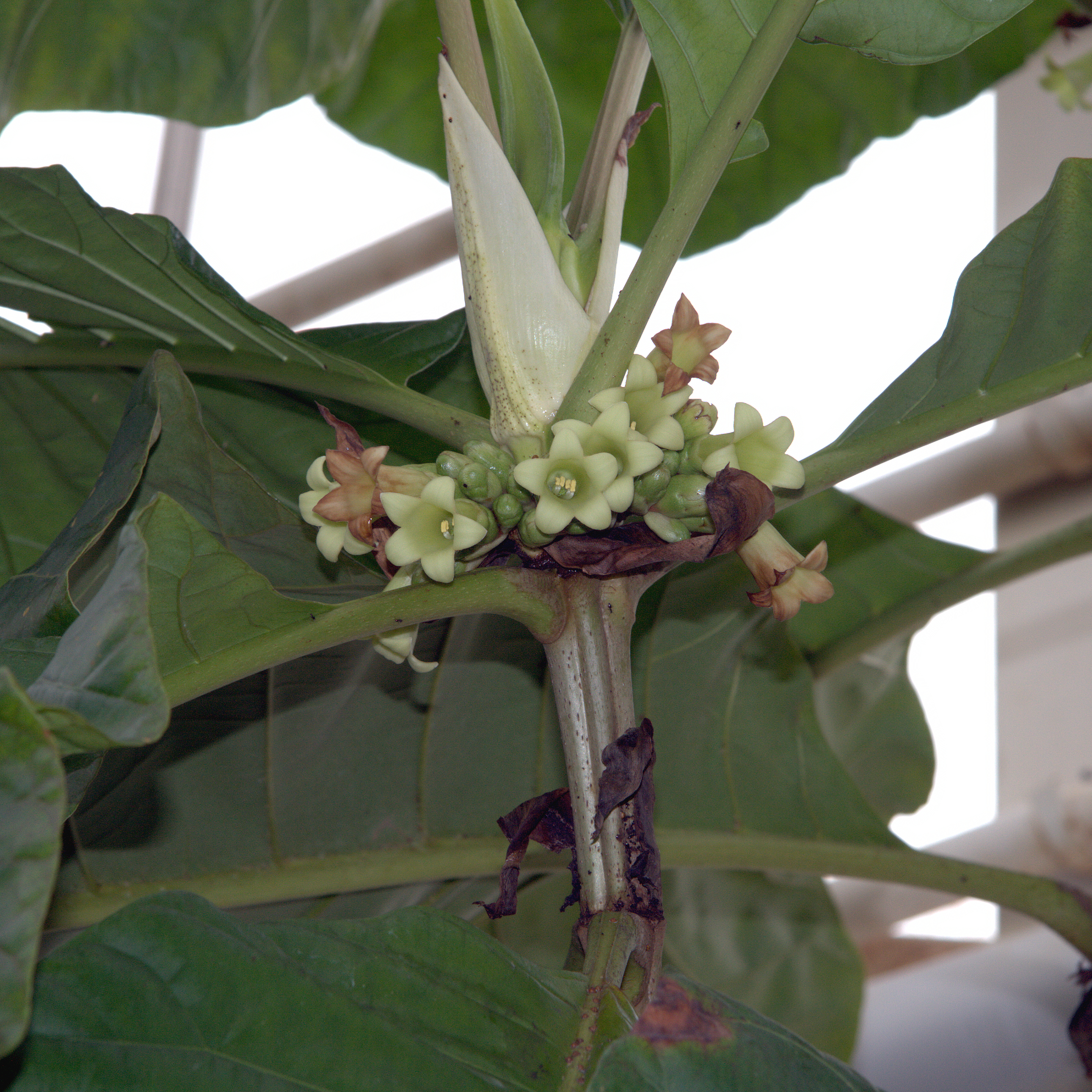
- Pentagonia macrophylla

Scientific classification
- Kingdom: Plantae
- Clade: Tracheophytes
- Clade: Angiosperms
- Clade: Eudicots
- Clade: Asterids
- Order: Gentianales
- Family: Rubiaceae
- Subfamily: Ixoroideae
- Tribe: Dialypetalantheae; Reveal

Type genus
- Dialypetalanthus Kuhlm.

Synonyms
- Calycophylleae L.Andersson & C.H.Perss.; Condamineeae Benth. & Hook.f.; Hippotideae M.C.G.Kirkbr.; Simireae Bremek. ex S.P.Darwin; Tammsieae M.C.G.Kirkbr.

= Dialypetalantheae =

Tribe of flowering plants

Dialypetalantheae, synonym Condamineeae, is a tribe of flowering plants in the family Rubiaceae and contains about 305 species in 31 genera. Most genera are found in Central and Southern Tropical America, but a few occur in Southeast Asia.

== Taxonomy ==
The tribe was first described, as Condamineeae, by George Bentham and Joseph Dalton Hooker in 1873. A change in the International Code of Nomenclature for algae, fungi, and plants in 2011 extended the conservation of family names to subtaxa that include the type of the conserved family name. As Dialypetalanthaceae is a conserved name, based on the genus Dialypetalanthus, any tribe that includes this genus must be called Dialypetalantheae. The name was published by James L. Reveal in 2012.

=== Genera ===
Currently accepted names

- Alseis Schott (18 sp.) - Southern Mexico to Southern Tropical America
- Bathysa C.Presl (10 sp.) - Southern Tropical America
- Bothriospora Hook.f. (1 sp.) - Southern Tropical America
- Calycophyllum DC. (11 sp.) - Mexico to Tropical America
- Capirona Spruce (1 sp.) - Southern Tropical America
- Chimarrhis Jacq. (15 sp.) - Tropical America
- Condaminea DC. (5 sp.) - Central and Southern Tropical America
- Dialypetalanthus Kuhlm. (1 sp.) - Southern Tropical America
- Dioicodendron Steyerm. (1 sp.) - Andes
- Dolichodelphys K.Schum. & K.Krause (1 sp.) - Venezuela, Colombia, Ecuador, Peru
- Dolicholobium A.Gray (28 sp.) - Central Malesia to Southwestern Pacific
- Elaeagia Wedd. (25 sp.) - Mexico to Tropical America
- Emmenopterys Oliv. (2 sp.) - China, Myanmar, Thailand, Vietnam
- Ferdinandusa Pohl (24 sp.) - Tropical America
- Hippotis Ruiz & Pav. (12 sp.) - Central and Southern Tropical America
- Lintersemina Humberto Mend., Celis & M.A.González
- Macbrideina Standl. (1 sp.) - Colombia, Ecuador, Peru
- Macrocnemum P.Browne (6 sp.) - Tropical America
- Mastixiodendron Melch. (7 sp.) - Maluku Islands, Bismarck Archipelago, Papua New Guinea, Solomon Islands, Fiji
- Mussaendopsis Baill. (3 sp.) - Malesia
- Parachimarrhis Ducke (1 sp.) - Southern Tropical America
- Pentagonia Benth. (37 sp.) - Central and Southern Tropical America
- Picardaea Urb. (1 sp.) - Caribbean
- Pinckneya Michx. (1 sp.) - Southeastern U.S.A.
- Pogonopus Klotzsch (3 sp.) - Tropical America
- Rustia Klotzsch (17 sp.) - Tropical America
- Schizocalyx Wedd. (9 sp.) - Costa Rica to Southern Tropical America
- Simira Aubl. (44 sp.) - Mexico to Southern Tropical America
- Sommera Schltdl. (10 sp.) - Mexico to Peru
- Tammsia H.Karst. (1 sp.) - Western South America to Venezuela
- Warszewiczia Klotzsch (8 sp.) - Tropical America
- Wittmackanthus Kuntze (1 sp.) - Panama to Southern Tropical America

Synonyms

- Arariba Mart. = Simira
- Blandibractea Wernham = Simira
- Calderonia Standl. = Simira
- Carmenocania Wernham = Pogonopus
- Chrysoxylon Wedd. = Pogonopus
- Creaghia Scort. = Mussaendopsis
- Dorisia Gillespie = Mastixiodendron
- Eukylista Benth. & Hook.f. = Calycophyllum
- Eukylista Benth. = Calycophyllum
- Exandra Standl. = Simira
- Henlea H.Karst. = Rustia
- Holtonia Standl. = Simira
- Howardia Klotzsch = Pogonopus
- Lasionema D.Don = Macrocnemum
- Loretoa Standl. = Capirona
- Megaphyllum Spruce ex Baill. = Pentagonia
- Monadelphanthus H.Karst. = Capirona
- Nothophlebia Standl. = Pentagonia
- Pallasia Klotzsch = Wittmackanthus
- Phitopis Hook.f. = Schizocalyx
- Pinknea Pers. = Pinckneya
- Pseudochimarrhis Ducke = Chimarrhis
- Schoenleinia Klotzsch = Bathysa
- Seemannia Hook. = Pentagonia
- Semaphyllanthe L.Andersson = Calycophyllum
- Sickingia Willd. = Simira
- Sprucea Benth. = Simira
- Stomandra Standl. = Rustia
- Striolaria Ducke = Pentagonia
- Tepesia C.F.Gaertn. = Bothriospora
- Tresanthera H.Karst. = Rustia
- Voigtia Klotzsch = Bathysa
- Watsonamra Kuntze = Pentagonia
- Wernhamia S.Moore = Simira
