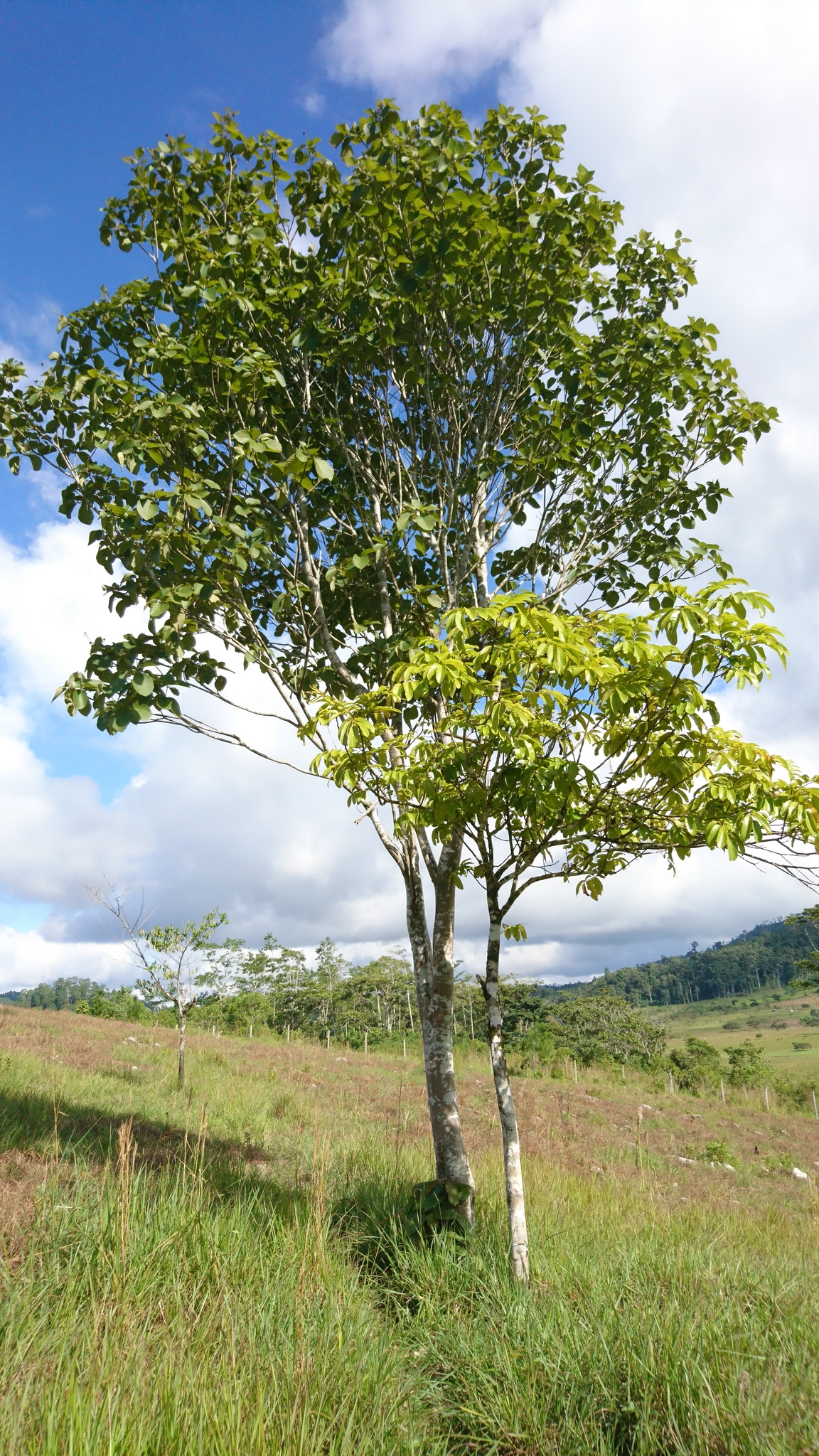
- Simira salvadorensis

Scientific classification
- Kingdom: Plantae
- Clade: Tracheophytes
- Clade: Angiosperms
- Clade: Eudicots
- Clade: Asterids
- Order: Gentianales
- Family: Rubiaceae
- Subfamily: Ixoroideae
- Tribe: Dialypetalantheae
- Genus: Simira; Aubl. (1775)

Species
- 41; see text

Synonyms
- List: Arariba Mart. (1860); Blandibractea Wernham (1917); Calderonia Standl. (1923); Exandra Standl. (1923); Sickingia Willd. (1801); Sprucea Benth. (1853), nom. illeg.; Wernhamia S.Moore (1922)

= Simira =

Genus of plants

Simira is a genus of plants in the family Rubiaceae. The genus was first published by French pharmacist and botanist Jean Baptiste Christophore Fusée Aublet in Hist. Pl. Guiane vol.1 on page 170 in 1775.

The genus is native to Mexico and in southern tropical America.

Secondary metabolites have been isolated from various species in this genus.

== Species ==
It contains the following species:

- Simira alba (Mart.) Delprete, Margalho & Groppo
- Simira aristeguietae (Steyerm.) Steyerm.
- Simira cesariana C.M.Taylor
- Simira colorata B.Ståhl & C.H.Perss.
- Simira cordifolia (Hook.f.) Steyerm.
- Simira corumbensis (Standl.) Steyerm.
- Simira ecuadorensis (Standl.) Steyerm.
- Simira eliezeriana Peixoto
- Simira erythroxylon (Willd.) Bremek.
- Simira fragrans (Rusby) Steyerm.
- Simira gardneriana M.R.V.Barbosa & Peixoto
- Simira grazielae Peixoto
- Simira hadrantha (Standl.) Steyerm.
- Simira hatschbachiorum J.H.Kirkbr.
- Simira hexandra (S.Moore) Steyerm.
- Simira hirsuta C.M.Taylor
- Simira ignicola Steyerm.
- Simira klugei (Standl.) Steyerm.
- Simira lezamae Steyerm.
- Simira longifolia (Willd.) Bremek.
- Simira macrocrater (K.Schum.) Steyerm.
- Simira maxonii (Standl.) Steyerm.
- Simira mexicana (Bullock) Steyerm.
- Simira mollis (Standl.) Steyerm.
- Simira panamensis (Dwyer) C.M.Taylor
- Simira paraensis (Baill.) Steyerm.
- Simira paraguayensis (Standl.) Steyerm.
- Simira pikia (K.Schum.) Steyerm.
- Simira pilosa M.R.V.Barbosa & Peixoto
- Simira podocarpa (Benth.) I.M.Turner
- Simira rhodoclada (Standl.) Steyerm.
- Simira robusta Margalho, G.S.Siqueira & Groppo
- Simira rubescens (Benth.) Bremek. ex Steyerm.
- Simira rubra (Mart.) Steyerm.
- Simira salvadorensis (Standl.) Steyerm.
- Simira sampaioana (Standl.) Steyerm.
- Simira standleyi (Little) Steyerm.
- Simira tinctoria Aubl.
- Simira walteri Silva Neto & Callado
- Simira williamsii (Standl.) Steyerm.
- Simira wurdackii Steyerm.

=== Formerly placed here ===
- Holtonia microcarpa (Ruiz & Pav.) C.M.Taylor (as Simira goudotii (Baill.) Steyerm. and Simira myriantha (Standl.) Steyerm.)
