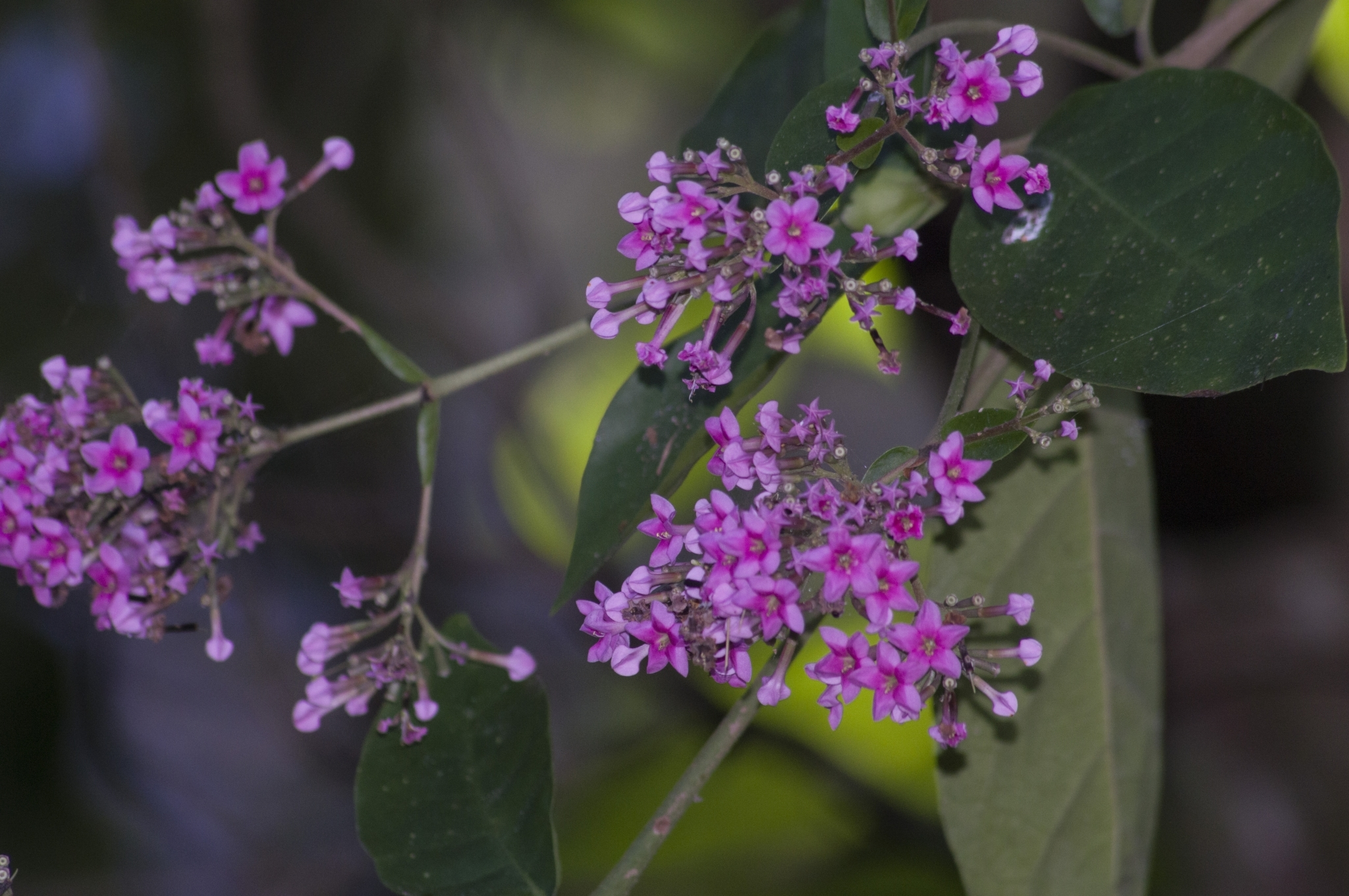

Scientific classification
- Kingdom: Plantae
- Clade: Tracheophytes
- Clade: Angiosperms
- Clade: Eudicots
- Clade: Asterids
- Order: Gentianales
- Family: Rubiaceae
- Subfamily: Ixoroideae
- Tribe: Dialypetalantheae
- Genus: Macrocnemum; P.Browne

= Macrocnemum =

Genus of plants

Macrocnemum is a genus of plant in the family Rubiaceae. It contains the following species (but this list may be incomplete):

- Macrocnemum cinchonoides (Wedd.) Wedd.
- Macrocnemum jamaicense L.
- Macrocnemum pilosinervium Standl.
