= Bathysa =

Scientific classification
- Kingdom: Plantae
- Clade: Tracheophytes
- Clade: Angiosperms
- Clade: Eudicots
- Clade: Asterids
- Order: Gentianales
- Family: Rubiaceae
- Subfamily: Ixoroideae
- Tribe: Dialypetalantheae
- Genus: Bathysa; C.Presl

Type species
- Bathysa stipulata (Vell.) C.Presl

Synonyms
- Schoenleinia Klotzsch; Voigtia Klotzsch

Genus of plants

Bathysa is a genus of flowering plants in the family Rubiaceae. It was described by Carl Borivoj Presl in 1845. The genus is found from Venezuela south to Brazil and Bolivia.

== Species ==
Species currently (April 2014) accepted:

- Bathysa australis (A.St.-Hil.) K.Schum. - Bolivia, Brazil
- Bathysa bathysoides (Steyerm.) Delprete - Venezuela, Bolivia, Colombia, Perú, Brazil
- Bathysa gymnocarpa K.Schum. - Brazil (States of Rio de Janeiro, São Paulo)
- Bathysa mendoncae K.Schum. - Brazil
- Bathysa multiflora L.O.Williams - Perú
- Bathysa nicholsonii K.Schum. - Brazil
- Bathysa perijaensis (Steyerm.) Delprete - Venezuela
- Bathysa pittieri (Standl.) Steyerm. - Venezuela
- Bathysa stipulata (Vell.) C.Presl - Brazil
- Bathysa sylvestrae Germano-Filho & M.Gomes - Brazil (State of Rio de Janeiro)
