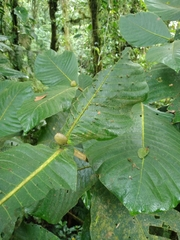
- Elaeagia auriculata

Scientific classification
- Kingdom: Plantae
- Clade: Tracheophytes
- Clade: Angiosperms
- Clade: Eudicots
- Clade: Asterids
- Order: Gentianales
- Family: Rubiaceae
- Subfamily: Ixoroideae
- Tribe: Dialypetalantheae
- Genus: Elaeagia; Wedd.

= Elaeagia =

Genus of plants

Elaeagia is a genus of flowering plants in the family Rubiaceae. The genus is found from Mexico to tropical America.

== Species ==
- Elaeagia alterniramosa Steyerm.
- Elaeagia arborea D.A.Simpson
- Elaeagia asperula Standl. ex Steyerm.
- Elaeagia auriculata Hemsl.
- Elaeagia barbata Steyerm.
- Elaeagia chiriquina C.M.Taylor
- Elaeagia cuatrecasasii Steyerm.
- Elaeagia cubensis Britton
- Elaeagia ecuadorensis Steyerm.
- Elaeagia glossostipula C.M.Taylor
- Elaeagia grandis (Rusby) Rusby
- Elaeagia karstenii Standl.
- Elaeagia laxiflora Standl. & Steyerm.
- Elaeagia magniflora Steyerm.
- Elaeagia maguirei Standl.
- Elaeagia mariae Wedd.
- Elaeagia microcarpa Steyerm.
- Elaeagia mollis Rusby
- Elaeagia multinervia Steyerm.
- Elaeagia myriantha (Standl.) C.M.Taylor
- Elaeagia nitidifolia Dwyer
- Elaeagia obovata Rusby
- Elaeagia pastoensis L.E.Mora
- Elaeagia ruizteranii Steyerm.
- Elaeagia utilis (Goudot) Wedd.
