= Euosmia =

Euosmia may refer to:

- an obsolete genus of flowering plants, whose species are now recognised as belonging to either Hoffmannia or Bothriospora
- a type of the smell disorder parosmia characterised by a pleasant smell sensation
- a rare term for a normal sensation of smell

== See also ==
- Eucosma, a genus of moths
