= Pogonopus =

Pogonopus may refer to:

- Pogonopus (beetle), a genus of beetles in the family Cetoniidae
- Pogonopus (plant), a genus of plants in the family Rubiaceae
