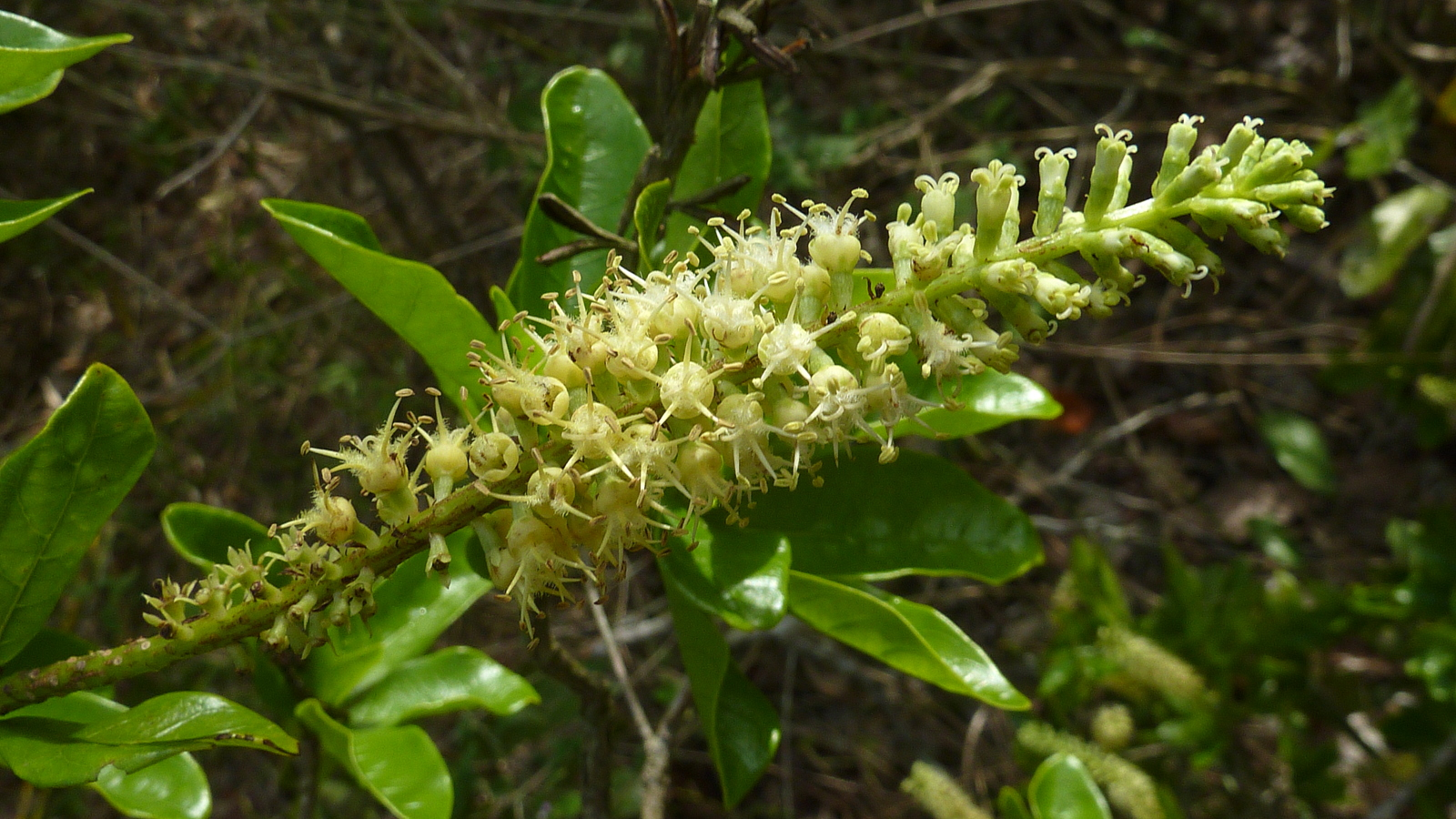
- Alseis floribunda

Scientific classification
- Kingdom: Plantae
- Clade: Embryophytes
- Clade: Tracheophytes
- Clade: Spermatophytes
- Clade: Angiosperms
- Clade: Eudicots
- Clade: Asterids
- Order: Gentianales
- Family: Rubiaceae
- Subfamily: Ixoroideae
- Tribe: Dialypetalantheae
- Genus: Alseis; Schott

Type species
- Alseis floribunda Schott

= Alseis =

Genus of plants

Alseis is a genus of flowering plants in the family Rubiaceae. It was described by Heinrich Wilhelm Schott in 1827. The genus is native to tropical Latin America from southern Mexico to Brazil.

== Species ==
- Alseis blackiana Hemsl. - Panamá, Colombia
- Alseis costaricensis C.M.Taylor - Costa Rica
- Alseis eggersii Standl. - Ecuador, Perú
- Alseis floribunda Schott - Bolivia, Brazil
- Alseis gardneri Wernham - Rio de Janeiro (state)
- Alseis hondurensis Standl. - Chiapas, Guatemala, Belize, Honduras
- Alseis involuta K.Schum. - Brazil
- Alseis labatioides H.Karst. ex K.Schum. - Colombia, Venezuela, Guyana
- Alseis latifolia Gleason - Maranhão
- Alseis longifolia Ducke - Guyana, Suriname, Brazil
- Alseis lugonis L.Andersson - Ecuador
- Alseis microcarpa Standl. & Steyerm. - Venezuela, Colombia, Perú
- Alseis mutisii Moldenke - Colombia, Venezuela
- Alseis peruviana Standl. - Ecuador, Peru
- Alseis pickelii Pilg. & Schmale - Brazil
- Alseis reticulata Pilg. & Schmale - Amazonas (state of Brazil) and Bolivia
- Alseis smithii Standl. - Guyana
- Alseis yucatanensis Standl. - Belize, Guatemala, Campeche, Quintana Roo, Tabasco, Chiapas, Yucatán
