= Schizocalyx (disambiguation) =

Schizocalyx may refer to:

- Schizocalyx, a genus of plants in the family Rubiaceae
- Schizocalyx, a genus of plants in the family Myrtaceae, synonym of Eugenia
- Schizocalyx, a genus of plants in the family Salvadoraceae, synonym of Dobera
