= Dolichodelphys =

Conservation status
- Least Concern (IUCN 3.1)

Scientific classification
- Kingdom: Plantae
- Clade: Tracheophytes
- Clade: Angiosperms
- Clade: Eudicots
- Clade: Asterids
- Order: Gentianales
- Family: Rubiaceae
- Subfamily: Ixoroideae
- Tribe: Dialypetalantheae
- Genus: Dolichodelphys; K.Schum. & K.Krause
- Species: D. chlorocrater

Binomial name
- Dolichodelphys chlorocrater K.Schum. & K.Krause

Synonyms
- Rustia longifolia Standl.

Species of plant

Dolichodelphys is a monotypic genus of flowering plants in the family Rubiaceae. The genus contains only one species, Dolichodelphys chlorocrater, which is found in Venezuela, Colombia, Ecuador, and Peru.
