= Capirona =

Scientific classification
- Kingdom: Plantae
- Clade: Tracheophytes
- Clade: Angiosperms
- Clade: Eudicots
- Clade: Asterids
- Order: Gentianales
- Family: Rubiaceae
- Subfamily: Ixoroideae
- Tribe: Dialypetalantheae
- Genus: Capirona; Spruce
- Species: C. decorticans

Binomial name
- Capirona decorticans Spruce

Synonyms
- Capirona boiviniana Baill.; Capirona duckei Huber; Capirona huberiana Ducke; Capirona leiophloea Benoist; Capirona surinamensis Bremek.; Capirona wurdackii Steyerm.; Condaminea macrophylla Poepp.; Loretoa peruviana Standl.; Monadelphanthus floridus H.Karst.

Genus of plants

Capirona is a monotypic genus of flowering plants in the family Rubiaceae. The genus contains only one species, viz. Capirona decorticans, which is native to northern South America. It has been reported from French Guiana, Guyana, Suriname, Venezuela, Colombia, Ecuador, Peru, and northern Brazil.
