= Dioicodendron =

Scientific classification
- Kingdom: Plantae
- Clade: Tracheophytes
- Clade: Angiosperms
- Clade: Eudicots
- Clade: Asterids
- Order: Gentianales
- Family: Rubiaceae
- Subfamily: Ixoroideae
- Tribe: Dialypetalantheae
- Genus: Dioicodendron; Steyerm.
- Species: D. dioicum

Binomial name
- Dioicodendron dioicum (K.Schum. & K.Krause) Steyerm.

Synonyms
- Chimarrhis dioica K.Schum. & K.Krause; Chimarrhis venezuelensis Standl. & Steyerm.; Dioicodendron cuatrecasasii Steyerm.

Genus of plants

Dioicodendron is a monotypic genus of flowering plants in the family Rubiaceae. The genus contains only one species, viz. Dioicodendron dioicum, which is found from western South America to northwestern Venezuela.

Some authors recognize a second species, Dioicodendron cuatrecasasii.
