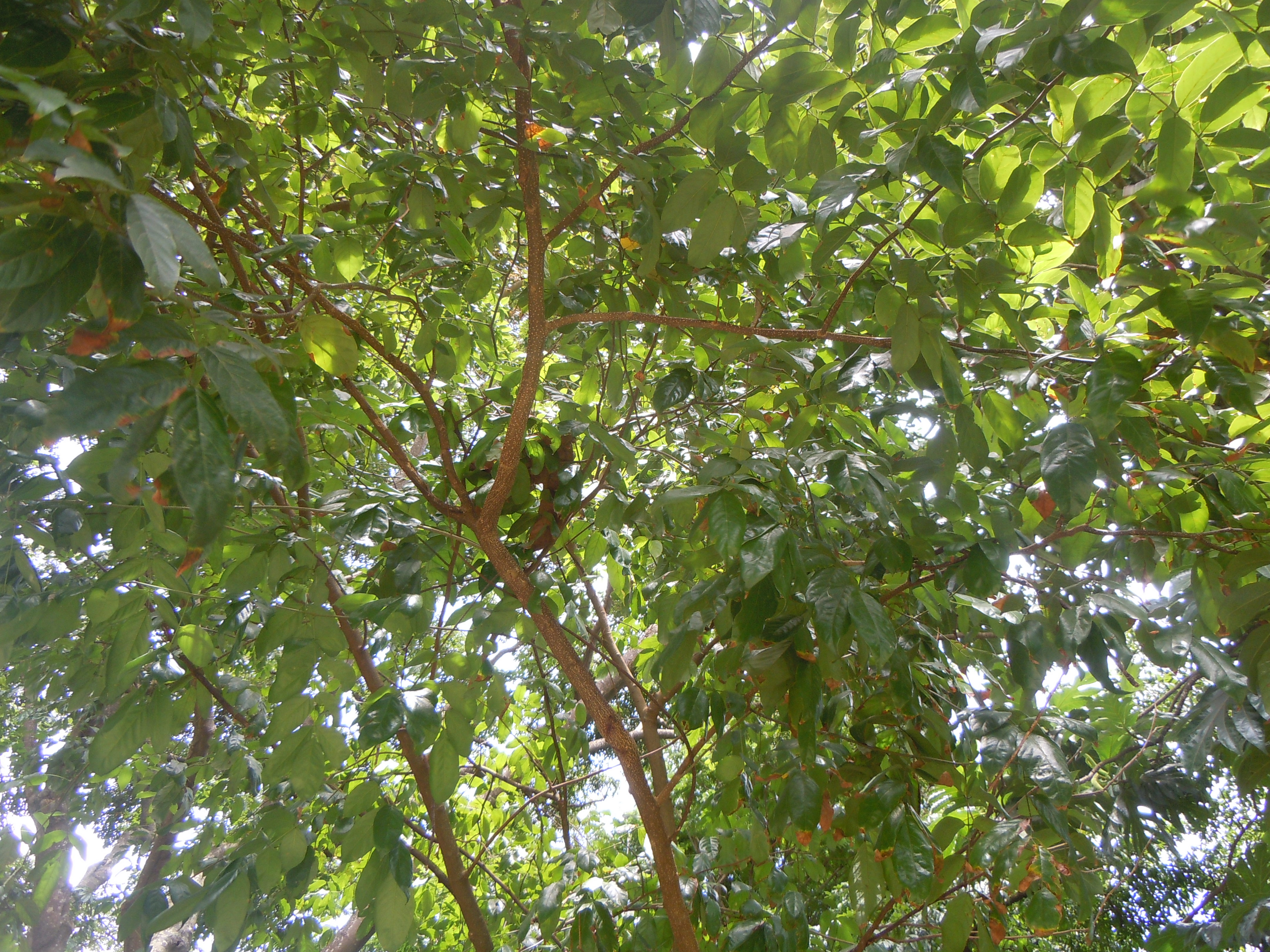
- Chimarrhis cymosa

Scientific classification
- Kingdom: Plantae
- Clade: Tracheophytes
- Clade: Angiosperms
- Clade: Eudicots
- Clade: Asterids
- Order: Gentianales
- Family: Rubiaceae
- Subfamily: Ixoroideae
- Tribe: Dialypetalantheae
- Genus: Chimarrhis; Jacq.

Type species
- Chimarrhis cymosa Jacq.

Synonyms
- Pseudochimarrhis Ducke

= Chimarrhis =

Genus of plants

Chimarrhis is a genus of flowering plants in the family Rubiaceae. It has 15 recognized species, native to Central America, South America and the West Indies.

== Species ==
- Chimarrhis barbata (Ducke) Bremek.
- Chimarrhis brevipes Steyerm.
- Chimarrhis cubensis Steyerm.
- Chimarrhis cymosa Jacq.
- Chimarrhis duckeana Delprete
- Chimarrhis ekmanii Borhidi
- Chimarrhis gentryana Delprete
- Chimarrhis glabriflora Ducke
- Chimarrhis hookeri K.Schum.
- Chimarrhis jamaicensis (Urb.) Steyerm.
- Chimarrhis latifolia Standl.
- Chimarrhis microcarpa Standl.
- Chimarrhis parviflora Standl.
- Chimarrhis speciosa (Steyerm.) Delprete
- Chimarrhis turbinata DC.
