= Pentagonia (disambiguation) =

Pentagonia is a series of five novels by Cuban author Reinaldo Arenas

Pentagonia may also refer to:

- Pentagonia (amoeba), a genus of amoeba in the order Arcellinida
- Pentagonia (brachiopod), a genus of brachiopods in the family Meristellidae
- Pentagonia (plant), a genus of plants in the family Rubiaceae
