= Macbrideina =

Scientific classification
- Kingdom: Plantae
- Clade: Tracheophytes
- Clade: Angiosperms
- Clade: Eudicots
- Clade: Asterids
- Order: Gentianales
- Family: Rubiaceae
- Subfamily: Ixoroideae
- Tribe: Dialypetalantheae
- Genus: Macbrideina; Standl.

Species of plants

Macbrideina is a monotypic genus of flowering plants belonging to the family Rubiaceae. It only contains one known species, Macbrideina peruviana Standl.

Its native range is western South America and is found in the countries of Bolivia, Colombia, Ecuador and Peru.

The genus name of Macbrideina is in honour of James Francis Macbride (1892–1976), an American botanist who devoted most of his professional life to the study of the flora of Peru. The Latin specific epithet of peruviana means "coming from Peru". Both genus and species were first described and published in Trop. Woods Vol.20 on pages 24-25 in 1929.
