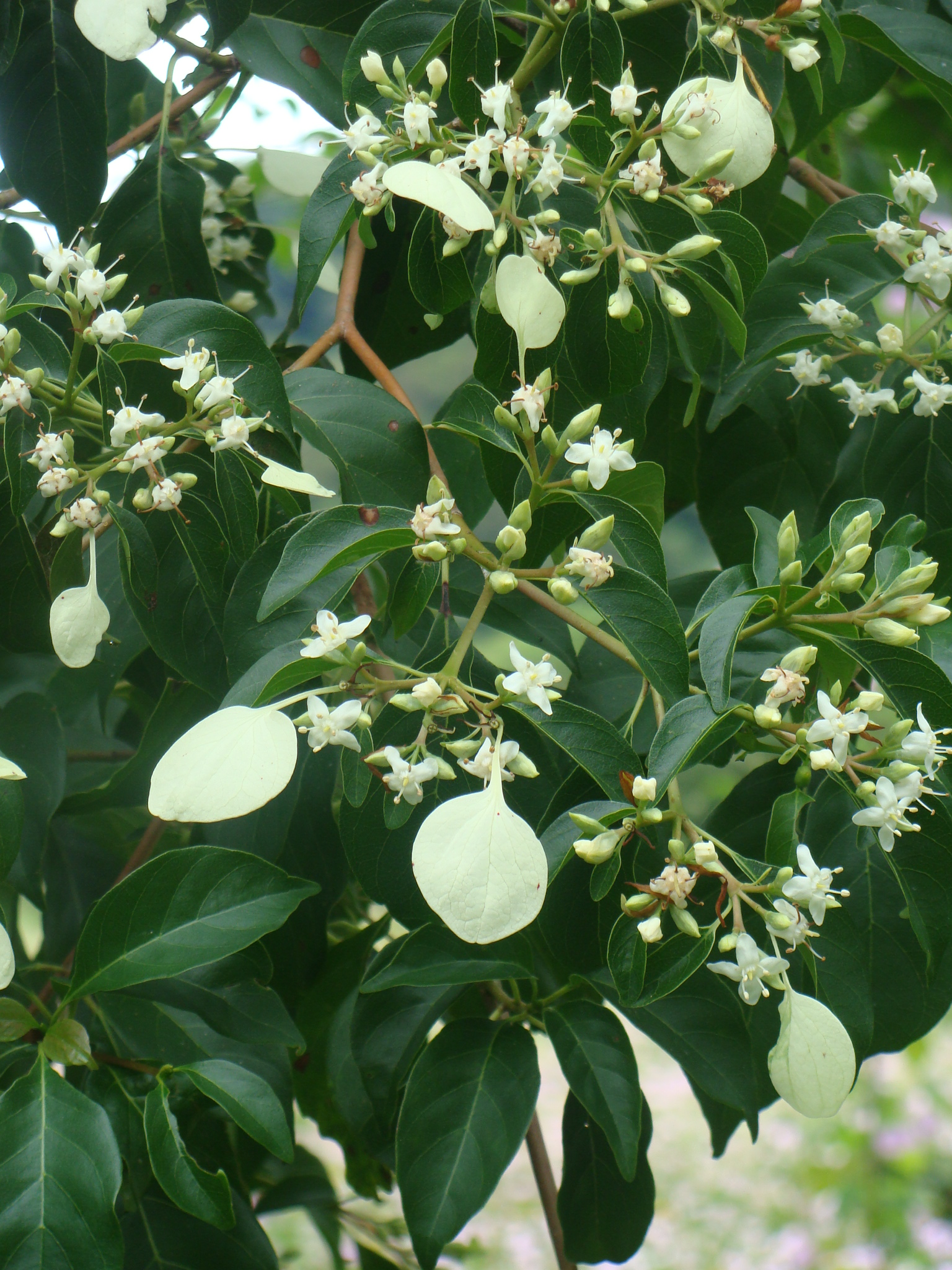
- Calycophyllum candidissimum foliage and flowers

Scientific classification
- Kingdom: Plantae
- Clade: Embryophytes
- Clade: Tracheophytes
- Clade: Spermatophytes
- Clade: Angiosperms
- Clade: Eudicots
- Clade: Asterids
- Order: Gentianales
- Family: Rubiaceae
- Subfamily: Ixoroideae
- Tribe: Dialypetalantheae
- Genus: Calycophyllum; DC.

Type species
- Calycophyllum candidissimum (Vahl) DC.

Synonyms
- Eukylista Benth.; Eukylista Benth. & Hook.f.; Semaphyllanthe L.Andersson

= Calycophyllum =

Genus of plants

Calycophyllum is a genus of flowering plants in the family Rubiaceae. It was described by Augustin Pyramus de Candolle in 1830. The genus is found from Mexico, Central America, South America and the West Indies.

== Species ==
- Calycophyllum candidissimum (Vahl) DC. common names: lemonwood, digame lancewood - Mexico (Campeche, Chiapas, Oaxaca, Veracruz), Belize, Central America, Cuba, Trinidad, Venezuela, Colombia
- Calycophyllum intonsum Steyerm. - Venezuela, Guyana, Brazil
- Calycophyllum megistocaulum (K.Krause) C.M.Taylor - Bolivia, Colombia, Ecuador, Peru, Brazil
- Calycophyllum merumense Steyerm. - Guyana
- Calycophyllum multiflorum Griseb. - Bolivia, Brazil, Argentina, Paraguay
- Calycophyllum obovatum (Ducke) Ducke - Guyana, Venezuela, Colombia, Brazil
- Calycophyllum papillosum J.H.Kirkbr. - Brazil (Espírito Santo)
- Calycophyllum spectabile Steyerm. - Guyana
- Calycophyllum spruceanum (Benth.) Hook.f. ex K.Schum. - Bolivia, Colombia, Ecuador, Peru, Brazil
- Calycophyllum tefense J.H.Kirkbr. - Brazil (Amazonas)
- Calycophyllum venezuelense Steyerm. - Venezuela, Guyana
