= Ludwig Wittmack =

German botanist (1839–1929)

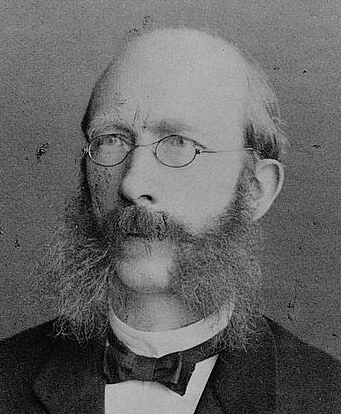
- Born: Carl Ludwig Max Wittmack; 26 September 1839; Hamburg, Kingdom of Prussia
- Died: 2 February 1929 (aged 89); Berlin, Weimar Republic
- Education: Humboldt University of Berlin; University of Göttingen
- Scientific career
- Fields: Botany

Carl Ludwig Max Wittmack (26 September 1839 in Hamburg – 2 February 1929 in Berlin) was a German botanist.

== Biography ==
Wittmack studied botany at the University of Jena (1864) and at the University of Berlin (1865). He received his doctorate degree in 1867 with a dissertation on the banana, Musa Ensete, from the University of Göttingen.

In the same year, he worked as curator at the Agricultural Museum in Berlin, where he managed plant breeding. In 1874, he became affiliated with the University of Berlin. He was professor of Botany at the Agricultural College in Berlin (1880-1913), professor of botany at the University of Veterinary Medicine in Berlin (1880-1920), director of the Experiment Station of the Association of German Müller (1875-1905), a member of the department for seed cultivation in the German Agricultural Society (1883-1924), and Director of the Agricultural Institute (1889-91 and 1910-13). He held numerous honorary positions. Wittmack authored many botanical writings, as well as agricultural pieces. From 1887, he was editor of the magazine Gartenflora, founded in 1852 by the German botanist Eduard August von Regel.

The plant genus of Wittmackia Mez, from South America, in the family of bromeliads (Bromeliaceae) was named in his honor, as well as the plant genus of Wittmackanthus which is a monotypic genus of flowering plants in the family Rubiaceae.
