= Pentagonia gomez-lauritoi =

Scientific classification
- Kingdom: Plantae
- Clade: Tracheophytes
- Clade: Angiosperms
- Clade: Eudicots
- Clade: Asterids
- Order: Gentianales
- Family: Rubiaceae
- Genus: Pentagonia
- Species: P. gomez-lauritoi

Binomial name
- Pentagonia gomez-lauritoi Hammel

Species of plant

Pentagonia gomez-loritoi is a "palmoid" or "Corner Model Tree" of the Costa Rican and Panamanian rainforest belonging to the family Rubiaceae. It is usually single-trunked (but occasionally branching low into several reiterations ) up to 6 m (20 ft) in height. It is most noteworthy for its pairs of huge, entire margined, shiny oblanceolate leaves; each leaf up to 140 cm (55 in) in length by up to 56 cm (22 in) in width. petiole very short or none. The pairs of leaves are spaced several inches apart along the stem. This species was totally unknown prior to 2014.

The plant was described in 2015 by Barry Edward Hammel. The type specimen was collected near Oeste de Volio in Costa Rica by J. Gómez-Laurito & G. Vargas in 1990.
