= Mastixiodendron stoddardii =

Conservation status
- Vulnerable (IUCN 2.3)

Scientific classification
- Kingdom: Plantae
- Clade: Tracheophytes
- Clade: Angiosperms
- Clade: Eudicots
- Clade: Asterids
- Order: Gentianales
- Family: Rubiaceae
- Genus: Mastixiodendron
- Species: M. stoddardii

Binomial name
- Mastixiodendron stoddardii Merr. & Perry

Species of plant

Mastixiodendron stoddardii is a species of plant in the family Rubiaceae. It is found in Papua New Guinea and the Solomon Islands. It is threatened by habitat loss.
