= Rustia occidentalis =

Scientific classification
- Kingdom: Plantae
- Clade: Tracheophytes
- Clade: Angiosperms
- Clade: Eudicots
- Clade: Asterids
- Order: Gentianales
- Family: Rubiaceae
- Genus: Rustia
- Species: R. occidentalis

Binomial name
- Rustia occidentalis (Benth.) Hemsl.

Species of plant

Rustia occidentalis is a species of flowering plant in the family Rubiaceae, native to Central America (Costa Rica, the Central American Pacific Islands, Guatemala, Nicaragua and Panama), as well as to Colombia and Ecuador in western South America. It was first described by George Bentham in 1845 as Exostema occidentale and transferred to Rustia in 1881 by William Hemsley.
