= Hippotis =

Scientific classification
- Kingdom: Plantae
- Clade: Tracheophytes
- Clade: Angiosperms
- Clade: Eudicots
- Clade: Asterids
- Order: Gentianales
- Family: Rubiaceae
- Subfamily: Ixoroideae
- Tribe: Dialypetalantheae
- Genus: Hippotis; Ruiz & Pav.

Genus of plants

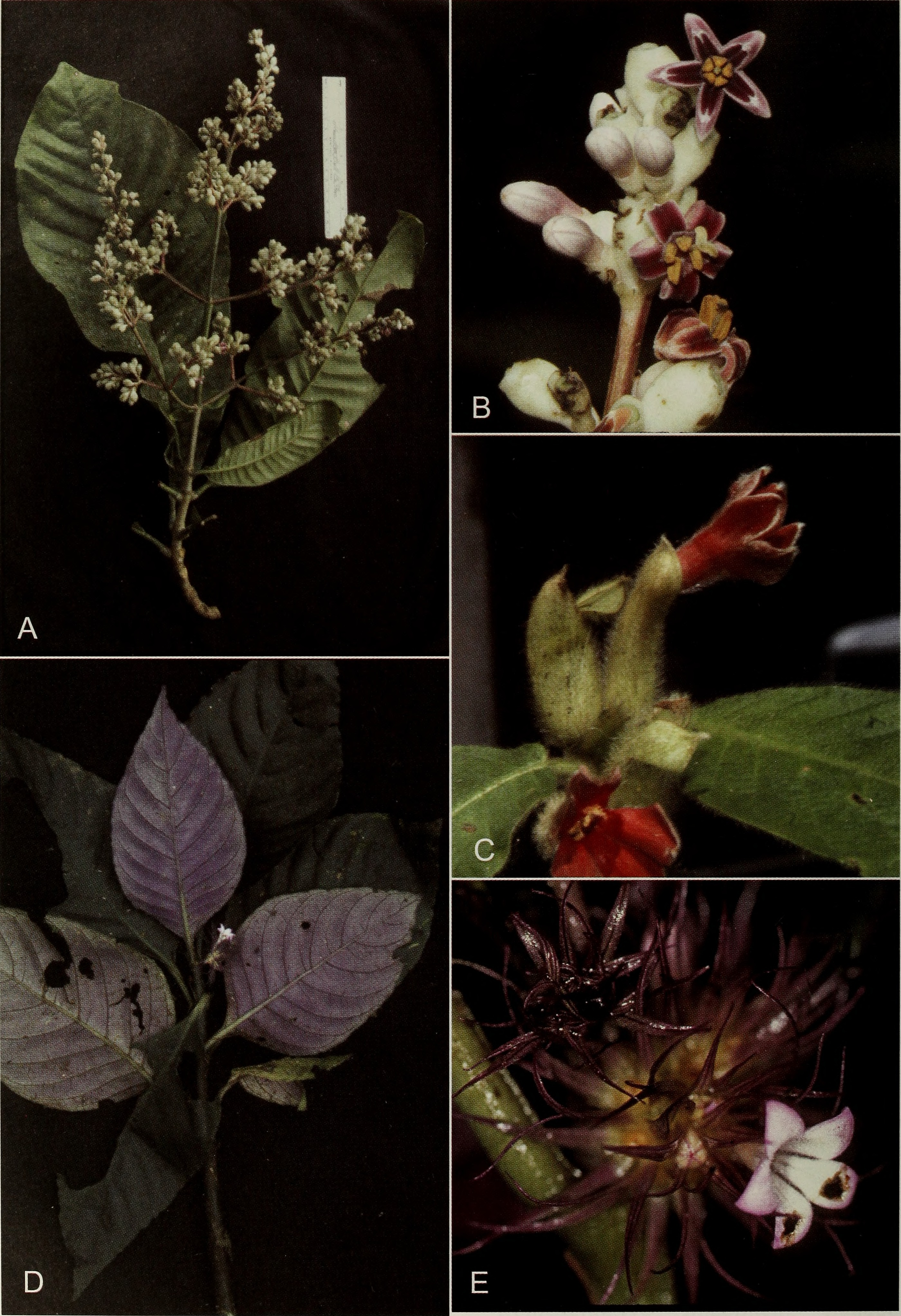
Figure C depicts a flower of Hippotis comosa

Hippotis is a genus of flowering plants belonging to the family Rubiaceae.

Its native range is Central and Southern Tropical America.

Species:

- Hippotis albiflora H.Karst.
- Hippotis antioquiana C.M.Taylor
- Hippotis brevipes Spruce ex K.Schum.
- Hippotis brevistipula Calderón Cruz
- Hippotis comosa L.Andersson & Rova
- Hippotis ecuatoriana C.M.Taylor
- Hippotis elegantula C.M.Taylor & Calderón Cruz
- Hippotis grandiflora Steyerm.
- Hippotis hirsutissima Calderón Cruz & C.M.Taylor
- Hippotis lasseri Steyerm.
- Hippotis mollis Standl.
- Hippotis panamensis (Dwyer) C.M.Taylor
- Hippotis peruviana H.Karst.
- Hippotis stellata C.M.Taylor & Rova
- Hippotis subelongata Steyerm.
- Hippotis triflora Ruiz & Pav.
- Hippotis tubiflora Spruce ex K.Schum.
- Hippotis vasqueziana C.M.Taylor
