= Holtonia =

Scientific classification
- Kingdom: Plantae
- Clade: Tracheophytes
- Clade: Angiosperms
- Clade: Eudicots
- Clade: Asterids
- Order: Gentianales
- Family: Rubiaceae
- Genus: Holtonia; Standl. (1832)
- Species: H. microcarpa

Binomial name
- Holtonia microcarpa (Ruiz & Pav.) C.M.Taylor (2023)

Synonyms
- Chimarrhis goudotii Baill. (1879); Condaminea microcarpa (Ruiz & Pav.) DC. (1830); Deppea panamensis Dwyer (1980); Elaeagia myriantha (Standl.) C.M.Taylor & Hammel (1993); Holtonia myriantha (Standl.) Standl. (1932); Macrocnemum microcarpum Ruiz & Pav. (1799) (basionym); Sickingia goudotii (Baill.) Standl. (1930); Sickingia myriantha Standl. (1930); Simira goudotii (Baill.) Steyerm. (1972); Simira myriantha (Standl.) Steyerm. (1972)

Genus of flowering plants

Holtonia microcarpa is a species of flowering plant in the family Rubiaceae. It is the sole species in genus Holtonia. It is a tree native to the tropical Americas, ranging from Costa Rica and Panama to Venezuela, Colombia, Ecuador, Peru, and Bolivia.
