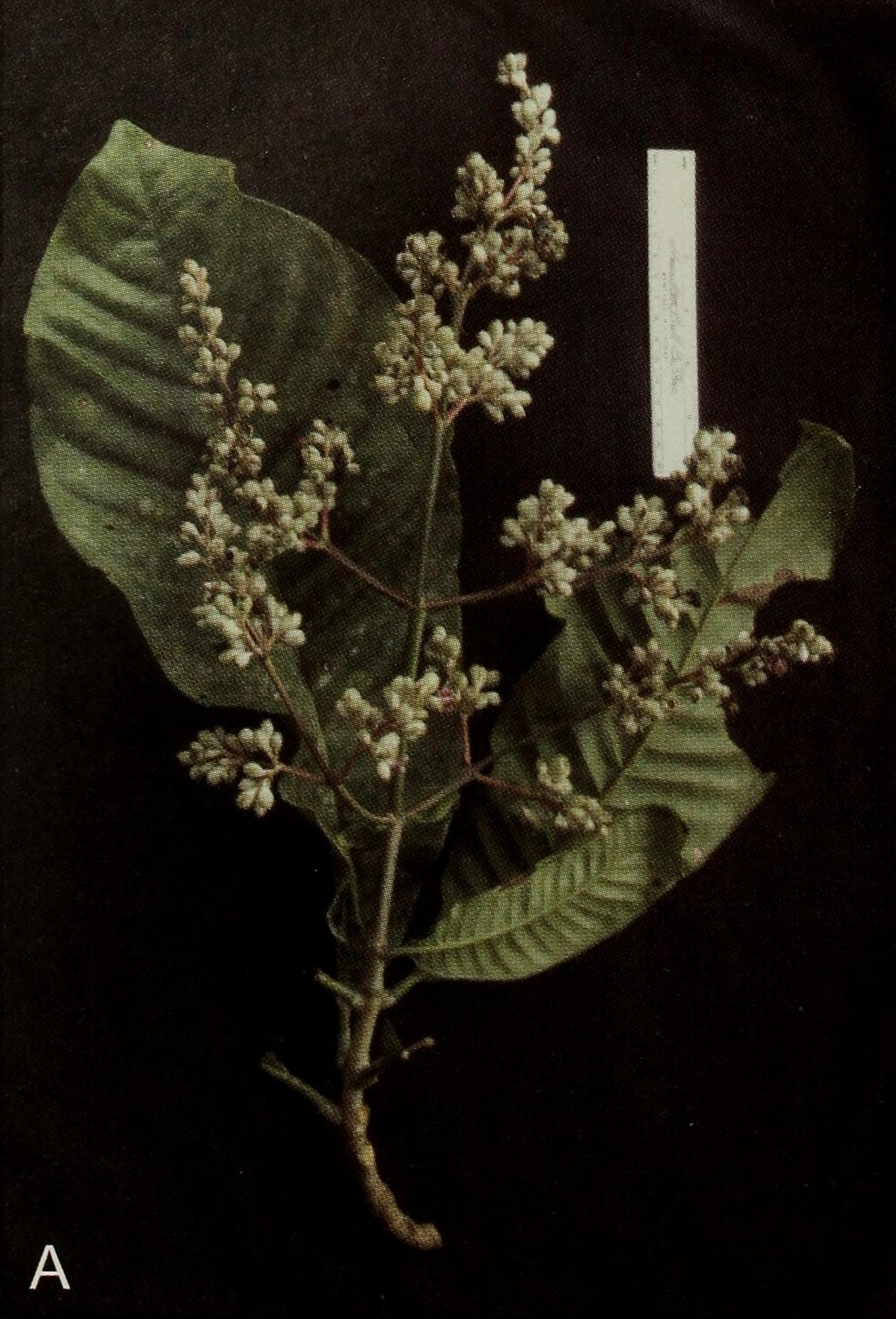
- Rustia bilsana

Scientific classification
- Kingdom: Plantae
- Clade: Tracheophytes
- Clade: Angiosperms
- Clade: Eudicots
- Clade: Asterids
- Order: Gentianales
- Family: Rubiaceae
- Subfamily: Ixoroideae
- Tribe: Dialypetalantheae
- Genus: Rustia; Klotzsch (1846)

Synonyms
- Henlea H.Karst. (1859); Stomandra Standl. (1947); Tresanthera H.Karst. (1859)

= Rustia (plant) =

Genus of plants

Rustia is a genus of flowering plants in the family Rubiaceae. There are 17 species distributed in tropical Central and South America. They are shrubs and trees up to 15 metres (49 ft) tall.

Species include:

- Rustia alba Delprete
- Rustia angustifolia K.Schum.
- Rustia bilsana Delprete
- Rustia condamineoides (H.Karst.) Kainul. & B.Bremer
- Rustia costaricensis (Standl.) Lorence
- Rustia dressleri Delprete
- Rustia formosa (Cham. & Schltdl. ex DC.) Klotzsch
- Rustia gracilis K.Schum.
- Rustia haitiensis Urb.
- Rustia kosnipatana S.Will & C.M.Taylor
- Rustia occidentalis (Benth.) Hemsl.
- Rustia rubra Standl. ex D.A.Simpson
- Rustia schunkeana Delprete
- Rustia simpsonii Delprete
- Rustia thibaudioides (H.Karst.) Delprete
- Rustia venezuelensis Standl. & Steyerm.
- Rustia viridiflora Delprete
