= Simira standleyi =

Conservation status
- Critically Endangered (IUCN 3.1)

Scientific classification
- Kingdom: Plantae
- Clade: Tracheophytes
- Clade: Angiosperms
- Clade: Eudicots
- Clade: Asterids
- Order: Gentianales
- Family: Rubiaceae
- Genus: Simira
- Species: S. standleyi

Binomial name
- Simira standleyi (Little) Steyerm.

Synonyms
- Sickingia standleyi Little in Phytologia 18: 204 (1969)

Species of plant

Simira standleyi is a species of plant in the family Rubiaceae. It is endemic to the tropical forests of Ecuador.

It was first published by American botanist Julian Alfred Steyermark in Mem. New York Bot. Gard. 23: 309 in 1972, based on an earlier description by Elbert Luther Little in 1989. The specific epithet of standleyi refers to American botanist Paul Carpenter Standley (1884– 1963).
