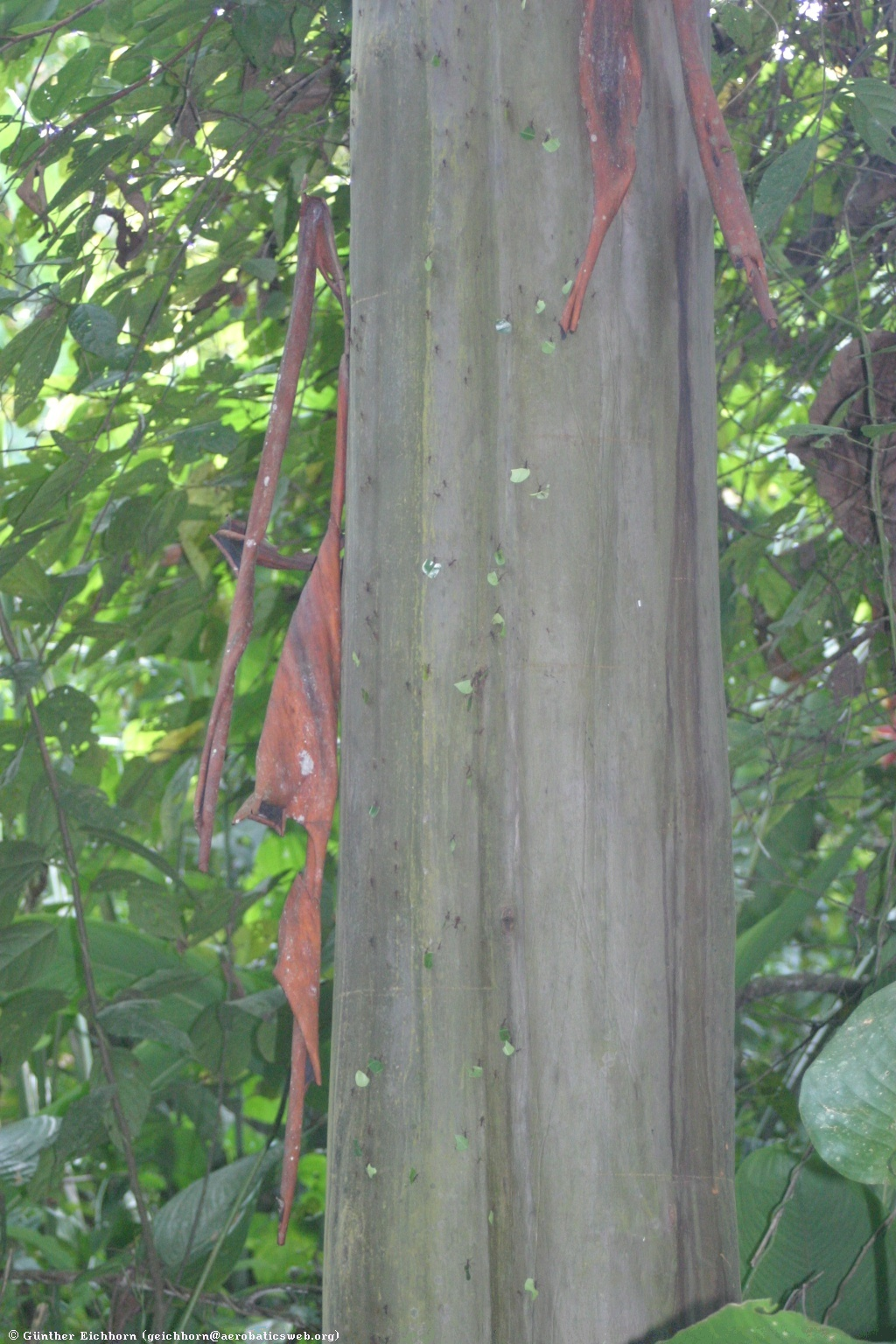
- Calycophyllum spruceanum in the Amazon rainforest of Ecuador

Scientific classification
- Kingdom: Plantae
- Clade: Embryophytes
- Clade: Tracheophytes
- Clade: Spermatophytes
- Clade: Angiosperms
- Clade: Eudicots
- Clade: Asterids
- Order: Gentianales
- Family: Rubiaceae
- Genus: Calycophyllum
- Species: C. spruceanum

Binomial name
- Calycophyllum spruceanum (Benth.) K.Schum.

Synonyms
- Calycophyllum spruceanum f. brasiliensis K.Schum.; Calycophyllum spruceanum f. peruvianum K.Schum.; Eukylista spruceana Benth.

= Calycophyllum spruceanum =

Capirona

Species of tree

Calycophyllum spruceanum, common names capirona and Pau-Mulato, is a canopy tree belonging to the Rubiaceae family indigenous to the Amazon rainforest. Its most interesting characteristic is its very shiny, highly polished green bark. The oblong leaves are up to seven inches (18 centimeters) in length. The white flowers are in small terminal clusters.

== Description ==
A tree can grow to a height of 15–27 meters (49–89 feet). Its flowers are in cymes which are densely packed. At first the inflorescences are totally enclosed by the bracts. When they emerge, the flowers are white and 6–7 millimeters long with spreading lobes. The fruit is an oblong capsule 8–11 millimeters long and densely covered with hairs pressed to the surface.

Once or twice a year, it sheds off its bark entirely. The smooth green bark underneath is somewhat like a sunburnt human. The older the tree, the more of its bark will be unpeeled, creeping up its trunk. It grows white or green flowers between March and April. It fruits between July and November and the seeds are dispersed by the wind and water. Its wood is used for parquet.

== Uses ==
The dried bark is used to treat fungus on the skin. Used also as an antidiabetic and for eye infections. This tree avoids lichens, fungi, epiphytes and lianas, by getting rid of its bark.

The plants grows extremely fast, within eight years. The wood is often cut for lumber.

== Region of growth ==
Calycophyllum spruceanum grows in the South American countries of Bolivia, Colombia, Brazil, Ecuador, and Peru.
