= Chimarrhis hookeri =

Scientific classification
- Kingdom: Plantae
- Clade: Tracheophytes
- Clade: Angiosperms
- Clade: Eudicots
- Clade: Asterids
- Order: Gentianales
- Family: Rubiaceae
- Genus: Chimarrhis
- Species: C. hookeri

Binomial name
- Chimarrhis hookeri K. Schum.

Species of plant

Chimarrhis hookeri is a species of tree in the family Rubiaceae. It is native to South America.
