= Lintersemina =

Scientific classification
- Kingdom: Plantae
- Clade: Tracheophytes
- Clade: Angiosperms
- Clade: Eudicots
- Clade: Asterids
- Order: Gentianales
- Family: Rubiaceae
- Subfamily: Ixoroideae
- Tribe: Dialypetalantheae
- Genus: Lintersemina; Humberto Mend., Celis & M.A.González (2020)
- Species: L. chucuriensis

Binomial name
- Lintersemina chucuriensis Humberto Mend., Celis & M.A.González (2020)

Genus of flowering plants

Lintersemina chucuriensis is a species of flowering plant in the family Rubiaceae. It is the sole species in genus Lintersemina. It is endemic to Colombia.
