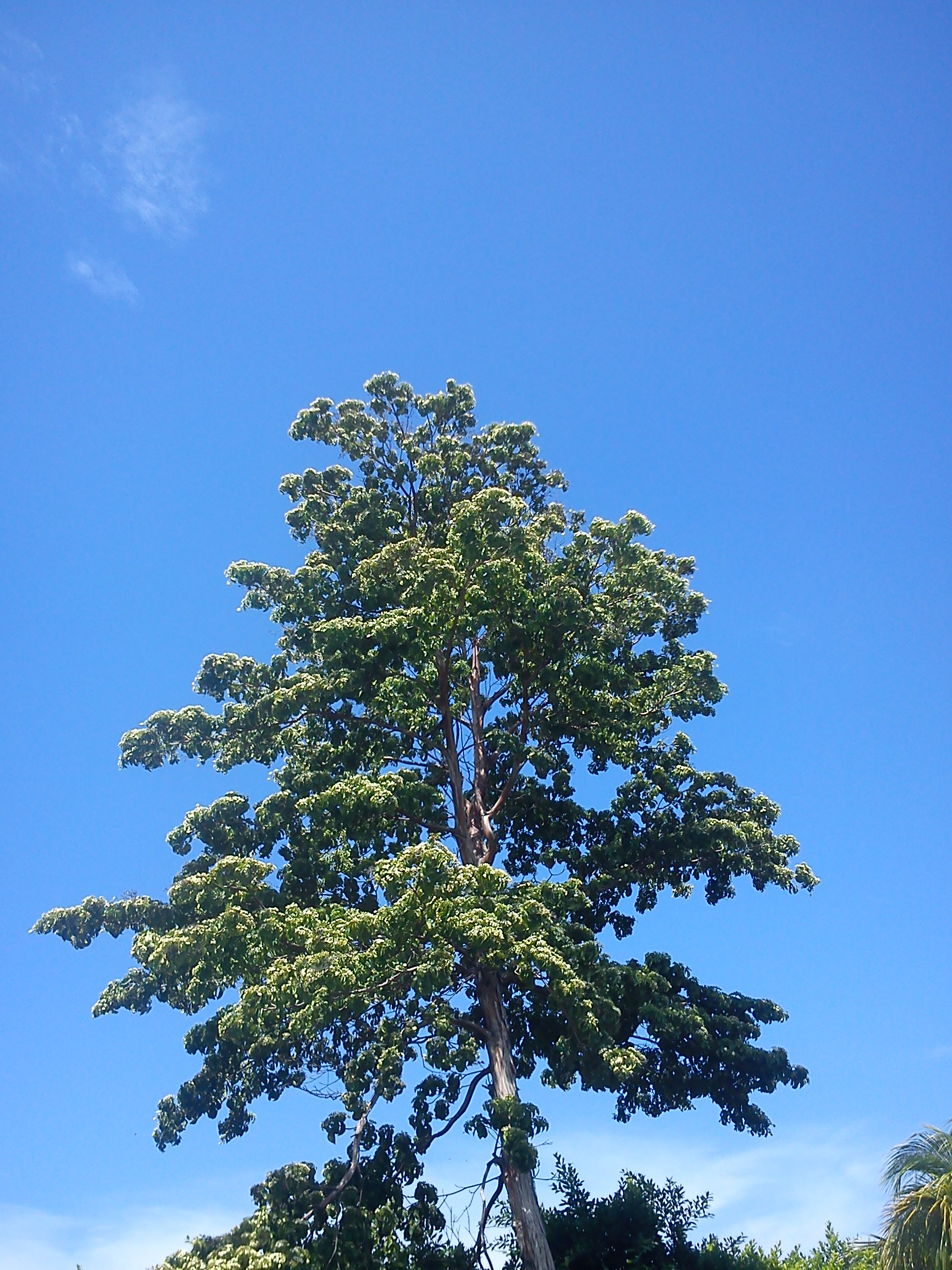
- In Managua
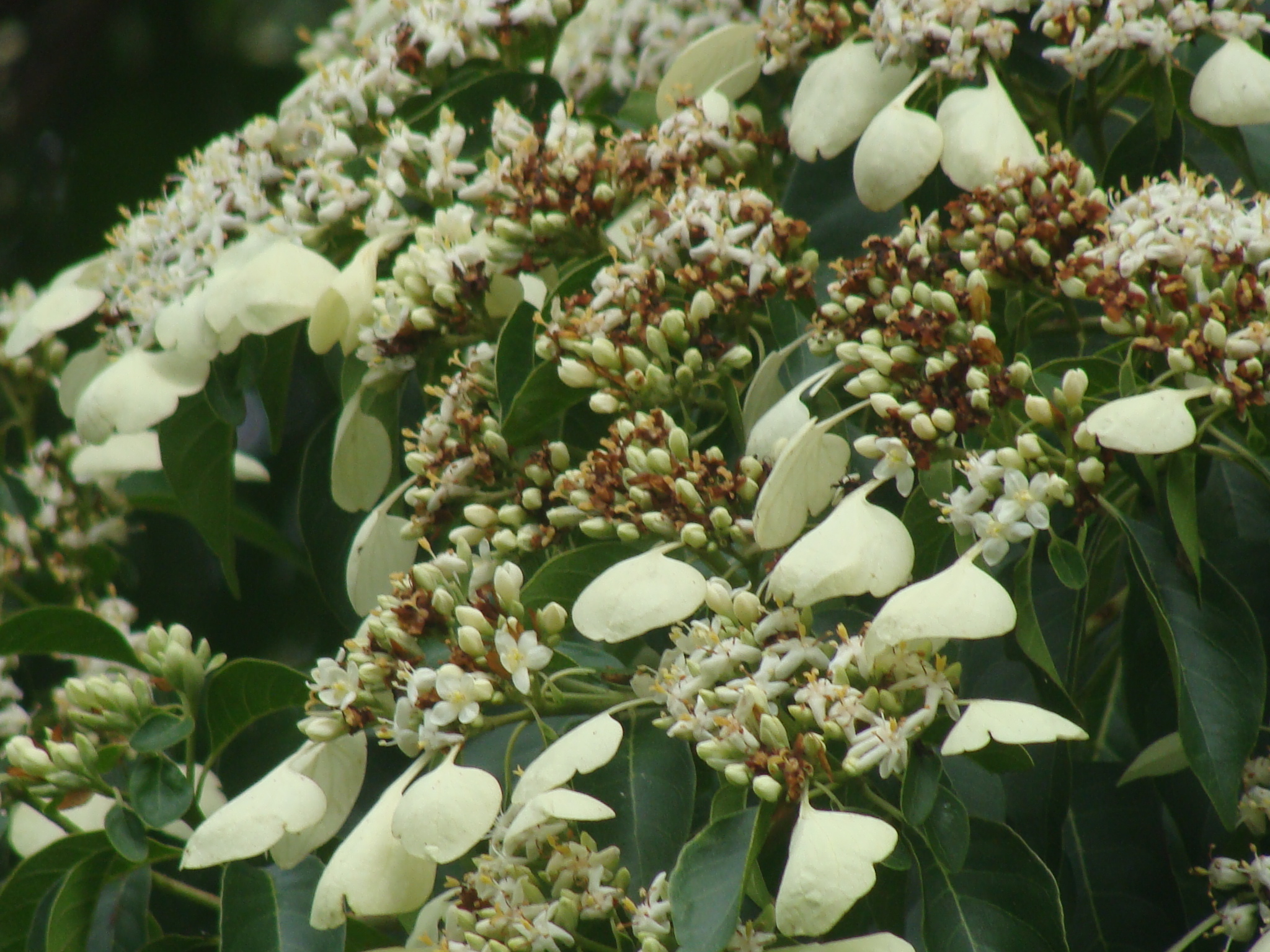
- Flowers

Conservation status
- Least Concern (IUCN 3.1)

Scientific classification
- Kingdom: Plantae
- Clade: Embryophytes
- Clade: Tracheophytes
- Clade: Angiosperms
- Clade: Eudicots
- Clade: Asterids
- Order: Gentianales
- Family: Rubiaceae
- Genus: Calycophyllum
- Species: C. candidissimum

Binomial name
- Calycophyllum candidissimum (Vahl) DC.

Synonyms
- Macrocnemum candidissimum Vahl; Mussaenda candida Poir.; Mussaenda candidissima (Vahl) Schult.

= Calycophyllum candidissimum =

Species of flowering plant

Calycophyllum candidissimum, the degami, dagame, or lemonwood, is a species of flowering plant in the family Rubiaceae, native to southern Mexico, Cuba, Central America, Colombia, and Venezuela. It is found in the ecoregion of Central American dry forests. It is the national tree of Nicaragua.
