= Dolicholobium =

Scientific classification
- Kingdom: Plantae
- Clade: Tracheophytes
- Clade: Angiosperms
- Clade: Eudicots
- Clade: Asterids
- Order: Gentianales
- Family: Rubiaceae
- Subfamily: Ixoroideae
- Tribe: Dialypetalantheae
- Genus: Dolicholobium; A.Gray

Genus of plants

Dolicholobium is a genus of flowering plants in the family Rubiaceae. The genus is found from central Malesia to the southwestern Pacific.

== Species ==
- Dolicholobium aciculatum Burkill - Solomon Islands
- Dolicholobium barbatum M.E.Jansen - D'Entrecasteaux Islands
- Dolicholobium brassii Merr. & L.M.Perry - Solomon Islands
- Dolicholobium cordatum M.E.Jansen - Louisiade Archipelago
- Dolicholobium crassicarpum M.E.Jansen - Papua New Guinea
- Dolicholobium forbesii Wernham - Papua New Guinea
- Dolicholobium gertrudis K.Schum. - Papuasia
- Dolicholobium glabrum M.E.Jansen - Solomon Islands
- Dolicholobium graciliflorum Valeton - Papua New Guinea
- Dolicholobium leptocarpum Merr. & L.M.Perry - New Guinea
- Dolicholobium linearilobum M.E.Jansen - Papua New Guinea
- Dolicholobium longifructum M.E.Jansen - Louisiade Archipelago, Woodlark Island
- Dolicholobium macgregorii Horne ex Baker - Fiji
- Dolicholobium minutilobum M.E.Jansen - Santa Isabel Island
- Dolicholobium moluccense M.E.Jansen - Maluku Islands
- Dolicholobium nakiki M.E.Jansen - Bismarck Archipelago
- Dolicholobium oblongifolium A.Gray - Fiji, Vanuatu
- Dolicholobium oxylobum K.Schum. & Lauterb. - New Guinea
- Dolicholobium parviflorum M.E.Jansen - Bougainville Island
- Dolicholobium peekelii Valeton - Bismarck Archipelago
- Dolicholobium philippinense Trel. - Philippines
- Dolicholobium rheophilum M.E.Jansen - Louisiade Archipelago
- Dolicholobium ridsdalei M.E.Jansen - Bougainville Island
- Dolicholobium riuense M.E.Jansen - Louisiade Archipelago
- Dolicholobium rubrum Schltr. ex Valeton - Papua New Guinea
- Dolicholobium rufiflorum S.Moore - Papua New Guinea
- Dolicholobium seruiense M.E.Jansen - Yapen
- Dolicholobium solomonense Merr. & L.M.Perry - Solomon Islands, Vanuatu
