= Pentagonia rubriflora =

Conservation status
- Data Deficient (IUCN 2.3)

Scientific classification
- Kingdom: Plantae
- Clade: Tracheophytes
- Clade: Angiosperms
- Clade: Eudicots
- Clade: Asterids
- Order: Gentianales
- Family: Rubiaceae
- Genus: Pentagonia
- Species: P. rubriflora

Binomial name
- Pentagonia rubriflora D.R.Simpson

Species of plant

Pentagonia rubriflora is a species of plant in the family Rubiaceae. It is endemic to Peru.
