= Sommera sabiceoides =

Scientific classification
- Kingdom: Plantae
- Clade: Tracheophytes
- Clade: Angiosperms
- Clade: Eudicots
- Clade: Asterids
- Order: Gentianales
- Family: Rubiaceae
- Genus: Sommera
- Species: S. sabiceoides

Binomial name
- Sommera sabiceoides K.Schum.

Species of plant

Sommera sabiceoides is a perennial of the family Rubiaceae. It is native to the wet tropical biomes of Northern Brazil, Colombia, Ecuador, and Peru.

== Description ==
Sommera sabiceoides is a woody perennial that is average 4.5 meters tall and 13 cm wide at breast height. It has simple oblanceolate or somewhat acute leaves that are 13~19 cm long. The underside of leaves are covered with fine hairs and are paired at each node. Flowers can be pink or white to greenish white with cream insides. The calyx is greenish and accrescent after the flowering phase. The flowers are arranged in a panicle-type inflorescence and bear green winged fruit.
