= Wittmackanthus =

Scientific classification
- Kingdom: Plantae
- Clade: Tracheophytes
- Clade: Angiosperms
- Clade: Eudicots
- Clade: Asterids
- Order: Gentianales
- Family: Rubiaceae
- Subfamily: Ixoroideae
- Tribe: Dialypetalantheae
- Genus: Wittmackanthus; Kuntze
- Species: W. stanleyanus

Binomial name
- Wittmackanthus stanleyanus (M.R.Schomb.) Kuntze

Synonyms
- Alseis darienensis Dwyer; Calycophyllum stanleyanum M.R.Schomb.; Pallasia stanleyana (M.R.Schomb.) Klotzsch; Rondeletia dukei Dwyer & M.V.Hayden

Species of plant

Wittmackanthus is a monotypic genus of flowering plants in the family Rubiaceae. The genus contains only one species, Wittmackanthus stanleyanus, which is found in Panama, Colombia, Ecuador, Peru and Guyana.

The genus has one known synonym of Pallasia Klotzsch The genus name of Wittmackanthus is in honour of Ludwig Wittmack (1839–1929), a German botanist. The specific epithet honors the British Colonial Secretary, Lord Stanley. Both the genus and the species were described and published by Carl Ernst Otto Kuntze in Revis. Gen. Pl. Vol.1 on page 302 in 1891.
