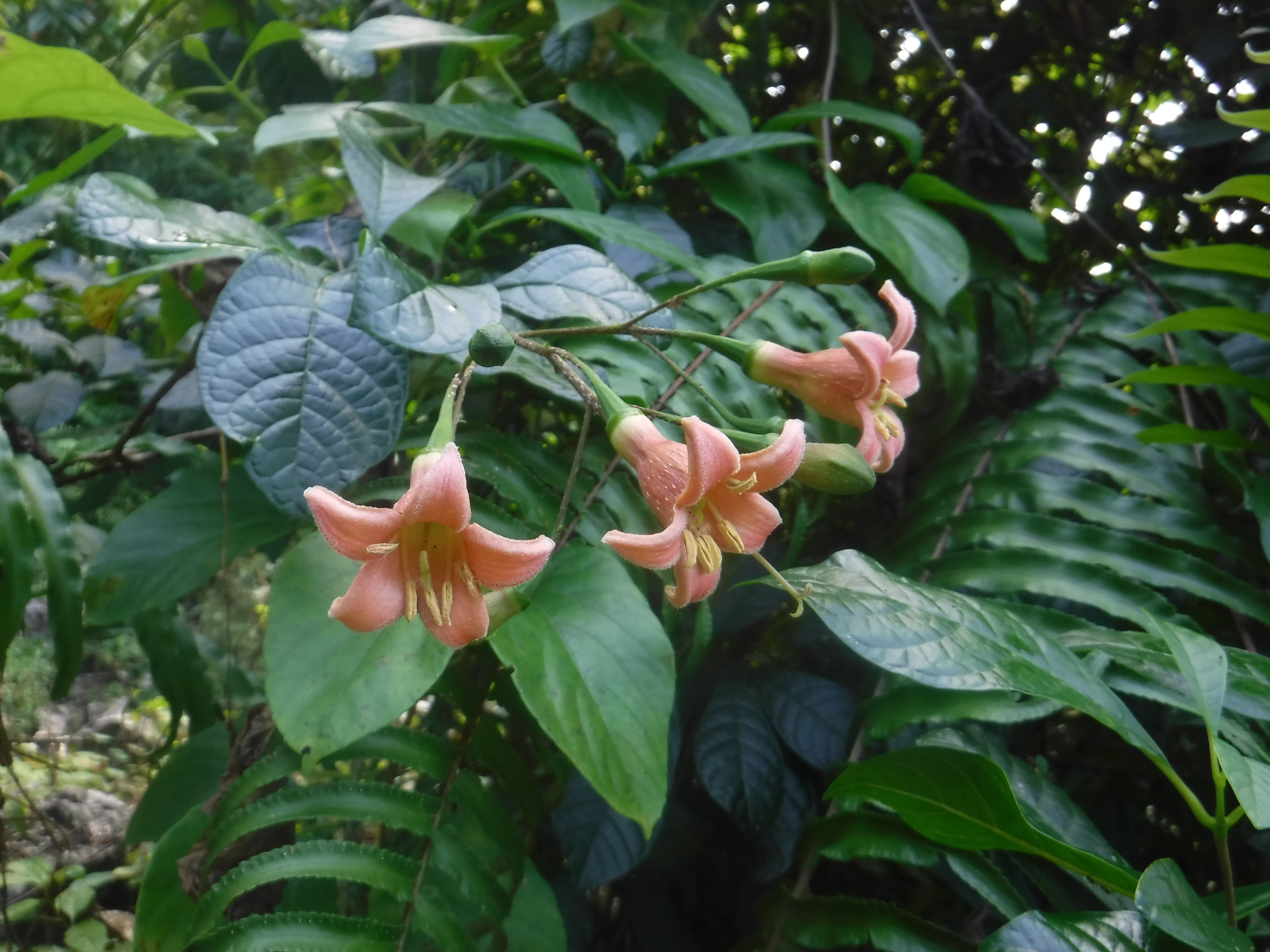
- Picardaea haitiensis in the wild.

Scientific classification
- Kingdom: Plantae
- Clade: Tracheophytes
- Clade: Angiosperms
- Clade: Eudicots
- Clade: Asterids
- Order: Gentianales
- Family: Rubiaceae
- Subfamily: Ixoroideae
- Tribe: Dialypetalantheae
- Genus: Picardaea; Urb.
- Species: P. haitiensis

Binomial name
- Picardaea haitiensis Urb.

= Picardaea =

Genus of plants

Picardaea is a genus of plant in the family Rubiaceae. Picardaea haitiensis is the only member of this genus and endemic to the island of Hispaniola in the Caribbean. It is listed as endangered in the red list of the Dominican Republic but is not currently assessed by the IUCN.
