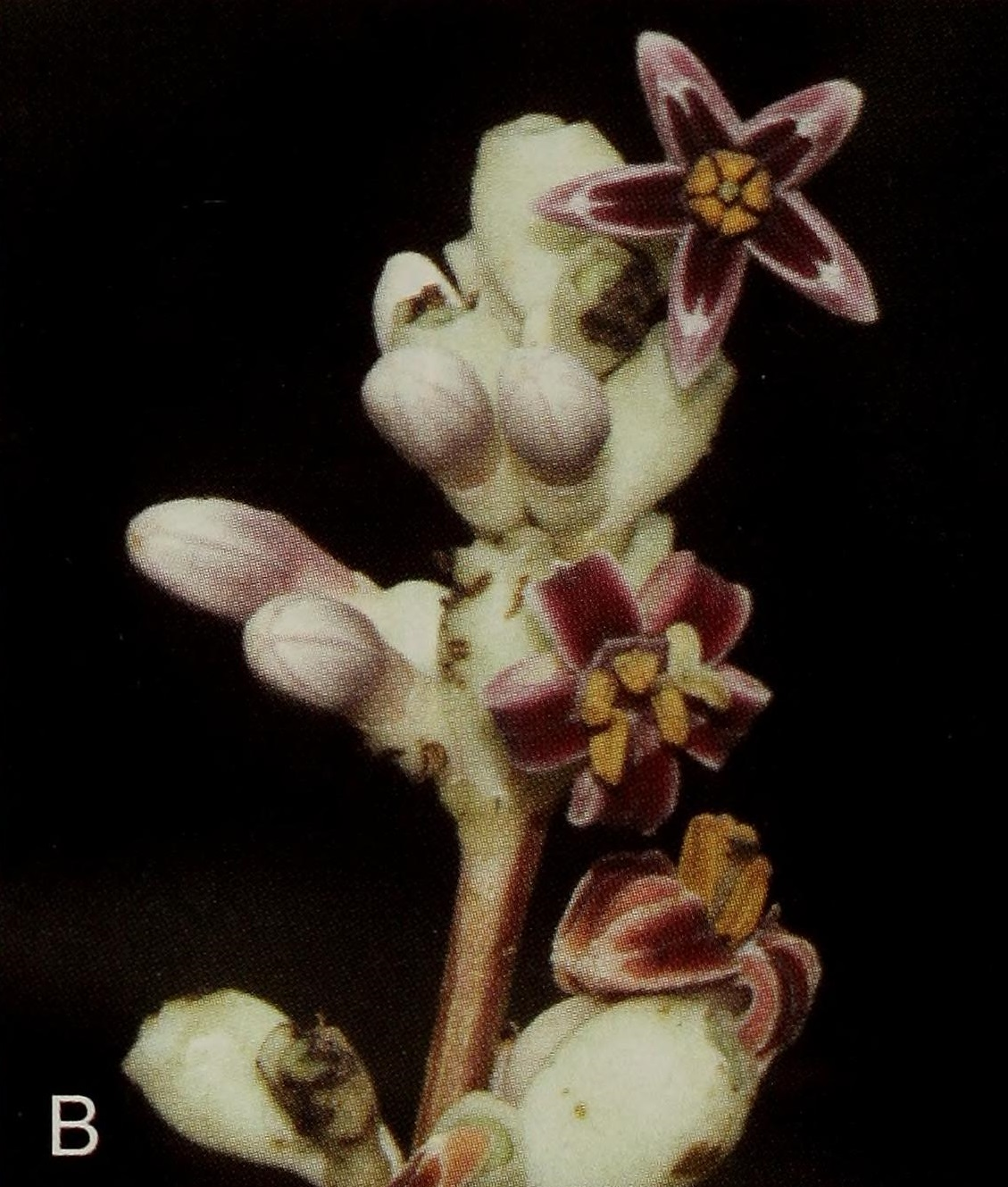

Conservation status
- Endangered (IUCN 3.1)

Scientific classification
- Kingdom: Plantae
- Clade: Tracheophytes
- Clade: Angiosperms
- Clade: Eudicots
- Clade: Asterids
- Order: Gentianales
- Family: Rubiaceae
- Genus: Rustia
- Species: R. bilsana

Binomial name
- Rustia bilsana Delprete

= Rustia bilsana =

Species of plant

Rustia bilsana is a species of plant in the family Rubiaceae. It is endemic to Ecuador.
