= Mastixiodendron plectocarpum =

Conservation status
- Near Threatened (IUCN 2.3)

Scientific classification
- Kingdom: Plantae
- Clade: Tracheophytes
- Clade: Angiosperms
- Clade: Eudicots
- Clade: Asterids
- Order: Gentianales
- Family: Rubiaceae
- Genus: Mastixiodendron
- Species: M. plectocarpum

Binomial name
- Mastixiodendron plectocarpum S.Darwin

Species of plant

Mastixiodendron plectocarpum is a species of plant in the family Rubiaceae. It is found in Indonesia and Papua New Guinea. It is threatened by habitat loss.
