= Alseis lugonis =

Conservation status
- Near Threatened (IUCN 3.1)

Scientific classification
- Kingdom: Plantae
- Clade: Tracheophytes
- Clade: Angiosperms
- Clade: Eudicots
- Clade: Asterids
- Order: Gentianales
- Family: Rubiaceae
- Genus: Alseis
- Species: A. lugonis

Binomial name
- Alseis lugonis L.Andersson

Species of plant

Alseis lugonis is a species of flowering plant in the family Rubiaceae. It is endemic to Ecuador.
