= Condaminea elegans =

Scientific classification
- Kingdom: Plantae
- Clade: Tracheophytes
- Clade: Angiosperms
- Clade: Eudicots
- Clade: Asterids
- Order: Gentianales
- Family: Rubiaceae
- Genus: Condaminea
- Species: C. elegans

Binomial name
- Condaminea elegans Delprete, 1999

Species of plant

Condaminea elegans is a flowering plant species in the genus Condaminea found in Peru.
