= Mastixiodendron =

Scientific classification
- Kingdom: Plantae
- Clade: Tracheophytes
- Clade: Angiosperms
- Clade: Eudicots
- Clade: Asterids
- Order: Gentianales
- Family: Rubiaceae
- Subfamily: Ixoroideae
- Tribe: Dialypetalantheae
- Genus: Mastixiodendron; Melch.

Species
- See text

Genus of plants

Mastixiodendron is a genus of flowering plants in the family Rubiaceae. It contains the following species (but this list may be incomplete):

- Mastixiodendron plectocarpum S.Darwin
- Mastixiodendron stoddardii Merr. & Perry
