= Standleyanthus =

Scientific classification
- Kingdom: Plantae
- Clade: Tracheophytes
- Clade: Angiosperms
- Clade: Eudicots
- Clade: Asterids
- Order: Asterales
- Family: Asteraceae
- Subfamily: Asteroideae
- Tribe: Eupatorieae
- Genus: Standleyanthus; R.M.King & H.Rob
- Species: S. triptychus

Binomial name
- Standleyanthus triptychus (B.L.Rob.) R.M.King & H.Rob

Synonyms
- Eupatorium triptychum B.L.Rob.

Species of flowering plant

Standleyanthus is a genus of Central American plants in the tribe Eupatorieae within the family Asteraceae.

The genus is named after US botanist Paul Carpenter Standley (1884-1963). The Latin specific epithet of triptychus is a compound word with 'tri' meaning three and 'ptychus' meaning plate.

Species

The only known species is Standleyanthus triptychus, which is native to Costa Rica.
