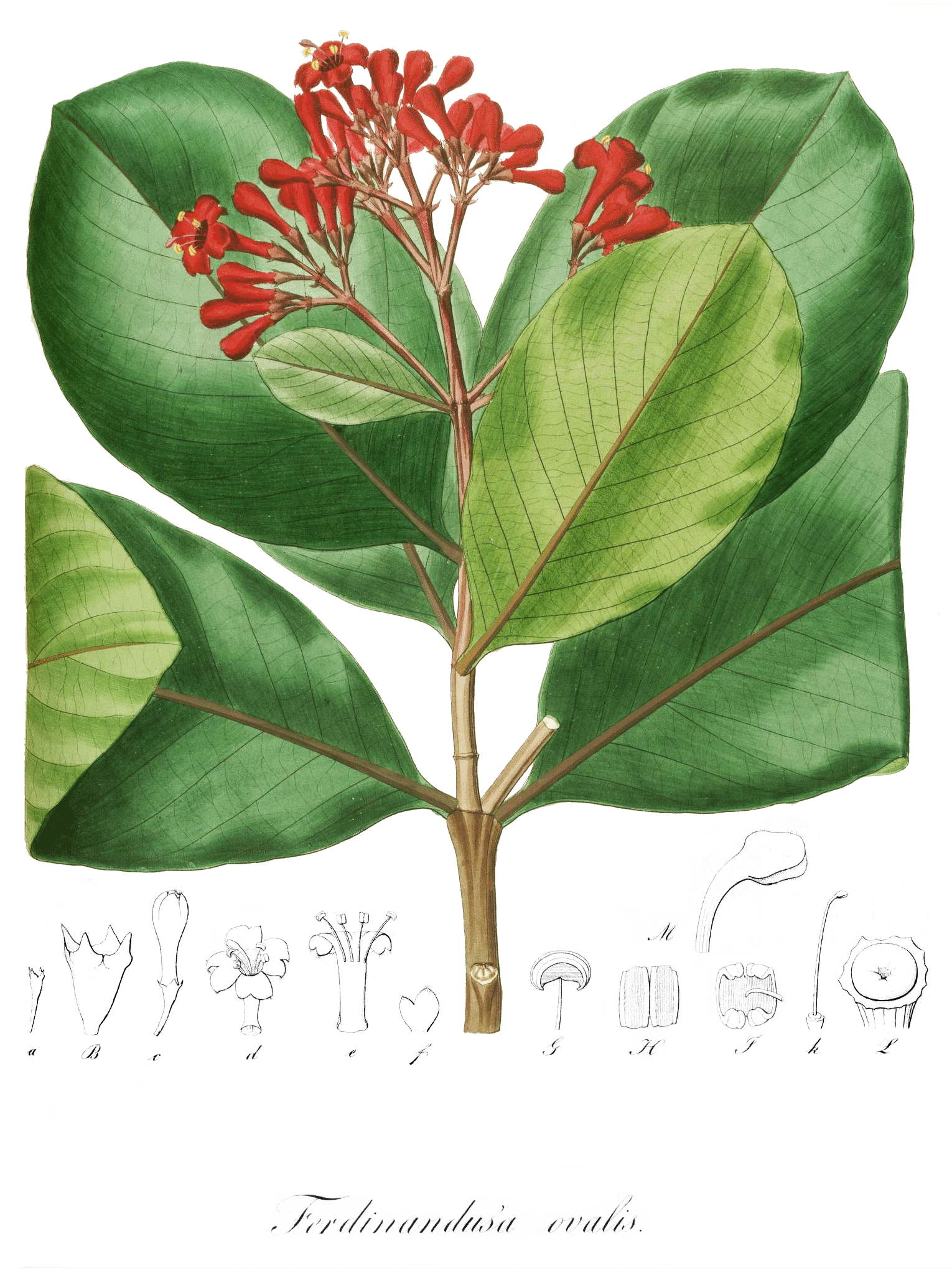
- Ferdinandusa elliptica

Scientific classification
- Kingdom: Plantae
- Clade: Tracheophytes
- Clade: Angiosperms
- Clade: Eudicots
- Clade: Asterids
- Order: Gentianales
- Family: Rubiaceae
- Subfamily: Ixoroideae
- Tribe: Dialypetalantheae
- Genus: Ferdinandusa; Pohl

Synonyms
- Ferdinandea Pohl; Aspidanthera Benth.; Gomphosia Wedd.

= Ferdinandusa =

Genus of plants

Ferdinandusa is a genus of flowering plants in the family Rubiaceae, native to the American tropics.

== Taxonomy ==
The genus was initially named Ferdinandea by Johann Baptist Emanuel Pohl (but that name was an illegitimate homonym) who placed it in the family Bignoniaceae. This species is a shrub or small tree that occurs at the edge of a swamp in a gallery forest.

== Breeding ==
The beginning of anthesis and the opening of the stigmatic lips occur at dusk. The nectar is secreted during both the male and the female phases, with concentration of sugars greater in the male phase. The flowers are pollinated by two hummingbird species, Chlorostilbon aureoventris and Phaethornis pretrei.

== Species ==
Species include:

- Ferdinandusa boomii Steyerm.
- Ferdinandusa chlorantha (Wedd.) Standl.
- Ferdinandusa cordata Ducke
- Ferdinandusa dissimiliflora (Mutis ex Humb.) Standl.
- Ferdinandusa duckei Steyerm.
- Ferdinandusa edmundoi Sucre
- Ferdinandusa elliptica (Pohl) Pohl
- Ferdinandusa goudotiana K.Schum.
- Ferdinandusa guainiae Spruce ex K.Schum.
- Ferdinandusa hirsuta Standl.
- Ferdinandusa lanceolata K.Schum.
- Ferdinandusa leucantha Standl.
- Ferdinandusa loretensis Standl.
- Ferdinandusa neblinensis Steyerm.
- Ferdinandusa nitida Ducke
- Ferdinandusa panamensis Standl. & L.O.Williams
- Ferdinandusa paporiensis Suess.
- Ferdinandusa paraensis Ducke
- Ferdinandusa rudgeoides (Benth.) Wedd.
- Ferdinandusa scandens Ducke
- Ferdinandusa schultesii Steyerm.
- Ferdinandusa speciosa (Pohl) Pohl
- Ferdinandusa sprucei K.Schum.
- Ferdinandusa uaupensis Spruce ex K.Schum.
