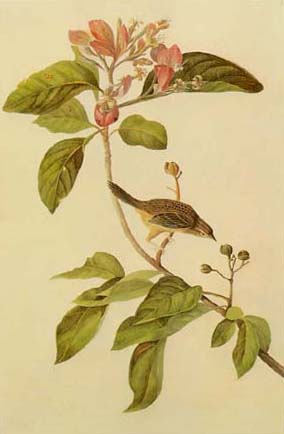
- Branch of Pinckneya pubens from The Birds of America; painted by Maria Martin

Conservation status
- Least Concern (IUCN 3.1)

Scientific classification
- Kingdom: Plantae
- Clade: Embryophytes
- Clade: Tracheophytes
- Clade: Angiosperms
- Clade: Eudicots
- Clade: Asterids
- Order: Gentianales
- Family: Rubiaceae
- Subfamily: Ixoroideae
- Tribe: Dialypetalantheae
- Genus: Pinckneya; Michx.
- Species: P. pubens

Binomial name
- Pinckneya pubens Mich.
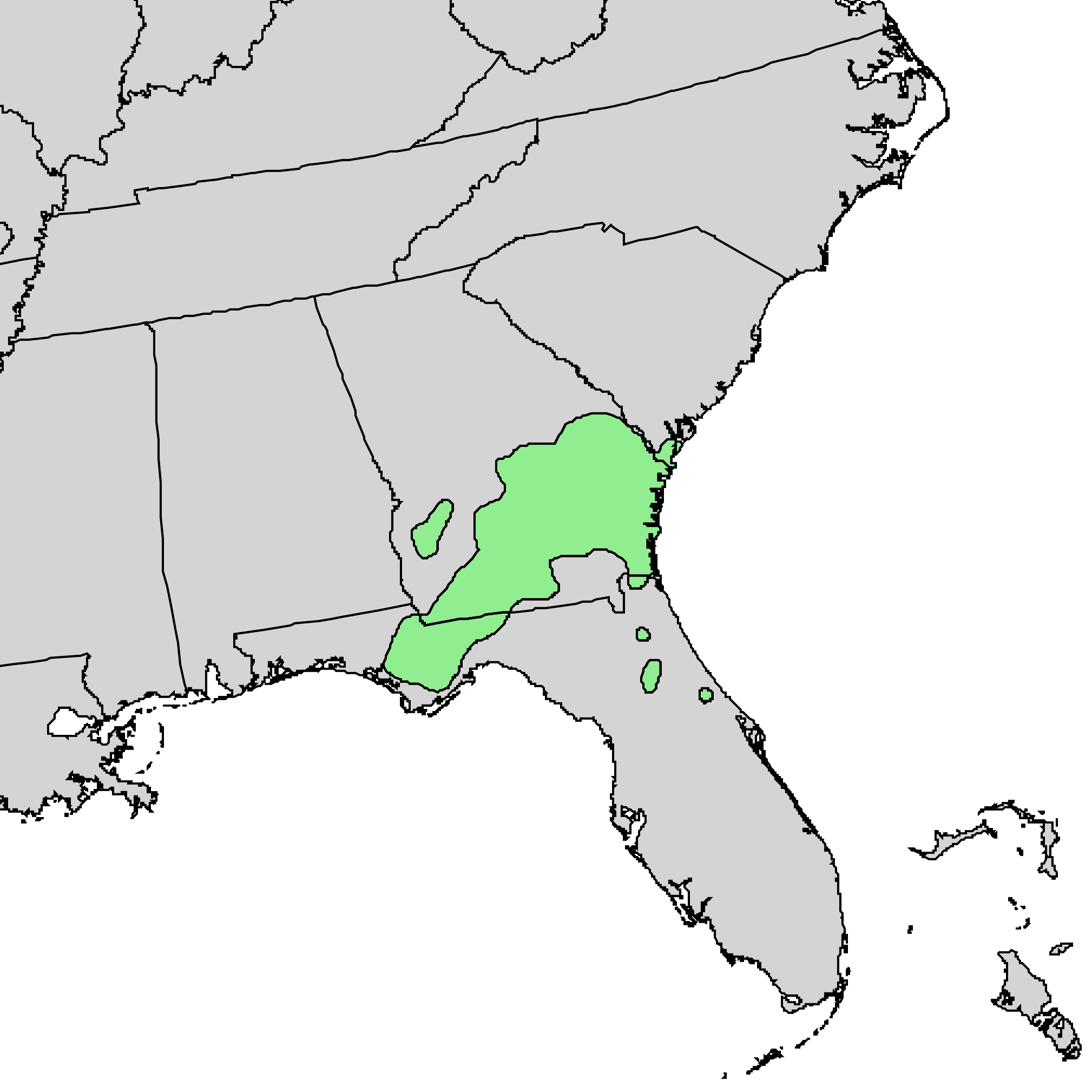
- Natural range of Pinckneya pubens

Synonyms
- Pinckneya bracteata (W. Bartr.); Cinchona lancifolia (Mutis.)

= Pinckneya =

Species of plant

Pinckneya is a genus of flowering plants belonging to the family Rubiaceae. Its only species is Pinckneya pubens, native to the Southeastern USA. It is known as the Georgia bark or fevertree. It is a small tree of the southern United States closely resembling the cinchona or Peruvian bark. It has pretty, large white flowers, with longitudinal stripes of rose-color. The wood is soft and unfit for use in the arts. The inner bark is extremely bitter.

== Habitat and cultivation ==
Pinckneya pubens is native to poorly-drained acidic soils, as along swamp margins. Soils may be fine, medium or coarse textured. Good pest resistance and distinctive flower characteristics make this species of interest to gardeners, who should ensure that it receives occasional irrigation over a dry summer.
