= Simira wurdackii =

Conservation status
- Vulnerable (IUCN 2.3)

Scientific classification
- Kingdom: Plantae
- Clade: Tracheophytes
- Clade: Angiosperms
- Clade: Eudicots
- Clade: Asterids
- Order: Gentianales
- Family: Rubiaceae
- Genus: Simira
- Species: S. wurdackii

Binomial name
- Simira wurdackii Steyerm.

Species of plant

Simira wurdackii is a species of plant in the family Rubiaceae. It is endemic to Peru.
