= Alseis yucatanensis =

Scientific classification
- Kingdom: Plantae
- Clade: Embryophytes
- Clade: Tracheophytes
- Clade: Angiosperms
- Clade: Eudicots
- Clade: Asterids
- Order: Gentianales
- Family: Rubiaceae
- Genus: Alseis
- Species: A. yucatanensis

Binomial name
- Alseis yucatanensis Standl.

Species of flowering plant

Alseis yucatanensis is a species of flowering plant in the family Rubiaceae. This species is native to Southeast Mexico and Guatemala, and is found in wet tropical biomes.
