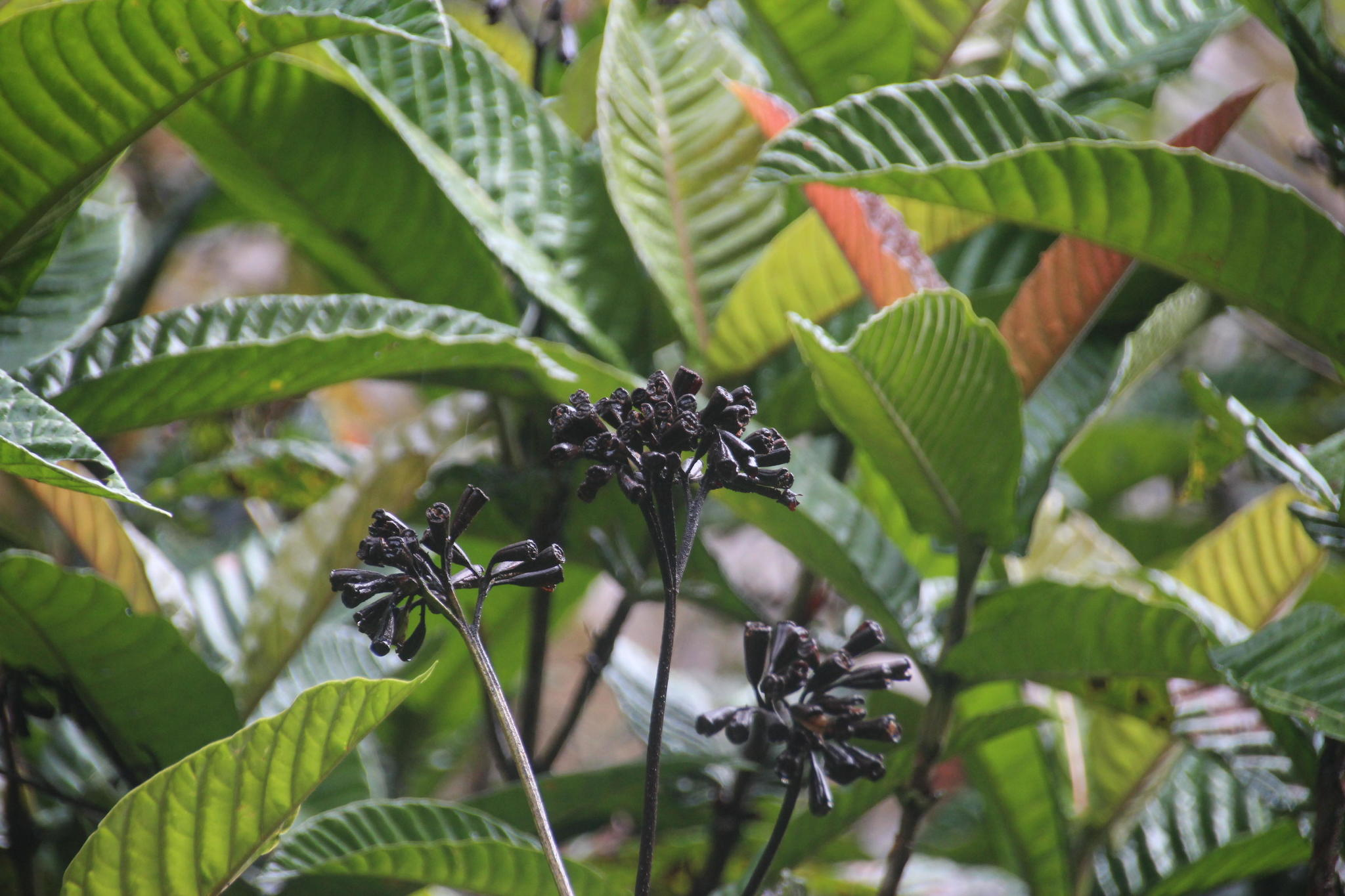
- Condaminea corymbosa

Scientific classification
- Kingdom: Plantae
- Clade: Tracheophytes
- Clade: Angiosperms
- Clade: Eudicots
- Clade: Asterids
- Order: Gentianales
- Family: Rubiaceae
- Subfamily: Ixoroideae
- Tribe: Dialypetalantheae
- Genus: Condaminea; DC.

= Condaminea =

Genus of plants

Condaminea is a genus of flowering plants in the family Rubiaceae. They are found in Central and tropical South America.

== Species ==
- Condaminea corymbosa (Ruiz & Pav.) DC.
- Condaminea elegans Delprete
- Condaminea glabrata DC.
- Condaminea microcarpa (Ruiz & Pav.) DC.
- Condaminea venosa (Ruiz & Pav.) DC.
