= Dialypetalanthus =

Scientific classification
- Kingdom: Plantae
- Clade: Tracheophytes
- Clade: Angiosperms
- Clade: Eudicots
- Clade: Asterids
- Order: Gentianales
- Family: Rubiaceae
- Subfamily: Ixoroideae
- Tribe: Dialypetalantheae
- Genus: Dialypetalanthus; Kuhlm.
- Species: D. fuscescens

Binomial name
- Dialypetalanthus fuscescens Kuhlm.

Genus of plants

Dialypetalanthus is a genus of trees in the family Rubiaceae. It only contains one species, Dialypetalanthus fuscescens, which is found in Bolivia, Brazil and Peru.
