= Mussaendopsis =

Scientific classification
- Kingdom: Plantae
- Clade: Tracheophytes
- Clade: Angiosperms
- Clade: Eudicots
- Clade: Asterids
- Order: Gentianales
- Family: Rubiaceae
- Subfamily: Ixoroideae
- Tribe: Dialypetalantheae
- Genus: Mussaendopsis; Baill.

Genus of plants

Mussaendopsis is a genus of flowering plants belonging to the family Rubiaceae.

Its native range is Malesia.

== Species ==
Species:

- Mussaendopsis beccariana Baill.
- Mussaendopsis celebica Bremek.

== Excluded names ==
- Mussaendopsis malayana T.Yamaz. [≡ Steenisia pleurocarpa (Airy Shaw) Bakh.f. var. malayana (T.Yamaz.) K.M.Wong]
