= Tammsia =

Scientific classification
- Kingdom: Plantae
- Clade: Tracheophytes
- Clade: Angiosperms
- Clade: Eudicots
- Clade: Asterids
- Order: Gentianales
- Family: Rubiaceae
- Subfamily: Ixoroideae
- Tribe: Dialypetalantheae
- Genus: Tammsia; H.Karst.
- Species: T. anomala

Binomial name
- Tammsia anomala H.Karst.

Species of plant

Tammsia is a monotypic genus of flowering plant belonging to the family Rubiaceae. It only contains one known species, Tammsia anomala.

It is native to Colombia, Peru and Venezuela in western South America.

The genus name of Tammsia is in honour of Georg Tamms, a German doctor from Altona (near Hamburg), who was also a plant collector. The Latin specific epithet of anomala is derived from Greek word anomalus meaning anomalous (deviating from what is standard, normal, or expected). Both the genus and the species were first described and published in Fl. Columb. Vol.1 on page 179 in 1861.
