= Pentagonia spathicalyx =

Conservation status
- Least Concern (IUCN 3.1)

Scientific classification
- Kingdom: Plantae
- Clade: Tracheophytes
- Clade: Angiosperms
- Clade: Eudicots
- Clade: Asterids
- Order: Gentianales
- Family: Rubiaceae
- Genus: Pentagonia
- Species: P. spathicalyx

Binomial name
- Pentagonia spathicalyx K.Schum.

Synonyms
- Pentagonia grantii Steyerm.; Pentagonia peruviana Standl.; Pentagonia velutina Standl.; Pentagonia woronovii Standl.; Watsonamra spathicalyx (K.Schum.) Kuntze

Species of plant

Pentagonia spathicalyx is a species of flowering plant in the family Rubiaceae, native to western South America (Colombia, Ecuador and Peru) to north Brazil. It was first described by Karl Moritz Schumann in 1889.
