= Parachimarrhis =

Scientific classification
- Kingdom: Plantae
- Clade: Tracheophytes
- Clade: Angiosperms
- Clade: Eudicots
- Clade: Asterids
- Order: Gentianales
- Family: Rubiaceae
- Subfamily: Ixoroideae
- Tribe: Dialypetalantheae
- Genus: Parachimarrhis; Ducke
- Species: P. breviloba

Binomial name
- Parachimarrhis breviloba Ducke

Genus of plants

Parachimarrhis is a monotypic genus of flowering plants belonging to the family Rubiaceae. Its sole species is Parachimarrhis breviloba, native to southern Tropical America.
