= Sommera =

Scientific classification
- Kingdom: Plantae
- Clade: Tracheophytes
- Clade: Angiosperms
- Clade: Eudicots
- Clade: Asterids
- Order: Gentianales
- Family: Rubiaceae
- Subfamily: Ixoroideae
- Tribe: Dialypetalantheae
- Genus: Sommera; Schltdl.

Genus of plants

Sommera is a genus of flowering plants belonging to the family Rubiaceae.

Its native range is from Mexico to Peru. It is also found in northern Brazil, Colombia, Costa Rica, Ecuador, Guatemala, Honduras, Nicaragua and Panamá.

The genus name of Sommera is in honour of Christian Niefeldt Sommer (1821–1878), a German entomologist, who supported the research of author of the genus, Diederich Friedrich Carl von Schlechtendal. It was first described and published in Linnaea Vol.9 on page 602 in 1835.

== Known species ==
According to Kew:

- Sommera arborescens Schltdl.
- Sommera chiapensis Brandegee
- Sommera cusucoana Lorence, D.Kelly & A.Dietzsch
- Sommera donnell-smithii Standl.
- Sommera fusca Oerst. ex Standl.
- Sommera grandis (Bartl. ex DC.) Standl.
- Sommera guatemalensis Standl.
- Sommera montana L.O.Williams
- Sommera parva Lorence
- Sommera purdiei Standl.
- Sommera sabiceoides K.Schum.
