= Schizocalyx =

Scientific classification
- Kingdom: Plantae
- Clade: Tracheophytes
- Clade: Angiosperms
- Clade: Eudicots
- Clade: Asterids
- Order: Gentianales
- Family: Rubiaceae
- Subfamily: Ixoroideae
- Tribe: Dialypetalantheae
- Genus: Schizocalyx; Wedd. (1854), nom. cons.

Species
- 9; see text

Synonyms
- Phitopis Hook.f. (1871)

Genus of plants

Schizocalyx is a genus of flowering plants in family Rubiaceae. It includes 9 species native to the tropical Americas, ranging from Costa Rica to Bolivia and southeastern Brazil.

- Schizocalyx bracteosa Wedd.
- Schizocalyx condoricus D.A.Neill & C.M.Taylor
- Schizocalyx cuspidatus (A.St.-Hil.) Kainul. & B.Bremer
- Schizocalyx multiflorus (Hook.f.) Kainul. & B.Bremer
- Schizocalyx obovatus (K.Schum. ex Standl.) Kainul. & B.Bremer
- Schizocalyx peruvianus (K.Krause) Kainul. & B.Bremer
- Schizocalyx sterculioides (Standl.) Kainul. & B.Bremer
- Schizocalyx truncatus C.M.Taylor
- Schizocalyx veraguensis (Dwyer) Kainul. & B.Bremer
