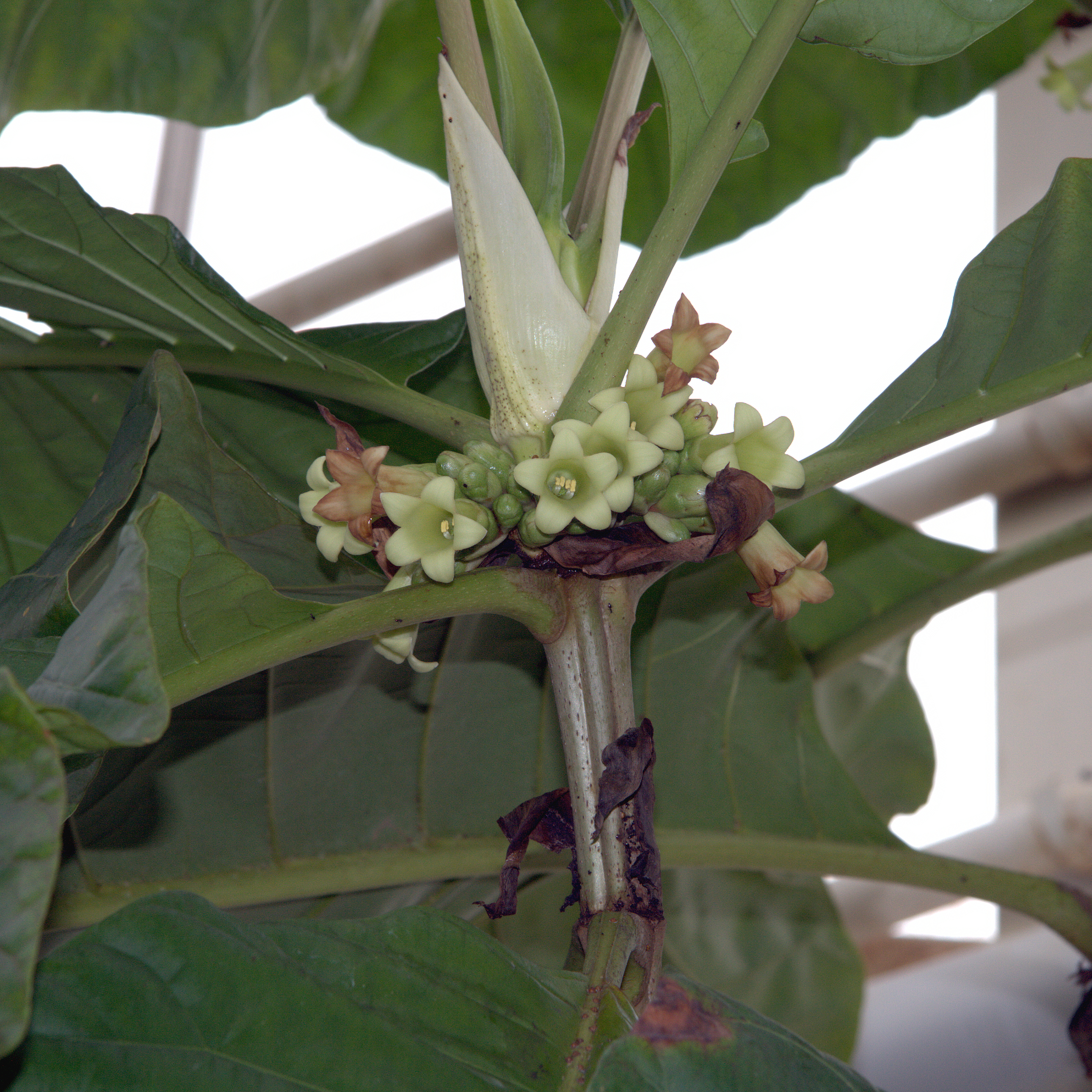

Conservation status
- Least Concern (IUCN 3.1)

Scientific classification
- Kingdom: Plantae
- Clade: Tracheophytes
- Clade: Angiosperms
- Clade: Eudicots
- Clade: Asterids
- Order: Gentianales
- Family: Rubiaceae
- Genus: Pentagonia
- Species: P. macrophylla

Binomial name
- Pentagonia macrophylla Benth.

Synonyms
- Pentagonia cuatrecasasii Standl. ex Steyerm.; Pentagonia orthoneura Standl.; Pentagonia pubescens (Standl.) Standl.; Pentagonia sprucei Standl.; Pentagonia veraguensis Dwyer; Watsonamra macrophylla (Benth.) Kuntze; Watsonamra pubescens Standl.

= Pentagonia macrophylla =

Species of plant

Pentagonia macrophylla is a species of flowering plant in the family Rubiaceae, native from south-eastern Nicaragua to Ecuador. It was first described by George Bentham in 1844.
