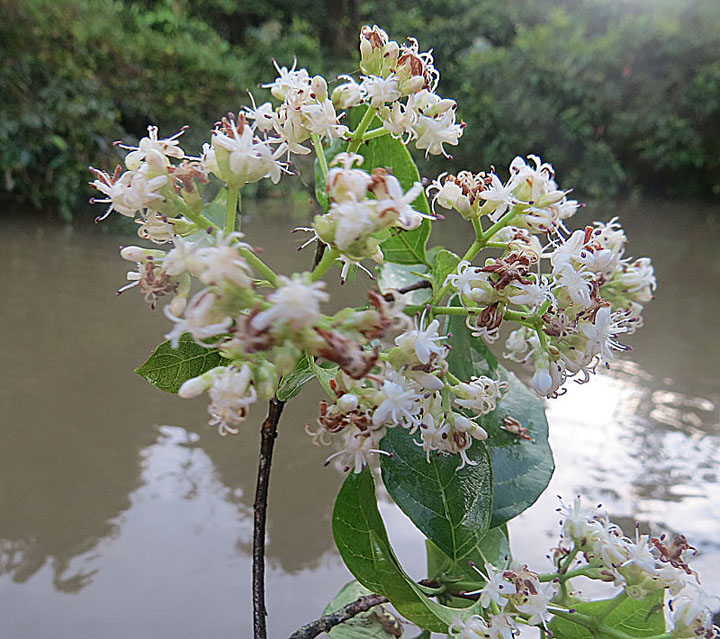

Scientific classification
- Kingdom: Plantae
- Clade: Tracheophytes
- Clade: Angiosperms
- Clade: Eudicots
- Clade: Asterids
- Order: Gentianales
- Family: Rubiaceae
- Subfamily: Ixoroideae
- Tribe: Dialypetalantheae
- Genus: Bothriospora; Hook.f.
- Species: B. corymbosa

Binomial name
- Bothriospora corymbosa (Benth.) Hook.f.

Synonyms
- genus: Tepesia C.F.Gaertn.; species: Evosmia corymbosa Benth.

= Bothriospora =

Species of plant

Bothriospora is a monotypic genus of flowering plants in the family Rubiaceae. The genus contains only one species, viz. Bothriospora corymbosa, native to Guyana, Venezuela, Colombia, Ecuador, Peru and northern Brazil.
