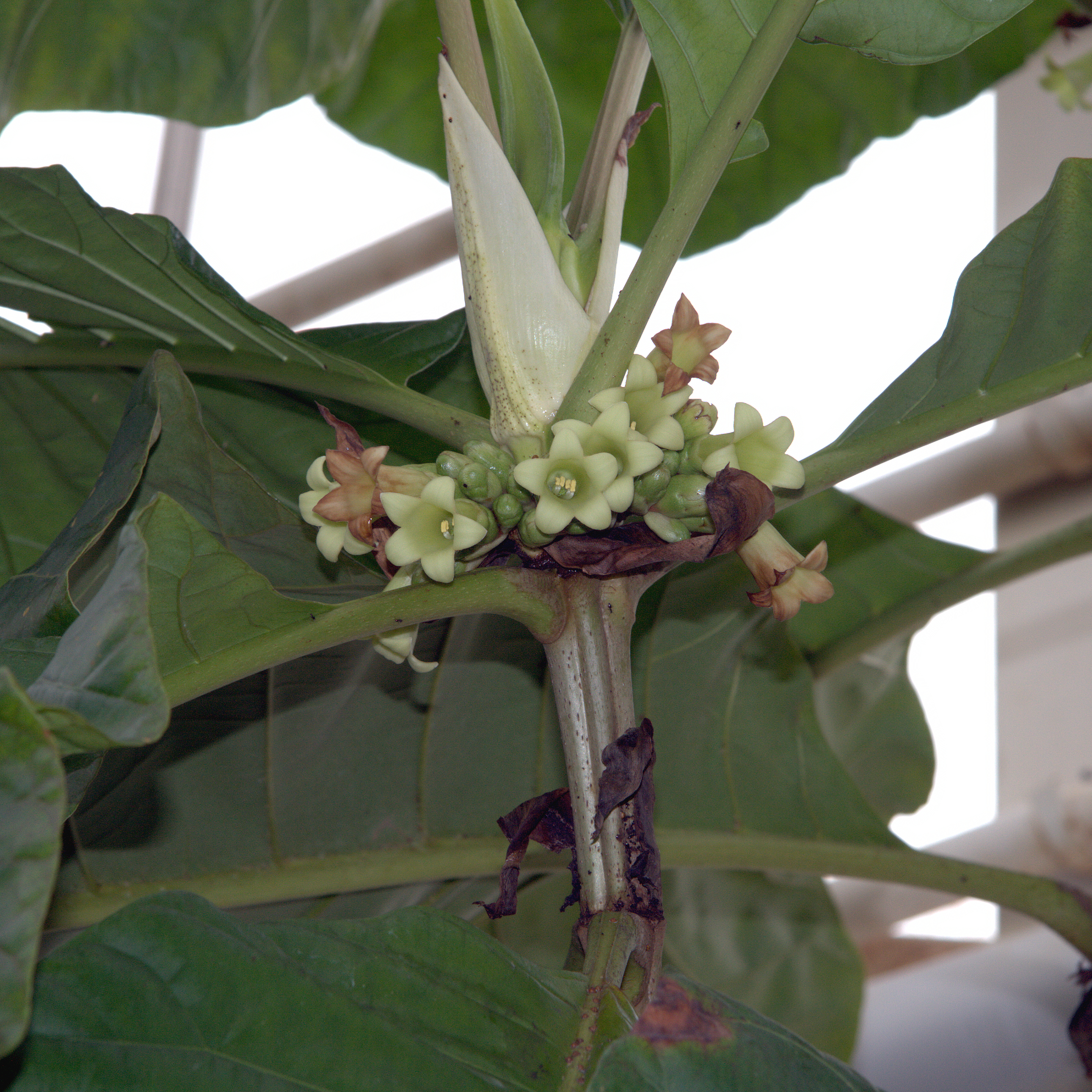
- Pentagonia macrophylla

Scientific classification
- Kingdom: Plantae
- Clade: Tracheophytes
- Clade: Angiosperms
- Clade: Eudicots
- Clade: Asterids
- Order: Gentianales
- Family: Rubiaceae
- Subfamily: Ixoroideae
- Tribe: Dialypetalantheae
- Genus: Pentagonia; Benth.

Species
- See text.

= Pentagonia (plant) =

Genus of plants

Pentagonia is a genus of over 40 species of plants in the coffee or gardenia family (Rubiaceae). Pentagonia species are native to Central America and northern South America, and grow in moist tropical forests below 900m. The genus was first described by George Bentham in 1845. Pentagonia are typically small monopodial trees up to 8 meters tall, but some are much-branched trees up to 18 meters tall. The genus is noteworthy for its large, entire and strongly carinate, interpetiolar stipules and large leaf blades, up to at least 200 cm long, with the leaf surfaces being distinctly and closely striate with fine epidermal fibers.

== Species ==
As of April 2021, Plants of the World Online accepted the following species:

- Pentagonia amazonica (Ducke) L.Andersson & Rova
- Pentagonia angustifolia C.M.Taylor
- Pentagonia australis C.M.Taylor & Janovec
- Pentagonia baumannii Cornejo & Rova
- Pentagonia bocataurensis Dwyer
- Pentagonia bonifaziana Cornejo
- Pentagonia breviloba L.Andersson & Rova
- Pentagonia carniflora Cornejo & Rova
- Pentagonia chocoensis Cornejo
- Pentagonia clementinensis Cornejo
- Pentagonia costaricensis (Standl.) W.C.Burger & C.M.Taylor
- Pentagonia donnell-smithii (Standl.) Standl.
- Pentagonia dwyeriana C.M.Taylor
- Pentagonia gambagam Hammel & Aguilar
- Pentagonia gigantifolia Ducke
- Pentagonia gomez-lauritoi Hammel
- Pentagonia grandiflora Standl.
- Pentagonia gymnopoda (Standl.) Standl.
- Pentagonia hirsuta Standl.
- Pentagonia imparipinnata Cornejo
- Pentagonia involucrata C.M.Taylor
- Pentagonia lanciloba Cornejo
- Pentagonia lobata C.M.Taylor
- Pentagonia macrophylla Benth., syn. Pentagonia orthoneura
- Pentagonia magnifica K.Krause
- Pentagonia microcarpa L.Andersson & Rova
- Pentagonia nuciformis Dwyer
- Pentagonia osaensis C.M.Taylor
- Pentagonia osapinnata Aguilar, N.Zamora & Hammel
- Pentagonia pachiteana Cornejo
- Pentagonia parvifolia Steyerm.
- Pentagonia pinnatifida Seem.
- Pentagonia rubriflora D.R.Simpson
- Pentagonia sanblasensis C.M.Taylor
- Pentagonia spathicalyx K.Schum., syn. Pentagonia peruviana
- Pentagonia subauriculata Standl.
- Pentagonia subsessilis L.Andersson & Rova
- Pentagonia tapacula Cornejo
- Pentagonia tinajita Seem.
- Pentagonia villosula L.Andersson & Rova
- Pentagonia wendlandii Hook.f.
- Pentagonia williamsii Standl.
- Pentagonia wurdackii Steyerm.
