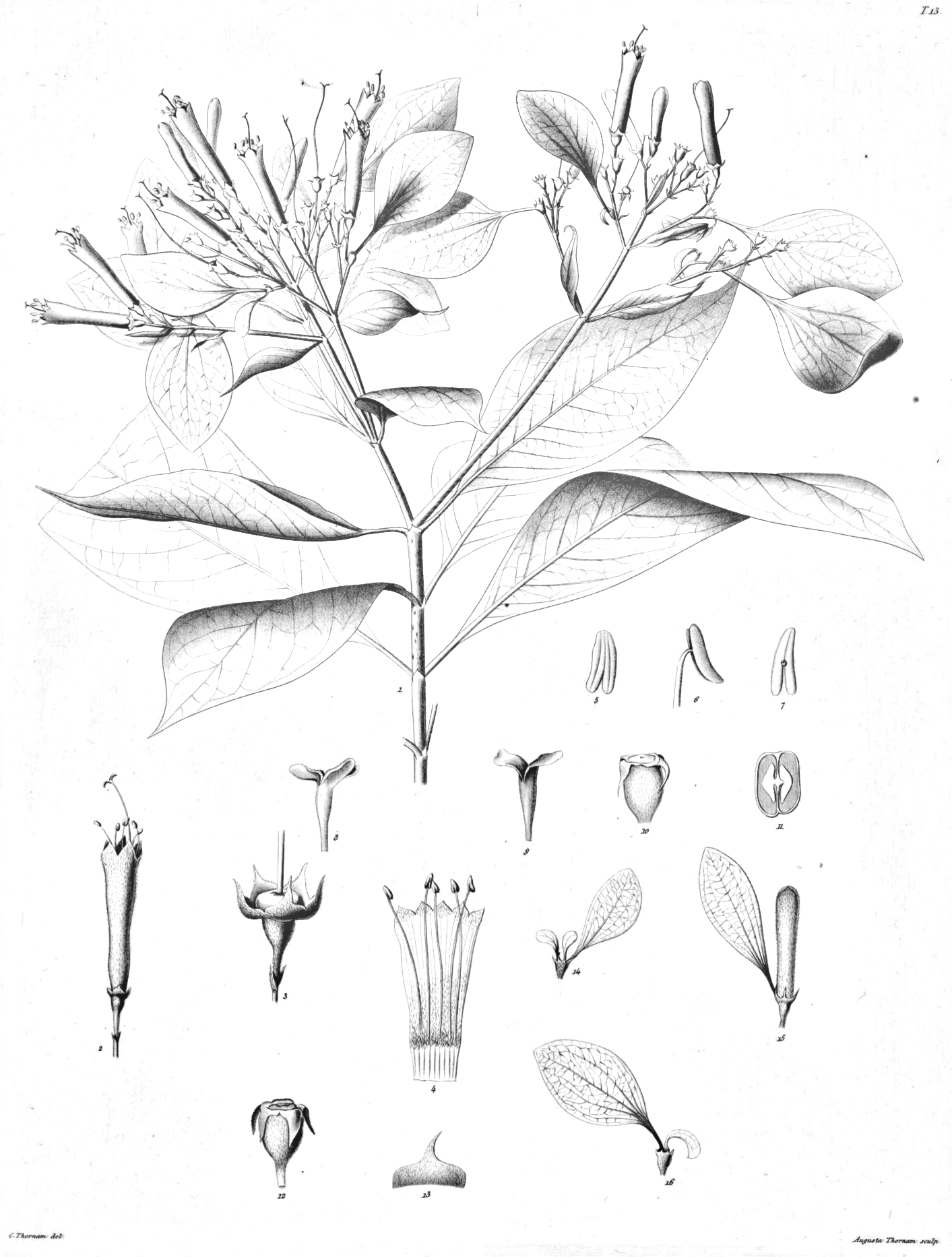
- Pogonopus exsertus

Scientific classification
- Kingdom: Plantae
- Clade: Tracheophytes
- Clade: Angiosperms
- Clade: Eudicots
- Clade: Asterids
- Order: Gentianales
- Family: Rubiaceae
- Subfamily: Ixoroideae
- Tribe: Dialypetalantheae
- Genus: Pogonopus; Klotzsch

= Pogonopus (plant) =

Genus of plants

Pogonopus is a genus of flowering plants belonging to the family Rubiaceae.

Its native range is Tropical America.

Species:

- Pogonopus exsertus (Oerst.) Oerst.
- Pogonopus speciosus (Jacq.) K.Schum.
- Pogonopus tubulosus (A.Rich. ex DC.) K.Schum.
