= Paul Carpenter Standley =

American botanist (1884-1963)

- Born: Avalon, Missouri, United States
- Died: June 2, 1963 (aged 79); Tegucigalpa, Honduras
- Education: Drury College; New Mexico State College
- Scientific career
- Fields: Botany
- Institutions: United States National Museum; Field Museum of Natural History
- Author abbrev. (botany): Standl.

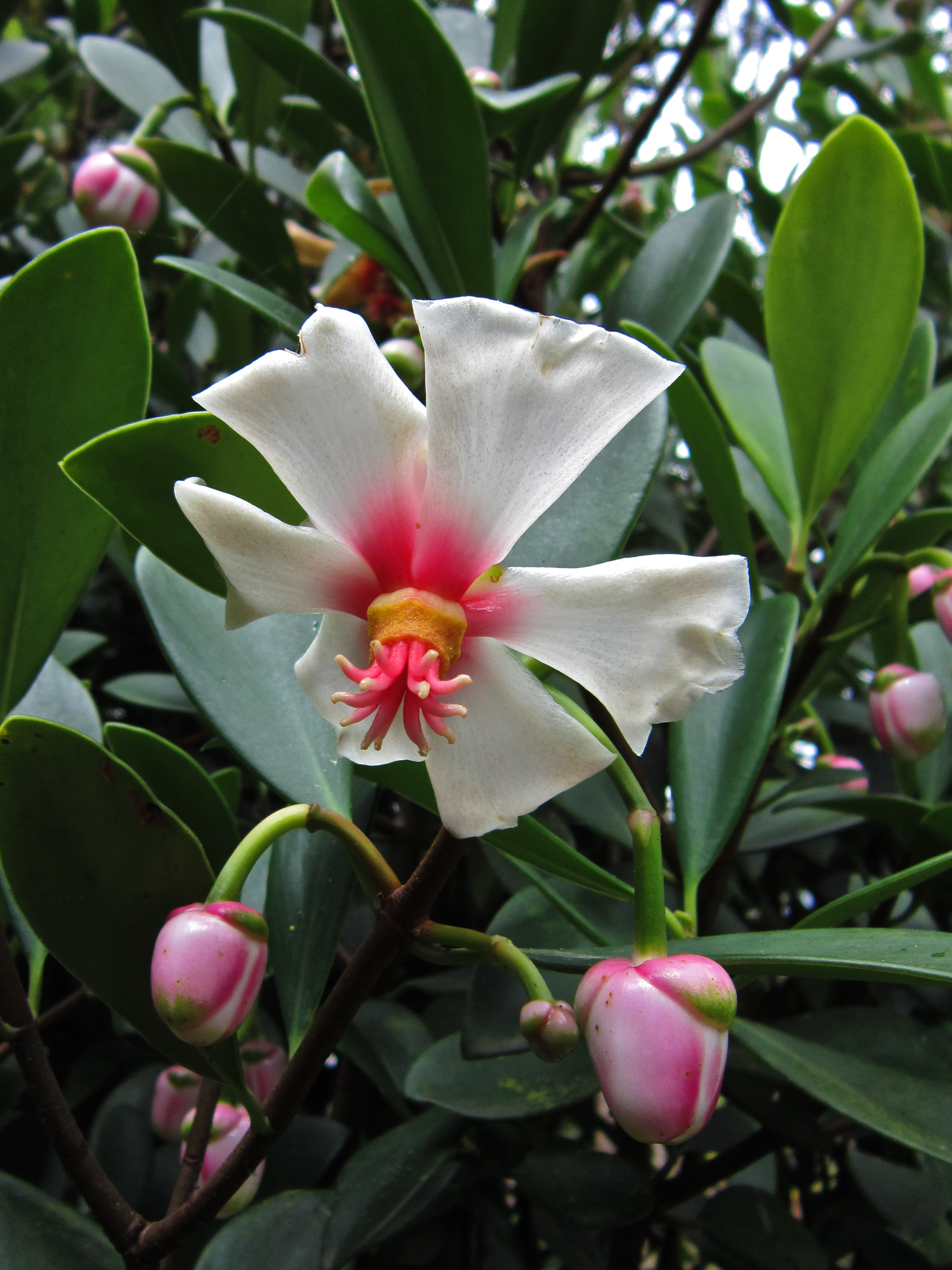
Clusia orthoneura, first described by Paul Carpenter Standley in 1940.

Paul Carpenter Standley (March 21, 1884 – June 2, 1963) was an American botanist known for his work on neotropical plants. He worked at the United States National Museum and the Field Museum of Natural History. While working at the Field Museum, Standley conducted fieldwork in Guatemala. He retired in 1950, and died in 1963. Standley is the namesake of three genera of plants, and several species, including Simira standleyi.

== Early life and education ==
Standley was born on March 21, 1884, in Avalon, Missouri. He attended Drury College in Springfield, Missouri, and New Mexico State College, where he received a bachelor's degree in 1907, and received a master's degree from New Mexico State College in 1908.

== Career ==
He remained at New Mexico State College as an assistant from 1908 to 1909. He was the assistant curator of the Division of Plants at the United States National Museum from 1909 to 1922.

He wrote "Flora of Barro Colorado Island, Panama" in May 1927.

In the spring of 1928, he took a position at the Field Museum of Natural History in Chicago, where worked until 1950. While at the Field Museum he did fieldwork in Guatemala between 1938 and 1941. After his retirement in 1950, he moved to the Escuela Agricola Panamericana in Honduras, where he worked in the library and herbarium and did field work until 1956, when he stopped doing botanical work. In 1957 he moved to Tegucigalpa, Honduras, where he died on June 2, 1963.

He contributed to the Trees and Shrubs of Mexico, Flora of Guatemala, and Flora of Costa Rica.

== Family ==
His sister Penelope "Nellie" Standley was also a botanical collector.

== Honours ==
Three genera of plants have been named after him; in 1932, botanist Alexander Curt Brade published Standleya, which is a genus of flowering plants from Brazil, belonging to the family Rubiaceae. Then in 1971, botanists R.M. King & H. Rob. published Standleyanthus, which is a genus of Central American plants in the boneset tribe within the sunflower family. Lastly in 1993, botanist Frank Almeda published Stanmarkia, which is a genus of flowering plants from Mexico and Guatemala, belonging to the family Melastomataceae. The name also honours another American botanist Julian Alfred Steyermark (1909–1988). He is also honoured in the naming of several species, including Simira standleyi.

There are 6439 names of plant species published by Standl.

== See also ==
Category:Taxa named by Paul Carpenter Standley
