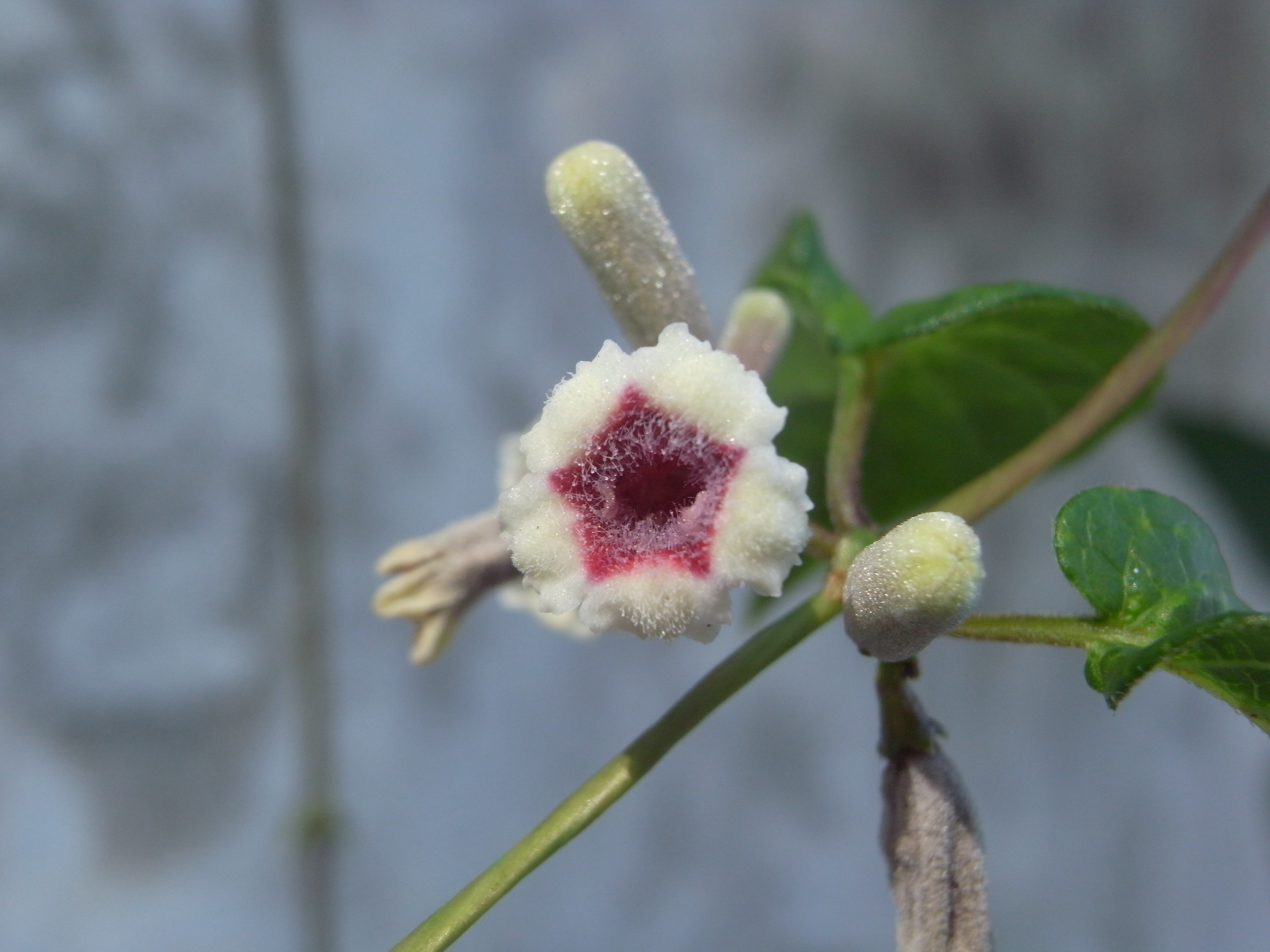
- Paederia scandens

Scientific classification
- Kingdom: Plantae
- Clade: Tracheophytes
- Clade: Angiosperms
- Clade: Eudicots
- Clade: Asterids
- Order: Gentianales
- Family: Rubiaceae
- Subfamily: Rubioideae
- Tribe: Paederieae; DC.

= Paederieae =

Tribe of plants

Paederieae is a tribe of flowering plants in the family Rubiaceae and contains 81 species in 4 genera. Its representatives are found in the tropics and subtropics.

== Genera ==
Currently accepted names

- Leptodermis Wall. (46 sp)
- Paederia L. (33 sp)
- Pseudopyxis Miq. (3 sp)
- Serissa Comm. ex A.Juss. (1 sp)
- Spermadictyon Roxb. (1 sp)

Synonyms

- Buchozia L'Hér. ex Juss. = Serissa
- Daun-Contu Adans. = Paederia
- Democritea DC. = Serissa
- Disodea Pers. = Paederia
- Dysoda Lour. = Serissa
- Hamiltonia Roxb. = Spermadictyon
- Hondbesseion Kuntze = Paederia
- Hondbessen Adans. = Paederia
- Lecontea A.Rich. ex DC. = Paederia
- Lygodisodea Ruiz & Pav. = Paederia
- Reussia Dennst. = Paederia
- Siphomeris Bojer = Paederia
