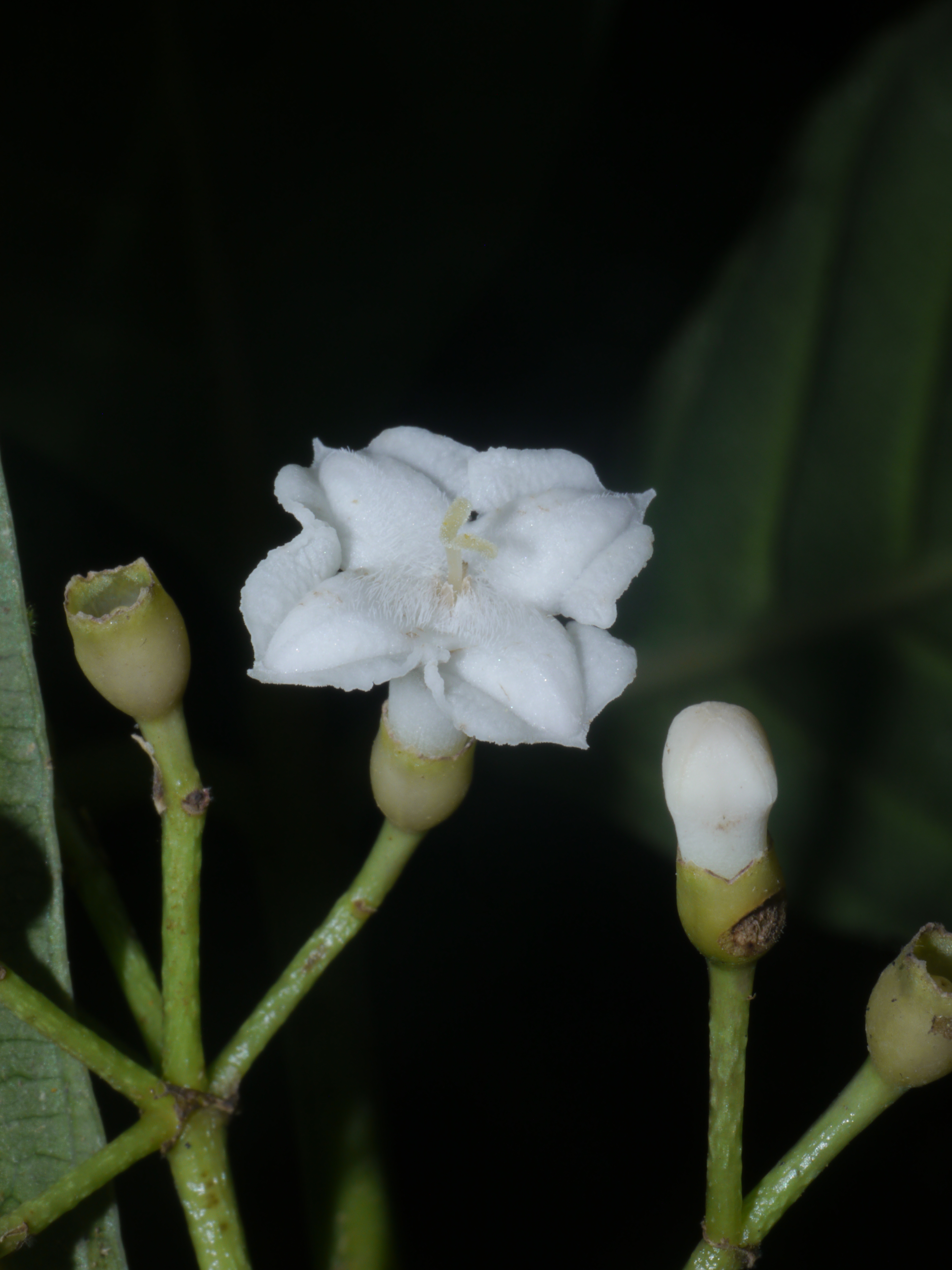
- Saprosma ternatum flower

Scientific classification
- Kingdom: Plantae
- Clade: Tracheophytes
- Clade: Angiosperms
- Clade: Eudicots
- Clade: Asterids
- Order: Gentianales
- Family: Rubiaceae
- Subfamily: Rubioideae
- Tribe: Paederieae
- Genus: Saprosma; Blume

Species
- See text.

Synonyms
- Cleisocratera Korth.; Dysodidendron Gardner; Dysosmia M.Roem.

= Saprosma =

Genus of plants

Saprosma is a genus of flowering plants in the family Rubiaceae. There are about 40 species distributed from south China to tropical Asia.

These are shrubs with opposite or whorled leaves and often an offensive scent. The inflorescence is usually a cluster of white flowers. The fleshy fruit is blue to black in color.

== Species ==
As of January 2023, Plants of the World Online accepted the following species:

- Saprosma anisophylla Merr.
- Saprosma annamensis Pierre ex Pit.
- Saprosma arborea Blume
- Saprosma axilliflora Valeton
- Saprosma beddomei M.Gangop.
- Saprosma borneensis Wernham
- Saprosma brassii Merr. & L.M.Perry
- Saprosma brunnea Craib
- Saprosma chevalieri Pit.
- Saprosma cochinchinensis Pierre ex Pit.
- Saprosma consimilis Kurz
- Saprosma corymbosa (Bedd.) Bedd.
- Saprosma crassipes H.S.Lo
- Saprosma dispar Hassk.
- Saprosma distans Craib
- Saprosma elegans (Korth.) A.P.Davis
- Saprosma foetens (Wight) K.Schum.
- Saprosma fragrans (Bedd.) Bedd.
- Saprosma fruticosa Blume
- Saprosma glomerata (Gardner) Bedd.
- Saprosma glomerulata King & Gamble
- Saprosma gracilis Pit.
- Saprosma hainanensis Merr.
- Saprosma henryi Hutch.
- Saprosma hirsuta Korth.
- Saprosma inaequilonga Pierre ex Pit.
- Saprosma kraussii Rech.
- Saprosma latifolia Craib
- Saprosma longicalyx Craib
- Saprosma longifolia Pit.
- Saprosma membranacea Merr.
- Saprosma parvifolia Craib
- Saprosma philippinensis Elmer
- Saprosma pubescens Ridl.
- Saprosma saxicola Ridl.
- Saprosma scabrida (Thwaites) Bedd.
- Saprosma scortechinii King & Gamble
- Saprosma sogerensis S.Moore
- Saprosma spathulata Valeton
- Saprosma subrepanda (K.Schum. & Lauterb.) Valeton
- Saprosma syzygiifolia Valeton
- Saprosma ternata (Wall.) Hook.f.
- Saprosma urophylla Merr.
- Saprosma verrucosa Pit.
