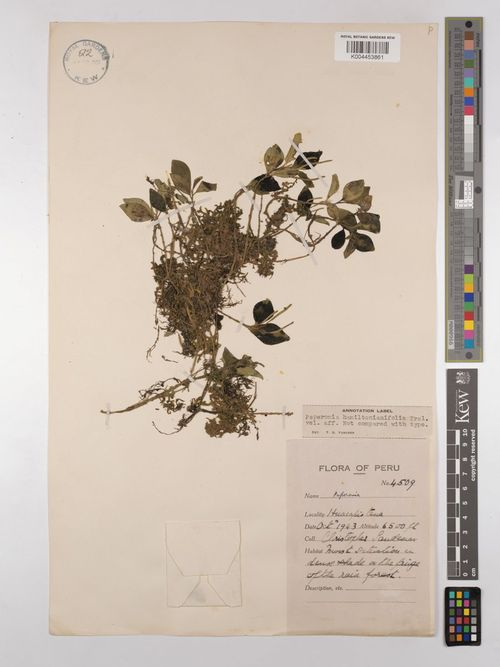

Scientific classification
- Kingdom: Plantae
- Clade: Tracheophytes
- Clade: Angiosperms
- Clade: Magnoliids
- Order: Piperales
- Family: Piperaceae
- Genus: Peperomia
- Species: P. hamiltonianifolia

Binomial name
- Peperomia hamiltonianifolia Trel.

= Peperomia hamiltonianifolia =

Species of flowering plant

Peperomia hamiltonianifolia is a species of epiphyte in the genus Peperomia that is endemic to Peru. It grows on wet tropical biomes. Its conservation status is Threatened.

== Description ==
The type specimen were collected in Peru.

Peperomia hamiltonianifolia is a small, stoloniferous-erect, glabrous herb with a stem about 2 mm thick. The alternate leaves are few in number, elliptic, somewhat acute at both ends, measuring 2–2.5 cm long and about 1 cm wide. When dry, they are thick, and are 5-nerved on the underside. The petiole is 3–5 mm long. The terminal and axillary spikes are 25 mm long and 1 mm thick, borne on a 5 mm peduncle. The round-peltate bracts are comparatively large.

== Taxonomy and naming ==
It was described in 1936 by William Trelease in Publications of the Field Museum of Natural History, Botanical Series 13, from specimens collected by Claude Gay. The epithet hamiltonianifolia means "with leaves like Hamiltonia", referring to the resemblance of its foliage to that genus.

== Distribution and habitat ==
It is endemic to Peru. It grows on an epiphyte environment and is a herb. It grows on wet tropical biomes.

== Conservation ==
This species is assessed as Threatened, in a preliminary report.
