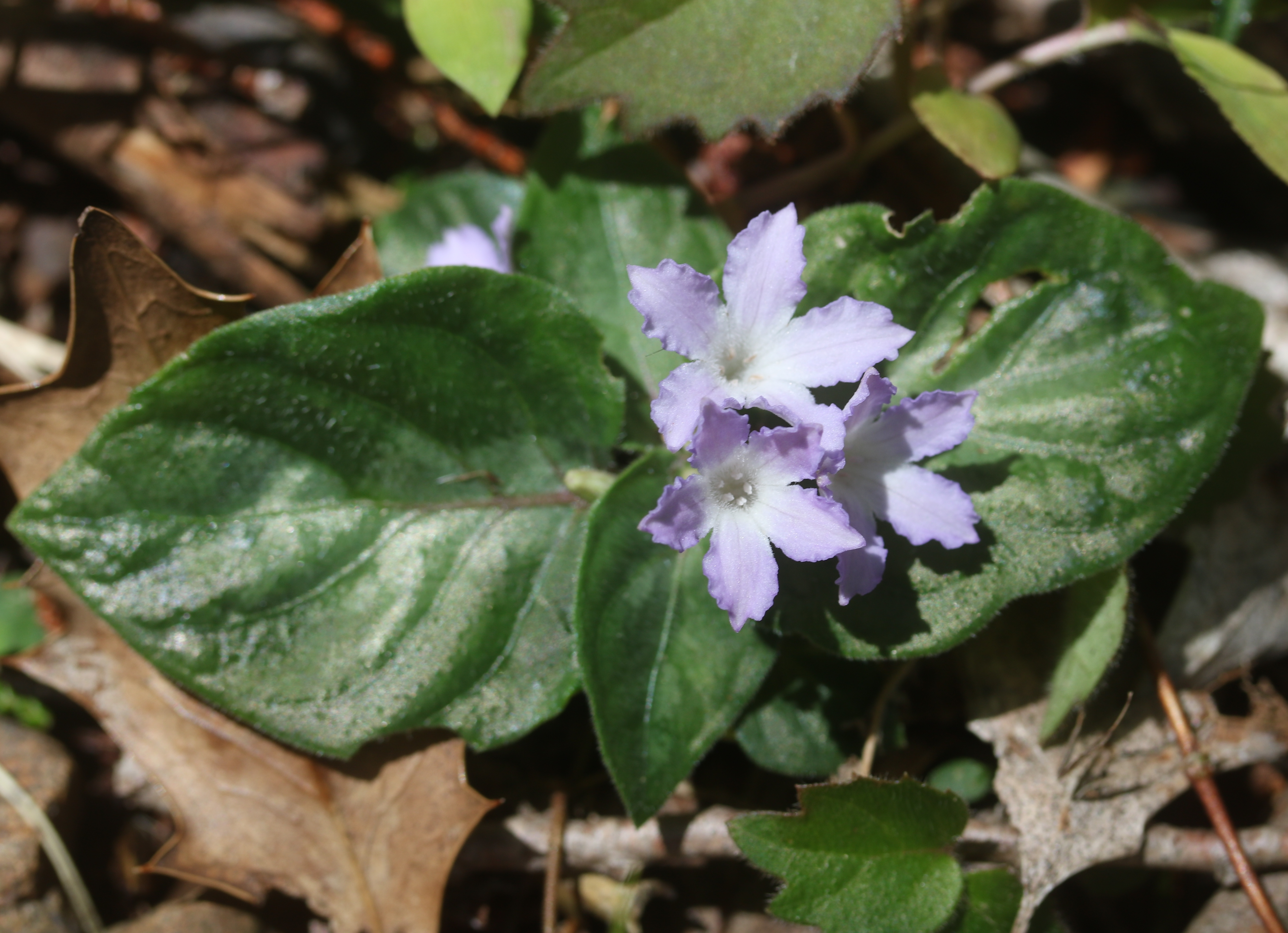

Scientific classification
- Kingdom: Plantae
- Clade: Tracheophytes
- Clade: Angiosperms
- Clade: Eudicots
- Clade: Asterids
- Order: Gentianales
- Family: Rubiaceae
- Genus: Pseudopyxis
- Species: P. depressa

Binomial name
- Pseudopyxis depressa Miq.

= Pseudopyxis depressa =

Species of plant

Pseudopyxis depressa is a species of plant in the family Rubiaceae.
