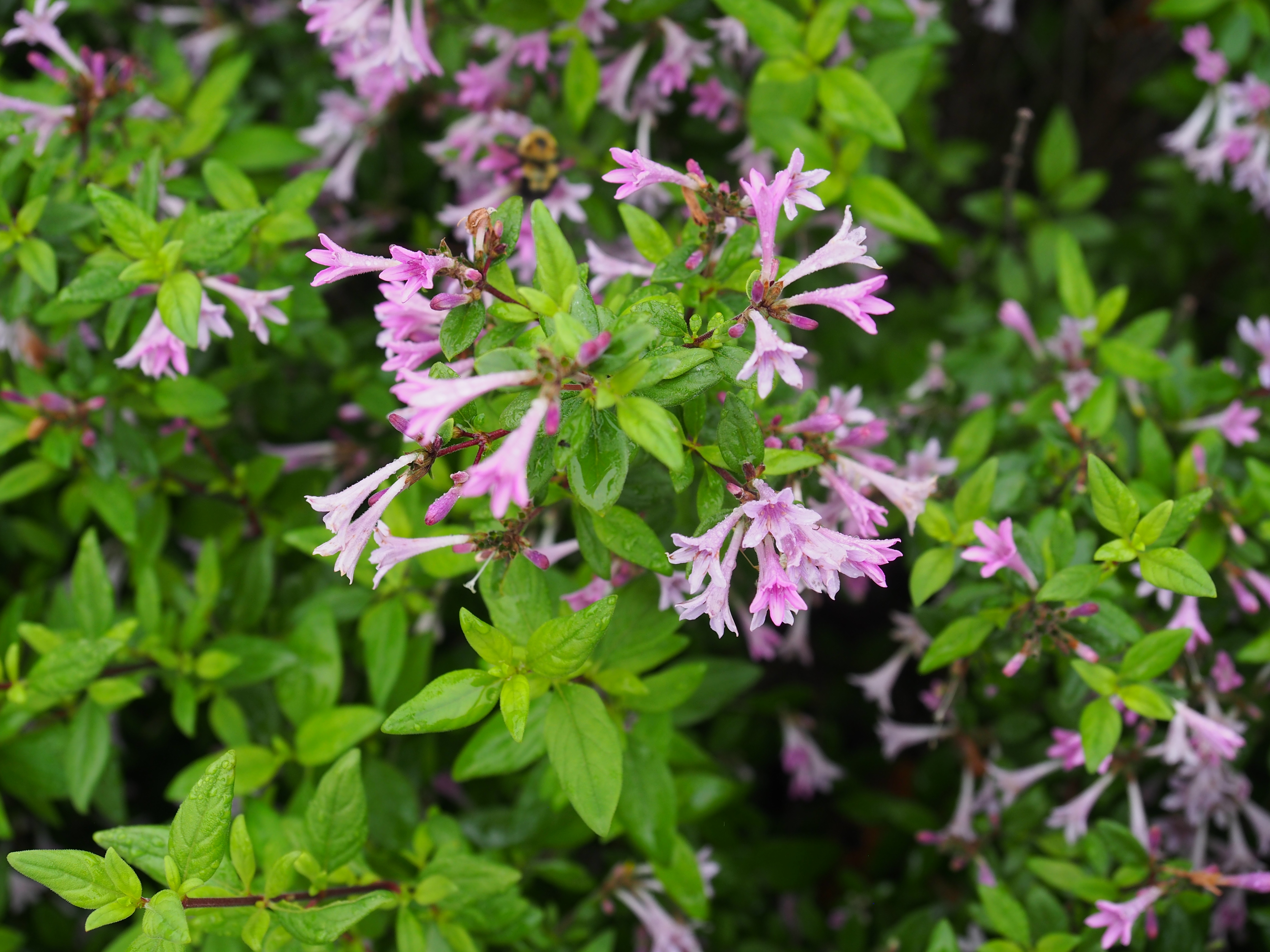
- Flowers
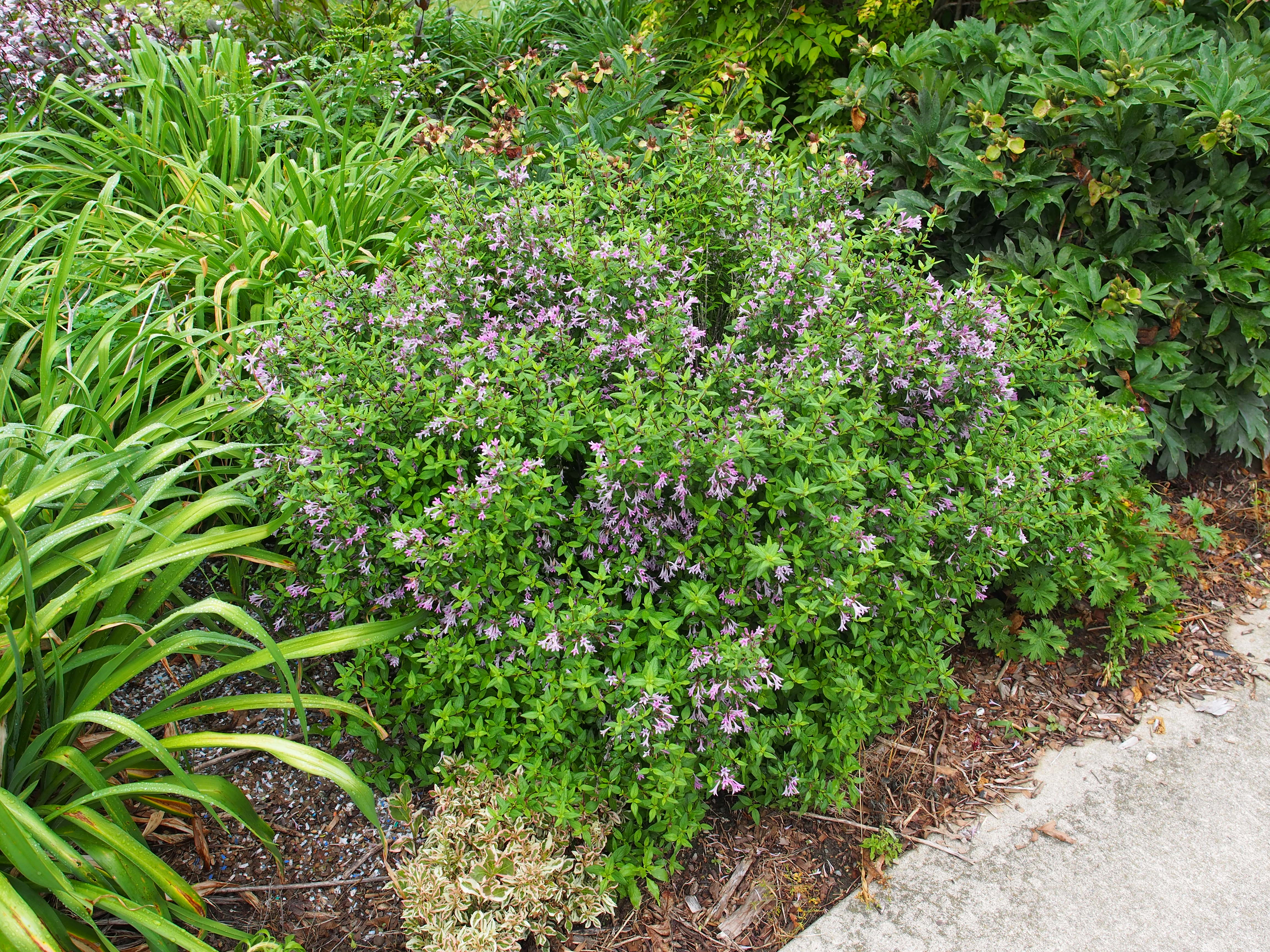
- In a garden setting

Scientific classification
- Kingdom: Plantae
- Clade: Embryophytes
- Clade: Tracheophytes
- Clade: Spermatophytes
- Clade: Angiosperms
- Clade: Eudicots
- Clade: Asterids
- Order: Gentianales
- Family: Rubiaceae
- Genus: Leptodermis
- Species: L. oblonga

Binomial name
- Leptodermis oblonga Bunge

Synonyms
- Hamiltonia oblonga (Bunge) Franch.; Leptodermis chanetii H.Lév.; Leptodermis mongolica Buhse ex K.Schum.; Leptodermis oblonga var. leptophylla H.J.P.Winkl.

= Leptodermis oblonga =

Species of flowering plant

Leptodermis oblonga, the baby lilac shrub, is a species of flowering plant in the family Rubiaceae, native to Mongolia, central China, and northern Vietnam. It is typically found growing in sunny situations on the slopes of hills, along roadsides, and in thickets. A mound-forming deciduous shrub typically 45 cm (18 in) tall and wide but reaching 60 cm (2 ft), it is hardy in USDA zones 5 through 8. There is a cultivar, 'Summer Stars'.
