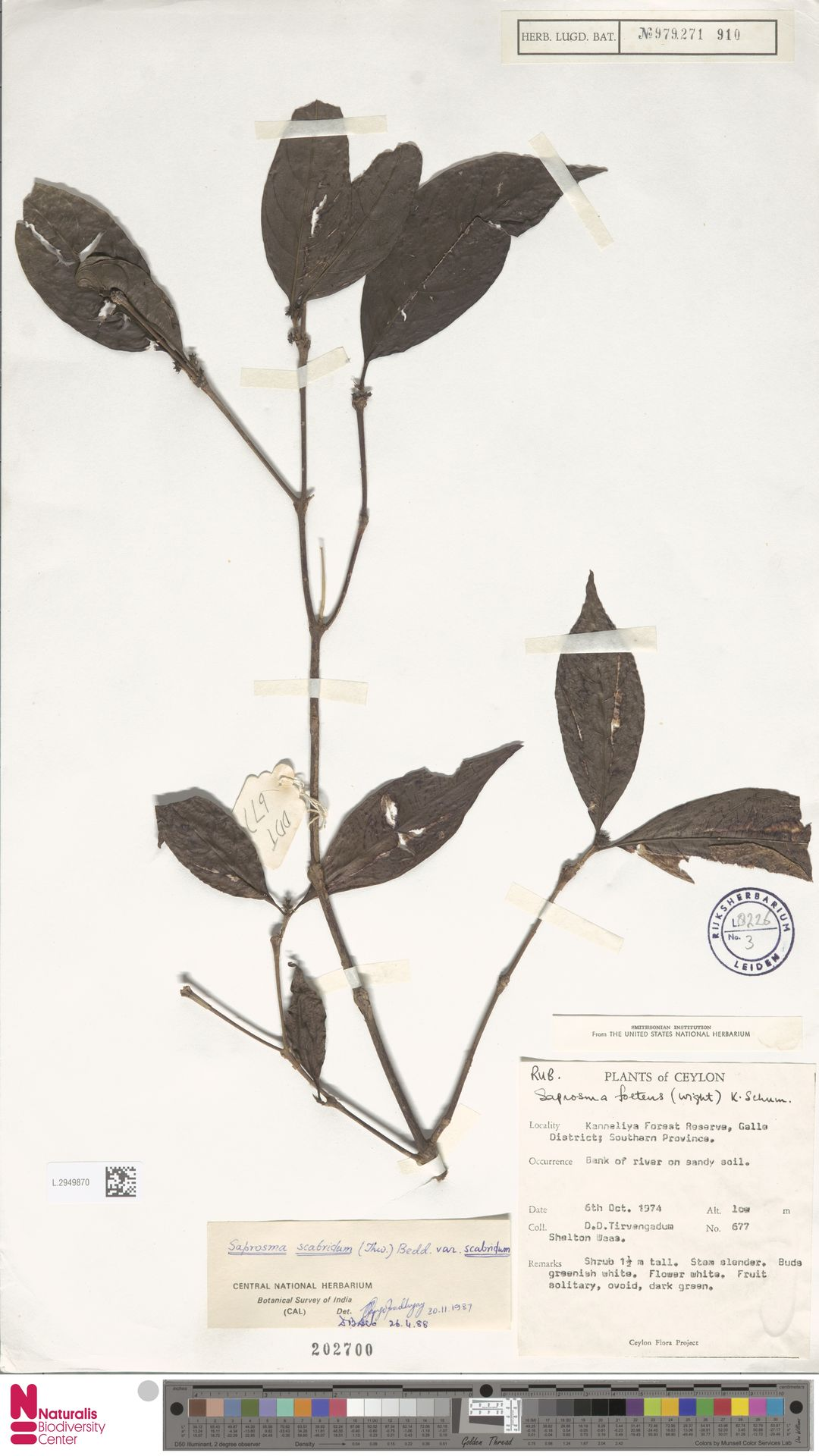

Conservation status
- Endangered (IUCN 2.3)

Scientific classification
- Kingdom: Plantae
- Clade: Tracheophytes
- Clade: Angiosperms
- Clade: Eudicots
- Clade: Asterids
- Order: Gentianales
- Family: Rubiaceae
- Genus: Saprosma
- Species: S. scabrida

Binomial name
- Saprosma scabrida (Thwaites) Beddome

= Saprosma scabrida =

Species of plant

Saprosma scabrida is a species of plant in the family Rubiaceae. It is endemic to Sri Lanka.
