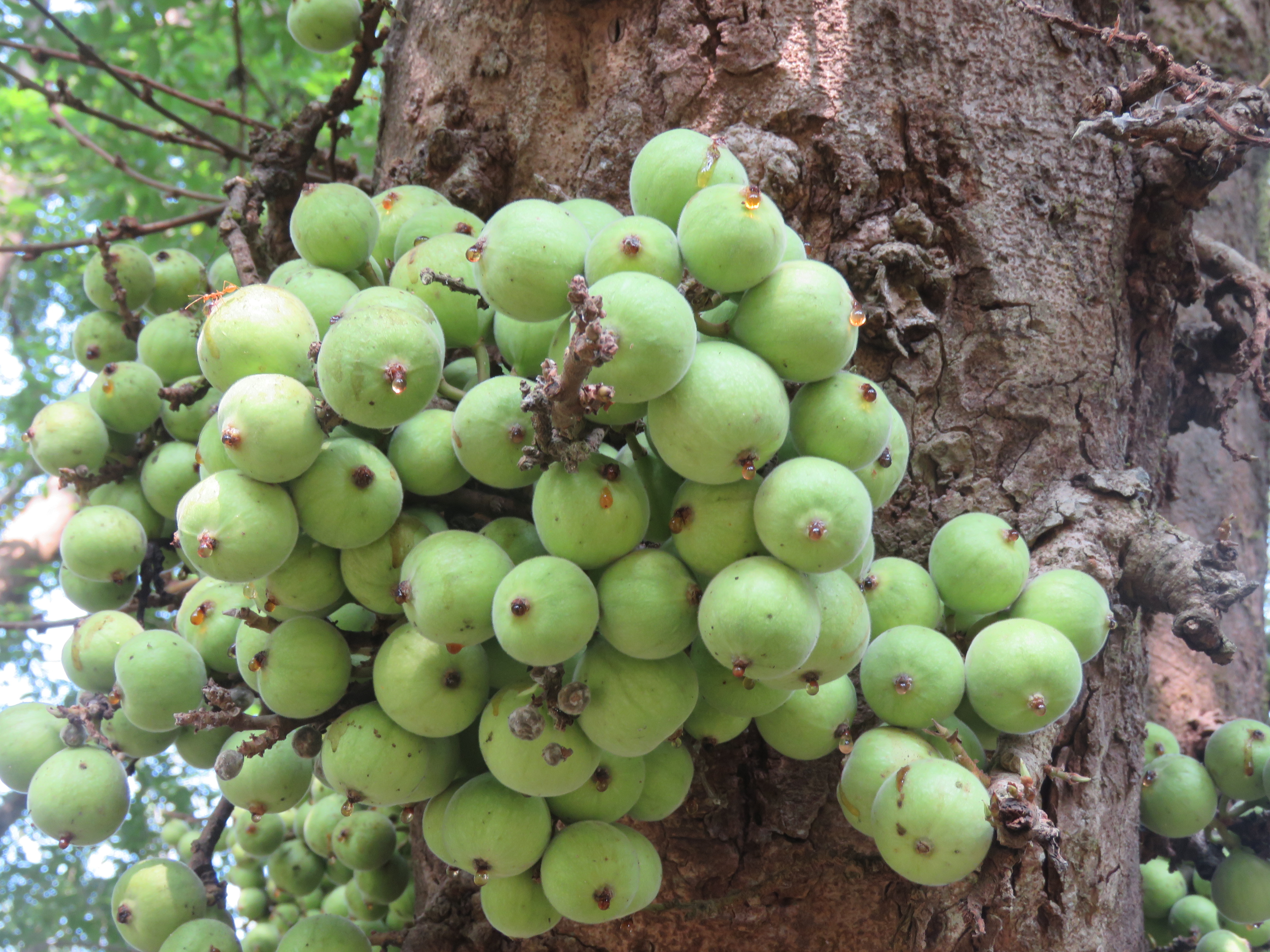

Conservation status
- Least Concern (IUCN 3.1)

Scientific classification
- Kingdom: Plantae
- Clade: Tracheophytes
- Clade: Angiosperms
- Clade: Eudicots
- Clade: Rosids
- Order: Rosales
- Family: Moraceae
- Genus: Ficus
- Subgenus: F. subg. Sycomorus
- Species: F. racemosa

Binomial name
- Ficus racemosa L.

Synonyms
- Synonymy: Covellia glomerata (Roxb.) Miq.; Covellia lanceolata (Buch.-Ham. ex Roxb.) Miq.; Covellia mollis Miq.; Ficus acidula King; Ficus chittagonga Miq.; Ficus glomerata Roxb.; Ficus glomerata var. chittagonga (Miq.) King; Ficus glomerata var. elongata King; Ficus glomerata var. miquelii King; Ficus glomerata var. mollis (Miq.) King; Ficus goolereea Roxb.; Ficus henrici King; Ficus lanceolata Buch.-Ham. ex Roxb.; Ficus leucocarpa (Miq.) Miq.; Ficus lucescens Blume; Ficus mollis (Miq.) Miq., nom. illeg. homonym. post.; Ficus racemosa var. elongata (King) M.F.Barrett; Ficus racemosa var. miquelii (King) Corner; Ficus racemosa var. mollis (Miq.) M.F.Barrett; Ficus racemosa var. vesca (F.Muell. ex Miq.) M.F.Barrett; Ficus semicostata F.M.Bailey; Ficus trichocarpa f. glabrescens Engl.; Ficus vesca F.Muell. ex Miq.; Urostigma leucocarpum Miq.; Urostigma lucescens (Blume) Miq.

= Ficus racemosa =

Species of fig

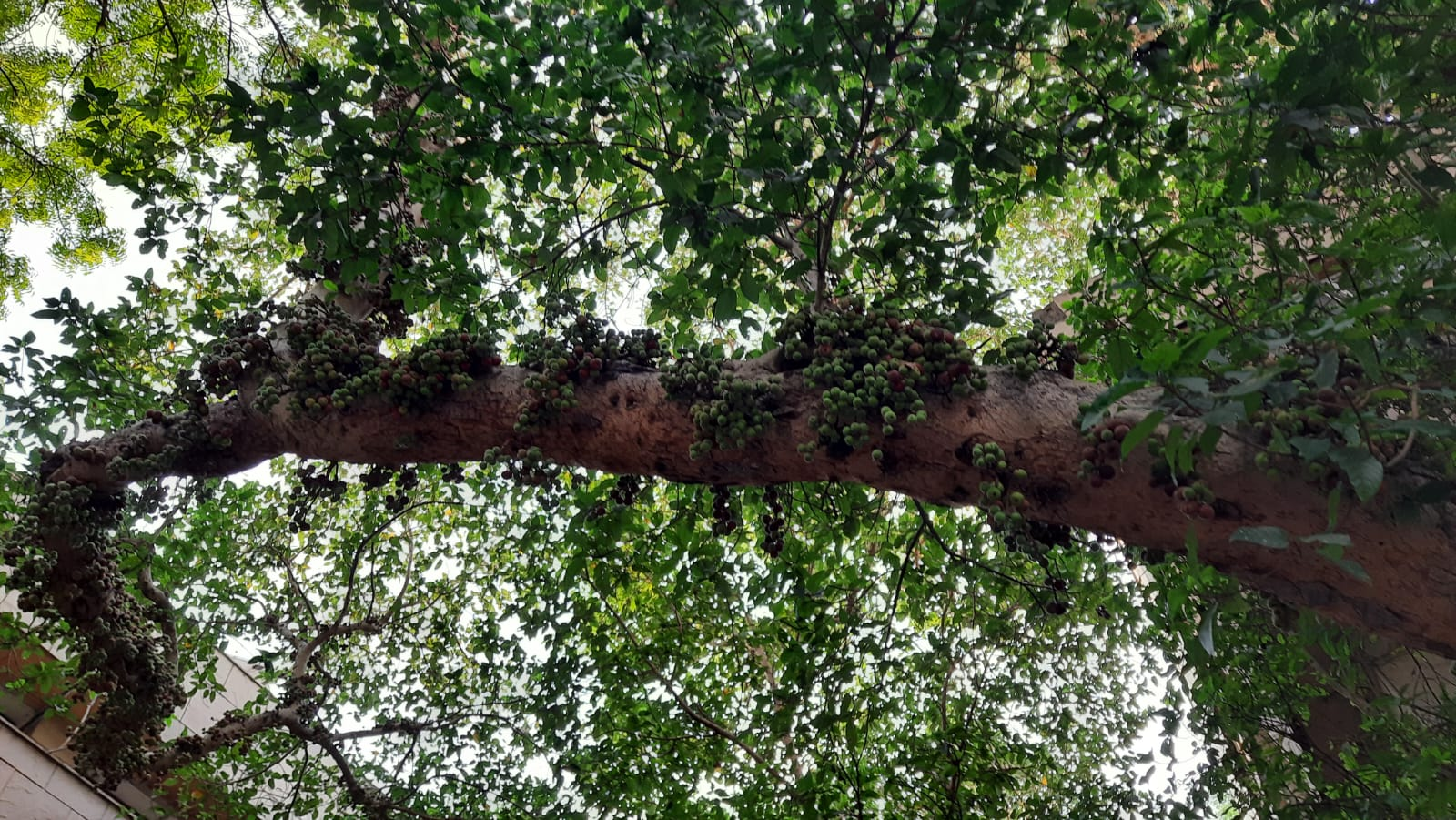
Figs growing all over the tree

Ficus racemosa, the cluster fig, red river fig, udumbara, audumbara, or gular (Hindi: गूलर), is a species of plant in the mulberry family Moraceae. It is native to tropical Asia and Australia. It is a fast-growing plant with large, very coarse leaves, attaining the size of a large shrub or even larger in old specimens. A distinctive feature of its growth habit is the cauliflorous nature of its fruiting, where the syconia (figs) grow in dense clusters directly from the trunk and larger branches. The ripe figs are a favourite food of the rhesus macaque, and the plant also serves as a host for the caterpillars of the two-brand crow butterfly (Euploea sylvester) of northern Australia.

The species is of cultural importance in Hinduism and Buddhism. The tree is also important to the Dusunic peoples of Sabah, Malaysia, where it is called Nunuk Ragang.

== Description ==
The cluster fig is deciduous or semi-deciduous, reaching 15–20 metres (49–66 ft) in height. Older specimens can grow quite large and gnarled, up to 30 metres (98 ft) high. It has a wide-spreading crown with irregular branches and a thick, often buttressed trunk covered in smooth greyish bark that may flake with age. Like other species in the genus Ficus, the tree produces milky latex which can irritate the skin. The tree has a shallow and extensive root system, often developing aerial roots in humid environments.

The leaves of the cluster fig are simple and alternate, with lanceolate stipules measuring 1–2 centimetres (0.39–0.79 in) in length that are pubescent and often persistent on young shoots. The petiole is slender, grooved along the upper side, 1–5 centimetres (0.39–1.97 in) long, and becomes brown and scurfy with age. The leaf blade (lamina) ranges from 6–15 centimetres (2.4–5.9 in) long and 3.5–6 centimetres (1.4–2.4 in) wide, and ovate, obovate, elliptic-oblong or elliptic-lanceolate in shape. The surface is membranous and glabrous, often developing a blistered appearance upon drying.

The flowers are unisexual and borne within a syconium, developing on short leafless branches, warty tubercles of the trunk or larger branches. The syconia are subglobose to pear-shaped, attached by a stout peduncle. Fig wasps such as Ceratosolen sp. pollinate the flowers by entering the ostiole, which is flat or slightly sunken. The mature syconium measures about 3 centimetres (1.2 in) in diameter and turns orange or dark crimson when ripe, containing granulate achenes.

== Distribution ==
The cluster fig is native to South Asia, Southeast Asia and northern Australia, with a natural range extending from Pakistan, India, Sri Lanka, Nepal and Bangladesh through Myanmar, Thailand, Laos, Cambodia, Vietnam, southern China, Malaysia and Indonesia, and eastwards to Papua New Guinea and northern Australia. It thrives in tropical and subtropical climates, commonly found in lowland forests, riverbanks and open woodlands, as well as in rural villages and temple grounds, where it is often cultivated for its religious significance, shade and edible figs.

The species grows well in moist, well-drained soils, tolerating both periodic flooding and dry conditions, and can often be seen along roadsides and near watercourses.

== In Hinduism ==
According to the Shatapatha Brahmana, the Udumbara tree was created from the force of Indra, the leader of the gods that came out of his flesh when he overindulged in soma:

From his hair his thought flowed, and became millet; from his skin his honour flowed, and became the aśvattha tree (Ficus religiosa); from his flesh his force flowed, and became the udumbara tree (Ficus glomerata); from his bones his sweet drink flowed, and became the nyagrodha tree (Ficus indica); from his marrow his drink, the Soma juice, flowed, and became rice: in this way his energies, or vital powers, went from him.

In the Atharva Veda, this fig tree (Sanskrit: Umbara or Audumbara) is given prominence as a means for acquiring prosperity and vanquishing foes. For instance, regarding an amulet of the Udumbara tree, a hymn (AV xix, 31) extols:

The Lord of amulets art thou, most mighty: in the wealth's

ruler that engendered riches,
These gains are lodged in the, and all great treasures. Amulet,
conquer thou: far from us banish malignity and indigence,
and hunger.

Vigour art thou, in me do thou plant vigour: riches art thou, so

do thou grant me riches.
Plenty art thou, so prosper me with plenty: House-holder, hear
a householder's petition.

It has been described in the story of Raja Harischandra of the Ikshvaku dynasty, that the crown was a branch of this Udumbara tree, set in a circlet of gold. Additionally, the throne (simhasana) was constructed out of this wood and the royal personage would ascend it on his knee, chanting to the gods to ascend it with him, which they did so, albeit unseen.

The tree is revered as the sacred abode under which Lord Dattatreya imparted his teachings that true wisdom begins with learning from others, regardless of their stature or status. His philosophy teaches that there is always something to be learned from everyone, and that growth requires the ability to unlearn old knowledge as times change. The tree is commonly planted at sites associated with Lord Dattatreya, the Hindu Trimurti consisting of Brahma, Vishnu and Shiva, symbolising the continuous cycle of creation, preservation and destruction. Its leaves are also considered sacred and are an indispensable element in many Hindu fire rituals.

== In Buddhism ==
Both the tree and the flower are referred to as the Udumbara (Sanskrit, Pali; Devanagari: औदुंबर) in Buddhism. Udumbara can also refer to the blue lotus (nila-udumbara, "blue udumbara") flower. The udumbara flower appears in chapters 2 and 27 of the Lotus Sutra, an important Mahayana Buddhist text. The Japanese word udonge (優曇華, literally "udon/udumbara flower") was used by Dōgen Zenji to refer to the flower of the udumbara tree in chapter 68 of the Shōbōgenzō ("Treasury of the Eye of the True Dharma"). Dōgen places the udonge in the context of the Flower Sermon given by Gautama Buddha on Vulture Peak. Udonge is also used to refer to the eggs of the lacewing insect. The eggs are laid in a pattern similar to a flower, and its shape is used for divination in Asian fortune telling.

In Theravada Buddhism, the plant is said to have used as the tree for achieved enlightenment (bodhi) by the 26th Buddha, Koṇāgamana (Sinhala: කෝණාගම).

== Uses ==
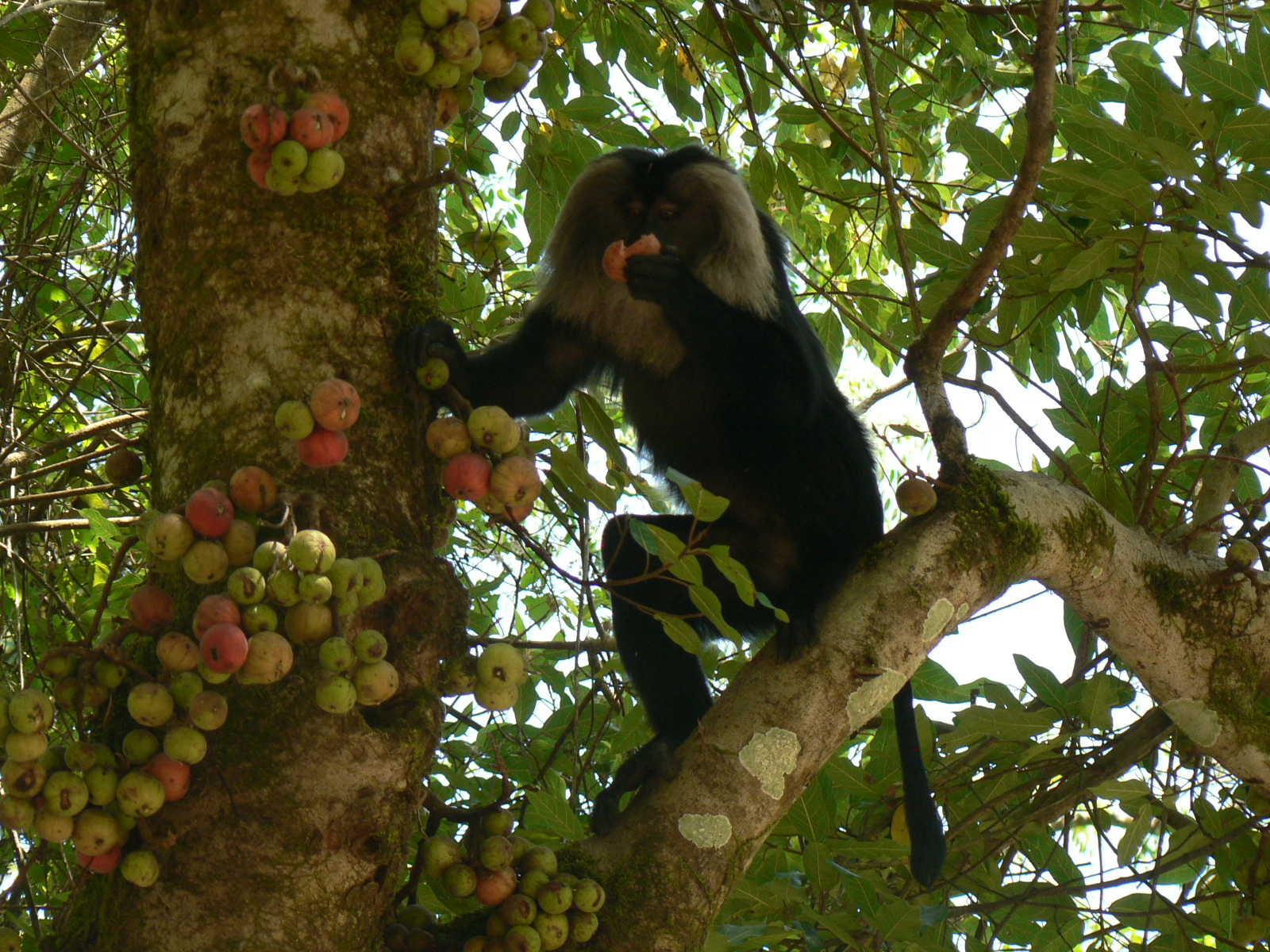
Lion-tailed macaque feeding on a fig

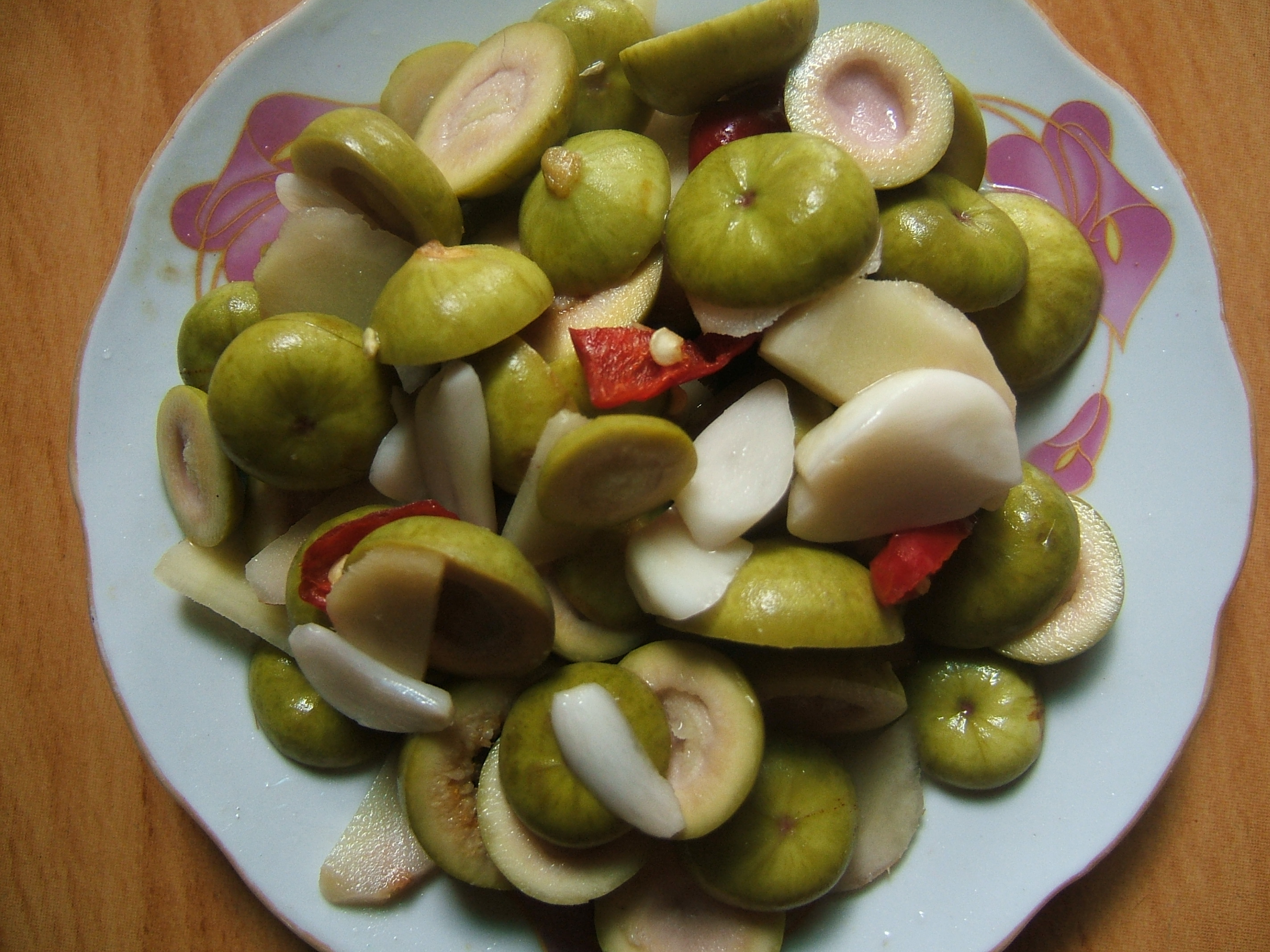
Pickled and halved quả sung figs in Vietnam

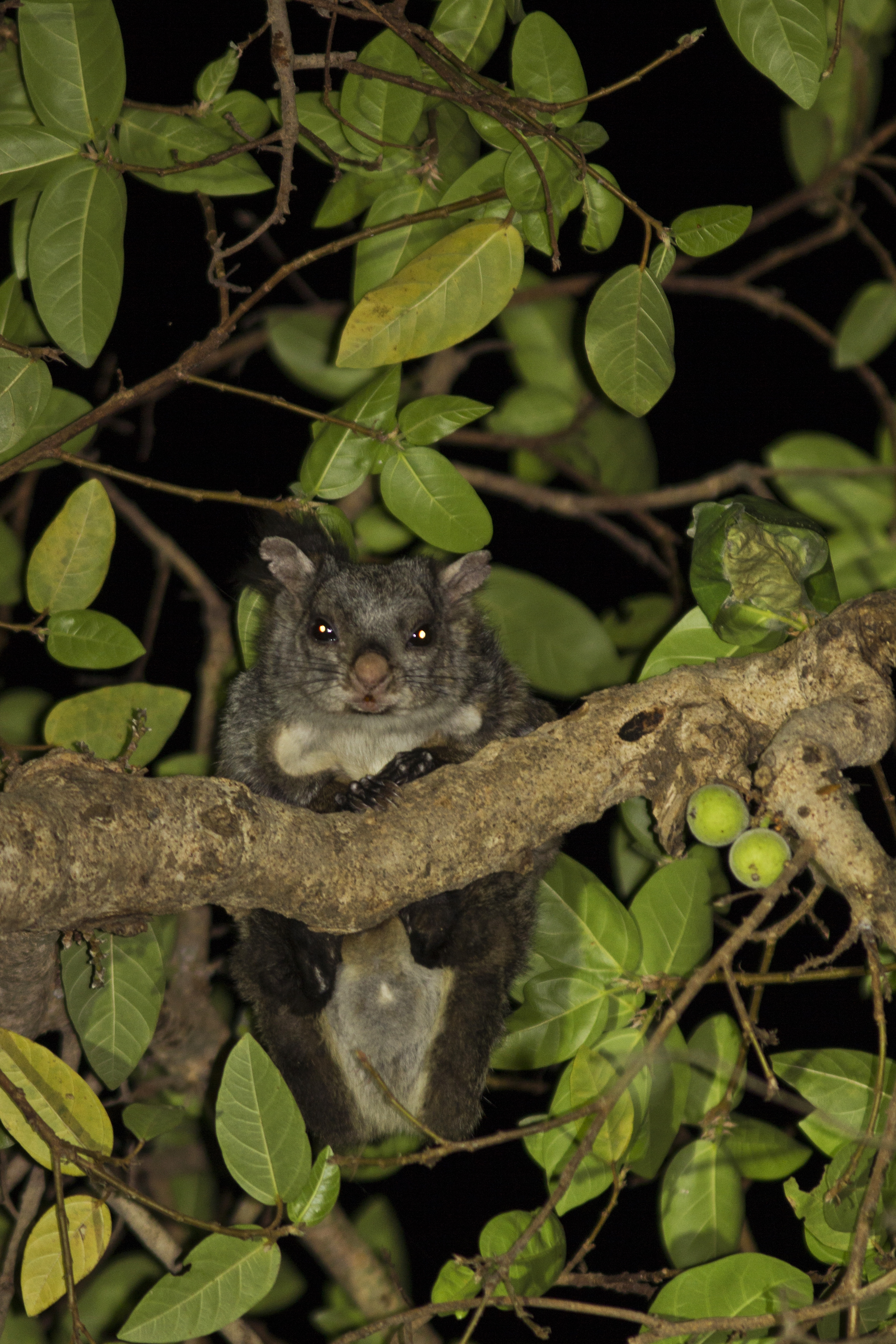
Indian Giant Flying Squirrel feeding on figs at Polo forest, Gujarat, India

The figs can be eaten when ripe, or used while still green as a vegetable in stir-fries and curries, or made into preserves. The shoots and young leaves are also edible. The Ovambo people call the fruit of the cluster fig eenghwiyu and use it to distill ombike, a traditional liquor.

In India, a home remedy is prepared by rubbing the bark on a stone with water to make a poultice to treat boils and mosquito bites. The poultice is left to dry on the skin and reapplied after a few hours. The leaves of the plant can also be used to remove caterpillar hairs lodged in the skin. The affected skin is rubbed lightly with a leaf, effectively dislodging the stinging hairs.

The leaves are called lá sung in Vietnam, where they are eaten raw with meat dishes. They are used with rice paper and edible leaves of other plants, such as woolly sewervine, shiso or Ming aralia, to wrap pieces of chicken, pork or goat and eaten in a style similar to the Korean ssam. The figs, called quả sung, are harvested while still green and pickled in a mixture of salt and sugar, then seasoned with chilli, garlic, lime juice and fish sauce.
