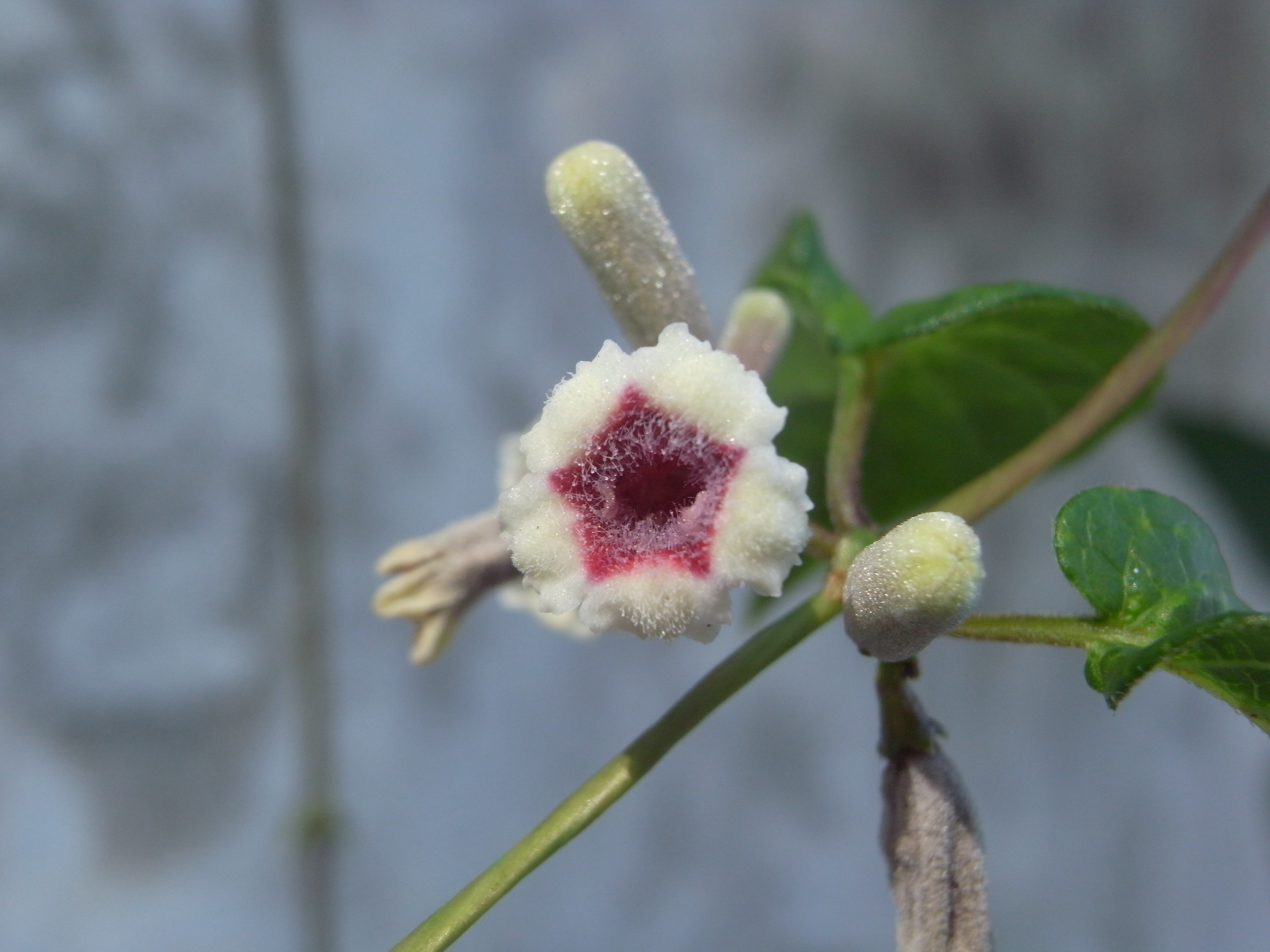
- Paederia foetida

Scientific classification
- Kingdom: Plantae
- Clade: Tracheophytes
- Clade: Angiosperms
- Clade: Eudicots
- Clade: Asterids
- Order: Gentianales
- Family: Rubiaceae
- Subfamily: Rubioideae
- Tribe: Paederieae
- Genus: Paederia; L.

Species
- See text

Synonyms
- Daun-contu Adans.; Disodea Pers.; Hondbessen Adans.; Lecontea A.Rich.; Lygodisodea Ruiz & Pav.; Reussia Dennst., nom. inval.; SiphomerisBojer

= Paederia =

Genus of plants

Paederia is a genus of flowering plants in the madder family, Rubiaceae. They are commonly known as sewer vines because of the strong odours exuded when their leaves or stems are crushed or bruised.

== Species ==
- Paederia brasiliensis (Hook.f.) Puff (South America)
- Paederia bojeriana Hochr.
- Paederia cruddasiana Prain – Sewervine (Asia)
- Paederia farinosa (Baker) Puff
- Paederia foetida L. (syn. Paederia scandens) – Skunkvine (Asia)
- Paederia lanata Puff
- Paederia lanuginosa Wall.
- Paederia linearis Hook.f.
- Paederia majungensis Homolle ex Puff
- Paederia mandrarensis Homolle ex Puff
- Paederia pilifera Hook.f.
- Paederia pospischilii K.Schum.
- Paederia sambiranensis Homolle ex Puff
- Paederia taolagnarensis Razafim. & C.M. Taylor
- Paederia thouarsiana Baill.
