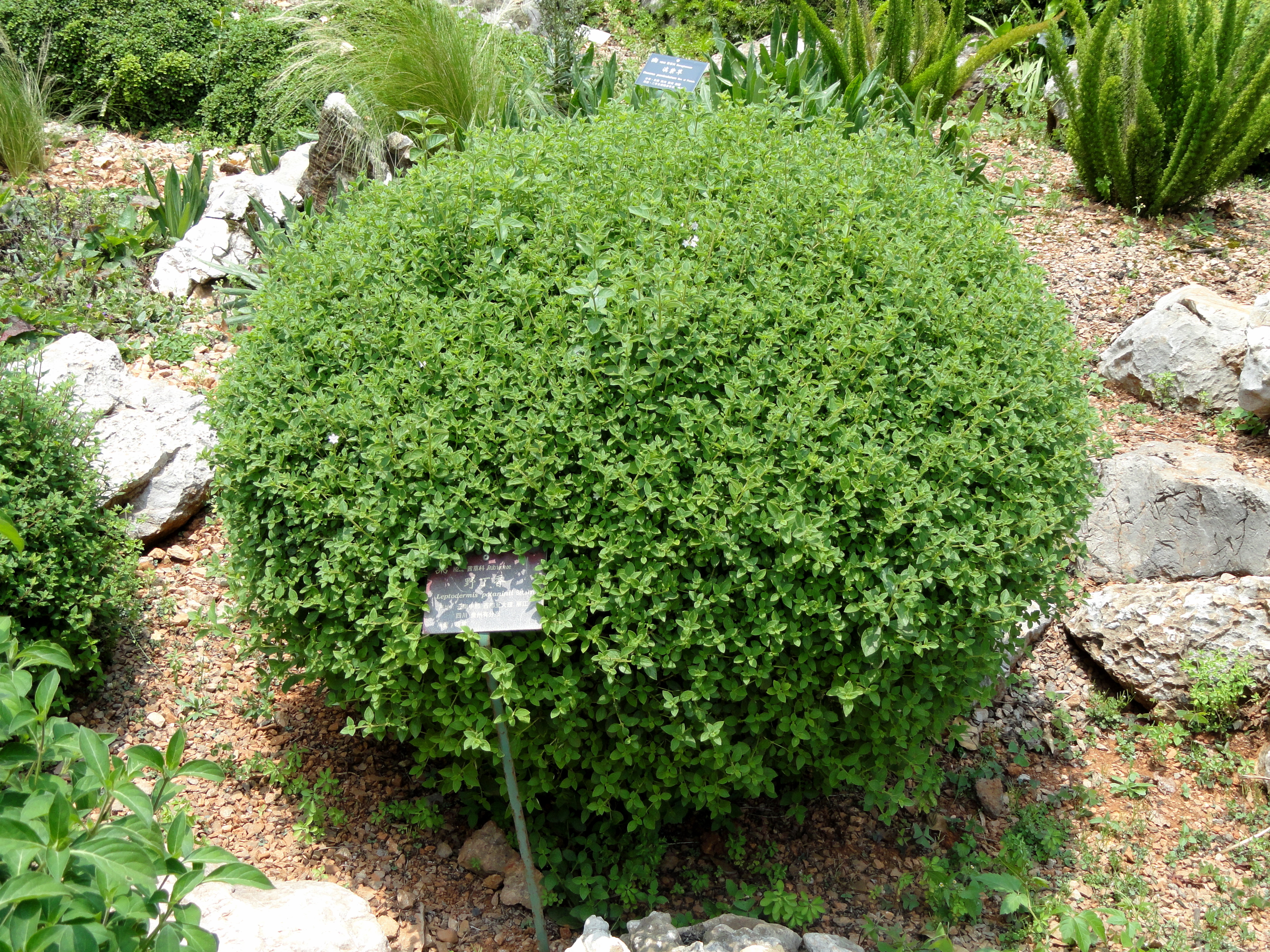

Scientific classification
- Kingdom: Plantae
- Clade: Tracheophytes
- Clade: Angiosperms
- Clade: Eudicots
- Clade: Asterids
- Order: Gentianales
- Family: Rubiaceae
- Subfamily: Rubioideae
- Tribe: Paederieae
- Genus: Leptodermis; Wall.

= Leptodermis =

Genus of plants

Leptodermis is a genus of plants in the family Rubiaceae.

== Species ==
- Leptodermis amoena
- Leptodermis beichuanensis
- Leptodermis brevisepala
- Leptodermis buxifolia
- Leptodermis crassifolia
- Leptodermis dielsiana
- Leptodermis diffusa
- Leptodermis forrestii
- Leptodermis glomerata
- Leptodermis gracilis
- Leptodermis griffithii
- Leptodermis handeliana
- Leptodermis hirsutiflora
- Leptodermis kumaonensis
- Leptodermis lanata
- Leptodermis lanceolata
- Leptodermis lecomtei
- Leptodermis limprichtii
- Leptodermis ludlowii
- Leptodermis oblonga
- Leptodermis ordosica
- Leptodermis ovata
- Leptodermis parkeri
- Leptodermis parvifolia
- Leptodermis pilosa
- Leptodermis potaninii
- Leptodermis pulchella
- Leptodermis pumila
- Leptodermis purdomii
- Leptodermis rehderiana
- Leptodermis riparia
- Leptodermis scabrida
- Leptodermis schneideri
- Leptodermis scissa
- Leptodermis stapfiana
- Leptodermis tomentella
- Leptodermis trifida
- Leptodermis umbellata
- Leptodermis wardii
- Leptodermis velutiniflora
- Leptodermis vestita
- Leptodermis wilsonii
- Leptodermis virgata
- Leptodermis xizangensis
- Leptodermis yui
