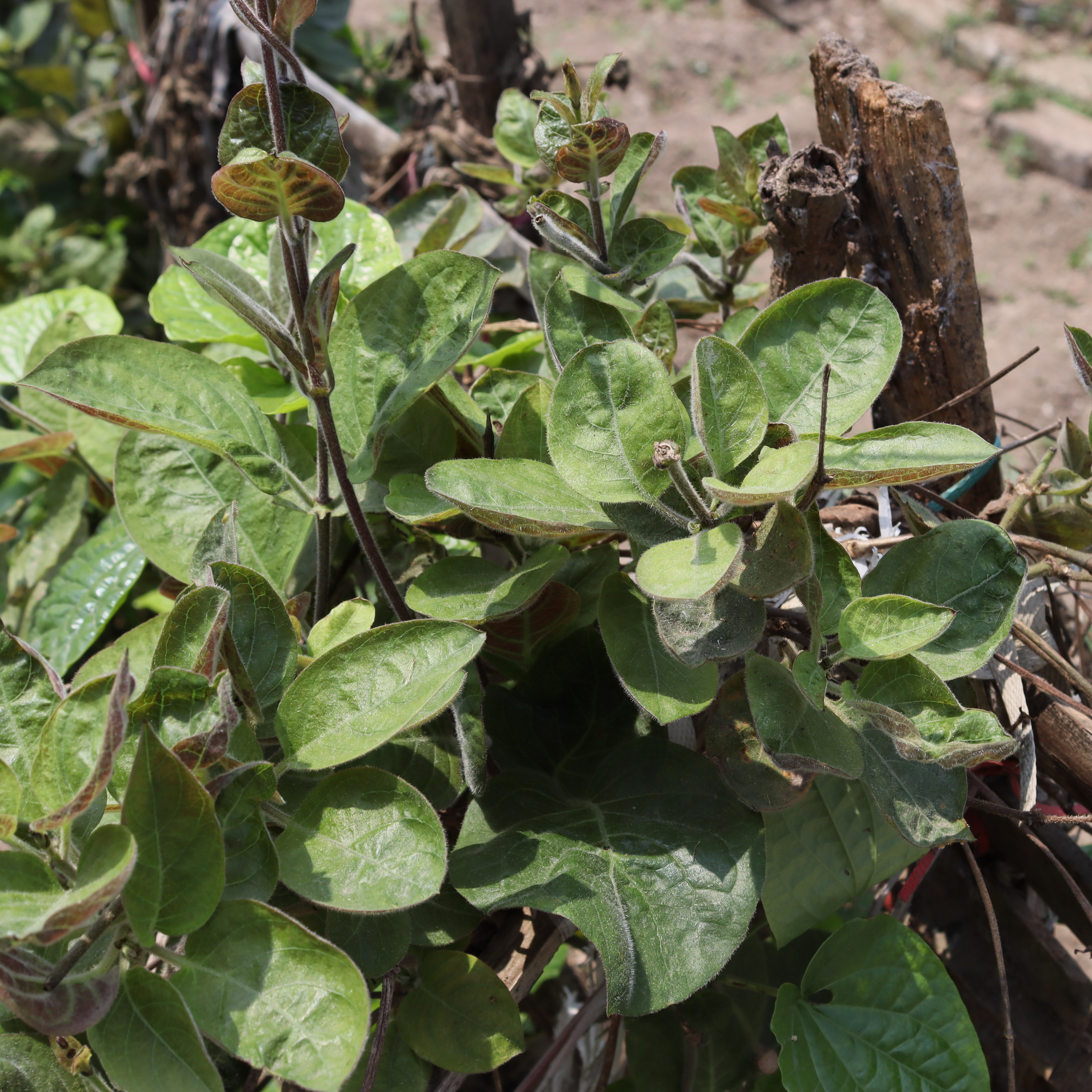

Scientific classification
- Kingdom: Plantae
- Clade: Tracheophytes
- Clade: Angiosperms
- Clade: Eudicots
- Clade: Asterids
- Order: Gentianales
- Family: Rubiaceae
- Genus: Paederia
- Species: P. lanuginosa

Binomial name
- Paederia lanuginosa Wall.

Synonyms
- Paederia macrocarpa Wall. ex G.Don; Hondbesseion lanuginosum (Wall.) Kuntze

= Paederia lanuginosa =

Species of plant

Paederia lanuginosa is a species of climbing vine in the coffee family Rubiaceae, native to Southeast Asia and southern China. Common names include woolly sewervine, cheese leaf and skunkvine, due to the distinctive odour released when the plant is damaged. Closely related to a similarly odorous plant P. foetida, it is cultivated both for its medicinal uses and as a culinary herb throughout its native range.

== Description ==
Paederia lanuginosa is a perennial woody vine with a climbing or twining growth habit, typical of many tropical Rubiaceae species. The vine often uses trees, fences or shrubs for support. If no support is available, it forms dense groundcover mats. Mature vines can reach 3–5 metres (9.8–16.4 ft), sometimes longer, depending on growing conditions.

The leaves have an opposite arrangement along the stem and are typically ovate to lanceolate in shape. The adaxial (upper) surface of the leaf is bright to deep green, while the abaxial (lower) surface is deep purple. Both surfaces are covered in fine, soft hairs, hence the species name lanuginosa which means "woolly". When damaged, the leaves release several volatile sulfur-containing compounds including methanethiol, typical of the genus Paederia.

The flowers are small, tubular and typically borne in loose clusters at the ends of branches or in the leaf axils, appearing from July to October. The corolla comprises five white, light pink or light purple petals and a deep violet throat. The purple calyx and outer surfaces of the corolla are covered with fine hairs. Flowering generally occurs during the warmer humid months, followed by the development of small, brown ovoid-oblong capsules that contain black seeds.

== Distribution ==
Paederia lanuginosa is native to tropical and subtropical Southeast Asia, specifically Vietnam, Thailand and Myanmar, in addition to Yunnan province of China, Bangladesh and Northeast India. It is also grown outside its native range in Europe, Australia and the Pacific islands.

Paederia lanuginosa thrives in warm, humid tropical and subtropical climates. The vine grows wild along forest edges, thickets, roadsides and riverbanks. It is also cultivated in home gardens as a potherb and an ornamental, particularly in Vietnam and Thailand where it is seen climbing on trellises, fences or larger plants. Well-drained, fertile soil and partial shade are preferred; full sun may cause the plant to wilt. The rainy season is especially favourable to vigorous new growth, while the plant is semi-dormant in cooler, drier periods.

== Uses ==
In Vietnamese cuisine, the fresh raw leaves are eaten as a vegetable. Known as lá mơ lông or lá mơ tam thể in Vietnamese, the leaves are eaten with grilled, rich, oily or fermented foods such as nem chua, along with leaves of the cluster fig and Ming aralia. The leaves are believed to stimulate digestion when eaten with such foods. The leaves are also sautéed, lightly boiled or beaten with eggs to make omelettes. The taste and smell of the leaves have been likened to boiled eggs and Camembert cheese.

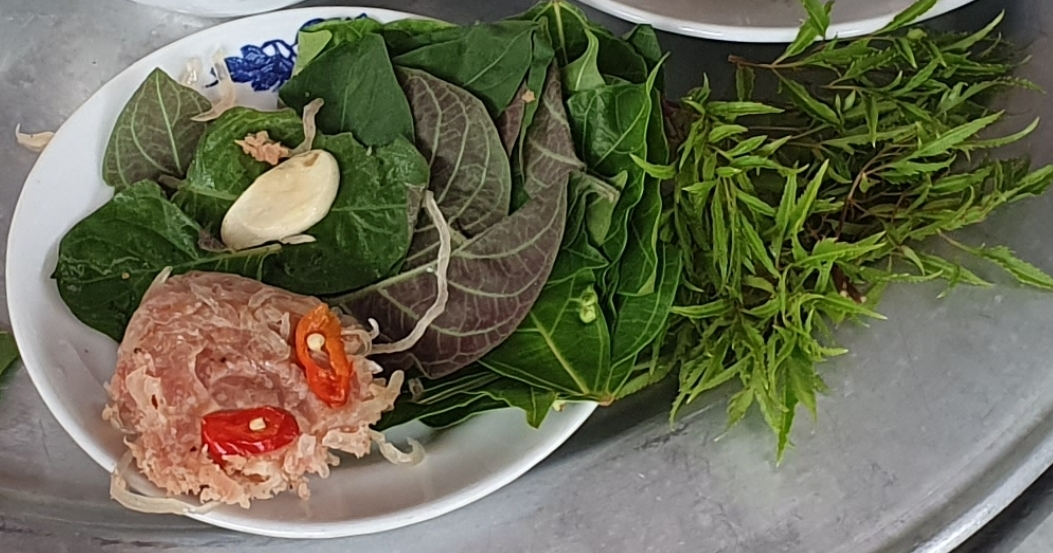
Lá mơ lông served with nem chua, alongside cluster fig and Ming aralia leaves

The plant has a long history of use in traditional medicine in Vietnam, where it is commonly used to relieve indigestion, bloating, diarrhoea and intestinal discomfort. The leaves are often consumed during heavy or fermented meals to aid digestion. Juice of the crushed leaves is applied to the skin to treat rashes. Modern phytochemical studies have identified iridoid glycosides, flavonoids and sulfur compounds in the leaves, which may contribute to the plant’s antioxidant, antibacterial and anti-inflammatory activity, providing some scientific evidence for its traditional medicinal value.
