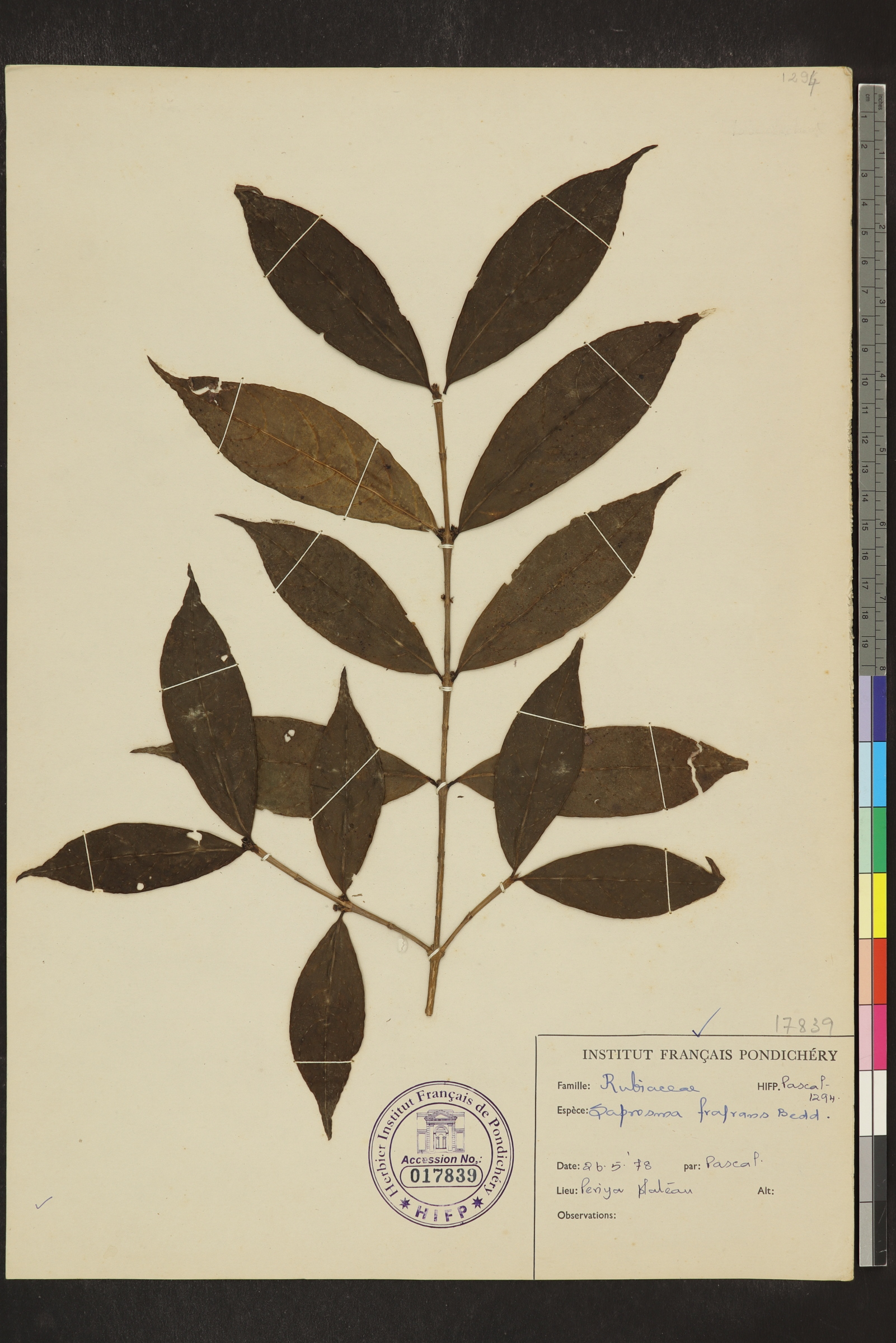

Conservation status
- Vulnerable (IUCN 2.3)

Scientific classification
- Kingdom: Plantae
- Clade: Tracheophytes
- Clade: Angiosperms
- Clade: Eudicots
- Clade: Asterids
- Order: Gentianales
- Family: Rubiaceae
- Genus: Saprosma
- Species: S. fragrans

Binomial name
- Saprosma fragrans (Bedd.) Bedd.

Synonyms
- Serissa fragrans Bedd.

= Saprosma fragrans =

Species of plant

Saprosma fragrans is a species of plant in the family Rubiaceae. It is endemic to the region of Assam.
