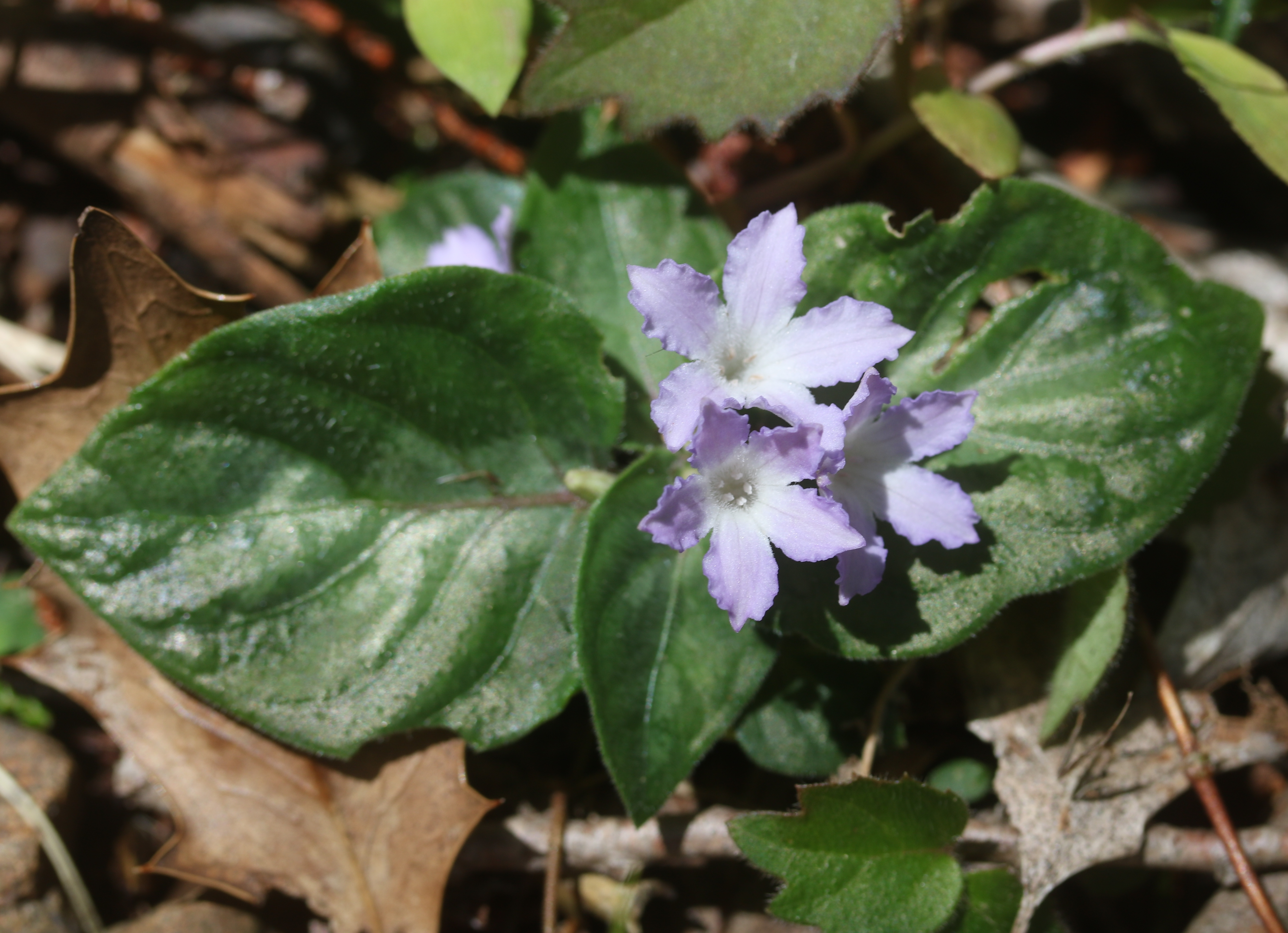
- Pseudopyxis depressa

Scientific classification
- Kingdom: Plantae
- Clade: Tracheophytes
- Clade: Angiosperms
- Clade: Eudicots
- Clade: Asterids
- Order: Gentianales
- Family: Rubiaceae
- Genus: Pseudopyxis; Miq.

= Pseudopyxis =

Genus of plants

Pseudopyxis is a genus of flowering plants belonging to the family Rubiaceae.

Its native range is Southeastern China, Japan.

== Species ==
Species:

- Pseudopyxis depressa Miq.
- Pseudopyxis heterophylla (Miq.) Maxim.
- Pseudopyxis monilirhizoma Tao Chen
