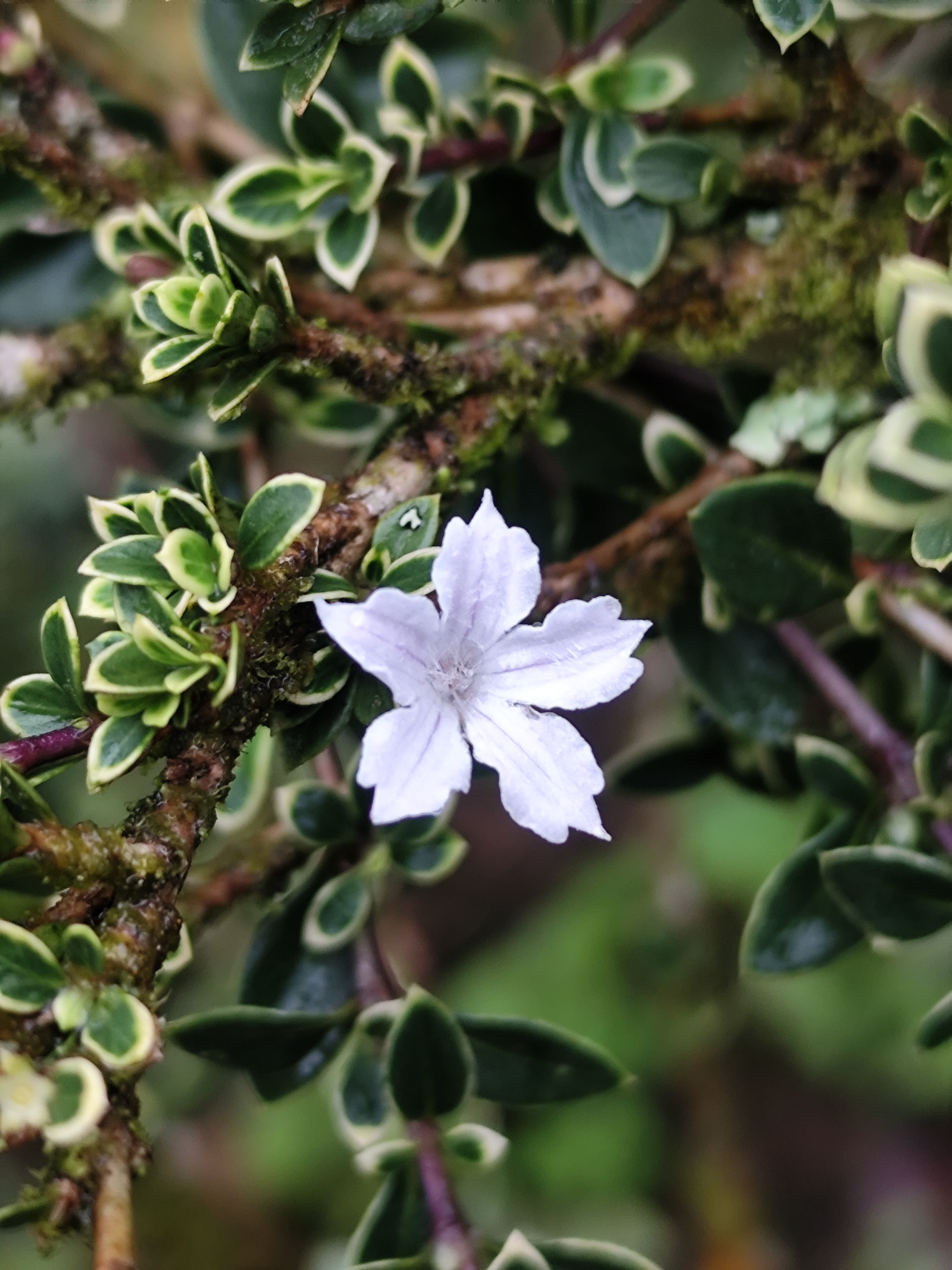

Scientific classification
- Kingdom: Plantae
- Clade: Tracheophytes
- Clade: Angiosperms
- Clade: Eudicots
- Clade: Asterids
- Order: Gentianales
- Family: Rubiaceae
- Genus: Serissa; Comm. ex A.Juss. (1789), nom. cons. prop.
- Species: S. japonica

Binomial name
- Serissa japonica (Thunb.) Thunb. (1798)

Synonyms
- Buchozia {{L'Hér. (1788)}}; Democritea DC. (1830); Dysoda Lour. (1790); Buchozia coprosmoides L'Hér. (1788), nom. superfl.; Buchozia japonica (Thunb.) Callm. (2021); Democritea serissoides DC. (1830); Dysoda fasciculata Lour. (1790); Dysoda foetida (L.f.) Salisb. (1796); Leptodermis nervosa Hutch. (1916); Leptodermis venosa Craib. (1916); Lycium foetidum L.f. (1782); Lycium japonicum Thunb. (1780) (basionym); Serissa buxifolia Dum.Cours. (1811), nom. superfl.; Serissa crassiramea (Maxim.) Nakai (1922); Serissa democritea Baill. (1880); Serissa foetida (L.f.) Poir. (1819); Serissa japonica (Thunb.) Thunb. (1798); Serissa kawakamii Hayata (1915); Serissa myrtifolia Dum.Cours. (1801), nom. superfl.; Serissa serissoides (DC.) Druce (1917)

= Serissa =

Species of flowering plant

Serissa japonica is a species of flowering plants in the family Rubiaceae. It is the sole species in genus Serissa. It is native to open sub-tropical woodlands and wet meadows in southeast Asia, from India, and China to Japan. It is commonly called the snowrose, tree of a thousand stars, or Japanese boxthorn. Snowrose and tree of a thousand stars are different cultivars. The only method of differentiating is measuring the difference in the shape and size of the flowers produced.

== Description ==
Timelapse of a Buchozia japonica flower opening.

Serissa japonica is an evergreen or semi-evergreen shrub, 45–60 cm high, with oval, deep green, rather thick leaves that have an unpleasant smell if bruised (hence one of its synonyms, foetida). The upright stems branch in all directions and form a wide bushy dome. It is grown for its neat habit, good coverage of branches and long flowering time. It is also valued for its rough, grey trunk which tends to get lighter in colour with age.

It flowers practically all year round, but particularly from early spring to near autumn. The 4- to 6-lobed flowers are funnel-shaped and 1 cm wide. They first appear as pink buds but turn to a profusion of white flowers. Fertilizing is especially important during the long flowering period.

== Cultivars ==
Many cultivars with double flowers or variegated leaves are also available. 'Pink Snow Rose' has pale pink flowers and leaves edged off-white. Other cultivars include: 'Variegata', 'Variegated Pink', 'Pink Mystic', 'Snowflake', 'Snowleaves', 'Mt. Fuji', 'Kyoto' and 'Sapporo'.

== Bonsai ==
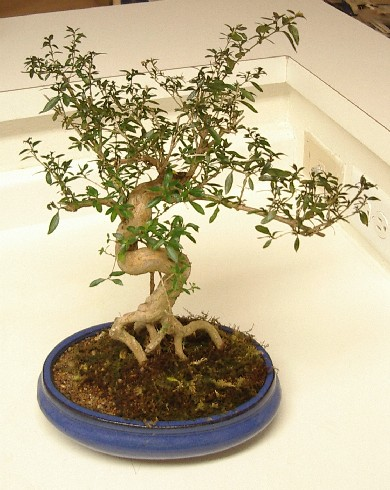
Bonsai version of Serissa japonica

Serissa japonica is one of the most common bonsai sold in America and Europe. It is not difficult to maintain as bonsai, but is very fussy. Many beginner bonsai enthusiasts will destroy a plant in their uninformed attempts to care for it. The trees respond adversely by dropping leaves if over-watered, under-watered, if it's too cold, too hot, or even if just moved to a new location. The plant usually grows back to health when put back to better conditions.
