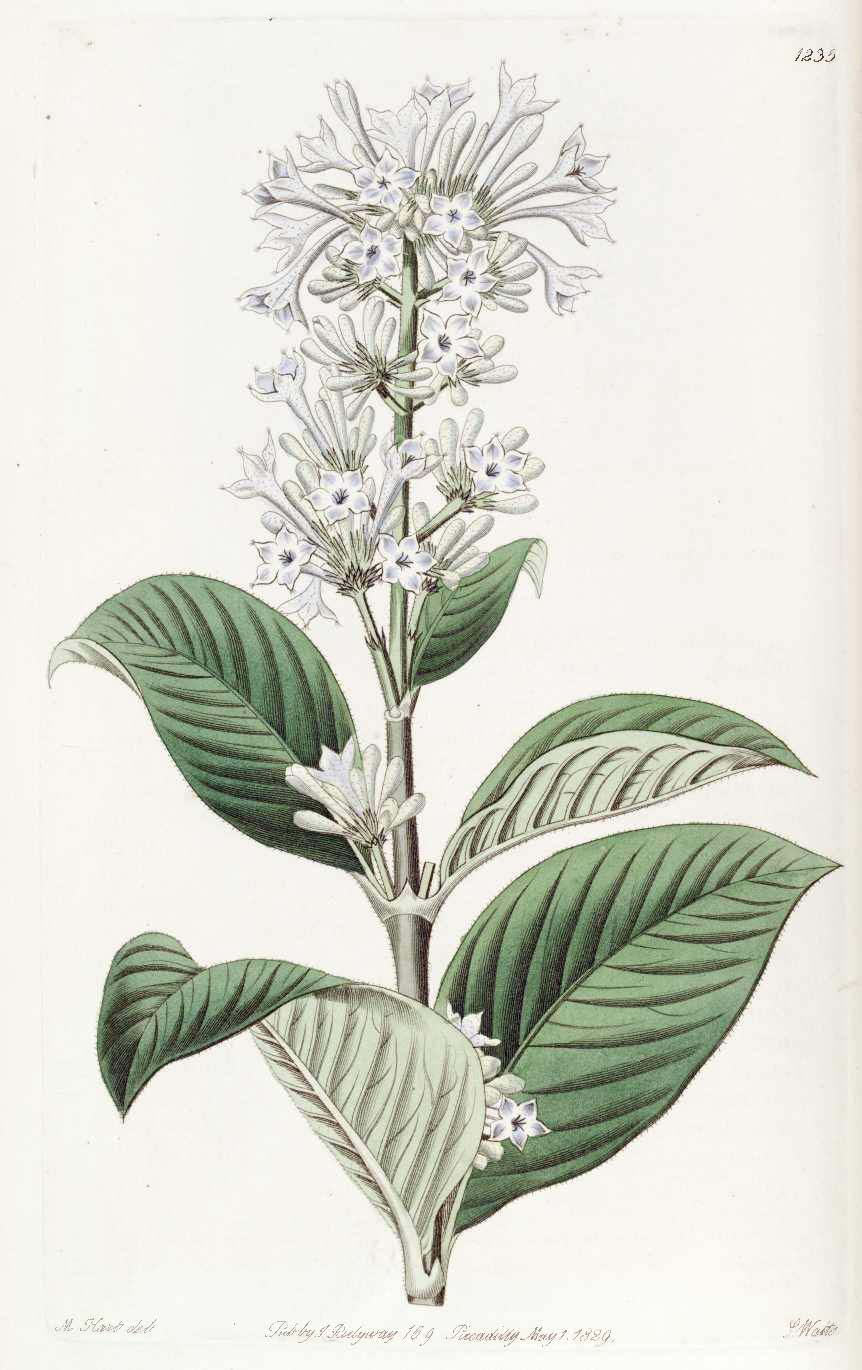
- Spermadictyon suaveolens

Scientific classification
- Kingdom: Plantae
- Clade: Tracheophytes
- Clade: Angiosperms
- Clade: Eudicots
- Clade: Asterids
- Order: Gentianales
- Family: Rubiaceae
- Genus: Spermadictyon; Roxb.

Synonyms
- Hamiltonia Roxb.

= Spermadictyon =

Genus of flowering plants

Spermadictyon is a genus of flowering plants belonging to the family Rubiaceae.

Its native range is Indian subcontinent.

== Species ==
Species:

- Spermadictyon suaveolens Roxb.
